= Happy Birthday! =

Studio album by Modeselektor
- Released: 10 September 2007
- Genre: IDM
- Length: 69:40
- Label: BPitch Control
- Producer: Gernot Bronsert; Sebastian Szary; Sascha Ring; Moritz Friedrich

Modeselektor chronology
Hello Mom! (2005)	Happy Birthday! (2007)	Monkeytown (2011)

Happy Birthday! is the second studio album by German electronic music duo Modeselektor. It was released on BPitch Control on 10 September 2007.

== Critical reception ==
Professional ratings
Review scores
Source	Rating
AllMusic	4/5 stars
Pitchfork	7.4/10
Tiny Mix Tapes	3.5/5 stars

Mark Pytlik of Pitchfork gave the album a 7.4 out of 10, saying, "what's interesting about Happy Birthday! isn't just that it fuses together the most unfashionable or discarded elements of electronic music's recent history, but that it manages to sound so fresh in doing so." A review for Tiny Mix Tapes awarded the album 3.5 out of 5, praising Modeselektor's eclectic approach while emphasizing the duo's ability to fuse disparate influences into a coherent album flow.

== Track listing ==
No.	Title	Length
1.	"Happy Birthday"	4:03
2.	"Godspeed"	5:46
3.	"2000007" (featuring TTC)	4:11
4.	"Let Your Love Grow" (featuring Apparat and Paul St. Hilaire)	5:25
5.	"Em Ocean"	1:54
6.	"Sucker Pin"	6:10
7.	"Edgar"	3:53
8.	"Hyper Hyper" (featuring Otto Von Schirach)	5:17
9.	"BMI"	4:29
10.	"The Dark Side of the Frog"	0:52
11.	"The Dark Side of the Sun" (featuring Puppetmastaz)	3:34
12.	"Déboutonnet" (featuring Siriusmo)	4:23
13.	"The Black Block"	5:41
14.	"The First Rebirth"	4:39
15.	"The White Flash" (featuring Thom Yorke)	4:49
16.	"Late Check-Out"	0:38
17.	"The Wedding Toccata Theme"	3:53
18.	"(I Can't Sleep) Without Music" (featuring Maxïmo Park)	3:32
Total length:		73:28

iTunes edition bonus track
No.	Title	Length
19.	"Get Wasted in Silence"	2:58
Total length:		76:26

== Charts ==
Chart	Peak position
French Albums (SNEP)	104
