= Sound Pellegrino =

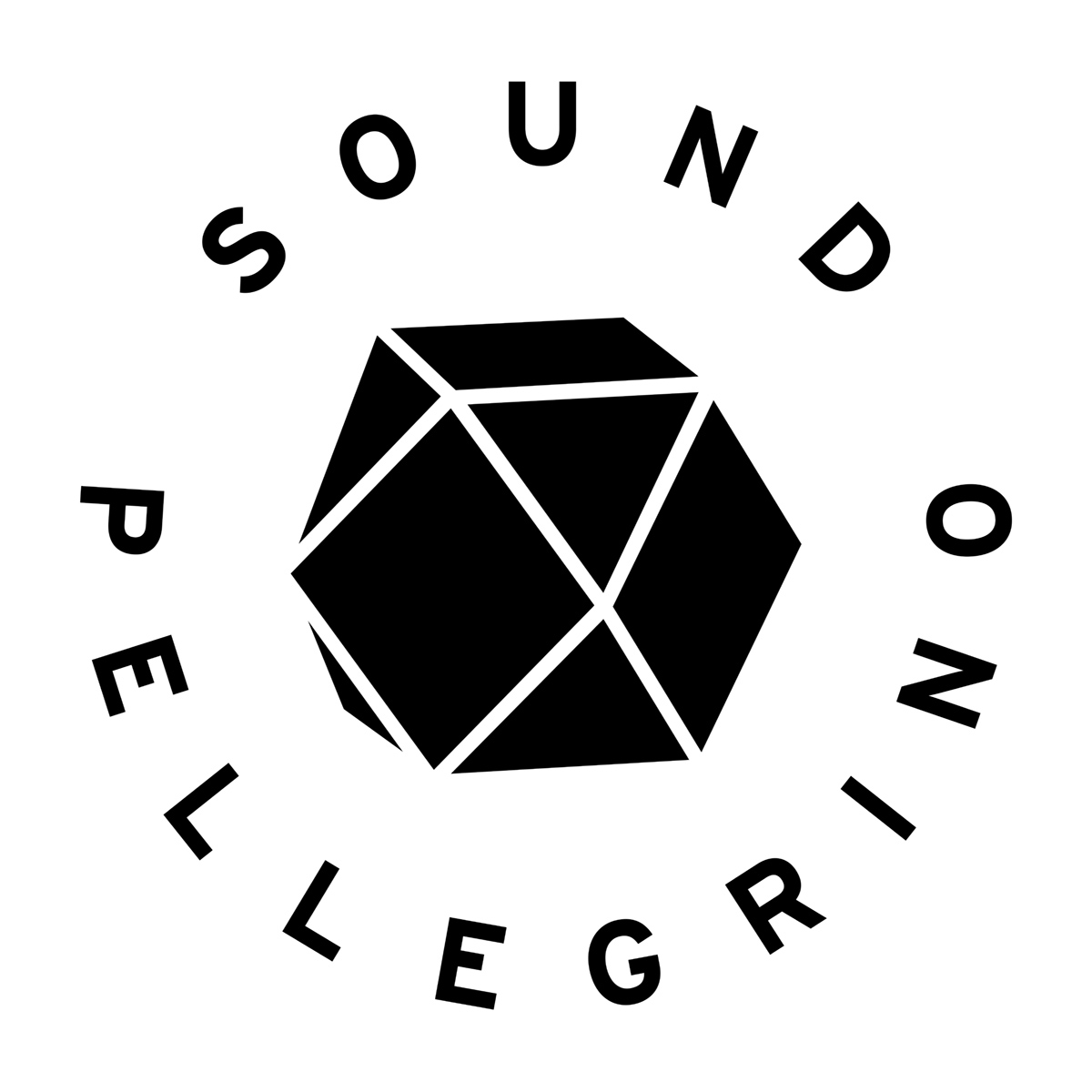
- Founded: 2009
- Genre: Techno; House; Electronica
- Country of origin: France
- Location: Paris
- Official website: https://soundpellegrino.bandcamp.com/

Sound Pellegrino is a Parisian independent record company founded in March 2009 by Teki Latex and Orgasmic (formerly from alt-rap group TTC), originally as a sub-label of Institubes.

After 15 releases under the Institubes umbrella, it became fully independent in December 2010 for the release of Panteros666's "Kegstand / X Lova / Horreo" EP.

Sound Pellegrino is currently run by Teki Latex, Orgasmic and Emile Shahidi.

== Discography ==
=== Singles and EP's ===
- Zombie Disco Squad - "Esperanto / Eurovision" (March 2009)
- Douster - "For Weirdos Only / Freak Mode" (April 2009)
- Harvard Bass - "Caked / 81" (June 2009)
- Renaissance Man - "What Is Guru / Aloha" (July 2009)
- Momma's Boy - "Wedouwedou / Give It Up" (August 2009)
- Gucci Vump - "Sha! Still! / The Boogieman / Casablanco" (September 2009)
- L-Vis 1990 - "Compass / Zahonda" (October 2009)
- Solo (UK) - "Minimood / Rawmania" (November 2009)
- Nouveau Yorican - "Boriqua" (December 2009)
- Bart B More - "Romane" (February 2010)
- Teki Latex - "Answers / Dinosaurs With Guns / I Was Sober" (April 2010)
- Para One - "Kiwi / Toadstool" (June 2010)
- Teki Latex - "Dinosaurs With Guns Remixes" (October 2010)
- Panteros666 - "Kegstand / X Lova / Horreo" (December 2010)
- Savage Skulls - "Caravan / Watching You" (February 2011)
- High Powered Boys - "Udon / Work" (March 2011)
- Style Of Eye - "Wet / Dry" (May 2011)
- Sound Pellegrino Thermal Team - "Bassface / Pretty Pretty Good" (July 2011)
- Sound Pellegrino Thermal Team - "Bassface Remixes" (August 2011)
- TWR72 - "Paradox" EP (August 2011)
- Noob - "Spell" EP (October 2011)
- Bok Bok & Tom Trago - "Night Voyage Tool Kit" (October 2011)
- Matthias Zimmermann - "Isla Dub" EP (November 2011)
- Joakim & Bambounou "Fructose" EP (December 2011)
- Maelstrom - "USSR" EP (February 2012)
- Sound Pellegrino Thermal Team - "Strange Touch (My House) / Ice Palace" (April 2012)
- Aero Manyelo - "Home" EP (May 2012)
- Teeth - "Meme Is The New Riddim" (June 2012)
- Matthias Zimmermann - "Bastian" (July 2012)
- Surkin & Todd Edwards - "I Want You Back" (August 2012)
- Sound Pellegrino Thermal Team - "Activate / I Be" (October 2012)
- Matthias Zimmermann - "Botanica Dub" EP (November 2012)
- Crystal - "Get It" EP (June 2013)
- Eero Johannes - "Real Virtuality" EP (October 2013)
- Joe Howe - "EXEP" (April 2014)
- Track ID - "Session 1" (May 2014)
- Matthias Zimmermann - "Momentum Series, pt I" (September 2014)
- Koyote - "Let Me Tell You What I've Got" (December 2014)
- Doline - "Elusive" (April 2015)
- Matthias Zimmermann - "Momentum Series, pt II" (November 2015)
- Matthias Zimmermann - "Andeo" (April 2016)
- Matthias Zimmermann - "Martin" (May 2016)
- Loom - "Burnt Glass" EP (June 2016)
- Matthias Zimmermann - "Lia" EP (March 2017)

=== Compilations ===
- "One To Ten" (April 2010)
- "Straight From The Spring" (August 2010)
- "Les Jeunes Années (若かりし日々)" (March 2011)
- "SND.PE vol.01" (June 2013)
- "SND.PE vol.02 : Crossover Series" (January 2014)
- "SND.PE vol.03 : Raw Club Material" (June 2014)
- "Sound Pellegrino x Wasabeat" (August 2014)
- "SND.PE vol.04: Melodic Mechanisms" (January 2015)
- "SND.PE vol.05: Mixed by Teki Latex & Orgasmic" (January 2016)

=== Albums ===
- Matthias Zimmermann - "S/T" (June 2016)

=== Expect No Less ===
Vinyl-only sub-label curated by Orgasmic.

- (Unknown Artist) - "XPNL001" (April 2013)
- Deke Soto - "XPNL002" (April 2014)

== Sound Pellegrino Thermal Team ==
Sound Pellegrino Thermal Team is the duo formed by Teki Latex and Orgasmic. The pair deejays and produces under this moniker since the inception of the label. Their debut EP "Bassface" was released in July 2011.

== The Sound Pellegrino Podcast ==
The Sound Pellegrino Podcast was the label's weekly show from 2011 to 2014, premiering music from the label's and a wide spectrum of club and electronica artists. After a 5-year break, episode 103 of the podcast was released in 2019.
