= Paul Affeld =

Paul Affeld (born 1972 in Berlin) is a German artist, musician, author, puppet maker, puppeteer, theatre director, and lecturer in puppetry and puppet construction. He is also the founder and official Band Leader of the Berlin band Puppetmastaz, with which he has toured internationally since 1998 and for which he designs and builds the hand puppets. Affeld himself performs at concerts as the bandleader Mister Maloke, a mole wearing a large top hat. He has also appeared under the names Paul PM, Paul Affeldo, and Paul F. Walther.

== Life ==
Paul Affeld was born in 1972, as was his brother Felix, the son of Petra Affeld, née Niemeyer, and the engineer and developer of an artificial heart, Klaus Affeld (1935–2019). After first studying photography and computer animation at the Bildo Academy for Art and Media, Affeld focused on camera work and video editing at the Konrad Wolf Film University of Babelsberg between 1993 and 1995. From 1995 onward, he was a member of the artist collective Honey Suckle Company and exhibited, among other places, at the Berlin Biennale.

In 1997, he switched to studying puppetry at the Ernst Busch Academy of Dramatic Arts, and in 1998 he founded the puppet band Puppetmastaz. Since the band's founding, he has produced eight studio albums, six music videos, and 32 hand puppets, as well as several solo projects with bands and artists such as Modeselektor, T.Raumschmiere, Chilly Gonzales, Mouse on Mars, and others.

In addition to numerous radio and television appearances in Germany, including on Arte in the programmes Tracks and Arte Lounge, and in France, he toured in more than 250 concerts across over 20 countries, including throughout Europe as well as Japan, Canada, the United States, China, Brazil, Russia, and Africa. After a stage accident in 2012, he decided to step back somewhat from touring to devote more attention to theatre work.

He has taught puppet-making and performance courses at the Academy of Arts, Berlin, the Haus der Kulturen der Welt, and במסגרת various events of the Goethe-Institut, including in Bangalore, India, where he also appeared at the local literature festival and where the documentary Potatoes Grow in Darkness was made.

His plays Frankensteins Rotkäppchen and Das Kristallherz were staged, among other venues, at the Volksbühne Berlin and the Theater an der Parkaue in Berlin.

Since 2021, Paul Affeld has been working on his first solo album and, following the birth of his son in 2018, on a children's puppet theatre piece titled Micky Mickrig und die großen Wünsche. Paul Affeld lives and works in Berlin.

== Discography (selected) ==
=== Studio albums ===
- 2003: Puppetmastaz: Creature Funk
- 2005: Puppetmastaz: Creature Shock Radio
- 2008: Puppetmastaz: The Takeover
- 2009: Puppetmastaz: The Break-Up
- 2012: Puppetmastaz: Revolve and Step Up!
- 2016: Puppetmastaz: Keep Yo Animal!
- 2019: Puppetmastaz: Sweet Sugar Rush
- 2023: Puppetmastaz: Welcome To The Zoo.

=== Vinyl singles and EPs ===
- 2000: Patric Catani and Paul PM: Discovering Steve Hive
- 2002: Puppetmastaz: Humans get all the Credits (vinyl single)
- 2003: Puppetmastaz: Pet Sound (audio CD / vinyl single)
- 2003: Puppetmastaz: Zoology (audio CD / vinyl single)
- 2004: Puppetmastaz: Prosetti's Disco Balls (vinyl LP) (remix version of Creature Funk)
- 2007: Puppetmastaz: The dark side of the sun (feat. Modeselektor) (vinyl single)
- 2008: Puppetmastaz: Mephistopheles (remix vinyl single)
- 2008: Puppetmastaz: Reservoir Foxin / So Scandalous (remix vinyl single)

=== Audio CD singles ===
- 2005: Puppetmastaz: Bigger the better
- 2006: Puppetmastaz: Do the swamp

=== Live albums ===
- 2006: Puppetmastaz: Clones live in Berlin (audio CD / vinyl LP)

=== Featuring and presenting (as vocalist) ===
- 1999: Fever: Too Bad But True
- 1999: Various: Dash 'Em auf Collision Course
- 2000: Patric Catani & Paul PM: Discovering Steve Hive EP
- 2000/2001: Chilly Gonzales feat. Paul PM: Meditation und Figga Please auf The Entertainist
- 2002: Sneaker Pimps: Sick (Gonzales "Games" Remix)
- 2002: Chilly Gonzales feat. Paul PM & Peaches: Insanity
- 2003: Chilly Gonzales feat. Paul PM: (Another) So-Called Party; Beiträge auf Z
- 2003: Candie Hank feat. Paul PM: All the Sunshine Was Wrong
- 2003: Lost Treasures: Number One
- 2004: Le Peuple de l'Herbe feat. Puppetmastaz: El Paso; Beiträge auf Cube
- 2004: Trost: The Invasion of Gaudy Beige
- 2005: Bus feat. MC Soom-T: Twistin' (Bus in the Mix) auf Feelin' Dank
- 2007: Modeselektor feat. Paul PM: Happy Birthday auf The Dark Side of the Moon; Modeselektor feat. Puppetmastaz: The Dark Side Of The Sun
- 2008: T.Raumschmiere: Animal Territory
- 2008: Le Peuple de l'Herbe: El Paso auf Live
- 2012: Schlachthofbronx feat. Paul PM: Dirty Dancing auf One Hand
- 2014: Mouse on Mars feat. Mr. Maloke: Purple Fog auf 21 Again
- 2015: Frag Maddin feat. Paul PM: Back Up auf Forward
