= Apparat (musician) =

German musician (born 1978)

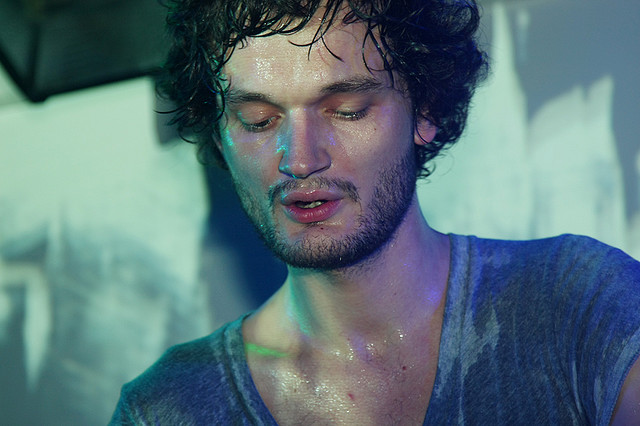
- Apparat performing in 2009

Background information
- Born: Sascha Ring; 27 June 1978 (age 48); Quedlinburg, East Germany
- Genres: Electronic; ambient; IDM; progressive house; avant-pop; synth-pop; techno
- Occupation: Musician
- Instruments: Synthesizer, keyboards, guitar, drums, personal computer, vocals
- Years active: 1996–present
- Labels: Shitkatapult, BPitch Control, P-Vine Records, Mute Records, inFiné
- Member of: Moderat
- Website: apparat.net

Sascha Ring (born 27 June 1978), better known by the stage name Apparat, is a German electronic musician. He was previously co-owner of Shitkatapult records. Starting out with dancefloor-oriented techno, he shifted focus towards ambient music, becoming "more interested in designing sounds than beats".

He collaborates with Modeselektor under the name Moderat.

== Career ==
Sascha Ring was born in Quedlinburg. He moved to Berlin in 1997 to "live a more regular life".

Around 2000, he began to help run a record label Shitkatapult with its founder Marco Haas. A year later, he released his first debut full-length Multifunktionsebene alongside with limited EP Algorhythm.

Ring collaborated with Ellen Allien in 2003 on the album Berlinette and again in 2006 on the album Orchestra of Bubbles.

In 2004, he recorded a John Peel session. The tracks from this session were rerecorded and reworked in the studio and released as Silizium EP in 2005, as a tribute to Peel.

In 2007, he formed his own band to play the album Walls live. Raz Ohara joined him playing the stage piano and Jörg Waehner on drums. Next to playing these live shows, he continued to play his solo live sets, touring with Transforma Visuals.

In May 2009, he released the self-titled album with Modeselektor under the name Moderat on BPitch Control. They had previously collaborated on the EP Auf Kosten Der Gesundheit which was released as a limited 12" in 2002.

In April 2009, he won in the Dance Floor category of the Qwartz Electronic Music Awards with the track "Fractales (Apparat Ibiza Version)".

In 2011, he signed with Mute Records, through which he released his new record The Devil's Walk, named after a political poem by romantic English poet Percy Bysshe Shelley, in September.

Apparat's music has been used in film and television. His track "Holdon" was used in the trailer for the 2010 Teton Gravity Research ski film Light The Wick.

"Goodbye" featuring Soap&Skin was used in a climactic scene in the Season 4 finale of Breaking Bad, the intro for the 2017 Netflix series Dark, the episode "Broken Home" in Nikita, the 2014 Tatort episode "Kaltstart," and in the 2014 Italian biopic Leopardi. It also appeared in the French trailer of Rust and Bone, the trailer of Prisoners (2013), a 2014 theatrical trailer for The Drop, the first released trailer for Taken 3 and the official series 1-3 recap of BBC One show Luther, and was occasionally used by Bonobo as an opening for his live shows.

"Black Water" was used in episode 2 in series 6 of Skins and in the trailer for the 2012 Candide Thovex ski film A Few Words. "Ash/Black Veil" was used in the 2011 snowboard documentary The Art of Flight. Tracks from Krieg und Frieden (Music for Theatre) and The Devil's Walk were used with end title credits to Sasha Ring in the Italian movie Leopardi (Il giovane favoloso) (2014) by Mario Martone.

The Moderat song "The Mark (Interlude)" from the album II was featured in the 2018 film Annihilation.

On 7 September 2013, Ring was injured in a motorcycle accident in Berlin, suffering a multiple leg fracture and postponing his tour with Moderat.

On 22 January 2019, Mute Records announced Apparat's fifth album, LP5, to be released on 22 March 2019, as well as releasing the records' tracklist and its first single "DAWAN" with corresponding music video.

The album LP5 was nominated for Best Dance/Electronic Album in the 2020 Grammy Awards. It also has been nominated for IMPALA's European Independent Album of the Year Award (2019). Apparat won IMPALA's European Independent Album of the Year Award 2019.

During pandemic in 2020, he reissued several soundtracks he composed few years ago. Capri-Revolution, Stay Still, Dämonen, and Equals Session were reissued digitally before compiled as the vinyl box Soundtracks a year later.

In 2026, he released his sixth album A Hum of Maybe on Mute. It was co-produced and co-written by Philipp Johann Thimm.

== Discography ==
=== Studio albums as Apparat ===
- Multifunktionsebene (Shitkatapult, 2001)
- Duplex (Shitkatapult, 2003)
- Walls (Shitkatapult, 2007)
- The Devil's Walk (Mute, 2011)
- Krieg und Frieden (Music for Theatre) (Mute, 2013)
- LP5 (Mute, 2019)
- Soundtracks: Capri-Revolution (It's Complicated Records, 2020)
- Soundtracks: Stay Still (It's Complicated Records, 2020)
- Soundtracks: Dämonen (It's Complicated Records, 2020)
- Soundtracks: Equals Sessions (It's Complicated Records, 2020)
- A Hum of Maybe (Mute, 2026)

=== Other albums as Apparat ===
- Things to Be Frickled (Shitkatapult, 2008) – 2 CD compilation, 1 CD of Apparat remixes of others' music, 1 CD of others remixing Apparat's music
- DJ-Kicks: Apparat (Studio !K7, 2010)
- Multifunktionsebene, Tttrial and Eror, Duplex (Shitkatapult, 2015)
- Soundtracks (Mute, 2021)

=== Collaborations ===
- Orchestra of Bubbles (BPitch Control, 2006) with Ellen Allien

=== Albums with Modeselektor as Moderat ===
- Moderat (BPitch Control, 2009)
- II (Monkeytown Records, 2013)
- III (Monkeytown Records, 2016)
- More D4ta (Monkeytown Records, 2022)

=== Singles and EPs ===
- Algorythm (Jetlag, 2001)
- Tttrial and Eror (Shitkatapult, 2002)
- Auf Kosten Der Gesundheit (BPitch Control, 2003) with Modeselektor (as Moderat)
- Koax (BPitch Control, 2003)
- Can't Computerize It (BPitch Control, 2004)
- Duplex.Remixes (Shitkatapult, 2004)
- Shapemodes (Neo Ouija, 2004)
- Silizium (Shitkatapult, 2005)
- Berlin, Montreal, Tel Aviv (Shitkatapult, 2006)
- Turbo Dreams (BPitch Control, 2006)
- Way Out Remixes (BPitch Control, 2006)
- Jet Remixes (BPitch Control, 2006)
- Holdon (Shitkatapult, 2007)
- Arcadia Rmxs (InFiné, 2008)
- Sayulita (DJ-Kicks) (!K7, 2010)
- "Ash/Black Veil" (Mute, 2011)
- "Black Water" (Mute, 2011) UK:#68
- "Song of Los" (Mute, 2011)
- "Candil de la Calle" (Mute, 2012)
- "Dawan" (2019)
