= Hello Mom! =

Studio album by Modeselektor
- Released: 11 October 2005
- Genre: IDM
- Length: 60:08
- Label: BPitch Control
- Producer: Gernot Bronsert; Sebastian Szary; Matt Shadetek

Modeselektor chronology
| Hello Mom! (2005) | Happy Birthday! (2007) |

Hello Mom! is the debut studio album by German electronic music duo Modeselektor. It was released on BPitch Control on 11 October 2005.

== Critical reception ==
Professional ratings
Review scores
| Source | Rating |
|---|---|
| AllMusic | 3.5/5 stars |
| Pitchfork | 8.3/10 |
| PopMatters | 6/10 |

Nitsuh Abebe of Pitchfork gave the album an 8.3 out of 10, saying, "There's hardly a minute on this record that doesn't keep turning out to be way more fun than the last time you heard it." Tim O'Neil of PopMatters gave the album a 6 out of 10, commenting that "Hello Mom! is, like the very best albums, gleefully diverse and yet strangely focused." He added, "There are as many different flavors of techno as you can imagine here, but it all comes from the same impulse, a puckish desire to leave no stone unturned in their indefatigable quest to destroy the very notion of a techno orthodoxy."

== Track listing ==
All tracks are written by Gernot Bronsert and Sebastian Szary, except where noted

| No. | Title | Writer(s) | Length |
|---|---|---|---|
| 1. | "Dancingbox" (featuring TTC) | | 3:59 |
| 2. | "Die Clubnummer" | | 4:33 |
| 3. | "Tetrispack" | | 4:16 |
| 4. | "The Rapanthem" | | 4:29 |
| 5. | "Kill Bill Vol. 4" | | 5:13 |
| 6. | "Ziq Zaq" | | 5:27 |
| 7. | "Vote or Die" | | 5:14 |
| 8. | "Earth (UPS Edit)" | | 3:50 |
| 9. | "Fake Emotion" (featuring Paul St. Hilaire) | Bronsert; Paul St. Hilaire; Szary | 3:23 |
| 10. | "In Loving Memory" | | 5:49 |
| 11. | "Hasir" | | 4:51 |
| 12. | "Silikon" (featuring Sasha Perera) | Bronsert; Sasha Perera; Szary | 3:47 |
| 13. | "I Love You" | | 5:17 |
| Total length: | | | 60:08 |

iTunes edition bonus track
| No. | Title | Length |
|---|---|---|
| 14. | "My Anthem" | 5:04 |
| Total length: | | 65:12 |

== Personnel ==
Credits adapted from liner notes.

- Gernot Bronsert – production
- Sebastian Szary – production
- Cuizinier – vocals (1)
- Tido Berman – vocals (1)
- Teki Latex – vocals (1)
- DJ Orgasmic – turntables (1)
- Paul St. Hilaire – vocals (9)
- Matt Shadetek – additional production (11, 12)
- Sasha Perera – vocals (12)
