= Mixing Me =

EP by Miss Kittin
- Released: 19 April 2005
- Recorded: 2004
- Genre: Electronica, electropop, electroclash, dance, techno
- Label: EMI Music Brazil (Brazil); Labels (France); Astralwerks (U.S.)
- Producer: Miss Kittin

Miss Kittin chronology
I Com (2004)	Mixing Me (2005)	Live at Sónar (2006)

Mixing Me is a 2005 EP by Miss Kittin to promote her album I Com. Mixing Me contains remixes of I Com's singles.

== Critical reception ==
Professional ratings
Review scores
Source	Rating
Allmusic	4/5 stars
PopMatters	6/10 stars

Johnny Loftus of Allmusic said, "Mixing Me is a fantastic Miss Kittin entry point. She splices parts of later tracks into the earlier ones for more adventure."

== Track listing ==
No.	Title	Length
1.	"Professional Distortion (Kittin + Zdar Aka-Pella)"	2;33
2.	"Requiem for a Hit (Abe Duque Remix)"	3:16
3.	"Soundtrack of Now (Original)"	3:36
4.	"Happy Violentine (Michael Mayer Remix)"	5:34
5.	"Requiem for a Hit (Ge-Gm Remix)"	3:30
6.	"Professional Distortion (Modeselektor Remix)"	4:49
7.	"Happy Violentine (LFO Mix)"	5:20
8.	"Allergic (Original)"	5:03
