= Robot Koch =

German record producer (born 1977)

Robert Koch
- Also known as: Robot Koch; Robots Don't Sleep; The Tape
- Born: Robert Koch; 7 October 1977 (age 48); Kassel, Germany
- Genres: Electronic
- Instruments: Piano; drums; synthesizer
- Years active: 2000–present
- Labels: Project Mooncircle; BPitch Control; Four Music; Monkeytown
- Formerly of: Jahcoozi
- Website: robotsdontsleep.com

Robert Koch (born 7 October 1977), best known by the stage name Robot Koch, is a German, Los Angeles–based artist, composer, and record producer. Koch made a name for himself as a member of the band Jahcoozi before launching as a solo artist. His electronic music sound has been called "Wonderful and Strange – pop music from the future" by John Peel of the BBC, in 2003.

== Background ==
Koch was introduced to the piano at six years of age, and later to the drums at thirteen. He has said that both instruments were helpful in his later years as a composer, giving him a foundation in a harmonic and a rhythmic understanding of music. He worked as a composer and producer in Berlin up until 2013, when he relocated to Los Angeles, California.

While Koch has been releasing his own original material on the labels Monkeytown Records, Project Mooncircle, Bpitch Control, and Four Music, he has been a successful producer, remixer, and collaborator for other musicians such as Tensnake, Norah Jones, Bassnectar, and Max Richter. He has worked as a producer and composer for both indie and major artists worldwide, and has won gold and platinum records for his production work for Marteria, Casper, and K.I.Z. In 2014, he won the German Music Composers Award in the category "Best Electronic Music Composer".

Koch's music has been used in numerous television shows and films, including NBC's The Blacklist, ABC's How to Get Away with Murder, MTV's Teen Wolf, and the trailer for San Andreas.

== Projects ==
In 2016, Koch launched his own label, Trees and Cyborgs.

In 2018, he co-created the immersive audio-visual project "Sphere" in collaboration with visual artist Mickael Le Goff. For the project, Koch's 2018 album Sphere was transformed into film and a visual exploration of space, and exhibited in full-dome venues and planetariums around the world. The full-dome show was designed to transport the audience through space and time using custom projection visuals and atmospheric music, presented in a 3D sound environment.

As part of his work, Koch has also explored modern classical compositions. For the ninth edition of Neue Meister at DRIVE Forum Berlin, the artist, together with Australian violinist and composer Savannah Jo Lack, wrote and performed six pieces that were exclusively composed for the Neue Meister series. The music for this series was released in 2019.

== Discography ==
=== Solo ===
Studio albums

- Death Star Droid (2009)
- Songs for Trees and Cyborgs (2010)
- The Other Side (2011)
- Unpaved (2013)
- Tsuki (2015)
- Hypermoment (2015)
- Sphere (2018)
- The Next Billion Years (2020)
- Full Circle (2021)
- Foam and Sand (2023)
- Ocean Consciousness (2023)
- Allow (2024)

EPs

- Lies (feat. Elle P) (2008)
- Listen to Them Fade (2010)
- Cosmic Waves (2012)

Remixes and compilations

- Death Star Droid Remixes (2010)
- Sphere (Out Takes & Remixes) (2019)
- Shades of Guilt (2019)
- Full Circle Reworks (2021)
- The Next Billion Years (Foam and Sand Reworks) (2022)
- Reworks (Foam and Sand and Robot Koch) (2024)

=== Jahcoozi ===
Studio albums

- Pure Breed Mongrel (2005)
- Blitz 'N' Ass (2007)
- Barefoot Wanderer (2010)

EPs

- Fish 12" (2003)
- V.A.: Girls (2004)
- Rebel Futurism Part 2 (2004)
- Black Barbie (2005)
- Black Barbie/Stereotyp Rmx (2006)
- Reworks (2007)
- Double Barrel Name (2007)
- BLN (2007)
- Namedropper (2009)
- Barbed Wire (2009)
- Watching You (2009)
- Barefoot Wanderer Remixes PT 1 (2010)
- Barefoot Wanderer Remixes PT 2 (2010)

=== The Tape vs RQM ===
- Hungry Man EP (2005)
- Autoreverse (2005)
- Public Transport (2007)
- Luvley 12" (2008)

=== Robot Koch vs Cerebral Vortex ===
- Vortex Cookies (2008)
- Upside Down EP (2009)
- Aftershocks EP (2009)

=== Fiora & Robot Koch ===
- "Dreams of You" single (2011)
- "Let It Go By" single (2017)

=== Robots Don't Sleep ===
- Robots Don't Sleep EP (2012)
- Mirror (2013)

=== Robot Koch and Savannah Jo Lack ===
- Particle Fields (2016)
- Particle Fields Reimagined (2017)
- Otherwhere (2019)

=== Delhia de France & Robot Koch ===
- "California Dreamin" single (2015)
- Moirai EP (2018)

=== Other projects ===
- Goodman & Clean – Lights EP (2000)
- Back 2 Square 1 – The State of the World (2002)
- Autodrive – 4 Girls EP (2005)
- The Tape – Perpetual Dubbing (2005)
- MMDC – Love Your Sister (2006)
- Autodrive – Exponential (2006)
- Autodrive vs. Jahcoozi – Hiding from the Truth (2008)
- Robot Koch and John Robinson – Robot Robinson (2011)
- Robot Koch x Susie Suh – Here with Me (2014)
- May & Robot Koch – Gold EP (2018)
- Robot Koch & Schwarzmodul – "Black Water" single (2019)
- Robot Koch & Ian Urbina – Albatross EP (2020)
- Robot Koch – Wir Kinder vom Bahnhof Zoo soundtrack (2021)

=== Remixes, production, and features ===
- Panorama – "Super Race Monkey [Jahcoozi Remix]" (2003)
- Mendelson – "White Canary [Jahcoozi Remix]" (2004)
- Inverse Cinematics [The Tape Remix]" (2005)
- Tolcha feat. Jahcoozi – "Crushed Like Ice" (2005)
- Raz Ohara – "Hymn [Jahcoozi Remix]" (2005)
- Justine Electra – "Killalady [The Tape Remix]" (2006)
- Modeselektor feat. Sasha Perera – "Silikon" (2006)
- Data MC – "Pioneer Camp [The Tape Remix]" (2006)
- Unknownmix – "The Siren [Jahcoozi Remix]" (2006)
- Tolcha vs. Soom T – "Send Dem Kids to War [Jahcoozi Remix]" (2007)
- Filewile – "Damn [Jahcoozi Remix]" (2007)
- Missill feat. Jahcoozi – "Glitch EP" (2008)
- Mochipet feat. Jahcoozi – "Microphonepet" (2008)
- Jennifer Rostock – "Ich Will Hier Raus [Robot Koch Remix]" (2008)
- Jennifer Rostock – "Kopf oder Zahl [Robot Koch Remix]" (2008)
- Jennifer Rostock – "Feuer [Robot Koch Remix]" (2008)
- Envy – "Tongue Twister [Robot Koch Remix]" (2008)
- Marsimoto – "Zu Zweit Allein" (2008)
- Mochipet – "Rambunction Rmx" (2008)
- Sneaky – "Feel Like a King feat. Barbara Panther [Robot Koch Remix]" (2009)
- King Cannibal & Jahcoozi – "Murder Us" (2009)
- Mexicans with Guns – "Nuts and Bongos" (2009)
- Th Mole – "How 2 Be Cool" (2009)
- Ira Atari – "My Name Is Ira" (2009)
- KU BO – "Kaggua" (2009)
- Marteria – "Zum Glück in die Zukunft" (2010)
- Max Mutzke – "Home Work Soul" (2010)
- The Drapers – "We No Speak Americano" (2010)
- Bassnectar – "Teleport Massive" (2010)
- Talen – "The Comic Book EP" (2010)
- Casper – "XOXO" (2011)
- Kraddy – "Let Go" (2011)
- K.I.Z. – "Urlaub fürs Gehirn" (2011)
- Graciela Maria – "Many Places" (2011)
- Max Herre – "fühlt sich wie fliegen an (remix)" (2012)
- Marsimoto – "Grüner Samt" (2012)
- Justine Electra – "Great Skate Date" (2013)
- Julien Mier – "Porcelain Dust" (2013)
- Claire – "The Next Ones to Come" (2013)
- Ok Kid – "Ok Kid" (2013)
- Long Distance Calling – "The Flood Inside" (2013)
- Elenka – "Wolf" (2013)
- Hurts – "Miracle" (2013)
- Alek Fin – "Waiting Like a Wolf Remix" (2013)
- Orsons – "Lagerhalle (remix)" (2013)
- Andrea Balency Crystals" (2014)
- Markus Wiebusch – "Konfetti" (2014)
- Anoushka Shankar & Norah Jones – "The Sun Won't Set" (2014)
- Tensnake – "Holla" (2014)
- Vivaldi – "Summer" (2014)
- Rebeka – "Breath" (2015)
- Kasar – "Gone" (2015)
- Numaads – "Now" (2015)
- Adiam – "Runaway" (2015)
- Alejandro Bento – "Rain" (2016)
- Equador – "Blood" (2016)
- Dapayk & Padberg – "Sink the Ship" (2016)
- Hundreds – "Spotless" (2016)
- Schwarz – "In Your Eyes" (2017)
- Joplyn – "Too Close" (2017)
- Christian Löffler – "Mare" (2017)
- Anomie Belle – "Flux" (2018)
- Jono McCleery & Sterling Grove – "Beneath" (2018)
- 2Raumwohnung – "Ich hör Musik wenn ich dich seh" (2018)
- John Metcalfe – "When They Weep" (2019)
- Alex Banks – "Chasms" (2020)
- Aparde – "No Need" (2020)

== Awards ==
Deutscher Musikautorenpreis – Best Electronic Music Composer (2014)
