= Monkeytown (album) =

Studio album by Modeselektor
- Released: 30 September 2011
- Genre: IDM
- Length: 55:46
- Label: Monkeytown
- Producer: Gernot Bronsert; Sebastian Szary

Modeselektor chronology
Modeselektion Vol. 01 (2010)	Monkeytown (2011)	Who Else (2019)

Singles from Monkeytown
- 1. "Shipwreck" Released: 2011; 2. "This" Released: 2012; 3. "Evil Twin / German Clap" Released: 2012

Monkeytown is the third studio album by German electronic music duo Modeselektor. It was released on Monkeytown Records on 30 September 2011. It was produced "100% together in the studio and in one session over the course of ten weeks". In 2014, it was awarded a double silver certification from the Independent Music Companies Association, which indicated sales of at least 40,000 copies throughout Europe.

== Critical reception ==
Professional ratings
Aggregate scores
Source	Rating
Metacritic	67/100
Review scores
Source	Rating
AllMusic	3.5/5 stars
The Guardian	3/5 stars
Pitchfork	7.4/10
Resident Advisor	4.5/5 stars
Rolling Stone	3/5 stars

At Metacritic, which assigns a normalized rating out of 100 to reviews from mainstream critics, the album received an average score of 67, based on 16 reviews, indicating "generally favorable reviews".

== Track listing ==
All tracks are written by Gernot Bronsert and Sebastian Szary, except where noted.

No.	Title	Writer(s)	Length
1.	"Blue Clouds"		6:02
2.	"Pretentious Friends" (featuring Busdriver)		3:33
3.	"Shipwreck" (featuring Thom Yorke)	Bronsert; Szary; Thom Yorke	6:14
4.	"Evil Twin" (featuring Otto von Schirach)		4:01
5.	"German Clap"		6:34
6.	"Berlin" (featuring Miss Platnum)		4:44
7.	"Grillwalker"		4:03
8.	"Green Light Go" (featuring PVT)	Bronsert; PVT; Szary	4:50
9.	"Humanized" (featuring Anti Pop Consortium)		4:23
10.	"This" (featuring Thom Yorke)	Bronsert; Szary; Yorke	6:26
11.	"War Cry"		4:56
Total length:			55:46

== Personnel ==
Credits adapted from liner notes.

- Gernot Bronsert – production
- Sebastian Szary – production
- Busdriver – vocals (2)
- Pillow Talk – emergency call (2)
- Thom Yorke – vocals (3, 10)
- Otto von Schirach – vocals (4)
- Miss Platnum – vocals (6)
- PVT – guest appearance (8)
- Siriusmo – synthesizer (8)
- Gordon Boerger – drums (8)
- Anti Pop Consortium – vocals (9)
- Sascha Ring – guitar (11)

== Charts ==
Chart	Peak position
French Albums (SNEP)	170
Belgian Albums (Ultratop Wallonia)	97
