= Tttrial and Eror =

2002 mini-LP by Apparat

EP by Apparat
- Released: 18 February 2002
- Recorded: 2001
- Studio: Tracnet Studio, Berlin
- Genre: Abstract; IDM; glitch
- Length: 29:15
- Label: Shitkatapult

Professional ratings
Review scores
Source	Rating
Gullbuy	favorable
Menschenfeind	B+

Tttrial and Eror is a mini-LP by German electronic musician Apparat. It was released on 18 February 2002 on Shitkatapult label. Tttrial and Eror was recorded at Tracnet Studio, Berlin in 2001. In 2015, the mini-album was included in the reissue compilation of Sascha Ring's first three records, titled Multifunktionsebene, Tttrial and Eror, Duplex.

== Composition ==
Tttrial and Eror's music style has been characterized as dark, glitch-driven electronic music with complex broken rhythms, warped synthlines, melodic backdrops, and noisy, malfunction-inspired elements. Paul Simpson of AllMusic called it an "abrasive yet melodic" IDM release, characteristic of Ring's early work. The mini-album has been described as stylistically similar to Autechre, Phonem and Aphex Twin.

== Track listing ==
All tracks are written by Apparat.

No.	Title	Length
1.	"First Try"	1:08
2.	"First Eror"	5:14
3.	"Pressure"	7:20
4.	"Bugs And Fixes"	5:05
5.	"Nato"	4:07
6.	"ABS"	4:38
7.	"Shutdown"	1:43
Total length:		29:15

== Credits ==
Credits adapted from the liner notes of Tttrial and Eror.

- Saxophone: Hormel Eastwood (track 3)
- Mastered by Robert Henke
