= Professional Distortion =

Single by Miss Kittin

from the album I Com
- Released: 17 May 2004
- Genre: Breakcore, electroclash
- Label: NovaMute
- Songwriter(s): Caroline Hervé, Thies Mynther, Tobias Neumann
- Producer(s): Thies Mynther, Tobias Neumann

Miss Kittin singles chronology
"The Beach" (2003)	"Professional Distortion" (2004)	"Requiem for a Hit" (2004)

Music video
- "Professional Distortion" on YouTube

"Professional Distortion" is the debut solo single from Miss Kittin's debut solo album I Com. It became her first solo song to chart on the French and UK singles charts. It was later included on her 2005 EP Mixing Me.

== Critical reception ==
Lowri Williams of Gigwise.com said, "Heavily engrossed with unforgettable synthesisers and loops, this track really is electronic music at its best featuring the Queen of the scene." By contrast, Terry Sawyer of PopMatters commented that the song "wastes a beautiful bassline that rides into the speakers like a skipped stone by saddling it with the Ladytron monotone of the lyrics."

== Music videos ==
Two official music videos were made for "Professional Distortion". The original video featured Miss Kittin singing in a factory while workmen dance to the song. The second video was directed by Sven C. Steinmeyer and shows handwritten lyrics by Miss Kittin flash across the screen. A cartoon guitar player is featured at the beginning of the video.

== Live performances ==
Miss Kittin performed "Professional Distortion (Otto von Schirach Remix)" live at the Sónar festival and included it on her album Live at Sónar.

== Track listing ==
1. "Professional Distortion" (Original Mix) – 3:17
2. "Professional Distortion" (Otto von Schirach's God's Magnetic Cereal Pamper Mix) – 6:12
3. "Professional Distortion" (Modeselektor's Big Muff Mix) – 3:45
4. "Professional Distortion" (Kittin vs. Zdar Aka-Pella Mix) – 2:43

== Charts ==
Chart (2004)	Peak Position
France (SNEP)	77
UK Singles (The Official Charts Company)	83
UK Dance (The Official Charts Company)	4
