= Jahcoozi =

German electronica trio

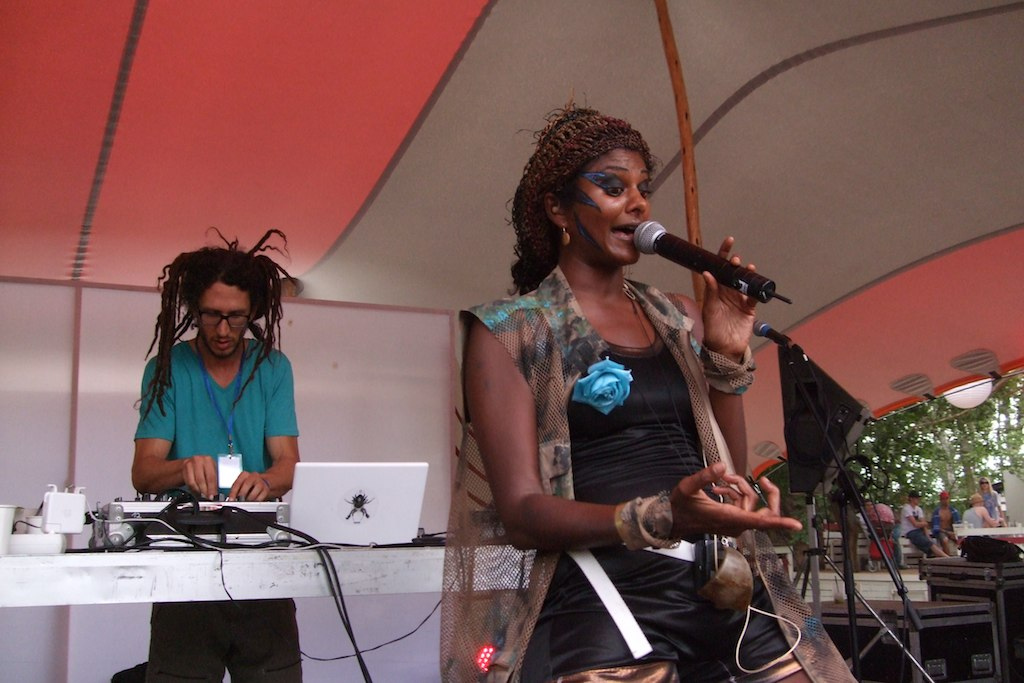
- Jahcoozi performing in 2010

Background information
- Origin: Berlin, Germany
- Genres: Downtempo
- Years active: 2002–present
- Members: Sasha Perera; Robot Koch; Oren Gerlitz

Jahcoozi is a German electronic music group made up of London-born, Sri Lankan-heritage songwriter and frontwoman Sasha Perera and two producers and instrumentalists, Robot Koch and Tel Aviv-born Oren Gerlitz. The band met and formed in Berlin in 2002 and have released three albums.

== History ==
In 2005, Jahcoozi were signed by Kitty-Yo, the Berlin-based mother label of Peaches. Later that year, they released the "Black Barbie" picture-disc vinyl and a full-length debut album entitled Pure Breed Mongrel. The trio have issued three full-length albums as well as numerous other releases, including EPs, picture discs, remixes, features, and a Japanese album. They have released music on labels including Kitty-Yo, Asound/K7, Playhouse, NinjaTune, Citizen Records, Crosstown Rebels, 1965, WMF Records, and Hydra. Barefoot Wanderer came out in 2010 on Ellen Alien's Berlin-based imprint BPitch Control.

== Musical style ==
Jahcoozi's sound has been described as consisting of abstract electronic beats within ragga, dub, and electronica; a mongrel style of avant-garde, electronic pop music. The group built up a solid fanbase with their underground shows in 2003. Songs such as "Black Barbie" and "Fish" gained them early recognition. The latter earned them a spotlight on the cult BBC show of the late John Peel, who called it "Beautiful pop music from the future". The album Barefoot Wanderer has been described as "one of the year's most disturbingly beautiful creations".

== Individual projects ==
Robot Koch also produces and performs as a solo artist under his own name and works as a songwriter and producer for many different artists internationally. Sasha Perera co-wrote and sang the song "Silikon", featured on Modeselektor's album Hello Mom! and on Thom Yorke's iTunes playlist in 2007.

== Collaborations ==
Jahcoozi have collaborated with and been remixed by a number of artists, including Modeselektor, Siriusmo, M.Sayiid, Barbara Panther, Ramadanman, Ikonika, Stereotyp, Asian Dub Foundation, Guillermo.E.Brown, Oliver $, RQM, King Cannibal, Mochipet, Rustie, Buraka Som Sistema, Missill, Stanton Warriors, Lexie Lee, D-Double, Tinchy Stryder, Lethal B, Kano, JME, Skepta, Ata + Sasse, Cassy, Luomo, New Flesh, Infinite Livez, Alhaca Soundsystem, Sukh Knight, Milanese, and Kalbata.

Their music has been used in games such as Grand Theft Auto and FIFA and has been featured on compilations such as the Wire Magazine Compilation and We Love Techno. The band has played at the televised opening of the IFFA Athletics World Cup at Berlin's Brandenburg Gate, the 2010 Shanghai Expo, and at clubs such as Fabric in London, Rex club in Paris, and Montreal's electronica-oriented Mutek Festival.

They travelled to Nairobi, Kenya, to participate in a music exchange project called BLNRB alongside fellow Berlin-based electronic musicians Modeselektor and Gebruder Teichmann.

== Discography ==
Studio albums

- Pure Breed Mongrel (2005)
- Blitz 'N' Ass (2007)
- Barefoot Wanderer (2010)

EPs

- Fish 12" (2003)
- V.A.: Girls EP (2004)
- Rebel Futurism Part2 (2004)
- Black Barbie EP (2005)
- Double Barrel Name (2007)
- BLN (2009)
- Namedropper (2009)
- Barbed Wire (2009)
- Watching You (2009)
- Barefoot Wanderer Remixes PT 1 (2010)
- Barefoot Wanderer Remixes PT 2 (2010)

Remix albums

- Nearly Naked: Barefoot Wanderer Remixes (2011)

Mixes and collaborations

- Panorama - "Super Race Monkey" (2003)
- Mendelson - "White Canary" (2004)
- Raz Ohara - "Hymn" (2005)
- Modeselektor feat. Jahcoozi – "Silikon" (2006)
- Unknownmix - "The Siren" (2006)
- "Black Barbie" - stereotyp remix (2006)
- Asian Dub Foundation - "Altered Statesmen (2009)
- King Cannibal feat. Jahcoozi - "Murder Us (2009)
