= I Com =

Studio album by Miss Kittin
- Released: 31 May 2004
- Genre: Electroclash; dance
- Length: 59:13
- Label: NovaMute
- Producer: Caroline Hervé; Tobias Neumann; Thies Mynther

Miss Kittin chronology
Radio Caroline Volume 1 (2002)	I Com (2004)	Mixing Me (2005)

Singles from I Com
- 1. "Professional Distortion" Released: 17 May 2004; 2. "Requiem for a Hit" Released: 27 September 2004; 3. "Happy Violentine" Released: 14 February 2005

I Com is the debut studio album by French singer and DJ Miss Kittin, released on 31 May 2004 by NovaMute Records. It is Miss Kittin's first solo release, having previously released albums in collaboration with The Hacker and Golden Boy. As in her previous works, electro-funk and electroclash continue to be the primary genres.

Most of the tracks on the album were produced by Miss Kittin with either Thies Mynther and Tobi Neumann (producers of Chicks on Speed). House music vocalist L.A. Williams raps on the track "Requiem for a Hit", the album's second single.

== Singles ==
"Professional Distortion" was released as the album's lead single on 17 May 2004. It peaked at number 83 on the UK Singles Chart and at number 77 on the French Singles Chart.

The second single, "Requiem for a Hit", was released on 27 September 2004. It peaked at number 92 on the UK Singles Chart and at number six on the Belgian Dance Chart.

"Happy Violentine" was released on 14 February 2005 as the third and final single. It reached number 84 on the UK Singles Chart and number nine on the Belgian Dance Chart.

== Promotion ==
Miss Kittin released the EP Mixing Me on 19 April 2005. The EP contains remixes of several I Com tracks such as its three singles.

== Critical reception ==
Professional ratings
Aggregate scores
Source	Rating
Metacritic	73/100
Review scores
Source	Rating
AllMusic	4.5/5 stars
Drowned in Sound	9/10
Entertainment Weekly	B+
Mojo	4/5 stars
Pitchfork	7.0/10
Playlouder	4.5/5 stars
Q	4/5 stars
Rolling Stone	3.5/5 stars
Spin	C+
URB	4/5 stars

I Com received generally favorable reviews from music critics. At Metacritic, which assigns a normalised rating out of 100 to reviews from mainstream publications, the album received an average score of 73, based on 17 reviews. Joseph Shoo of Drowned in Sound commented that I Com has the "sweet attitude of sheer independent energy" while containing "neural giddiness and cerebral edginess". Likewise, Johnny Loftus of AllMusic described I Com as "the best bits and pieces of the post-everything genres have been rearranged in a newfangled data stream to represent Miss Kittin's very elusive, entirely accessible muse. The alluring result is cool, reloaded." By contrast, Derek Miller of Pitchfork noted that "some of Kittin's lyrical deficits undercut her production."

== Track listing ==
All tracks are written by Caroline Hervé, Tobias Neumann and Thies Mynther, except where noted.

No.	Title	Writer(s)	Length
1.	"Professional Distortion"		3:42
2.	"Requiem for a Hit"		5:10
3.	"Happy Violentine"		6:18
4.	"Meet Sue Be She"		4:03
5.	"Kiss Factory"		4:37
6.	"Allergic"		5:26
7.	"Soundtrack of Now"	Michel Amato; Hervé; Neumann; Mynther	4:43
8.	"Dub About Me"	Michael Schmidt; Holger Zilske	7:10
9.	"Clone Me"		4:06
10.	"3eme Sexe"	Dominique Nicolas Leteurtre	5:00
11.	"I Come.com"		5:55
12.	"Neukölln 2"		3:03

== Personnel ==
Credits adapted from the liner notes of I Com.

=== Musicians ===
- Miss Kittin – vocals (tracks 2, 4); drums (track 4); programming (track 6); synth break (track 12)
- Otto von Schirach – programming (track 1)
- Tobi Neumann – guitar (track 1)
- L.A Williams – vocals (track 2)
- Thies Mynther – piano (tracks 2, 3, 10); bass, synths (track 4); programming (track 5)
- Tobi Neumann – programming (track 3); guitar (tracks 4, 9); vocoder (track 4); bass (track 9)
- Sue.Zuki – vocals (track 4)
- The Hacker – programming (tracks 7, 10); hectic breathing (track 7)
- Florian – vocals (track 12)

=== Technical ===
- Caroline Hervé – production
- Tobias Neumann – production
- Thies Mynther – production
- Rashad – mastering

=== Artwork ===
- Wolfgang Tillmans – pictures
- Miss Kittin – drawings, studio pics
- Bente Schipp – graphic design

== Charts ==
Chart performance for I Com
Chart (2004)	Peak position
Belgian Albums (Ultratop Flanders)	79
Belgian Alternative Albums (Ultratop Flanders)	43
Belgian Albums (Ultratop Wallonia)	77
Dutch Albums (Album Top 100)	82
French Albums (SNEP)	56
German Albums (Offizielle Top 100)	100
Swiss Albums (Schweizer Hitparade)	82
UK Albums (OCC)	171
UK Dance Albums (OCC)	6
UK Independent Albums (OCC)	18
US Top Dance/Electronic Albums (Billboard)	13
