= A Hum of Maybe =

2026 album by Apparat

Studio album by Apparat
- Released: 20 February 2026
- Genres: Electronic; Electronic pop
- Length: 51:16
- Label: Mute
- Producers: Sascha Ring; Philipp Thimm

Apparat chronology
| LP5 (2019) | A Hum of Maybe (2026) |

Singles from A Hum of Maybe
- 1. "An Echo Skips a Name (alternate take)" Released: 25 November 2025; 2. "Hum of Maybe" Released: 14 January 2026

A Hum of Maybe is the sixth studio album by German electronic musician Apparat. It was released on 20 February 2026 by Mute Records.

== Background ==
In the years preceding the release of the album, Sascha Ring, known under the moniker Apparat, faced intense writer's block and a loss of musical confidence. In order to overcome it, Ring challenged himself to write one song idea per day. The musician drew inspiration from love for his wife and daughter, with the challenge lasting from March to September 2025. Ring fleshed out eleven of the sketches alongside his longtime musical collaborator Philipp Johann Thimm and other associates. The resulting compositions reflect on the complexities of life.

== Release ==
A Hum of Maybe was announced on 25 November 2025. It was released on 20 February 2026 on limited edition double turquoise vinyl, double vinyl, CD and digitally. It is Ring's sixth studio album as Apparat, not counting soundtracks or his work as part of Moderat.

== Critical reception ==
Professional ratings
Review scores
| Source | Rating |
|---|---|
| musicOMH | 3.5/5 stars |
| Musikexpress | 5/6 stars |
| Uncut | 6/10 stars |
| AllMusic | 3.5/5 stars |

BrooklynVegan reviewer Bill Pearis stated that with A Hum Of Maybe, Apparat "turns writer's block into a lush, introspective return". He added that the album "feels lush, sophisticated, and cinematic", comparing it to Thom Yorke's solo work and, at its weaker moments, to Coldplay's "more soporific side". Stephen Dalton of Uncut gave the album a score of six stars out of ten and described it as "fusing granular samples and glitchy beats with chamber-folk arrangements and tender emo-pop vocals".

In AllMusic, Paul Simpson wrote that Ring's experience as a film score composer has affected how he approaches his songwriting and called A Hum of Maybe "one of his grandest releases".

== Track listing ==
All tracks are written by Sascha Ring and Philipp Thimm, except where noted.

| No. | Title | Writer(s) | Length |
|---|---|---|---|
| 1. | "Glimmerine" | | 6:03 |
| 2. | "A Slow Collision" | | 4:36 |
| 3. | "Gravity Test" | | 1:46 |
| 4. | "Tilth" (vocals by KÁRYYN) | | 3:50 |
| 5. | "Hum of Maybe" | | 5:34 |
| 6. | "An Echo Skips a Name" | | 5:18 |
| 7. | "Enough for Me" | | 3:49 |
| 8. | "Lunes" | | 5:45 |
| 9. | "Williamsburg" | | 5:00 |
| 10. | "Pieces, Falling" | Ring; Thimm; Jan-Philipp Lorenz | 5:51 |
| 11. | "Recalibration" | | 3:44 |
| Total length: | | | 51:16 |

== Personnel ==
Credits adapted from official liner notes.

- KÁRYYN – guest vocals (4), additional vocals
- Jörg Wähner – drums
- Joda Foerster – drums
- Christian "Koli" Kohlhaas – trombone
- Christoph "Mäckie" Hamann – bass, synths, noises
- Jan-Philipp Lorenz – synthesizer, additional programming (10)
- Philipp Thimm – cello, piano, autoharp, guitar
- Sascha Ring – mixing
- Zino Mikorey – mastering
- Carsten Aermes – cover design

== Charts ==
Chart performance for A Hum of Maybe
| Chart (2026) | Peak position |
|---|---|
| Belgian Albums (Ultratop Wallonia) | 63 |
| French Physical Albums (SNEP) | 84 |
| Swiss Albums (Schweizer Hitparade) | 95 |
| UK Album Downloads (Official Charts) | 50 |
| UK Independent Albums (Official Charts) | 40 |
