= Party de plaisir =

Studio album by Teki Latex
- Released: June 04, 2007
- Genre: Dance, electropop, French pop
- Length: 53:09
- Label: EMI Music France
- Producer: Gonzales & Renaud Létang

Singles from Party de plaisir
- 1. "Disco Dance With You" Released: July 31, 2006; 2. "Les Matins de Paris" Released: February 5, 2007

Professional ratings
Review scores
Source	Rating
PopMatters	2/10 stars

Party de plaisir is the debut album of French rapper Teki Latex. One fourth of French hip-hop group TTC, Latex opted to go electropop on his solo effort. Teki's album was released on June 4, 2007 and produced by Gonzales and Renaud Létang. The album's first single "Disco Dance With You", dropped in July 2006, with the second single, "Les Matins de Paris", a duet with 80s French singer, Lio, following in early 2007. Both singles are available as EPs. (A longer version of Latex's debut appears in the American iTunes Store with 3 additional remixed tracks.) For this album, Latex did a collaboration with French label Sixpack France and edited a limited t-shirt.

Teki Latex took the unusual approach of using alternative promotion methods that included a special parade across Paris' streets. An ice cream cart, modified to play Teki's new album over loudspeakers was pushed along in the parade while dedicated fans handed out balloons and candy. The parade ended with Teki himself hosting a listening party at Cafe de la Ville.

In France, the album peaked at #75 on the SNEP albums chart, on 9 June 2007.

== Track listing ==
No.	Title	Length
1.	"Rires"	0:15
2.	"Electronic"	4:22
3.	"J'aime la Pop Music"	2:42
4.	"Les matins de paris" (feat. Lio)	3:49
5.	"Go Go Go" (feat. The Genevan Heathen)	4:47
6.	"Petite fille qui ne veut pas grandir" (duet with Katerine)	3:47
7.	"Les jouets"	3:11
8.	"Polo"	2:58
9.	"Invitation to ooh wee" (feat. Gonzales)	3:37
10.	"Bonne soirée..." (feat. Sana Zeineddine)	3:08
11.	"Disco dance with you"	4:40
12.	"The ish" (feat. Bitch Lap Lap)	4:11
13.	"Crois en moi"	4:10
14.	"Sac à dos"	4:02
15.	"Polo" (Tacteel Remix feat. TTC)	3:30
