= Walls (Apparat album) =

Studio album by Apparat
- Released: 7 August 2007
- Recorded: 2006
- Genres: Electronic; glitch; IDM; dream pop
- Length: 59:53
- Labels: Shitkatapult; InFiné (FR); P-Vine Records (JP)
- Producer: Sascha Ring

Apparat chronology
Duplex (2003)	Walls (2007)	DJ-Kicks: Apparat (2010)

Singles from Walls
- 1. "Holdon" Released: 2007

Walls is a third solo studio album by German electronic musician Apparat. It was released on Shitkatapult on 7 August 2007. It was also released in France and Japan under licence to InFiné and P-Vine Records.

== Critical reception ==
Professional ratings
Review scores
Source	Rating
AllMusic	4/5 stars
eMusic	4/5 stars
Pitchfork	8.1/10
PopMatters	7/10 stars
Resident Advisor	3/5
Tiny Mix Tapes	4/5 marks

Ned Raggett of AllMusic gave the album 4 stars out of 5, commenting that it is "a remarkable album that ranks as his best yet." Nitsuh Abebe of Pitchfork, who gave the album an 8.1 out of 10, compared the album to the work of M83 and Slowdive, calling it "one of the best electronic dream-pop records in a while". He added, "The best of these tracks combine the mechanized pulse and sonic possibilities of techno with good old bliss-out dreams better than anything in a while."

== Track listing ==
All tracks are written by Sascha Ring, except where noted.

No.	Title	Writer(s)	Length
1.	"Not a Number"		3:59
2.	"Hailin from the Edge"	Raz Ohara; Sascha Ring	3:39
3.	"Useless Information"		4:04
4.	"Limelight"		4:12
5.	"Holdon"	Raz Ohara; Sascha Ring	4:10
6.	"Fractales, Pt. 1"		3:34
7.	"Fractales, Pt. 2"		2:06
8.	"Birds"		5:03
9.	"Arcadia"		5:10
10.	"You Don't Know Me"		4:24
11.	"Headup"	Raz Ohara; Sascha Ring	5:06
12.	"Over and Over"	Raz Ohara; Sascha Ring	5:07
13.	"Like Porcelain"		9:19
Total length:			59:53

Japanese release tracks
No.	Title	Length
1.	"Not a Number"	3:59
2.	"Hailin from the Edge"	3:39
3.	"Useless Information"	4:04
4.	"Limelight"	4:12
5.	"Holdon"	4:10
6.	"Fractales, Pt. 1"	3:34
7.	"Fractales, Pt. 2"	2:06
8.	"Birds"	5:03
9.	"Arcadia"	5:10
10.	"You Don't Know Me"	4:24
11.	"Headup"	5:06
12.	"Over and Over"	5:07
13.	"Like Porcelain"	2:48
14.	"Holdon A-Minor Version"	9:44
Total length:		63:07

== Personnel ==
Credits adapted from liner notes.

- Sascha Ring – vocals (8, 9), production
- Kathrin Pfänder – strings
- Lisa Stepf – strings
- Raz Ohara – vocals (2, 5, 11, 12)
- Simon Berz – drums (9)
- Jörg Wähner – drums (11, 12)
- Joshua Eustis – mixing
- Roger Seibel – mastering
- Maria Hinze – painting
- Ivan Negro – Apparat logo

== Charts ==
Chart	Peak position
Belgian Albums (Ultratop Flanders)	94
