= Moderat (album) =

Studio album by Moderat
- Released: 11 May 2009
- Genres: Electronic; minimal techno; IDM
- Length: 55:10
- Label: BPitch Control
- Producers: Gernot Bronsert; Sascha Ring; Sebastian Szary

Moderat chronology
Auf Kosten der Gesundheit (2002)	Moderat (2009)	II (2013)

Modeselektor chronology
Happy Birthday! (2007)	Moderat (2009)	Modeselektion Vol. 01 (2010)

Apparat chronology
Things to Be Frickled: Parts & Remixes (2008)	Moderat (2009)	DJ-Kicks: Apparat (2010)

Moderat is the self-titled debut studio album by electronic music project Moderat, consisting of Modeselektor and Apparat. It was released on 11 May 2009 on BPitch Control.

The track A New Error was used in the film Laurence Anyways directed by Xavier Dolan in 2012..

== Critical Reception ==
Professional ratings
Review scores
Source	Rating
AllMusic	3.5/5 stars
Pitchfork	7.6/10
PopMatters	7/10

== Track listing ==
No.	Title	Length
1.	"A New Error"	6:07
2.	"Rusty Nails"	4:32
3.	"Seamonkey"	6:14
4.	"Slow Match (feat. Paul St. Hilaire)"	5:08
5.	"3 Minutes of"	3:17
6.	"Nasty Silence"	3:13
7.	"Sick with It" (feat. Dellé a.k.A Eased from Seeed)	3:45
8.	"Porc #1"	2:40
9.	"Porc #2"	3:03
10.	"Les Grandes Marches"	4:28
11.	"Berlin"	1:22
12.	"No. 22"	5:40
13.	"Out of Sight"	5:41
Total length:		55:10

Deluxe Edition bonus tracks
No.	Title	Length
14.	"BeatsWaySick" (feat. Busdriver)	4:23
15.	"Rusty Nails" (Shackleton Remix)	9:38
Total length:		69:11

== Bonus DVD ==
1. "Les Grandes Marches"
2. "Rusty Nails"
3. "Woltersdorf" (Interlude)
4. "BeatsWaySick" (feat. Busdriver)
5. "Rüdersdorf" (Interlude)
6. "Out of Sight"
7. "Berlin" (Interlude)
8. "A New Error"
9. "Quedlinburg" (Interlude)
10. "No. 22"
11. "Seamonkey" (Easter Egg)

== Charts ==
Chart (2009)	Peak position
Belgian Albums (Ultratop Flanders)	80
French Albums (SNEP)	180
