= Max Turner (musician) =

Scottish-German musician

- Genres: Alternative hiphop, rapping, electronic music, spoken word
- Occupations: Singer, songwriter, record producer
- Instruments: Vocals, laptop, synthesizers
- Years active: 1999–present
- Website: Official website

Max Turner is a Scottish-German vocalist, producer and songwriter. He is known for being one of the core founders and contributors of the Puppetmastaz , as well as releasing a steady flow of collaborative and solo projects in his distinctive style of rhythm & poetry since his debut in 2001

== Life and career ==
=== Career ===
In 1999 Turner moved to Berlin and founded Puppetmastaz with his cousin Paul Affeld , Chilly Gonzales and several others. They were joined by Taylor Savvy to form the short lived rap-quartet The Bench which featured on a Tommy Boy Records release among others. The album Lost Treasures furthermore features early collaborations between the above-mentioned Mc's and producers such as Patric Catani, Bomb20 and Nitro, all of whom are considered the artistic bedrock of the Puppetmastaz crew. Other artists that Turner collaborated with and who influenced him during these formative professional years in Berlin include Peaches and Gina V. D'Orio of Cobrakiller as well as Jamie Lidell with whom he collaborated on the Puppetmastaz single Scandalous.

Working with Producer Marcus Rossknecht he founded the band Meteorites in Barcelona where he lived for a significant period and signed to Cristian Vogel's Rise Robots Rise Records. His first solo album The purple pro, produced in Stockholm, gained some underground recognition that garnered further momentum through a string of collaborative releases with producers such as SchneiderTM for Cityslang, Cristian Vogel for Novamute and Matias Aguayo's De Papel for Kompakt records. He has also contributed vocals to several releases by Japanese sound artist Kouhei Matsunaga on labels such as Important Records, Wordsound and Autechre's Skam label under the alternative moniker Google Premiere;.

In 2011 The Hindu newspaper reported that Turner had performed in Hydrabad and was studying Indian classical music , exploring the subcontinent and founding a live project called The Migrations with several collaborators which contributed to the Boarder movement in Colombo, Sri Lanka. Turner has worked as an arranger, producer and songwriter for several seasons of runway shows by Vivienne Westwood under the direction of Dominik Emrich.

== Solo projects and solo releases ==
Turner has released music both under his own name and under a number of aliases and project names. The alias Google Premier is documented, alongside variations such as M. Turner, Max B. Turner, Max P. B. Turner, Max Turner aka Jack Burner, Max Turner, The Purple Pro, Maxwell Turner and Turner.

His first solo album, The Purple Pro, was released in 2006 on the Metabooty label. This was followed by a series of independent releases in 2008, including Infinite 4x4 (Folklore Rhythm), Oranges and the Reflections On Liquid EP, also issued via Metabooty. In 2017, Turner released the single Fistful of Leaves.

In later years, Turner continued to publish solo material through digital platforms such as Bandcamp, including Cuckoo Clock (2018), Fire And Stonewalls (2021), Something Or Nothing (2022) and Forever’s Child (2025).

A new solo album, Seeds Of The Unknown, has been announced for 2026 via the label Staatsakt (Fun In The Church), preceded by the single Nothing’s Pure.

== Selected solo discography ==
- The Purple Pro (2006, album, Metabooty)
- Infinite 4x4 (Folklore Rhythm) (2008, single, Metabooty)
- Oranges (2008, single, Metabooty)
- Reflections On Liquid EP (2008, EP, Metabooty)
- Fistful of Leaves (2017, single)
- Cuckoo Clock (2018)
- Fire And Stonewalls (2021)
- Something Or Nothing (2022)
- Forever’s Child (2025)
- Nothing’s Pure (2026, single)
- Seeds Of The Unknown (announced for 2026, album)

== Selected discography ==
- Prosetti's Disco Balls – Puppetmastaz (2004, LP, Puppetmastaz Records PM01)
- Creature Funk – Puppetmastaz (2003, released on New Noise; later editions via Virgin/Labels)
- Zoology – Puppetmastaz (2003, single, New Noise)
- Dub The Mighty Dragon – Meteorites (2003, Rise Robots Rise)
- Milkman – Meteorites (2003, 7", Rise Robots Rise, RRR 003)
- Pet Sound – Puppetmastaz (2002, single, New Noise / Virgin / Labels)
- Humans Get All The Credit – Puppetmastaz (2002, 12", New Noise / Virgin)
- Matchbox Jump & Jeepbeats – Max Turner & Moonbuggy (2001, 12", Gagarin Records GR2006)
- Lost Treasures – Lost Treasures (2003, CD, Make Some Noise / Audio Chocolate)

== Features / collaborations ==
- Lost On Earth – Gebrüder Teichmann (2017, album, Noland Records)
- yx aka 1ch aka Solo – NHKyx (2011, CD, Skam Records)
- Self VA. – Kouhei Matsunaga (2010, CD, Important Records)
- Wear This World Out – Night Of The Brain (2007, CD, Station 55 Records)
- Škoda Mluvit – Schneider TM (2006, CD/2xLP, City Slang)
- De Papel – Matias Aguayo (2005, 12", Kompakt; feat. Max Turner)
- Station 55 – Cristian Vogel (2005, CD/2x12", Novamute)
- Special Gunpowder – DJ /rupture (2004, CD, Tigerbeat6)
