= III (Moderat album) =

Studio album by Moderat
- Released: 1 April 2016
- Genres: Electronic; microhouse; electropop
- Length: 42:30
- Label: Monkeytown

Moderat chronology
II (2013)	III (2016)	More D4ta (2022)

Singles from III
- 1. "Reminder" Released: 19 February 2016; 2. "Running" Released: 18 May 2016; 3. "Eating Hooks" Released: 7 October 2016

III is the third studio album by electronic trio Moderat. It was released on April 1, 2016. III is the third installment to Moderat's album trilogy that includes Moderat and II.

This was Moderat's final studio album before their initial hiatus at the end of their Berlin Tour in September 2017, before they decided to perform together again in 2021.

== Critical Reception ==
Professional ratings
Aggregate scores
Source	Rating
Metacritic	77/100
Review scores
Source	Rating
Clash	9/10
Pitchfork	7.1/10
Resident Advisor	3.5/5 stars
AllMusic	4/5 stars
Exclaim!	8/10
PopMatters	7/10 stars
The Skinny	4/5 stars

== Track listing ==
No.	Title	Length
1.	"Eating Hooks"	4:32
2.	"Running"	3:51
3.	"Finder"	5:20
4.	"Ghostmother"	5:57
5.	"Reminder"	3:54
6.	"The Fool"	4:12
7.	"Intruder"	4:38
8.	"Animal Trails"	4:38
9.	"Ethereal"	5:28
Total length:		42:30

== Charts ==
Chart (2016)	Peak position
Austrian Albums (Ö3 Austria)	5
Belgian Albums (Ultratop Flanders)	11
Belgian Albums (Ultratop Wallonia)	19
Dutch Albums (Album Top 100)	8
French Albums (SNEP)	56
German Albums (Offizielle Top 100)	5
Irish Albums (IRMA)	63
Italian Albums (FIMI)	30
Italian Vinyl Records (FIMI)	9
Polish Albums (ZPAV)	24
Swiss Albums (Schweizer Hitparade)	5
UK Albums (Official Charts)	53

=== Year-end charts ===
Chart (2016)	Position
Belgian Albums (Ultratop Flanders)	147
