= Batards Sensibles =

Studio album by TTC
- Released: October 25, 2004
- Genre: Hip-hop
- Length: 47:47
- Label: Big Dada
- Producers: Tacteel, Para One, Tido Berman

TTC chronology
Ceci N'est Pas Un Disque (2002)	Batards Sensibles (2004)	3615 TTC (2007)

Singles from Batards Sensibles
- 1. "Dans Le Club" Released: May 17, 2004

Professional ratings
Review scores
Source	Rating
AllMusic	3.5/5 stars
Exclaim!	favorable
Pitchfork	8.0/10
Stylus Magazine	B
XLR8R	favorable

Batards Sensibles is the second studio album by French hip-hop group TTC. It was released on Big Dada in 2004.

== Critical reception ==
Joshua Glazer of AllMusic said: "Dense analog synths and rugged 808 beats reference the good-times party vibe of '80s rap, although many of these tracks are digitally fractured to give things an updated feel." Meanwhile, Peter Macia of Pitchfork gave the album an 8.0 out of 10, saying: "Teki [Latex], Tido [Berman], and Cuizinier are as captivating and entertaining as any, despite the language barrier."

== Track listing ==
No.	Title	Producer(s)	Length
1.	"Ebisu Rendez-vous"	Tacteel	3:59
2.	"Dans Le Club"	Para One	3:57
3.	"Le Chant Des Hommes"	Para One	4:54
4.	"Du Sang Sur Le Dancefloor"	Tacteel	4:07
5.	"Catalogue"	Para One	2:40
6.	"J'ai Pas Sommeil"	Para One	3:01
7.	"Rap Jeu"	Tido Berman	4:24
8.	"Latest Dance Craze" (featuring Busdriver and Radioinactive)	Tido Berman	4:55
9.	"Girlfriend"	Tacteel	3:31
10.	"Batard Sensible"	Para One	5:08
11.	"Codeine"	Para One	3:11
12.	"Meet the New Boss" (featuring Out One)	Para One, Tacteel	4:00

== Charts ==
Chart (2004)	Peak position
French Albums (SNEP)	77
