= Krieg und Frieden (Music for Theatre) =

2013 studio album by Apparat

Studio album by Apparat
- Released: 15 February 2013
- Genre: Electronic
- Length: 45:00
- Label: Mute Records
- Producer: Sascha Ring; Nackt

Apparat chronology
The Devil's Walk (2011)	Krieg und Frieden (Music for Theatre) (2013)	LP5 (2019)

Krieg und Frieden (Music for Theatre) is a studio album by Apparat. It was released on Mute Records on 15 February 2013. The album is adapted from the soundtrack Apparat composed for the 2012 Ruhr Festival stage production of War and Peace directed by Sebastian Hartmann.

== Critical reception ==
Professional ratings
Aggregate scores
Source	Rating
Metacritic	70/100
Review scores
Source	Rating
AllMusic	3/5 stars
Consequence of Sound	C+
Drowned in Sound	9/10
Exclaim!	9/10
Fact	3.5/5
Pitchfork	7.5/10
PopMatters	6/10 stars

At Metacritic, which assigns a weighted average score out of 100 to reviews from mainstream critics, the album received an average score of 70, based on 11 reviews, indicating "generally favorable reviews".

== Track listing ==
All tracks are written by Sascha Ring.

No.	Title	Length
1.	"44"	2:37
2.	"44 (Noise Version)"	6:46
3.	"LightOn"	5:23
4.	"Tod"	2:47
5.	"Blank Page"	4:39
6.	"Pv"	6:46
7.	"K&F Thema (Pizzicato)"	3:12
8.	"K&F Thema"	4:18
9.	"Austerlitz"	3:21
10.	"A Violent Sky"	5:11
Total length:		45:00

== Personnel ==
Credits adapted from liner notes.

- Sascha Ring – performance, production, mixing
- Christoph Mäckie Hamann – performance
- Phillip Thimm – performance
- Nackt – production
- Jörg Wähner – additional drums
- Christian Kolhaas – trombone (6)
- Giovanni Nicoletta – recording
- Kai Blankenberg – mastering
- Tilo Baumgärtel – cover art
- Kiosk Royal – layout

== Charts ==
Chart	Peak position
Belgian Albums (Ultratop Flanders)	72
Belgian Albums (Ultratop Wallonia)	135
