= Justine Electra =

Australian musician (born c.1978)

- Born: c. 1978
- Origin: Melbourne, Victoria, Australia
- Genres: conscious pop; post-folk; weird folk; rap; bluegrass; country; singer-songwriter; Tech house
- Occupations: Musician; DJ
- Instruments: Vocals; guitar; synthesiser; piano
- Years active: 2000–present
- Labels: City Slang; Neunvolt

Justine Electra is an Australian-born multi-instrumentalist, singer-songwriter and tech house DJ. She is based in Berlin, Germany. Her debut album, Soft Rock was released in June 2006 to a positive reception. The second album, Green Disco, appeared in December 2013. The third album Christmas in Berlin was a 3 song and 3 remix EP produced by Abshagen/Electra and featuring Christiane Rösinger and Cummi Flu on it. It was released shortly before Christmas in 2018.

== Biography ==
Justine Electra grew up in Melbourne and attended Wesley College. From 2000 she has been based in Berlin where she was to "hone a style of acoustic guitar-driven electro-pop that welcomed comparisons to Imogen Heap and Regina Spektor." She was signed to City Slang Records in 2006.

Her debut album, Soft Rock, appeared on 9 June 2006. Heather Phares of AllMusic rated the album at four-out-of-five stars and observed, "with her smooth, breathy alto and acoustic guitars gliding over synths and understated electronic rhythms, she comes across as a more lighthearted cross between Cat Power and Dido, or Beth Orton with a more eccentric songwriting style." Soft Rock was voted one of the top ten most important albums of 2006 by Der Spiegel, and Andreas Borcholte wrote that "there really hasn't been a more unagitated record this exciting this year." Clash magazine observed that "hissing percussion and soft strummed guitar sit behind Electra’s rich, bluesy American-influenced voice, but this basis is transformed track by track by imagination and experimentation."

Justine Electra's music has featured in several films, TV series, and documentaries, including episodes of The L Word, and German film Mein Vogel Fliegt Schneller (2009). Her cover version of Will Oldham's I See a Darkness closes out the credits of Till Kuenzel's documentary SubBerlin - Underground United about techno club Tresor.

Electra's second album, Green Disco, was issued on 6 December 2013 via Neun Volt Records.

Justine Electra has collaborated with musicians in Berlin's music scene, including Robot Koch, Robert Kretzschmar, Jens Friebe, Andre Abshagen, Julie Miess, Juli Holz, Lars Eidinger, Masha Qrella, Schneider TM, Vredeber Albrecht, Stephan Rühl, and Gerd Krüger. She records her music either at home in her studio or at Gerd Krüger's Tritonus Studio in Berlin Kreuzberg or at Soundtrax Studio in Schoeneberg.

Justine Electra made her film debut in 2006 in an episode of the German crime series "Soko Köln" in the episode "Der Dicke Fisch".

== Discography ==
Albums

- Soft Rock (2006)
- Green Disco (2013)

Singles and EPs

- Blues & Reds (2006)
- Fancy Robots (2006)
- Killalady (2007)
- Petting Zoo (2012)
- Great Skate Date (2013)
- Christmas In Berlin (2018)

== Soundtracks ==
- Hotel Very Welcome (2007)
- SubBerlin - Underground United (2008)
- The L Word, Season 6, Episodes 02 and 03 (2009)
- Mein Vogel fliegt schneller (2009)
- Meine Freiheit, Deine Freiheit (2011)
- Von Bienen und Blumen (2018)
- Electric Girl (2019)
