= Puppetmastaz =

German hip hop group

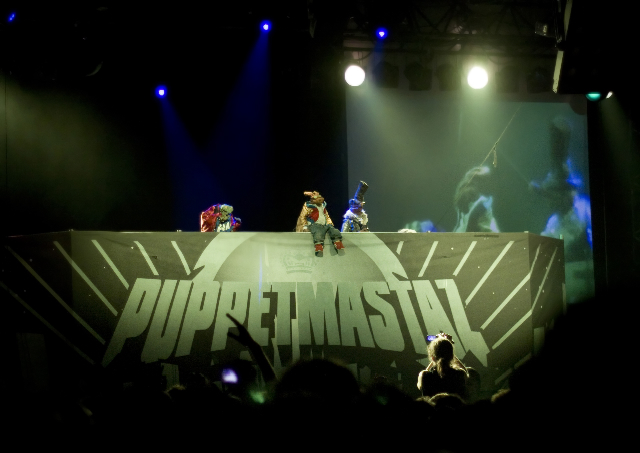
- Puppetmastaz at Marionnettissimo Festival

Background information
- Origin: Berlin, Germany
- Genre: Hip hop
- Years active: 1996–present
- Labels: Vicious Circle; Louisville Records
- Website: www.puppetmastaz.com

Puppetmastaz are a German hip hop group founded in Berlin in the 1990s. Their performances are staged through hand puppets, while the music combines elements of rap, funk, and electronica.

The project was created by the Berlin artist Alexander Tiller, Max Turner and Paul Affeld, also known as Paul PM, Paul Affeldo, and Mr. Maloke, who still remains its founder, bandleader, and central creative figure. Over time, the group has included or collaborated with artists such as Max Turner, Chilly Gonzales, Mocky, Dave Szigeti, David Skiba, N1tro, Patric Cremer, Alexander Tiller, Adam Traynor, Blake Worrell, and Zhi MC.

Among the more recent or current members are Paul Affeld, Pilo (Adrian Ilea), Jamiro Vanta, Pyro Merz, Jakob Wagner, and Louis Kassowitz, who has also handled management for the group.

== History ==
The puppets that would later form the Puppetmastaz universe first appeared in 1996 at Berlin's Ex-Kreuz-Club. The group's first performances as a hip hop act took place in 1999, the same year as their first music video, Wick-a-Woo. The puppets first appeared on television in 2000.

The group gained recognition beyond Berlin with releases such as Pet Sound and Bigger The Better. On stage, only the puppets are visible to the audience. As in many hip hop projects, the instrumental tracks are played by a DJ, while the rap parts are performed live.

The central stage figure is Mr. Maloke, a mole in a large top hat performed by Paul Affeld. According to the group's own history, Affeld initiated the project in the late 1990s, and additional puppets from various backgrounds were gradually added over time.

In 2002, the group released its first maxi-EP, Humans Get All The Credits, which significantly raised its profile. In 2003, this was followed by the EPs Pet Sound and Zoology, as well as the album Creature Funk. In 2004, the remix record Prosettis Disco Balls was issued in a self-pressed limited vinyl edition. In October 2005, the EP Bigger The Better and the album Creature Shock Radio were released.

Puppetmastaz have been described as the "first toy group" and have performed both locally and internationally. The group found particularly strong support in France, where its audience became significantly larger than in Germany. According to accounts associated with the group, some shows there drew up to 5,000 people, and festival appearances reached audiences of up to 100,000, including at events such as Rock en Seine.

Producers associated with at least three albums include N1tro, Patric Catani and Bomb 20. According to the group's credits, only Paul Affeld and Max Turner contributed to all five of the group's early albums.

According to the group's members, the name Puppetmastaz reflects the question of manipulation and control, summed up in the line "who's the puppet and who's the master?"

In 2007, the group released a cover version of John Lennon's "Give Peace a Chance" in support of Amnesty International. In June 2009, Puppetmastaz launched their satirical magazine Puppetry Fair - The Glossy Gossip Gazette. In the same year, they toured in Germany, Spain, France, Austria, Japan, and Belgium. The group returned in 2012 with the album Revolve and Step Up!, released on 26 March 2012.

The group's sixth studio album, Keep Yo Animal, was released on 27 May 2016 and included, among other guests, the French artist Hippocampe Fou. In May 2016, the group was announced for the Z'Éclectiques festival in France, and on 29 October 2016 they performed at the Rockomotives festival in Vendôme.

In October 2010, the group also toured China.

== Collaborations and related projects ==
In addition to his work with Puppetmastaz, Paul Affeld has maintained an extensive body of independent projects under the names Paul PM, Paul Affeldo, and Mr. Maloke.

Credits attributed to Puppetmastaz as a band should be distinguished from Affeld's personal collaborations under his various aliases. In clearly designated band credits, Puppetmastaz collaborated with Le Peuple de l'Herbe (Le Peuple de l'Herbe feat. Puppetmastaz: El Paso, 2004), Angie Reed (Puppetmastaz feat. Angie Reed: Give Peace A Chance, 2007), Modeselektor (Modeselektor feat. Puppetmastaz: The Dark Side Of The Sun, 2007), and T.Raumschmiere (T.Raumschmiere feat. Puppetmastaz: Animal Territory, 2008).

Separate from these group collaborations are Affeld's own solo and guest appearances as Paul PM and Mr. Maloke. As the group's founder and bandleader, he has also worked independently with Patric Catani (Patric Catani & Paul PM: Discovering Steve Hive EP, 2000; also Firesplinter, 2000), Chilly Gonzales (Chilly Gonzales feat. Paul PM: Meditation, 2000/2001; contributions to Z and Chilly Gonzales feat. Paul PM: (Another) So-Called Party, 2003), Peaches (Chilly Gonzales feat. Paul PM & Peaches: Insanity, 2002), Electrocute (Electrocute feat. Paul PM: Kleiner Dicker Junge, 2002), Candie Hank (Candie Hank feat. Paul PM: All the Sunshine Was Wrong on Kimouchi, 2003), The Lost Treasures (as a member of the project The Lost Treasures, Lost Treasures, 2003), Mocky (Paul PM credit on Are + Be, 2004), Trost (Paul PM credits on Trost, 2004), Bus and MC Soom-T (Paul PM credit on Middle Of The Road, 2003; Bus feat. MC Soom-T with a Paul PM credit on Feelin’ Dank, 2005), Schlachthofbronx (Schlachthofbronx feat. Paul PM: Dirty Dancing, 2012), Mouse on Mars and Mouse on Mars & Modeselektor (Mouse on Mars feat. Mr. Maloke: Purple Fog, 2014), as well as Frag Maddin (Frag Maddin feat. Paul PM: Back Up, 2015).

In addition to his musical work, Affeld has developed independent theatre productions in the field of puppetry, particularly for children. These include Frankensteins Rotkäppchen and Das Kristallherz, which were staged, among other venues, at the Volksbühne and the Theater an der Parkaue in Berlin. Since 2021, he has also been working on the children's puppet theatre production Micky Mickrig und die großen Wünsche.

== Puppets ==
- Mr. Maloke
- Panic the Pig
- Snuggles the Bunny
- Wizard the Lizard
- Ducci Prosetti
- HipHopNotist
- Frogga
- Ricardo Prosetti
- Flix
- Turbid the Toad
- Ryno
- Pit
- Dino Prosetti
- E-Wizz
- Midi Mighty Moe
- Big Eye
- Rita
- Keil Pittler
- Bloke
- Croucholina
- Croucho
- Lisa
- Buddah
- Richelieux
- Hammerhead
- Dogga Dacoda
- Dojo
- Harold
- BumbleBee
- DC-Gold
- Buggles
- Squidrick a.k.a. Squid One
- Tango
- J.B.
- Peppino
- Orango-Thang

== Discography ==
=== Studio albums ===
- Creature Funk (2003)
- Creature Shock Radio (2005)
- The Takeover (2008)
- The Break Up (2009)
- Revolve and Step Up! (2012)
- Keep Yo Animal! (2016)
- Sweet Sugar Rush (2019)
- Welcome to the Zoo (2023)

=== Live albums ===
- Clones - Live in Berlin (2006)

=== EPs and singles ===
- Humans Get All The Credits (2002)
- Pet Sound (2003)
- Zoology (2003)
- Prosettis Disco Balls (2004)
- Bigger The Better (2005)
