= The Devil's Walk (album) =

Album by electronic musician Apparat

Studio album by Apparat
- Released: 27 September 2011
- Genres: Electronic, dreampop, indie
- Length: 47:29
- Label: Mute Records
- Producers: Sascha Ring; Nackt; Joshua Eustis

Apparat chronology
DJ-Kicks: Apparat (2010)	The Devil's Walk (2011)	Krieg und Frieden (Music for Theatre) (2013)

Singles from The Devil's Walk
- 1. "Ash/Black Veil" Released: 6 May 2011; 2. "Black Water" Released: 18 August 2011; 3. "Song of Los" Released: 26 September 2011; 4. "Candil de la Calle" Released: 26 March 2012

The Devil's Walk is a studio album by Apparat. It was released on Mute Records on 27 September 2011. The song Goodbye featuring Soap&Skin on vocals was used as the theme song for the Netflix series Dark.

== Critical reception ==
Professional ratings
Aggregate scores
Source	Rating
Metacritic	76/100
Review scores
Source	Rating
AllMusic	4/5 stars
Clash	8/10
Consequence of Sound	B
Drowned in Sound	6/10
Fact	3/5
The Guardian	4/5 stars
MusicOMH	4/5 stars
Pitchfork	6.6/10
PopMatters	7/10 stars
Sputnikmusic	3/5

At Metacritic, which assigns a weighted average score out of 100 to reviews from mainstream critics, the album received an average score of 76, based on 16 reviews, indicating "generally favorable reviews".

== Track listing ==
All tracks are written by Sascha Ring, except where noted.

No.	Title	Writer(s)	Length
1.	"Sweet Unrest"	Sascha Ring; Nackt	3:33
2.	"Song of Los"		4:34
3.	"Black Water"	Sascha Ring; Alfredo Noguiera	4:42
4.	"Goodbye" (w/ Soap&Skin)	Sascha Ring; Anja Franziska Plaschg	4:29
5.	"Candil de la Calle"		4:37
6.	"The Soft Voices Die"	Sascha Ring; Nackt	4:22
7.	"Escape"		5:46
8.	"Ash/Black Veil"		5:44
9.	"A Bang in the Void"		6:01
10.	"Your House Is My World"		3:54
Total length:			47:29

== Personnel ==
Credits adapted from liner notes.

- Sascha Ring – production, guitar, mandolin, piano, instruments
- Nackt – choir (1), production, string arrangement, guitar, mandolin, piano, instruments
- Berlin String Theory – strings
- Göteborg String Theory – strings
- Jörg Wähner – drums
- Cherie – choir (1)
- Alfredo Noguiera – guitar (3)
- Joshua Eustis – production (3, 9, 10)
- Anja Franziska Plascha – guest vocals (4)
- Thimo Pommerening – vibraphone (6)
- Charles Gorczynski – horns (9)
- Flavio Etcheto – horns (9)
- Simon Bauer – upright bass (9)
- Der Onkel – marimba (9)
- David Haller – vibraphone (9)
- Giovanni Nicoletta – mixing
- Kai Blankenberg – mastering
- Hanna Zeckau – illustration
- Carsten Aermes – layout

== Charts ==
Chart	Peak position
Belgian Albums (Ultratop Flanders)	59
French Albums (SNEP)	137
