= Requiem for a Hit =

Single by Miss Kittin featuring L.A. Williams

from the album I Com
- Released: September 27, 2004
- Genre: Electronica, electroclash
- Label: NovaMute
- Songwriter(s): Caroline Hervé, Thies Mynther, Tobias Neumann
- Producer(s): Thies Mynther, Tobias Neumann

Miss Kittin singles chronology
"Professional Distortion" (2004)	"Requiem for a Hit" (2004)	"Happy Violentine" (2005)

"Requiem for a Hit" is a song by French recording artist Miss Kittin featuring L.A. Williams. It is the second single from the Miss Kittin's first solo album I Com. Co-written and co-produced by Thies Mynther, Tobias Neumann, it is composed as an electroclash and electropop song, that is a play on the line "I'll Beat that Bitch with a Bat." The song was later included on her 2005 EP Mixing Me.

== Critical reception ==
XLR8R said, "From succulent rhymes to seductively sexual appeal, this girl knows well how to live on charts worldwide."

Les Inrockuptibles placed "Requiem for a Hit" at #38 on the Best Singles of 2004.

== Live performances ==
Miss Kittin performed "Requiem for a Hit (2 Many DJ's Remix)" live at the Sónar festival and included it on her album Live at Sónar.

== Track listing ==
1. "Requiem For A Hit (Original Requiem)" - 5:12
2. "Requiem For A Hit (Ge-Gm Mix)" - 6:12
3. "Requiem For A Hit (Requiem For A Buzz)" - 6:00
4. "Requiem For A Hit (Abe Duque Remix)" - 6:29

== Charts ==
Chart (2004)	Peak Position
Belgium Dance (Ultratop)	6
UK Singles (The Official Charts Company)	92
UK Dance (The Official Charts Company)	11
UK Indie (The Official Charts Company)	26
