= II (Moderat album) =

Studio album by Moderat
- Released: 6 August 2013
- Genres: Electronic; minimal techno; microhouse; IDM
- Length: 53:21
- Label: Monkeytown

Moderat chronology
Moderat (2009)	II (2013)	III (2016)

Singles from II
- 1. "Bad Kingdom" Released: 28 June 2013; 2. "Gita" Released: 9 October 2013; 3. "Last Time" Released: 17 January 2014

II is the second studio album by electronic trio Moderat. It was released in August 2013 on Monkeytown Records in Europe while it was distributed by Mute Records in North America. The album sold more than 75,000 copies over Europe.

A minute of the opening track The Mark (Interlude) was used in the 2018 science fiction horror film Annihilation.

== Critical Reception ==
Professional ratings
Aggregate scores
Source	Rating
AnyDecentMusic?	7.0/10
Metacritic	74/100
Review scores
Source	Rating
AllMusic	4/5 stars
Clash	9/10
Mixmag	4/5
Mojo	3/5 stars
NME	7/10
Pitchfork	7.4/10
Q	3/5 stars
Resident Advisor	4.5/5
Spin	7/10
XLR8R	8/10

== Track listing ==
No.	Title	Length
1.	"The Mark (Interlude)"	1:36
2.	"Bad Kingdom"	4:22
3.	"Versions"	5:10
4.	"Let in the Light"	4:15
5.	"Milk"	10:04
6.	"Therapy"	5:45
7.	"Gita"	4:22
8.	"Clouded (Interlude)"	1:33
9.	"Ilona"	5:03
10.	"Damage Done"	5:26
11.	"This Time"	5:45
12.	"Last Time" (Deluxe edition bonus track)	5:15

== Charts ==
Chart (2013)	Peak position
Austrian Albums (Ö3 Austria)	23
Belgian Albums (Ultratop Flanders)	27
Belgian Albums (Ultratop Wallonia)	50
Danish Albums (Hitlisten)	34
Dutch Albums (Album Top 100)	34
French Albums (SNEP)	112
German Albums (Offizielle Top 100)	10
Swiss Albums (Schweizer Hitparade)	11
UK (OfficialCharts.com)	73
