= More D4ta =

MORE D4TA

Studio album by Moderat
- Released: May 13, 2022
- Genre: Electronic; ambient; IDM
- Length: 44:49
- Label: Monkeytown

Moderat chronology
III (2016)	MORE D4TA (2022)

Singles from More D4ta
- 1. "Fast Land" Released: February 9, 2022; 2. "Easy Prey" Released: March 9, 2022; 3. "More Love" Released: April 1, 2022

MORE D4TA (anagram of "Moderat 4") is the fourth studio album by electronic trio Moderat, and their first after a six-year hiatus. Released on May 13, 2022, it was preceded by the release of the singles Fast Land, Easy Prey and More Love.

The group embarked on an international tour in support of the album, which started in June 2022.

On March 17, 2023, EVEN MORE D4TA, a remix album, was released, featuring remixes from Marie Davidson, The Bug, and Sherelle.

Band member Sebastian Szary released an album entitled "Datei" on June 28, 2024, which is a collection of abstract reworks of all ten tracks from MORE D4TA.

== Critical reception ==
Professional ratings
Aggregate scores
Source	Rating
Metacritic	78/100
Review scores
Source	Rating
AllMusic	3.5/5 stars
Beats Per Minute	80/100
The Line of Best Fit	8/10
musicOMH	4/5 stars

At Metacritic, which assigns a normalised rating out of 100 to reviews from mainstream publications, the album received an average score of 78 based on 4 reviews, indicating "generally favorable reviews".

== Track listing ==
No.	Title	Length
1.	"Fast Land"	3:39
2.	"Easy Prey"	4:26
3.	"Drum Glow"	4:44
4.	"Soft Edit"	1:24
5.	"Undo Redo"	4:38
6.	"Neon Rats"	7:30
7.	"More Love"	4:36
8.	"Numb Bell"	5:23
9.	"Doom Hype"	4:06
10.	"Copy Copy"	4:23
Total length:		44:49

== Charts ==
Chart (2022)	Peak position
Austrian Albums (Ö3 Austria)	26
Belgian Albums (Ultratop Flanders)	19
Belgian Albums (Ultratop Wallonia)	52
German Albums (Offizielle Top 100)	9
Swiss Albums (Schweizer Hitparade)	10
