= Happy Violentine =

Single by Miss Kittin

from the album I Com
- Released: 14 February 2005
- Genre: Electronica, electroclash
- Label: NovaMute
- Songwriters: Caroline Hervé, Thies Mynther, Tobias Neumann
- Producers: Thies Mynther, Tobias Neumann

Miss Kittin singles chronology
"Requiem for a Hit" (2004)	"Happy Violentine" (2005)	"Hometown / Dimanche" (2007)

Music video
- "Happy Violentine" on YouTube

"Happy Violentine" is the third single from Miss Kittin's first solo album I Com.

== Critical reception ==
Derek Miller of Pitchfork Media described the song "Happy Violentine" as "a love song pulled inside out, a track that seems pleased to display its visceral heartbreak".

== Music video ==
Laibach & Strup directed the animated music video for "Happy Violentine".

== Live performances ==
Miss Kittin performed "Happy Violentine (Mr. G Remix)" live at the Sónar festival and included it on her album Live at Sónar.

== Track listing ==
1. "Happy Violentine (Marco Passarani San Valentino Remix) -
2. "Happy Violentine (Mad Professor Smiling Orange Dub) -
3. "Happy Violentine (Michael Mayer Remix) -

== Charts ==
Chart (2005)	Peak Position
Belgian Dance Chart	9
UK Singles Chart	84
UK Dance Singles Chart	4
UK Indie Singles Chart	24
