= Moderat =

German electronic music supergroup

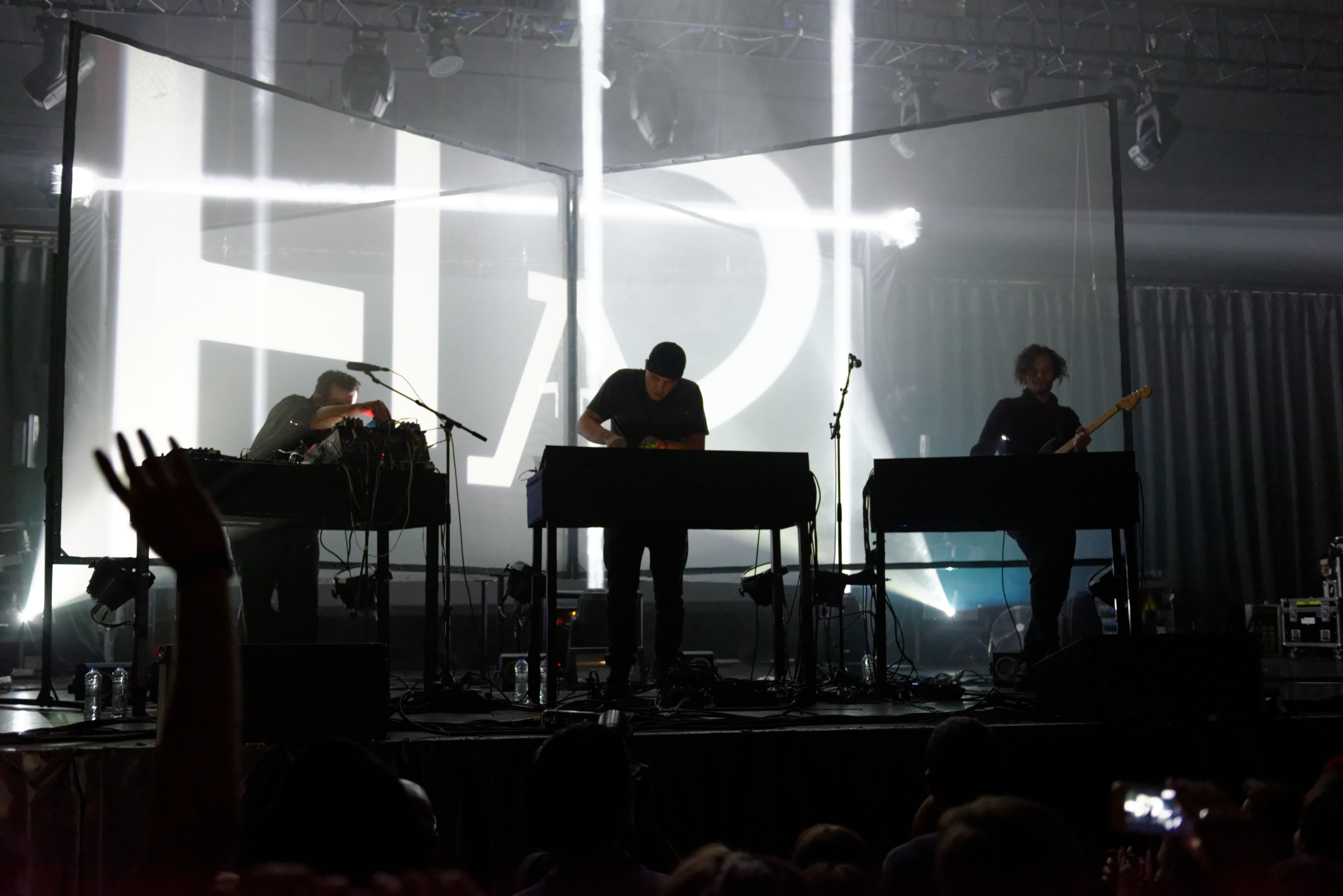
- NOS Primavera Sound, Barcelona, 2015

Background information
- Origin: Berlin, Germany
- Genres: Electronica; house; IDM; minimal techno
- Years active: 2002–2017, 2021–present
- Labels: BPitch Control, Monkeytown Records, Mute Records
- Members: Gernot Bronsert; Sascha Ring; Sebastian Szary
- Website: moderat.fm

Moderat is a German electronic music supergroup originating in Berlin between Sascha Ring, also known as Apparat, and Modeselektor members Gernot Bronsert and Sebastian Szary. The band has released four studio albums to date, their most recent being More D4ta, released on May 13, 2022. The group was voted "The #1 Live Act of the Year" in 2009 by the readers of Resident Advisor.

== History ==
Moderat's first release was an EP, Auf Kosten der Gesundheit ("At the Cost of Health") in 2003. Their first full-length album, Moderat, received mostly favorable reviews. NOW magazine gave the album 4 out of 5 points describing it as "quite creative and surprisingly catchy", and URB 5 out of 5, praising it for being "extremely beautiful and catchy".

In 2009, the readers of Resident Advisor, voted Moderat "The #1 Live Act Of The Year". In 2010, they were voted "The #7 Live Act" by the readers of the same website. Moderat toured Europe throughout the summer and autumn of 2010, playing mostly festivals.

Moderat's second album, II was released on August 2, 2013, digitally and August 6, 2013, physically through Monkeytown Records and Mute in the United States. The first video from II was "Bad Kingdom," an illustrated piece directed and produced by Pfadfinderei about a young British man in 1966 London traversing a greedy underworld.

On March 29, 2016, Moderat's third album III was released in Germany. A month before, a video to Reminder was released on YouTube.

In August 2017, Moderat announced they were taking an indefinite hiatus after their 2017 world tour ended in Berlin on 2 September 2017.

A minute of the song "The Mark (Interlude)" from the album II was used in the 2018 film Annihilation.

On 15 October 2021, Moderat teased a 2022 live show titled "MORE D4TA" on their Instagram page, indicating that the hiatus has come to an end.

In February 2022, a book on Modeselektor's album Happy Birthday! was published by Sean Nye for the 33 1/3 Europe series. A chapter focuses on the formation of Moderat.

On 9 February 2022, Moderat announced that their fourth studio album, More D4ta, would release on 13 May 2022 via Monkeytown Records. The first single from the album, "Fast Land", was premiered the next day, along with an accompanying music video. The second single, "Easy Prey", was released on 10 March 2022 along with a music video. On the same day, the track listing was released on iTunes. The album was released on 13 May 2022.

== Discography ==
=== Studio albums ===
- Moderat (2009)
- II (2013)
- III (2016)
- More D4ta (2022)

=== Extended plays ===
- Auf Kosten der Gesundheit (2003)

=== Live albums ===
- Live (2016)

=== Remix albums ===
- III (Remixes) (2016)
- EVEN MORE D4TA (2023)

=== Other albums ===
- III (Instrumentals) (2016)
- II (10th Anniversary Sped-up Edition) (2023)
