= Schaffel =

Music genre

- Stylistic origins: Minimal techno, rock
- Cultural origins: Late 1990s

Schaffel (the German spelling to match the English pronunciation of "shuffle") is a fusion style of techno and rock in which minimal techno's straight-up drum kick is shuffled to offbeat emphasis. Often triplet eighths are used to create swinging rhythms.

== History ==
Originating from swing and R&B roots, the beat was popularized by glam rock performers like T. Rex with their 1971 hit "Hot Love" and Gary Glitter in his 1972 hit "Rock and Roll Part 2".

The schaffel beat has remained in use in electronic music genres and can be found in such releases as "Personal Jesus" by Depeche Mode.

Michael Mayer's label Kompakt has put out a series of compilations titled Schaffelfieber ("Schaffel Fever").
