= Le Peuple de l'Herbe =

French electronic music band

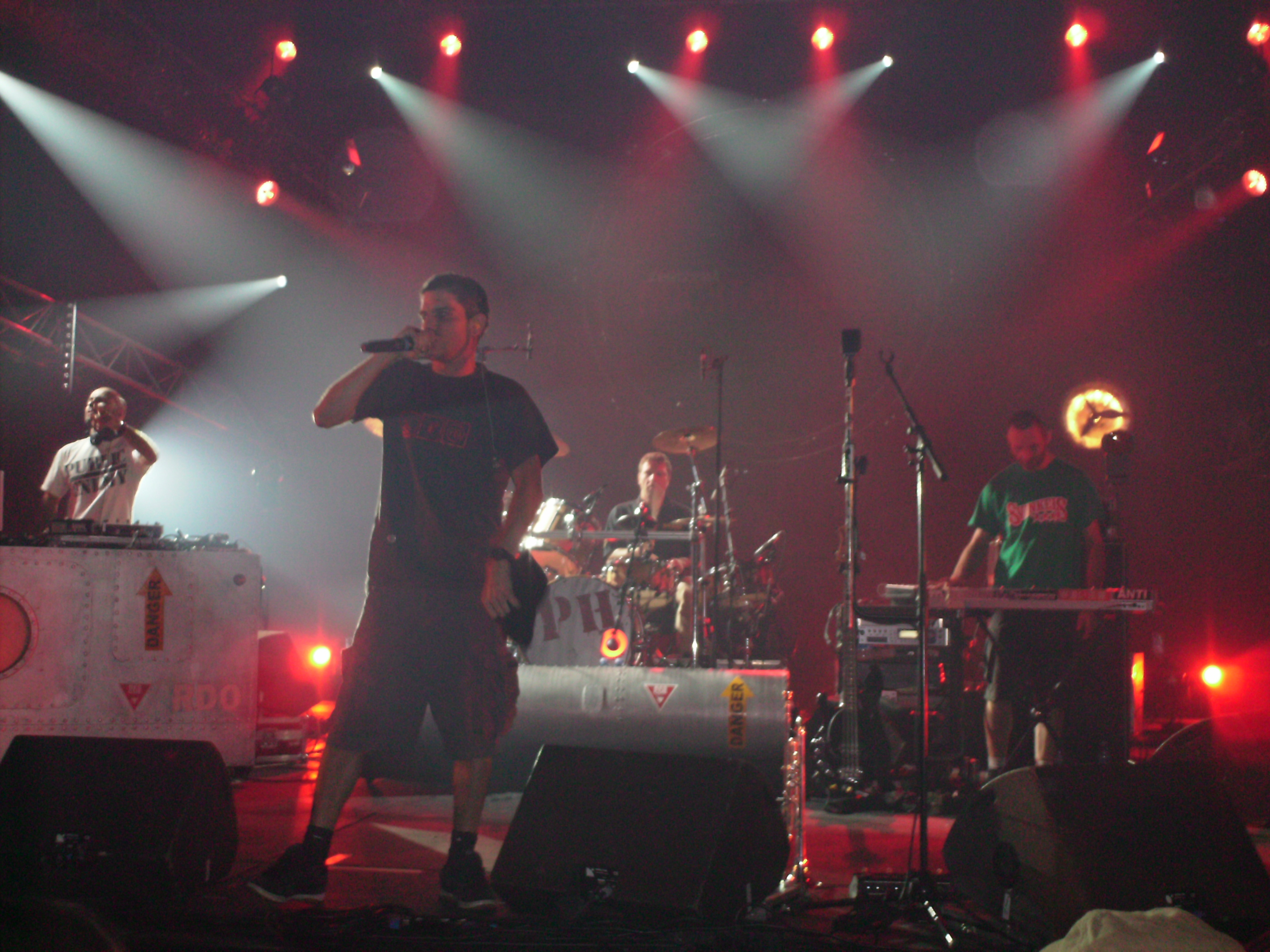
- Le Peuple de l'Herbe (Pee, Psychostick, Spagg & JC 001), live at Rocktambule festival in Grenoble, France 2007

Background information
- Origin: Lyon, France
- Genres: Electronic
- Years active: 1997–present
- Labels: PIAS, Discograph, Verychords

Le Peuple de l'Herbe is a French electronic music band formed in 1997 in Lyon.

Their music mixes hip-hop, acid jazz, nu jazz, dub, rock, and drum and bass.

In 2002, they were awarded "Group or Artist Stage Révélation of the Year" at the Victoires de la Musique.

As of 2019, they had released at least 10 albums.
