= Teki Latex =

French DJ (born 1978)

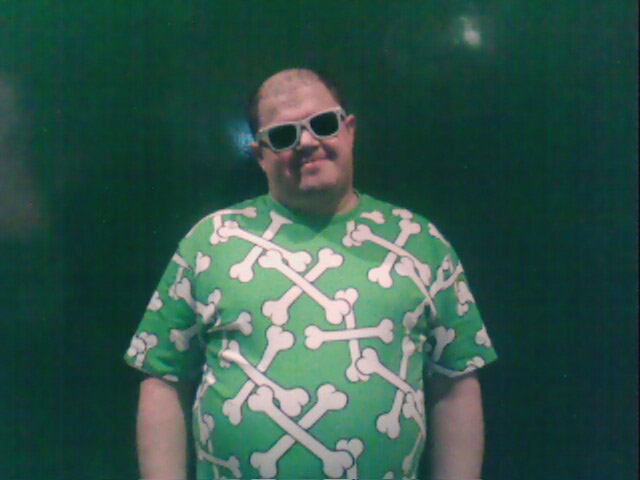
- Latex in Lille (2007)

Background information
- Born: Julien Pradeyrol; 1978 (age 47–48)
- Origin: Paris, France
- Genres: Pop; electro; hip hop; house; Bérite club
- Occupations: DJ; rapper; singer
- Years active: 1999–present

Julien Pradeyrol better known as Teki Latex (born 1978 in Paris, France) is a Paris-based disc jockey, rapper and singer, working both independently and as part of various formations, notably French hip-hop act TTC and in duo Sound Pellegrino Thermal Team with French producer Orgasmic. He runs the record label Sound Pellegrino. He was running a weekly DJ TV show called Overdrive Infinity that can be watched on Dailymotion. He then collaborated with Boiler Room and curated/presented a few shows for them. He is now fully dedicated to his DJ career and regularly plays big clubs in various cities like London, Berlin, Paris, etc...

== Life ==
He is also the co-founder of the independent hip-hop and electronica record label Institubes. He is of Italian descent. "Les matins de Paris", a single from his first solo album Party de plaisir, was recorded with Lio and peaked at number 14 in France.

== Discography ==
=== Albums ===
Album details	Peak positions
Album details	FR
Party de plaisir: Year released: 2007; Record label: EMI Music France	75
Mes pelures sont plus belles que vos fruits: Year released: June 2009; Record label: Institubes	–

=== Collaborations ===
- 2007: 33 Hz + Devin the Dude + Teki Latex: Paris, Texas (Remixes) (Dither Down)
- 2008: Orgasmic and Tekitek: The Sixpack Anthem (Maxi) (Institubes label)
- 2011: Sound Pellegrino Thermal Team: Bassface / Pretty Pretty Good EP (Remix) (Sound Pellegrino label)
- 2011: Birdy Nam Nam: Goin' in (Savoir Faire / SME France) later remixed by Skrillex and sampled by himself for A$AP Rocky: Goin Wild for the Night where Teki Latex vocals appears during chorus
- 2012: Para One: Every Little Thing Remixes (EP) (Marble/KSR)

=== Singles ===
Year	Single	Peak positions
Year	Single	FR
2007	"Les matins de Paris" (featuring Lio)	14
