= Shitkatapult =

Record label

- Founded: 1997
- Founder: Marco Haas
- Country of origin: Germany
- Location: Berlin
- Official website: www.shitkatapult.com

Shitkatapult is a German record label which focuses on electronic music, spanning both IDM and techno. The label was founded by Marco Haas (T. Raumschmiere) and Marcus Stotz in 1998, and is now run by Haas and Sascha Ring (Apparat).

Besides the work of T. Raumschmiere and Apparat, Shitkatapult has released music by Anders Ilar, Håkan Lidbo, Das Bierbeben and Fenin amongst others.
