= T. Raumschmiere =

German DJ and producer

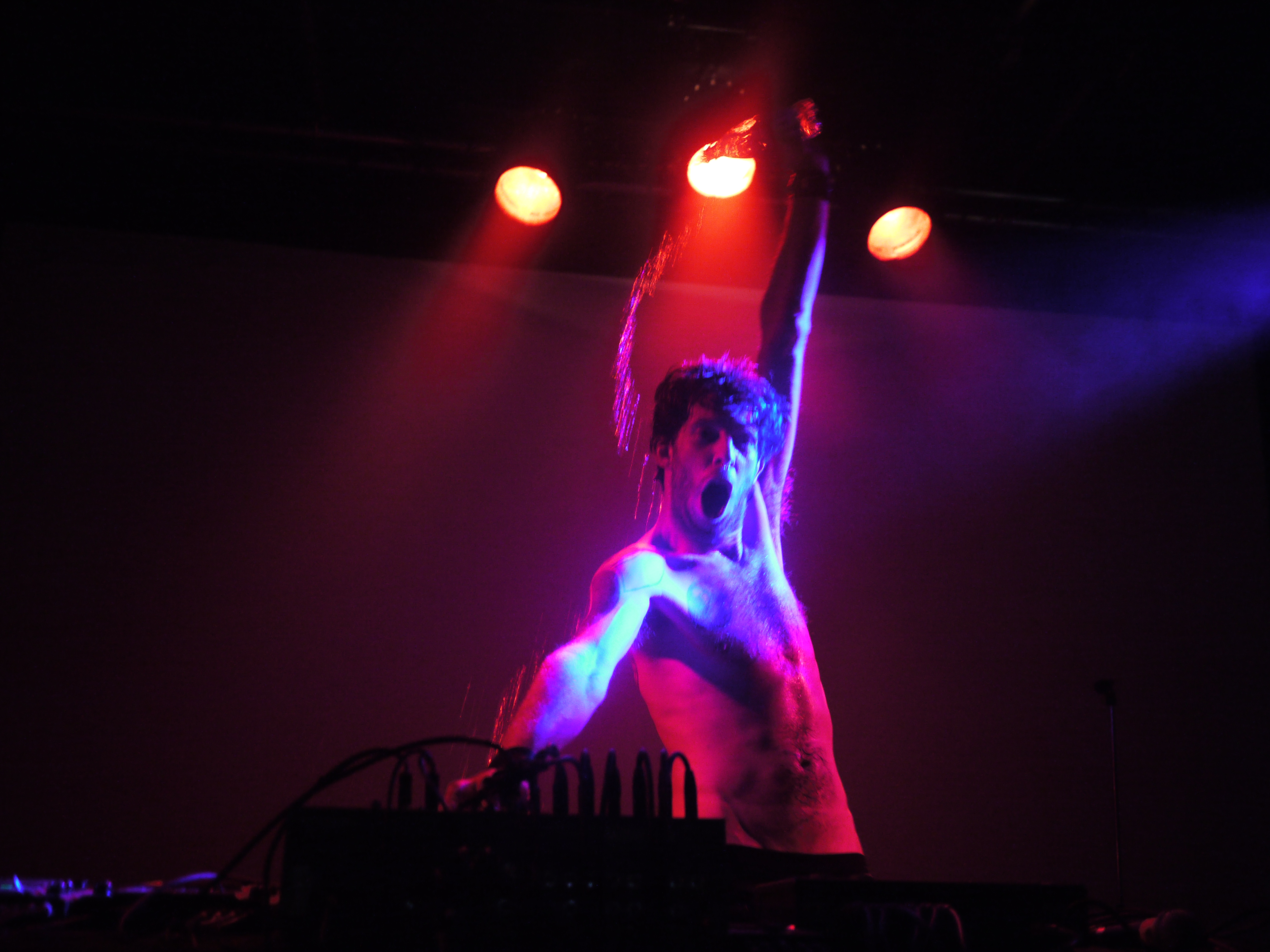
- T.Raumschmiere live in London (2011)

Background information
- Born: Marco Haas; 1975 (age 50–51)
- Origin: Heidelberg, Germany
- Genres: Electropop, techno, schaffel, dance-punk
- Occupations: DJ, producer
- Years active: 1997–present
- Label: Shitkatapult
- Website: t.raumschmiere.com

Marco Haas (born 1975) is a German punk/techno DJ known by the stage name T.Raumschmiere. He has released two albums of aggressive electropop and has worked with Miss Kittin and Ellen Allien, and helped found the Shitkatapult record label. He is also partly responsible for the mid-2000s resurgence of the schaffel beat.

== Career ==
In the early 1990s, Marco was the drummer for a hardcore punk group called Zorn, who performed at more than 300 shows around Europe, and released two albums on Maximum Voice Records (Leipzig). In 1997, his rock band Stormbow released their debut record, the first on Shitkatapult. Marco founded this now-famous label with Marcus Stotz in Heidelberg. At the same time, Marco was also working on a project called shrubbn!!, based on noise improvisation, together with Ulli Bomans. In the same year, Marco got his solo moniker for electronic music: T.Raumschmiere. In 1998, Marco moved to Berlin. The first tracks under the name "T. Raumschmiere" were released on the compilation series Cozmick Suckers, also on Shitkatapult. Around this time, he began work on a stage project called Pop Poisoned Poetry featuring Miss Tigra, and started a monthly event called Erlösung Durch Strom (salvation through electricity).

In 2000, the first T. Raumschmiere records were released. These records gave him the title of King of Gnarz (gnarz is a German expression for the sound of a record's endless loop). The first releases were based almost completely on samples of these sounds, tuned up or down to get bass or treble. He also started drumming again, with his punk rock band Mos Eisley Rock. In 2001, Raumschmiere played more than 150 live and DJ gigs all over the world. In 2002, Shitkatapult bundled together the best of T.Raumschmiere's Greatest Gnarz Hits on the Great Rock 'n' Roll Swindle. A little later, the album Anti was released by Hefty Records. Marco had also been working on new songs with his band Mos Eisley Rock, a few of which have appeared on different compilations. In 2003, T.Raumschmiere was listed as Best Live Act and Shitkatapult as Best Label in several Reader Poll Top 10s. He was offered a record deal on novamute. The first single to be released was "Monstertruckdriver" with "The Game Is Not Over" (featuring Miss Kittin). The debut album, Radio Blackout, followed. In 2004, more remixes followed, including one for his American friend Quasimodo Jones. After touring continuously since 2003, T.Raumschmiere tried something new. He enlisted drummer Dirk Mielenhausen and bass player Andreas Paruschke, along with sound engineer Allert Aalders, as his stage cover band for all live concerts and started to sing. The T.Raumschmiere band toured all over Europe, playing festivals in Belgium, the Netherlands, Spain and Germany. In 2005, the brand new album Blitzkrieg Pop was released on novamute.

After a hiatus, in October 2006, T.Raumschmiere released the track "Die alte Leier" that had been produced in 1996 in Heidelberg with Alex Cortex. After the 2005 album "Blitzkrieg Pop" and the 2006 release "Random Noize Sessions, Vol. 1", T.Raumschmiere is finally releasing his next album: "I Tank U" in 2008.

In December 2009 T. Raumschmiere did the famous bottle of Held Vodka interview with proud magazine, a berlin based music, fashion and lifestyle magazine.

== Name ==
The name T.Raumschmiere is a cut-up from the German title of the short story "The Dream Cops" by William S. Burroughs: "Die Traumschmiere".

The German title contains several different meanings:

- TRAUM = dream, subconscious
- RAUM = room, space, venue
- SCHMIERE = grease, lubricant, smear, spread

== Influences ==
T.Raumschmiere has mentioned Nine Inch Nails, Big Black, Coil, Throbbing Gristle, The Misfits, RKL, Esplendor Geometrico, Deutsch Nepal, Helmet, Shellac, Dead Kennedys, Black Flag, Biosphere, Aphex Twin, Tool, NON, Radiohead, The Jesus Lizard, Motörhead, Nomeansno, The Dillinger Escape Plan, and Unsane as inspirational.

== Discography ==
=== Albums ===
- 2002: Anti
- 2002: The Great Rock 'n' Roll Swindle
- 2003: Radio Blackout
- 2005: Blitzkrieg Pop
- 2006: Random Noize Sessions, Vol. 1
- 2008: I Tank U
- 2015: T.Raumschmiere
- 2017: Heimat

=== Singles ===
- 2003: "Monstertruckdriver"
- 2003: "Rabaukendisko"
- 2004: "A Million Brothers"
- 2005: "Sick like Me"
- 2005: "Blitzkrieg Pop"
- 2005: "A Very Loud Lullaby" (feat. Sandra Nasić)
- 2006: "Die Alte Leier"
- 2008: "E"
- 2008: "Animal Territory/Brenner"

== See also ==
- Schaffel music
