= Orgasmic (producer) =

French DJ (born 1978)

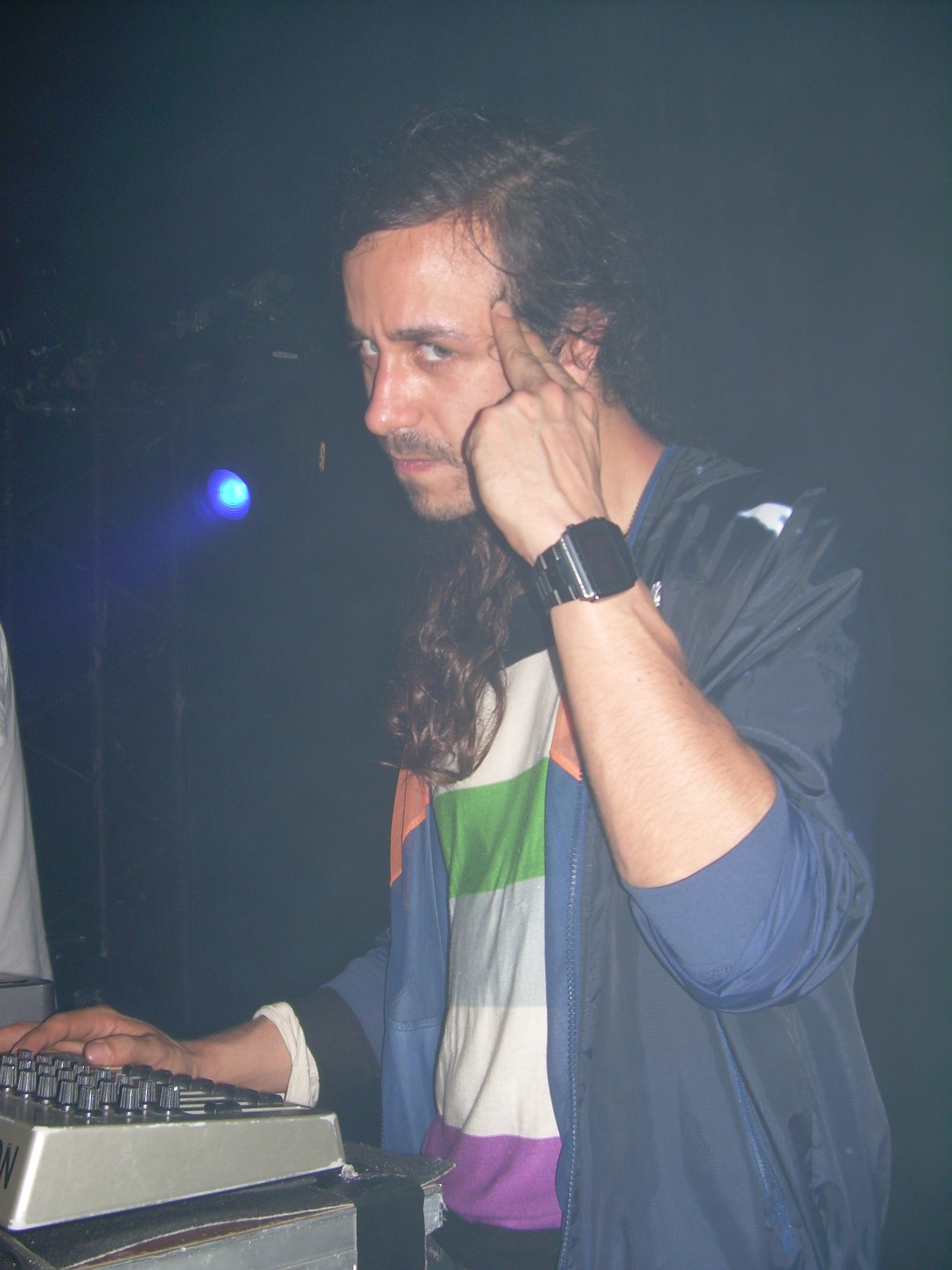
- Orgasmic in concert (2007)

Background information
- Also known as: DJ Orgasmic le Toxicologue
- Born: Cédric Caillol; 1978 (44-45)
- Origin: Versailles, France
- Genres: rap, Electro, hip hop
- Occupation: DJ / Music producer
- Years active: 2000-present
- Member of: Sound Pellegrino Thermal; TTC; Cuizinier
- Formerly of: Fuzati; Orgasmic and Fusati

Cédric Caillol better known by his stage name Orgasmic (born 1978) is a French DJ and music producer of rap and electro music originating from Versailles, France.

== Career ==
In 2000 and 2001, Orgasmic started as a DJ / producer for Klub des Loosers, a musical project of Versaille-based rapper, actor, author and singer Fuzati where he was known as DJ Orgasmic le Toxicologue . After Orgasmic left, Fuzati continued with the project with DJ Detect starting 2001.

In 2002, he released his first mixtape titled Orgasmic le Toxicologue est secretement amoureux de vous where he mixed songs from various artists including Marilyn Manson, Britney Spears, D12 and Busdriver. 2006 saw his first mixtape with Institubes, titled The Rise and Rise of Orgasmic, containing exclusive tracks from Cuizinier, Charly Greane, Para One, Feadz, Omnikrom, Institubes Paris Terror Club etc. He was very much involved with Stunts, being the rap section of the label Institubes.

After leaving Klub des Loosers, he joined as DJ and producer of TTC, a French rap band project started by Teki Latex (real name Julien Pradeyrol) and Bladazz (real name Tido Berman) alongside Cuizinier, Tekitek's cousin joining in. After appearing on several mixtapes, TTC released their debut album Ceci n'est pas un disque on Big Dada Recordings. The 2005 Bâtards Sensibles was a big turning point for TTC and they were signed to French V2 label with Orgasmic as producer.

Orgasmic's long collaboration with Cuizinier of TTC resulted in a series of releases Pour Les Filles in three volumes. Orgasmic was also a member of other groups, like in SuperFamilleConne for example.

Orgasmic cofounded the label Sound Pellegrino and pursued a side project with TTC member Tekitek in the duo Sound Pellegrino Thermal. They gained fame with "Bassface (Remixes)" in 2011 and cooperated with Modeselektor in releasing the single "Negativity" in 2013.

=== Orgasmic and Fuzati ===
Orgasmic and Fuzati of Klub des Loosers fame cooperated once again in 2013-2014 jointly releasing the album Grand siècle credited to "Orgasmic and Fuzati". The album was released on 21 April 2014 on Les disques du manoir label with "Planetarium" as the debut single from the album.

== Discography ==
=== Mixtapes ===
- 2002: Orgasmic le toxicologue est secrètement amoureux de vous (self-financed)
- 2006: Alors les filles on fête Nöel (Institubes label)
- 2006: The Rise and Rise of Orgasmic (Institubes label)

=== Production ===
- 2005: Pour Les Filles Vol. 1 (Disque Primeur)
- 2006: Pour Les Filles Vol. 2 (Institubes)
- 2008: Pour Les Filles Vol. 3 (Institubes)

=== as TTC ===
- 2006: 3615 TTC (V2 Music France)
- 2006: Téléphone / Paris-Paris (V2 Music France)

=== as Orgasmic and Tekitek ===
- 2008: The Sixpack Anthem (Maxi) (Institubes label)

=== as Sound Pellegrino Thermal Team ===
(duo with Tekitek or Tekilatex)

- 2011: Bassface / Pretty Pretty Good EP (Remix) (Sound Pellegrino label)

=== as Orgasmic and Fuzati ===
Year	Album	Peak positions	
Year	Album	FR	BEL (Wa)
2014	Grand siècle	69	83
