= TTC (band) =

French hip hop duo (1998–2013)

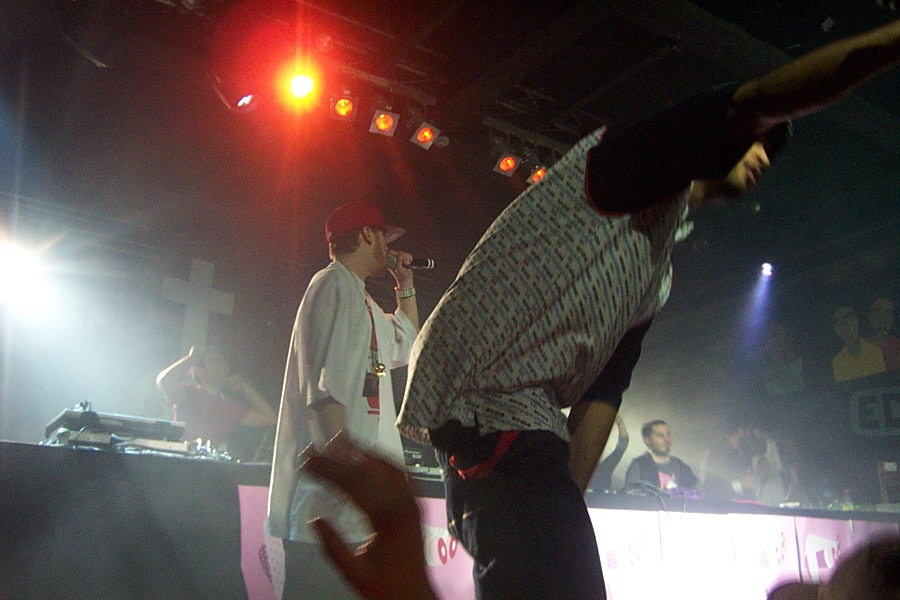
- TTC performing live in Paris, 2001.

Background information
- Origin: Paris, France
- Genre: Hip-hop
- Years active: 1998–2013
- Label: Big Dada
- Past members: Tido Berman; Teki Latex; Cuizinier; Orgasmic; Para One; Tacteel

TTC were a French hip-hop group from Paris. It consists of Tido Berman, Teki Latex, Cuizinier, Orgasmic, Para One, and Tacteel. In 2007, Les Inrockuptibles described it as "one of the most fascinating developments in French music of the past ten years."

== History ==
In 2002, TTC released the first album, Ceci N'est Pas Un Disque, on Big Dada. In 2004, the group released the second album, Batards Sensibles. It featured vocal contributions from Busdriver and Radioinactive. The third and final album, 3615 TTC, was released in 2006.

== Members ==
- Tido Berman - vocals
- Teki Latex - vocals
- Cuizinier - vocals
- Orgasmic - DJ
- Para One - production
- Tacteel - production

== Discography ==
=== Studio albums ===
- Ceci N'est Pas Un Disque (2002)
- Batards Sensibles (2004)
- 3615 TTC (2006)

=== EPs ===
- Elementaire (2001)
- Danser (2002)
- Trop Singe (2003)
- Girlfriend (2006)

=== Singles ===
- "Game Over 99" b/w "Trop Frias" (1999)
- "Leguman" b/w "Subway" (2000)
- "De Pauvres Riches" (2003)
- "Dans Le Club" (2004)
- "Telephone" b/w "Paris, Paris" (2006)
- "Travailler" (2007)

=== Guest appearances ===
- DJ Vadim - "L'art D'ecouter" from U.S.S.R. The Art of Listening (2002)
- Para One - "Beat Down" from Beat Down EP (2003)
- Stacs of Stamina - "Donne Moi Un Poisson" from Tivoli (2005)
- Modeselektor - "Dancingbox" from Hello Mom! (2005)
- Daedelus - "Cadavre Exquis" from Exquisite Corpse (2005)
- Kid Rolex - "Trop in Love" (2006)
- Para One - "Musclor" from Epiphanie (2006)
- dDamage - "Feed the Fish" from Shimmy Shimmy Blade (2006)
- Mr. Flash – "Champions" (2006)
- Ghislain Poirier - "Pour Te Rechaufffer" from Rebondir EP (2006)
- Radioclit - "Mature Macho Machine" (2006)
- Modeselektor - "2000007" from Happy Birthday! (2007)
- Edit - "Crunk De Gaulle" from Certified Air Raid Material (2007)
