= Otto von Schirach =

American musician

- Born: March 10, 1978 (age 48); Miami, Florida, United States
- Genres: IDM; breakcore
- Years active: 2001-present
- Labels: Schematic Records, Monkeytown Records

Otto von Schirach (born March 10, 1978, in Miami, Florida) is an American IDM and breakcore musician. Of Cuban and German heritage, he grew up in the Little Havana neighborhood of Miami and heavily incorporates elements of Miami bass into his music. He started out DJing at house parties in the 1990s and began composing his own music. In 2001 he released his first album, 8000 B.C., on his own Triangle Earth label.

Von Schirach has a son who was born in 2016.

== Discography ==
=== Albums ===
- 2001: 8000 B.C. (Triangle Earth/Schematic)
- 2001: Escalo Frio (Schematic)
- 2004: Global Speaker Fisting (Schematic)
- 2006: Maxipad Detention (Ipecac Recordings)
- 2006: Pimps of Gore (collaborative album with Gut) (Supreme Chaos, 2006)
- 2007: Spine Serpents From Sperm Island (Palm Tree Snuff & Santa Barbara Records)
- 2008: Oozing Bass Spasms (Cock Rock Disco)
- 2009: Magic Triangle
- 2012: Supermeng (Monkeytown)

=== Singles and EPs ===
- 2002: Boombonic Plague (Schematic)
- 2002: Chopped Zombie Fungus Vol 2 Pelican Moondance (Schematic)
- 2003: Sduisant Lollipop / Swimming Is Great If You Aren't Drowning (Imputor?)
- 2003: El Golpe Avisa (Rice And Beans)
- 2006: Pukology (Imputor?)
- 2009: Bass Low / Bass Galactica 8 (Basshead)
- 2018: Draculo (Monkeytown)
- 2021: Ottobrus (with Qebrus) (Triangle Earth)
