= Modeselektor =

German electronic music duo

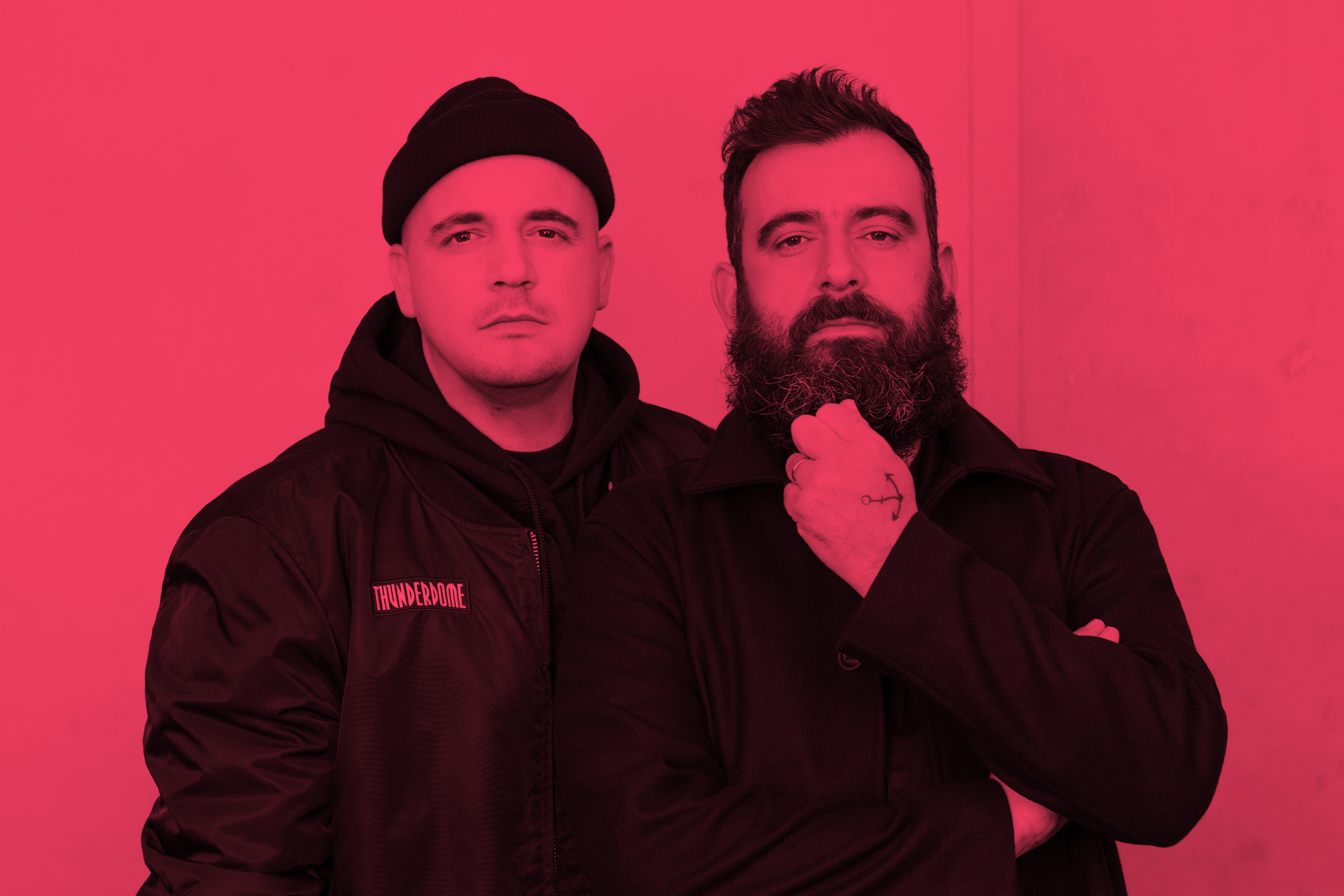
- Modeselektor in 2018

Background information
- Origin: Berlin, Germany
- Genres: Electronic; IDM
- Years active: 1996–present
- Labels: Monkeytown; BPitch Control
- Members: Gernot Bronsert; Sebastian Szary
- Website: www.modeselektor.com

Modeselektor is a German electronic music duo consisting of Gernot Bronsert and Sebastian Szary. They have collaborated with acts including Thom Yorke, Otto von Schirach, Siriusmo, Paul St. Hilaire, TTC, Puppetmastaz and Maxïmo Park. They have released several albums in collaboration with the German musician Apparat under the name Moderat.

== History ==
Bronsert and Szary members met in 1992 in Berlin, when Szary was performing live acid house music at illegal underground parties under the moniker Fundamental Knowledge. The group says, "After the Wall came down, everywhere in Germany and especially East Germany there was a lot of chaos, anarchy." They soon began creating music as Modeselektor, a name taken from a function on the Roland Space Echo effects unit.

In 1999, Modeselektor signed their first remix contract and began working with Pfadfinderei, a Berlin-based VJ and design collective. In 2000, Modeselektor met Ellen Allien, making BPitch Control their home label. In 2002, Modeselektor and Apparat formed the supergroup Moderat; in 2003, they released their first EP, followed by four full-length albums between 2009 and 2022. Modeselektor also has collaborations with Pfadfinderei as Pfadselektor, and with Rhythm & Sound's Paul St. Hillaire. They have produced sound installations at the Centre Pompidou in Paris and lectured at the Merz Akademie in Stuttgart. Modeselektor is a favourite group of Radiohead's singer, Thom Yorke.

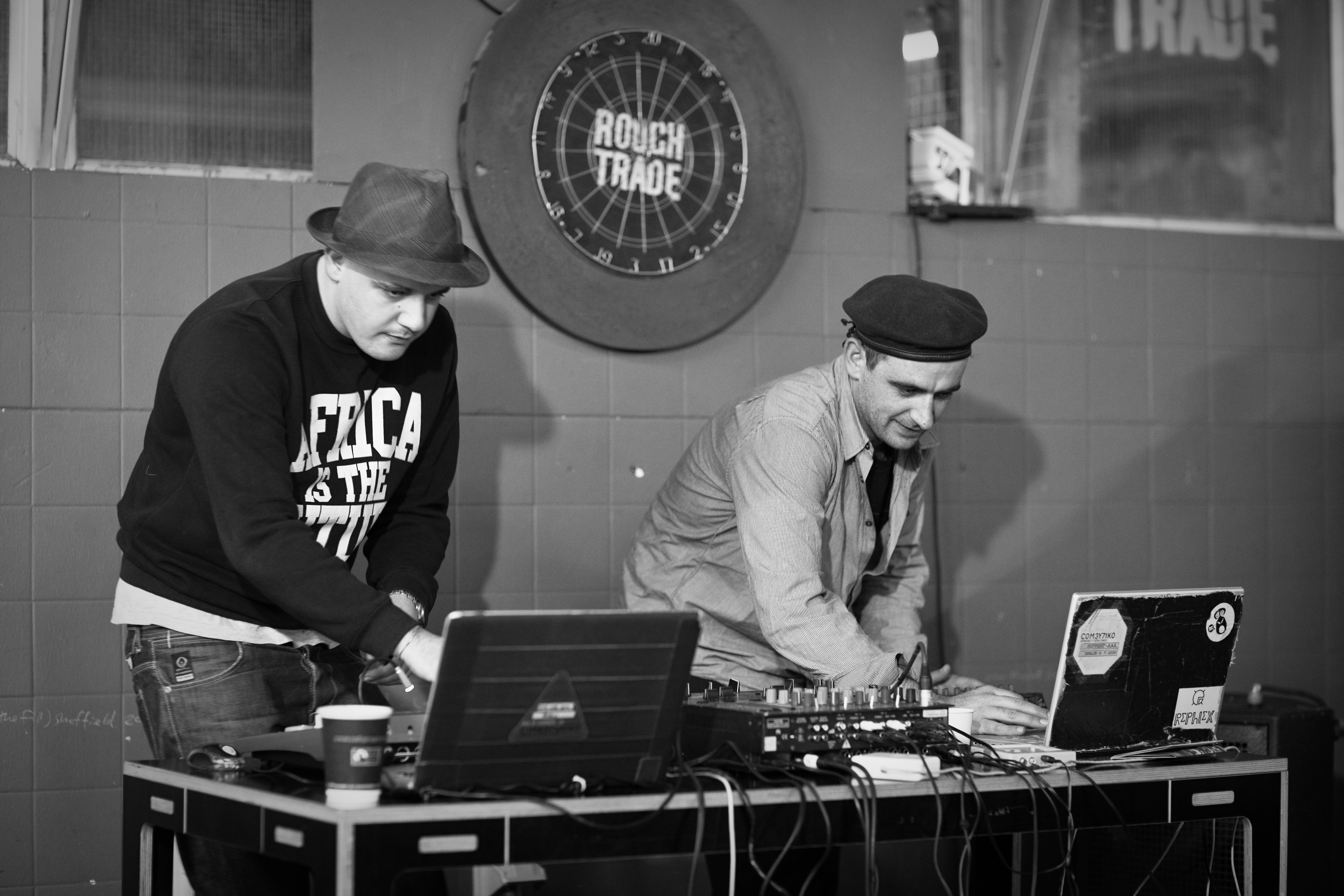
Modeselektor in 2009

Their first album, Hello Mom! (2005), was followed by Happy Birthday! (2007), with Yorke, Paul St. Hilaire, TTC, Puppetmastaz and Maxïmo Park as guest vocalists. Other collaborators included Otto von Schirach, Siriusmo, and Apparat. In an interview that same year, the group said regarding their sound: "Happy metal, hard rap, country-ambient, Russian crunk. We don't like it if people tag us as being a certain style or school or scene or whatever. We don't really care about all that."

Modeselektor also appeared as the main characters in Amy Grill's 2009 electronic music documentary, Speaking in Code. Modeselektor are said to be good friends with Siriusmo, and regularly remix and promote his material. In September 2011, Modeselektor released their third LP, Monkeytown, featuring contributions from artists including Yorke.

In 2013, Modeselektor's label Monkeytown Records and Telekom Electronic Beats produced the documentary "We Are Modeselektor". In April 2021, Modeselektor released their fourth LP, Extended. In February 2022, a book on Modeselektor's album Happy Birthday! was published by Sean Nye for the 33 1/3 Europe series.

== Monkeytown Records ==
Monkeytown Records is a Berlin-based electronic music record label, owned by Modeselektor. The label has released music by Modeselektor, Moderat, WK7, Mouse on Mars, Otto von Schirach, Siriusmo, and Funkstörung, among others.

== Awards and nominations ==
Award	Year	Nominee(s)	Category	Result	Ref.
Echo Music Prize	2012	Monkeytown	Critics' Prize	Won	

== Discography ==
=== Studio albums ===
- Hello Mom! (BPitch Control, 2005)
- Happy Birthday! (BPitch Control, 2007)
- Monkeytown (Monkeytown Records, 2011)
- Who Else (Monkeytown Records, 2019)
- Extended (Monkeytown Records, 2021)
- Mean Friend (Monkeytown Records, 2021)
- EXTLP (Monkeytown Records, 2021)
- Missed Opportunities (Monkeytown Records, 2021)
- Extended Chords (Monkeytown Records, 2021)
- DJ-Kicks (2025)

=== Compilations ===
- Modeselektion Vol. 01 (2010)
- Modeselektion Vol. 02 (2012)
- Modeselektion Vol. 03 (2014)
- Modeselektion Vol. 04 (2018)
- Classics Vol. 1 (2026)

=== DJ mixes ===
- Boogybytes Vol. 3 - Mixed by Modeselektor (BPitch Control, 2007)
- Body Language Vol. 8 (Get Physical Music, 2009)
- DJ-Kicks: Modeselektor (!K7 Music, 2025)

=== Multimedia ===
- Labland (Dalbin, 2005) with Pfadfinderei, DVD
- Mdslktr (BPitch Control, 2005), DVD + CD Box Set

=== Extended plays ===
- Death Medley (BPitch Control, 2002)
- In Loving Memory (BPitch Control, 2002)
- Ganes De Frau Vol. 1 (BPitch Control, 2003)
- Turn Deaf! (BPitch Control, 2004)
- Hello Mom! The Remixes (BPitch Control, 2006)
- Happy Birthday! Remixes #1 (BPitch Control, 2008)
- Happy Birthday! Remixes #2 (BPitch Control, 2008)
- Happy Birthday! Remixes #3 (BPitch Control, 2009)

=== Singles ===
- "Weed wid da Macka" (Shockout, 2006)
- "The Dark Side of the Sun" (BPitch Control, 2007) with Puppetmastaz
- "Art & Cash" (Get Physical Music, 2009)
- "Shipwreck" with Thom Yorke (Monkeytown Records, 2011)
- "Evil Twin" featuring Otto von Schirach (Monkeytown Records, 2012)
- "This" with Thom Yorke (Monkeytown Records, 2012)
- "Silikon" featuring Sasha Perrera (FIFA 08 soundtrack)
- "Trees" / "50 Trees" with Paul St. Hilaire (50weapons)
- "Kalif Storch" (2018)
- "Wealth" featuring Flohio (Monkeytown Records, 2018)
- "I Am Your God" / "Bronko" (Monkeytown Records, 2019)
- "Who" featuring Tommy Cash (Monkeytown Records, 2019)

=== Remixes ===
- Miss Kittin - "Professional Distortion (Modeselektor's Big Muff Mix)"
- Thom Yorke - Skip Divided (Modeselektor Remix)
- Björk - Dull Flame Of Desire (Modeselektor's Rmx for Girls)
- Björk - Dull Flame Of Desire (Modeselektor's Rmx for Boys)
- Boys Noize - Jeffer (Modeselektor Remix)
- Bonaparte - Computer in Love (Modeselektor Remix)
- Roots Manuva - Witness (Modeselektor's Troublemaker Remix)
- Headhunter - Prototype (Modeselektor Remix) [TEMP046]
- Radiohead - Good Evening Mrs Magpie Rmx
- Trentemøller - Tide (Modeselektor's Last Remix Ever)
- Apparat - Holdon (Modeselektor Remix)

=== Production ===
- TTC - Une bande de mecs sympas (3615 TTC, 2007)
- Fettes Brot - Bettina, zieh dir bitte etwas an! (Strom und Drang, 2008)
- Bonaparte - Orangutang (My Horse Likes You, 2010)

=== With Moderat ===
- Auf Kosten der Gesundheit (EP, BPitch Control, 2003)
- Moderat (BPitch Control, 2009)
- II (Monkeytown Records, 2013)
- III (Monkeytown Records, 2016)
- More D4ta (Monkeytown Records. 2022)
