= Miss Kittin discography =

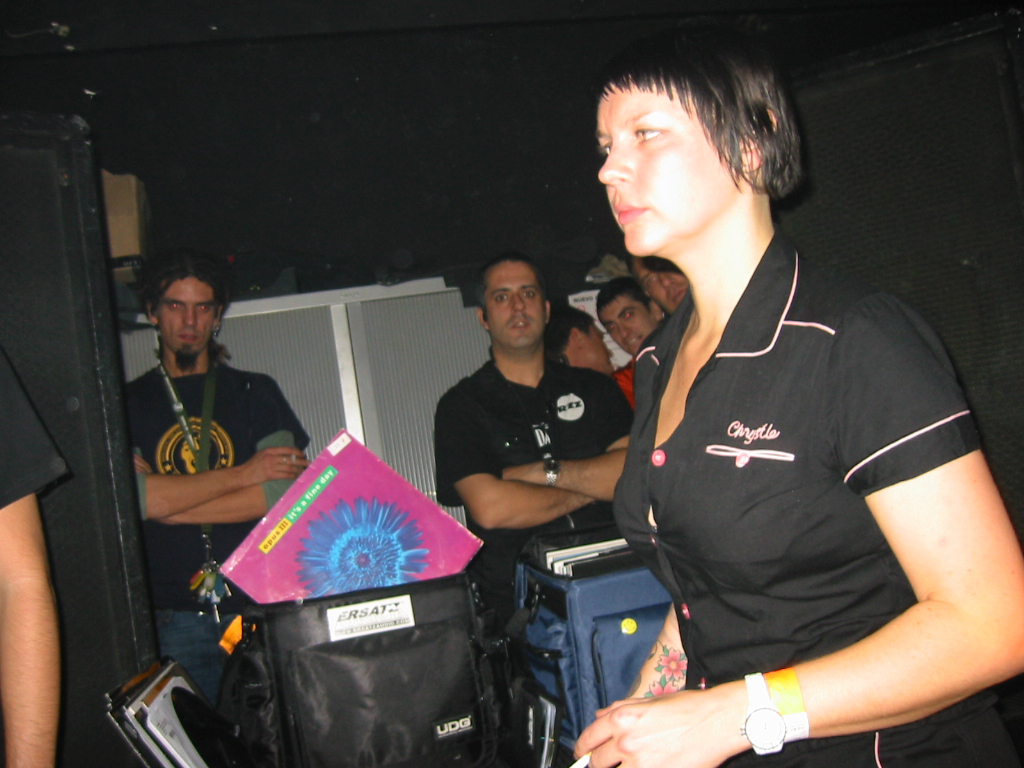
- Miss Kittin in 2004
- Studio albums: 8
- Extended plays: 7
- Live albums: 1
- Compilation albums: 3
- Singles: 37

French singer and DJ Miss Kittin has released seven studio albums, one live album, three compilation albums, seven extended plays (EPs), and thirty-seven singles (including thirteen as a featured artist).

== Albums ==
=== Studio albums ===
List of studio albums, with selected chart positions
| Title | Details | Peak chart positions | | | | | | | |
| Title | Details | FRA | BEL (FL) | BEL (WA) | GER | NLD | SWI | UK | US Dance |
|---|---|---|---|---|---|---|---|---|---|
| Or (with Golden Boy) | Released: 13 August 2001; Label: Ladomat 2000; Formats: CD, LP, digital download | — | — | — | — | — | — | — | — |
| First Album (with The Hacker) | Released: October 2001; Label: International DeeJay Gigolo; Formats: CD, LP, digital download | — | — | — | — | — | — | — | — |
| I Com | Released: 31 May 2004; Label: NovaMute; Formats: CD, LP, digital download | 56 | 79 | 77 | 100 | 82 | 82 | 171 | 13 |
| BatBox | Released: 4 February 2008; Label: Nobody's Bizzness; Formats: CD, LP, digital download | 75 | 91 | 84 | — | — | — | — | — |
| Two (with The Hacker) | Released: 12 March 2009; Label: Nobody's Bizzness; Formats: CD, LP, digital download | 102 | — | 87 | — | — | — | — | — |
| Calling from the Stars | Released: 19 April 2013; Label: Nobody's Bizzness, wSphere; Formats: CD, LP, digital download | 98 | 78 | 50 | — | — | — | — | — |
| Cosmos (as Kittin) | Released: 2 November 2018; Label: Nobody's Bizzness; Formats: LP, digital download | — | — | — | — | — | — | — | — |
"—" denotes a recording that did not chart or was not released in that territory.

=== Live albums ===
List of live albums, with selected chart positions
| Title | Details | Peak chart positions |
| Title | Details | FRA |
|---|---|---|
| Live at Sónar | Released: 16 January 2006; Label: Labels, NovaMute; Format: CD | 136 |

=== Compilation albums ===
List of compilation albums, with selected chart positions
| Title | Details | Peak chart positions |
| Title | Details | FRA |
|---|---|---|
| On the Road | Released: 12 February 2002; Label: Terminal M; Format: CD | — |
| Radio Caroline Volume 1 | Released: 11 December 2002; Label: Labels; Format: CD | 134 |
| A Bugged Out Mix | Released: 17 April 2006; Label: Resist Music; Formats: CD, LP, digital download | 170 |
"—" denotes a recording that did not chart or was not released in that territory.

== Extended plays ==
| Title | Details |
|---|---|
| Champagne (with The Hacker) | Released: 6 June 1998; Label: International DeeJay Gigolo; Format: 12-inch vinyl |
| Intimités (with The Hacker) | Released: 14 May 1999; Label: International DeeJay Gigolo; Format: 12-inch vinyl |
| Mixing Me | Released: 19 April 2005; Label: Labels; Format: CD |
| Where Is Kittin? (with Marc Houle) | Released: 24 May 2013; Label: Items & Things; Formats: 12-inch vinyl, digital download |
| June (with Nicolas Masseyeff) | Released: 16 June 2015; Label: Mobilee; Format: Digital download |
| Lost Tracks Vol. 1 (with The Hacker) | Released: 14 August 2015; Label: Nobody's Bizzness; Formats: 12-inch vinyl, digital download |
| Lost Tracks Vol. 2 (with The Hacker) | Released: 22 June 2018; Label: Nobody's Bizzness; Formats: 12-inch vinyl, digital download |

== Singles ==
=== As lead artist ===
List of singles as lead artist, with selected chart positions, showing year released and album name
| Title | Year | Peak chart positions | | | | | | Album |
| Title | Year | FRA | BEL (FL) | BEL (WA) | GER | SPA | UK | Album |
|---|---|---|---|---|---|---|---|---|
| "1982" (with The Hacker) | 1998 | — | — | — | — | — | — | First Album |
| "Frank Sinatra" (with The Hacker) | 1998 | — | — | — | — | — | — | First Album |
| "Rippin Kittin" (with Golden Boy) | 2002 | — | 65 | 58 | 95 | 11 | 67 | Or |
| "Autopilot" (with Golden Boy) | 2003 | — | — | — | — | — | — | Or |
| "Stock Exchange" (with The Hacker) | 2003 | — | — | — | — | — | 118 | First Album |
| "The Beach" (with The Hacker) | 2003 | — | — | — | — | — | — | First Album |
| "Professional Distortion" | 2004 | 77 | — | — | — | — | 83 | I Com |
| "Requiem for a Hit" | 2004 | — | — | — | — | — | 92 | I Com |
| "Happy Violentine" | 2005 | — | — | — | — | — | 84 | I Com |
| "Hometown"/"Dimanche" (with The Hacker) | 2007 | — | — | — | — | — | — | Non-album single |
| "Kittin Is High" | 2007 | — | — | — | — | — | — | BatBox |
| "Grace" | 2008 | — | — | — | — | — | — | BatBox |
| "PPPO" (with The Hacker) | 2009 | — | — | — | — | — | — | Two |
| "1000 Dreams" (with The Hacker) | 2009 | — | 70 | — | — | — | — | Two |
| "Party in My Head" (with The Hacker) | 2009 | — | — | — | — | — | — | Two |
| "All You Need" | 2011 | — | — | — | — | — | — | Non-album single |
| "Life Is My Teacher" | 2012 | — | — | — | — | — | — | Calling from the Stars |
| "Bassline"/"Come into My House" | 2013 | — | — | — | — | — | — | Calling from the Stars |
| "What to Wear" | 2013 | — | — | — | — | — | — | Calling from the Stars |
| "Maneki Neko" | 2013 | — | — | — | — | — | — | Calling from the Stars |
| "Rumors on the Dancefloor" (with Guy Gerber) | 2015 | — | — | — | — | — | — | Non-album singles |
| "Ride" (with Dubfire) | 2016 | — | — | — | — | — | — | Non-album singles |
| "1993 EACID" | 2018 | — | — | — | — | — | — | Non-album singles |
| "Forever Ravers" (with Anna) | 2019 | — | — | — | — | — | — | Non-album singles |
| "Silver Screen (Shower Screen)" (with David Guetta and Felix da Housecat) | 2022 | — | — | — | — | — | — | Non-album singles |
"—" denotes a recording that did not chart or was not released in that territory.

=== As featured artist ===
List of singles as featured artist, with selected chart positions, showing year released and album name
| Title | Year | Peak chart positions | | | | | | | Album |
| Title | Year | FRA | BEL (FL) | BEL (WA) | CAN | NLD | UK | US DSS | Album |
|---|---|---|---|---|---|---|---|---|---|
| "The Vogue" (Antonelli Electr. featuring Miss Kittin) | 2000 | — | — | — | — | — | — | — | Non-album single |
| "Silver Screen Shower Scene" (Felix da Housecat featuring Miss Kittin) | 2001 | 86 | 34 | 48 | — | 94 | 39 | — | Kittenz and Thee Glitz |
| "What Does It Feel Like?" (Felix da Housecat featuring Miss Kittin and Melistar) | 2001 | — | — | — | — | — | 66 | — | Kittenz and Thee Glitz |
| "Je t'aime... moi non plus" (Sven Väth featuring Miss Kittin) | 2001 | — | — | — | — | — | — | — | Fire |
| "Madame Hollywood" (Felix da Housecat featuring Miss Kittin) | 2002 | — | — | — | 19 | — | — | 11 | Kittenz and Thee Glitz |
| "My Voice..." (Berkovi vs. Miss Kittin) | 2002 | — | — | — | — | — | — | — | Non-album single |
| "Le Flaneur" (Estroe featuring Miss Kittin) | 2009 | — | — | — | — | — | — | — | Elemental Assets |
| "Housewife" (Oxia featuring Miss Kittin) | 2012 | — | — | — | — | — | — | — | Infine |
| "Hide" (Kris Menace featuring Miss Kittin) | 2012 | — | — | — | — | — | — | — | Features |
| "Exit" (Dubfire featuring Miss Kittin) | 2014 | — | — | — | — | — | — | — | Non-album single |
| "Pleasure and Pain" (Djedjotronic featuring Miss Kittin) | 2015 | — | — | — | — | — | — | — | Non-album single |
| "Stuff in the Trunk" (The Martinez Brothers featuring Miss Kittin) | 2016 | — | — | — | — | — | — | — | Non-album single |
| "Naboo" (Hot Since 82 featuring Miss Kittin) | 2021 | — | — | — | — | — | — | — | Recovery |
"—" denotes a recording that did not chart or was not released in that territory.

== Guest appearances ==
List of non-single guest appearances, with other performing artists, showing year released and album name
| Title | Year | Other artist(s) | Album |
|---|---|---|---|
| "Le Cha" | 1999 | Dakar & Grinser | Are You Really Satisfied Now |
| "After School Special" | 2001 | Detroit Grand Pubahs | Funk All Y'all |
| "Voicemail" | 2001 | Felix da Housecat | Kittenz and Thee Glitz |
| "Painkiller" | 2001 | Steve Bug | B Series Vol. 3 |
| "Shick Shaving" | 2003 | Chicks on Speed | 99 Cents |
| "Wordy Rappinghood" | 2003 | Chicks on Speed | 99 Cents |
| "The Game Is Not Over" | 2003 | T. Raumschmiere | Radio Blackout |
| "Masterplan" | 2004 | The Hacker | Rêves Mécaniques |
| "Diamonds, Fur Coat, Champagne" | 2009 | Primal Scream | Alan Vega 70th Birthday Limited Edition EP Series |
| "DNA" | 2010 | Xenia Beliayeva | Ever Since |
| "Ende" | 2011 | Robag Wruhme | Thora Vukk |

== Soundtrack appearances ==
| Title | Year | Other artist(s) | Film |
|---|---|---|---|
| "Madame Hollywood" | 2002 | Felix da Housecat | On Line |
| "Frank Sinatra" | 2003 | The Hacker | Party Monster |
| "Madame Hollywood" | 2003 | Felix da Housecat | Confidence |

== Remixes ==
| Title | Year | Artist | Album |
|---|---|---|---|
| "Toute Façon" | 1999 | Aeric | Non-album singles |
| "Freiburg V3.0" | 2000 | Tocotronic vs. Console | Non-album singles |
| "Kernkraft 400" | 2000 | Zombie Nation | Leichenschmaus |
| "Love Train" | 2002 | Frank Müller vs. Takkyu Ishino | Essential Underground Vol. 05 |
| "Alles Sehen" | 2003 | Ellen Allien | Berlinette |
| "The Puzzle" | 2004 | Electric Indigo | Six~Trak Reworks 2 |
| "We All Wanna Be Prince" | 2009 | Felix da Housecat | He Was King |
| "Cold" | 2010 | Cormac | Non-album single |
