= Party in My Head (Miss Kittin & The Hacker song) =

Single by Miss Kittin & The Hacker

from the album Two
- Released: 2009
- Recorded: 2008
- Genre: Electronica, electroclash
- Label: Nobody's Bizzness
- Songwriter(s): Caroline Hervé, Michel Amato
- Producer(s): Caroline Hervé, Michel Amato

Miss Kittin singles chronology
"1000 Dreams" (2009)	"Party in My Head" (2009)	"All You Need" (2011)

"Party in My Head" is a song by French recording duo Miss Kittin & The Hacker. It is the third and final single from their second album as a duo Two (2009).

== Critical reception ==
Alex Macpherson of The Guardian praised the song for being an exception to the skeletal beats of the duo's First Album, describing it as "enveloped in nostalgia for halcyon nights and propelled by driving bass."

== Track listing ==
1. "Party in My Head (Original)" - 6:35
2. "Party in My Head (Mr Pauli Remix)" - 6:15
3. "Party in My Head (Thieves Like Us Remix)" - 4:18
4. "Party in My Head (Kiko Remix)" - 7:26
