= Anthony Rother =

Electronic music producer and DJ

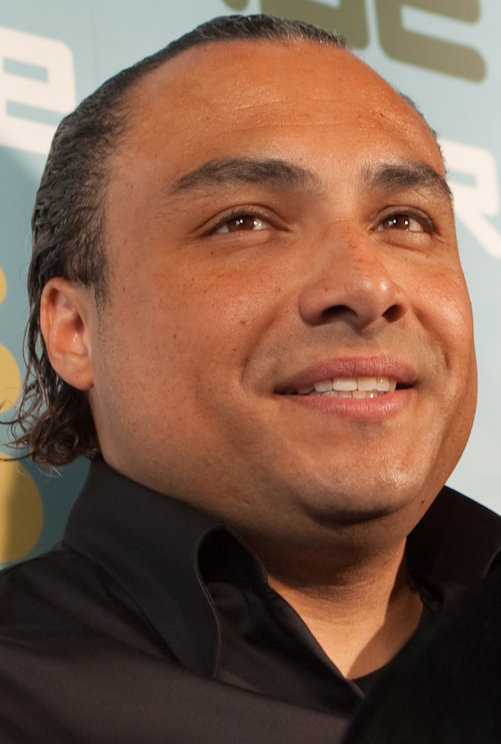
Anthony Rother.

Anthony Rother (born 29 April 1972) is an electronic music composer, producer and label owner living in Offenbach, Germany.

== Music style ==
Rother is considered a pioneer of a form of electronic music that developed in Europe in the 1990s, which combined elements of Italo dance music, synthpop, and electro fused with four on the floor rhythm. Rother's electro sound ("Sex With the Machines", "Simulationszeitalter", "Hacker") is characterized by repetitive machine-like beats, robotic, vocoder-driven vocals, melancholy, futuristic mood and lyrics that often deal with the consequences of technological progress, the relationship between humans and machines, and the role of computers in society.

In addition to electro, Rother also composes dark ambient music ("Elixir of Life", "Art Is a Technology"). He has also produced music for Sven Väth and DJ Hell.

== Discography ==
- $ex with the Machines (1997)
- Simulationszeitalter (2000)
- Art Is A Division of Pain (2001) (as Psi Performer)
- Little Computer People (2001) (as Little Computer People)
- Hacker (2002)
- Live Is Life Is Love (2003)
- Elixir of Life (2003) (ambient)
- Magic Diner (2003) (ambient)
- Popkiller (2004)
- Art Is A Technology (2005) (ambient)
- Super Space Model (2006)
- My Name Is Beuys Von Telekraft (2008)
- Popkiller II (2010)
- 62 Minutes On Mars (2011)
- The Machine Room (2011) (ambient)
- Verbalizer (2011)
- Netzwerk Der Zukunft (2014)
- Verbalizer (2014)
- Koridium (2015)
- Terazoid / Octagon (2015)

=== Compilations ===
- Various – In Electro We Trust (2004)
- Anthony Rother – This Is Electro (Works 1997 - 2005) (2005)
- Various – We Are Punks (2007)
- Various – We Are Punks 2 (2007)
- Various – We Are Punks 3 (2008)
- Various – Fuse Presents Anthony Rother (2009)
- Anthony Rother - Past Represents The Future (2012)
- Various – Robotics EP (2021)

=== Remixes ===
- ALBUM ADJ - MIX 2 - ADJ - MIX - Free download at Bandcamp
- Miss Kittin & The Hacker - "1982" (1998)

== Awards and nominations ==
=== Berlin Music Video Awards ===
The Berlin Music Video Awards is an international festival that promotes the art of music videos.

Year	Nominated work	Award	Result	Ref.
2025	"We Are Futurists - Future Kids"	Best AI	Nominated	
