= On the Road (Miss Kittin album) =

Compilation album by Miss Kittin
- Released: 12 February 2002
- Genre: Electronica; electroclash; dance; techno
- Label: Terminal M
- Producer: Miss Kittin

Miss Kittin chronology
First Album (2001)	On the Road (2002)	Radio Caroline Volume 1 (2002)

On the Road is the first DJ mix album by French singer and DJ Miss Kittin, released on 12 February 2002 by Terminal M.

== Critical reception ==
Professional ratings
Review scores
Source	Rating
AllMusic	4/5 stars

Jason Birchmeier of AllMusic described the album as "a wholehearted appeal to the more respectable and long-standing techno establishment", that proves her status "as a DJ rather than an electroclash diva", having "both the technical skills as well as the creativity to complement her unquestionably novel personality."

== Track listing ==
No.	Title	Writer(s)	Artist	Length
1.	"Motherfucking Bass" (Tanith Remix)	DJ Rush	DJ Rush	6:30
2.	"The Secret Chamber of Dreams" (album version remastered)	Sven Väth	Sven Väth	5:15
3.	"Ritual Fire Dance"		Gary Martin	2;32
4.	"Monique"		Kiko	3:41
5.	"Killabite"		Rob Jarvis	3;40
6.	"La Rock 01"		Vitalic	1:57
7.	"Voice of Africa (Voice 2)"		Umek	2:52
8.	"EBM 2"		Heckmann	5:56
9.	"Silver Screen Shower Scene" (Laurent Garnier Remix)		Felix da Housecat	5:23
10.	"The Divide"		James Ruskin	2:18
11.	"Velvet"		Samuel L. Session	3:49
12.	"Sex Is... Mathematics (All the False Idols)"		Makaton	1:57
13.	"Frank Sinatra 2001"		Miss Kittin & The Hacker	3:08
14.	"The Man with the Red Face"		Laurent Garnier	7:00
15.	"Elektrostatik"		Plastikman	4:56
16.	"Ooh Be Do"		Plaid	2:23
17.	"Futurist"		Pink Elln	5:29
