= Live at Sónar =

Live album by Miss Kittin
- Released: 16 January 2006
- Genre: Electronica, electroclash, dance, techno
- Label: NovaMute
- Producer: Miss Kittin, Pedri Gonzáles

Miss Kittin chronology
Mixing Me (2005)	Live at Sónar (2006)	A Bugged Out Mix (2006)

Live at Sónar is the first live DJ mix album by Miss Kittin. For the Sónar festival, Miss Kittin provided impromptu new vocals to her classic catalogue. During the festival, she was assisted by Aphex Twin, Modeselektor, Boom Bip, and The Hacker.

== Track listing ==
No.	Title	Writer(s)	Artist	Length
1.	"Azure Azure"	Tim Hecker	Tim Hecker	4:33
2.	"Happy Violentine (Mr. G Remix)"	Caroline Hervé, Thies Mynther, Tobias Neumann	Miss Kittin	6:05
3.	"Kuvio 3"	Mika Vainio	Philus	2:43
4.	"Masterplan"	Caroline Hervé	The Hacker featuring Miss Kittin	4:15
5.	"Track 4"	Stephan Metzger	Sleeparchive	1:48
6.	"Madame Hollywood (Ursula 1000 Remix)"	Caroline Hervé, Felix Stallings	Felix da Housecat featuring Miss Kittin	3:29
7.	"Requiem for a Hit (2 Many DJs Remix)"	Caroline Hervé, Thies Mynther, Tobias Neumann	Miss Kittin	3:00
8.	"Turn Deaf!"	Gernot Bronsert, Sebastian Szary	Modeselektor	4:49
9.	"Professional Distortion (Otto von Schirach Remix)"	Caroline Hervé, Thies Mynther, Tobias Neumann	Miss Kittin	3:00
10.	"Software Version"	Arpanet	Arpanet	0:50
11.	"Stock Exchange"	Caroline Hervé	Miss Kittin & The Hacker	0:57
12.	"1982"	Caroline Hervé	Miss Kittin & The Hacker	3:35
13.	"Run Jeremy's Window Licker"	Richard D. James	Aphex Twin	4:29
14.	"Dexter"	Ricardo Villalobos	Ricardo Villalobos	3:22
15.	"The Difference It Makes (Superpitcher Remix)"	Alastair Douglas, Rhys Evans	The MFA	6:11
16.	"Traumvogel"	Alex Paterson, Thomas Fehlmann	The Orb	3:21
17.	"Last Walk Around Mirror Lake (Boards of Canada Remix)"	Bryan Hollon	Boom Bip	4:18
18.	"The End"	Caroline Hervé	Miss Kittin	1:00

== Personnel ==
- Live DJ Mix, Vocals, Effects – Miss Kittin
- Digital Editing, Postproduction – Cristian Vogel, Enric Palau
- Mastering – Cristian Vogel
- Licensing – Gemma Martínez
- Photography – Biel Capllonch
- Recording Production – Pedri Gonzáles

== Charts ==
Chart (2006)	Peak position
French Albums Chart	136
