= Two (Miss Kittin & The Hacker album) =

Studio album by Miss Kittin & The Hacker
- Released: 12 March 2009
- Genre: Electronica; electroclash; dance; techno
- Length: 57:46
- Label: Nobody's Bizzness
- Producer: Miss Kittin; The Hacker

Miss Kittin chronology
BatBox (2008)	Two (2009)	Calling from the Stars (2013)

The Hacker chronology
Rêves Mécaniques (2004)	Two (2009)

Singles from Two
- 1. "PPPO" Released: 13 March 2009; 2. "1000 Dreams" Released: 3 April 2009; 3. "Party in My Head" Released: 19 June 2009

Two is the second studio album by French electronic music duo Miss Kittin & The Hacker, released on 12 March 2009 by Miss Kittin's label Nobody's Bizzness.

== Background and development ==
In 2007, Miss Kittin & The Hacker reunited to release the single "Hometown / Dimanche" through Good Life Recordings. The music video for "Hometown" was directed by Régis Brochier of 7th floor Productions. Miss Kittin & The Hacker reunited for a European tour in 2008, but they also toured throughout America and around the world, before they both started recording new songs, some of which were performed whilst touring. Several of the songs that they composed while on tour were included on the album Two.

== Promotion ==
Miss Kittin & The Hacker toured as part of the Get Loaded in the Park festival in August 2009.

Miss Kittin & The Hacker filmed a promotional music video for their cover of "Suspicious Minds", which was directed by Régis Brochier of 7th floor Productions. "Suspicious Minds" was later featured on the downloadable for free mixtape Skull of Dreams by Little Boots.

=== Singles ===
- "PPPO" was released as the album's first single on 13 March 2009.
- "1000 Dreams" was released as the album's second single on 3 April 2009. The song became a minor hit in Belgium, where it reached the top 20 of the Flanders Ultratip chart. The music video was directed by Régis Brochier of 7th floor Productions in January 2009.
- "Party in My Head" was released as the third and final single on 19 June 2009. XLR8R offered a free download of the Thieves Like Us remix of the single on its website.

== Critical reception ==
Professional ratings
Aggregate scores
Source	Rating
Metacritic	62/100
Review scores
Source	Rating
The Guardian	2/5 stars
Pitchfork	4.4/10
PopMatters	8/10
Resident Advisor	3.5/5
Slant Magazine	3/5 stars
URB	4.5/5 stars
Venus Zine	4/5 stars
XLR8R	6/10

Two received generally favorable reviews from music critics. At Metacritic, which assigns a normalised rating out of 100 to reviews from mainstream publications, the album received an average score of 62, based on 7 reviews. David Abravanel from PopMatters opined that "Two is as nakedly honest and lush an album as either party involved has made. [...] the record is a fantastic progression for Miss Kittin & The Hacker, managing to preserve what made them great partners in the first place, while gracefully maturing into something more multifaceted and emotionally open. Tom Naylor, writing for NME, commented that the album "finds them little changed. The Hacker is still a dab hand at dark electro, his rich, chewy tracks bubbling like molasses in a cauldron; Miss Kittin still veers close to self-parody (see 'Ray Ban') and they still sound best – 'Party In My Head', 'Emotional Interlude', a delicious, Europop cover of 'Suspicious Minds' – when they allow light, and vulnerability, to penetrate the gloom." URB remarked that "It seems as though they're as strong as ever. Is the production skeletal? You could say that. There isn't really a reason why that should be an issue though. Less is often more: any electro-head should know this to be true." Resident Advisor's Stéphane Girard opined, "In the end, Two isn't a massive step forward, but it isn't a step backward either. 'Suspicious Minds' aside, though, there is an air of self-confidence emanating from the songs collected on here that wasn't present eight years ago." In a review for XLR8R, Rob Geary stated, "Despite the ridiculously blank 'Ray Ban,' enough of Two excites by delving deeper into the subconscious (the crashing, Nord-led aggression of 'Indulgence') or stepping out into the sunlight (a goofy, cheerful cover of 'Suspicious Minds') to justify marking a calendar eight years from now for a Three." Angela Shawn-Chi Lu from Venus Zine stated, "Abstract expressionism has finally met its electro-clash match. At times experimental with instrumental song intros and abstrusely minimalist with their lyrics, French duo Miss Kittin & The Hacker would do Franz Kline proud with their knack for scrumptious, slaptastic tunes ideal for the BDSM scene."

Conversely, The Independent's Simon Price noted that "the temptation to revisit that blueprint – Kittin, the elegantly bored Euro-siren, meshing with Hacker's chattering techno textures – has eventually proven overwhelming. While Two never hits those heights, it has its club-friendly moments." Moreover, The Guardian's Alex Macpherson concluded that "on last year's sleek BatBox, she proved there was life in a shtick that, by rights, should have burned out half a decade ago in the dying embers of electroclash. But even as she pulled it off against the odds, one sensed the line between success and failure was being cut ever finer; and, in hooking up with her original partner in crime, The Hacker, Kittin has fallen on the wrong side of it." David Raposa from Pitchfork described the album "as a supposed remembrance of the heyday of electroclash, it's a nostalgia trip that's best left untaken." Eric Henderson, writing for Slant Magazine, commented that when compared to the duo's First Album, "The words are flatter, the music is more generically attractive, and maybe we're all getting a little too old for this club."

== Track listing ==
All tracks are written by Caroline Hervé and Michel Amato, except where noted

No.	Title	Writer(s)	Length
1.	"The Womb"		5:45
2.	"1000 Dreams"		5:26
3.	"PPPO"		6:29
4.	"Party in My Head"		6:38
5.	"Indulgence"		4:08
6.	"Emotional Interlude"		5:31
7.	"Suspicious Minds"	Mark James a.k.a. Francis Zambon	5:58
8.	"Electronic City"		4:46
9.	"Inutile Etérnité"		5:27
10.	"Ray Ban"		4:36
11.	"1000 Dreams (Reprise)"		3:02
Total length:			57:46

== Personnel ==
Credits adapted from the liner notes of Two.

- Miss Kittin – production, booklet photos
- The Hacker – production, booklet photos
- Pascal Gabriel – additional mixing at Studio Eleven (East London)
- Benjamin – mastering at Translab (Paris)
- Pierre-Jean Buisson – artwork, design

== Charts ==
Chart performance for Two
Chart (2009)	Peak position
Belgian Alternative Albums (Ultratop Flanders)	48
Belgian Albums (Ultratop Wallonia)	87
French Albums (SNEP)	102
