= Stock Exchange (song) =

Single by Miss Kittin & The Hacker

from the album First Album
- Released: February 10, 2003 (Germany); February 25, 2003 (U.S.)
- Recorded: 2001
- Genre: Electroclash, electronica
- Length: 5:22
- Label: International DeeJay Gigolo Records
- Songwriter(s): Caroline Hervé, Michel Amato

Miss Kittin singles chronology
"Autopilot" (2003)	"Stock Exchange" (2003)	"The Beach" (2003)

Music video
- "Stock Exchange" on Vimeo

"Stock Exchange" is the third single from the duo Miss Kittin & The Hacker's debut album First Album.

== Writing and inspiration ==
Lyrically, "Stock Exchange" deals with the life of a high end Wall Street businesslady. The lyrics support this, including how the men "touch her bum in the lift of the Empire State [building]". And also the lyrics, "Is it real this pink punk costume I wear? All the time to seduce Japanese 'hommes d'affaire' [English:businessmen]." She also has suicidal ideations as she sings that she is "dreaming of a hot bath, cutting my veins."

== Composition ==
"Stock Exchange" is credited as an electroclash song with disco and rave influences.

== Critical reception ==
Mark Beaumont of NME said that Miss Kittin "monotones like a German robot Cheeky Girl over some nifty "Vice City" disco, prompting a moral debate on whether its possible to sexually assualt [sic] a lift tannoy system."

== Cultural impact ==
"Stock Exchange" appeared on the mix albums Fuck Me I'm Famous by David Guetta, and FabricLive.33 by Spank Rock.

== Music video ==
The music video for "Stock Exchange" was directed by Régis Brochier of 7th Floor Productions.

== Live performances ==
Miss Kittin performed "Stock Exchange" live at the Sónar festival and included it on her album Live at Sónar.

== Track listing ==
1. "Stock Exchange (Original)" –
2. "Stock Exchange (Adam Sky Remix)" –

== Charts ==
Chart (2003)	Peak Position
UK Singles Chart	118
UK Dance Singles Chart	14
