= Frank Sinatra (Miss Kittin & The Hacker song) =

2000 single by Miss Kittin & The Hacker

Single by Miss Kittin & The Hacker

from the EP Champagne
- Released: 1998
- Genre: Electronica, electroclash
- Label: International DeeJay Gigolo
- Songwriters: Caroline Hervé, Michel Amato
- Producers: Caroline Hervé, Michel Amato

Miss Kittin singles chronology
"The Vogue" (2000)	"Frank Sinatra" (1998)	"Silver Screen Shower Scene" (2001)

Music video
- "Frank Sinatra" on YouTube

"Frank Sinatra" is a song by French recording duo Miss Kittin & The Hacker. The song was originally included on the duo's 1998 EP Champagne and became an anthem of the electroclash scene. It was later included on the duo's debut studio album First Album (2001), as well as on Miss Kittin's DJ mix album On the Road (2002).

== Writing and inspiration ==
Miss Kittin explained in an interview that the song was inspired by her love of Frank Sinatra and jazz music.

"I love Frank Sinatra and the American crooners and romantic jazz in general. I was looking for a rhyme to "area" and here it came. What you don't know, is when I said "He's dead", I really thought he was... A friend told me it was funny because he's still alive... I couldn't believe it and felt guilty, especially when he died three months later..."

== Composition ==
"Frank Sinatra" is credited as an electroclash and techno song, and is noted for its use of deadpan. In the song, Miss Kittin discusses having sex in limousines. According to Terry Sawyer of PopMatters, "In a deadpan cadence done in the accent of Ilsa the She-Wolf of The SS, Miss Kittin [...], created decadent club music for people too arch and smart for typical white label fare. It was a deader and more desolate take on tired convention of the house beat and unknown diva repeating a pithy chorus ad nauseum [sic], an alleged elevation of cliché through the detachment of kitsch.

== Critical reception ==
Adam Bregman of Allmusic described the song as "undoubtedly the standout cut on the album." Ed Gonzalez, writing for Slant Magazine, said, "Backed by The Hacker's happy-to-be-cheap retro production, Miss Kittin provides the ultimate electroclash statement: she makes social climbing sound so stupid and empty, while reveling in it."

Slant Magazine placed "Frank Sinatra" at number eighty-six on its 100 Greatest Dance Songs list. Rock De Lux placed the song at number thirteen on the Songs of the Year list for 2001. The Village Voice included the song on its Pazz & Jop Singles list for 2002.

== Cultural impact ==
"Frank Sinatra" was included on compilation albums Global Underground 010: Athens by Danny Tenaglia, American Gigolo by Tiga, Dirty Dirty House Vol. 1 by Junior Sanchez, Lektroluv by Dr Lektroluv, and GU10.

In 2003, "Frank Sinatra" was featured in the American biographical comedy-drama film Party Monster and its soundtrack. The soundtrack peaked at number twenty-one on the US Billboard Dance/Electronic Albums.

== Track listings ==
- German EP

A1. "Gigolo Intro" - 1:52
A2. "Frank Sinatra" - 3:51
A3. "The Grey Area" - 5:16
B1. "1982" - 5:17
B2. "Gratin Dauphinois" - 3:31
B3. "Gigolo Outro" - 2:02
B4. "Dirty Talk" - 2:05

- Belgian Vinyl, 12-inch single
1. "Frank Sinatra (Promo)" -
2. "Frank Sinatra (Vocal Out)" -
- U.S. Vinyl, 12-inch single
1. "Frank Sinatra" -
2. "Frank Sinatra 2001" -
3. "DJ Song" -
