= Klein + M.B.O. =

Italian musical group

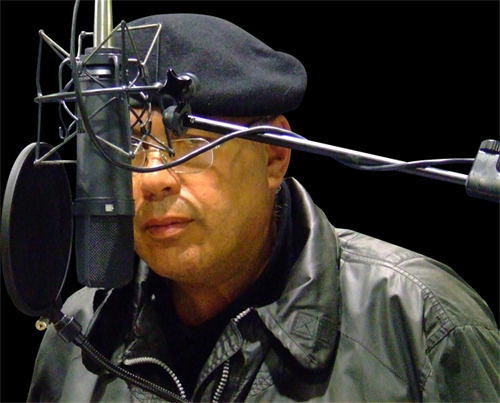
- Mario Boncaldo in 2007

Background information
- Origin: Milan, Italy
- Genres: Electro, post-disco, garage house, Italo disco
- Labels: Zanza (Italy); Atlantic (US)
- Members: Mario Boncaldo
- Website: http://www.kleinandmbo.it

Klein + M.B.O. were an Italian Italo disco musical group formed by producers, songwriters and arrangers Mario Boncaldo (from Italy) and Tony Carrasco (from United States). Rossana Casale, a jazz singer along with American chorus singer Naimy Hacket, provided vocals on their records.

They are best known for their single "Dirty Talk" which was originally released in Milan, Italy in 1982. It became an international underground hit. Further single releases such as "Wonderful", "More Dirty Talk", "The MBO Theme" and others continues in a similar vein. Some of their songs were released in the United States by Atlantic Records.

The first and only Klein + M.B.O. album was released initially as De-Ja-Vu and then later as First. The album was recorded using Roland synthesizers and a Roland TR-808 drum machine and featured Davide Piatto on guitar.

French recording duo Miss Kittin & The Hacker covered "Dirty Talk" for their 1998 EP Champagne. German electropop band Moskwa TV released "Tekno Talk" which is almost a genuine cover of "Dirty Talk" in 1985, with the "Bombing Mix" gaining some popularity due to the use of Ronald Reagan's infamous "We begin bombing in five minutes" off-the-record joke as the intro sample.

== Discography ==
Year	Song	Label	(United States) Dance Singles	(United States) R&B Singles
1982	"Dirty Talk"	Zanza / 25 West	No. 14	―
1982	"More Dirty Talk"	Zanza	―	―
1982	"Wonderful"	Zanza / Atlantic	No. 31	―
1983	"The MBO Theme"	Zanza / Atlantic	―	―
1986	"Keep In Touch"	Zanza / Dance-Sing	―	―
