= A Bugged Out Mix (Miss Kittin album) =

Compilation album by Miss Kittin
- Released: (United Kingdom) April 17, 2006
- Genre: Dance
- Label: Rough Trade (Belgium); Resist Music (UK); System Recordings (U.S.)
- Producer: Miss Kittin

Miss Kittin chronology
Live at Sónar (2006)	A Bugged Out Mix (2006)	BatBox (2008)

A Bugged Out Mix is the third DJ mix album by French recording artist Miss Kittin, released in the United Kingdom on April 17, 2006. A number of electronic music artists were featured on the album, including fellow electroclash musician Princess Superstar, Squarepusher, and Saint Etienne.

== Critical reception ==
Professional ratings
Review scores
Source	Rating
Exclaim	favorable
Gigwise.com	3/5 stars

The album received generally favorable reviews. Stephanie Kale from Exclaim noted, "The range of what Miss Kittin mixes truly reveals her talent for bringing disparate styles and rhythms together in a way that makes sense." Likewise, Scott Colothan from Gigwise.com said that "the main strength in this album is its sheer unpredictability and refusal to adhere to the build-up/release formula inherent to many live sets."

== Track listing ==
=== Disc One: Perfect Night ===
No.	Title	Writer(s)	Artist	Length
1.	"Perfect (A Capella)"	Concetta Kirschner, Milo Berger	Princess Superstar	0:45
2.	"Plastic People (K-1 Original Mix)"	Keith Tucker	DJ K!	3:40
3.	"Ibiza"	Bruno Van Garsse, Michel Nachtergaele, Stephan Novak	El Loco	4:37
4.	"Percolator (Keep Movin Mix)"	Curtis Jones	Cajmere	3:00
5.	"151 (Terrace Mixx)"	Armando	Armando	4:07
6.	"Vakuum Audio"	Christopher Bleckmann, Hannes Wenner	Misc	3:52
7.	"Serpentine"	Nicolas Höppner	My My	4:17
8.	"Avon 1 (James Ruskin Remix)"	Karl O'Connor, Peter Sutton	Female vs. Regis	3:22
9.	"A Walking Contradiction (Part 1)"	Adam Beyer	Adam Beyer	4:35
10.	"Freefall (The Hacker Remix)"	Douglas McCarthy, Terence Fixmer	Fixmer/McCarthy	4:55
11.	"Base 6"	Edmund Simons, Thomas Rowlands	The Chemical Brothers	4:31
12.	"Lost Vessel"	Drexciya	Drexciya	4:13
13.	"13 (In 2 Parts)"	Ian Clark	Perspects	3:41
14.	"Seven Eleven"	GE & GM	GE & GM	3:00
15.	"Hasir"	Gernot Bronsert, Sebastian Szary	Modeselektor	3:57
16.	"Paroles"	Wolfgang Voigt	Mike Ink	4:10
17.	"Don't Go (Kicks Like a Mule Mix)"	Peter Orme	Awesome 3	3:18
18.	"Vanilla Monkey"	Steve Milanese	Milanese	3:43
19.	"First In, First Out"	Daniel Bressanutti, Jean-Luc De Meyer, Patrick Codenys, Richard Jonckheere	Front 242	1:46
20.	"Destiny"	DJ Maxximus, Something J	DJ Maxximus & Something J	2:46
21.	"My Red Hot Car"	Thomas Jenkinson	Squarepusher	1:22
22.	"Perfect Girl"	Alexander Chesler, Matthew Moran	Acrosome	3:41

=== Disc Two: Perfect Day ===
No.	Title	Writer(s)	Artist	Length
1.	"Sting ≠3 (That's Good)"	Si Begg	Si Begg	0:43
2.	"Shadows"	Luke Vibert	Wagon Christ	4:05
3.	"Invisible"	Alexander Polzin	Monolake	3:37
4.	"Normal (Is It Normal? Club Mix)"	Baby Ford	Baby Ford	5:02
5.	"Metal Slave"	Brando Lupi, Donato Scaramuzzi	Donato Dozzy & Brando Lupi	5:51
6.	"Heart Failed (Two Lone Swordsmen Mix)"	Bob Stanley, Pete Wiggs, Sarah Cracknall	Saint Etienne	2:57
7.	"Groove"	Jay Haze	Jay Haze	2:03
8.	"Untitled A1"	Richard Devine	Richard Devine	4:13
9.	"Aluminum Rectangles"	Adam Equation, Ian Cinch-Jones, Jack Vulpine	Le Car	2:36
10.	"Falling Free (Aphex Twin Mix)"	Dean Garcia, Toni Halliday	Curve	5:45
11.	"The Knowledge"	Damien Russell	Toasty	4:09
12.	"Rank"	Arthur Smith	Artwork	3:18
13.	"Another Level"	Daniel Meteo, Sumartie Bhardwaj, Tobias Hett	Alb Featuring MC Soom-T	3:42
14.	"08:00"	Richie Hawtin	Concept 1	3:21
15.	"Transfer Please, Perfect Wednesday"	Sixtoo	Sixtoo	2:48
16.	"Easy Lee (Cassy Lee Mix)"	Ricardo Villalobos	Ricardo Villalobos	3:28
17.	"Inside Your Heaven"	Hanno Leichtmann	Static	4:02
18.	"Le Grand Dôme"	Geir Jenssen	Biosphere	4:53
19.	"Kalea Morning"	Chad Mossholder, Greg Malcolm	Twine	5:39
20.	"Medulla Oblongata"	Christopher Horne	Christ	1:13

== Personnel ==
- Artwork (Cover Design) – Bente Schipp
- DJ Mix – Miss Kittin
- Mastering – Craig Dormer, Richard Tugwell

== Charts ==
Chart (2006)	Peak position
Belgian Compilation Albums Chart (Wallonia)	18
French Albums Chart	170
