= List of electroclash bands and artists =

This is a list of electroclash bands and artists.

== A-K ==
- Add N to (X)
- Adult.
- A.R.E. Weapons
- Alice in Videoland
- Alter Ego
- Amanda Blank
- Avenue D
- Ayesha Erotica
- The Blow
- Brutalismus 3000
- Cansei de Ser Sexy
- Cazwell
- Cherry Bikini
- Chicks on Speed
- Chris Korda
- Client
- Cobra Killer
- Collider
- Crystal Castles
- Cursor Miner
- Die Antwoord
- Digitalism
- Dirty Sanchez
- DJ Hell
- Electrocute
- Electrosexual
- Ellen Allien
- Felix da Housecat
- Fischerspooner
- Freezepop
- Fred Falke
- Futurecop!
- Gang Gang Dance
- Gil Mantera's Party Dream
- Golden Boy
- Grum
- Goldfrapp
- Hot Chip
- I-F
- IAMX
- Justice
- Kap Bambino

== L-Z ==
- Ladytron
- Larry Tee
- Leif
- Lesbians on Ecstasy
- Le Tigre
- Linda Lamb
- Lindstrøm
- Lolly Pop
- Maria Daniela y su Sonido Lasser
- Miami Horror
- Midnight Juggernauts
- Miss Kittin
- Mount Sims
- Namosh
- Peaches
- Phiiliip
- Ping Pong Bitches
- The Presets
- Princess Superstar
- Robots in Disguise
- Röyksopp
- Scissor Sisters (early songs)
- Sexy Sushi
- Shiny Toy Guns
- Snow Strippers
- Slayyyter
- Soviet (band)
- Spalding Rockwell
- Spank Rock
- The Faint
- The Hacker
- The Laws
- The Scientists of Modern Music
- The Whip
- Tiga
- Terry Poison
- Tying Tiffany
- Vitalic
