= GU10 (album) =

Compilation album (mixtape)
- Released: May 15, 2006
- Genre: Progressive house
- Label: Global Underground Ltd.
- Compiler: Trafik

GU10 is a triple CD 10th anniversary release from Global Underground Ltd. celebrating their Global Underground series. Discs 1 and 2 feature tracks from the past ten years whereas the third features tracks produced from earlier. Aside from the standard three CD package, there is also a three LP edition as well as a special limited edition which features a bonus unmixed fourth disc.

== Track listing ==
=== Disc one ===
1. Underworld - Two Months Off
2. Laurent Garnier - Man With The Red Face (Jan Driver Mix)
3. Fatboy Slim - Sunset (Bird Of Prey)
4. Pascal F.E.O.S. - I Can Feel That
5. Jark Prongo - Movin Thru Your System
6. Alex Dolby - Psiko Garden
7. Albion - Air
8. Libra Presents Taylor - Anomaly (Calling Your Name)
9. Polaroid - So Damn Beautiful (Amethyst Mix)
10. Pako - Steel Blue (GUX 2006 Re-Edit)
11. Gipsy - I Trance You (Pappa & Gilbey Mix)
12. Planisphere - Deep Blue Dream/PQM - You Are Sleeping (Acappella)
13. PQM - You Are Sleeping (Luke Chable Vocal Pass)
14. Private Productions - Sexdrive (M & B's Instructor Mix)
15. Chable & Bonnici - Ride (Mashtronic Remix)
16. Felix Da Housecat - Silver Screen Shower Scene (Thin White Duke Remix)
17. Steve Lawler - Rise In (Original Vocal Mix)
18. Billie Ray Martin - Honey (Deep Dish Hoojee Dub)
19. Layo & Bushwacka! - Let The Good Times Roll
20. Ian Brown - F.E.A.R. (UNKLE Remix)

=== Disc two ===
1. Dark Globe - Break My World
2. Lustral - Everytime (Nalin & Kane Remix)
3. Sander Kleinenberg - Sacred (Dub)
4. Alcatraz - Give Me Luv (That Kid Chris Tribute Mix)
5. Breeder - Sputnik (New York FM Mix)
6. Cass & Slide - Perception
7. Space Manoeuvres - Stage One (Pariah Mix)/(Total Separation Mix)
8. Lostep - The Roots
9. The Forth - Reality Detached (K Roxx 06 Separation Mix)
10. Miss Kittin & The Hacker - Frank Sinatra
11. Moonface - Overactive
12. KC Flightt vs. Funky Junction - Voices (Pete Heller Mix)
13. Pete Lazonby - Sacred Cycles (Jens Mahlstedt Mix)/(Quivver Mix)/(Original Mix)
14. Talisman & Hudson - Leaving Planet Earth (GUX 2006 Re-Edit)
15. Danny Tenaglia - Turn Me On (Bedrock Mix)
16. Tilt - I Dream (Tilt's Resurrection Mix)/(Casa De Angeles Mix)

=== Disc three ===
1. Slam - Eterna
2. The Beloved - Your Love Takes Me Higher (Chillum Willum Mix)
3. Uncle Bob - Uncle Bob's Burly House
4. 280 West - Scattered Dreams (Boom Chocka-Boom Mix)
5. The Reese Project - Colour Of Love (Deep Reese Mix)
6. De Melero - Night Moves (En El Calor De La Noche Mix)/De Melero's Groove/Night Moves (Moniapella)
7. Double FM - The Sound Of Amnesia (Amnesia Mix)
8. Andronicus -Make You Whole (Freashly Squeezed Mix)
9. Alfredo - Inspiration (0224 Mix)
10. Furry Phreaks - Gonna Find A Way (Major Dude Mix)
11. The Good Men - Make Up Your Mind
12. Coco Steel & Lovebomb - Feel It
13. Band In A Box - Get Dynamite
14. Egma - Let The Bass Kick
15. Mental Cube - Q (Santa Monica Mix)
16. Reese & Santonio - Rock To The Beat
17. Ralphi Rosario - You Used to Hold Me
18. Rejuvenation - I.B.O.
19. Caspar Pound - Fever Called Love (Ambient Mix)
20. LFO - LFO (The Leeds Warehouse Mix)
21. SAS - Amber Groove (Toxic Hijack Remix)
22. Sublime - The Theme
23. S.S.R. - To Be House
24. Play Boys - Mindgames (You Keep Playing Guitar)
25. Salt City Orchestra - The Book (Bookin' Da Beats)
26. Slacker - Scared (The Lonely Traveller)
27. PKA - Temperatures Rising (Music For The Masses)
28. Sasha & Maria - Be As One
