= 1000 Dreams =

Single by Miss Kittin & The Hacker

from the album Two
- Released: 3 April 2009
- Recorded: 2008
- Genre: Electronica, electroclash
- Label: Nobody's Bizzness
- Songwriters: Caroline Hervé, The Hacker

Miss Kittin singles chronology
"PPPO" (2009)	"1000 Dreams" (2009)	"Party in My Head" (2009)

Music video
- "1000 Dreams" on YouTube

"1000 Dreams" is a song performed by French recording duo Miss Kittin & The Hacker, taken from their second studio album, Two. It was released in April 2009, as the album's second single by Nobody's Bizzness. "1000 Dreams" became a minor hit in Belgium, where it reached top-twenty on the Flanders Ultratip chart. The song was used to open the 2009-2010 Fall/Winter Dior haute couture collection.

== Composition ==
"1000 Dreams" is credited as a Europop song and is influenced by Depeche Mode, Kraftwerk, Robyn, and Tracey Thorn. The Kraftwerk influences are prominent in the riffs of the song.

== Critical reception ==
Eric Henderson of Slant Magazine gave a critical view of the album Two, yet praised the song, commenting, "Miss Kittin floats on the clouds of '1000 Dreams,' firm in her belief that indulging in myriad rewardless sensations will ultimately prove its own reward."

Chris Todd from Clash placed "1000 Dreams" at number two on the Top 20 Songs of 2009.

== Track listing ==
- Promo - CD single
1. "1000 Dreams" (Radio Cut By Kittin) - 3:47
2. "1000 Dreams" (Original) - 5:24
- Vinyl, 12-inch single
1. "1000 Dreams" (Maxime Dangles Remix) - 7:28
2. "1000 Dreams" (Original) - 5:23
3. "1000 Dreams" (Instrumental) - 5:27

== Charts ==
Chart (2009)	Peak Position
Belgium (Ultratip Bubbling Under Flanders)	20

== Release history ==
Region	Date	Format	Label
France	3 April 2009	Vinyl, 12-inch single	Nobody's Bizzness
United Kingdom	20 April 2009	Vinyl, 12-inch single	Nobody's Bizzness
United States	19 May 2009	Vinyl, 12-inch single	Nobody's Bizzness
United States	19 May 2009	Digital download	Nobody's Bizzness
