= Madame Hollywood =

Single by Felix da Housecat feat. Miss Kittin

from the album Kittenz and Thee Glitz
- Released: 2002
- Recorded: 2001
- Genre: House; electroclash
- Label: City Rockers
- Songwriter(s): Caroline Hervé; Felix Stallings
- Producer(s): Felix da Housecat

Felix da Housecat singles chronology
"Harlot" (2001)	"Madame Hollywood" (2002)

Miss Kittin singles chronology
"Je t'aime... moi non plus" (2001)	"Madame Hollywood" (2002)	"Rippin Kittin" (2002)

Music video
- "Madame Hollywood" on YouTube

"Madame Hollywood" is the third single featuring Miss Kittin from Felix da Housecat's album Kittenz and Thee Glitz.

== Composition ==
"Madame Hollywood" is credited as a tech house and electroclash song.

== Critical reception ==
Paul Cooper of Pitchfork Media said,"Kittin's dull-as-dishwater celebrity fantasies and irritatingly neutral delivery pale in comparison to how Harrison Crump performs in an identical environment. It's the difference between true talent and a plastic knock-off."

== Music video ==
The music video for "Madame Hollywood" was directed by Guy Sagy. It features elderly ladies lip-synching to the song.

== Live performances ==
Miss Kittin performed "Madame Hollywood (Ursula 1000 Remix)" live for the Sónar festival and included it on her album Live at Sónar.

== Track listing ==
- U.S. Vinyl single
1. "Madame Hollywood (Tiga's Mister Hollywood Version)" -
2. "Madame Hollywood (Ursula 1000 Remix)" -
3. "Silver Screen Shower Scene (Adult Mix)" -
4. "Madame Hollywood (Richard Vission Remix)" -
5. "Madame Hollywood (Ralph Myerz and the Jack Herren Band Remix)" -

== Charts ==
=== Weekly charts ===
Weekly chart performance for "Madame Hollywood"
Chart (2002)	Peak Position
Canada (Nielsen Soundscan)	19
US Hot Dance Music/Maxi-Singles Sales (Billboard)	11

=== Year-end charts ===
Year-end chart performance for "Madame Hollywood"
Chart (2002)	Peak Position
Canada (Nielsen SoundScan)	152

== Song usage ==
"Madame Hollywood' was used on the mix album Ultra.80's vs Electro. Tiga included his "Madame Hollywood (Tiga's Mister Hollywood Version)" on his mix album DJ-Kicks: Tiga.
