= GU10 =

GU10 may refer to:

- A bi-pin connector for light bulbs
- GU10 (album) from Global Underground
- Part of the GU postcode area within Surrey, England
