= Party in My Head =

Party in My Head may refer to:

- Party in My Head (Miss Kittin & The Hacker song)
- Party in My Head (September song)
- Party in My Head, a song by Sophie Ellis-Bextor, from the album Shoot from the Hip
