= Metalhead =

A metalhead is a member of the heavy metal subculture.

Metalhead may also refer to:

== Music ==
- Metalhead (album), 1999 album by Saxon
- "Metalhead", a song by Blotto
- "Metalhead", a song from the 2008 Miss Kittin album BatBox
- Metalheadz, an English drum and bass record label

== Fiction ==
=== Films ===
- Metalhead (film), a 2013 Icelandic film

=== Characters ===
- Metalhead (Teenage Mutant Ninja Turtles), two characters from the Teenage Mutant Ninja Turtles franchise
- Metalhead (character), a Marvel Comics character
- Metal-Head, a character from the G.I. Joe: A Real American Hero series

=== Other ===
- "Metalhead" (Black Mirror), an episode of anthology series Black Mirror
- Metalheads (TV series), British animated series
- Metal Head, a first-person shooter mecha simulation video game
