= Champagne (EP) =

EP by Miss Kittin & The Hacker
- Released: 6 July 1998
- Recorded: 1997
- Genres: Electropop, electroclash, techno
- Label: International DeeJay Gigolo
- Producers: Caroline Hervé, Michel Amato

Miss Kittin chronology
Champagne (1998)	Intimités (1999)

The Hacker chronology
Girls on Film (1998)	Champagne (1998)	A Strange Day (1999)

Singles from Champagne
- 1. "1982" Released: 1998

Champagne is the debut extended play (EP) by the French recording duo Miss Kittin & The Hacker, which was released in July 1998. The EP became an immediate hit in Germany and Europe. Several of the album's songs were later included on the duo's debut studio album First Album.

== Background and development ==
While establishing themselves as musicians and appearing on several compilation albums for Mental Groove Records, Miss Kittin & The Hacker eventually signed to DJ Hell's label International DeeJay Gigolo Records to release their debut EP as a duo Champagne. The Hacker explained in an interview with In the Mix about the musical direction of the EP:

When we started we decided that we won’t do classic techno. We wanted to bring back some human feelings to electronic music, and also, very important, some lyrics and with Miss Kittin’s words it was perfect. At last electronic music had something to say! Another thing was that I wanted to use classic song structure in an electronic style.

== Singles ==
- "1982" was released worldwide as the album's commercial lead single in 1998. The song became an underground hit and was featured on German MTV.

== Track listing ==
All lyrics are written by Miss Kittin & The Hacker, except where otherwise noted.

No.	Title	Writer(s)	Length
1.	"Gigolo Intro"		1:52
2.	"Frank Sinatra"		3:51
3.	"The Grey Area"		5:16
4.	"1982"		5:17
5.	"Gratin Dauphinois"		3:31
6.	"Gigolo Outro"		2:02
7.	"Dirty Talk"	Klein + M.B.O.	2:05
