= Emily the Strange =

Fictional character

Emily the Strange No. 1, Dark Horse Comics (August 2005)

Emily the Strange is an illustrated fictional character featured in several comic books, graphic novels and in various merchandise and clothing lines. She was created by Rob Reger for his company Cosmic Debris Etc. Inc. located in San Francisco, California.

== History ==
Rob Reger received permission to use the character design from Nathan Carrico, who first designed Emily in 1991 for Santa Cruz Skateboards. She first appeared on Santa Cruz Skateboards professional skater Ross Goodman's skateboard graphics.

== Publications ==
Emily the Strange has featured in print publications by publishers including Chronicle Books, Dark Horse Comics, and HarperCollins.

The Chronicle Books hardback graphic novellas include:

- Emily the Strange (2001)
- Emily's Secret Book of Strange (2003)
- Emily's Good Nightmares (2005)
- Emily's Seeing Is Deceiving (2006)

Since 2008, Emily the Strange has been published in France by Soleil Productions.

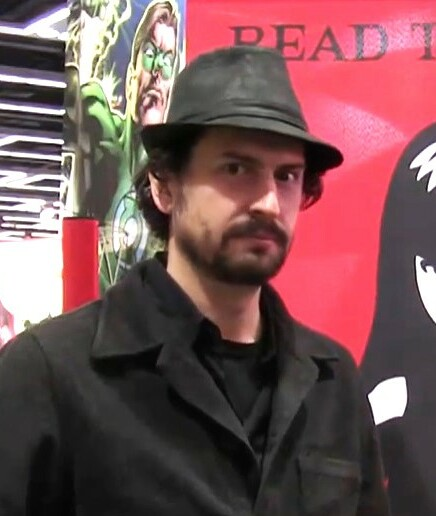
Rob Reger at the 2011 Emerald City Comic Con

=== Dark Horse Comic Book Series ===
From 2005 to 2013, Dark Horse Comics published a comic series featuring Emily the Strange. They also released collected editions of reprinted material.

In addition to the comics, Dark Horse Comics published an art book, The Art of Emily the Strange, a collection of images showing the wide range of artistic styles and media that have been used to create the world of Emily the Strange, and the art of Rob Reger, Buzz Parker, and a large number of collaborators.

Emily the Strange
Issue/Title	Date	Writer	Art	Cover	Notes
Emily the Strange #1: The Boring Issue	August 2005	Rob Reger, Brian Brooks, Jessica Gruner	Buzz Parker	Buzz Parker	Comic interview: The Damned; Guest Artist: Brian Brooks
Emily the Strange #2: The Lost Issue	December 2005	Rob Reger, Brian Brooks, Jessica Gruner, Buffy Visick	Buzz Parker	Rob Reger	Guest Artist: Rob Reger; Fold out poster
Emily the Strange #3: The Dark Issue	September 2006	Rob Reger, Brian Brooks, Jessica Gruner, Kitty Remmington	Buzz Parker	Buzz Parker	Comic interview: Marilyn Manson; Guest Artist: Mike Moon
Emily the Strange #4: The Rock Issue	April 2007	Rob Reger, Brian Brooks, Jessica Gruner	Buzz Parker, Ryan Hill	Buzz Parker	Comic interview with Karen O; Guest Artist: Winston Smith
Emily the Strange #1: The Death Issue	August 2007	Rob Reger, Jessica Gruner, Kitty Remington, Buzz Parker	Buzz Parker, Ryan Hill	Buzz Parker	Guest Artist: Tim Biskup; Fan art (Strange Exchange)
Emily the Strange #2: The Fake Issue	October 2007	Rob Reger, Jessica Gruner, Kitty Remington	Buzz Parker, Ryan Hill, Nix Turner	Buzz Parker	Guest Artist: Jason Mecier; Fan art (Strange Exchange)
Emily the Strange #3: The Revenge Issue	May 2008	Rob Reger, Jessica Gruner, Kitty Remington	Buzz Parker, Ryan Hill, Nix Turner	Buzz Parker	Guest Artist: Turo "Scissorhands"; Fan art (Strange Exchange)
Emily the Strange #4: The Alone Issue	August 2008	Rob Reger, Jessica Gruner, Kitty Remington, Buzz Parker, Nix Turner, Matthew Weiss	Buzz Parker, Ryan Hill, Nix Turner	Buzz Parker	Guest Artist: Fawn Gehweiler; Fan art (Strange Exchange)
Emily the Strange: The 13th Hour #1	July 2009	Rob Reger	Buzz Parker	Buzz Parker	
Emily the Strange: The 13th Hour #2	November 2009	Rob Reger	Buzz Parker	Buzz Parker	
Emily the Strange: The 13th Hour #3	May 2010	Rob Reger, Jessica Gruner	Buzz Parker	Buzz Parker	
Emily the Strange: The 13th Hour #4	October 2010	Rob Reger	Buzz Parker	Buzz Parker	
Emily and the Strangers #1	January 2013	Mariah Huehner, Rob Reger	Emily Ivie	Emily Ivie, Buzz Parker	Variant Cover: Rich Black
Emily and the Strangers #2	March 2013	Mariah Huehner, Rob Reger	Emily Ivie	Emily Ivie, Buzz Parker	Variant Cover: Winston Smith
Emily and the Strangers #3	July 2013	Mariah Huehner, Rob Reger	Emily Ivie	Emily Ivie, Buzz Parker	Variant Cover: Cynthia Von Buhler; Centerfold poster
Emily and the Strangers: Breaking the Record #1	June 2014	Mariah Huehner, Rob Reger	Cat Farris	Cat Farris, Buzz Parker	
Emily and the Strangers: Breaking the Record #2	July 2014	Mariah Huehner, Rob Reger	Cat Farris	Cat Farris, Buzz Parker	
Emily and the Strangers: Breaking the Record #3	August 2014	Mariah Huehner, Rob Reger	Cat Farris	Cat Farris, Buzz Parker	
Emily and the Strangers: Road to Nowhere Tour	March 2017	Mariah Huehner, Rob Reger	Cat Farris	Cat Farris, Buzz Parker	HB
Free Comic Book Day 2009	May 2009	Rob Reger, Buzz Parker	Buzz Parker	Buzz Parker & others	4-page Emily the Strange short story "Family Tree" included

=== Collected editions ===
Dark Horse's Emily the Strange comics have been collected in trade paperbacks and limited-edition hardcovers, each including a sketchbook and extra material from the original publications.

Title	Release date	Material collected	ISBN
Emily the Strange ― Volume 1: Lost, Dark, and Bored	November 22, 2006	Emily the Strange (2005-2007) #1-3; Comic interview: Elvira Mistress of the Dark	9781593075736 (TPB)
Emily the Strange ― Volume 2: Rock, Death, Fake, Revenge, and Alone	September 9, 2009	Emily the Strange (2005-2007) #4; Emily the Strange (2007-2008) #1-4	9781595822215 (TPB)
Emily the Strange ― Volume 3: The 13th Hour	May 18, 2011	Emily the Strange: The 13th Hour #1-4	9781595827005 (TPB)
The Complete Emily the Strange: All Things Strange	June 29, 2016 (HB) February 10, 2021 (TPB)	Volumes 1-3 above; Free Comic Book Day 2009 short story "Family Tree"	9781506700618 (HB) 9781506722016 (TPB)

Emily and the Strangers
Title	Release date	Material collected	ISBN
Emily and the Strangers: Battle of the Bands	May 7, 2014	Emily and the Strangers #1-3	9781616553234 (HB)
Emily and the Strangers Volume 2: Breaking the Record	March 4, 2015	Emily and the Strangers: Breaking the Record #1-3	9781616555986 (HB)
Emily and the Strangers Volume 3: Road to Nowhere Tour	March 29, 2017	This series was not published in single edition comics	9781506700588 (HB)

=== HarperCollins young adult novel series ===
In October 2007, Publishers Weekly announced that HarperCollins signed four young adult novels based on Emily the Strange.

Four young adult novels were published between 2009 and 2013 through HarperCollins' children imprint branch. All were written by Rob Reger and Jessica Gruner and illustrated by Reger and Buzz Parker.

The first novel, Emily the Strange: The Lost Days was written in a diary format. Rob Reger, co-author and creator of the character, said the book mapped new territory inside the mind of his popular character. "In the past, it's been us describing her," he says. "This is the first time anybody gets to hear how she talks to herself and her cats."

Young Adult Novel Series
Title	Release date	Pages	ISBN
Emily the Strange: The Lost Days	June 2009	264	9780061912382
Emily the Strange: Stranger and Stranger	November 2010	272	9780061452345
Emily the Strange: Dark Times	December 2011	248	9780061452376
Emily the Strange: Piece of Mind	March 2013	288	9780061452406

== Merchandising ==
The Emily the Strange franchise has a considerable merchandising catalog, including clothing, stationery, stickers and fashion accessories. All of the products feature Emily's distinctive appearance and frequently feature one of her cynical sayings such as "Get Lost," "Be All You Can't Be," or "Wish You Weren't Here".

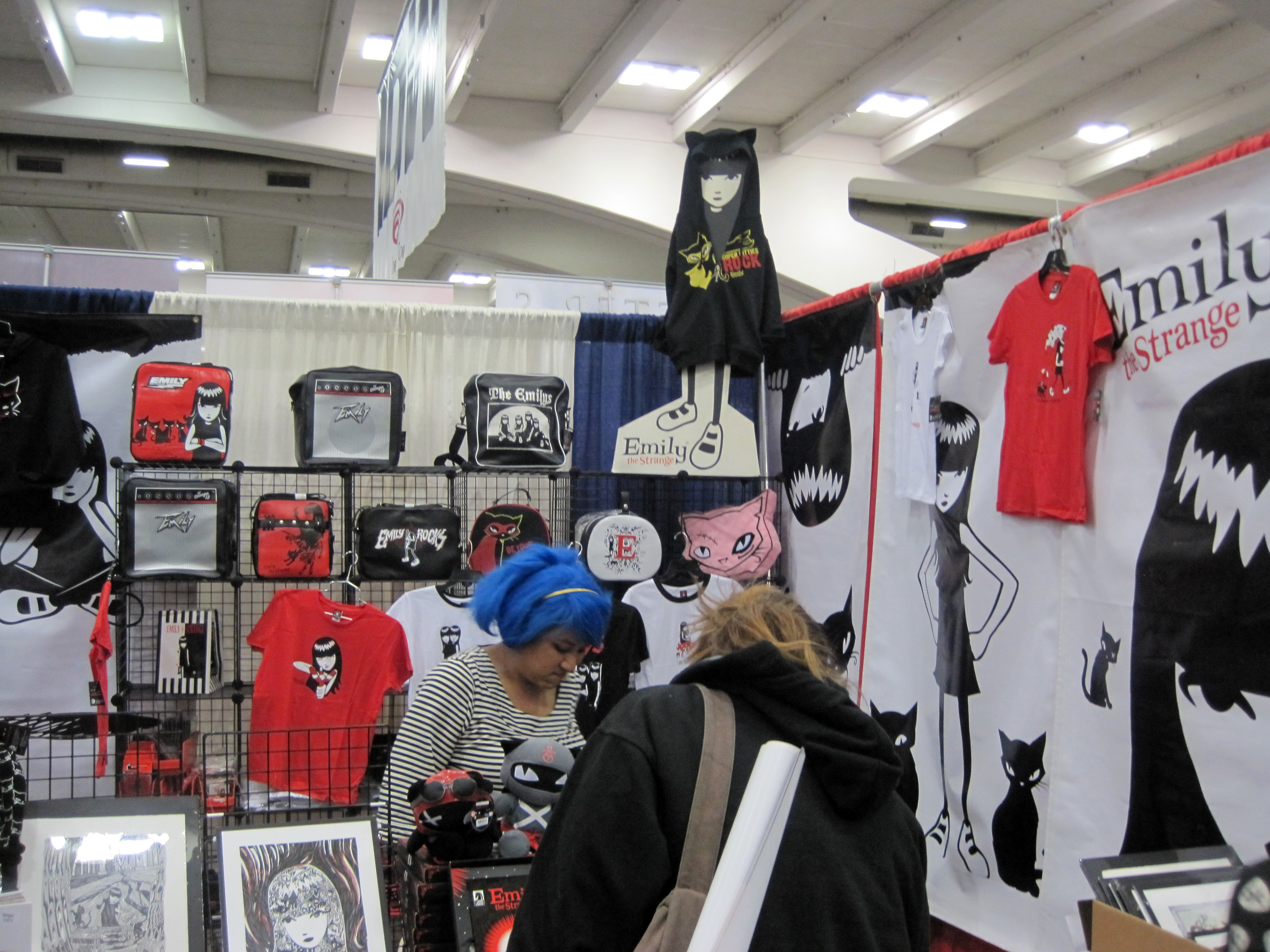
Emily the Strange booth at WonderCon 2010

As of 2008, Cosmic Debris had opened at least four Emily the Strange flagship stores, with locations in Athens, Hong Kong, Thailand, and Taiwan.

In 2005, the company partnered with British punk rock band The Damned, in the release and artwork for their single Little Miss Disaster. Other co-branding alliances and partnerships have included Jones Soda, Gibson Guitars, Zippo, and Manic Panic.

In July/August 2003 V magazine ran a double page spread of clothing inspired by the character, created by Chanel, Gautier, Helmut Lang, Marc Jacobs, and others. Emily has been shown in Vanilla Sky and on MADtv. Celebrities including Julia Roberts, Britney Spears, and Björk have all worn the brand. Epiphone has created an Emily the Strange-themed SG guitar, based on an Epiphone G-310, with a bolt-on neck, customized Emily the Strange graphics, and a special strap.

Since 2010, Emily the Strange apparel is manufactured and distributed by Italian company Pier Spa.

== In other media ==
Rob Reger designed and included the Emily the Strange cartoon in a 12-page foldout booklet for the album BatBox by Miss Kittin in 2008.

There have been several attempts at an Emily the Strange movie. In 2005, Fox Animation hired Matthew Weiss to write "Emily the Strange", a then-planned live action/animated feature film. As of 2008, Dark Horse Entertainment was looking for a director and studio for an Emily the Strange movie. In September 2010, Universal Pictures acquired the rights to the comic, and the actress Chloë Grace Moretz was cast in the role of Emily. The following August, Universal hired Melisa Wallack, who wrote the script for what would become Mirror Mirror, to write the script, then in 2013 Kealan O'Rourke was brought in to rewrite it. By December 2016, Universal had abandoned the project, and Dark Horse Entertainment and Amazon Studios were in negotiations to make an animated film.

In October 2024, Warner Bros. Pictures Animation and Bad Robot announced their collaboration on a full-length animated feature based on Emily the Strange. The film's screenplay is being developed by Pamela Ribon, as Bad Robot will produce the film, with Reger serving as executive producer alongside Trevor Duke-Moretz.

== Cats ==
Emily is usually shown accompanied by four black cats. Sabbath, the newest cat to join the Strange family, is usually identified by a tear on one of his ears and one bent whisker. Miles, the most artistic cat of the group and also the fastest, is identified by his pointy ears, X-mark over his right eye and two pointy whiskers. Nee Chee, the thinker of the group (also known as the schemer), is identified by the black and white stripes on his tail caused by a chemical spill, as well as three whiskers. Mystery, the leader of the group and the only female of the four cats, seems to be the closest to Emily, and therefore thought to be the cat that has been with Emily the longest. Mystery is identified by the star on her collar, one curly whisker and occasionally a star on her left eye.

== Character origin controversy ==
Side by side comparison of Rosamond from Nate the Great (left) and Emily the Strange (right).

The very first Emily the Strange illustration dates from 1991, but the 1978 children's book Nate the Great Goes Undercover features a very similar illustration of a young girl named Rosamond. She also has long black hair and is frequently accompanied by her black cats. When Rosamond is introduced she wears a short dress and white Mary Jane shoes, similar to Emily, and in a similar pose.

This illustration is accompanied by the text, "Rosamond did not look hungry or sleepy. She looked like she always looks. Strange." The first Emily the Strange design by Cosmic Debris says: "Emily did not look tired or happy. She looked like she always looks. Strange."

When Rosamond's creators, Marjorie Sharmat and Marc Simont, allegedly began contacting companies who had contracts related to Emily the Strange and urged them to drop their relationships with Cosmic Debris, Cosmic Debris sued Sharmat and Simont. Sharmat and Simont counter-sued. "Emily the Strange, like Rosamond, is a young girl in a short dress, black tights, and Mary Jane shoes. Emily, like Rosamond, has long dark hair with square-cut bangs. Emily, like Rosamond, is typically attended by four black cats. Emily, like Rosamond, is described as being strange and has a fascination with dark themes," alleged the complaint.

Cosmic Debris contended that Emily and Rosamond both drew from a tradition of similar characters including Vampira and Wednesday Addams, and argued that while the text of the initial Emily illustration was nearly identical with Sharmat's text, that illustration had been withdrawn in 1998 and the statute of limitations had therefore run out.

On August 12, 2009, the creator of Emily the Strange and the creators of Nate the Great jointly announced an agreement resolving all disputes between them. Each side agreed to give up all claims against the other as part of their settlement. "We recognize that Emily and Rosamond are both unique and original characters, and we are pleased that we were able to resolve this dispute," said Marjorie Sharmat and Marc Simont. "We wish Rob, Cosmic Debris, Emily and her fans all the very best."
