= 1982 (Miss Kittin & The Hacker song) =

Single by Miss Kittin & The Hacker

from the EP Champagne
- Released: 1997
- Genre: Electroclash, tech house
- Label: International DeeJay Gigolo
- Songwriters: Caroline Hervé, Michel Amato
- Producers: Caroline Hervé, Michel Amato

Miss Kittin singles chronology
"1982" (1997)	"The Vogue" (2000)

Music video
- "1982" on YouTube

"1982" is a song by French recording duo Miss Kittin & The Hacker. It is the first single from the EP Champagne (1997) and became one of the first anthems of the electroclash scene. It was later included on the duo's debut studio album First Album (2001), and has been remixed by Vitalic and Anthony Rother.

== Composition ==
"1982" is credited as an electroclash and tech house song. The lyrics reference Visage's "Fade to Gray", New Order’s "Blue Monday", Kraftwerk's "The Robots" and "The Man-Machine", Depeche Mode’s "Just Can't Get Enough", Soft Cell’s "Tainted Love", and Telex’s "Moskow Diskow."

== Critical reception ==
Richard Moroder Juzwiak of Stylus Magazine described the song as one of the first songs of the electroclash genre, further noting, "Kittin lampoons the scene as she creates it, and shows love for those without whom, electroclash wouldn’t be possible."

== Cultural impact ==
In 1998, the song was featured on the compilation album Just the Best 3/98 by Ariola Records, which charted at number two on both the Austrian Albums Chart and the Swiss Albums Chart. Later that year, the song was also featured on the compilation album Love Parade 1998 - One World One Future by Low Spirit, which charted at number nine on the Austrian Albums Chart and at number four on the Swiss Albums Chart. In 2002, the song was included on compilation album Ultra.80's vs Electro by Ultra Records.

== Live performances ==
Miss Kittin performed "1982" live at the Sónar festival. She also included it on her album Live at Sónar.

== Track listings ==
- German EP

A1. "Gigolo Intro" - 1:52
A2. "Frank Sinatra" - 3:51
A3. "The Grey Area" - 5:16
B1. "1982" - 5:17
B2. "Gratin Dauphinois" - 3:31
B3. "Gigolo Outro" - 2:02
B4. "Dirty Talk" - 2:05

- German (Anthony Rother) Vinyl, 12-inch single

A1. "1982 (Anthony Rother 2005 Remix)"-

- Italian Vinyl, 12-inch single

A1. "1982 (Club Mix)" - 5:17
A2. "1982 (Radio Edit)" - 3:05
B1. "Frank Sinatra" - 4:00
B2. "Gigolo Intro" - 1:53
