= BatBox =

Studio album by Miss Kittin
- Released: 4 February 2008
- Genre: Electronica; electroclash; dance
- Length: 51:40
- Label: Nobody's Bizzness
- Producer: Miss Kittin; Pascal Gabriel

Miss Kittin chronology
A Bugged Out Mix (2006)	BatBox (2008)	Two (2009)

Singles from BatBox
- 1. "Kittin Is High" Released: 30 November 2007; 2. "Grace" Released: 20 June 2008

BatBox is the second solo studio album by French singer and DJ Miss Kittin, released on 4 February 2008 on her own label, Nobody's Bizzness. It was co-written and produced with Pascal Gabriel. The music combines elements of techno and electro and, as Miss Kittin describes it, "a flirtation with Goth culture."

== Background and development ==
For Batbox, Miss Kittin teamed up with producer Pascal Gabriel, who had previously worked with Kylie Minogue, Boy George and Sophie Ellis-Bextor. The album was recorded in Pascal's studio in London over several months in 2007. Of the title, Miss Kittin stated, "BatBox is a redemption. Let the bats in my head fly out. I was saying goodbye to old ghosts."

== Composition ==
Musically, the album draws influences from electropop and Detroit techno, and fellow electroclash artists such as Chicks on Speed and Ellen Allien.

== Release and artwork ==
The CD booklet and cover art were designed by Rob Reger, the creator of Emily the Strange. Miss Kittin met Reger after performing a DJ gig in San Francisco.

== Promotion ==
In 2008, "Barefoot Tonight" was used in the American comedy-drama television series Entourage, in the episode "First Class Jerk".

== Singles ==
"Kittin Is High" was released as the album's lead single commercially worldwide on 30 November 2007. Rob Reger designed limited-edition artwork for the vinyl single cover.

"Grace" was released as the album's second and final single on 20 June 2008; it included remixes by Martinez and Sleeparchive.

== Critical reception ==
Professional ratings
Review scores
Source	Rating
AllMusic	4/5 stars
The Guardian	4/5 stars
PopMatters	7/10
Resident Advisor	2/5
URB	2.5/5 stars
XLR8R	6/10

Jason Lymangrover, writing for AllMusic, commented, "As she emerges from the broken cocoon of Detroit and German techno influences into a unique artist of her own – one who is slightly experimental but never lacking a head-bobbing hook – it's hard to argue when she quips, 'Frenchies do it better.'" John Burgess from The Guardian stated, "Her charismatic approach made her a major electroclash figure, and she has sustained her cult status. This is unlikely to change, despite a more pop approach for Batbox [...] The music remains niche, industrial and Teutonic, over which Hervé delivers idiosyncratic observations on her life and gothic pursuits." Rob Woo of Exclaim! wrote, "The production work is exceptional, with a greater depth of sounds and textures put into the beats and synths, the influences seemingly drawn from the best electro, tech and progressive of the last few years." Quentin B. Huff of PopMatters noted that the album "could have been bigger, brasher, and bolder. But, all things considered, it still amounts to a full load of goodies and a heck of a ride."

Conversely, Resident Advisor's Stéphane Girard said that Miss Kittin "occupies an ungraceful and uncomfortable middle ground between Chicks on Speed and Ellen Allien, and BatBox, unfortunately, won't really do anything to change that nor rally anyone to her solo career's cause. URB felt that "[a]s a concept the album fails miserably, but taken as individual tracks there are some that transcend, the brooding 'Lightmaker' or the nicely melodic DJ friendly track 'Playmate of the Century.'" In addition, Luciana Lopez of XLR8R opined, "Even the glossy, high-quality production can't give this album the energy to rise above the middling bar it sets for itself."

== Track listing ==
All lyrics are written by Caroline Hervé and Pascal Gabriel

No.	Title	Length
1.	"Kittin Is High"	3:51
2.	"BatBox"	3:20
3.	"Grace"	3:19
4.	"Solidasarockstar"	3:56
5.	"Barefoot Tonight"	3:03
6.	"Play Me a Tape"	4:08
7.	"Pollution of the Mind"	5:16
8.	"Wash N Dry"	4:15
9.	"Metalhead"	5:23
10.	"Machine Joy"	3:32
11.	"Sunset Strip"	3:02
12.	"Playmate of the Century"	4:04
13.	"Lightmaker"	4:31
Total length:		51:40

iTunes Store bonus track
No.	Title	Length
14.	"Mother Star"	3:37
Total length:		55:17

== Personnel ==
Credits adapted from the liner notes of BatBox.

- Miss Kittin – production
- Pascal Gabriel – production
- Mike Marsh – mastering at The Exchange (London)
- Rob Reger – artwork, design

== Charts ==
Chart performance for BatBox
Chart (2008)	Peak position
Belgian Albums (Ultratop Flanders)	91
Belgian Alternative Albums (Ultratop Flanders)	48
Belgian Albums (Ultratop Wallonia)	84
French Albums (SNEP)	75
