= Dirty Talk (Klein + M.B.O. song) =

Single by Klein + M.B.O.

from the album First
- Released: 1982
- Genre: Italo disco
- Label: Zanza; 25 West
- Songwriters: Mario Boncaldo; Tony Carrasco

Klein + M.B.O. singles chronology
"Dirty Talk" (1982)	"More Dirty Talk" (1982)

"Dirty Talk" is the debut single by Klein + M.B.O., released in 1982. It is from their debut studio album, De-Ja-Vu (later re-released as First).

== Critical reception ==
Slant Magazine placed "Dirty Talk" at number 67 on its 100 Greatest Dance Songs, commenting "that the lack of effective sex banter doesn't at all hinder 1982's 'Dirty Talk' is a testament to the wonderfully nonsensical charms of Italo disco. [...] The percolating rhythms, though, were nothing to laugh at—that tubular bassline sounds suspiciously like a 303, and even if it wasn't, 'Dirty Talk' provided more than a few footsteps to house."

Pitchfork Media included the song on The Pitchfork 500: Our Guide to the Greatest Songs from Punk to the Present.

Italian writer Rocco Bargioni in his book In Pista! says "I’ll just throw this out there: in my opinion, if there’s still anyone who thinks that Italian electronic music has never meant anything on the world stage, they certainly don’t know that one of the very first seminal tracks for Chicago house (with all the nuances that the birth of such an important genre might entail) was released by a Milan-based label [...] The trick is to think of it as listening to house music in its embryonic stage. We also listen to music for cultural enrichment".

== Cover versions ==
French recording duo Miss Kittin & The Hacker covered "Dirty Talk" for their 1998 EP Champagne, and also included the song as a b-side for their single "1982".

== Cultural impact ==
The song's arrangement was later used in the 1983 song "Blue Monday" by New Order. In 2005, "Dirty Talk" was included on the compilation album Back to Mine: Pet Shop Boys by the Pet Shop Boys. In 2007, "Dirty Talk" was included on the compilation album Back to Mine: Röyksopp by Röyksopp, which charted at number 24 on the Norwegian Albums Chart. Timbaland used an uncredited sample of the song "Dirty Talk" on the song "Bounce" from his album Shock Value.

== Charts ==
Chart (1982)	Peak position
US Hot Dance Club Songs	14
