= Grace (Miss Kittin song) =

Single by Miss Kittin

from the album BatBox
- Released: 20 June 2008
- Recorded: 2008
- Genre: Electronica, electroclash
- Length: 3:23
- Label: Nobody's Bizzness
- Songwriter(s): Caroline Hervé, Pascal Gabriel
- Producer(s): Caroline Hervé, Pascal Gabriel

Miss Kittin singles chronology
"Kittin Is High" (2007)	"Grace" (2008)	"PPPO" (2009)

"Grace" is a song by French recording artist Miss Kittin. It is the second and final single from her fourth studio album BatBox (2008). Co-written and produced by Pascal Gabriel, it is composed as an electropop love song.

== Critical reception ==
Quentin B. Huff of Resident Advisor commented that the song too effectively follows the pattern of "talk-rap over tight beats and haunting synthesizers."

== Cultural impact ==
In 2008, the song was featured on the compilation album Switch 12 by PIAS, which charted at number four on the Belgian (Flanders) Compilation Albums Chart.

== Track listing ==
1. "Grace (Sleeparchive Remix)" - 6:18
2. "Grace (Original)" - 3:23
3. "Grace (Martinez Bass In Your Face Mix)" - 9:35
