= Intimités =

EP by Miss Kittin & The Hacker
- Released: May 14, 1999
- Genre: Electroclash, electronica, electropop, dance, synthpop, techno
- Label: International DeeJay Gigolo Records
- Producer: Caroline Hervé, Michel Amato

Miss Kittin chronology
Champagne (1998)	Intimités (1999)	Or (2001)

The Hacker chronology
A Strange Day (1999)	Intimités (1999)	Methods of Force (2000)

Intimités is the second EP by Miss Kittin & The Hacker. An electroclash record, it was released in 1999 on International DeeJay Gigolo Records.

== Track listing ==
All lyrics are written by Miss Kittin & The Hacker, except where otherwise noted

No.	Title	Writer(s)	Length
1.	"Kittin Intro"
2.	"Uno"
3.	"Sweet Dreams"	Annie Lennox, David A. Stewart
4.	"Flexibility (A Tribute To J.M. Wicker)"
5.	"The Hacker Outro"
