= DJ Rush =

American DJ (born 1970)

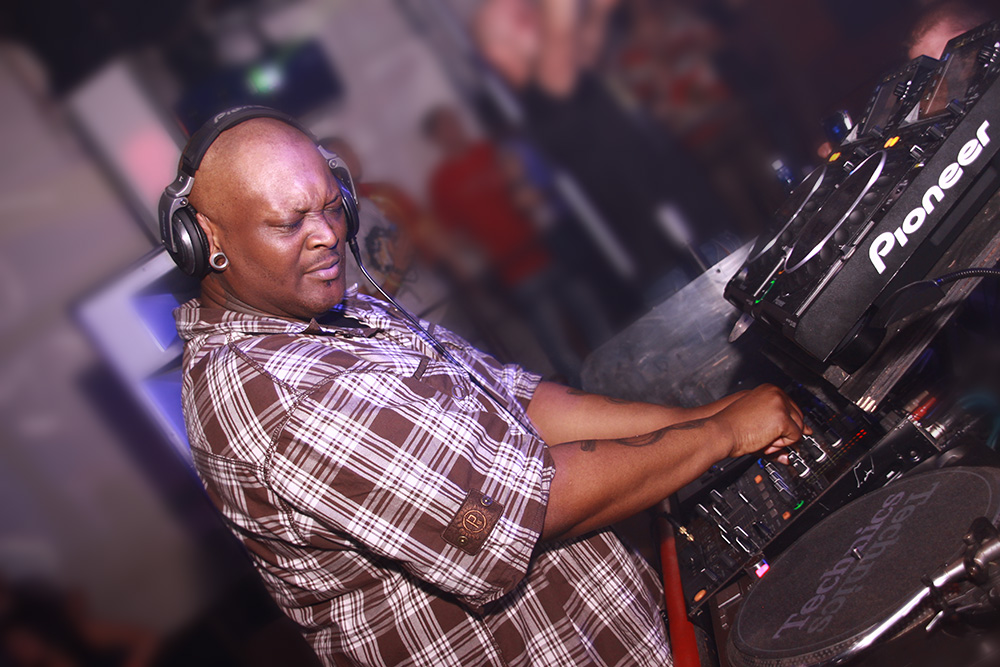
- DJ Rush performing in a German club in 2010

Background information
- Also known as: Major Rush, Russian Roulette, Drum Major
- Born: Isaiah Major; January 9, 1970 (age 56); Chicago, Illinois, United States
- Genres: Techno, hard techno, house, disco
- Occupations: DJ, musician, singer, record producer
- Instruments: Vocals, turntable, keyboards
- Years active: 1989–present
- Labels: Kne'Deep, Trax Records|Trax, Force Inc. Music Works, Omnisounds, Pro-Jex, Saber Records|Saber, Dance Mania (record label)|Dance Mania, Relief Records|Relief, Cosmic Records|Cosmic, Circuit Records, Djax-Up-Beats, Mental Groove Records, V-Records Berlin, High Octane Recordings, Basic Beat Recordings, Predicaments, Session Recordings, Utils (record label)|Utils, Modular Music Channel, Terminal M, Hörspielmusik, T:Classixx, Pounding Grooves Remixed, INEX Music Works, Highball Music, Jackstar Recordings, Beatdisaster Records, Bitshift Music, Equator (record label)|Equator, Combat Skill, Cause Records, Truth Tracks, BEK Audio
- Website: djrush.net

Isaiah Major (born January 9, 1970) best known as DJ Rush, is an American musician, DJ and record producer of electronic music, who was active in the early Chicago techno scene.

== Early life ==
Isaiah Major was born in Chicago, Illinois, United States, growing up on the south side of the city and DJing from an early age. Isaiah finished his degree in Computer Operations, Anger Management and won several first-place awards in Art competitions.

== Career ==
In the growing House scene of Chicago, DJ Rush quickly rose to prominence in the electronic music genre. He made his first appearances as a DJ in the Chicago clubs Music Box, the Powerhouse and the Warehouse where he played his sets for up to ten hours. He also began producing. In 1989 he began running a party called Gaucho out of a friends garage. Gaucho became one of the cities most popular parties in the House scene, birthing dance crew battles at house parties across the city.

In 1991 DJ Rush released his first single ("Knee Deep") on the label Trax Records. He began to gain ground in London and Berlin. In 1996 he moved to Berlin, becoming part of the progressive and creative techno scene that had gathered momentum after the fall of the Berlin Wall.

In 1998 DJ Rush successfully had a Europe-wide breakthrough with the record "Motherfucking Bass". It was widely regarded as one of the "club hymns" of that year. Following this success he teamed up with Tina Panitzke to start the booking agency and record label Kne'Deep in Berlin. In 2001 he displaced Jeff Mills as the Reader's Choice for most popular DJ in Groove-Magazine (a German magazine for electronic music released since 1989).

DJ Rush began performing in Portugal in the late 1990s. After travelling there regularly for work he fell in love with it, leaving Berlin to move to the Algarve in around 2016.

His production style over time embraced a harder more minimal style, placing him within the genre of hard techno, however DJ Rush has referred to his musical style as 'Hard Energy', first firmly rooted in house music and now combining elements of many genres including jazz, disco and soul. He sometimes DJ's and MC's simultaneously as a unique way to entertain the crowd. DJ Rush is known for his unique sense of style – being 6 ft 6 in (1.98 m) tall and often performing in platforms and extravagant costumes, citing Grace Jones and Missy Elliott amongst his inspirations.

=== Performances ===
DJ Rush is a well-known DJ in the European techno scene, having played in Techno BAM (Barcelona), Barcelona de Noche (Barcelona), Sala del Cel (Girona), Rachdingue (Vilajuïga), I Love Techno (Ghent), Tresor (Berlin), Love Parade (Berlin), Palazzo (Bingen), Dolnov (Lukavac, BiH), La Real (Oviedo), Florida 135 (Fraga), Hafentunnel (Erfurt), Awakenings (Amsterdam), Tomorrowland (Boom) and Sziget Fesztivál (Budapest). He continues to perform internationally.

== Discography ==
=== Albums ===
Year	Title	Label
1996	Klub Kids	Trax Records
1996	Rush Rules	Trax Records
1996	Doing It To Death	Force Inc. Music Works
2000	97/99 Motherfuckin' Tracks	Omnisounds
2000	Shall We Dance?	Pro-Jex

=== Singles and EPs ===
Year	Title	Label
1991	Knee Deep	Saber Records
1991	Childs Play	Dance Mania
1995	Returns	Dance Mania
1995	Show Me A Man	Relief Records
1995	Drum Major E.P.	Force Inc. Music Works
1996	The Vicious E.P.	Force Inc. Music Works
1996	Mind Games EP	Cosmic Records
1996	The Flex	Kne' Deep
1996	Get Funky	Circuit Records
1996	Punch It	Djax-Up-Beats
1997	Rhythm, Drums & Style	Force Inc. Music Works
1997	Ooo La La	Mental Groove Records
1997	DJ Rush & Nerk – The 8 N 9 EP	V-Records Berlin
1997	The Breaks E.P.	Pro-Jex
1997	EP	Relief Records
1997	Robo' Tripp'n	Force Inc. Music Works
1997	Maniac	Djax-Up-Beats
1998	The Bomb	High Octane Recordings
1998	Spitball EP	Pro-Jex
1998	Remixes Part 2	Mental Groove Records
1998	Remixes Part 1	Basic Beat Recordings
1998	DJ Rush vs Paul Langley – Analog Showbiz EP	Predicaments
1998	Lesson I	Force Inc. Music Works
1998	Traks Couture	Djax-Up-Beats
1998	Marathon Man	Djax-Up-Beats
1998	Remixes Part 1	Mental Groove Records
1998	Homecoming EP	High Octane Recordings
1999	Freaks on Hubbard Remixes	Pro-Jex
1999	Session	Session Recordings
1999	Feeling Lik A Woman	High Octane Recordings
1999	One Two Zero	Pro-Jex
1999	Lesson II	Force Inc. Music Works
1999	My Favorite Things	Utils (record label)
1999	Swingin' Da Drums	Djax-Up-Beats
1999	Boomerang EP	High Octane Recordings
2000	Look And See (Remixes)	Pro-Jex
2000	Dawn of the Recent	Modular Music Channel
2000	Lollipop	Terminal M
2000	Jack Your Body EP	Hörspielmusik
2000	Breakthrough	Djax-Up-Beats
2001	Get on Down	Pro-Jex
2001	Motherfucking Bass	T:Classixx
2001	Club Freaks	Djax-Up-Beats
2001	Mental Problems	Djax-Up-Beats
2002	Get on Up Remix E.P.	Pro-Jex
2002	DJ Rush vs. Paul Langley – Guestlist Superstars E.P.	Predicaments
2002	Pounding Grooves / DJ Rush – Pounding Grooves Remixed 01-11	Pounding Grooves Remixed
2002	Going Back	INEX Music Works
2002	Highballin' EP	Highball Music
2003	Whip Raff	Trax Records
2003	Ghetto Fabulous	Jackstar Recordings
2003	My Palazzo	Beatdisaster Records
2003	The Family (Remixes)	Djax-Up-Beats
2003	Ladies EP	Djax-Up-Beats
2003	Partytime E.P.	Terminal M
2003	Djax-Up-Beat (Remixes)	Djax-Up-Beats
2003	Club Freaks (Remixes)	Djax-Up-Beats
2003	Let's Change	Pro-Jex
2003	The Rebirth EP	Utils (record label)
2003	Heart And Soul EP	Pro-Jex
2004	DJ Rush 'n Eric Sneo – I Control The Base / Beatboxx	T:Classixx
2004	Funk U Up	Pro-Jex
2005	My Palazzo (Remixes)	Beatdisaster Records
2005	Yeah It's Me	Djax-Up-Beats
2005	DJ Rush & Robert Natus – For The Kidz	Bitshift Music
2006	Heavy in Fashion EP	Equator (record label)
2006	Pussy Pop'n	Djax-Up-Beats
2006	Amazon Farewell... The Mixes	Dark House Music
2007	DJ Rush / Alex Kvitta – Two of a Kind E.P.	Kne' Deep
2007	DJ Rush vs. DJ Ocram – The Golden X EP	Combat Skill
2009	Major Damage E.P.	Cause Records
2009	You Better Ask Somebody EP	Kne' Deep
2010	DJ Rush Vs Bruce (17) – Rhythm Composers EP	Kne' Deep
2010	Rhythm, Juicy & Drum EP	Kne' Deep
2012	DJ Rush / J. Fernandes / Huma-Noyd – United!	Kne' Deep
2012	DJ Rush & Hirte* – Evil EP	Truth Tracks
2013	She's Fine (Gary Beck Remix)	BEK Audio
2013	J. Fernandes / DJ Rush – Jaula EP	Kne' Deep
2014	The Evidence EP	Kne' Deep
2014	Major Power EP	Kne' Deep
2015	Fun And Music EP	Kne' Deep
2016	Remembering My Roots EP	Kne' Deep
Unknown	Boomerang Remix EP	Not on Label

=== DJ Mixes ===
Year	Title	Label
1999	Rauschen 14	Force Inc. Music Works
2001	Marco Remus / DJ Rush – Essential Underground Vol. 02: Berlin / Chicago	DJ-sets.com
2002	U60311 Compilation Techno Division Vol. 2	V2 Records, Inc.
2004	Palazzo Volume Three	T:Classixx
2004	Ekspozicija Ena : Meet Me	Explicit Musick
2007	Felix Kröcher & DJ Rush – U60311 Compilation Techno Division Vol. 6	V2 Records, Inc.
2008	Time Warp Compilation 08	Time Warp
2009	DJ Rush / PET Duo – Ekspozicija 10: Deep, Hard & Dirty	Explicit Musick
Unknown	Relentless	Sole Unlimited
