= Calling from the Stars =

Studio album by Miss Kittin
- Released: 19 April 2013
- Length: 105:22
- Label: Nobody's Bizzness; wSphere
- Producer: Miss Kittin

Miss Kittin chronology
| Two (2009) | Calling from the Stars (2013) | Cosmos (2018) |

Singles from Calling from the Stars
- 1. "Life Is My Teacher" Released: 10 December 2012; 2. "Bassline"/"Come into My House" Released: 4 February 2013; 3. "What to Wear" Released: 24 June 2013; 4. "Maneki Neko" Released: 18 November 2013

Professional ratings
Aggregate scores
| Source | Rating |
|---|---|
| Metacritic | 75/100 |
Review scores
| Source | Rating |
| PopMatters | 7/10 |

Calling from the Stars is the third solo studio album by French singer and DJ Miss Kittin. It was released on 19 April 2013 by Nobody's Bizzness and wSphere.

== Track listing ==
All tracks are written by Miss Kittin, except where noted

Disc one
| No. | Title | Writer(s) | Length |
|---|---|---|---|
| 1. | "Flash Forward" | | 4:49 |
| 2. | "Come into My House" | | 6:11 |
| 3. | "Bassline" | Miss Kittin; Pascal Gabriel | 3:36 |
| 4. | "Calling from the Stars" | Miss Kittin; Gesaffelstein | 4:45 |
| 5. | "Life Is My Teacher" | | 4:27 |
| 6. | "Maneki Neko" | | 2:49 |
| 7. | "What to Wear" | | 3:34 |
| 8. | "Night of Light" | | 4:47 |
| 9. | "Tears Like Kisses" | | 3:00 |
| 10. | "Eleven" | Miss Kittin; Gabriel | 3:19 |
| 11. | "Blue Grass" | | 4:30 |
| 12. | "See You" | | 4:02 |
| 13. | "Everybody Hurts" | Bill Berry; Michael Stipe; Mike Mills; Peter Buck | 4:19 |

Disc two
| No. | Title | Length |
|---|---|---|
| 1. | "Only You" | 5:03 |
| 2. | "Cosmic Love Radiation" | 4:51 |
| 3. | "Tamarin Bay" | 6:56 |
| 4. | "Sunset Mission" | 5:38 |
| 5. | "Mind Stretching" | 4:39 |
| 6. | "Ballad of the 23rd Century" | 5:14 |
| 7. | "What You See" | 3:48 |
| 8. | "Sortie des artistes" | 2:17 |
| 9. | "Silver Lake" | 5:20 |
| 10. | "I Don't Know How to Move" | 7:28 |

iTunes Store deluxe edition bonus track
| No. | Title | Length |
|---|---|---|
| 11. | "Kittin Callin'" (30mn Mix) | 30:16 |

== Personnel ==
Credits adapted from the liner notes of Calling from the Stars.

- Miss Kittin – vocals, production
- Pascal Gabriel – co-production on "Bassline" and "Eleven"
- Gesaffelstein – co-production on "Calling from the Stars"
- Mike Marsh – mastering
- Phrank – photos
- Toan Vu-Huu – artwork

== Charts ==
Chart performance for Calling from the Stars
| Chart (2013) | Peak position |
|---|---|
| Belgian Albums (Ultratop Flanders) | 78 |
| Belgian Albums (Ultratop Wallonia) | 50 |
| French Albums (SNEP) | 98 |

== Release history ==
Release dates and formats for Calling from the Stars
| Region | Date | Format | Label | Ref(s) |
|---|---|---|---|---|
| Germany | 19 April 2013 | CD | wSphere | |
| Australia | 22 April 2013 | CD; digital download | wSphere | |
| France | 22 April 2013 | CD; digital download | Nobody's Bizzness; wSphere | |
| United Kingdom | 22 April 2013 | CD; digital download | wSphere | |
| Germany | 22 April 2013 | Digital download | wSphere | |
| United States | 22 April 2013 | Digital download | wSphere | |
| France | 29 April 2013 | LP | Nobody's Bizzness; wSphere | |
| United Kingdom | 29 April 2013 | LP | wSphere | |
| Germany | 3 May 2013 | LP | wSphere | |
| United States | 30 July 2013 | CD; LP | wSphere | |
