= Radio Caroline Volume 1 =

Compilation album by Miss Kittin
- Released: 11 December 2002 (Switzerland); 25 March 2003 (US)
- Genre: Electroclash, techno, dance
- Label: Labels (France); Mental Groove Records (Switzerland); Emperor Norton (US)
- Producer: Miss Kittin

Miss Kittin chronology
On the Road (2002)	Radio Caroline Volume 1 (2002)	I Com (2004)

Radio Caroline Volume 1 is the second DJ mix album by Miss Kittin.

== Critical reception ==
Professional ratings
Review scores
Source	Rating
AllMusic	4/5 stars
Chart	2/5 stars
Exclaim!	favorable
Miami New Times	favorable

Joshua Glazer of AllMusic said, "Hervé proves that she is a wicked DJ," and that "Radio Caroline is a far more esoteric and complicated musical place than the sleek electro-trash ghetto where Miss Kittin is usually placed."

== Track listing ==
No.	Title	Writer(s)	Artist	Length
1.	"So Get Up (Acapella)"	Ithaka Darin Pappas	Ithaka	2:07
2.	"Paz Suite 4"	Scott Herren	Delarosa & Asora	4:05
3.	"Lighter"	Alexander Polzin	Alexander Polzin	3:37
4.	"CN Tower"	Jake Fairley	Jake Fairley	2:09
5.	"Dance Boy Dance"	Arlo Bigazzi, Giampiero Bigazzi, Maurizio Dami	Alexander Robotnick	4:43
6.	"Nyckelpiga (Rytmer)"	Jesper Dahlbäck	Jesper Dahlbäck	1:25
7.	"Flutter"	Rob Brown, Sean Booth	Autechre	5:39
8.	"Hapatus"	Ilpo Väisänen, Mika Vainio, Sami Salo	Pan Sonic	1:38
9.	"Lovelee Dae (Isolée Mix)"	Blaze	Blaze	3:07
10.	"Propella Man"	Jan Wollnik, Peter Wiederroth	Redagain P & Smash J	4:07
11.	"Greyscale For Slow Building"	Conrad Black	Conrad Black	5:57
12.	"Mushrooms (Salt City Orchestra Out There Mix)"	Chris Liebing, Marshall Jefferson	Marshall Jefferson vs. Noosa Heads	6:00
13.	"Studio 6.1.22"	Dave Hill, Mark Broom	Repeat	2:53
14.	"Tab Pill Bonus"	Leo Elstob	Garden	1:15
15.	"Mathematische Modelle"	Heinrich Müller	Der Zyklus	2:55
16.	"Rappel"	Andreas Fragel	Andreas Fragel	3:32
17.	"Rainy Autumn Sunrise"	Roger van Lunteren	Roger van Lunteren	3:19
18.	"Adore"	Bernd Maus, Thilo Stolle	Maus & Stolle	5:08
19.	"Makkee"	Hawkeye, DJ Lord Wax	Walking Endustries	4:31
20.	"Flicklife (μ-Ziq Mix)"		Kinesthesia	7:03

== Charts ==
Chart (2003)	Peak position
French Albums Chart	134
