= Coco Steel & Lovebomb =

British electronic group

Coco Steel & Lovebomb are a British electronic music group. The group, composed of Chris Coco, Lene Stokes, and Craig Woodrow, were most active in the 1990s.

Early releases of their electronic dance music were on Warp Records. The single "Feel It" (1991) later appeared on compilation albums from Warp (1999), Global Underground (2006), and Ministry of Sound (2011). The single "Set Me Free!" (1994) reached number 34 on the UK Official Dance Singles Chart. The debut album It! was released in 1994.

They made "increasingly ambient flavoured dance tunes that incorporated sound effects taped on [Coco's] travels." The next three albums were released on A Man Called Adam's label Other Records: New World (1997), Sun Set (1998), and Remixed (1999). Their last, The Chillout Album, was released on Melodica Recordings in 2014.

== Personnel ==
- Chris Coco – "Coco"
- Lene Stokes – "Steel"
- Craig Woodrow – "Lovebomb"

== Discography ==
=== Albums ===
- It! (Warp, 1994)
- New World (Other, 1997)
- Sun Set (Other, 1998)
- Remixed (Other, 1999) – new tracks as well as remixes of songs from the Sun Set and New World albums
- The Chillout Album (Melodica, 2014)

=== Singles and EPs ===
- "Crucifixion Of Donny" (Instant, 1987)
- "T.S.O.E. (The Sound Of Europe)" (Instant, 1988) – EP
- "Frenzy" (Instant, 1989)
- "Feel It" (Warp; Instant, 1991)
- "Touch It" (Instant, 1991)
- "You Can't Stop The Groove (Parts 1–4)" (Warp, 1992)
- "Jet Cadett" (Rena, 1992)
- "Work It / Run Free" (Nucleus, 1993)
- "Summer Rain" (Warp, 1994)
- "Set Me Free!" (Warp, 1994) – #34 on UK Official Dance Singles Chart
- "CSL RMX EP1 (Submarine, 1996)
- "Park Central / Great Ocean Road" (Other, 1997)
- "Great Ocean Road: The House Mixes: Chris Coco with A Man Called Adam (Other, 1998)
- "Yachts" (A Man Called Adam Mix) (1999)
- "The Sunset EP" (Other, 1999)
- "The Sunset EP – Coco Steel & Lovebomb Remixed" (Other, 1999)

=== Compilation album appearances ===
- Warp 10: Influences, Classics, Remixes (Warp, 1999) – includes "Feel It"
- GU10 (Global Underground, 2006) – includes "Feel It"
- Live & Remastered (Ministry of Sound, 2011) – includes "Feel It"
- Chilled 1991–2008 – Chillout Sessions series (Ministry of Sound, 2008) includes "Yachts" by A Man Called Adam Vs. Coco Steel & Lovebomb
