= Rêves Mécaniques =

Studio album by The Hacker
- Released: 2004
- Recorded: 2003–2004
- Genre: Electroclash, electronica, dance, techno
- Label: Different

The Hacker chronology
First Album (2001)	Rêves Mécaniques (2004)	Two (2009)

Professional ratings
Review scores
Source	Rating
Allmusic	2.5/5 stars

Rêves Mécaniques is the second solo album by The Hacker. It was released in 2004 on Different. The record features guest vocalists Perspects (Le Car), Mount Sims, and Miss Kittin.

The Hacker and Miss Kittin performed the song "Masterplan" at the Sónar festival, which was included on Miss Kittin's album Live at Sónar.

== Track listing ==
No.	Title	Writer(s)	Length
1.	"Flesh & Bone" (featuring Perspects)	Amato, Clarke	6:43
2.	"Sequenced Life"	Amato	5:43
3.	"Masterplan" (featuring Miss Kittin)	Amato, Hervé	6:30
4.	"Village of the Damned"	Amato	6:44
5.	"Electronic Snowflakes"	Amato	3:38
6.	"Traces" (featuring Mount Sims)	Amato, Mount Sims	5:38
7.	"It's the Mind"	Amato	7:01
8.	"Radiation"	Amato	5:15
9.	"The Brutalist"	Amato	8:41
10.	"Sleeping Machines"	Amato	4:15

== Personnel ==
- Michel Amato - producer
- Echo Danon - vocals
- Mount Sims - vocals
- Pompon - mastering

== Charts ==
Chart (2004)	Peak position
French Albums Chart	130
