= First Album (Miss Kittin & The Hacker album) =

Studio album by Miss Kittin & the Hacker
- Released: October 2001
- Genres: Electroclash; dance; techno
- Label: International DeeJay Gigolo
- Producers: Miss Kittin; The Hacker

Miss Kittin chronology
Or (2001)	First Album (2001)	On the Road (2002)

the Hacker chronology
Intimités (1999)	First Album (2001)	Rêves Mécaniques (2004)

Singles from First Album
- 1. "1982" Released: 1998; 2. "Frank Sinatra" Released: 2000; 3. "Stock Exchange" Released: 10 February 2003; 4. "The Beach" Released: 2003

First Album is the debut studio album by French electronic music duo Miss Kittin & the Hacker, released in 2001. It includes the tracks "1982" and "Frank Sinatra", two anthems of the late-1990s electroclash scene that had been first released on the EP Champagne (1998).

== Critical reception ==
Professional ratings
Aggregate scores
Source	Rating
Metacritic	68/100
Review scores
Source	Rating
AllMusic	4/5 stars
Christgau’s Consumer Guide	(dud)
Rolling Stone	4/5 stars
Uncut	7/10
URB	3.5/5 stars

Adam Bregman from AllMusic commented, "This French-Swiss duo pumps out retro-'80s-style disco beats and silly lyrics, creating a fun, goofy, ironic vibe [...] They seem to be trying to reach over and above that generally stale genre, and they mostly succeed."

Fact placed First Album at number 92 on its "100 best: Albums of the Decade" list. Mixer placed First Album at number five on its "Best Albums of 2002" list. Muzik placed it at number 15 on its list of the "Top 30 Albums of 2001". Resident Advisor ranked the album number 94 on its list of the "Top 100 albums of the 2000s".

== Commercial performance ==
Despite not charting, First Album sold over 50,000 copies worldwide.

== Track listing ==
All lyrics are written by Miss Kittin; all music is composed by The Hacker.

No.	Title	Length
1.	"Life on MTV"	4:22
2.	"Frank Sinatra"	3:53
3.	"Walk On By"	5:04
4.	"1982"	5:17
5.	"Stock Exchange"	5:22
6.	"You and Us"	4:25
7.	"Flexibility"	6:25
8.	"L'homme dans l'ombre"	4:15
9.	"Slow Track"	2:55
10.	"Nurse"	5:13
11.	"Stripper"	4:57
12.	"DJ Song"	3:03
13.	"Walking in the Sunshine"	5:14
14.	"Frank Sinatra (2001)"	4:53
15.	"The Beach"	4:41

== Personnel ==
- Miss Kittin – vocals, vibes
- The Hacker – programming
- LeroYorel – cover
- F. Holzer – photos
