= Seelenluft =

Swiss music producer, DJ (b. 1971)

- Also known as: Silvercity-Bob
- Born: Beat Solèr; 8 July 1971 (age 55)
- Origin: Zürich, Switzerland
- Genre: Electronic dance music
- Occupations: Music producer; DJ
- Years active: 1997–present
- Labels: Klein; International DeeJay Gigolo
- Website: www.seelenluft.net

Beat Solèr (born 8 July 1971), better known by his stage name Seelenluft, is a Swiss record producer of electronic music.

== Career ==
Seelenluft is Beat Soler from Zürich. He has been playing music since he was seven. He made a number of records in the 2000s.

He signed up with Klein Records and released his first record The Rise and Fall of Silvercity Bob in 2000. Silvercity Bob is an imaginary trumpet player and the album relies heavily on Beat Soler's collection of 1950s easy listening records.

The Synchronschwimmer EP was released, in 2001, as a soundtrack for Acapulco 11, a synchronized swimming team.

Seelenluft recorded his next album Out of the Woods in Los Angeles, over a couple of months in 2002. The single "Manila" featured Michael Smith, a 12-year-old boy from Compton singing lead vocals was released in the UK by Back Yard Recordings. Influential BBC Radio 1 disc jockey Pete Tong declared it was an 'essential new tune'. The track has been featured on more than 60 compilations. It peaked at number 45 on the ARIA Charts in March 2004.

Seelenluft's third album The Way We Go for Klein Records, his fourth overall, was issued in 2004 and was preceded by the track "I Can See Clearly Now". A remix by Tiga was featured on the maxi-single.

Contributing few remixes of his own, Seelenluft's work appeared on projects by diverse artists such as electronic music duo Tipsy, dance-pop singer Almamy or alternative rock band Mauracher among others. He also composed a piece for the Tonhalle Orchestra of Zürich and worked on various film soundtracks.

An association with International DeeJay Gigolo Records started in 2007. Leading to the release of Seelenluft's Birds And Plants And Rocks And Things LP on DJ Hell's label in June 2008. "Comme Dans Un Rêve" from the album was featured in the Fall/Winter 2008/9 Haute Couture Fashion Show for Chanel.

== Discography ==
=== Albums ===
- Bellatrax (1997), Hypnotic
- The Rise and Fall of Silvercity Bob (2000), Klein Records
- Out of the Woods (2002), Klein Records
- Way We Go (2004), Klein Records
- Birds and Plants and Rocks and Things (2008), International DeeJay Gigolo Records
- Magic Never Dies (2023), Champion Bunny Recordings

=== EPs ===
- Synchronswimmer (2001), Klein Records

=== Singles ===
- "Manila" (2002), Klein Records / Back Yard Recordings
- "L.A. Woman" (2003), Klein Records
- "I Can See Clearly Now" (2004), Klein Records
- "You Came Along" (2004), Klein Records
- "Horse with No Name" (2007), International DeeJay Gigolo Records

=== Remixes ===
- Shirley Bassey - "Moonraker" (1998), Hypnotic Records
- Tipsy - "Something Tropical" (2002), Asphodel
- Sinner DC - "Piano J" (2002), Polaris Records
- Mauracher - "Noonee" (2003), Fabrique Records
- I N Fused - "Paranoid" (2003), Art Brut
- Ethan - "In My Heart" (2005), Back Yard Recordings
- Moonbootica - "June" (2005), Moonbootique Recordings
- Tim & Puma Mimi - "Namida" (2006), Alpinechic
- Almamy - "Like You Do" (2008), ModyWorks
- Electric Blanket - "My Eyes My Heart" (2008), Wankdorf Recordings
