= The Beach (song) =

Song by Miss Kittin & The Hacker

Song by Miss Kittin & The Hacker

from the album First Album
- Released: 2003
- Length: 4:41
- Label: Mental Groove Records
- Songwriter(s): Caroline Hervé, Michel Amato
- Producer(s): Caroline Hervé, Michel Amato

Miss Kittin singles chronology
"Stock Exchange" (2003)	"The Beach" (2003)	"Professional Distortion" (2004)

Music video
- "The Beach" on YouTube

"The Beach" is a song by French recording duo Miss Kittin & The Hacker from their debut album First Album (2001). Produced by the duo, it was released as the album's fourth and final single in 2003.

== Writing and inspiration ==
Lyrically, "The Beach" was written as a phone message from an old friend on vacation.

== Composition ==
"The Beach" samples the 1983 song "I Want You" by Gary Low.

== Critical reception ==
Patrick of Gullbuy commented that Miss Kittin is "no Donna Summer", yet "it's not overly disco and ends up being the more human side of that sound".

== Music video ==
Andre Garça directed a music video for "The Beach".

== Track listing ==
1. "The Beach" – 4:41
2. "Upstart" – 4:58

== Charts ==
Chart (2003)	Peak Position
Belgian Dance Chart	23

== Song usage ==
"The Beach" was included on the compilation album Where Is Here by Mental Groove Records.
