= Gautier furniture =

French furniture company

Gautier is a French furniture company specializing in office, living room and bedroom furniture.

Patrice Gautier started its operations in 1958 in France and has operated in the United States since 1982. M. Dominique Soulard is its current Chairman and Managing Director. It has three integrated manufacturing facilities in France spread over 150,000 sq m which produce 15,000 units of Gautier furniture every day.

Gautier employs a Robotic Hydro-UV production technology. Its QC process checks and tests furniture with wear tests, climate tests and safety tests.

All Gautier products are designed and made in Vendée, France.
