= Silver Screen Shower Scene =

Single by Felix da Housecat feat. Miss Kittin

from the album Kittenz and Thee Glitz
- Released: 2 May 2001
- Recorded: 2001
- Genre: Electroclash
- Length: 4:40 (Album Version); 4:00 (Radio Edit)
- Label: City Rockers
- Songwriters: D. Jenefsky, T. Lorello a.k.a. Tommie Sunshine, Felix Stallings
- Producer: Felix da Housecat

Felix da Housecat singles chronology
"Silver Screen Shower Scene" (2001)	"What Does It Feel Like?" (2001)

Miss Kittin singles chronology
"Frank Sinatra" (2000)	"Silver Screen Shower Scene" (2001)	"What Does It Feel Like?" (2001)

"Silver Screen Shower Scene" is the first single from Felix da Housecat's album Kittenz and Thee Glitz. Co-written with Dave Jenefsky a.k.a. The Hustler, T. Lorello a.k.a. Tommie Sunshine, and Felix himself, it features French electronic musician Miss Kittin on vocals. Miss Kittin included the Laurent Garnier remix on her DJ mix album On the Road. The song melody is sampled from "Passion" by The Flirts.

== Critical reception ==
Resident Advisor voted "Silver Screen Shower Scene (Thin White Duke Remix)" at #71 on its Top 100 Tracks of the 2000s.

== Cultural impact ==
"Silver Screen Shower Scene" was used in the 2005 film Kiss Kiss Bang Bang. The song was also included on the compilation album GU10. In 2003, the song was included on the compilation album As Heard on Radio Soulwax Pt. 2. In 2003 this song was included on the soundtrack of the video racing game Midnight Club 2 and in the snowboarding game SSX 3. In 2004, the song was included on the soundtrack of the game The Getaway: Black Monday.

== Cover versions ==
Afrika Bambaataa and Soulsonic Force covered the song for Big Day Out 04.

== Track listing ==
1. "Silver Screen Shower Scene" – 4:00 (Radio Edit)
2. "Silver Screen Shower Scene (Adult. Remix)" – 4:25
3. "Silver Screen Shower Scene (Thin White Duke Remix)" – 8:35

== Charts ==
Chart (2001/2002)	Peak Position
Belgium (Ultratop 50 Flanders)	34
Belgium (Ultratip Bubbling Under Wallonia)	8
Belgium Dance (Ultratop)	9
France (SNEP)	86
Netherlands (Single Top 100)	94
UK Singles (The Official Charts Company)	39
UK Dance (The Official Charts Company)	2
