= Miss Kittin =

French electronic music producer, DJ, singer, and songwriter

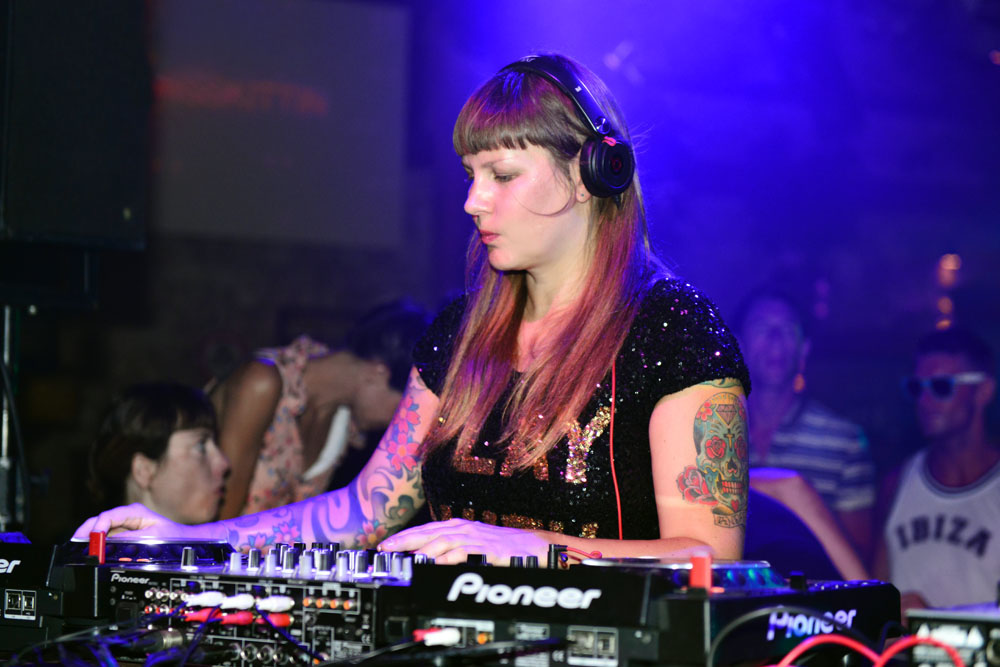
- Miss Kittin performing at Amnesia, 2012

Background information
- Born: Caroline Hervé; 16 July 1973 (age 53); Grenoble, Isère, France
- Genres: Electroclash, synthpop, hip hop, tech house
- Occupations: Singer, songwriter, musician, record producer, DJ
- Instruments: Vocals, synthesizer, keyboards
- Years active: 1994–present
- Labels: Astralwerks, EMI, International DeeJay Gigolo, Mute Records, Nobody's Bizzness, Novamute
- Website: www.misskittin.com

Caroline Hervé (born 16 July 1973), known professionally as Miss Kittin, is a French electronic music producer, DJ, singer, and songwriter. Since rising to prominence in 1998 for her singles "1982" and "Frank Sinatra" with The Hacker, she has worked with other musicians such as Chicks on Speed, Felix da Housecat and Golden Boy. She released her debut solo album I Com in 2004, a second, BatBox, in 2008, and a third, Calling from the Stars, in 2013. She achieved international popularity with the singles "Rippin Kittin" and "Silver Screen Shower Scene".

== Life and career ==
=== 1973–1994: Early life ===
Miss Kittin was born Caroline Hervé in 1973 in Grenoble, a city in the Alps, in southeastern France. Music such as Genesis, Supertramp, Miles Davis, Maria Callas, Pink Floyd and The Beatles became a prominent part of her and her parents' lives. At the age of 6, Hervé often played piano for fun at her grandparents', and reproduced melodies from the radio. Miss Kittin tried taking piano lessons but gave up after 2 years. In addition, she started practicing ballet when she was 5 years old and continued until she was 22.

After earning her high school diploma in 1990, Miss Kittin studied art, first in Marseille (1991), then in the Beaux-Arts of Grenoble to specialize in contemporary art (1993–94). She finished her graphic design program in Amiens in 1995 before starting her full-time DJ job.

=== 1995–1997: Career beginnings ===
As time progressed, Kittin found herself emulating her parents' musical tastes by developing an interest in musical genres ranging from classic, jazz, funk, and disco to English pop. Finding her niche in electronic music in 1991, Kittin raved all around the country before doing her first mix in April 1993. Her first set came one year later in 1994, at which time she started her career with Tekmics Booking Agency. When she was 22, she began DJing, spinning records in France, Moscow and Chicago with Mike Dearborn. A major break came for the producer/DJ when she received bookings for the Dragon Ball events in southern France. In 1996, she moved to Geneva, Switzerland, and joined the Mental Groove Records group. A trio of early productions on various-artists compilations were scattered throughout 1996 and 1997.

=== 1998–2003: The Hacker, First Album and Or ===
The first records she bought for DJing were Richie Hawtin's Fuse and Robert Hood's The Protein Valve. It took her three months to earn enough money at her job as a supermarket cashier to buy a secondhand pair of Technics decks, both of which she still uses. In 1997, she met DJ Hell in Marseille, who wanted her to record for his International DJ Gigolo label. In 1998, she presented him with the EP Champagne that she recorded with The Hacker. Champagne included tracks such as "1982" and "Frank Sinatra", which became anthems of the electroclash scene and underground hits in Europe. It further included a cover of the song "Dirty Talk" by Klein + M.B.O. In 1999, the duo released the EP Intimités, which included a cover of the Eurythmics' "Sweet Dreams (Are Made of This)".

Miss Kittin & The Hacker released First Album in 2001. First Album received positive reviews from contemporary critics; according to the music review aggregation of Metacritic, it garnered an average score of 68/100. The album was listed on several Best Albums of the Decade lists. Despite not charting, the album sold over 50,000 copies worldwide. Slant Magazine placed "Frank Sinatra" at number eighty-six on its 100 Greatest Dance Songs list. Other songs on the album include "Stock Exchange" and "The Beach".

While touring with The Hacker in support of their debut album, Miss Kittin met Felix da Housecat at a Swiss festival. The next day, Kittin and Felix composed "Silver Screen Shower Scene" and "Madame Hollywood" in a friend's small studio in Geneva. She also cowrote and was featured on the songs "Voicemail" and "What Does It Feel Like?" from Felix da Housecat's album Kittenz and Thee Glitz. The album received positive reviews from contemporary critics, garnering an average score of 78/100 on the music review aggregation of Metacritic. "Silver Screen Shower Scene" became one of the first electroclash songs to reach the UK Top 40, peaking at number thirty-nine. "Madame Hollywood" peaked at number nineteen on the Canadian Singles Chart. In 2001, Sven Väth featured Miss Kittin on a cover of "Je t'aime... moi non-plus", the Serge Gainsbourg song. After shooting the music video for "Je t'aime... moi non-plus", Miss Kittin decided to move to Berlin and take a job as an A&R consultant at Mute Records Germany.

In 2002, she released the techno music compilations On the Road and Radio Caroline Vol.1. Both albums received positive reviews for showcasing her talents "as a DJ rather than an electroclash diva", who "finally tears down the facade, proving that she is much more than the champagne-toasting chanteuse that her sensual accent and fashionista lyrics have always suggested."

Golden Boy first met Miss Kittin after she remixed one of his songs. In 2001, the duo released the album Or on Ladomat 2000. The single "Rippin Kittin", released in the same year, references the Misfits' song "Mommy, Can I Go Out & Kill Tonight?" from the band's album Walk Among Us. After being endorsed by Neil Tennant of the Pet Shop Boys, the single became a club success in Europe and became Miss Kittin's first No. 1 single on the UK Dance Chart. Pitchfork Media placed "Rippin Kittin" at number four-hundred thirty-five on its Top 500 Tracks of the 2000s list. In addition, Stylus Decade placed the song at number seventy-five on its Top 100 Singles of the 2000s list.

She collaborated with Chicks on Speed and sang on the songs "Shick Shaving" and "Wordy Rappinghood" from their album 99 Cents in 2003. "Wordy Rappinghood" also featured guest vocals by other female musicians such as Kevin Blechdom, Le Tigre, Adult.'s Nicola Kuperus, and Tina Weymouth of the Tom Tom Club. The song became a moderate dance hit in Europe, peaking at number five on the Belgian Dance Chart, and at number sixty-six on the UK Singles Chart.

=== 2004–2007: Solo career and I Com ===
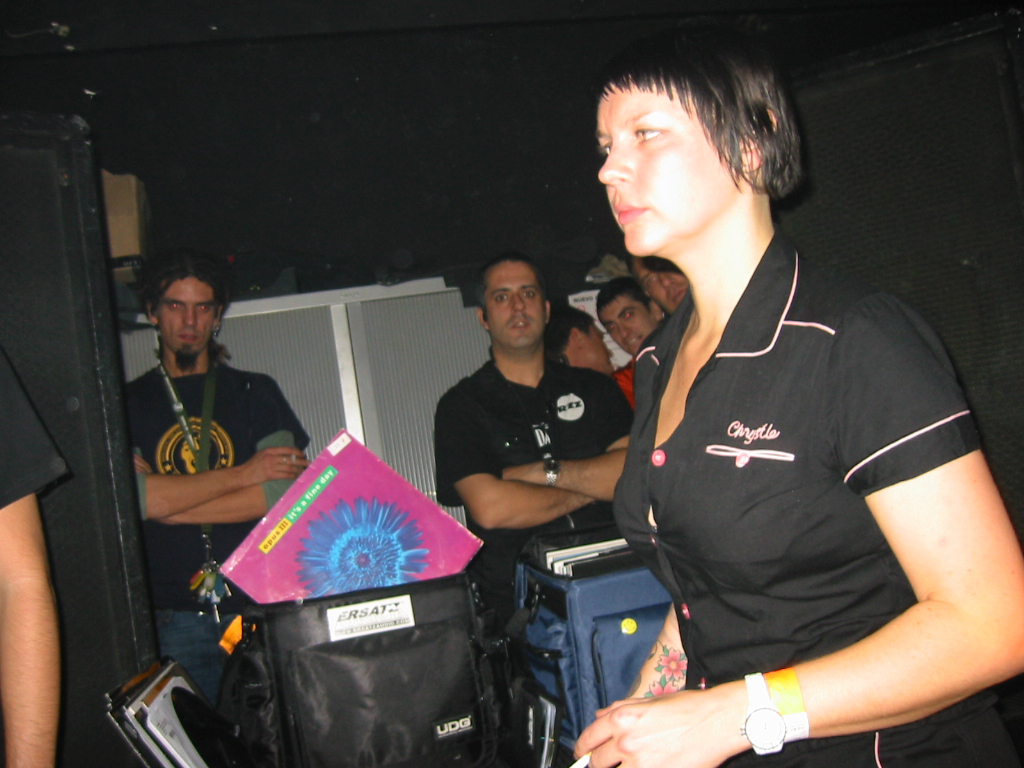
Miss Kittin at Razzmatazz in Barcelona, 2004

On 24 May 2004, Miss Kittin released her debut solo album I Com through NovaMute in the United Kingdom, and through Astralwerks in the United States. She collaborated with The Hacker, Toby Neumann and Thies Mynther for the album. Miss Kittin had met Tobi Neumann and Thies Mynther aka "Glove" after working with them on the Chicks on Speed song "Shick Shaving" and after recording lyrics for Steve Bug. The album received positive reviews from contemporary critics, earning an average score of 73/100 on the music review aggregation of Metacritic. I Com yielded three singles: "Professional Distortion", "Requiem for a Hit" and "Happy Violentine". The song "Professional Distortion" became Miss Kittin's first solo single to chart on the French Singles Chart. Several of the remixes of the three singles were later compiled and released on Miss Kittin's EP Mixing Me.

In 2004, Miss Kittin created her own label Nobody's Bizzness. The label would eventually release her albums BatBox and Two after her departure from NovaMute. She said of the label's purpose, "I created my own label 'Nobody's Bizzness' to release my finished album and keep the maximum freedom with my music." Additionally, Kittin appeared on the song "Masterplan" from The Hacker's album Rêves Mécaniques in 2004.

She released Live at Sónar in 2006, recorded at the electronic music festival Sónar in Barcelona. For Sónar, Miss Kittin provided impromptu new vocals to her established catalogue. During the festival, she was assisted by Aphex Twin, Modeselektor, Boom Bip, and The Hacker. The album was jointly released by Labels and NovaMute.

Miss Kittin also released the double-disc CD A Bugged Out Mix in 2006 through Resist Music and System Recordings. Disc One Perfect Night combines underground classics (Mike Ink), electro (Cajmere) and minimal techno (Adam Beyer) while the second disc Perfect Day is a mix of Miss Kittin's favourite post-club tracks from artists such as Wagon Christ, Monolake and Biosphere.

In 2007, Miss Kittin & The Hacker reunited to release the single "Hometown / Dimanche" through Good Life Recordings. The music video for "Hometown" was directed by Régis Brochier of 7th floor Productions.

=== 2008–2012: BatBox, Reunion with The Hacker and Two ===
After two years in the making and almost four years since her debut album I Com, Miss Kittin released her second album, BatBox on 4 February 2008, on her label Nobody's Bizzness. BatBox's thirteen original songs were composed whilst touring throughout the world. Miss Kittin described the tracks as a flirtation with Goth culture, as reflected in vocal lines such as "bat in a box / show me what you goth". Artist Rob Reger designed the cover and included his "Emily the Strange" cartoon in a 12-page foldout booklet for the album. Miss Kittin released the singles "Kittin Is High" and "Grace" to promote the album.

In 2008, Miss Kittin & The Hacker reunited as a duo, and toured throughout America and around the world, before they both started recording new songs, some of which were performed whilst touring. Two, their second album together, was released in March 2009. The album was released 8 years after their first and only full LP as a duo. Two received positive reviews from contemporary critics; according to the music review aggregation of Metacritic, it garnered an average score of 62/100. Their first single from the album "PPPO" was released in March 2009 followed by the single "1000 Dreams". Their third and final single from the album "Party in My Head" was released in June 2009. The Thieves Like Us remix of "Party in My Head" was released a free download on XLR8R's website. Miss Kittin & The Hacker also included a cover of Elvis Presley's "Suspicious Minds" on the album, for which they filmed a promotional music video directed by Régis Brochier of 7th floor Productions. "Suspicious Minds" was later featured on the downloadable for free mixtape Skull of Dreams by Little Boots.

Miss Kittin was featured on Primal Scream's cover of "Diamonds, Fur Coat, Champagne" for a limited-edition 10-inch vinyl pressing. A total of 3,000 copies were pressed and released on 30 March 2009. The song is a part of a series of Suicide covers by other musicians such as The Horrors and Lydia Lunch released on the Blast First Petite label to celebrate Suicide frontman Alan Vega's 70th birthday. Miss Kittin remixed Felix da Housecat's song "We All Wanna Be Prince" in 2009, changing the word "Prince" into "princess". She also appeared on the single "Le Flaneur" from the album Elemental Assets by Estroe in 2009. In 2010, Miss Kittin was featured on the song "DNA" from the album Ever Since by Xenia Beliayeva.

On 10 January 2011, Miss Kittin released the single "All You Need" on Mobilee Records. On 28 March, a free download of her song "Silver Lake" was released through SoundCloud to promote Soul Aid, a program to raise money for Civic Force, an emergency relief organization stationed in Kesennuma after the 2011 Tōhoku earthquake and tsunami.

=== 2013–2017: Calling from the Stars ===
Miss Kittin released Calling from the Stars on 19 April 2013. A double album with 23 new songs, it includes a cover version of R.E.M.'s "Everybody Hurts". Some of the tracks were made available prior to the album release, such as "Bassline". She also released the Track "Hide" on the Vocal Collaboration Album "Features" by Kris Menace. The Video to the Single received an Vimeo Staff Pick.

=== 2018–2021: Cosmos ===
Miss Kittin released her first concept album Cosmos under the name Kittin on 2 November 2018.

== Influences ==
Caroline has mentioned her admiration for Maurice Dantec, Serge Gainsbourg, Laurent Garnier, Daft Punk, Kompakt, Thomas Brinkmann, Sven Väth, Chicks on Speed, Madonna, Prince, Adult., Dopplereffekt, Drexciya, Fischerspooner, Rush, Felix da Housecat, Dr. Dre, Bret Easton Ellis, James Ellroy, Frank Sinatra, Mute Records, Warp Records, Cher, Boards of Canada, Andrew Weatherall, Richard D. James, Stanley Kubrick, Cabaret Voltaire, New Order, DAF, Visage, Ultravox, Fad Gadget, Front 242, Depeche Mode, Kiss, Indochine, and David Bowie.

== Discography ==
- Or (with Golden Boy) (2001)
- First Album (with The Hacker) (2001)
- I Com (2004)
- BatBox (2008)
- Two (with The Hacker) (2009)
- Calling from the Stars (2013)
- Cosmos (2018)
- Third (with The Hacker) (2022)

== Filmography ==
Film
Year	Film	Role	Notes
2009	Speaking in Code	Herself	Documentary film about electronic music.
Television appearances
Year	Title	Role	Notes
2004	Clash of Cultures	Herself	TV documentary about the electroclash music scene

== See also ==
- List of electroclash bands and artists
