= Nobody's Bizzness =

French record label

- Founded: 2004
- Founder: Miss Kittin
- Distributor(s): PIAS
- Genre: Electroclash, Electropop, Dance
- Country of origin: France
- Official website: Nobody's Bizzness website

Nobody's Bizzness is a French independent record label founded by Miss Kittin.

== History ==
Nobody's Bizzness was founded in 2004 by French recording artist Miss Kittin.

== Current Artists ==
- Miss Kittin
- The Hacker

== See also ==
- List of record labels
