= International DeeJay Gigolo Records =

Record label

- Founded: 1996; 30 years ago
- Founder: DJ Hell, DJ Upstart
- Country of origin: Germany
- Location: Munich
- Official website: gigolorecords.com

International DeeJay Gigolo Records is a German electronic music record label run by techno artist DJ Hell (real name Helmut Geier). The label was founded in Munich in 1996 by DJ Hell and DJ Upstart as an affiliate of label Disko B. It is Germany's most successful electronic music record label, specialising in electro, house and techno with 80's pop and disco influences. "Gigolo" has released records by Dave Clarke, Jeff Mills, DJ Hell, Miss Kittin, The Hacker, The Penelopes, The Advent, Dopplereffekt, Fischerspooner, Tiga, Princess Superstar and Vitalic. In particular, the label is widely credited as being the germ cell of the electroclash music genre in the late 1990s.

Gigolo's most successful release came in 2001, with Vitalic's Poney EP (which included techno favourite "La Rock 01" on the B-side). This EP was remastered and re-issued in 2006. The label also releases showcase compilations, sometimes called "We Are Gigolo", of which there are now twelve volumes. After several successful years in Munich, Hell temporarily moved the label's office to Berlin in the mid-2000s.

== Artists ==
- Amanda Lepore
- Acid Maria
- Anthony Shakir
- The Advent
- Chris Korda
- Dave Clarke
- DJ Hell
- DMX Krew
- Fat Truckers
- Fischerspooner
- Jeff Mills
- Kevin Gorman
- Linda Lamb
- Mike Perras
- Miss Kittin
- Mount Sims
- Orlando Voorn
- Princess Superstar
- Psychonauts
- Seelenluft
- The Hacker
- The Penelopes
- Tiga
- Tuxedomoon
- Vitalic
- Zombie Nation

== See also ==
- List of record labels
