= The Hacker =

French electroclash/techno producer

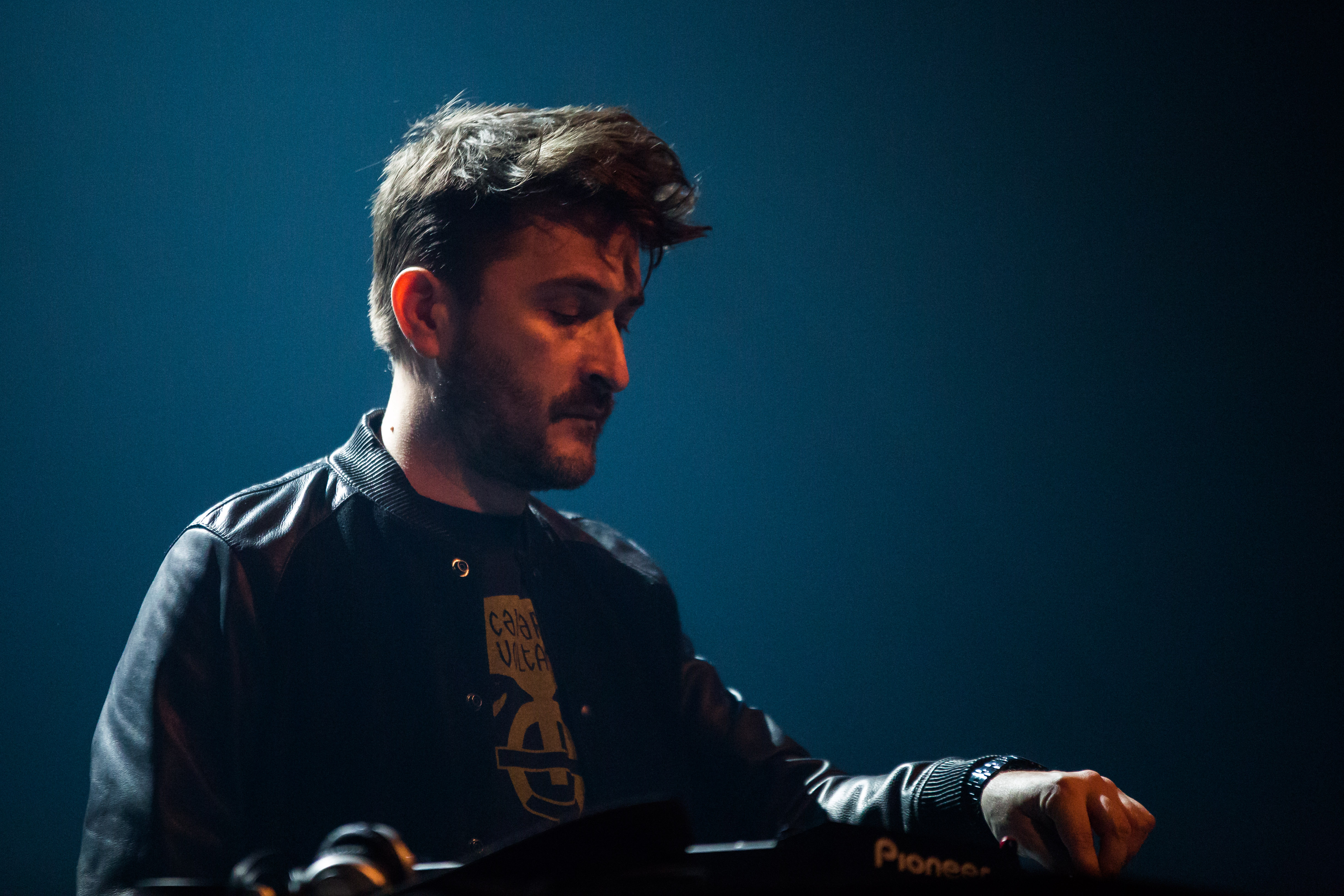
The Hacker on 13 September 2015

Michel Amato, better known by his stage name the Hacker, is a French electroclash and techno producer who has worked extensively with Miss Kittin. His work has been influenced by electronic artists like Kraftwerk, new wave artists such as The Cure and Depeche Mode, as well as the French rave scene of the early 1990s. His artist name comes from the Jeff Mills track of the same name.

== Career ==
The Hacker started making music in 1989 at the age of 17 in Grenoble, France. At the time, Duran Duran was an early influence, but he later discovered the darker side of electro through electronic body music groups like Cabaret Voltaire and D.A.F. In 1993, the Hacker took on the hardcore side of electro and released a few 12”s with Benoit Bollini under the name XMF.

In 1995, he made his own music in classic Detroit styled after Jeff Mills. His first tracks were released on the Ozone and Interface labels. Three years later, the Hacker founded his own label, Goodlife Records (named from a classic track from Inner City), with his friends Oxia and Alex Reynaud. However, he also released tracks on other labels such as "A Strange Day" on UMF and "Method of Force" on Sativae. His debut album Mélodies En Sous-Sol (spring 2000) echoes New Order and Dopplereffekt.

In the mid-1990s, the Hacker began producing electro-pop with his friend, Caroline Hervé (aka Miss Kittin). DJ Hell loved their first track "Gratin Dauphinois" and signed them to his new label International DJ Gigolo in 1997. In Germany, their success was immediate owing to the releases of the EPs Champagne in 1998 and Intimités in 1999. The Champagne EP included the tracks "1982" and "Frank Sinatra", which immediately became anthems of the electroclash scene. After the release of their First Album in 2001 they became popular worldwide. The Hacker is also sought after as a producer, and has done remixes for Marc Almond, Fischerspooner, Air, and Nitzer Ebb.

In 2002, after their U.S. tour, the Hacker and Miss Kittin decided to take a break from their collaborative projects. The Hacker took this opportunity to produce many new tracks released on vinyl, such as "The Beach" on Mental Groove and "Dance Industria" on Tiga's label Turbo. He collaborated with Kiko, Alexander Robotnick, millimetric and David Carretta, touring all over the globe as a DJ and started work on his next album.

The Hacker released his second album, Rêves Mécaniques in 2004. It became his first album to chart on the French Albums Chart, peaking at #130 and spending a total of four weeks on the chart.

In 2007, he rejoined with Miss Kittin to release the double A-side "Hometown"/"Dimanche". To celebrate his tenth anniversary as a recording artist, the Hacker released the CD/DVD set X in 2008. The compilation contains live recordings, singles and some new studio tracks.

Miss Kittin & the Hacker reunited as a duo in 2008, after a short tour of European clubs at the end of 2007, and the Hometown EP was released in June that year. Further touring followed throughout America and around the world in 2008, before they both started recording new songs, some of which were performed whilst touring. In March 2009, they released their second album Two, 8 years after their first and only full LP as a duo. The first single "1000 Dreams" was also released in March, alongside a new club single "PPPO - People Pleasure Power Objects", both taken from the new album. The reformed duo embarked on a new European tour all summer in 2008, kicking off in France in early April.

== Discography ==
=== Albums ===
- Champagne (with Miss Kittin) (1998)
- Intimités (with Miss Kittin) (1999)
- Mélodies en sous-sol (1999)
- First Album (with Miss Kittin) (2001)
- Rêves Mécaniques (2004) #130 FRA
- Two (with Miss Kittin) (2009) #102 FRA
- Love/Kraft (2014)
- Le Théâtre des opérations (2017)
- Third Album (with Miss Kittin) (2022)
