= Electroclash =

Music genre

- Other names: Synthcore; retro-electro; tech-pop; nouveau-disco
- Stylistic origins: Electro; synth-pop; new wave; post-punk; house; techno; electropop; alternative dance; Italo disco
- Cultural origins: Late 1990s, Netherlands, France, Austria, Germany (Munich) and United States (Detroit and New York)
- Derivative forms: Electro house; tech house; bloghouse

Other topics
- New rave; big beat; Madchester; electropunk; Romo

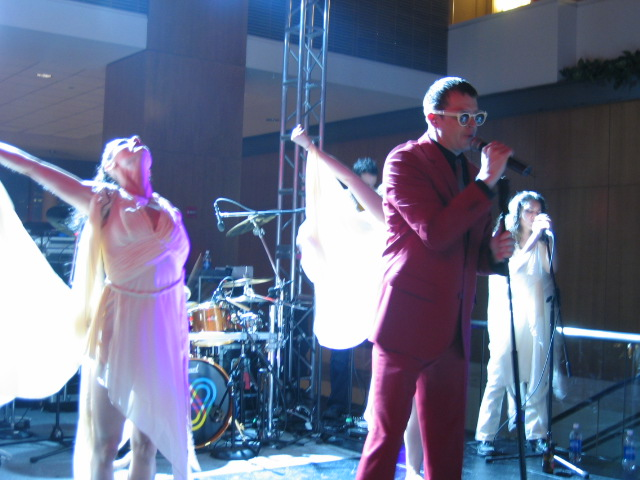
Fischerspooner, an American electroclash act

Electroclash (also known as synthcore, retro-electro, tech-pop, nouveau disco) is a genre of popular music that fuses 1980s electro, new wave and synth-pop with 1990s techno, retro-style electropop and electronic dance music. It emerged in the late 1990s and was pioneered by and associated with acts such as I-F, DJ Hell, Miss Kittin and The Hacker, and Fischerspooner.

== Terminology and characteristics ==
The term electroclash describes a musical movement that combined synthpop, techno, punk and performance art. The genre was in reaction to the rigid formulations of techno music, putting an emphasis on song writing, showmanship and a sense of humour, and was described by The Guardian as one of "the two most significant upheavals in recent dance music history". DJ Hell is widely credited as inventor and name giver of the genre, while DJ and promoter Larry Tee later popularized the term in the US by naming the Electroclash 2001 Festival in New York after it.

== History ==
=== Role of International Deejay Gigolos ===
Electroclash emerged in the late 1990s. The Munich-based label International DeeJay Gigolo Records, founded by DJ Hell, is considered the "germ cell" and "THE home" of the electroclash sound. Gigolo featured many of the early electroclash songs, such as for example Christopher Just's I'm a Disco Dancer from 1997 or Chris Korda's Save the Planet, Kill Yourself, which originally even had been released as early as 1993. Then in 1998, Gigolo released the songs "1982" and "Frank Sinatra" by French recording duo Miss Kittin & The Hacker, which were among the most successful early hits of the new genre. This was followed by the hit "Emerge" by New York duo Fischerspooner, as well as the remake of Corey Hart's "Sunglasses at Night" by Canadian duo Tiga & Zyntherius, both released on Gigolo in 2001. DJ Hell brought the artists of the new genre together on the label and acted primarily as their mentor. But also Hell's own releases like the album Munich Machine from 1998 are seen as groundbreaking for the genre Electroclash. In the widely recognized film documentary Welcome to the club! 25 years of electronic dance music by European television network Arte, Miss Kittin describes the origination of the first songs of the new style together with DJ Hell and declares him the inventor of the Electroclash genre. Since DJ Hell gathered the international artists of the new genre at Gigolo in Munich and many of them gave their first performances in the city's nightclubs, Munich is considered the city in which electroclash "was significantly co-invented, if not invented". Soon the new style of music also spread to other cities such as Berlin, London and New York.

=== Other early artists ===
Also I-F's track "Space Invaders Are Smoking Grass", released in 1998 on Disko B, with its "old-fashioned verse-chorus dynamics to burbling electro in a vocodered homage to Atari-era hi-jinks" is considered one of the pioneering tracks of the electroclash genre. Further early artists include Chicks on Speed, Peaches, Electrosexual ADULT. and Toktok vs. Soffy O with their year 2000 hit Missy Queen's Gonna Die.

During their early years, Ladytron were sometimes labeled as electroclash, but others stated that they were not entirely electroclash and they also rejected this tag themselves. Goldfrapp's albums Black Cherry (2003) and Supernature (2005) incorporated electroclash influences.

== Revival ==
=== In the U.S. ===
In the U.S., the genre gained media attention when the Electroclash Festival was held in New York in October 2001, aiming to "make a local breakthrough with this scene, presenting a select group of superstar and pioneer artists from Europe and the U.S." The Electroclash Festival returned in 2002, followed by live tours across the US and Europe in 2003 and 2004. Notable artists who performed at the festival and subsequent tours include Scissor Sisters, ADULT., Erol Alkan, Princess Superstar, Mignon, Mount Sims, Tiga and Spalding Rockwell.

=== Global resurgence ===
Around 2022, electroclash experienced a resurgence led by several prominent artists, considered the third wave of electroclash. DJ Hell launched a new electroclash tour, while Konerytmi presented a distinctive electroclash 2022 live act in a steampunk-themed environment. Norbert Thunder contributed to the revival with his Fembot Actress EP in 2022, which included the festival hit track "Groove, Style, Lights, Euphoria." Marketed as an effort to reintroduce the electroclash sound to contemporary audiences, the EP gained notable attention. Several record labels also began releasing electroclash vinyl records and EPs, including the Spanish label Veintidós Rec. and the Italian label Rapid Eye Movement Records. Swedish singer and songwriter Zara Larsson used the electroclash genre for the first single from her fifth album Midnight Sun (2025), titled "Pretty Ugly", released the same year. The song contains pop influences and blends Eurodance elements.

== Criticism ==
The electroclash label and the hype around it were fiercely criticized by some of its acclaimed protagonists in the early 2000s. For example, I-F and other artists signed an "Anti-Electroclash-Manifest", where they complained about the sellout of the style by those who would "rule the media waves" and only "sell the old freshly packaged". In 2002, Toktok vs. Soffy O. stated that when they were first asked about electroclash they just thought: "This is nothing else than what we've known for at least five years and what is now reaching the recycling peak for the third or fourth time".

== See also ==
- List of electroclash bands and artists
