= L'Etat Et Moi =

L’Etat Et Moi

Studio album by Blumfeld
- Released: August 22, 1994
- Studio: Soundgarden Tonstudio, Hamburg
- Genre: Indie rock; Hamburger Schule; alternative rock; noise pop
- Length: 48:47
- Label: Zickzack, Big Cat Records
- Producer: Blumfeld, Chris Von Rautenkranz

Blumfeld chronology
| Ich-Maschine (1992) | L’Etat Et Moi (1994) | Old Nobody (1998) |

Professional ratings
Review scores
| Source | Rating |
|---|---|
| AllMusic | 4/5 stars |
| Rolling Stone | 5/5 stars |
| Laut.de | 5/5 stars |
| Musikexpress | 6/6 stars |
| Select | 4/5 stars |

L’Etat Et Moi is the second full-length studio album by the German rock band Blumfeld and was released in August 1994. L’Etat Et Moi is considered one of the most important albums in the Hamburger Schule movement.

== Miscellaneous ==
The album was released by the Hamburg-based label Zickzack and by Big Cat Records. The British independent record label also distributed the album internationally. Zickzack re-released L’Etat Et Moi in 2001. It has been distributed by the label Blumfeld Tonträger since 2007.

The cover art is a parody of Elvis Presley’s 1959 album 50,000,000 Elvis Fans Can't Be Wrong.

During a joint tour in 1994, Blumfeld and the US indie rock band Pavement performed the song Verstärker/Amplifier together in Cologne.

== Reception ==
German critics rate L’Etat Et Moi as a landmark album of German rock music.

The British magazine New Musical Express ranked it number 37 in the list of the best albums of 1995.

Musikexpress voted L’Etat Et Moi 6th in the list of the 100 best German albums of all time.

== Track listing ==
All lyrics by Jochen Distelmeyer; with music by Eike Bohlken, Distelmeyer and André Rattay.

1. Draußen auf Kaution – 5:24 (“Out on parole”)
2. Jet Set – 2:13
3. 2 oder 3 Dinge, die ich von Dir weiß – 2:55 (“2 or 3 things I know of you”)
4. Walkie, Talkie – 3:24
5. Eine eigene Geschichte – 3:52 (“An own story”)
6. Verstärker – 4:50 (“Amplifier”)
7. Ich-Wie es wirklich war – 2:57 (“Me - how it really was”)
8. L’Etat et Moi (Mein Vorgehen in 4, 5 Sätzen) – 5:25 (“The state and me (My approach in 4, 5 sentences)”)
9. Sing Sing – 5:14
10. Evergreen – 4:05
11. Superstarfighter – 2:44
12. You Make Me – 5:44

== Production credits ==
Blumfeld

- Jochen Distelmeyer – vocals, guitar, piano
- Eike Bohlken – bass, guitar, harmonica, choir, chorus vocals
- André Rattay – drums, percussion

Production

- Blumfeld – producer, artwork, cover design
- Chris Von Rautenkranz – producer, technician

=== Choir members ===
The song Superstarfighter features musician friends from the Hamburg area.

- Svenja Rossa
- Rocko Schamoni
- Anne Schulte
- Katta Schulte
- Frank Spilker (Die Sterne)
- Ralf Vidakovicz
- Dirk von Lowtzow (Tocotronic)
- Pascal Fuhlbrügge
- Günther Jakob
- Schorsch Kamerun (Die Goldenen Zitronen)
- Tobias Levin
- Jutta Postel
- Tilman Rossmy (Die Regierung)
