= Egoexpress =

German electronic band

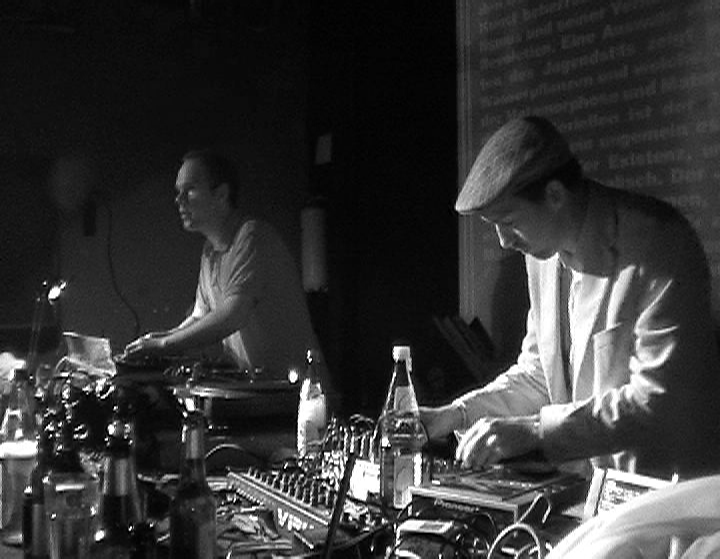
- In performance, 2005

Background information
- Origin: Hamburg, Germany
- Genres: Electronic music, House, pop, Techno
- Years active: 1995–present
- Labels: Bureau-B, L'Age D'Or, Ladomat 2000
- Members: Mense Reents; Jimi Siebels

Egoexpress is a German band from Hamburg, which was founded in 1995. The band consists of German musicians Mense Reents (also with Die Goldenen Zitronen) and Jimi Siebels.

== Band history ==
Reents and Siebels, both from East Frisia, who had known each other since their youth, came to Hamburg in 1990 as part of the broader movement surrounding the Hamburger Schule. After being active in various musical projects there, they founded Egoexpress in 1995.

Their musical style is described as a mixture of a certain rock aesthetic with techno drive, beats and electro(clash), which is far removed from techno dogma or retro aesthetics. Music, which is somewhere between techno, house, and pop, and was also influenced by mod culture, Neue Deutsche Welle and was characterized by a general punk attitude that gave Egoexpress a special status in the German club scene. By 1999, thanks in part to an invitation from Westbam to play Mayday, they were finally embraced into the wider electronic fold. This was followed by further appearances at major music events such as Festival Internacional de Benicàssim, the Fusion Festival, the Melt Festival, Nature One or SonneMondSterne.

Since its formation in 1995, the band has been based at the Hamburg label Ladomat 2000, which was a sublabel of L'age d'or. Between 1995 and 2006, the duo released a total of three albums and numerous singles and EPs on the label. In addition to their own releases, Reents and Siebels were in demand as remixers for numerous artists. They have released remixes for Bob Sinclar, Die Sterne, Deichkind, Rocko Schamoni, Miss Kittin, Tocotronic, Andreas Dorau, Tomcraft and Kid Alex, among others.

On September 12, 2025, a retrospective of the band's work entitled A Piece Of The Action (1995-2005) was released on the Hamburg Bureau B label.

== Discography (Selection) ==
=== Studio albums ===
- 1996: Foxy, LP/CD
- 1999: Bieker, LP/CD
- 2005: Hot Wire My Heart, LP/CD
- 2006: We Do Wie du/Hot Wire My Heart, DoLP/DoCD
- 2025: A Piece Of The Action (1995–2005), LP/CD/Download

=== Eps, 7", 12" ===
- 1995: Egoexpress, 12"
- 1995: Egoexpress zwei, 12"
- 1996: Telefunken, 12", Whitelabel
- 1997: We Are Here, EP
- 1998: Telefunken, EP
- 2000: Here Comes the Night, 12"
- 2000: Weiter, 12"
- 2005: KNARTZ IV, EP
- 2005: Aranda, EP

=== Commissioned musicworks ===
==== Remixes ====
- 1996: Blümchen – Boomerang
- 1996: Die Sterne – Trrrmmer
- 1997: Die Sterne – Themenläden
- 1997: Think About Mutation – Reflect It
- 1998: Fischmob – Du (Äh, Du)
- 1998: Les Robespierres – Maldiçao
- 1999: Yoshinori Sunahara – Love Beat
- 1999: Fischmob – Männer Können Seine Gefühle Nicht Zeigen
- 2000: Tocotronic – K.O.O.K.
- 2000: Aroma – Grooving
- 2001: Ostinato – Die Liebe
- 2001: Miss Kittin and Golden Boy – Rippin Kittin
- 2001: Bob Sinclar – Ich Rocke
- 2001: DJ Phono – Can't Slow Down
- 2002: Rocko Schamoni – Heart Of Plastic
- 2003: Tomcraft – Into The Light
- 2005: Kid Alex – Young + Beautiful
- 2006: Deichkind – Remmi Demmi (Yippie Yippie Yeah)
- 2006: Ian O'Brien-Docker – Totally Alright

==== Soundtracks ====
- 1998: Absolute Giganten (feature film) – Song Weiter
- 2005: Der Fischer und seine Frau (feature film) – Song Aranda
- 2017: Magical Mystery or: The Return of Karl Schmidt (Magical Mystery oder: Die Rückkehr des Karl Schmidt), (feature film) – Songs We Are Here (MMT Version 2016) and Telefunken (MMT Version 2016)
