= Dockville =

Music and art festival

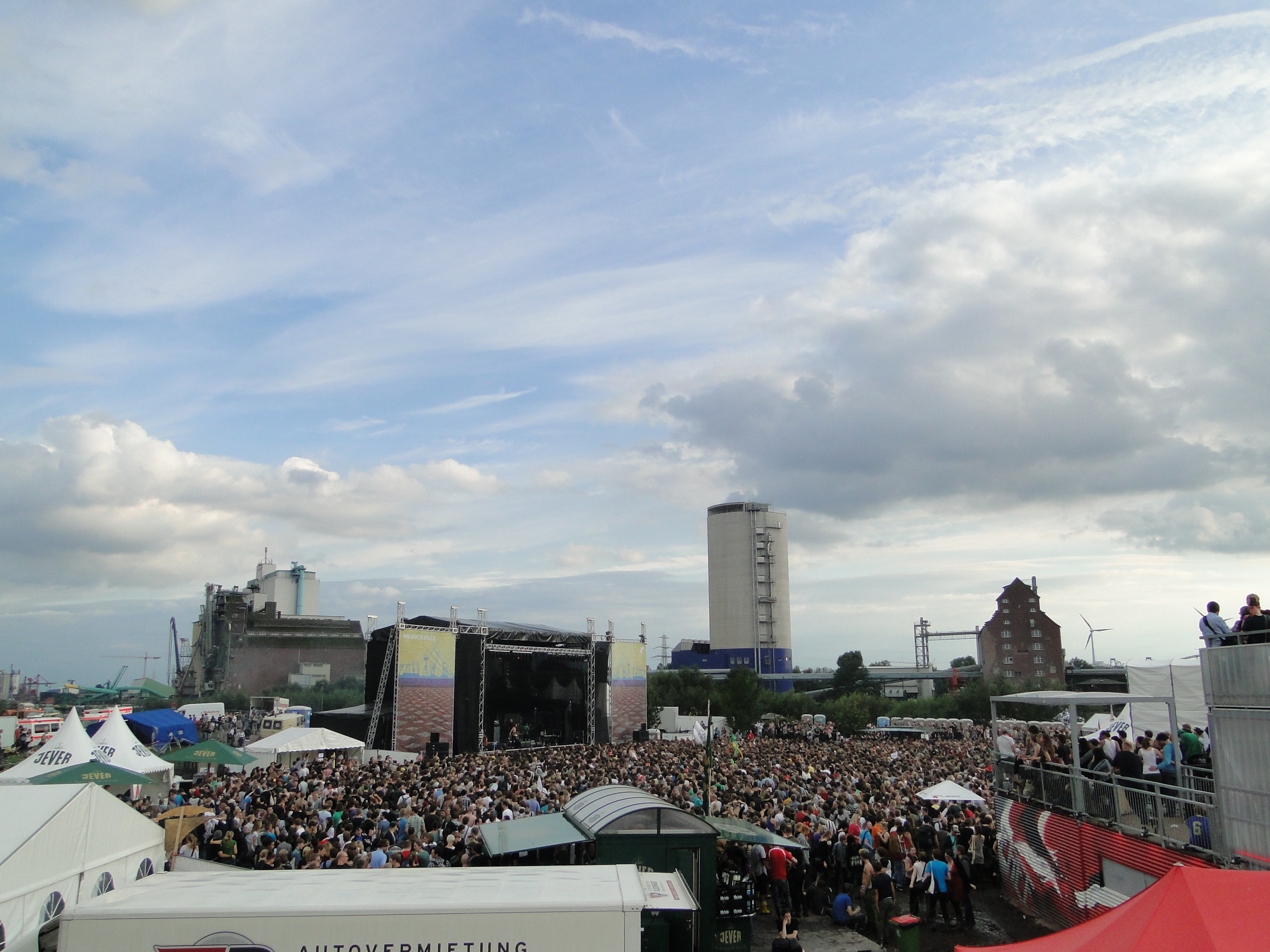
- Genre: Music, Visual arts
- Dates: August
- Locations: Wilhelmsburg, Germany
- Years active: 2007 – present
- Founders: Enno Arndt
- Website: www.dockville.de (German)

Dockville is a music and art festival on Europe's biggest river island, Hamburg's district Wilhelmsburg. It is sponsored by the German Internationale Bauausstellung (IBA) and it took place for the first time in 2007. Many parts of the festival area are located directly in front of the river Elbe, in a territory, which is not protected against flood. Characteristic for this festival is the combination of music and visual arts.

== 2007 ==
In 2007, when the festival took place for the first time, it had 5,000 festival visitors. Musical headliners were the German bands 2Raumwohnung and Tocotronic. The art director was the German artist Daniel Richter.

== 2008 ==
This year the festival lasted three days, starting on Friday, August 15 and ending on Sunday, August 18th. Headliners were German und British bands The Ting Tings, Deichkind, Fettes Brot and Television Personalities. The German artist Daniel Richter had the patronage of the artistic projects.

The German newspaper Hamburger Abendblatt reported, that nearly 10,000 people visited the festival and that the programme and the infrastructure had improved.

== 2009 ==
2009 the festival took place in the same area as before from Friday the 14th until Sunday the 18th of August. Musical headliners were MGMT, Turbonegro and the German bands Kettcar, Element of Crime and The Whitest Boy Alive. Again there was a combination of music and works of visual artists. The public radio and television broadcaster Norddeutscher Rundfunk and the German newspaper Hamburger Abendblatt reported, that 15,000 people visited the festival on its second day, occasionally causing some logistic problems.

== 2010 ==
The MS Dockville Festival of 2010 took place from August 13. til 15.. 111 artists performed, among them Klaxons, Wir sind Helden, Jan Delay, Jamie T, Slime, Neu!, K.I.Z, The Drums, Jupiter Jones, Uffie, Portugal. The Man, We Were Promised Jetpacks, Frittenbude, Die Sterne, The Whip, Agnes Carlsson, Villagers and Die Vögel.

== 2011 ==
In 2011 150 musicians played at Dockville, among them Santigold, Editors, Crystal Castles, ...And You Will Know Us by the Trail of Dead, The Bloody Beetroots, Johnossi, Marteria, Die Goldenen Zitronen, Kele, Kante, Edward Sharpe and the Magnetic Zeros, The Pains of Being Pure at Heart, Those Dancing Days, Noah and the Whale, Wild Beasts, Mount Kimbie, Andreas Dorau, Kollektiv Turmstrasse, Egotronic, DJ Phono, Bodi Bill, Hundreds und Kakkmaddafakka.

== 2012 ==
2012's festival lineup consisted of Hot Chip, James Blake, Maxïmo Park, Tocotronic, Metronomy, Frittenbude, Prinz Pi, The Maccabees, WhoMadeWho, Le Fly, Dillon, Wye Oak, Dear Reader, Die Vögel, Future Islands und Retro Stefson and others.
