= Lassie Singers =

German indie-pop band

- Origin: Berlin, Germany
- Genres: Indiepop, Hamburger Schule, Neue Deutsche Welle
- Years active: 1988–1998
- Labels: Columbia Records, Dragnet Records, Flittchen Records
- Members: Christiane Rösinger (vocals, guitar), Almut Klotz (vocals), Funny van Dannen (guitar), Kathrin von Witzleben (vocals), Heiner Weiß
- Past members: Britta Neander (drums); Herman Herrmann (guitar)

The Lassie Singers are an indie-pop band from Berlin-Kreuzberg that was active from 1988 to 1998. Their musical style was in between the Hamburger Schule and Neue Deutsche Welle. The Lassie Singers have been called the first German girl-band. The band's lyrics often use bitter humor to describe clichéd romantic relationships from a feminist perspective. For example, popular songs written by the Lassie singers include: Die Pärchenlüge (English translation: the couple-lie), Mein zukünftiger Exfreund (English translation: My future ex-boyfriend), and Liebe wird oft überbewertet (English translation: Love is over valued).

The Lassie Singers' largest commercial success came with the 1994 single Es ist so schade (English translation: It is too bad), peaking at number 24 in the Austrian Charts. They released four studio albums, the first of which was released on Columbia Records; their final three studio albums were released on Dragnet Records, a sub-label of Sony Music Germany.

== History ==
The founding members of the Lassie Singers were Christiane Rösinger, Almut Klotz, Heiner Weiß, Kathrin Fitzner (aka Kathrin Witzleben), and Funny van Dannen. The band had three front-women, and Rösinger wrote the band's song lyrics. van Dannen was only a member of the Lassie Singers for a short time; Herman Herrmann later joined the band as a guitarist. The band name refers to the American TV series Lassie. Over a period of years the Lassie Singers worked with many different well-known German pop-artists, including Bernd Begemann, King Rocko Schamoni, Die Regierung, Eff Jott Krüger (Ideal), and Jochen Distelmeyer (of Blumfeld).

Their first album Die Lassie Singers helfen Dir (English translation: "The Lassie Singers help you") was released in 1991. This was quickly followed by Sei À Gogo in 1992, and then Stadt, Land, Verbrechen in 1994. In 1996, the Lassie singers released the album Hotel Hotel, which was produced by Thomas Meinecke and recorded by Chris von Rautenkranz.

In 1998 the Lassie Singers broke up. Almut Klotz and Christiane Rösinger opened the record label Flittchen Records. Rösinger founded the band Britta and since 2010 has released two solo albums under her own name. Klotz and Sandra Grether founded the riot-grrl band Parole Trixi. Klotz also founded the band Maxi unter Menschen with Maximilian Hecker, and played as a duo with Christian Dabeler called Klotz+Dabeler. In 2013 Klotz died of breast cancer. In 2020 Christiane Rösinger won the Rio Reiser Sonderstipendium from the Musicboard Berlin.

== Discography ==
=== Studio albums ===
1. 1991: Die Lassie Singers helfen Dir (Columbia Records (Sony Music Entertainment))
2. 1992: Sei À Gogo (Dragnet Records (Sony Music Entertainment))
3. 1994: Stadt, Land, Verbrechen (Dragnet Records)
4. 1996: Hotel Hotel (Dragnet Records)

=== Compilation albums ===
- 1998: Best of Lassie Singers – Time to say Tschüss (Flittchen Records)
- 1998: Rest of Lassie Singers – rare & unreleased, 1988–1998 (Flittchen Records)

=== Singles ===
- 1991: Mein Freund hat mit mir Schluß gemacht
- 1991: Falsche Gedanken
- 1994: Schade! (Es ist so schade)
- 1996: Liebe wird oft überbewertet, Regen
