= Bernd Begemann =

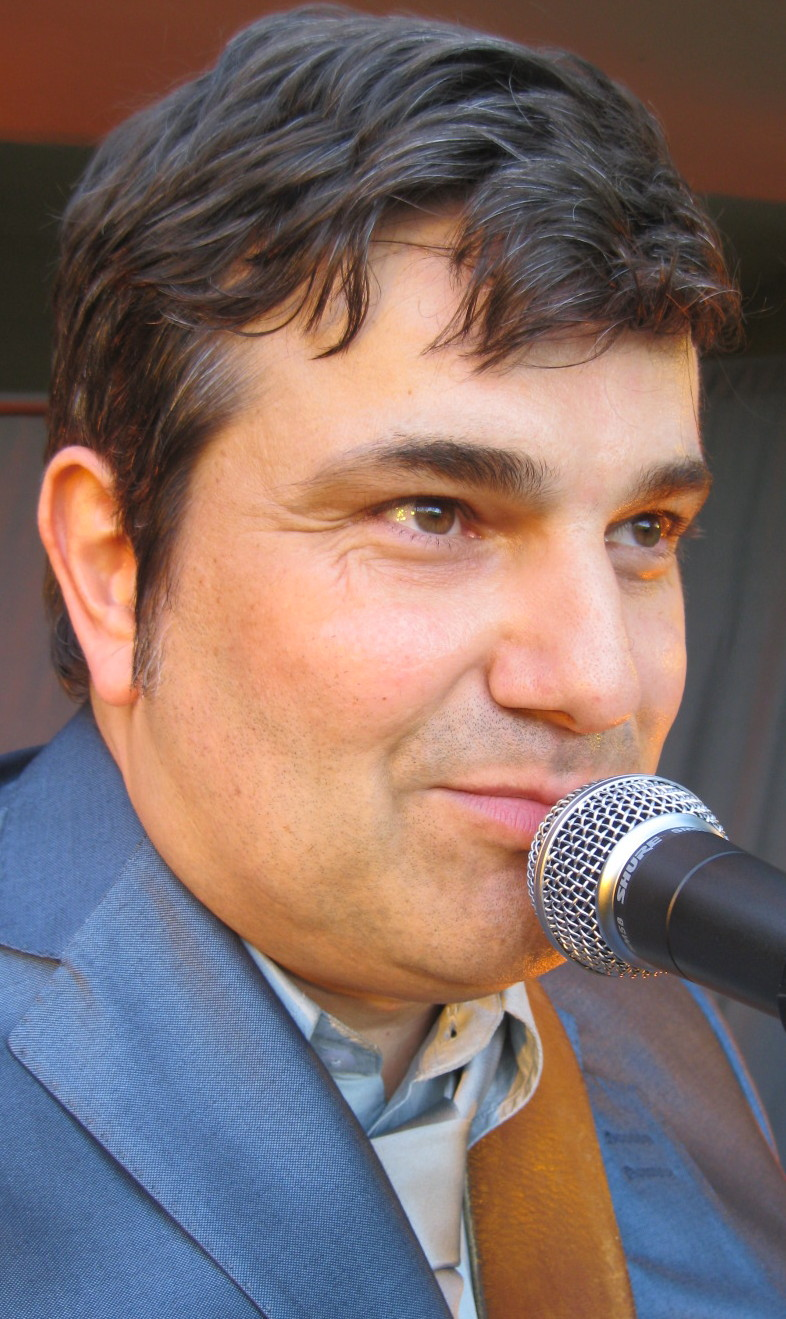
- Bernd Begemann, 2010

Background information
- Born: Kay Stephan Rönnau; 1962 (age 63–64); Braunschweig, Federal Republic of Germany
- Years active: 1980s–present
- Label: Grand Hotel van Cleef
- Website: Bernd-Begemann.de

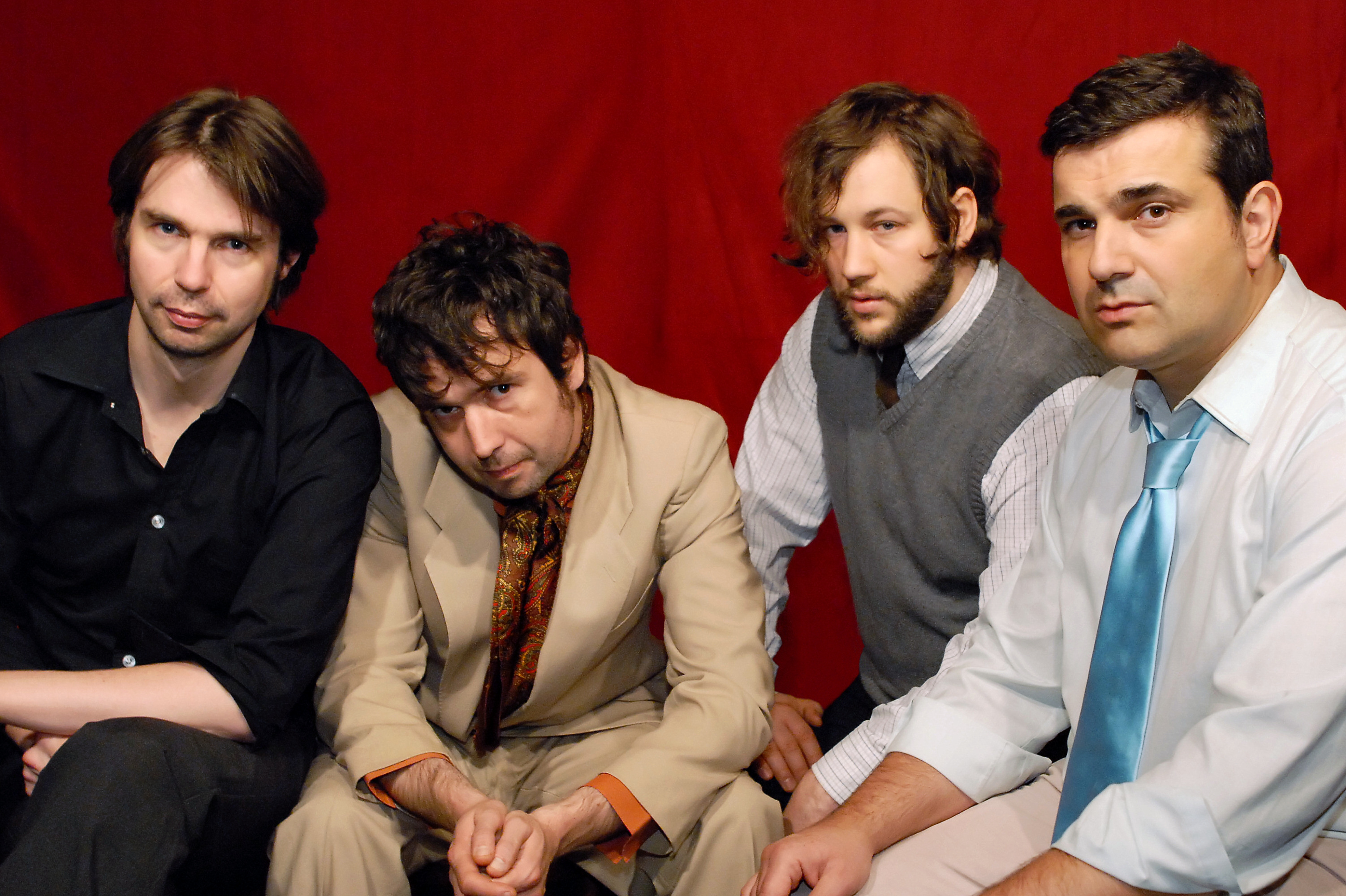
Bernd Begemann (far right) and band Die Befreiung, Oct. 2007

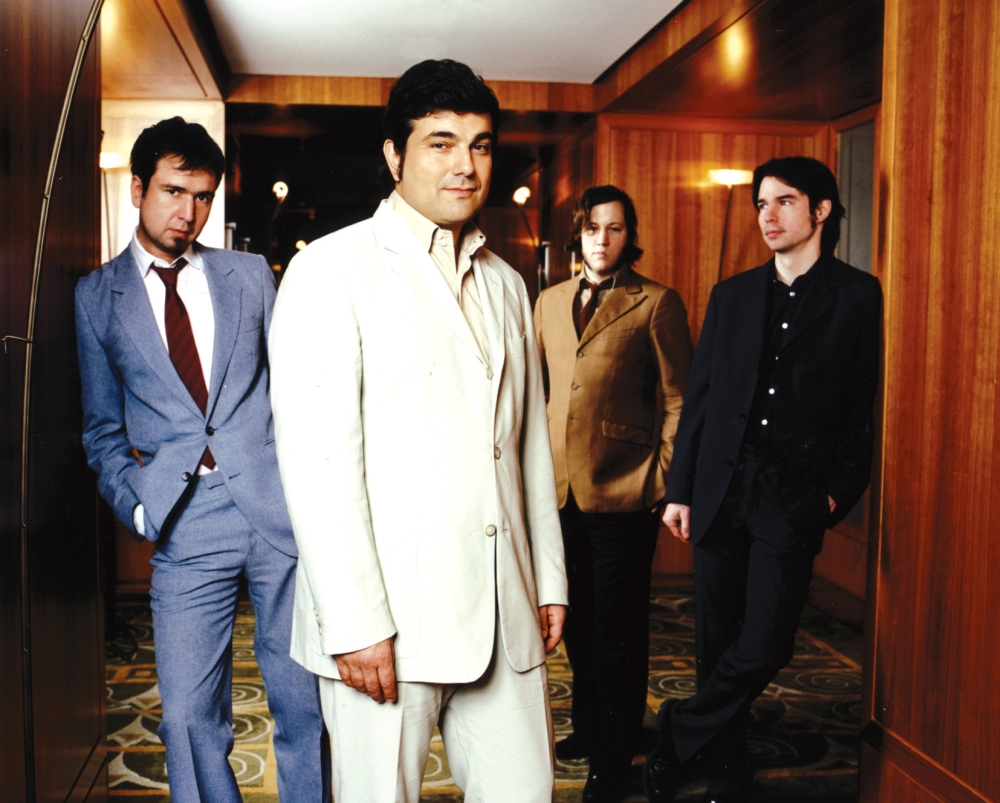
Bernd Begemann (second from left) and band Die Befreiung, 2005

Bernd Begemann (born 1 November 1962 in Braunschweig as Kay Stephan Rönnau) is a contemporary German alt/pop singer-songwriter, actor, producer and filmmusic-composer linked to the Hamburger Schule.

== Biography ==
Begemann's biological parents were Aykut Ünyazıcı, a footballer from Turkey at Eintracht Braunschweig and a woman from Germany. In 1963, he was adopted by Bernhard Begemann at the age of six months, who gave him his new name. He was very successful as sportsman as a teen and young adult and won a lot of competitions, because he was extremely talented as very fast runner but in the end of the 1970s, in his hometown of Bad Salzuflen (Germany) he became a punk and he founded in 1979 a punk rock band with the "real rebel name", "Vatikan". The members of this band were Bernd Begemann, Frank Jacobs (later in the band "Out of Order" and "Time Twisters") and Martin Stammeier (later, the drummer of many Metal-bands).

From the middle to the end of the 1980s he was part of the Pop-music label "Fast Weltweit" (almost worldwide). It was founded by Michael Girke, Achim Knorr, Andreas Henning, Frank Spilker (Die Sterne) and Frank Werner. They released singles and cassette tape samplers, such as Jochen Distelmeyer's (later in the band Blumfeld) "Bienenjäger" with Thomas Wenzel (now in Die Goldenen Zitronen and Die Sterne) and the very first Die Sterne single. Even with his connection to "Fast Weltweit", Bernd never released any records with them.

When he was 20, Begemann moved to Hamburg to later create the band known as Die Antwort (engl.: The Answer). With Die Antwort, Begemann would finally be able to do the music he's always desired. This made the "Hamburg-Ostwestfalen-Verbindung" (the Hamburg-East-Westphalian Connection).

1988 was the year that it finally happened: Die Antwort released its first CD. Produced for 150,000 german marks (by RCA), the (untitled) CD flopped because, according to some people, the band's "image was too hard for their soft sound". Eventually, Die Antwort broke up as a band.

With respect to his musical attitude, Begemann said: "I only make music because nobody can speak for me. I'm the only one who can. That's why being punk doesn't just mean drinking cheap beer and puking on the sidewalk."

== Discography ==
=== Bernd Begemann and Die Befreiung ===
Albums

- Unsere Liebe ist ein Aufstand (2004)
- Glanz (2008)
- Ich erkläre diese Krise für beendet (2009)

Singles

- Ich habe nichts erreicht außer dir (2004)

=== Bernd Begemann and Dirk Darmstaedter ===
Albums

- This Road Doesn't Lead to My House Anymore (2003)
- So geht das jede Nacht (2010)

=== Bernd Begemann ===
Albums

- Rezession, Baby! (1993)
- Solange die Rasenmäher singen (1994)
- Sexy Sadie (1996)
- Jetzt bist du in Talkshows (1996)
- Sag Hallo zur Hölle (2000)
- Live (2001)
- Endlich (2003)
- Ich werde sie finden (2006)
- Ich erkläre diese Krise für beendet (2009)
- Wilde Brombeeren (2011)
- Eine kurze Liste mit Forderungen (2015)
- Die Stadt und das Mädchen (2018)

Singles

- Rezession, Baby! (1993, vinyl only)
- Viel zu glücklich (um es lange zu bleiben) (1994)
- Zweimal zweite Wahl (1996)
- Bis Du den richtigen triffst – nimm mich (2003)

=== Die Antwort ===
Albums

- Die Antwort (1987)
- # 1 (1991)
- Hier (1992)
- Die Antwort (1998)

Singles

- Unten wann wann (1987)
- Sie haben alles verkauft (1990)
- Morgen tut es dir leid (1990)
- Meine Jahre mit Elisabeth Taylor (1990)
- Oh ja / Oh Nein (1992)
- Was macht Miss Juni im Dezember (1992)
- Ich habe mich rasiert (1998)
- Ein Abschied zuviel (1998)

== Notes ==
1. BB: "Ich mache nur Musik, weil niemand für mich sprechen kann. Das kann nur ich selbst tun! Punk heißt nämlich gar nicht Dosenbier trinken und in die Fußgängerzone kotzen." (PlayGirl 2/97)
