= Netto Houz =

- Also known as: Netto
- Origin: Berlin, Germany
- Genres: House
- Years active: 1994–present
- Labels: Ladomat 2000
- Members: Ralf Zimmermann; Markus Wegner
- Website: www.thing.org/nettohouz/

Netto Houz or Netto is a Berlin-based house music project formed by Ralf Zimmermann and Markus Wegner in 1994.

In the second half of the 1990s Netto Houz appeared alongside projects like Whirlpool Productions on Ladomat 2000, the dance and electronic music department of L'Age D'Or, which was one of the record labels that had evolved from the Hamburg indie music scene known as Hamburger Schule.

At first, Netto Houz was heavily influenced by the sound of Chicago labels like Relief Records or Dance Mania, but developed a deeper musical style over the years. Because of the strong Disco and Deep House references of their 1998 Album Room 7107 the duo helped to pave the way for the revival of these genres in the Berlin club scene of the 2000s.

== Discography ==
=== Album ===
- Netto Houz: Room 7107. Ladomat 2000, 1998 (Lado 2072-1/2, CD/DLP).

=== Singles ===
- Netto: Elektro Funk. Ladomat 2000, 1995 (Lado 2010, 12").
- Netto: The World of Netto. Ladomat 2000, 1995 (Lado 2021, 12”).
- Netto: Fan of Underground. Ladomat 2000, 1996 (Lado 2043, 12”).
- Netto Houz: (feat. Elbee Bad): Bad Man Speaks (extended version) / Knuggles. Knuggles Recordings, 2011 (KNR 001, 12").
- Netto Houz / Moire Patterns: 7107 Music (original 12" mix) / The Roots Anthems 001. Knuggles Recordings, 2011 (KNR 002, 12").
- Netto Houz: Noctambulism / Rossi's Records. Knuggles Recordings, 2012 (KNR005, 12").
- Netto Houz: Fingertalk / Franz' Theme, Feels So Good Inside. Knuggles Recordings, 2014 (KNR008, 12").
- Netto Houz: Rising 2016. Knuggles Recordings, 2016 (KNR010, 12").
