= Britta (band) =

German indie rock band

- Origin: Berlin, Germany
- Genres: Indie rock
- Years active: 1997–2006, 2018 (reunion)
- Labels: Flittchen Records
- Members: Christiane Rösinger (vocals, guitar), Britta Neander (drums) (until 2004, †), Julie Miess (bass), Barbara Wagner (guitar), Herman Herrmann (drums), Sebastian Vogel (drums)

Britta is an indie rock band, founded in the beginning of 1997 in Berlin, Germany. The band produced four albums, which were all released on the indie label Flittchen Records.

== History ==
The band Britta was founded by guitarist and singer Christiane Rösinger (of the Lassie Singers), drummer Britta Neander (of the Ton Steine Scherben), and the bass player Julie Miess. The band was distributed by the Berlin-based record label Flittchen Records, which was founded and run by Christiane Rösinger and Almut Klotz.

Important early performances for the band included opening for Tocotronic and Blumfeld. Their first album Irgendwas ist immer was produced by Tobias Levin and was favorably reviewed.

Britta's second album Kollektion Gold and their third album Lichtjahre voraus were recorded in France and released on Flittchen Records. Several songs on these albums were used by René Pollesch in theater pieces. The title song for his tv series 24 Stunden sind kein Tag was written by Britta.

During Britta's club tour, Britta Neander had to take time out to take care of her daughter. Sebastian Vogel of the band Kante temporarily substituted for her on drums. After health problems prevented Britta Neander from rejoining the band on tour, Herman Herrmann played on drums for the Blumfeld tour.

In 2004, Christiane Rösinger spent several months in hospital. Then on December 14, 2004, Britta Neander died after a heart operation. Sebastian Vogel joined the band as a permanent replacement on drums. In 2005, the album Das schöne Leben was recorded. In 2006, this fourth album was released on Flittchen Records.

In September 2018, the compilation album Best Of Britta was released on the label Staatsakt. This compilation album was supported by a reunion tour.

== Discography ==
=== Studio albums ===
1. 1999: Irgendwas ist immer
2. 2001: Kollektion Gold
3. 2003: Lichtjahre Voraus
4. 2006: Das schöne Leben

=== Compilations ===
1. 2018: Best Of Britta

=== Singles (selected) ===
1. 2001: The DJ 4-Track Ep
2. 2006: Depressiver Tag
