= Rippin Kittin =

Single by Golden Boy with Miss Kittin

from the album Or
- Released: 26 August 2002
- Recorded: 2001
- Genre: Electroclash
- Length: 4:48
- Label: Ladomat 2000
- Songwriter(s): Golden Boy, Caroline Hervé

Golden Boy singles chronology
"Rippin Kittin" (2002)	"Autopilot" (2003)

Miss Kittin singles chronology
"Madame Hollywood" (2002)	"Rippin Kittin" (2002)	"Autopilot" (2003)

Music video
- "Rippin Kittin (Glove Radiomix)" on YouTube

"Rippin Kittin" is the first single from the duo Miss Kittin and Golden Boy's 2001 album Or. The 12" version of the single was released in 2001 on Ladomat 2000. It was re-released in 2002 by Zomba Records and Illustrious Records.

== Critical reception ==
Pitchfork Media placed "Rippin Kittin" at #435 on its Top 500 Tracks of the 2000s list. Pitchfork also included the song in its book The Pitchfork 500: Our Guide to the Greatest Songs from Punk to the Present.

Neil Tennant of the Pet Shop Boys has paid tribute to the song as a favourite of his in multiple interviews.

== Cover versions ==
Belgian rock band Mintzkov covered the song for the compilation album 10 Years Mintzkov: Rare Recordings 2001-2011.

== Track listing ==
- German Vinyl

A1. "Rippin Kittin (Original)" - 4:51
A2. "Rippin Kittin (Turner Mix)" - 5:24
A3. "Rippin Kittin (Ellen Allien Mix)" - 4:30
B1. "Rippin Kittin (Egoexpress Mix)" - 6:12
B2. "Rippin Kittin (Alexander Polzin Mix)" - 6:26

- German CD, Maxi single
1. "Rippin Kittin (Glove Radiomix)" - 3:47
2. "Rippin Kittin (Original)" - 4:50
3. "Rippin Kittin (Glove Tension Dub)" - 7:41
4. "Rippin Kittin (Golden Boy With Turner's Strings Mix)" - 3:15
5. "Rippin Kittin (Ellen Allien Mix)" - 4:30
6. "Rippin Kittin (Beroshima Mix)" - 5:45
7. "Rippin Kittin (Egoexpress Mix)" - 6:12
- UK CD single
1. "Rippin Kittin (Glove Radio Edit)" - 3:35
2. "Rippin Kittin (X-Press 2 Late Night Homicide Vocal Edit)" - 7:34

== Charts ==
Chart (2002)	Peak position
Belgian Tip Chart (Flanders)	15
Belgian Tip Chart (Wallonia)	18
Belgian Dance Chart	8
German Singles Chart	95
UK Singles Chart	67
UK Dance Chart	1
Chart (2006)	Peak position
Spanish Singles Chart	11
