= Campari Soda (song) =

Single by Taxi
- Released: 1977
- Songwriter: Dominique Grandjean

"Campari Soda" is a song of the Swiss band Taxi released in 1977. It was written by Dominique Grandjean who works as a psychiatrist today.

== Writing and inspiration ==
The song is sung in the Swiss German dialect of Zurich and deals with the incomparable feeling of flying and the painful longing of the faraway. The first lines of the song read as follows:

Ich nime no'n Campari soda
Wit under mir liit's Wolkemeer
De Ventilator summet liisli
Es isch as gäbs mich nüme mee

English translation:

I take another Campari soda
The sea of clouds lies underneath me
The fan is humming quietly
It is as if I didn't exist any longer

== Composition ==
The dreamy singing is underlain by unostentatious piano sounds. The song begins with a saxophone-solo.

== Chart performance ==
In 2006, the song experienced a revival, when it was used in an advertising spot of the Swiss International Air Lines and released as a single for the first time because of the remarkable success of the advertisement. "Campari Soda" debuted at #6 on December 12, 2006. It rose to and peaked at #3 in its fourth week. The song spent a total of 35 weeks on the Swiss Singles Chart.

== Cover versions and adaptations ==
The song was unsuccessful during its original release. "Campari Soda" gained popularity only by the interpretations by numerous Swiss musicians, among others Stephan Eicher, Span, Doppelgänger. Golden Boy and Miss Kittin covered "Campari Soda" for their 2002 album Or.

== Charts ==
Chart (2006)	Peak Position
Swiss Singles Chart	3

== Literature ==
- Daum, Matthias: Vom Verschwinden. Zur Geschichte des besten Schweizer Popsongs – «Campari Soda». In: Neue Zürcher Zeitung, 8.12.2006 (online).
