= From Disco to Disco =

"From: Disco to: Disco"

Single by Whirlpool Productions

from the album Dense Music
- B-side: "Remix"
- Released: 1996
- Studio: Planet Whirlpool + Can Studio, Weilerswist
- Genre: House; nu-disco
- Length: 3:20
- Label: ElektroMotor; Ladomat 2000; Sum Records
- Songwriters: Eric D. Clark; Justus Köhncke; Hans Nieswandt; DJ Disco Barticus
- Producer: Whirlpool Productions

Whirlpool Productions singles chronology
"Cold Song" (1996)	"From: Disco to: Disco" (1996)	"Crazy Music" (1998)

Music video
- "From Disco to Disco" on YouTube

"From: Disco to: Disco" is a song recorded by German experimental house music project Whirlpool Productions. It is produced by Eric D. Clark, Justus Köhncke and Hans Nieswandt, and was released in 1996 by ElektroMotor, Ladomat 2000 and Sum Records as the second single from the project's second album, Dense Music (1996). A huge hit in clubs, the song reached number-one in Italy for nine weeks in the summer of 1997. Additionally, "From: Disco to: Disco" also peaked at number 13 in Belgium and number 54 in the Netherlands. The accompanying music video was directed by Smoczek Policzek. Ten years later, in 2006, the song was released in a new version, as "From: Disco to: Disco 2006".

== Critical reception ==
Pan-European magazine Music & Media wrote, "This German production is a killer dancefloor filler, as the Cologne-based house triumvirate radiate a real "Let's do-a-disco-pastiche!" feeling. Serious or not, Eric D. Clark, Justus Köhncke and Hans Niewandt have obviously hit the right key, as this single, taken from their second album Dense Music has already been a hit in Italy. In Holland, it is one of the favourite dance videos on music television channel TMF. Station head of music Erik Kross is enthusiastic about the track, but concedes: "It is a kind of 'love-it-or hate-it' track. A little resistance is always good, though, as it makes people talk about it." However, Kross predicts 'From: Disco to: Disco' will be around for a while this summer. "Although it won't by far become as big a hit as Bellini's 'Samba de Janeiro'," he suggests, "it has all the elements of a genuine sleeper." Spex included "From: Disco to: Disco" in their "The Best Singles of the Century" list in 1999.

== Track listing ==
- 12" single, Germany (1996)
1. "From: Disco to: Disco" (DJ Pierre's Wild Pitch Mix) — 9:22
2. "From: Disco to: Disco" (Album Version) — 5:58
3. "From: Disco to: Disco" (Extended Disco Mix) — 11:44
- CD single, Germany (1996)
1. "From: Disco to: Disco" (Single Mix) — 3:20
2. "From: Disco to: Disco" (Original Album Version) — 5:56
- CD maxi, UK & Europe (1996)
1. "From: Disco to: Disco" (Original Album Version) — 5:56
2. "From: Disco to: Disco" (Just Us Disco Mix) — 7:33
3. "From: Disco to: Disco" (The Whirlpool Disco Opera) — 11:44
4. "From: Disco to: Disco" (Arj Snoek) — 5:18
5. "From: Disco to: Disco" (DJ Pierre's Wild Pitch Mix) — 9:07

== Charts ==
Chart (1996–1997)	Peak position
Belgium (Ultratop 50 Flanders)	19
Belgium (Ultratop 50 Wallonia)	13
Europe (Eurochart Hot 100)	46
France Airplay (SNEP)	48
Italy (Musica e dischi)	1
Italy Airplay (Music & Media)	3
Lithuania (M-1)	16
Netherlands (Dutch Top 40 Tipparade)	4
Netherlands (Single Top 100)	54
Scotland (OCC)	89
UK Singles (OCC)	79
