= Dirk von Lowtzow =

German musician (born 1971)

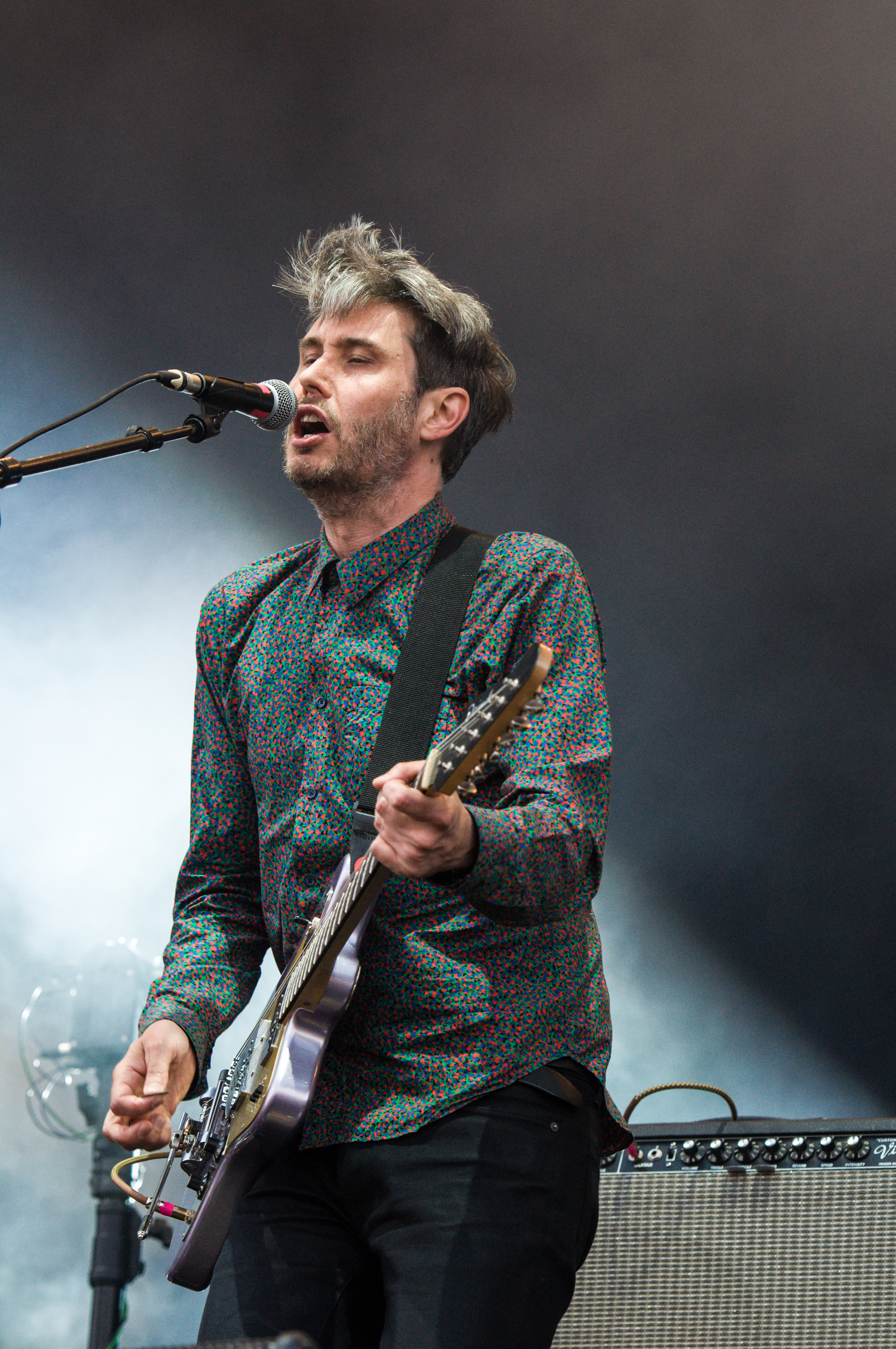
- Von Lowtzow in 2013

Background information
- Born: 21 March 1971 (age 54); Offenburg, Baden-Württemberg, West Germany
- Genres: Independent; Hamburger Schule
- Instruments: Guitar, vocals
- Years active: 1994–present
- Website: https://www.tocotronic.de

Dirk von Lowtzow (born 21 March 1971) is a German musician. He has been the singer and guitarist with German rock band Tocotronic since 1994. Since 2001 he has also been active with the German electronic music project Phantom/Ghost. In 1997, he took part in the compilation disc Musik für junge Leute with the song Charlotte, which refers to a L'Âge d'or label employee by that name.

== Discography ==
=== Tocotronic ===
- Digital ist Besser (1995)
- Nach der verlorenen Zeit (1995)
- Wir kommen um uns zu beschweren (1996)
- Es ist egal, aber... (1997)
- K.O.O.K. (1999)
- Tocotronic (2002)
- Pure Vernunft darf niemals siegen (2005)
- Kapitulation (2007)
- Schall und Wahn (2010)
- Wie wir leben wollen (2013)
- Das rote Album (2015)
- Die Unendlichkeit (2018)
- Nie wieder Krieg (2022)

=== Phantom/Ghost ===
- Phantom/Ghost (2001)
- To Damascus (2003)
- Three (2006)
- Thrown Out Of Drama School (2009)
