= Schamoni =

Schamoni is a surname. Notable people with the surname include:

- Peter Schamoni (1934–2011), German film director, producer, and screenwriter
- Rocko Schamoni (born 1966), German entertainer, author, and musician
- Ulrich Schamoni (1939–1998), German film director, brother of Peter
