= Or (album) =

Studio album by Golden Boy with Miss Kittin
- Released: 13 August 2001
- Recorded: 2001
- Genre: Electroclash; dance; techno
- Length: 49:36
- Label: Ladomat 2000
- Producer: Stefan Altenburger

Miss Kittin chronology
Intimités (1999)	Or (2001)	First Album (2001)

Golden Boy chronology
Or (2001)

Alternative cover
- US cover

Singles from Or
- 1. "Rippin Kittin" Released: 26 August 2002; 2. "Autopilot" Released: 2003

Professional ratings
Review scores
Source	Rating
AllMusic	2.5/5 stars
Chart	3/5 stars
Venus Zine	Favorable

Or is a collaborative album by Swiss musician Golden Boy and French singer and DJ Miss Kittin. It was released in Austria, Germany and Switzerland on 13 August 2001 by Ladomat 2000 and internationally on 23 March 2002 by Illustrious Records in the United Kingdom and Emperor Norton Records in the United States. The album includes the successful club single "Rippin Kittin" and a cover of "Campari Soda".

The tracks "Nix" and "It's Good for You to Meet People Like Us" were both included in the 2003 racing video game Midnight Club II.

== Singles ==
"Rippin Kittin" was released as the first single on the album in 2001 in Germany, and on 26 August 2002 internationally. The song topped the UK Dance Chart and was placed at number 435 on Pitchfork's list of the Top 500 Tracks of the 2000s.

== Track listing ==
All tracks are written by Stefan Altenburger, except where noted

German edition
No.	Title	Writer(s)	Length
1.	"Autopilot"	Altenburger (music); Caroline Hervé (lyrics)	5:55
2.	"It's Good for You to Meet People Like Us"		6:41
3.	"Campari Soda"	Dominique Grandjean	4:48
4.	"Nix"		6:01
5.	"Rippin Kittin"	Altenburger (music); Hervé (lyrics)	4:47
6.	"Kuckucksur"		6:41
7.	"1234"		4:43
8.	"Kopfstand"	Altenburger (music); Hervé (lyrics)	10:00
Total length:			49:36

UK edition
No.	Title	Writer(s)	Length
1.	"Autopilot"	Altenburger (music); Hervé (lyrics)	5:55
2.	"It's Good for You to Meet People Like Us"		6:41
3.	"1234" (vocal version)		4:43
4.	"Nix"		6:01
5.	"Rippin Kittin"	Altenburger (music); Hervé (lyrics)	4:47
6.	"Kuckucksur"		6:14
7.	"Campari Soda"	Grandjean	4:48
8.	"After 8"	Altenburger (music); Hervé (lyrics)	4:23
9.	"Kopfstand"	Altenburger (music); Hervé (lyrics)	10:00
Total length:			53:32

US edition
No.	Title	Writer(s)	Length
1.	"Intro"		0:41
2.	"Autopilot"	Altenburger (music); Hervé (lyrics)	5:54
3.	"It's Good for You to Meet People Like Us"		6:41
4.	"1234"		5:18
5.	"Nix"		6:01
6.	"Rippin Kittin"	Altenburger (music); Hervé (lyrics)	4:47
7.	"Kuckucksuhr"		6:14
8.	"Campari Soda"	Grandjean	4:47
9.	"After 8"	Altenburger (music); Hervé (lyrics)	4:23
10.	"Kopfstand"	Altenburger (music); Hervé (lyrics)	10:10
Total length:			54:56

2004 US reissue bonus tracks
No.	Title	Writer(s)	Length
11.	"Rippin Kittin" (Glove Radio Mix)	Altenburger (music); Hervé (lyrics)	3:49
12.	"Autopilot" (Casino Remix)	Altenburger (music); Hervé (lyrics)	3:33

== Personnel ==
Credits adapted from the liner notes of Or.

- Stefan Altenburger – production
- Miss Kittin – vocals on "Autopilot", "Rippin Kittin" and "Kopfstand"
- Bernd Steinwedel – mastering at Studio-Nord-Bremen (Bremen, Germany)
- Rike Weiger – cover
- Anne-Lise Coste – illustration
- Jules Spinatsch - photography US versions
- Claudia Schmauder – graphics US versions
