= Rockford Kabine =

German artist group

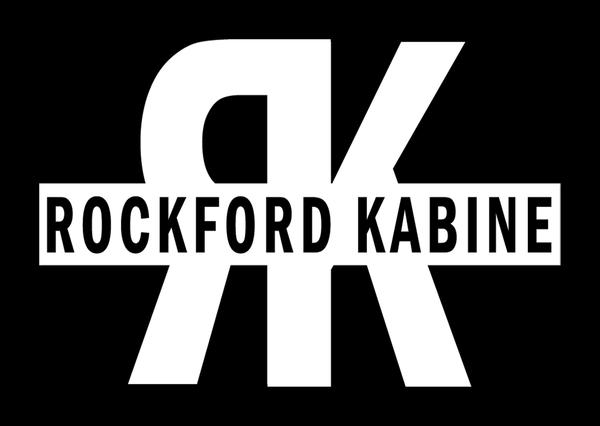
- Logo (white on black)

Background information
- Genres: Lo-fi, psychedelic, trip hop, electronica, soundtrack, classical
- Occupations: Musicians, Composers, Producers
- Years active: 1999–present
- Members: Antony Sharas; Marlon Marlon
- Website: www.rockfordkabine.com

Rockford Kabine (short RK) is a German artist group from Bochum (Ruhrgebiet) comprising composers and producers Antony Sharas and Marlon Marlon. After having released various EPs and Albums in self distribution between 2002 and 2006, from then on they put their emphasis on soundtrack collaborations with different filmmakers in the field of independent porn movies. In 2013, they started working on two feature films by Norwegian filmmaker Thomas Eikrem, Le Accelerator and Detroit Rising, a martial arts thriller and a post-war trauma drama. In 2013, further collaboration has been done with the Zonders, an international artist collective making music influenced graphic and print design.

== Discography ==
- Hotel Homosex (2002), EP
- If You Say Amerika (2003), Single
- Live Chamber (2003), Live Album
- Black Nazi (2004), EP
- 20:15 (2005), LP
- Supermarkt E. P. (2006), EP
- Italian Music (2007; Carhartt/Combination Records), LP
- Mein Hass (2010), Single (with Rocko Schamoni & Cordelia Waal)
- Xero (2010), DVD+CD
- HoXXXton (2012), LP
- Copenhagen Climax (2013), LP
- Le Accelerator (2015), LP
- Rockford Kabine-Sinfonie Nr. 1 (2019), EP
- Cannibal Queen Ost (2019), LP

== Filmography ==
- Xero (2010)
- Cannibal Queen (2011)
- HoXXXton (2016)
- Copenhagen Climax (2016)
- Le Accelerator (2016)
- Detroit Rising (2017)

== Awards ==
- 2010: AVN Award, Best Music Soundtrack, "Live In My Secrets", Alt porn movie by Kimberly Kane, (Vivid.Alt)
- 2011: AVN Award-Nominee: Best All-Girl-Release, "Xero"
- 2011: AVN Award-Nominee: Best Art Direction, "Xero"
- 2011: AVN Award-Nominee: Best Music Soundtrack, "Xero"
- 2011: AVN Award-Nominee: Best Tease Performance (Jayme Langford), "Xero"
- 2011: AltPorn Award: Best Feature AltPorn Video
