= Tocsin (album) =

Studio album by Xmal Deutschland
- Released: 25 June 1984
- Recorded: Livingston Studios, London 1984
- Genre: Post-punk; gothic rock; dark wave
- Length: 37:57
- Label: 4AD
- Producer: Mick Glossop

Xmal Deutschland chronology
Fetisch (1983)	Tocsin (1984)	Viva (1987)

Singles from Tocsin
- 1. "Incubus Succubus II" Released: September 1983

Tocsin is the second studio album by German post-punk band Xmal Deutschland. It was released in June 1984 on 4AD.

== Critical reception ==
Professional ratings
Review scores
Source	Rating
AllMusic	4.5/5 stars

AllMusic awarded Tocsin four-and-a-half stars out of five, praising the album as "a creative high point, a teutonic marriage of Siouxsie and the Banshees' inviting goth-pop and the majestic sonic spaces of the Cocteau Twins."

== Track listing ==
All tracks are written by Xmal Deutschland.

Side I
No.	Title	Length
1.	"Mondlicht"	5:03
2.	"Eiland"	5:31
3.	"Reigen"	3:59
4.	"Tag für Tag"	4:51

Side II
No.	Title	Length
1.	"Augen•Blick"	3:50
2.	"Begrab mein Herz"	3:01
3.	"Nachtschatten"	3:56
4.	"Xmas^{s} in Australia"	3:14
5.	"Derwisch"	4:32
Total length:		37:57

Bonus tracks on CD reissue
No.	Title	Length
10.	"Incubus Succubus II"	4:45
11.	"Vito"	4:26

== Personnel ==
Musicians

- Vocals: Anja Huwe
- Guitars: Manuela Rickers
- Keyboards: Fiona Sangster
- Bass: Wolfgang Ellerbrock
- Drums: Petter Bellendir (tracks 1–9); Manuela Zwingman (tracks 10 and 11)

Production

- Produced by Mick Glossop (tracks 1–9); Ivo Watts-Russell and John Fryer (tracks 10 and 11)
- Engineered by Mick Glossop; assisted by Felix Kendall
- Design by 23 Envelope
