= ZickZack =

German record label

Zickzack
- Founded: 1980
- Founder: Alfred Hilsberg
- Distributor: Rip Off
- Country of origin: Germany
- Location: Hamburg, Germany
- Official website: www.zickzack3000.de

ZickZack Schallplatten is a German record label based in Hamburg. Founded by former "Sounds" magazine journalist Alfred Hilsberg in 1980, it mainly distinguished itself by releasing acts from the underground side of Neue Deutsche Welle, a term coined by Hilsberg in his Sounds article "Neue Deutsche Welle - Aus grauer Städte Mauern".

Since then, the label has become a platform for many German independent bands. For example, they promoted Blumfeld and other influential bands of the Hamburger Schule during the early 1990s.

Other notable bands on this label include Abwärts, Xmal Deutschland, Einstürzende Neubauten, Die Krupps, Palais Schaumburg, F.S.K and Die Tödliche Doris.
