= Xmal Deutschland =

German band

- Origin: Hamburg, West Germany
- Genres: Post-punk; gothic rock; Neue Deutsche Welle; dark wave; new wave; alternative rock; dream pop
- Years active: 1980–1990
- Labels: ZickZack; 4AD; X-ile; Metronome; Sacred Bones Records
- Past members: Anja Huwe; Manuela Rickers; Fiona Sangster; Rita Simonsen; Caro May; Wolfgang Ellerbrock; Manuela Zwingmann; Peter Bellendir

Xmal Deutschland (pronounced: /ɪksmal ˈdɔʏtʃlant/), often written as X-Mal Deutschland, were a German gothic rock band. Founded in 1980 with a completely female line-up, they had chart success both in and outside their native country. Their last album was released in 1989.

== Biography ==
Xmal Deutschland were formed in 1980 by Anja Huwe (vocals), Manuela Rickers (guitar), Fiona Sangster (keyboards), Rita Simonsen (bass) and Caro May (drums) in Hamburg. Their first single, "Schwarze Welt", was released a year later on Alfred Hilsberg’s ZickZack label. The band also contributed to the label compilation Lieber Zuviel Als Zuwenig (ZZ 45). Around this time, Rita Simonsen was replaced by Wolfgang Ellerbrock. The band's name comes from the title of the book X-Mal Deutschland written by German journalist and activist Rudolf Walter Leonhard.

In 1982, the group released the single "Incubus Succubus", which would go on to become their most successful song and be considered a "cult post-punk classic". Caro May left the band and formed a new band, and was replaced by Manuela Zwingmann the same year. While German audiences were less than receptive at first, a United Kingdom tour opening for Cocteau Twins resulted in a deal with independent label 4AD. Their debut album, Fetisch and the singles "Qual" and "Incubus Succubus II" were released in 1983, all three making the UK Indie Charts, even though the band wrote and performed in German.

Manuela Zwingmann left the band after one year, being replaced by Peter Bellendir. This lineup, Huwe/Rickers/Sangster/Ellerbrock/Bellendir was the longest lasting. The single "Reigen" and the album Tocsin were released in 1984, followed by a world tour in 1985. Tocsin reached number 86 on the UK Albums Chart.

The Sequenz EP was essentially a remake of a John Peel session, which had been originally recorded on 30 April 1985 and broadcast on 13 May 1985. The EP contained the tracks "Jahr Um Jahr II", "Autumn" (the band's first song with English lyrics, apart from brief snatches of English that appeared in "Qual", "Young Man" and "Tag für Tag") and "Polarlicht" but omitted "Der Wind", which was played at the Peel sessions.

"Matador", produced by Hugh Cornwell of The Stranglers, was released in 1986. Xmal Deutschland opened for The Stranglers at a concert in Wembley Arena, London, as well as supporting them on their UK tour.

Their follow-up album, Viva was recorded in Hamburg and was released in 1987 through Phonogram, followed by the single "Sickle Moon". Viva contains a large number of English lyrics, including a poem by Emily Dickinson.

After the release of Viva, Manuela Rickers, Fiona Sangster and Peter Bellendir left the group. Anja Huwe and Wolfgang Ellerbrock continued to work with Frank Z (of Abwärts) on guitar. Producer Henry Staroste played keyboards and studio drummer Curt Cress completed the line-up that recorded the 1989 LP Devils, and the singles "Dreamhouse" and "I'll Be Near You". This also proved to be the last release of Xmal Deutschland, showing a change of direction towards mainstream pop.

The group made a few live appearances in 1990 before disbanding later that same year.

== Afterwards ==
Drummer Peter Bellendir died on 3 February 2013 of complications following an organ transplant.

== Media appearances ==
"Incubus Succubus" featured in episode 2 of the second season of Snowpiercer.

== Discography ==
=== Albums ===
- 1983: Fetisch (4AD)
- 1984: Tocsin (4AD)
- 1987: Viva (X-ile (Phonogram))
- 1989: Devils (Metronome)

=== Singles and EPs ===
- 1981: "Schwarze Welt" b/w "Die Wolken", "Großstadtindianer" (ZickZack) 7" single
- 1982: "Incubus Succubus" b/w "Zu Jung Zu Alt", "Blut Ist Liebe" (ZickZack/ZickZack Platten) 12" single
- 1983: "Qual (12" Remix)" b/w "Zelt", "Sehnsucht" (4AD/Virgin/Beggars Banquet) 12" single
- 1983: "Incubus Succubus II" b/w "Vilo" (4AD/DRO/Nexus/Nexus International) 7" and 12" single
- 1984: "Reigen" b/w "Eiland" (DRO/4AD) 7" single
- 1985: "Jahr Um Jahr II" b/w "Autumn", "Polarlicht" -Sequenz (Red Rhino/DRO/Fundamental) 7" and 12" single
- 1986: The Peel Sessions (30.04.85) (Strange Fruit) EP
- 1986: "Matador" b/w "Paho" (Xile/Mercury) 7" and 12" single/maxi-single
- 1987: "Sickle Moon" b/w "Illusion" (Xile/Phonogram/Mercury) 7" and 12" single/maxi-single
- 1989: "Dreamhouse" b/w "Drowned You" (Metronome) 7" and 12" single/CD maxi-single
- 1989: "I'll Be Near You (Radical Remix)" b/w "The Girl in the Iron Mask", "I'll Be Near You (Retouched Radio Version)" (Metronome) 7" single/12" maxi-single/CD maxi-single

=== Compilations ===
- 2024: "Early Singles (1981-1982)" (Sacred Bones Records)
