= Berlin school =

Berlin School may refer to:

- Berlin School of Creative Leadership
- Berlin School of filmmaking
- Berlin School of electronic music
- Berlin School of experimental psychology
- Berliner Modell (Berlin School of Didactic method developed by Paul Heimann (1901–1967))
- Berlin Pleiades (Berlin School of Chess)
