= Viva (Xmal Deutschland album) =

Studio album by Xmal Deutschland
- Released: 1987
- Recorded: Brunwey Studios, Hamburg 1985–86
- Genre: Alternative rock; gothic rock; new wave; dark wave
- Length: 49:47
- Label: X-ile (Phonogram)

Xmal Deutschland chronology
Tocsin (1984)	Viva (1987)	Devils (1989)

Professional ratings
Review scores
Source	Rating
AllMusic	3.5/5 stars

Viva was Xmal Deutschland's third album, released in 1987. "Matador" was produced by the Stranglers's Hugh Cornwell and was released as a single in the UK in 1986.

== Track listing ==
1. "Matador" – 4:00
2. "Eisengrau" – 2:57
3. "Sickle Moon" – 3:36
4. "If Only" – 4:11
5. "Feuerwerk (31-dez)" – 6:02
6. "Illusion (Version)" – 4:06
7. "Morning (Will There Really Be)" – 6:04
8. "Manchmal" – 3:41
9. "Polarlicht" – 3:17
10. "Ozean" – 4:53
11. "Dogma I" – 4:04

=== CD version bonus track ===
12. "4" – 2:56
