= Xero (film) =

- Film poster
- Directed by: Jack the Zipper
- Produced by: Rockford Kabine
- Starring: Jade Starr; Jayme Langford; Franziska Facella; Devi Lynne; Zoe Minx
- Music by: Rockford Kabine
- Release date: 21 June 2010
- Running time: 62 minutes
- Country: Germany

Xero is a 2010 German experimental all-girl pornographic film by American director Jack the Zipper and German composer and producer Rockford Kabine.

== Description ==
Xero is an aesthetic and gloomy trip into a world of lesbian erotic, eschaton phantasies and Japanese zen-tradition. It is both a movie and musical album by composer and producer Rockford Kabine. The movie derives its effect from the close liaison of pictures and sound. Artistic references are the works of Alejandro Jodorowsky and the Japanese Pink film-exploitation genre, as well as the soundtracks of Ennio Morricone.

== Awards ==
- 2011: AVN Award-Nomination: Best All-Girl-Release
- 2011: AVN Award-Nomination: Best Art Direction
- 2011: AVN Award-Nomination: Best Music Soundtrack
- 2011: AVN Award-Nomination: Best Tease Performance (Jayme Langford)
- 2011: AltPorn Award: Best Feature AltPorn Video
