= Fetisch =

Studio album by Xmal Deutschland
- Released: 11 April 1983
- Recorded: Blackwing Studios, London 1983
- Genre: Post-punk; gothic rock
- Length: 39:31
- Label: 4AD
- Producer: Ivo Watts-Russell and Xmal Deutschland

Xmal Deutschland chronology
Fetisch (1983)	Tocsin (1984)

Singles from Fetisch
- 1. "Qual" Released: June 1983

Fetisch is the debut album by German post-punk band Xmal Deutschland, released in April 1983 on the 4AD label.

== Critical reception ==
Professional ratings
Review scores
Source	Rating
AllMusic	2.5/5 stars

== Track listing ==
All tracks are written by Xmal Deutschland

No.	Title	Length
1.	"Qual"	3:50
2.	"Geheimnis"	3:19
3.	"Young Man"	3:18
4.	"In Der Nacht"	3:44
5.	"Orient"	4:06
6.	"Hand in Hand"	3:08
7.	"Kämpfen"	2:48
8.	"Danthem"	4:59
9.	"Boomerang"	3:46
10.	"Stummes Kind"	5:15

Bonus tracks on CD reissue
No.	Title	Length
11.	"Qual" (12" Version)	6:41
12.	"Zeit"	4:06
13.	"Sehnsucht"	4:40

== Personnel ==
Musicians

- Vocals: Anja Huwe
- Guitars: Manuela Rickers
- Keyboards: Fiona Sangster
- Bass: Wolfgang Ellerbrock
- Drums: Manuela Zwingmann

Production

- Produced by Ivo Watts-Russell and Xmal Deutschland
- Engineered by John Fryer
- Design by 23 Envelope
