= Devils (Xmal Deutschland album) =

Studio album by Xmal Deutschland
- Released: 1989
- Genre: Alternative rock; new wave; dark wave; dream pop
- Length: 46:14
- Label: Metronome Records

Xmal Deutschland chronology
Viva (1987)	Devils (1989)

Devils was Xmal Deutschland's fourth and final album, released in 1989. "Devils" was recorded at Hammertone studio, Düsseldorf and Pilot studios, Munich by Henry Staroste. Mixed at Chateau du Pape, Hamburg by Paul Corkett.

== Track listing ==
1. "I'll Be Near You" – 3:38
2. "Searchlights" – 4:20
3. "You Broke My Heart" – 4:28
4. "Sleepwalker" – 3:50
5. "When Devils Come" – 3:58
6. "Heavens and Seas" – 3:51
7. "Dreamhouse" – 3:38
8. "I Push It Harder" – 3:50
9. "I Should Have Known" – 4:06
10. "All in My Hands" – 4:12
11. "Drowned You" – 2:58
12. "Dreamhouse Theme" – 3:25

== Personnel ==
- Anja Huwe - vocal
- Frank Ziegert - guitar
- Wesley Plass - guitar
- Henry Staroste - keyboards
- Wolfgang Ellerbrock - bass
- Curt Cress - drums
