= Berlin Model =

German early-childhood education model

The Berlin Model (German: Berliner Modell) was developed by Paul Heimann (1901–1967) and is also known as the “Teaching-learning theory of education" (German: lehr-lern-theoretische Didaktik) in order to distinguish it from the "developmental education theory" (German: bildungstheoretische Didaktik) of Wolfgang Klafki. Heinemann considered Klafki to be thinking in purely ideal terms with his humanistic approach, and instead created a practical model for making education decisions. Heimann’s model is intended to enable teachers to analyze their lessons on a purely empirical and objective basis to make more transparent decisions. It was also intended to assist teachers to consider as many factors as possible in planning their lessons. This would permit specific and scheduled learning.

== The model ==
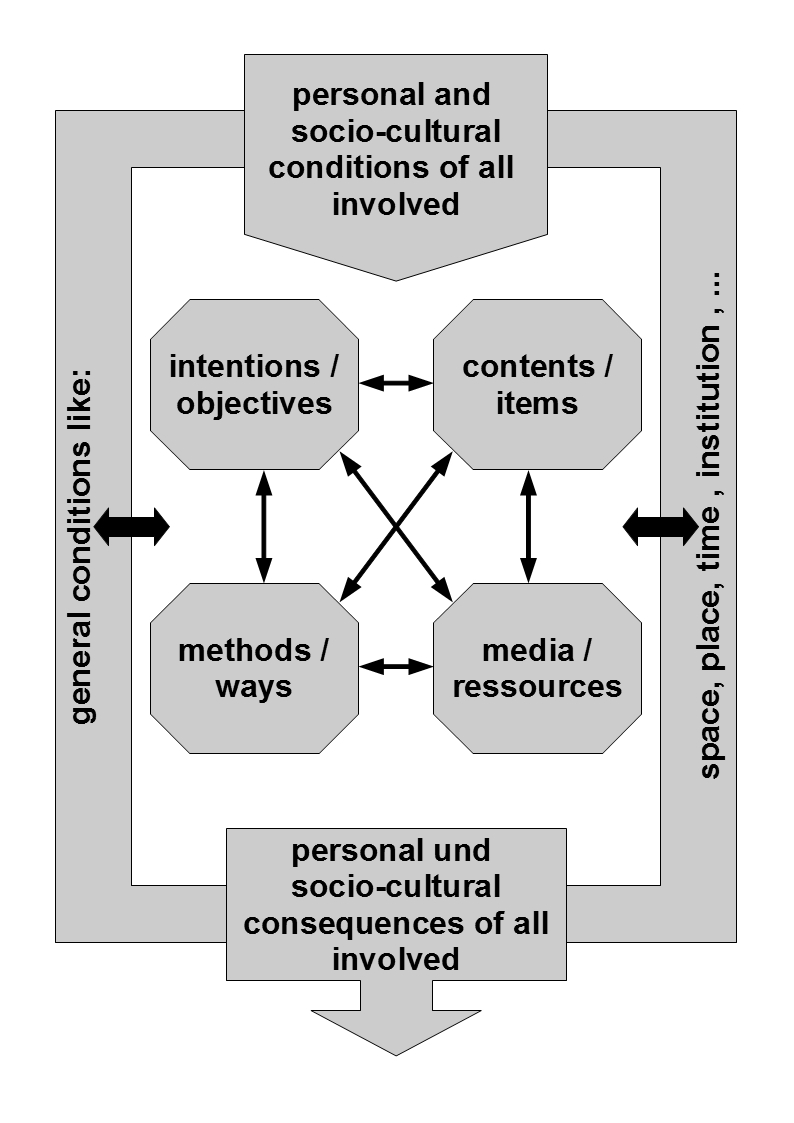
Berliner Modell

The goal of the “Berlin Model” is to support the process of making useful decisions with regard to the questions “why”, “whereto”, “what” and “how” within a group, considering all the different conditions and situations. It offers support for analysis and planning of single steps and for subsequent reflection and evaluation of work units or group works. By systematic evaluation of teaching on an empirical basis, Heimann established “formal constants” (also known as categories) of lessons, occurring time-independent in teaching. These identified categories (teaching factors) can serve as a guideline to lesson planning. Heimann identifies six of these constants within two fields:

- Two conditional factors (field of conditions)
  - anthropological-psychological conditions of each attendant
  - personal socio-cultural conditions of all involved
- Four decisional factors (field of decisions)
  - Intentions/objectives
  - Content/items
  - Methods/techniques
  - Resources/media

=== Conditional factors ===
- The anthropological-psychological or anthropogenic conditions of each attendant:
  - Which learning background does the particular pupil have?
  - Which stage of development do the individuals have?
  - Which attitude/motivation, receptivity?
  - Where do they live and what follows from that? (attitudes, skills, learning styles)
  - Existing knowledge and experience of all involved?
  - How is the group composed? Who leads and has influence? Positive or negative group climate?
  - What about the behavior and relationship of the attendants and teachers?
  - Which interest do they probably have?
- The socio-cultural conditions of all involved:
  - Where does the meeting take place?
  - Which spatial conditions do exist?
  - How much time is at hand?
  - What else is unaltered given?
  - Which external persons have influence or control rights? (e.g. janitor switches off the current)
  - How old are the involved persons or which state of development do they have? Male or female?
  - What expectations do the parents, the society or the institution/school have?
  - What is the concept the institution/school is based on?

=== Decisional factors ===
- The contents/items dealt with:
  - Which contents should be dealt with?
  - Do the contents fit the aims and vice versa?
  - How exactly do the contents have to be filled (limited/enlarged) so that they do not pass the requirements of those involved?
  - Are there any contradictions with regard to the general conditions?
- The methods and the way the contents are treated and aims could be reached:
  - If I bring to mind all requirements of those involved, the general conditions and the intended objectives and contents, which ideas to achieve them come into my mind?
  - Which steps do I find?
  - What am I supposed to do, say or offer? How to arrange, structure or present the content?
  - Do I eventually have to modify my intentions/objectives because I do not find a way to achieve them? Or do I have to reflect on my decision regarding the content, the general conditions or my personal requirements? (e.g. by acquiring more information)
- The resources/media needed to go this way:
  - Do I have all required resources/media? Or do I have to change the way/method because they are not available?
  - Do the media fulfill the requirements of those involved, the objectives, the contents etc.?

=== Main statements ===
The main statements of this model are:

- All six factors are correlated, and among these strict interdependence rules. Each factor has to be treated with regard to the others.
- The model deals with planning (of a meeting or a group lesson) as a system of correlated decisions: Each element refers to each other and so decisions in one field have consequences in all other fields. If I made my decision in one field, I have to reflect all other decisions and check whether they fit overall interaction.
- The general conditions have to be taken into consideration also, respectively, according to my objective, I have to try to change the general conditions.
- The conditional and decisional factors are mentioned in a specific order. One does not necessarily have to follow that order during planning because all factors are interactive. In principle, one can start in each field and refer decisions in other fields to this.
- After a planned meeting has been held consequences and results occur for all persons involved: aims have been reached or have not been reached, changes have taken place or have not taken place. All results have to be taken into consideration and influence the planning of the following meetings accordingly.

=== Development ===
The model was advanced to the “Hamburger Modell” in the 1980s by Wolfgang Schulz, a former associate of Heimann. The planning model of Heimann becomes an action model for “emancipatory appreciable and professional pedagogic teaching”. Schulz avoids the strict phenomenological descriptively analysis of teaching and develops a normative model of sceptical teaching which allows pupils to get rid of unnecessary control and act in maximum self-control.

=== Literature ===
- Paul Heimann, Gunter Otto, Wolfgang Schulz: “Unterricht: Analyse und Planung” (Hrsg.: Blumenthal, Alfred; Osterman, Wilhelm), Hannover, Schroedel Schulbuchverlag. 10. unveränderte Auflage, 1979
