= Whirlpool Productions =

- Origin: Cologne, Germany
- Genre: House
- Years active: 1991–present
- Members: Eric D. Clark; Justus Köhncke; Hans Nieswandt

Whirlpool Productions is a German house music project formed in 1991 from Cologne, consisting of musicians and producers Eric D. Clark, Justus Köhncke and Hans Nieswandt.

They are best known for "From: Disco To: Disco", which in 2025 was voted the No. 8 best disco song by a jury for Radioeins. Their single "The Cold Song" peaked at No. 80 in the official German charts on 16 September 1996.

== Musical career ==
Whirlpool Productions are known for their unique, experimental sound that shaped the style of bands like Sensorama or Egoexpress. Their disco hit "From Disco to Disco" was a big success. In summer 1997, it was a number 1 for 9 weeks in Italy. The musicians were also journalists in the old editorial staff of Spex music magazine, and therefore were also interested in the theoretical side of their activity. Today, they appear mostly as DJs. Hans Nieswandt talks in his book Plus Minus Acht about his memories of house in the '90s.

== Discography ==
=== Albums ===
- Brian de Palma (1995)
- Dense Music (1996)
- ??? (1998)
- Lifechange (2001)

=== Singles ===
- "Fly High"/"Gimme" (1993)
- "I Think that Maybe I'm Dreaming" (1994) (with T'n'I under the title The Dream Team EP)
- The Immunity Syndrome EP (1995)
- "Non-Stop Trancin"/"Let Yourself Go" (1994)
- "Harvest"/"Moon Huh" (1995)
- "Cold Song" (1996)
- "From Disco to Disco" (1996)
- "Crazy Music" (1998)
- "Lifechange" (2001)

=== Remixes (selection) ===
- Die Helfende Hand - "Wo sind die Partys" (1993)
- D'Cypher - "Return of Dr. Mabuse" (1993)
- Microbots - "I Don't Know What to Expect" (1995)
- Army of Lovers - "Life is Fantastic" (1995)
