= L'Age D'Or (record label) =

German independent music label based in Hamburg

L'Age d'Or
- Parent company: Lado Musik GmbH
- Founded: 1988
- Defunct: 2007
- Genre: Independent music, electronic music
- Country of origin: Germany
- Location: Hamburg
- Official website: lado.de

L’Age d’Or was a German independent music label based in Hamburg, which has played an important role in creating the Hamburger Schule and was the parent label of Ladomat 2000.

The label was founded in 1988 by Carol von Rautenkranz and Kolossale Jugend guitarist Pascal Fuhlbrügge, who together had already been organizing concerts in the post-NDW music scene of Hamburg for some time. They were joined by Thorsten "Taucher" Weßel from the band Ostzonensuppenwürfelmachenkrebs, who later became a co-owner. Fuhlbrügge left the label in 1993. In 1994 Ladomat 2000 was launched by Charlotte Goltermann as a sublabel to also release electronic music. Both labels went out of business in 2007.

The releases on L'Age D'Or were formative for the Hamburger Schule. Ladomat 2000 reflected this scene's growing interest in rave, techno and house music. Tocotronic, Die Sterne and the house music project Whirlpool Productions reached some commercial success in the mid-nineties.

== L'Age D'Or artists ==
- beigeGT
- Boxhamsters
- Carnival of Souls
- Das Neue Brot
- Der schwarze Kanal
- Die Aeronauten
- Die-Gants
- Die Regierung
- Die Sterne
- Eagle Seagull
- Fink
- Guz
- Hallelujah Ding Dong Happy Happy!
- Huah!
- Jonas
- Schorsch Kamerun
- Kissin Cousins
- Kolossale Jugend
- Mastino
- Milch
- Ostzonensuppenwürfelmachenkrebs
- Leichter Teile
- Hans Platzgumer
- Pop Goes The Pope
- Richard von der Schulenburg
- Spillsbury
- Stella
- Superpunk
- The Robocop Kraus
- Tilman Rossmy
- Timid Tiger
- Tocotronic
- Trashmonkeys
- Von Spar
- We Smile
- Workshop
- Arne Zank solo

== Ladomat 2000 artists ==
- Arj Snoek
- Commercial Breakup
- Eric D. Clark
- Egoexpress
- Forever Sweet
- Milch
- Netto Houz
- Phantom/Ghost
- Sensorama
- Subtle Tease
- Turner
- Whirlpool Productions
- Remute

== Sources ==
- lado.de - official website
- L'Age D'Or discography at Discogs
- Ladomat 2000 discography at Discogs
