= Eric D. Clark =

American musician (born 1966)

Eric D. Clark (born 1966) is a US-American musician. After growing up in California, he moved to Europe. While living in Cologne, he made a major contribution to the city's music scene in the 1990s though his clubs and DJing work, blending disco and house music. He formed Whirlpool Productions with Justus Köhncke and Hans Nieswandt, which had hits in a number of European countries, including "From Disco to Disco", which reached number 1 in the Italian charts.

While continuing to release records and perform with Whirlpool Productions, he also released a number of solo albums, including 1998's Für Dancefloor (on Ladomat 2000) and E=dC2 on Kompakt in 2007. Single releases include 2001's "Another Night, Another Disco" (on Sony BMG). He worked with Amanda Lear and Giorgio Moroder to produce a new version of Moroder's track "From Here to Eternity". As a producer, he has worked with artists including Angie Reed, Peaches, Märtini Bros, Mark Stewart, Mouse on Mars, and Tiefschwarz.
