= Markus Mehr =

- Origin: Augsburg, Bavaria, Germany
- Genres: Ambient music, Experimental music, Soundart, Phonographie
- Years active: 1989–present
- Labels: Hidden Shoal Recordings, Gruenrekorder
- Website: Official website

Markus Mehr (born 1965 in Augsburg, Bavaria) is a German electronic music composer and sound artist.

== History ==
Mehr played guitar in the new wave band The Unemployed Ministers from 1989 until their dissolution in 1997. In 2001, he began a solo project under the name Aroma, releasing three albums over five years.

As of 2008, Mehr has been writing and performing under his own name as an electronic composer. In 2010, he signed to the Australian record label Hidden Shoal Recordings.

Mehr has been performing live under his own name since 2009, playing shows in his native Germany as well as in Netherlands, Dubai, Sweden, Italy, Marokko and Canada. He often collaborates with visual artist Stefanie Sixt in his shows.

Mehr and Sixt have also collaborated on a number of audiovisual and sound art installations. In 2013, Mehr scored the theatrical production First Life. Since 2014 he works very often with field recordings and hydrophones to use these materials as a sound source for his electro acoustic compositions. The album Dyschronia was part of the A Closer Listening Top Ten 2017. On October the 15th 2018 he released the album Liquid Empires which contains only music made out of underwater recordings. The performance EDIT 1/0/0/0 was a commission work for the 1000 year anniversary of the Moritzkirche in Augsburg. After two years of composing and preparing, two shows took place on Friday 20th of September 2019 . The Album Brief Conversations was released on the 12th of May. It is an ode to the acoustic properties of the spaces we listen within. From 17th of June to the 18th of July 2021 Mehr´s installation work Pressure premiered at the Höhmannhaus, Augsburg (a division of the Museum for Contemporary Art). Release date for the album with the same title was the 1st of April 2022 for the first time on Gruenrekorder. On October 26, his sound installation Supra made its debut at the gallery arToxin, Munich. A limited vinyl edition of this work was released by Gruenrkorder. In February 2025, the album Hole In The Sea was released, a collaboration with double bassist Joseph Warner under the moniker V_on.

== Discography ==
As Unemployed Ministers:

- Spirit (1989)
- Selfish (1992)
- Parasite (1994)
- Not Kaputt Really (1994)

As Aroma:

- What Do You Mean Aroma Approaching? (2001)
- The Current Music Of ... (2004)
- A Hole Called Rock 'n' Roll (2006)

As Markus Mehr:

- Lava (2010)
- In (2012)
- On (2012)
- Off (2013)
- Off"- Live in Bari (2013)
- Binary Rooms (2014)
- To Set The River On Fire (2014)
- In The Palm Of Your Hand -EP (2015)
- Re-Directed (2016)
- Dyschronia (2017)
- Liquid Empires (2018)
- Brief Conversations (2020)
- Pressure (2022)
- Supra (2024)
- Hole In The Sea w/V_on (2025)

== Performance ==
- Synchron (2010)
- Komo (2011)
- Transit (2011)
- First Live - Ein Melodram (2013)
- B/C/H/I/J (2013)
- Sublimity Water (2013)
- Irrigatis (2013)
- Items/Stille (2013)
- Re-Directed (2015)
- Nach Hause Kommen (Bertold Brecht Lyric) (2016)
- Dyschronia (2017)
- EDIT 1/0/0/0 (2019)

== Installation ==
- From A to B to A (2014)
- Wiegenlieder aus Schurkenstaaten (2017)
- Pressure (2021)
- Freedom Love & Observation (2023)
- Supra (2024)
