= Golden Boy (electronic musician) =

Swiss visual artist

- Born: Stefan Altenburger; 1968 (age 56–57)
- Origin: Zürich, Switzerland
- Genres: Electroclash, neo-electro, techno, electropop
- Occupation(s): Artist, DJ, songwriter

Stefan Altenburger (Zürich, 1968) is a Swiss visual artist who is best known as musician Golden Boy for his collaborations with Miss Kittin such as the club hit "Rippin Kittin."

== Career ==
A resident of Zurich, Switzerland, Altenburger first found recognition as a visual artist, winning the 1991 Swiss Federal Prize for Design and the 1994 Swiss Federal Prize for the Arts. His gallery shows traveled the world, getting him published in a multitude of European publications. However, in addition to his visual work in design and photography, Altenburger also began producing electronic dance music in the '90s as Klettermax and Golden Boy. Source Records released his self-titled EP as Klettermax in 1998; and his Golden Boy album Or was released in 2001, featuring vocal contributions from Miss Kittin.

== Discography ==
=== Albums ===
- Or (with Miss Kittin) (2001)

=== Singles ===
Year	Title	Peak chart positions						Album
Year	Title	UK	UK Dance	BEL Tip (FL)	BEL Tip (WA)	DEU	ES	Album
2002	"Rippin Kittin" (Golden Boy with Miss Kittin)	67	1	15	18	95	11	Or
2003	"Autopilot" (Golden Boy with Miss Kittin)	—	—	—	—	—	—	Or

=== Remixes ===
- PeterLicht – ("Heiterkeit") (2001)
- Knarf Rellöm & DJ Patex / Saalschutz – ("Little Big City") (2003)

== See also ==
- List of electroclash bands and artists
