= Schorsch Kamerun =

German musician

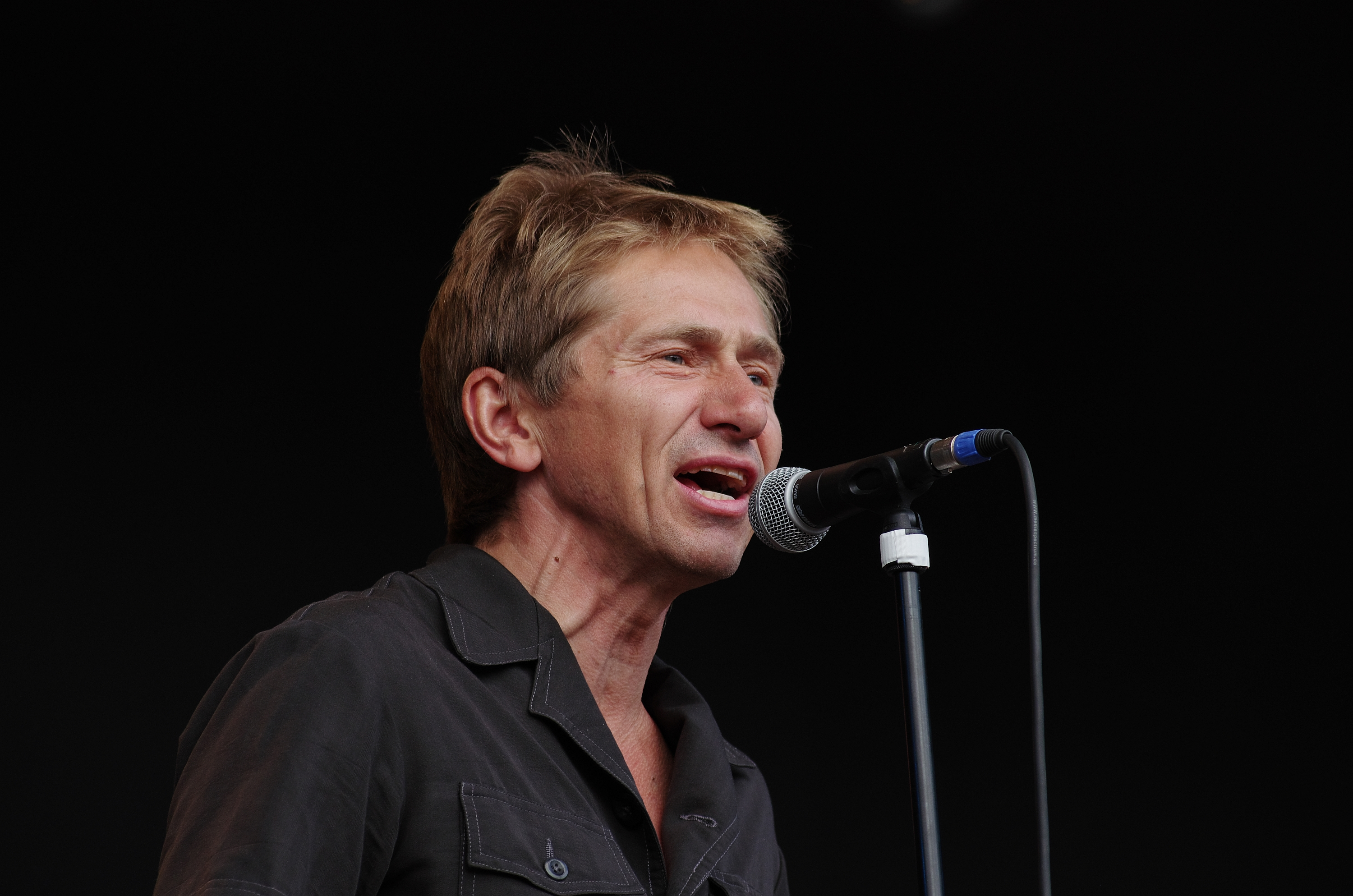
- Born: 1963 (age 62–63); Timmendorfer Strand, Germany
- Occupations: Musician, singer, author and theatre director

Schorsch Kamerun (born 1963), whose real name is Thomas Sehl, is a German musician, singer, author, theatre director, and club proprietor. His stage name is a parody of the name of the singer of American punk band Dead Kennedys, called Jello Biafra.

== Biography ==
Kamerun was born in Timmendorfer Strand. He is best known as the founding member and lead singer of Die Goldenen Zitronen, a political punk band from Hamburg. In recent years, he has also worked as an author and director for the theater and has staged several of his plays at renowned theatres around Germany, Austria and Switzerland, such as the Volksbuehne in Berlin.

Kamerun is also co-founder, with Rocko Schamoni and others, of the Golden Pudel nightclub in Hamburg, which is well known as a center of the Hamburger Schule movement in German alternative rock.

He also released some solo albums, radio dramas and recorded songs for a few compilation albums.

In 2007 Kamerun performed in Raymond Pettibon's and Oliver Augst's musical The Whole World Is Watching (with Keiji Haino and Marcel Daemgen) at the MaerzMusik festival of the Berliner Festspiele.

== Discography ==
- 1996: Warum Ändern Schlief
- 1997: Now: Sex Image
- 2000: Schorsch Kamerun (as Sylvester Boy) - Monsters Rule The World!

== Radio Drama ==
- Hanns Eisler (1898–1962) - Hollywood Elegien, WDR 2003
- Eisstadt, WDR 2005
- Ein Menschenbild, das in seiner Summe null ergibt, WDR 2006
