= Tocotronic =

German rock band

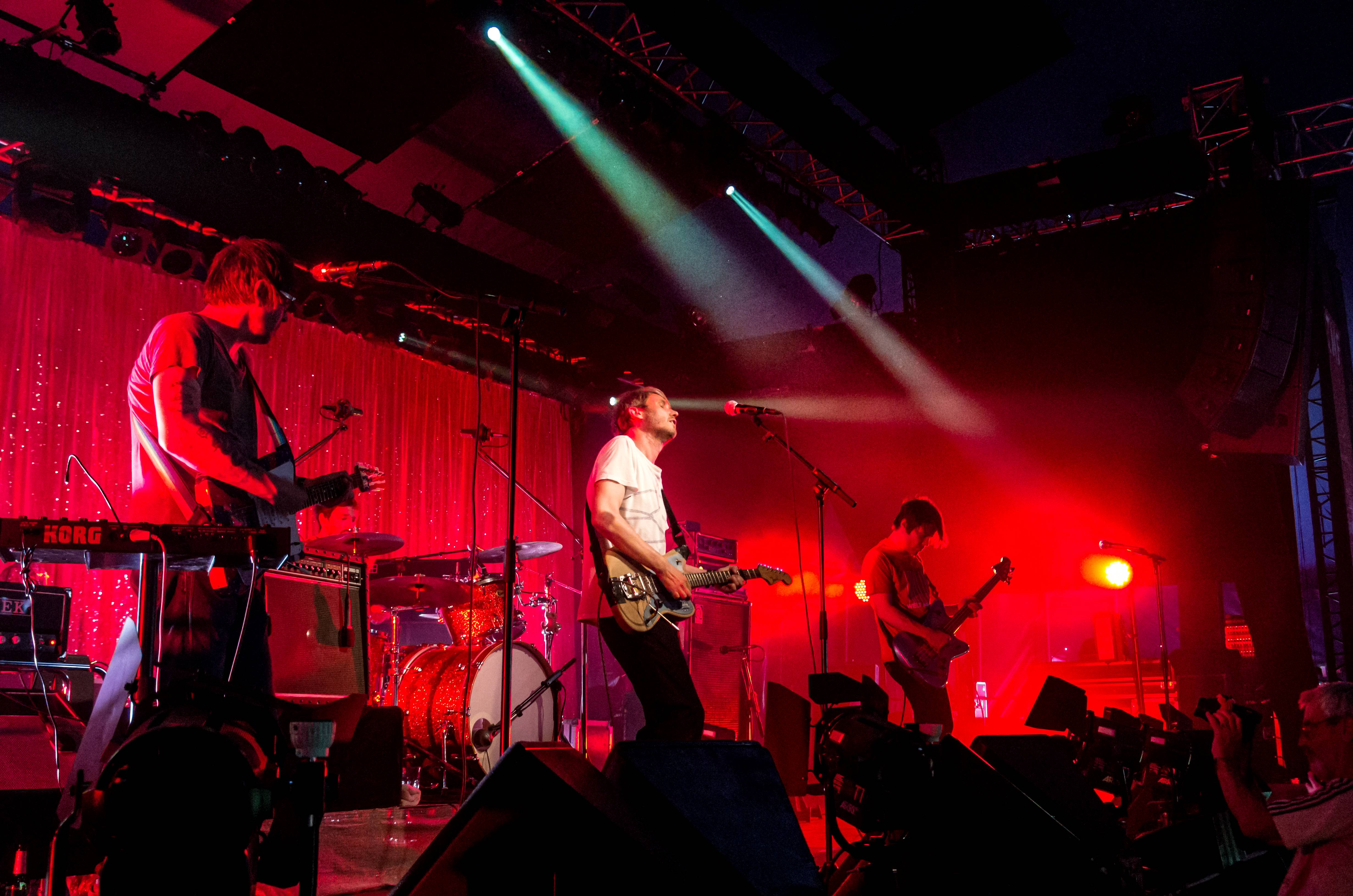
- Tocotronic at Zelt Musik Festival 2015

Background information
- Origin: Hamburg, Germany
- Genres: Indie rock, alternative rock, punk rock
- Years active: 1993–present
- Labels: L'Age D'Or, Vertigo, Rock-o-Tronic Records
- Members: Dirk von Lowtzow; Jan Müller; Arne Zank; Rick McPhail
- Website: tocotronic.de

Tocotronic is a German rock band formed in 1993. Similar to Blumfeld or Die Sterne they are considered a part of the Hamburger Schule (Hamburg School) movement. They are influential for bands such as Wir sind Helden.

== History ==
Tocotronic were signed by L'Age D'Or, a German independent record label situated in Hamburg, in 1994 after quickly gaining popularity in the local scene. Their early style consisted of ironic sloganeering ("I want to be part of a youth movement") and almost diary-like songwriting, paired with a lo-fi rock sound with elements of punk rock and grunge.

In 1995, Tocotronic released their debut album Digital ist besser (Digital is better). It was noted for its perceptive lyrics and raw, unpolished sound. Frank König described the album in SWR1 Milestones as "grungy, punky, furious and yearning". Some of its best known songs include "Wir sind hier nicht in Seattle, Dirk", "Die Idee ist gut, doch die Welt noch nicht bereit", as well as the title track "Digital ist besser". The final track, "Über Sex kann man nur auf Englisch singen", alludes to a contemporary discussion about German-language songwriting. Bayerischer Rundfunk called Digital ist besser "a milestone in German pop history" in 2010. Tocotronic's second album, Nach der verlorenen Zeit (After the Lost Time), followed only a few months later.

Wir kommen um uns zu beschweren, released in 1996, was the first of their albums to hit the German charts. Over time the music became more complex and their lyrics less direct, resulting in a sound that was compared to that of Pavement on Tocotronic's 1999 album K.O.O.K. The self-titled "White Album", released in 2002, features dreamlike songs; metaphoric, heavily produced, highly polished, it completes a slow but steady course away from their early works ("eins zu eins ist jetzt vorbei" – "one-to-one is over now").

In January 2005, Tocotronic released Pure Vernunft darf niemals siegen, their seventh album, and the first with Rick McPhail as a full bandmember.

In July 2007, Tocotronic released their eighth studio album, Kapitulation. Introducing the album in Hamburg, Dirk von Lowtzow described Kapitulation as "the most beautiful word in the German language". Richard Kämmerlings said that in the context of contemporary history, the album's conception of capitulation as liberation has a "distinctly anti-nationalist thrust". Their long-time label L'age D'or was dissolved in 2007, and consequently they released Kapitulation on Vertigo Berlin, a sub-label of Universal Music.

Their ninth studio album, Schall & Wahn, was released in January 2010 and became their first number-one record. It formed the final installment of what became known as their "Berlin Trilogy" (in reference to the Berlin Trilogy by David Bowie).

Wie Wir Leben Wollen, was released on 25 January 2013 and Tocotronic (commonly known as "Das Rote Album", or "The Red Album") was released on 1 May 2015. Nie wieder Krieg came out in January 2022 and was their thirteenth release.

Despite never being overly commercially successful, Tocotronic have a steady fanbase in Germany and their records are regularly reviewed and acclaimed in mainstream newspapers and music magazines alike. The current band members and positions are Jan Müller (bass), Arne Zank (drums), Dirk von Lowtzow (rhythm guitar, vocals), and, since 2004, Rick McPhail (lead guitar, keyboard).

== Discography ==
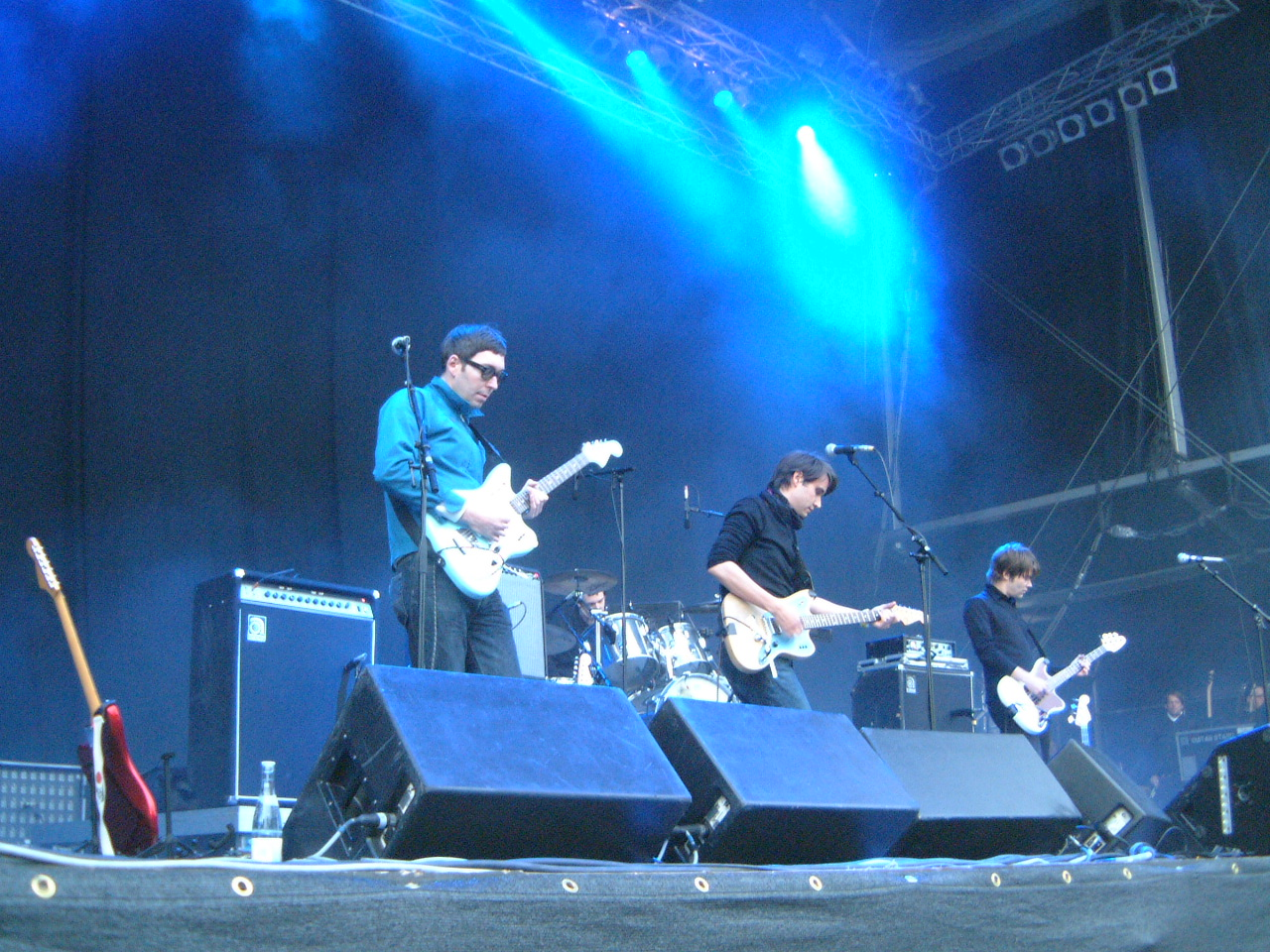
Tocotronic in 2005

=== Studio albums ===
- 1995: Digital ist besser ("Digital Is Better")
- 1995: Nach der verlorenen Zeit ("After the Lost Time")
- 1996: Wir kommen um uns zu beschweren ("We are Coming to Complain")
- 1997: Es ist egal, aber ("It Doesn't Matter, But")
- 1999: K.O.O.K.
- 1999: K.O.O.K. (English Version)
- 2002: Tocotronic
- 2005: Pure Vernunft darf niemals siegen ("Pure Reason Can Never Win")
- 2007: Kapitulation ("Capitulation")
- 2010: Schall und Wahn (literally "Sound and Delusion", Schall und Wahn being the title of the German translation of William Faulkner's The Sound and the Fury) (GER: #1)
- 2013: Wie wir leben wollen ("How We Want to Live")
- 2015: Tocotronic (Das rote Album) ("Tocotronic (The Red Album)")
- 2018: Die Unendlichkeit ("Infinity")
- 2022: Nie wieder Krieg ("No More War")
- 2025: Golden Years

=== Best of, live, remixes ===
- 1998: Live in Roskilde (limited edition of 2222 CDs, mailorder only)
- 1998: The Hamburg Years (export only)
- 1998: Tocotronic – Tocotronics (VHS/PAL)
- 2000: K.O.O.K. - Variationen (remixes done by a number of artists)
- 2004: Tocotronic – 10th Anniversary (CD/DVD)
- 2005: The Best of Tocotronic (CD/double-CD)
- 2008: Kapitulation Live
- 2013: >20<

=== Singles and EPs ===
- 1994: Meine Freundin und ihr Freund (7"; My girlfriend and her boyfriend)
- 1995: Freiburg (live, 7")
- 1995: Ich möchte Teil einer Jugendbewegung sein (12"; I want to be part of a youth movement)
- 1995: You are quite cool (7")
- 1996: Die Welt kann mich nicht mehr verstehen (12"/CD; The world can't understand me anymore)
- 1996: Split with Chokebore (7")
- 1996: Split with Christoph de Babalon (7")
- 1997: Dieses Jahr (12"/CD; This year)
- 1997: Sie wollen uns erzählen (12"/CD; They want to tell us)
- 1997: Themenabend (Live In Dresden, 7", limited edition: 500 pieces Red Vinyl; Theme evening)
- 1998: Split with Fuck (7")
- 1999: Jackpot (12"/CD)
- 1999: Let There Be Rock (12"/CD)
- 1999: Live auf dem Petersberg (7", limited edition: 1000 pieces – 500 Clear / 500 Black Vinyl; Live on Petersberg)
- 2000: Freiburg V 3.0 (12"/CD, with Console)
- 2000: Variationen I + II (2 EPs; Variations)
- 2002: Hi Freaks I + II (2×12"/CD)
- 2002: This Boy Is Tocotronic (12"/CD)
- 2005: Aber hier leben, nein danke (12"/CD; But living here, no, thanks)
- 2005: Gegen den Strich (12"/CD); Against the grain)
- 2005: Pure Vernunft darf niemals siegen Remixes (12"/CD on Kompakt Records; Pure Reason Nust Never Prevail)
- 2007: Kapitulation (12"/CD; Surrender)
- 2007: Imitationen (12"/CD; Imitations)
- 2007: Sag alles ab (7", limited edition: 1.500 pieces, hand-numbered; Call off everything)
- 2010: Macht es nicht selbst (7"/12"; Don't do it yourselves)
- 2010: Im Zweifel für den Zweifel (7": When in Doubt, for the Doubt)
- 2010: Die Folter endet nie (7": The Torture never ends)
- 2013: Auf dem Pfad der Dämmerung (7": On the Path of Twilight)
- 2013: Ich will für dich nüchtern bleiben (7": I want to stay sober for you)
- 2013: Warte auf mich auf dem Grund des Swimmingpools (7": Wait for me on the Bottom of the Swimming Pool)
- 2015: Prolog (7": Prologue)
- 2015: Die Erwachsenen (7": The Adults)
- 2015: Zucker (7": Sugar)

=== Compilations ===
- Four-beat Rhythm: The Writings of Wilhelm Reich
