= Hamburger Schule =

German music movement

The Hamburger Schule (German for 'Hamburg School') is a music movement current in Germany during the 1980s and early 1990s. With some active bands and artists it is still present. It took up traditions of Neue Deutsche Welle and combined them with elements of indie rock, punk, grunge, experimental pop, and intellectual lyrics. It established new grounds for the use of German language in pop music.

== Introduction ==
As the name indicates, the movement was initially carried by Hamburg based bands like Cpt. Kirk &., Kolossale Jugend, Ostzonensuppenwürfelmachenkrebs, Die Erde, Blumfeld, Tocotronic, Die Sterne, Huah!, and Die Goldenen Zitronen. Their music didn't necessarily sound similar, but was characterised by lyrics in German language (not a given in Germany) that gave voice to social criticism and were based on post-modern theory. Consequently, it was lauded by the leftist trade press (especially Spex magazine). The artists themselves didn't initially perceive these similarities to be particularly important and denied the existence of a homogeneous movement. However, social links and political cooperations suggest that it wasn't unreasonable to view it as that. Furthermore, it could be surmised that the term Hamburger Schule is a pun on the so-called Frankfurter Schule ('Frankfurt School') which is a school of neo-Marxist social theory, social research, and philosophy, centered at the Institute for Social Research (Institut für Sozialforschung) of the University of Frankfurt am Main in Germany. However, it seems more likely to be simply a clever knock at the need for legitimacy, by referencing the way all art movements are titled in German (e.g. Wiener Schule, Berliner Schule, Österreichische Schule, New Yorker Schule, etc.).

== Beginnings ==
In the late 1980s, a new musical scene was emerging in Hamburg comprising a number of bands that sung in German but that had no record deals (with the exception of Die Antwort). To remedy this situation and to give the new style a platform, the record label L'Age D'Or was established in October 1988 by Carol von Rautenkranz and Pascal Fuhlbrügge. They signed contracts with many bands and published numerous albums. Many of the albums were produced by Chris von Rautenkranz, Carol's brother, in the Soundgarden recording studio in Hamburg. Another label that influenced the emerging genre was Alfred Hilsberg's What's So Funny About?, which published the first albums by Blumfeld, Cpt. Kirk &., and Die Erde.

Another significant representative of Hamburger Schule was Andreas Mand.

Soon, however, the Hamburger Schule was not restricted to Hamburg anymore. In particular, a local scene of germanophone bands had developed in the small town of Bad Salzuflen in Eastern Westphalia, which was centered on the label Fast Weltweit. Founders were Frank Werner, Frank Spilker (of the band Die Sterne), Michael Girke, Bernadette La Hengst (of Die Braut haut ins Auge) and Jochen Distelmeyer (then of Bienenjäger, later Blumfeld). They got in contact with the Hamburg scene through Bernd Begemann who was a native of Bad Salzuflen but moved to Hamburg where he established his band Die Antwort. This led to various gigs in Hamburg for bands from the Fast Weltweit label, eventually causing many other artists to move to Hamburg.

Another first-generation Hamburger Schule band, Die Regierung, was based in Hamburg for a long time, but originated from Essen.

== Rise and fall ==
By the mid 1990s, three bands met with great commercial success: Blumfeld, Die Sterne, and Tocotronic. The Hamburger Schule became known as the epitome of German indie pop music. When other German guitar bands, whose music and lyrics were of a different style, they were able to profit from this success while spurring an entirely new indie pop scene. The Hamburger Schule began to be marginalised by a movement which it had helped to create.

Other artists that are considered part of the Hamburger Schule are Milch, Rocko Schamoni and the 'Mobylettes'. But as time went by, the term eventually encompassed such a broad spectrum of musical content that it could hardly be associated with a particular musical genre anymore. As several bands have started to sing in foreign languages, it has begun to lose any meaning it once had.

== Revival ==
By the end of the 1990s, there emerged a new wave of German guitar music with intellectual aspirations. Examples for this new generation of artists, who clearly tie in with the Hamburger Schule tradition, are Spillsbury, Kettcar, Erdmöbel, Kajak, Justin Balk, Virginia Jetzt!, Astra Kid, Modus Noa, Marr and Tomte. They display a new musical homogeneity of punk-influenced guitar pop.

Several small labels have sprung up to support this new musical current. Arguably the most important one is the Hamburg-based label Grand Hotel van Cleef which, like L'Age D'Or seeks to be an enabler for local bands. It was established in September 2002 by Tomte's Thees Uhlmann and Kettcar's Marcus Wiebusch and Reimer Bustorff.

== List of Hamburger Schule bands and solo artists ==
This list includes music groups and solo artists from the Hamburger Schule and its surroundings. The chronological focus is mainly between the end of the 1980s and the mid-1990s. It also includes bands and solo musicians, who were active before the emergence of the music movement in the 1980s and are regarded as its pioneers (e.g. Kolossale Jugend or Cpt. Kirk &.) and forerunners (e.g. Die Goldenen Zitronen).

- Bernd Begemann
- Blumfeld
- Brüllen
- Concord
- Cpt. Kirk &.
- Das Neue Brot
- Die Braut haut ins Auge
- Die Erde
- Die Fünf Freunde
- Die Goldenen Zitronen
- Die Regierung
- Die Sterne
- Egoexpress
- Hallelujah Ding Dong Happy Happy!
- Hans Platzgumer
- Huah!
- JaKönigJa
- Kissin Cousins
- Knarf Rellöm
- Kolossale Jugend
- Lassie Singers
- Mastino
- Milch
- Ostzonensuppenwürfelmachenkrebs
- Pascal Fuhlbrügge
- Popken
- Rocko Schamoni
- Sand11
- Schorsch Kamerun
- Stella
- Tilman Rossmy
- Tocotronic
- Vincent's Price
- We Smile
- Workshop
