= Die Goldenen Zitronen =

German punk rock

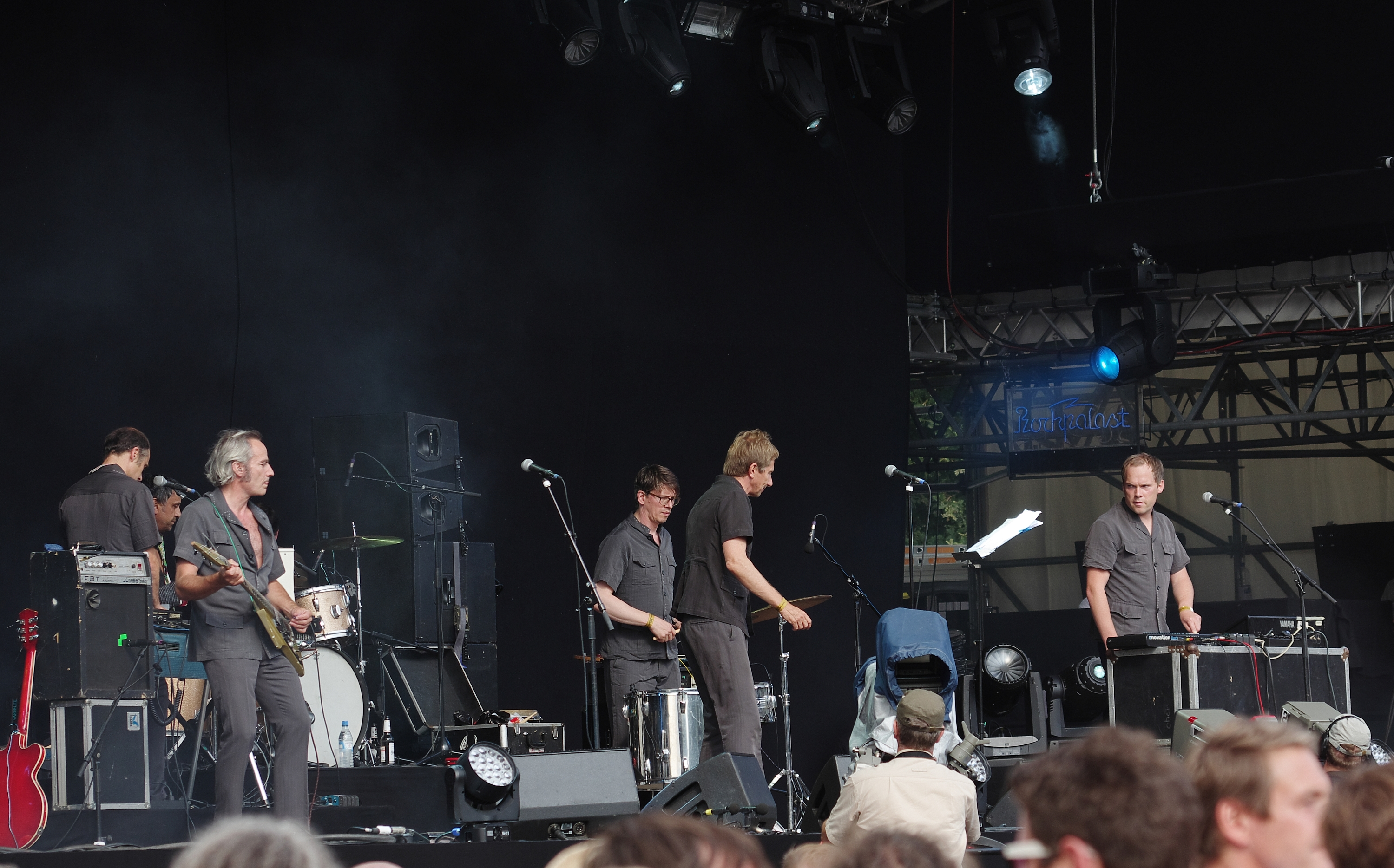
- Die Goldenen Zitronen live at Haldern Pop in 2013

Background information
- Origin: Hamburg, Germany
- Genres: Punk rock; jazz; new wave; avant-garde; hip hop; techno; electro
- Years active: 1984–present
- Members: Schorsch Kamerun; Ted Gaier; Thomas Wenzel (as Julius Block); Mense Reents; Enno Palucca; Stephan Rath
- Past members: Aldo Moro; Ale Sexfeind; Psycho 1 Rodrigo González; Hans Platzgumer
- Website: die-goldenen-zitronen.de

Die Goldenen Zitronen ("The Golden Lemons") are a German punk rock band from Hamburg, formed in 1984. They are considered a forerunner to the "Hamburger Schule" and are noted for their left-wing politics. Formed by Schorsch Kamerun (vocals), Ale Sexfeind (drums), Ted Gaier (bass, guitar), and Aldo Moro (guitar, bass), the band have released thirteen albums to date. Of the original line-up only Kamerun and Gaier remain, who both developed a number of side-projects.

== History ==
Initially they combined hard rock with 1970s-era punk and lyrics that were both angry, yet comedic and pop-like. The band rejected the traditional music industry, seeing themselves as a symbol of artistic independence not wanting to "serve the structures of rock" (Ted Gaier). Of the founding members, only Schorsch Kamerun and Ted Gaier remain. The new members are Thomas Wenzel (Die Sterne) under the pseudonym Julius Block, keyboarder and drummer Mense Reents (Die Vögel, Egoexpress, Stella), and Enno Paluca.

Bandmembers Julius Block (back) and Enno Palucca (in front)

In 1986, Die Goldenen Zitronen courted initial attention with their single Am Tag als Thomas Anders starb ("on the day Thomas Anders died"). Their subsequent single, Für immer Punk, was a cult hit in the German punk scene, inspiring comparisons with bands such as Abwärts, Die Toten Hosen and Die Ärzte.

In 1987 they released their debut album, Porsche, Genscher, Hallo HSV. Ox-Fanzine wrote in 2018 that while their seemingly "naive" fun-punk beginnings belied the band's later creativity, their artistic credo of subverting the conventions of the punk scene was already to be seen. Stephan Ramming likened the title track's cryptic phrase to the found objects of Dadaism.

The band developed their style further with 1990's Fuck You, in which they mock popular rock groups and protest against the tedium of daily life. 1994's Das bißchen Totschlag saw a major musical transition, in which the Zitronen mixed their usual power-rock style with elements of garage-trash, electro-beat, hip-hop and noise-pop. Songs like 80 Millionen (Hooligans) and Das bißchen Totschlag confronted the recent far-right violence against refugees and minorities, such as in Hoyerswerda and in Mölln, which had surged after German reunification.

Musical experimentation continued with 1996's Economy Class, which was influenced by improvisational jazz. With 1998's Dead School Hamburg (a jab at the Hamburger Schule trend of music), the band further altered their style, pursuing a greater emphasis on electronic instrumentation. Their 2001 album Schafott zum Fahrstuhl, took a more avant-garde direction. With the cover song Von den Schwierigkeiten, die Regierung stürzen zu wollen, the Zitronen parodied their own already-ironic song from a decade earlier.

Die Goldenen Zitronen have had a diverse number of collaborators, ranging from the poet Franz Josef Degenhardt to new acts such as Chicks on Speed or Peaches.

2006's Lenin was ranked sixth best release of the year by Spex magazine, and was the second-highest ranking German-language release. The title track was inspired by a visit to the Lenin Mausoleum and reflects on the tensions in Lenin as a historical figure, incorporating lyrics and audio samples from a song by Hanns Eisler (Er rührte an den Schlaf der Welt, based on a poem by Vladimir Mayakovsky) and the ironic use of Soviet-era slogans such as "Sleep quicker, comrades!" Other songs concern the entanglement between politics and the arts sector (Der Bürgermeister), globalisation and the militarisation of borders (Wenn ich ein Turnschuh wär), and the Hartz IV welfare reforms (Lied der Stimmungshochhalter). In 2016, Ted Gaier said that this album was a turning point for the band towards more collage-like lyrics featuring more voices.

2019's More Than a Feeling was "Album of the Week" in NDR Info Nachtclub in February 2019. Topics on the album include nationalism, authoritarian leadership, migration, and the left-wing scene from which the band originates. JMC Magazin named Das war unsere BRD and Die alte Kaufmannsstadt, Juli 2017 as two of the most relevant German-language songs of the year. The latter was described by Rolling Stone as a "clever and precise" portrayal of the protests against the 2017 G20 summit in Hamburg, at which the band played a concert in support of the demonstrations. Dierk Saathoff in Jungle World criticised the songs on nationalism as superficial and lacking the band's usual ability to confront a dialectic.

== Discography ==
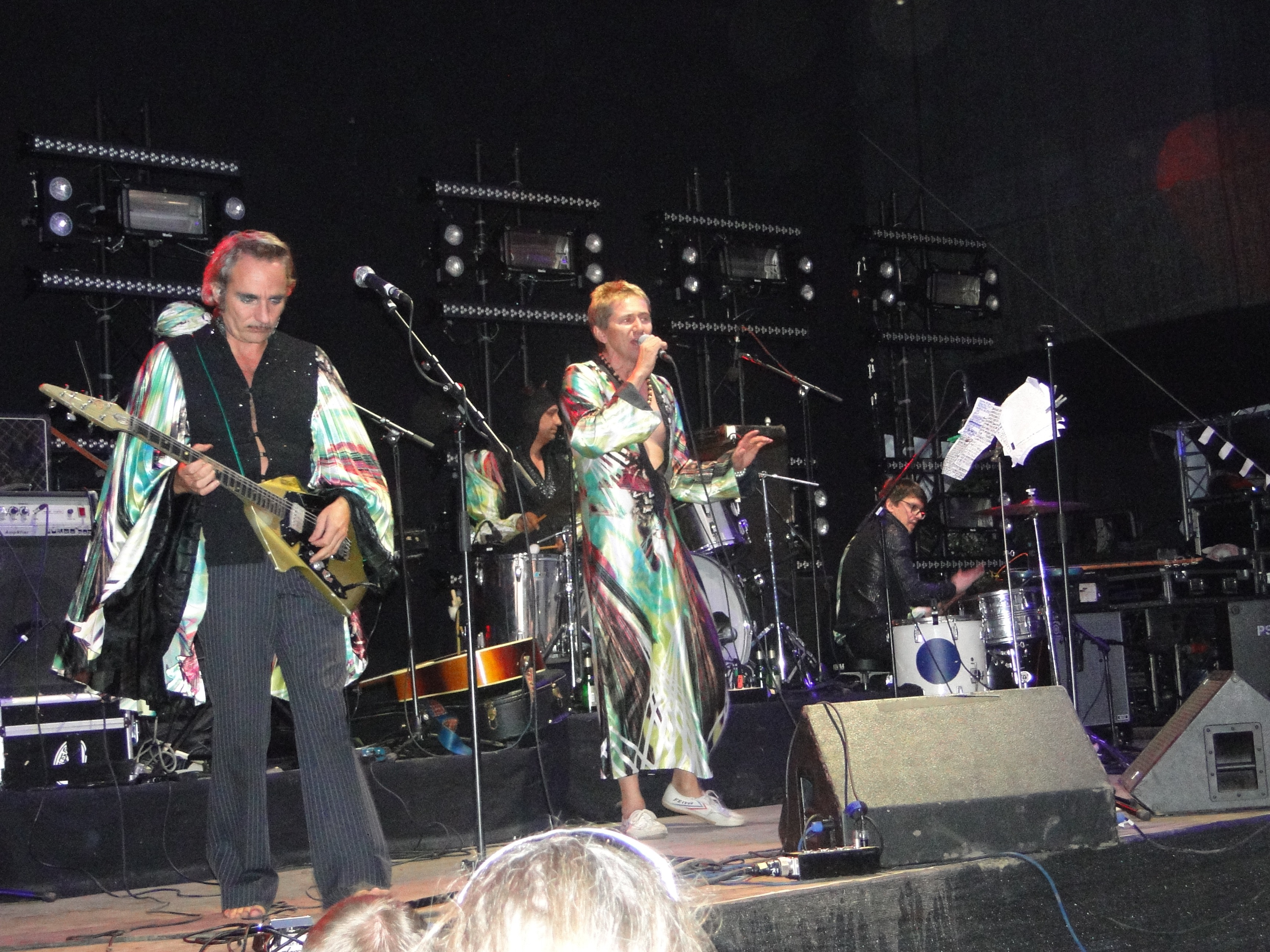
The band in 2011

=== Albums ===
- Porsche, Genscher, Hallo HSV (Weser Label, 1987)
- Kampfstern Mallorca dockt an (Weser Label, 1988)
- Fuck You (Vielklang, 1990)
- Punkrock (Vielklang, 1991)
- Das bißchen Totschlag (Sub-up Records, 1994)
- Economy Class (Sub-Up Records, 1996)
- Dead School Hamburg (Give me a Vollzeitarbeit) (Cooking Vinyl, 1998)
- Schafott zum Fahrstuhl (BuBack, 2001)
- Lenin (BuBack, 2006)
- Die Entstehung der Nacht (BuBack, 2009)
- Who's Bad (Buback 2013)
- Flogging a Dead Frog (Altin Village & Mine Records, 2015)
- More Than a Feeling (BuBack, 2019)

=== Compilations ===
- Hit Container (Weser Label, 1990) – cassette only

=== EP ===
- Das ist Rock – live in Japan (Weser Label, 1988)

=== Singles ===
- "Doris ist in der Gang" (Weser Label, 1987)

== Films ==
- German filmmaker Jörg Siepmann produced the film Golden Lemons, a documentary about 2002 United States-Tour of the band, which they made together with Wesley Willis and other bands. The film had its premiere at the Berlin International Film Festival in February 2003. Die Goldenen Zitronen dissociate themselves from the film.
- In 2007 Übriggebliebene ausgereifte Haltungen, another "rockumentary" about Die Goldenen Zitronen, by German filmmaker Peter Ott had its premiere in Hamburg and was released in German cinemas and on DVD in 2008.

== Other band member projects ==
- Ted Gaier: Three Normal Beatles and Les Robespieres (with Klaus Ramcke); Schwabinggrad Ballett (with Bernadette La Hengst, Knarf Rellöm)
- Mense Reents: Die Vögel (with Jakobus Durstewitz); N.R.F.B (Nuclear Raped Fuck Bomb) with (Jens Rachut, Lisa Hagmeister, Thomas Wenzel, Rebecca „Becci“ Oehms and Armin Nagel); Stella (with Elena Lange, Thies Mynther); Sophia Kennedy (producer)
- Julius Block: Die Sterne (with Frank Spilker and Christoph Leich); Cow (with Peta Devlin, Eckhard „Ecki“ Heins and Thomas Butteweg)
