= Rocko Schamoni =

German entertainer

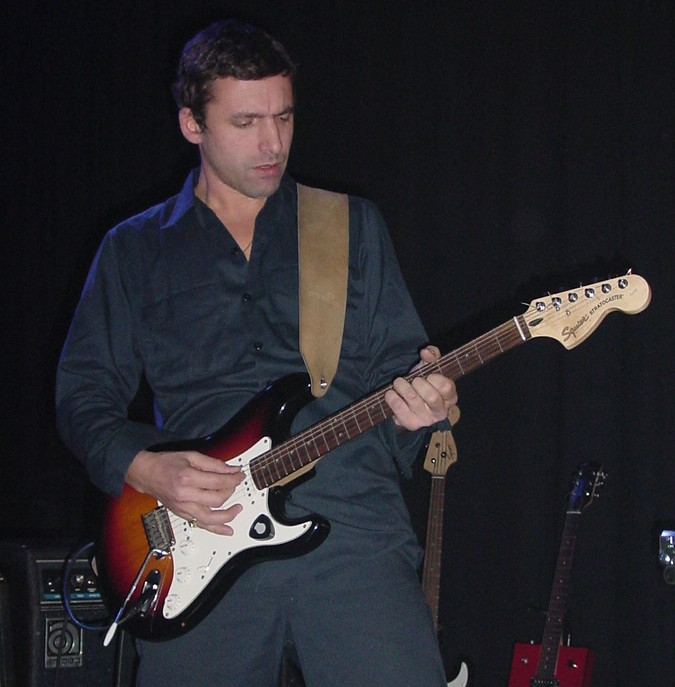
- Born: 8 May 1966 (age 59); Kiel, Germany
- Occupations: author, musician, entertainer and writer
- Website: Official website Rocko Schamoni at MySpace

Rocko Schamoni (born May 8, 1966), real name Tobias Albrecht, is a German entertainer, author, musician, club proprietor and member of the comedy ensemble Studio Braun.

== Biography ==
Rocko Schamoni was born in Kiel, Germany, and grew up in the small town of Lütjenburg. He released his first vinyl-single Liebe kann man sich nicht kaufen in 1987 followed by a lot of albums and singles. In 1998 he started the project Studio Braun with two other musicians from Hamburg.

In 2000 he also started authoring books. Rocko Schamoni released three autobiographical novels called Risiko des Ruhms (2000), Dorfpunks (2004) and Sternstunden der Bedeutungslosigkeit (2007). Dorfpunks became a German success, an autobiography narrating Schamoni's youth first as a fan of punk and then as a punk himself in his village Lütjenburg at the end of the 70s and at the beginning of the 80s. Schamoni was invited to several well-known TV shows as TV Total to promote his novel.

Together with Schorsch Kamerun and others Rocko Schamoni co-founded the Golden Pudel nightclub in Hamburg, well known as a hub of the Hamburger Schule movement.

Additionally he works as part-time actor also known as King Rocko Schamoni, Bims Brohm, IBM City Star, Mike Strecker, and Silvio Strecker.

== Discography ==
=== Studio albums ===
- 1988: Vision (LP, Weser Label)
- 1989: Jeans und Elektronik (LP/LP lim. mit Flexi-Disc/CD/MC, Polydor)
- 1990: Disco
- 1993: Ex-Leben (mit Motion)(CD, What’s so funny about)
- 1995: Galerie Tolerance
- 1996: Die frühen Werke des Monsieur 70 Volt
- 1999: Showtime (DoCD inkl. Remixe, Trikont)
- 2002: Der Schwere Duft von Anarchie (CD, Virgin)
- 2003: The Best of Rocko Schamoni (DoCD/LP, Trikont)
- 2007: Rocko Schamoni & Little Machine (CD, Trikont; LP, Nobistor)

=== Singles ===
- 1987: Liebe kann man sich nicht kaufen (7“-Weser Label)
- 1990: Ich will Liebe (7“-Vinyl, Weser Label; Maxi-CD/12“-Vinyl, Polydor)
- 1990: Was kostet Liebe (7“-Vinyl, Polydor)
- 1990: Mendocino (Duet with Michael Holm)
- 1991: Nackt in Las Vegas (7“-Vinyl/Maxi-CD, Polydor)
- 1999: Showtime Remixe (12“-Vinyl, Trikont)
- 2002: Geld ist eine Droge (Maxi-CD, Virgin)
- 2002: Heart of Plastic (12“-Vinyl/Maxi-CD, Virgin)
- 2005: Mauern (Maxi-CD, Trikont; 7“-Vinyl, Nobistor)
- 2006: Muster (Maxi-CD, Trikont; 7“-Vinyl, Nobistor)
- 2010: Mein Hass (7“-Vinyl, Duet with Cordelia Waal, Music and Production: Rockford Kabine)

== Bibliography ==
- 2000: Risiko des Ruhms
- 2004: Dorfpunks
- 2007: Risiko des Ruhms: Director's Cut
- 2007: Sternstunden der Bedeutungslosigkeit
- 2011: Tag der geschlossenen Tür
- 2014: Fünf Löcher im Himmel
- 2024: Pudels Kern

== Filmography ==
- 1988: Ballhaus Barmbek
- 1990: Rollo Aller!
- 1992: Rollo Aller! 2
- 1993: Die Ratte
- 2004: Jazzclub – Der frühe Vogel fängt den Wurm
- 2005: Wir waren niemals hier
- 2005: The Day Bobby Ewing Died
- 2007: 20.000 Jahre Studio Braun – Ein Jubiläum feiert Geburtstag (DVD)
- 2008: Krauts, Doubts & Rock 'n' Roll
- 2008: Rollo Aller! 4
- 2009: Dorfpunks
- 2012: Fraktus
