= Blumfeld =

German band

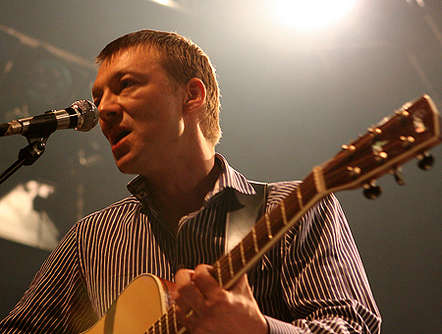
- Singer Jochen Distelmeyer performing with Blumfeld in 2007

Background information
- Origin: Hamburg, Germany
- Genres: Indie pop, noise rock (early)
- Years active: 1990–2007
- Labels: ZickZack, Big Cat
- Members: Jochen Distelmeyer; André Rattay; Lars Precht; Vredeber Albrecht
- Past members: Eike Bohlken; Peter Thiessen; Michael Mühlhaus
- Website: www.blumfeld.de

Blumfeld (German pronunciation: [ˈbluːmfɛlt]) was an indie pop band from Hamburg, Germany, formed by singer and songwriter Jochen Distelmeyer. The name of the band was taken from the main character of the short story "Blumfeld, ein älterer Junggeselle" by Franz Kafka. Blumfeld are counted among the most significant representatives of the Hamburger Schule (Hamburg School) and are considered to be one of the most successful combos of the German indie scene.

Blumfeld's lyrics are characterized by a distinctive disdain for human life in the context of modern consumer society. Fears, depressions, uncertainty, lack of orientation and love as main motive are the most important themes which are made a subject of discussion in their songs. The mainly melancholic music is seen as having a pessimistic tone.

== History ==
Blumfeld was founded in 1990 by members of the then-defunct bands Der Schwarze Kanal and Bienenjäger. Originally strongly influenced by guitar feedback, the band's style evolved more toward pop music during the mid-1990s. Among the band's distinct traits are the convoluted lyrics, critical of society, which are sometimes presented in sprechgesang by singer Jochen Distelmeyer. Because of these texts, Blumfeld was often regarded by their audience as a showcase band for left-wing intellectuals. Nevertheless, the band managed to convey broader messages to a larger audience later in their career.

Distelmeyer never considered writing his lyrics in another language than German. But the band always explicitly refused to be taken in by projects such as a quota of German language songs in airplay or the promotion of a "new German self-esteem" by German-language music.

== Legacy ==
On 22 January 2007, the band announced their split-up on their homepage. A farewell tour was held in April 2007 with the last concert taking place in Blumfeld's hometown Hamburg.

After their splitting up, Blumfeld received a number of critical acclaims. Christof Meueler of Junge Welt listed Blumfeld among the "great German protest bands" like Ton Steine Scherben and Fehlfarben. Die Welt praised Blumfeld as "one of the most influential German pop bands of the recent years" that quickly became successful with their "square-edged, vigorous music and the wilful and political lyrics", but "never let themselves be pigeonholed either". With songs like "Graue Wolken" [Grey Clouds], "Diktatur der Angepassten" [Dictatorship of the Conformists] or "Krankheit als Weg" [Illness as a Way] "Distelmeyer had, according to critics, created pieces of art that go far beyond quickly-consumed pop songs." Writing for Freitag, Ingar Solty called Blumfeld the "leftist-intellectuals of rock music in Germany" and attributed "an expressionistical-poetical language that will permanently stay out of touch in pop culture" to Distelmeyer. Jungle World wrote on Blumfeld's turn toward a broader audience that Blumfeld were in fact exceptional because no other band "would have been taken for serious any longer if they suddenly had started playing Schlager music."

In 2009, Jochen Distelmeyer started a solo career by publishing his debut album Heavy and two singles.

On the occasion of the 20th anniversary of Blumfeld's album L'Etat Et Moi the band announced they would play a jubilee tour in original line-up.

== Members ==
Final line-up

- Jochen Distelmeyer - vocals, guitar (1990–2007)
- André Rattay - drums, vibraphone (1990–2007)
- Lars Precht - bass guitar (2005–2007)
- Vredeber Albrecht - keyboard (2003–2007)

Former members

- Eike Bohlken - bass guitar (1990–1996)
- Peter Thiessen - bass guitar (1996–2002)
- Michael Mühlhaus - keyboard, vibraphone, synthesizer, bass guitar (1998–2005)

== Discography ==
(The English translations are for information only in this article. They were not used on releases.)

=== Albums ===
Year	Title	Peak positions		
Year	Title	GER	AUT	SWI
1992	Ich-Maschine [Ego-Machine]	—	—	—
1994	L'Etat Et Moi [The State and Me]	98	—	—
1999	Old Nobody	17	—	—
2001	Testament der Angst [Testament of Fear]	6	20	—
2003	Jenseits von Jedem [Beyond Anyone (also: Beyond Anything)]	7	18	80
2006	Verbotene Früchte [Forbidden Fruit]	21	43	—

=== Singles ===
Year	Title	Peak positions
Year	Title	GER
1991	"Ghettowelt" [Ghetto World]	—
1992	"Zeitlupe" [Slow Motion]	—
1992	"Traum:2" [Dream:2]	—
1994	"Draußen auf Kaution" [Out On Bail]	—
1995	"Verstärker" [Amplifier]	—
1999	"Tausend Tränen tief" [Thousand Tears Deep]	93
1999	"Status: Quo Vadis"	—
2001	"Graue Wolken" [Grey Clouds]	59
2001	"Die Diktatur der Angepassten" [The Dictatorship Of The Conformists]	—
2001	"Wellen der Liebe" [Waves Of Love]	—
2003	"Wir sind frei" [We Are Free]	59
2003	"Neuer Morgen" [New Morning]	—
2006	"Tics"	89
