= Die Sterne =

German indie pop band

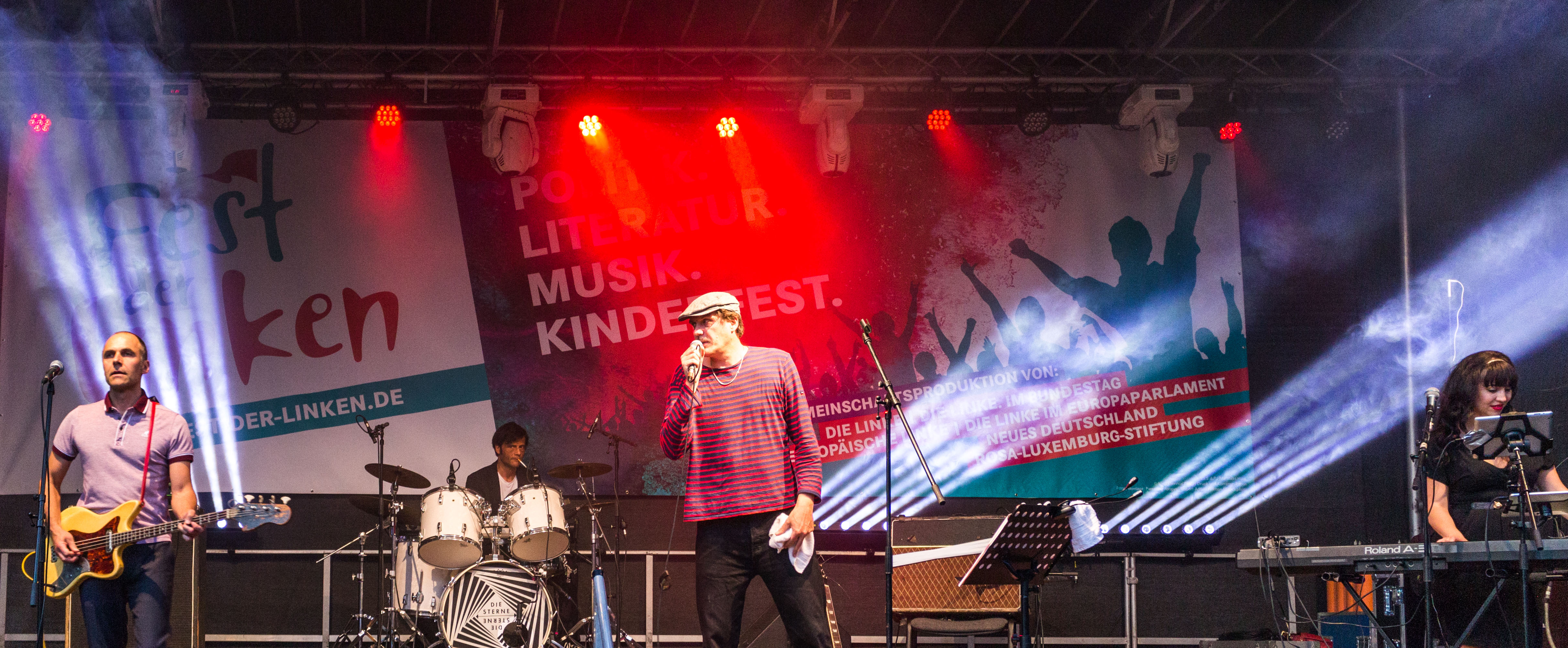
- Die Sterne in Berlin in 2015

Background information
- Origin: Hamburg, Germany
- Genres: Indie pop, Hamburger Schule
- Years active: 1987–present
- Labels: Fast Weltweit (1987-88); L'Age d'Or (1992-99); Virgin
- Members: Frank Spilker; Thomas Wenzel; Christoph Leich
- Past members: Frank Will (1992–2000); Richard von der Schulenburg (2000–2009); Mirko Breder (1987)
- Website: www.diesterne.de

Die Sterne is a two/three/four-piece indie pop band, from Hamburg, Germany. They were formed in 1991 and have released twelve studio albums, the most recent in 2022.

== Members ==
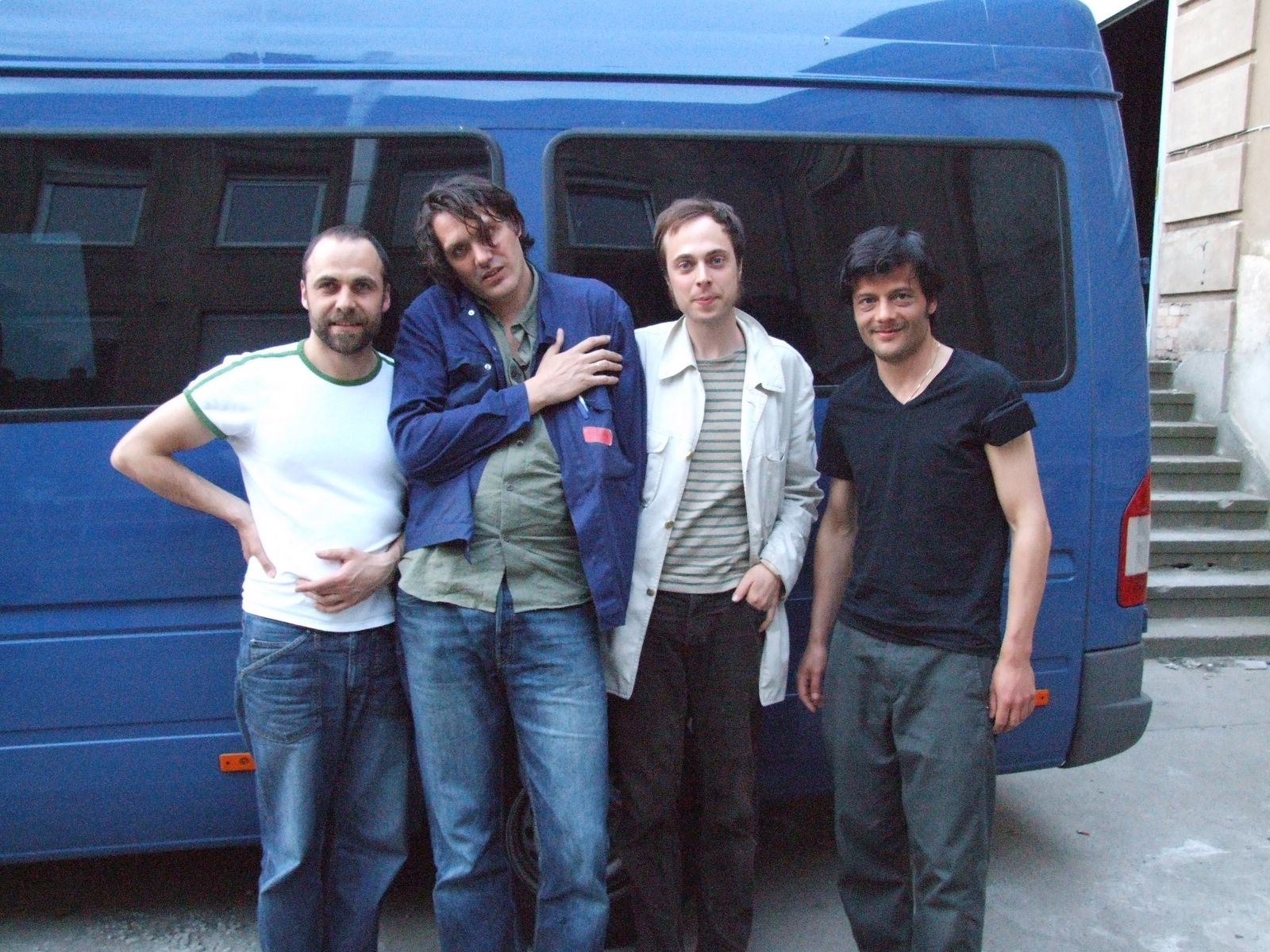
Die Sterne in Magdeburg in 2006 (Thomas Wenzel, Frank Spilker, Richard von der Schulenburg, Christoph Leich)

The band consists of Frank Spilker (vocals and guitar), Thomas Wenzel (bass and vocals), and Christoph Leich (drums). Frank Will and Richard von der Schulenburg were both former keyboarders for the band.
Thomas Wenzel is also a member of the bands Die Goldenen Zitronen and Cow, while keyboardist Richard von der Schulenburg and singer Frank Spilker pursue their own solo projects. In 2018 the two co-founders Christoph Leich und Thomas Wenzel left the band.

== Discography ==
=== Studio albums ===
- Wichtig (1993)
- In echt (1994)
- Posen (1996), peaked at position #64 on the German Music Charts
- von allen gedanken schätze ich doch am meisten die interessanten (1997), #43
- Wo ist hier (1999), #27
- Irres Licht (2002), #36
- Das Weltall ist zu weit (2004), #70
- Räuber und Gedärm (2006), #58
- 24/7 (2010), #61
- Für Anfänger (2012, mini-album)
- Flucht in die Flucht (2014), #43
- Die Sterne (2020)
- Hallo Euphoria (2022)
- Wenn es Liebe ist (2026)

=== Compilation albums ===
- Stell die Verbindung her (1998)
- Die Interessanten: Singles 1992-2004 (2005)

=== Singles ===
- Ein verregneter Sommer (1987)
- In Einer Nacht Wie Dieser (1988)
- Fickt das System (1992)
- Universal Tellerwäscher (1994)
- Was hat dich bloß so ruiniert (1996)
- Trrrmer (1996)
- Trrrmer-Remixe (1996)
- Unter Geiern II (1996)
- Widerschein (1996)
- Themenläden Remixe 1 (1997)
- Themenläden Remixe 2 (1997)
- Swinging Safari (1997)
- Die Interessanten (1997)
- Abstrakt (1997)
- Bis neun bist du O.K. (1997)
- Big in Berlin (1999)
- Das bißchen besser (1999)
- Nur Flug (2002)
- Wenn dir St. Pauli auf den Geist fällt (2002)
- Gerechtes Brett (2003)
- In diesem Sinn (2004)
