= Regine Olsen =

Søren Kierkegaard's fiancée

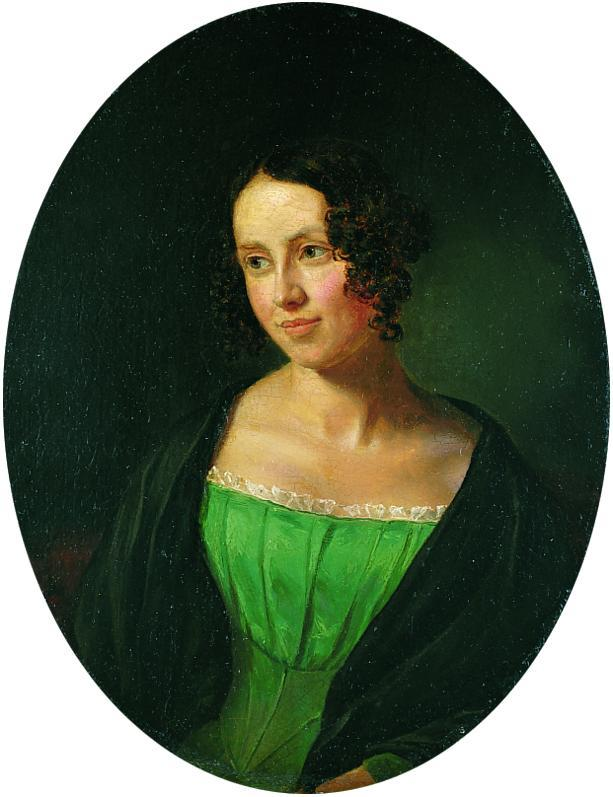
- Regine Olsen in 1840 (painted by Emil Bærentzen)
- Born: 23 January 1822; Copenhagen, Denmark
- Died: 18 March 1904 (aged 82); Copenhagen, Denmark
- Spouse: Johan Frederik Schlegel (m. 1847; died 1896)
- Partner: Søren Kierkegaard (1840–1841)
- Relatives: 6

Regine Schlegel (née Olsen; 23 January 1822 – 18 March 1904) was a Danish woman who was engaged to the philosopher and theologian Søren Kierkegaard from September 1840 to October 1841.

== Biography ==
=== Early years and engagement to Kierkegaard ===
Olsen was born on 23 January 1822 in Frederiksberg, a district of Copenhagen, Denmark. Her parents were Terkild Olsen, councilor of state and department head in the Finance Ministry, and Regine Frederikke Malling Olsen. Her family home was located in Børsgade, near Knippelsbro. Growing up, she would paint miniatures. She first met Kierkegaard on a spring day in 1837 while visiting the home of Mrs Catrine Rørdam when she was 15 and he 24. Olsen later recalled that upon this first meeting Kierkegaard had made "a very strong impression" upon her and a friend recalled Olsen being enraptured by the words and way in which Kierkegaard spoke. A mutual infatuation developed between the two while Olsen was being tutored by Johan Frederik Schlegel, her future husband.

They would then meet again at a gathering held by Lyngbye. By this point Olsen had made a strong impression on Kierkegaard, who would describe her in letters as pure, blissful and with a halo around her head. Kierkegaard began to pursue her over a long period of time, ingratiating himself first as a friend and later attempting to court her.

On 8 September 1840 Kierkegaard finally revealed his feelings to Olsen when she was playing the piano for him at her family's house. He recounted the events years later in his journal: "'Oh! What do I care for music, it's you I want, I have wanted you for two years.' She kept silent." Kierkegaard proceeded to plead his case to Etatsråd (Councilman) Olsen, Olsen's father, immediately. Her father granted Kierkegaard his blessing, and the two became engaged to be married. Until the eventual dissolution of their engagement, they lived quite happily, as Kierkegaard relied on Regine as a confidant. Each week, for instance, she would listen to Kierkegaard reading aloud to her a sermon from Bishop Jacob Mynster of Copenhagen.

Almost immediately, however, Kierkegaard began to have doubts about his ability to be a husband. Throughout the following year, Kierkegaard threw himself into his work. He began his seminary studies, preached his first sermon, and wrote his dissertation for his magister degree. Olsen sensed that Kierkegaard's ostensibly busy schedule was a pretence for avoiding her, an action which pained Kierkegaard deeply to do. They did maintain a voluminous correspondence; for a time he wrote her cryptic letters every Wednesday. Kierkegaard's letters have survived, but, aside from a few lines, Olsen's letters seem to have been destroyed.

Kierkegaard's letters were very reminiscent of Abelard's letter to Philintus where Abelard wrote:

Fulbert surprised me with Heloise, but what man that had a soul in him would not have borne any ignominy on the same conditions? The next day I provided myself with a private lodging near the loved house, being resolved not to abandon my prey. I abode some time without appearing publicly. Ah! how long did those few days seem to me! When we fall from a state of happiness with what impatience do we bear our misfortunes! It being impossible that I could live without seeing Heloise, I endeavoured to engage her servant, whose name was Agaton, in my interest. She was brown, well-shaped, and a person superior to her rank; her features were regular and her eyes sparkling, fit to raise love in any man whose heart was not prepossessed by another passion. I met her alone and entreated her to have pity on a distressed lover.

— The Love Letters of Abelard and Heloise

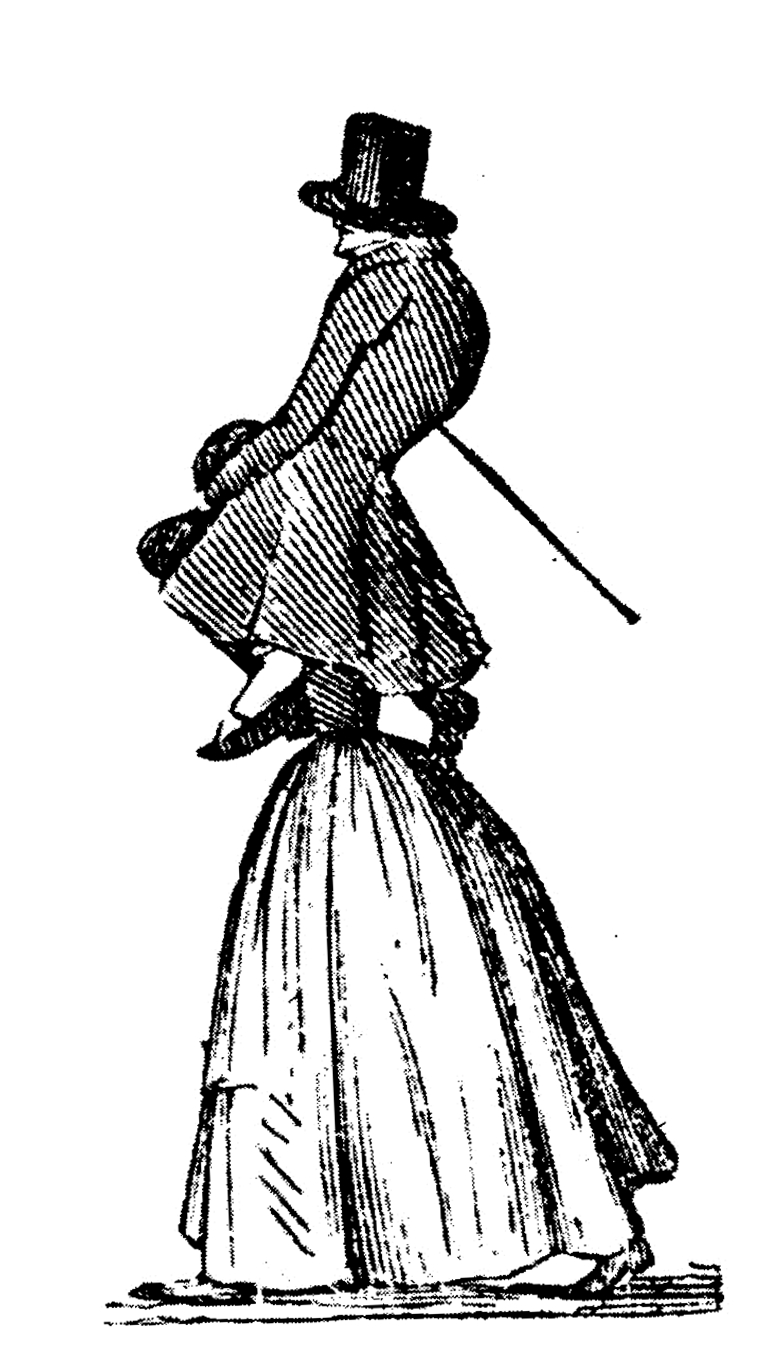
Regine Olsen as depicted by The Corsair

=== End of engagement ===
On 11 August 1841 Kierkegaard broke off the engagement believing it would be torturous for Olsen to be his companion because there was "something spectral about me, something no one can endure who has to see me every day and have a real relationship with me". Kierkegaard also believed that God was calling him to celibacy and that his life was soon to be over as his health was always poor (Note: Which Kierkegaard believed was due to a curse laid upon his family after his father cursed god.), being rejected by the military for being unfit previously. He sent Olsen a farewell letter along with his engagement ring. Olsen, heartbroken, immediately went to Kierkegaard's house; he was not there, but she left a note pleading for him not to leave her. Olsen did not want the engagement to end, fearing it would strengthen Kierkegaard's growing melancholy and depression although to envision Kierkegaard as a husband was foreign to her thoughts. In her conversations with Hanne Mourier in her later life, she stated that:

Kierkegaard's motivation for the break was his conception of his religious task; he dared not bind himself to anyone on earth in order not to be obstructed from his calling. He had to sacrifice the very best thing he owned in order to work as God demanded of him: therefore he sacrificed love … for the sake of his writing.

Kierkegaard seems to have genuinely loved Olsen but was unable to reconcile the prospect of marriage with his vocation as a writer, his passionate, introspective Christianity and his constant melancholy. Olsen was shattered by his rejection of her, and was unwilling to accept Kierkegaard's breaking of their engagement, threatening to kill herself if he did not take her back. Kierkegaard attempted to quell her interest, he later wrote, "there was nothing else for me to do but to venture to the uttermost, to support her, if possible, by means of deception, to do everything to repel her from me to rekindle her pride." He wrote her cold, calculated letters to make it seem that he no longer loved her, but Olsen clung to the hope that they would get back together, desperately pleading to him to take her back. On 11 October 1841 Kierkegaard met with her and again broke off the engagement in person. Her father tried to persuade him to reconsider after assessing Olsen's desperate condition, claiming that "It will be the death of her; she is in total despair". Kierkegaard returned the next day and spoke with Olsen. To her query as to whether he would ever marry, Kierkegaard icily responded: "Well, yes, in ten years, when I have begun to simmer down and I need a lusty young miss to rejuvenate me." In reality, Kierkegaard had no such plans, and would remain a celibate bachelor for the rest of his life.

Olsen was crushed by the whole affair, soon falling ill as a result. Olsen was equally "in despair, utterly desperate" and angered, with Kierkegaard recalling how she "took out a small note on which there was something written by me which she used to carry in her breast; she took it out and quietly tore it into small pieces and said: ‘So after all, you have played a terrible game with me". Kierkegaard was equally distraught, being described as spending his nights crying in his bed without her. For their engagement, he had given her a gold ring set with diamonds which after its return he had resized and arranged the stones in the form of a cross. He wore this ring for the rest of his life. The story of the engagement became a source of gossip in Copenhagen, with Kierkegaard's flippant dismissal and apparently cruel seduction of Olsen becoming wildly exaggerated. Olsen's family reacted with a mixture of confusion, finding Kierkegaard's actions incomprehensible, to outright hatred for causing Olsen such pain, although Olsen's sister Cornelia, despite not understanding Kierkegaard's actions, nevertheless believed him to be a good person. Kierkegaard would later beg for Olsen to forgive him for his actions. In a famous letter, he wrote, "Above all, forget the one who writes this; forgive someone who, whatever else, could not make a girl happy."

Kierkegaard was so concerned that Olsen might actually destroy herself because she said she could not live without him that he tried to give her advice in his Fourth Upbuilding Discourse of 1844. He wanted her to be able to stand on her own with or without him. He asked her:

"When the first self submits to the deeper self, they are reconciled and walk on together. ... Would you be better off now by having lost some of that burning desire and having won the understanding that life cannot deceive you; is not that kind of losing a winning? That little secret we two have between us, as the deeper self said. What, presumably, is this secret, my listener? What else but this, that with regard to the external a person is capable of nothing at all. If he wants to seize the external immediately, it can be changed in the same instant, and he can be deceived; on the other hand, he can take it with the consciousness that it could also be changed, and he is not deceived even though it is changed, because he has the deeper self's consent. If he wants to act immediately in the external, to accomplish something, everything can become nothing in that same moment; on the other hand, he can act with this consciousness, and even if it came to nothing, he is not deceived, because he has the deeper self's consent. But even if the first self and the deeper self have been reconciled in this way and the shared mind has been diverted away from the external, this is still only the condition of coming to know himself. But if he is actually to know himself, there are new struggles and new dangers."

— Søren Kierkegaard, Eighteen Upbuilding Discourses (1844), Hong translation pp. 316–317 (Four Upbuilding Discourses)

Kierkegaard mentioned the concern that awoke his conscience in this Upbuilding Discourses and came to the conclusion that the power of forgiveness is a good and perfect gift from God. (See: Four Upbuilding Discourses, 1843, and: Love Will Hide a Multitude of Sins (See: Three Upbuilding Discourses, 1843.)

He wanted one thing from Regine that she would not give, forgiveness. If one cannot forgive another, how does one forgive himself or herself or expect forgiveness from God? He wrote the following in 1845:

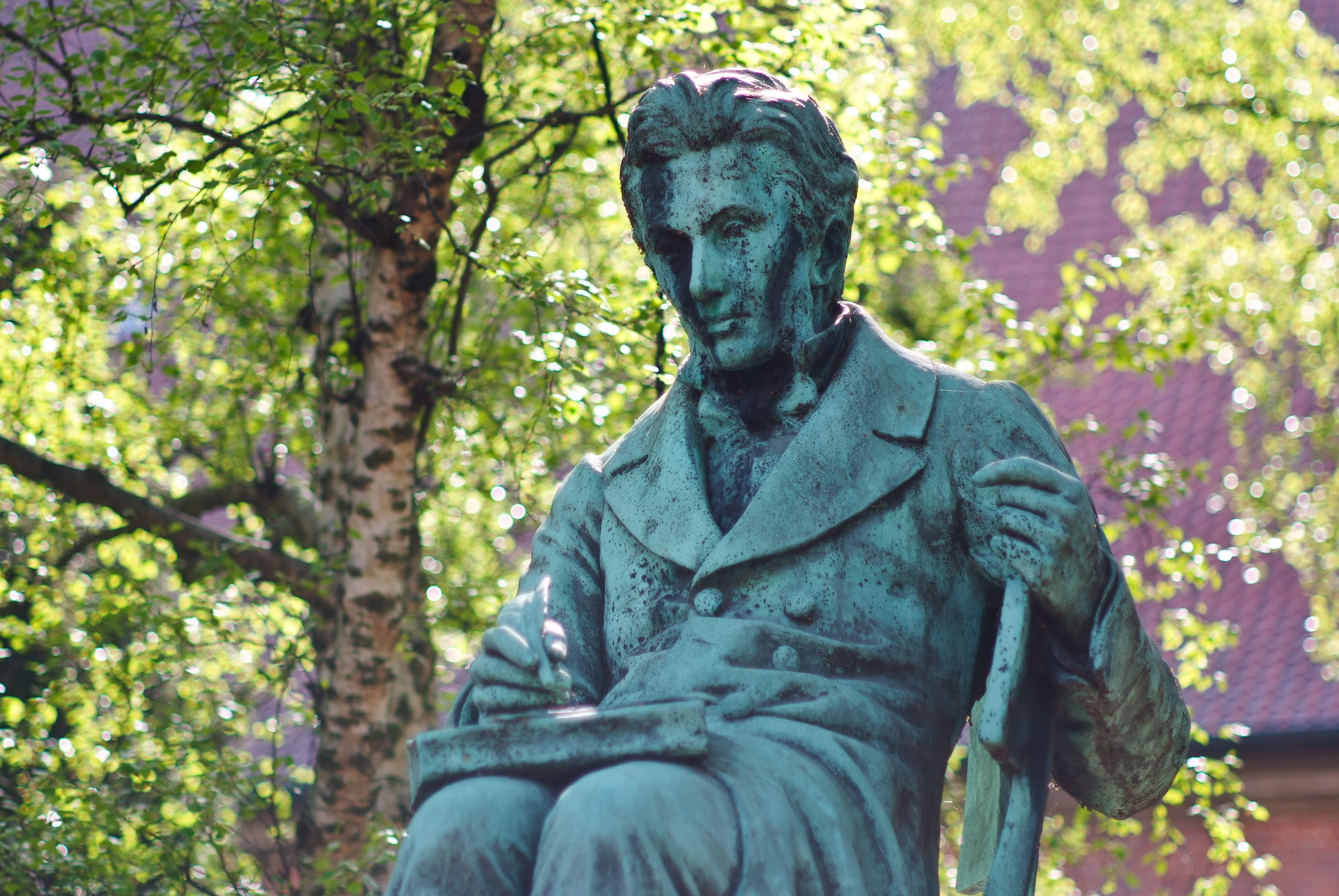
Statue of Søren Kierkegaard by Louis Hasselriis

"That it [the broken engagement] can be forgiven, if not here then nevertheless in an eternity. Is there anything dubious about this forgiveness? Yes, there is – that I do not have her forgiveness; and she is and remains an intermediate court, a legitimate court, that must not be bypassed. Her forgiveness certainly cannot justify me eternally, no more than a person's implacability can harm anyone but himself, but her forgiveness is a part of a divine procedure. Why, then, do you not have it? Because I could not make myself understandable to her. ... Suppose she had forgiven me. Then, of course, she would not have forgotten me. But can we see each other then? Suppose she stood beside someone else. When she stands that way within time, I am standing in her path and therefore shall go away. But if I stood in her path in eternity, where should I go. Compared with eternity, is time the stronger? Has time the power to separate us eternally?"

— Søren Kierkegaard, Stages on Life's Way (1845), Hong pp. 380–382, 390–391

"What would indeed be as disconsolate, yes, almost to the point of despair, as this—if, at the moment when the misunderstanding one returned and sought understanding, when the unfriendly one returned and sought friendship, when the one who had hated returned and sought reconciliation-what would be as disconsolate as this: if the one who loves has then wasted away, so that neither understanding nor the restoration of friendship nor the renewal of reconciliation in love could really take place with the blessed joy of eternity! On the other hand, what can make the moment of forgiveness, the transition of agreement so natural, so easy as this: that the one who loves by abiding, has continually cleared away the past."

— Søren Kierkegaard, Works of Love (1847), Hong 1995 pp. 313–314

"You must have God's help to believe that you are saved by Baptism; you must have God's help to believe that in the Lord's Supper you receive the gracious forgiveness of your sins. Be it done for you as you believe. But everything in you that is flesh and blood and is timorousness and attachment to things of this earth must despair, so that you cannot acquire external certainty. If this like for like holds true even in relation to what most definitely must be called Gospel, how much more, then, when Christianity is itself the Law. "Forgive, then you will be forgiven" '

— Søren Kierkegaard, Works of Love (29 September 1847), Hong pp. 378–380

Sometime after the dissolution of the engagement and Olsen's marriage, Kierkegaard considered writing to her in order to explain his behaviour but decided not to, believing it would damage his relationship with God, which he saw as his first and foremost calling in life. In 1849 Kierkegaard sent a letter to Olsen expressing his sorrow and pleading for forgiveness.

That I was cruel is true; that I, committed to a higher relationship, not simply for the sake of my virtue, had to be so because of love is a certainty; that you have suffered indescribably I realize; but I was to suffer more, I believe and know.—Nevertheless, I am ready to ask your forgiveness—provided you understand it as follows, provided you harbor no other explanation of our relationship than the fabrication, provided and forced upon you by my solicitude, that I was a black-hearted villain who broke a sacred obligation out of self-love, cruelly deceiving a lovely young girl who with all the righteousness of innocence on her side, with almost worshipful admiration and almost childlike devotion, entrusted herself to him. Provided you understand the matter in that way, then let me remain in the character of that pious deception: I am a villain, but now I come as a suffering penitent and beg forgiveness

— (Letter 235, p. 322f.)

Olsen outlived Kierkegaard by almost half a century; she died in March 1904 at the age of eighty-two. Johannes Hohlenberg preserved a letter she wrote to Henrik Lund, Kierkegaard's nephew, in which she said, "His death filled me not only with sorrow but with concern, as though by postponing action I had committed a great injustice against him. …. But since his death, it has seemed to me as if it were a duty I had neglected from cowardice; a duty not only towards him, but towards God, to whom he sacrificed me, whether he did it from an innate tendency to self-torment (a misgiving he himself had), or whether, as I think time and the results of his work will show, from a higher call from God."

=== Effect of breakup on Kierkegaard ===
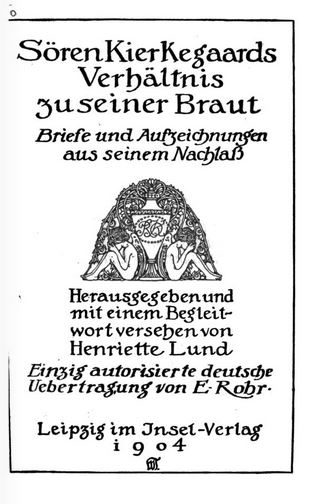
Sören Kierkegaard's relation to his fiancee

Kierkegaard never fully recovered from his failed relationship with Olsen, remaining forever smitten with her, writing in a letter addressed to Olsen he said:

Everywhere, in the face of every girl, I see the features of your beauty, but I think I would have to possess the beauty of all the girls in the world to extract your beauty, that I would have to sail around the world to find the portion of the world I want and toward which the deepest secret of my self polarically points-and in the next moment you are so close to me, so present, so overwhelmingly filling my spirit that I am transfigured to myself and feel that here it is good to be.

For a time in between their break-up and her marriage to Schlegel, they had polite and civil contact during daily walks and in church. These were mostly non-verbal on Kierkegaard's part and caused him great anxiety, although he still was able to find joy in the interactions, writing in his journal, “As often happens to me of late, I can’t help but smile when I see her". For example on his 39th birthday, Olsen appeared to him at his house in Østerbro, Kierkegaard returned the greeting and they both went their separate ways. It seems that he was attempting to utilize his complicated authorial method of indirect communication in his personal life, and his tormented approach caused him great distress. When he absconded to Berlin in 1842 to study philosophy, he was haunted by a woman who bore an uncanny resemblance to Olsen. Even while immersing himself in his studies, she was always on his mind: "Not even here in Berlin has my, alas, all-too-inventive brain been able to refrain from scheming something or other. She must either love me or hate me, she knows no third possibility. Nor is there anything more harmful to a young girl than half-way situations." It was during this time that Kierkegaard was formulating his own philosophy, as well as his first book, Either/Or. It seems by the time of his death he still held his feelings of love to Olsen as she was the only person listed in his will, whom Kierkegaard, for all intents and purposes, considered himself married to. Olsen ultimately rejected the will.

It is naturally my will that my former fiancée, Mrs Regine Schlegel, should inherit unconditionally what little I leave behind. If she herself refuses to accept it, it is to be offered to her on the condition that she act as a trustee for its distribution to the poor. What I wish to express is that for me an engagement was and is just as binding as a marriage, and that therefore my estate is to revert to her in exactly the same manner as if I had been married to her.

Kierkegaard would frequently confide in his friend Emil Boesen about matters relating to Olsen. In one instance Bosen suggested that Kierkegaard stop learning what he can of Olsen, to which Kierkegaard enraged replied:

So you would leave me to my Daydreams! In this you are mistaken. I am not dreaming, I am awake. I do not turn her into poetry. I do not call her to my mind, but I call myself to account. This is as far as I can go: I think I am able to turn anything into poetry, but when it comes to duty, obligation, responsibility, etc., I cannot and will not turn those into poetic subjects. If she had broken our engagement, my soul would soon have driven the plough of forgetfulness over her, and she would have served me as others have done before her—but now, now I serve her. If it were in her power to surround me with vigilant scouts who were always putting me in mind of her, she could still not be so clearly remembered as she is now in all her righteousness, all her beauty, all her pain. So just keep me informed. In the course of these recent events my soul has received a needed baptism, but that baptism was certainly not by sprinkling, for I have descended into the waters, all has gone black before my eyes, but I rise to the surface again. Nothing, after all, so develops a human being as adhering to a plan in defiance of the whole world. Even if it were something evil, it would still serve to a high degree to develop a person...

— (Letter 50, p. 93).

=== Later years and marriage to Johan Frederik Schlegel ===
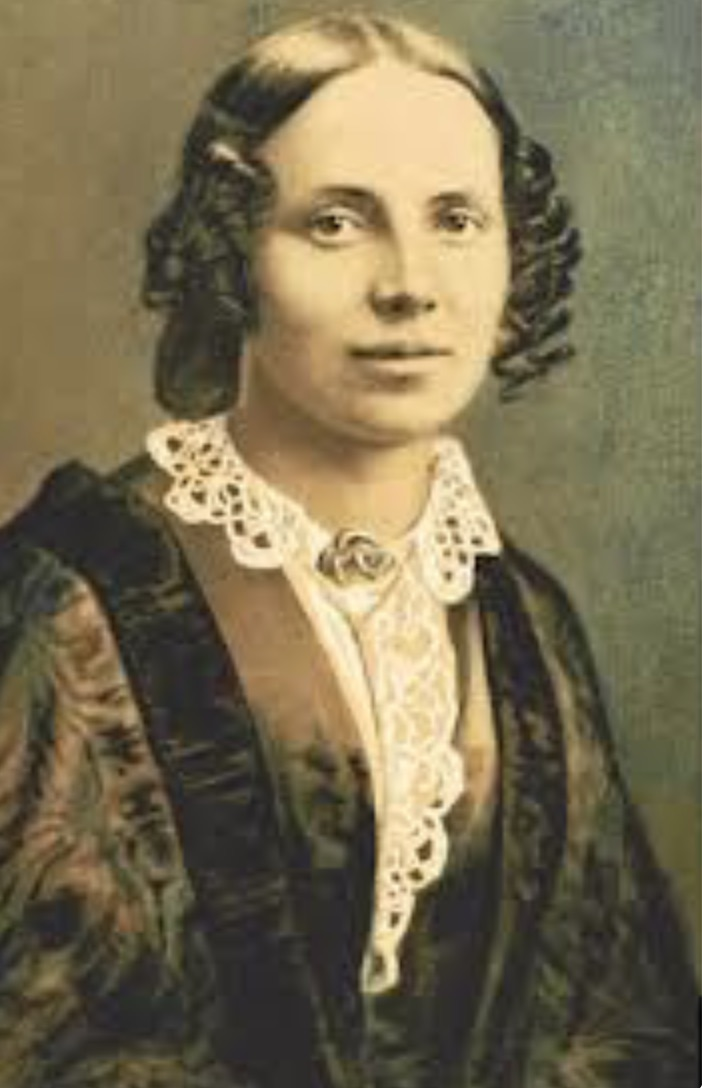
Regine Olsen, circa 1870s

On 16 April 1843 Kierkegaard was leaving Vor Frue Church when he saw Olsen who nodded to him which Kierkegaard understood to mean she had forgiven him. This was an important interaction for them which would signify that Olsen had moved on. Kierkegaard would later write in his journal:

At Vespers on Easter Sunday in Frue Kirke (during Mynster's sermon), she nodded to me. I do not know if it was pleadingly or forgivingly, but in any case very affectionately. I had sat down in a place apart, but she discovered it. Would to God that she had not done so. Now a year and a half of suffering and all the enormous pains I took are wasted; she does not believe that I was a deceiver, she has faith in me. What ordeals now lie ahead of her. The next will be that I am a hypocrite. The higher we go, the more dreadful it is. That a man of my inwardness, of my religiousness, could act in such a way. And yet I can no longer live solely for her, cannot expose myself to the contempt of men in order to lose my honor—that I have done. Shall I in sheer madness go ahead and become a villain just to get her to believe it—ah, what help is that. She will still believe that I was not that before.

— (Journals, IV A 97).

On 3 November 1847 Olsen married her former tutor, Johan Frederik Schlegel, in the Church of Our Saviour in Copenhagen. The marriage was happy and stable. The two even read aloud to each other passages from Kierkegaard's writings, which were then getting much attention in Denmark.

On a number of occasions in 1849, Olsen and Kierkegaard crossed each other's paths, beginning with dispersing from church after Mass, and later on the routes for afternoon walks both of them took. On 19 November 1849 Frederik Schlegel received a letter from Kierkegaard entreating him to allow him to speak to Olsen. Schlegel did not respond to the letter and denied Kierkegaard further requests to talk with Olsen. On the 10th of September 1852, the twelfth anniversary of their engagement, they met once again but neither engaged in conversation, just admiration, which Kierkegaard found agonizing. On Christmas day of that year, they met once again; however Kierkegaard noted that it seemed as if she was waiting for him or someone at least. Kierkegaard found the exchange to be odd and deeply personal and even afterwards he felt as if she was "searching me with her eyes". Soon afterwards, Frederik was appointed governor of the Danish West Indies, and Olsen accompanied him there, departing on 17 March 1855. Before leaving she visited Kierkegaard one last time exclaiming to him, “God bless you — may good things come your way!” She was never to see Kierkegaard again.

Olsen found the journey to be troublesome citing the "complete spiritual apathy" as the worst element in her letter to her sister and confidante Cornelia. She also found it hard parting from her mother Regine Frederikke, now a widow of six years after the death of her husband Terkild; Maria her eldest sister whose house Olsen and friends would frequent in summer; and most importantly her sister Cornelia who Olsen was closest to in age and nature. Cornelia was strongly admired by not only Olsen, but Kierkegaard as well, who described her as the "most excellent female character I have known and the only who has compelled my admiration" and a character of a similar name appeared in The Seducer's Diary.

Kierkegaard would go on to die in Frederiks Hospital, eight months after Olsen's departure. In his final years Kierkegaard discussed Olsen to his friend Emil Boesen. In one passage Kierkegaard said that:

I have my thorn in the flesh, as did St. Paul, so I was unable to enter into ordinary relationships. I therefore concluded that it was my task to be extraordinary, which I then sought to carry out as best I could. I was a plaything of Governance, which cast me into play, and I was to be used. . . . And that was also what was wrong with my relationship to Regine. I had thought that it could be changed, but it couldn’t, so I dissolved the relationship.

Olsen experienced feelings of guilt and regret, revealing in her letters to Henrik Lund that she regretted being unable to resolve the tension between her and Kierkegaard as she intended to in later life and that she felt as if she had wronged him.

Olsen and Schlegel returned from Saint Croix in 1860 and spent the rest of their lives in Copenhagen. During their time there they – Olsen, in particular – familiarised themselves with diaries of Kierkegaard. The release was controversial at the time due to subjects of passages still alive such as Olsen. Upon reading sections dedicated to her, Schlegel recalled she would become physically ill.

Frederick would soon become ill and die on 8 June 1896, a time in which Olsen was equally ill dealing with depression and influenza. In 1897, Olsen moved to Frederiksberg to live with her older brother. Schlegel's death left her a widow not only to him, but in her eyes Kierkegaard as well.

After the death of Schlegel, she accepted requests by biographers, commentators and friends, to discuss her side of the relationship between her and Kierkegaard. The interviewers included Hanne Mourier, Raphael Meyer, Peter Munthe Brun, Robert Neiiendam, Julius Clausen, and Georg Brandes. In 1898 she decided to dictate to, among others, the librarian Raphael Meyer the story of her engagement to Kierkegaard. This account was published after Olsen's death in 1904 as Kierkegaardian Papers: The Engagement; Published on Behalf of Mrs. Regine Schlegel, but in general scholars concede that it offers little information that was not already known through Kierkegaard and other sources. Olsen is buried in Assistens Cemetery in Copenhagen, along with both Kierkegaard and Frederik Schlegel. In his commentary about her, Robert Neiiendam wrote that "she knew 'that he took her with him into history.' And this thought made up for what she had suffered."

In her final years, childhood friend Raphael Meyer said that:

She had a simple youthful longing to see her Fritz again, and yet she repeated with sincere conviction Kierkegaard’s words to her: 'You see, Regine, in eternity there is no marriage; there, both Schlegel and I will happily be together with you.'

== Olsen in Kierkegaard's writings ==
Regine Olsen occupies a central role in Kierkegaard's thought and writings, and indeed a unique position in the history of all of Western philosophy. In some ways, it is difficult to understand Kierkegaard fully without at least a cursory knowledge of his failed relationship to Regine.

Kierkegaard's failed relationship with Olsen influenced his views on marriage, love, commitment, authenticity, and perhaps above all, faith and relationship to God. His mention of her in his writings, however, (aside from his personal journals) is always indirect. Either/Or, Kierkegaard's first book, is full of veiled references to his relationship with Olsen. Aside from lengthy sections dealing with the matters of erotic seduction and a sermon on the virtues of marriage, it includes The Seducer's Diary, featuring a young man who calculates his seduction of a young girl from afar, and upon winning her affection, breaking off the relationship. The story has strong parallels to Kierkegaard's relationship to Olsen and has often been taken to be a fictionalization of it, intending to portray Kierkegaard, as cold and callous and Olsen, innocent and victimized. Kierkegaard made this clear in his journals writing that:

I must have her husband interposed between us. Either/Or! If am to become involved with her it must be on the grandest scale, and I would want it to be known to everyone, with her transformed into a triumphant figure who would be granted the fullest restitution for all the disparagement that was her lot because I had broken my engagement to her.

Stages on Life's Way contains an analysis of the three "spheres of existence" — the aesthetic, the ethical, and the religious. As the ethical corresponds to dedicating one's life to another – to marriage – the religious corresponds to dedicating one's self to God. It seems to have been this decision – this "either/or" – which consumed Kierkegaard during the years of his engagement, and he felt that he could not reconcile his marriage with his religious calling.

Fear and Trembling has frequently been seen as analogous for Kierkegaard and Olsen's relationship mirroring the tale of Abraham sacrificing Isaac. Biographer and writer of 'Philosopher of the Heart: The Restless Life of Søren Kierkegaard' Clare Carlisle said that Kierkegaard "feels he has sacrificed a life with Regine, and with it his own honour and his family’s good name, for the sake of something that is difficult to explain".

With the exception of a single work dedicated to Poul Martin Møller, Kierkegaard dedicated all of his writings to his father, another formative figure in his life, and to Olsen.

== Historical legacy ==
In 1995 Kierkegaard biographer Joakim Garff gained access to letters written by Regine to her sister Cornelia during the period of the Schlegels' time in the West Indies. Though somewhat guarded, her letters reveal Regine's discomfort with the tropical climate and distaste for what she viewed as the superficiality and pettiness of colonial life. She does not refer to Kierkegaard directly in these letters, despite receiving and reading his posthumous papers from Kierkegaard's nephew Henrik Lund during this period.

The first full-length biography of Olsen is Joakim Garff's Regines gåde: Historien om Kierkegaards forlovede og Schlegels hustru ("Regine's Riddle: The Story of Kierkegaard's Fiancee and Schlegel's Wife") (Copenhagen: Gads, 2013), subsequently translated as Kierkegaard's Muse: The Mystery of Regine Olsen (trans. Alastair Hannay, Princeton University Press, 2017).

== In popular culture ==
- British author David Lodge delves extensively into the love story between Kierkegaard and Olsen in his 1995 novel Therapy, as the protagonist Tubby Passmore goes through a mid-life crisis and becomes obsessed with Kierkegaard's writings and especially the story of his love for Olsen, visiting Copenhagen and Kierkegaard's study.
- Italian post-rock band port-royal has a song titled "Regine Olsen."
- US indie pop band, The Receptionists, have a song titled "Søren Loved Regina".
- There is a Russian synthpop duo called Regine Ollsenn [sic].
