= Virgo Blaktro and the Movie Disco =

Studio album by Felix da Housecat
- Released: October 2, 2007
- Recorded: 2006–2007
- Genre: House, electroclash, funk, soul
- Label: Nettwerk Records
- Producer: Felix da Housecat

Felix da Housecat chronology
| Playboy: The Mansion Soundtrack (2005) | Virgo Blaktro and the Movie Disco (2007) | He Was King (2009) |

Professional ratings
Review scores
| Source | Rating |
|---|---|
| Allmusic | 4/5 stars |
| bbc.co.uk | (positive) |
| Okayplayer | 3.5/5 stars |
| Pitchfork Media | (5.4/10) |
| Rockfeedback | 4/5 stars |

Virgo Blaktro and the Movie Disco is an album by Felix da Housecat, his first studio album since Devin Dazzle & the Neon Fever in 2004. It was released on October 2, 2007 on Nettwerk Records. The album spans several musical genres including electronic, house music, funk, soul and pop. It was recorded in Barcelona and Antwerp and like Devin Dazzle it is a concept album; this one is centered on the revival of 1970s and 1980s black music.

Felix da Housecat explained his inspiration for the album:

This is the first record I've done with black folks, but to me it's not a colour thing, it's more like a roots thing. This record has a black, soulful groove, it's more like Sly & the Family Stone. With this album I wanted to go Parliament, I wanted to go Prince, and at the same time I wanted to go like George Michael and Pet Shop Boys, only them being black. This stuff is all black-influenced.

"Future Calls the Dawn" and "Sweet Frosti" were released together as a single prior to the album's release. The music video for "Like Something 4 Porno!" is available to view on Felix da Housecat's official MySpace page.

Virgo Blaktro and the Movie Disco leaked to the internet in its entirety in late August 2007.

== Track listing ==
all songs written by Felix da Housecat (Felix Stallings) except where noted.

1. "Virgo Appears" — 01:02
2. "MovieDisco" — 03:23
3. "Like Something 4 Porno!" — 03:23
4. "Radio" — 02:54
5. "Sweetfrosti" (Casale/Mothersbaugh/Stallings) — 02:45
6. "Blaktro Man" — 00:38
7. "Mad Sista" — 00:34
8. "It's Been a Long Time" — 02:24
9. "Monkey Cage" — 02:07
10. "I Seem 2B the 1" — 01:53
11. "It's Your Move" — 02:21
12. "Lookin' My Best" — 02:04
13. "Pretty Girls Don't Dance" — 00:29
14. "Tweak" — 05:29
15. "NightTripperz" — 03:16
16. "The Future Calls the Dawn" — 06:33
