= He Was King =

Studio album by Felix da Housecat
- Released: August 25, 2009
- Recorded: 2008–2009
- Genre: Electronica, synthpop
- Label: Nettwerk
- Producer: Felix da Housecat

Felix da Housecat chronology
Virgo Blaktro and the Movie Disco (2007)	He Was King (2009)	Son of Analogue (2011)

He Was King is an album recorded by Felix da Housecat, released worldwide just two days before his 38th birthday on August 25, 2009 via Nettwerk Records. The album was described by Felix as follows, "Whereas Kittenz and Thee Glitz was straight up electro, He Was King is straight Felix da Housecat pop with a nice electronic feel."

The first single released from the album was "Kickdrum", released as a digital download in May 2009. The second single, "We All Wanna Be Prince" featured a remix contest prior to its release in July.

== Reception ==
Professional ratings
Review scores
Source	Rating
Allmusic	3.5/5 stars
The A.V. Club	(unfavorable)
Pitchfork Media	(4.5/10)
Slant Magazine	3/5 stars
Spin	3/5 stars

Initial critical response to He Was King was average. At Metacritic, which assigns a normalized rating out of 100 to reviews from mainstream critics, the album has received an average score of 63, based on nine reviews.

== Track listing ==
All songs written by Felix da Housecat (Felix Stallings).

1. "We All Wanna Be Prince" — (3:33)
2. "Plastik Fantastik" — (3:29)
3. "Kickdrum" — (3:49)
4. "Do We Move Your World" — (4:35)
5. "We" — (4:20)
6. "Spank U Very Much" — (2:32)
7. "Do Not Try This at Home" — (4:08)
8. "Turn Me on a Summer Smile" — (3:39)
9. "Elvi$" — (6:06)
10. "LA Ravers" — (3:47)
11. "Machine" — (3:31)
12. "He Was King" — (3:23)
