= Devin Dazzle & the Neon Fever =

Studio album by Felix da Housecat
- Released: May 25, 2004
- Genre: Dance; electronic; electroclash
- Length: 48:03
- Label: Rude Photo; Emperor Norton; Rykodisc
- Producer: Felix da Housecat, Dave the Hustler, Tommie Sunshine, GoodandEvil, Clover

Felix da Housecat chronology
A Bugged Out Mix (2003)	Devin Dazzle & the Neon Fever (2004)	Playboy: The Mansion Soundtrack (2005)

Singles from Devin Dazzle & the Neon Fever
- 1. "Ready 2 Wear" Released: 2005

Professional ratings
Aggregate scores
Source	Rating
Metacritic	73/100
Review scores
Source	Rating
AllMusic	3.5/5 stars
Blender	3/5 stars
Pitchfork Media	(7.8/10)
Playlouder	4.5/5 stars
Stylus	B+

Devin Dazzle & the Neon Fever is a 2004 album by Felix da Housecat, his first since 2001's Kittenz and Thee Glitz and continued his collaboration with both Tommie Sunshine and Dave the Hustler. It is a concept album based on the story of the character Devin Dazzle and his involvement with a group of women called the Neon Fever. The album is Felix's highest-charting album to date. The album features the work of many collaborators including LCD Soundsystem's James Murphy, Dave the Hustler, Tommie Sunshine, GoodandEvil, XLover, Tyrone "Visionary" Palmer and Kate Wax. "Everyone Is Someone in L.A." was featured in Activision's 2005 Tony Hawk skateboarding video game Tony Hawk's American Wasteland, whereas the Soulwax remix of "Rocket Ride" has been featured in EA's Need for Speed: Underground 2. The album cover was designed by new media artist Kenneth Tin-Kin Hung.

== Track listing ==
Writing credits and notes adopted from Discogs.

1. "Intro" – 0:04
2. "Rocket Ride" (Tommie Sunshine) – 2:37
3. "What She Wants" (James Murphy) – 5:08
4. "Short Skirts" (The Neon Fever) – 2:18
5. "Ready 2 Wear" (Tyrone "Visionary" Palmer) – 3:41
6. "Romantique" (Devin Dazzle, Kate Wax and XLover) – 2:05
7. "Everyone Is Someone in L.A." (Tommie Sunshine) – 4:00
8. "She's So D*mn Cool" (Felix da Housecat) – 2:51
9. "Let Your Mind Be Your Bed" (Kate Wax) – 3:31
10. "Watching Cars Go By" (Donna the CyberWh*re) – 5:27
11. "Hunting Season" (The Neon Fever (Sarah Jane, Estelle, Laurence and Natalia)) – 4:10
12. "Nitelife Funworld" (Felix da Housecat) – 1:40
13. "Nina" (Devin Dazzle and Liz Wiz) – 2:32
14. "Devin Dazzle" (Tyrone "Visionary" Palmer) – 2:51
15. "Neon Human" (Dave the Hustler) – 5:09

Notes

- Track 2 is performed by The Neon Fever (Jenny, Estelle, Natalia, Sarah Jane).
- Track 3 is performed by "the amazing" James Murphy.
- Track 4 is performed by The Neon Fever (Estelle and Laurence).
- Track 5 is performed by Tyrone "Visionary" Palmer.
- Track 6 is performed by Kate Wax and Nina Rai.
- Track 7 is performed by Tommie Sunshine and The Neon Fever (Cristina, Natalia, Sarah Jane).
- Track 8 is performed by Felix da Housecat.
- Track 9 is performed by Kate Wax.
- Track 10 is performed by Donna the CyberWh*re.
- Track 11 is performed by The Neon Fever (Sarah Jane, Estelle and Laurence).
- Track 12 is performed by Felix da Housecat.
- Track 13 is performed by Liz Wiz.
- Track 14 is performed by Tyrone "Visionary" Palmer.
- Track 15 is performed by Tyrone "Visionary" Palmer.
