= Kenneth Tin-Kin Hung =

Chinese-American new media artist

Kenneth Tin-Kin Hung 洪天健
- Born: 洪天健 Kenneth; Hong Kong, China
- Education: San Francisco State University
- Known for: new media
- Awards: "Tribeca Film Institute Media Arts Fellowships," "Honorary Mention- Net Excellence- Prix Ars Electronica"

Kenneth Tin-Kin Hung (Chinese: 洪天健; pinyin: Hóng Tiānjiàn) is a Chinese-American new media artist who lives and works in New York. He earned his Bachelor of Arts in Arts degree from San Francisco State University. Hung's works are digital collages of popular culture and current events. His media includes hi-definition video animation, video games, net.art, digital graphics and mixed-media installations. Hung has been called the "John Heartfield of Digital Era". He loans 5 percent of his art earnings to low-income entrepreneurs listed on Kiva Microfunds.

== Exhibitions ==
His work has been exhibited at the New Museum, New York; Yerba Buena Center for the Arts, San Francisco; Berkeley Art Museum, Berkeley, California; Sundance Film Festival, Park City, Utah; Postmasters Gallery, New York; Cartwright Hall, Bradford, United Kingdom; Urbis, Manchester, United Kingdom; Galerie Guy Bärtschi, Geneva, Switzerland; Hebbel am Ufer theatre, Berlin, Germany and ARoS Aarhus Kunstmuseum, Aarhus, Denmark.

== Awards ==
- Tribeca Film Institute Media Arts Fellowships
- "VIPER International Award- Internet" in Switzerland
- "Honorary Mention- Net Excellence" in the 2002 Prix Ars Electronica.

== Works ==
- 腦殘遊記 The Travelogue of Dr. Brain Damages (2011)
- In G.O.D. We Trust (2009)
- Gas Zappers (2008)
- Residential Erection (2008)
- Because Washington Is Hollywood For Ugly People (2007)
- Global Presidential Election (2003)
- 60X1.CAM ULTIMATE INTERACTIVE WEBCAM SURVEILLANCE SYSTEM FOR HOMELAND SECURITY (2003)
- www.111111111111111111111111111111111111111111111111111111111111.com (2001–2025)

== Commission Works ==
- In 2004 he is commissioned by architect Rem Koolhaas and Office for Metropolitan Architecture to design the cover of their book "Content".
- He is hired to design and create illustrations for electroclash artist Felix Da Housecat's album "Devin Dazzle & the Neon Fever".
- He provides designs and illustration for hip-hop artist The Coup's album "Pick A Bigger Weapon".
- He designs and illustrates Italian ska artist Roy Paci & Arestuka's "SuonoGlobal" album.
- He is hired by Lane Crawford to create large pop-up book sculptures for their 2009 "Popstatic" campaign.

== Press ==
His work has been reviewed in the following publication among many others:

- The New York Times
- Art in America
- The Village Voice
- Libération
- Le Monde
- El País
- Der Spiegel
- La Repubblica
- Art Asia Pacific
- San Francisco Bay Guardian
- The Miami Herald

He is represented by Postmasters Gallery in New York, U.S.A. and Galerie Guy Bärtschi in Geneva, Switzerland.
