= We All Wanna Be Prince =

Single by Felix da Housecat

from the album He Was King
- Released: 2009
- Recorded: 2008–2009
- Genre: Electroclash
- Length: 3:33
- Label: Nettwerk
- Songwriters: Alain Croisy, Felix da Housecat
- Producer: Felix da Housecat

Felix da Housecat singles chronology
"Kickdrum" (2009)	"We All Wanna Be Prince" (2009)	"Thee Anthem" (2010)

Music video
- "We All Wanna Be Prince" on YouTube

"We All Wanna Be Prince" is a song performed by American recording artist Felix da Housecat. Co-written by Alex Croisy, it was released as the album's second single in July 2009. The song was offered as the "Free MP3 of the Day" on Spinner.

== Background ==
"We All Wanna Be Prince" is written by Alex Croisy and Felix da Housecat, while the latter produced the song. In an interview with Spinner, Felix explained the significance of writing the song as a tribute to Prince : "Prince is one of the most brilliant, talented and influential musicians of all time, and without him, many contemporary musicians would be nowhere." In a post from his blog, Felix da Housecat described the recording of the song.

"Like Prince, we slowed my voice down, recorded me half speed through the computer and then sped me up. I sang it slow like "Erotic City" and we were cracking up. Then I played [guest vocalist] Ness some Wendy & Lisa and I brought her in and out of the track. It was a joke but then when the track was done, we realised we really had something!"

== Composition ==
"We All Wanna Be Prince" is credited as a song with Europop influences, and is also influenced by Prince.

== Critical reception ==
Jess Harvell of Pitchfork Media described the song as "so stagnant and obvious that you keep waiting for some conceptual punchline only to walk away with the dead air greeting a joke that fell on its face."

== Track listing ==
- Digital download (Miss Kittin Remixes)
1. "We All Wanna Be Prince" (Kittin Karaoke Princess Style Mix) - 3:33
2. "We All Wanna Be Prince" (Princess In A Trance Mix) - 6:53
- US CD single
1. "We All Wanna Be Prince" - 3:33
2. "We All Wanna Be Prince" (Paper Faces Remix) - 6:39
3. "We All Wanna Be Prince" (Joachim Garraud Vocal Remix) - 7:17
4. "We All Wanna Be Prince" (Joachim Garraud Dub Remix) - 7:43
5. "We All Wanna Be Prince" (Clean Version) - 3:31
6. "We All Wanna Be Prince" (Instrumental Mix) - 3:33
7. "We All Wanna Be Prince" (Danny Howells Delirious Remix) - 7:32
8. "We All Wanna Be Prince" (port-royal Remix) - 3:17
9. "We All Wanna Be Prince" (GreyGhost & Deth Hertz Remix) - 5:58

== Charts ==
Chart (2009)	Peak Position
US Dance Club Songs (Billboard)	26
