= Fear and Trembling =

1843 philosophical work by Søren Kierkegaard

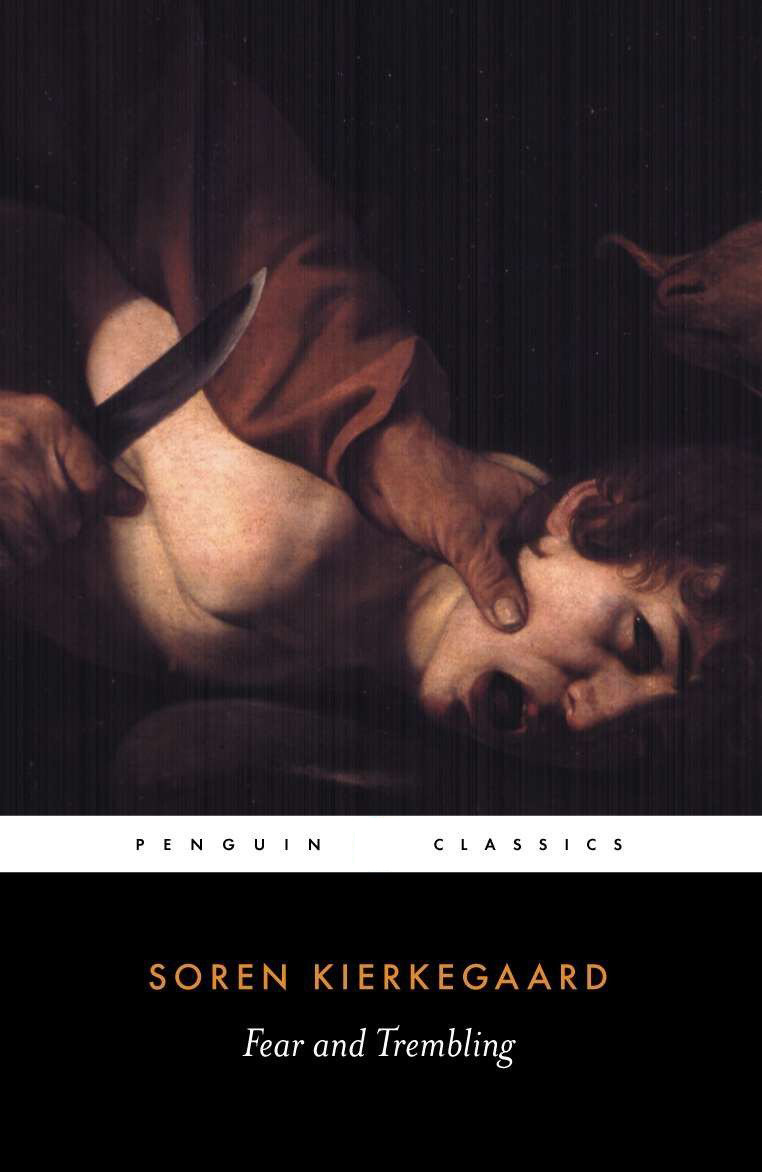
- Front cover of the Penguin Classics edition
- Author: Søren Kierkegaard
- Original title: Frygt og Bæven
- Language: Danish
- Genre: Philosophy
- Published: October 16, 1843
- Publisher: C. A. Reitzel, Copenhagen
- English publication date: 1941
- Preceded by: Two Upbuilding Discourses
- Followed by: Three Upbuilding Discourses
- Text: Fear and Trembling at Wikisource

Fear and Trembling (Danish: Frygt og Bæven) is a philosophical work by Søren Kierkegaard, published in 1843 under the pseudonym Johannes de silentio (Latin for John of the Silence). It is widely regarded as one of Kierkegaard's most influential texts and a foundational contribution to the philosophy of religion and existentialism.

The work is an extended meditation on Genesis 22, also known as the Binding of Isaac. Johannes de silentio examines the tension between ethical duty and faith through an analysis of Abraham's psychological state during his journey to Moriah. The text argues that it is impossible to understand Abraham's actions through the ethical framework of Hegel's philosophy. Rather, the actions can only be understood through a distinct category—faith.

The title references Philippians 2:12, "continue to work out your salvation with fear and trembling". The Philippians verse is thought to reference Psalm 55:5.

== Summary ==
The work starts with an "Exordium", or prologue that presents four different retellings of the Binding of Isaac. In each, Abraham is prepared and willing to follow God's command to sacrifice Isaac, but something goes wrong. Abraham or Isaac loses faith, or Abraham is overcome with guilt. Silentio does not consider any of these retellings of Abraham to have genuine faith, which establishes that willingness to obey God does not constitute faith on its own.

The "Exordium" is followed by the "Eulogy on Abraham", in which Silentio recounts Abraham's life and accomplishments, praising him as the "father of faith". The emphasis of the section is that the greatness of Abraham is not just in his willingness to sacrifice Isaac, but also his belief that God would either not require it or restore him. Faith is what distinguishes Abraham from other figures associated with sacrifice or loss.

The "Preliminary Expectoration" introduces the central distinction of the work: the difference between faith and infinite resignation. Silentio uses knights as examples of the contrast between the two positions. The knight of infinite resignation renounces what he loves and accepts the finality of the loss. On the other hand, the knight of faith is able to make an additional movement beyond the finality. Silentio describes the move as being made "by virtue of the absurd". The knight believes that he will receive back what he has given up, or be restored and made whole in some way. Silentio admits that he can understand infinite resignation, but not faith. The admission serves as introduction to the three Problemata that make up the rest of the text.

== Central argument ==
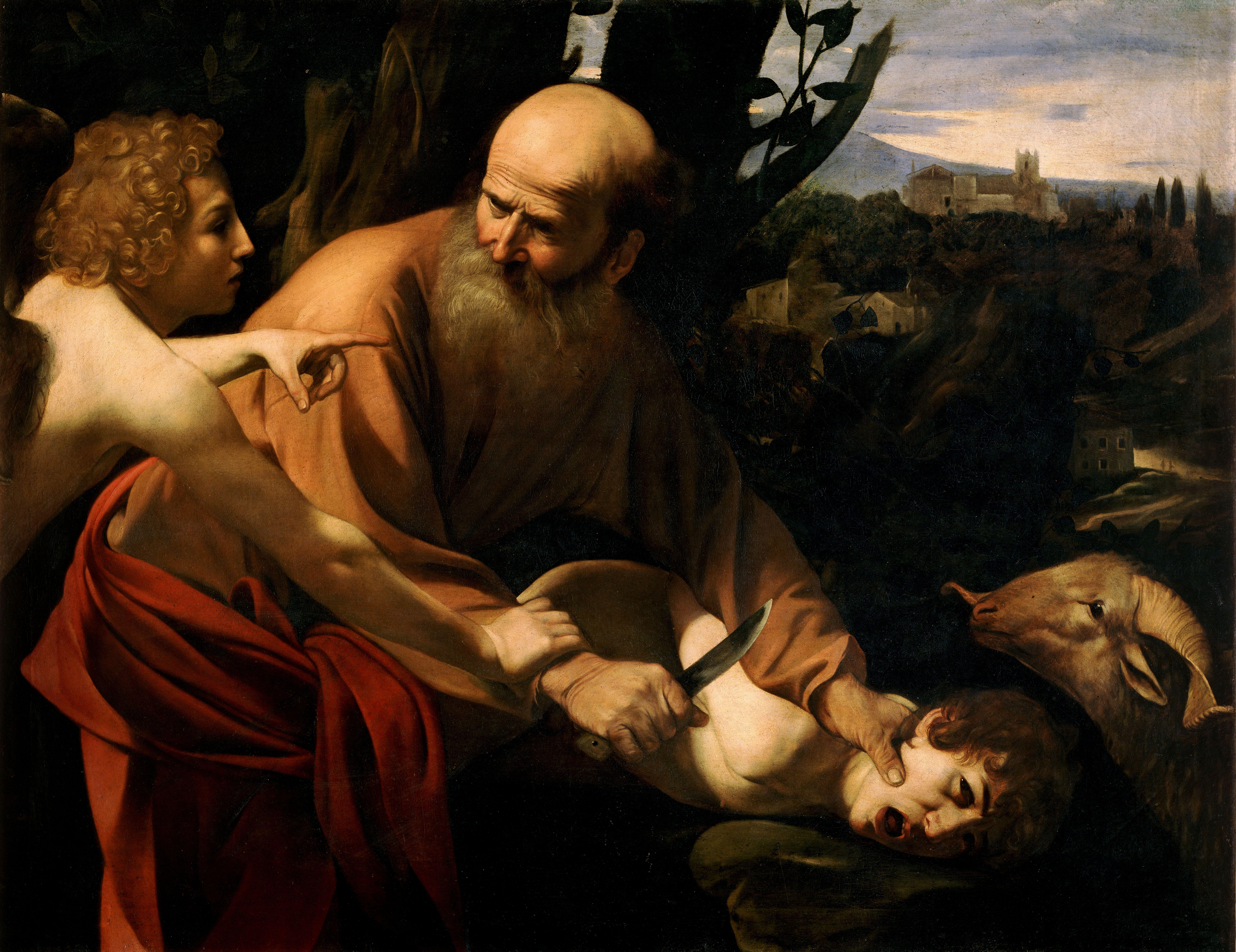
The Sacrifice of Isaac, Caravaggio (1603)

The core claim of Fear and Trembling is that it is impossible to understand Abraham through rational ethical thinking. Using frameworks of Greek philosophy or Hegel leads to a reductio ad absurdum. Silentio's argument is that either there exists a category that must transcend ethical reasoning, or faith does not exist. If the latter were true, Abraham's characterization as the "father of faith" is inaccurate. The text argues for the former position, in that faith is the category that transcends ethics, and that Abraham's relationship to God cannot be logically mediated through standard ethical means. Silentio identifies three Problemata, or problems, and uses them to structure a defense of his argument.

== Three Problemata ==
The second half of Fear and Trembling is made up of three Problemata, through which Johannes de silentio examines if Abraham's actions can be understood through rational ethical thinking or if they require the distinct category of faith. They are:

- Problema I: Is there a Teleological Suspension of the Ethical?
- Problema II: Is there an Absolute Duty to God?
- Problema III: Was It Ethically Defensible for Abraham to Conceal His Undertaking from Sarah, from Eliezer, and from Isaac?

=== Problema I: Teleological suspension of the ethical ===
Silentio identifies the ethical with the universal, which in his framework is incumbent upon all people at all times. Sin occurs when an individual asserts himself over and against the universal. Faith, on the other hand, is a paradox whereby an individual transcends the universal without sinning. Johannes de Silentio argues that Abraham must occupy this category of faith, because without doing so, he would not be the "father of the faith".

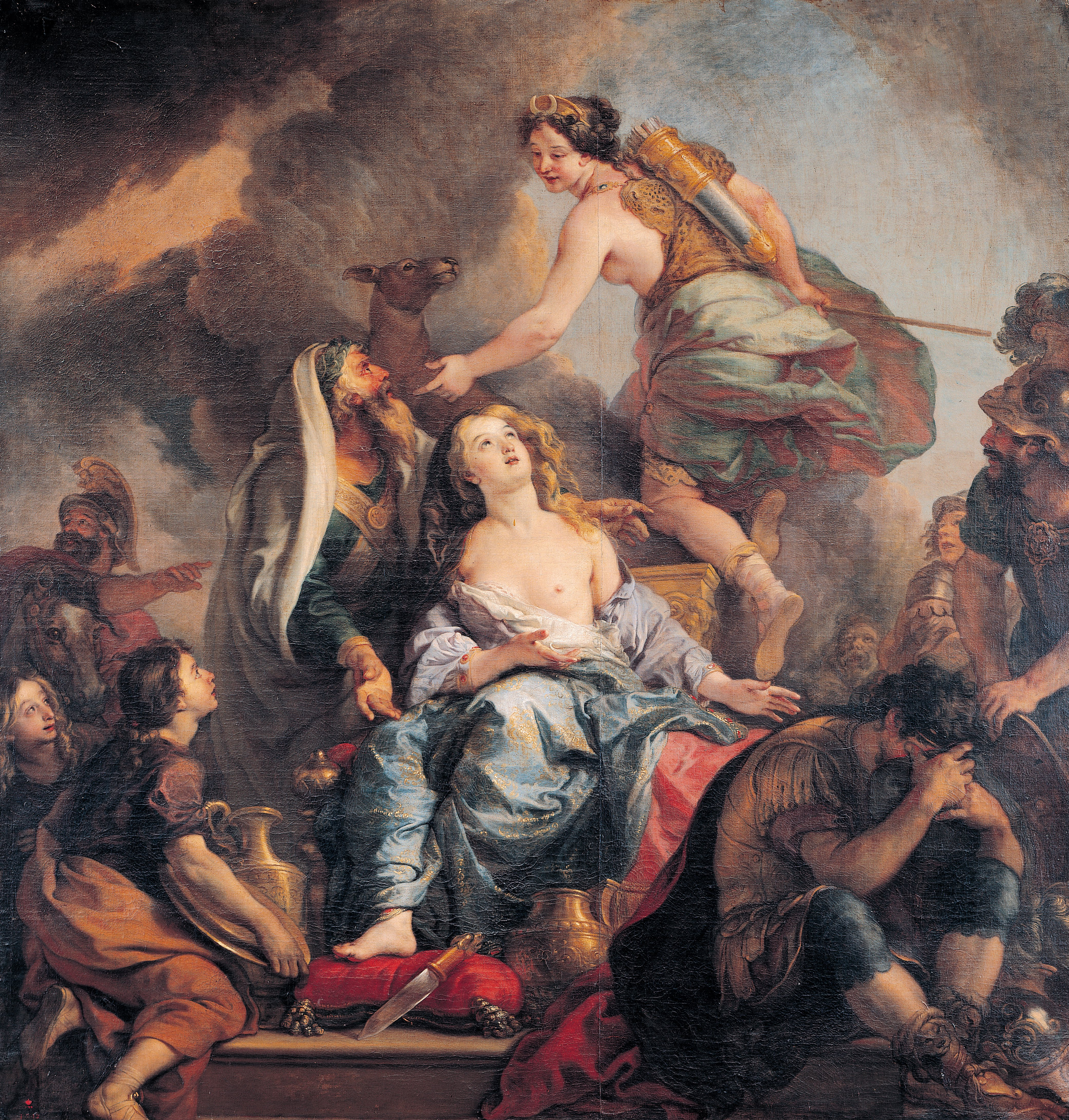
Sacrifice of Iphigenia, Charles de La Fosse (~1680)

Abraham's relationship to God during the binding cannot be logically understood or mediated away according to Silentio. To illustrate, he contrasts Abraham with three other historical and mythological figures—Agamemnon, Jephthah, and Brutus—who similarly had to sacrifice or punish their offspring. Agamemnon had to sacrifice his daughter Iphigenia in order for the Greek fleet to sail to Troy; Jephthah had to sacrifice his daughter after a victory to fulfill a public vow to God; and Brutus had to order the execution of his sons for conspiring against him. Fear and Trembling argues that all three are perceived as tragic heroes, because their sacrifices served an ethical purpose that their communities could understand. The decisions made can be justified and mourned within a rational framework of universal ethics.

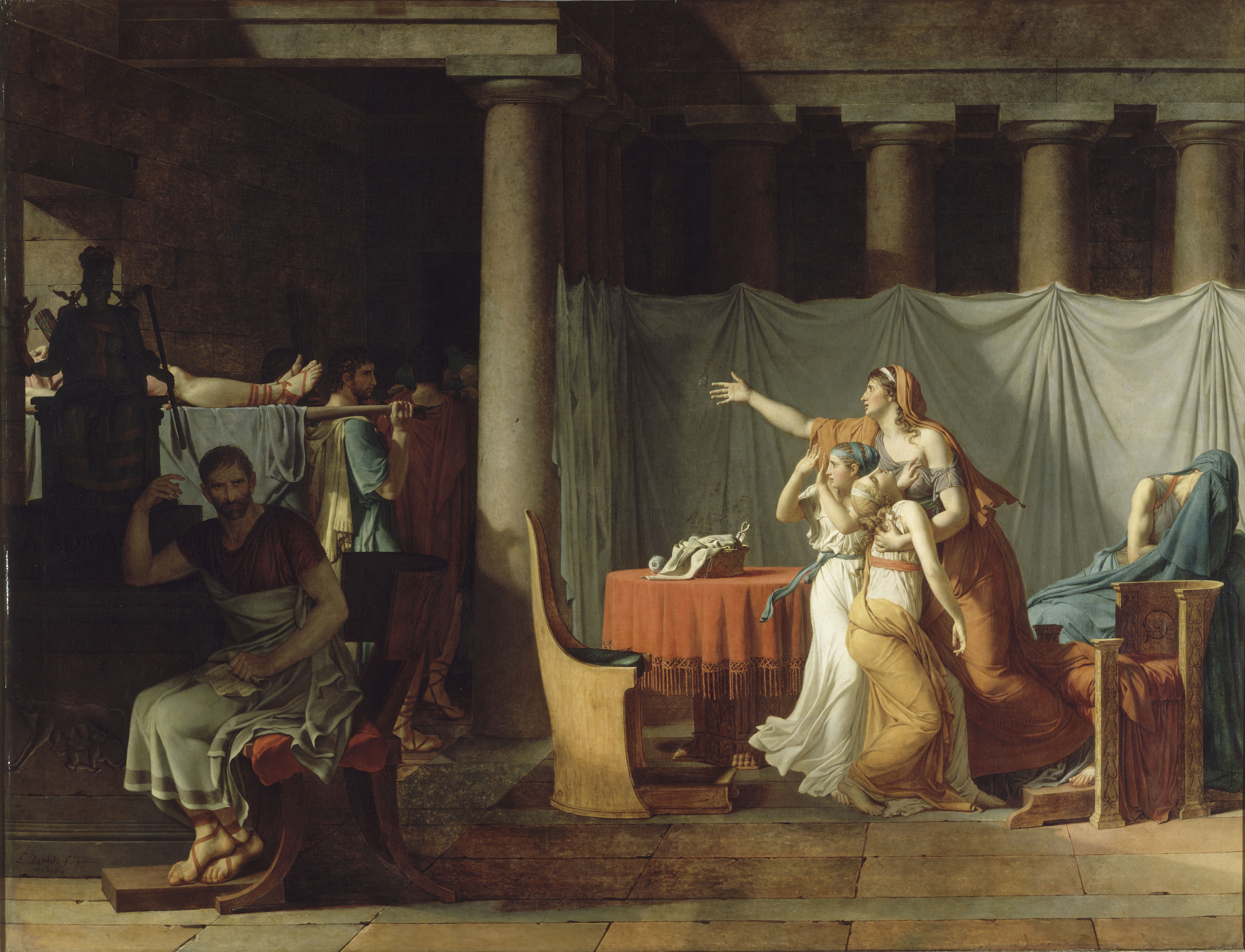
The Lictors Bring to Brutus the Bodies of His Sons, David (1789)

Abraham's situation is fundamentally different for Silentio. Abraham does not sacrifice Isaac for the sake of a nation, community, or public vow. Silentio's argument states that the act is completely unintelligible to a rational system of ethics, the only justification that Abraham holds is in his absolute relationship to God, which does not lend itself to universal ethical discussion. The distinction lies in what the author calls the middle term: tragic heroes transgress the ethical for a higher yet still comprehensible purpose, but Abraham's transgression cannot be publicly justified. His purpose is dictated solely by his direct relationship with God, which is what places him into the category of faith rather than that of the tragic hero.

=== Problema II: Absolute duty to God ===
Problema II focuses on whether an individual can have an absolute duty to God, overriding all other ethical duties. In contrast to Problema I, Problema II deals not with what kind of ethical suspension occurs, or how it comes to be, but why it must be the case for Abraham. Silentio argues that in an ethical framework an individual's relationship to God is created and maintained through fulfillment of ethical obligations. Silentio's critical move is to present a reversal of this relationship: in faith, the individual mediates his relationship to the universal through his relationship with God.

Silentio asserts that a knight of faith exists in pure isolation and cannot explain himself or his actions to others. If a knight of faith were to try to explain himself to others, this would be done in terms of the universal and would constitute "temptation" (Anfechtung)—a fallback to rational ethics that negates the movement of faith. Silentio reaffirms that faith is then an incommunicable paradox known only to the individual in question and to God.

=== Problema III: Abraham's concealment ===
Problema III analyzes the question of whether Abraham's concealment of the ordeal from Sarah, Eliezer, and Isaac is ethically defensible. Silentio's answer to the question depends on what he identifies as the ethical, which he defines as not just the universal, but also the disclosed. To Silentio, it is critical that Abraham cannot be acting ethically in his concealment, since Abraham is obeying God's command directly and not explaining himself to anyone.

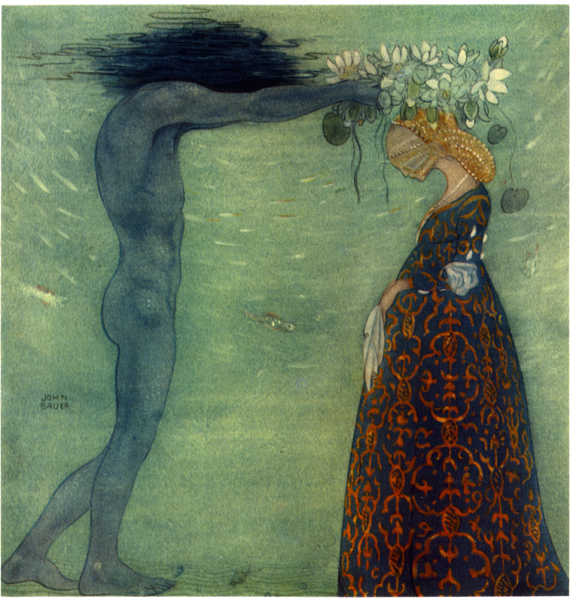
The Sea King's Queen (Swedish: Sjökungens drottning), John Bauer (1911) for Helena Nyblom's retelling of Agnete and the merman

Problema III introduces two categories to explain Abraham's position: the aesthetic and the demonic. Silentio claims that aesthetics rewards concealment while the ethical demands disclosure. Silentio draws the contrast through the ends for which concealment is valued, where in the aesthetic it is valued for dramatic effect or personal interest. In the case of the demonic, concealment is based on sin or guilt, through which one asserts himself above the universal through sin rather than faith. Fear and Trembling uses the folk tale of Agnete and the merman to illustrate the distinction. The merman conceals his intention to seduce out of guilt, therefore placing him in the demonic. The distinction allows Silentio to argue that concealment can place one in either the divine or the demonic, depending on what motivates the silence. In Abraham's case, silence is not a product of guilt or sin but of the incommunicability of his faith.

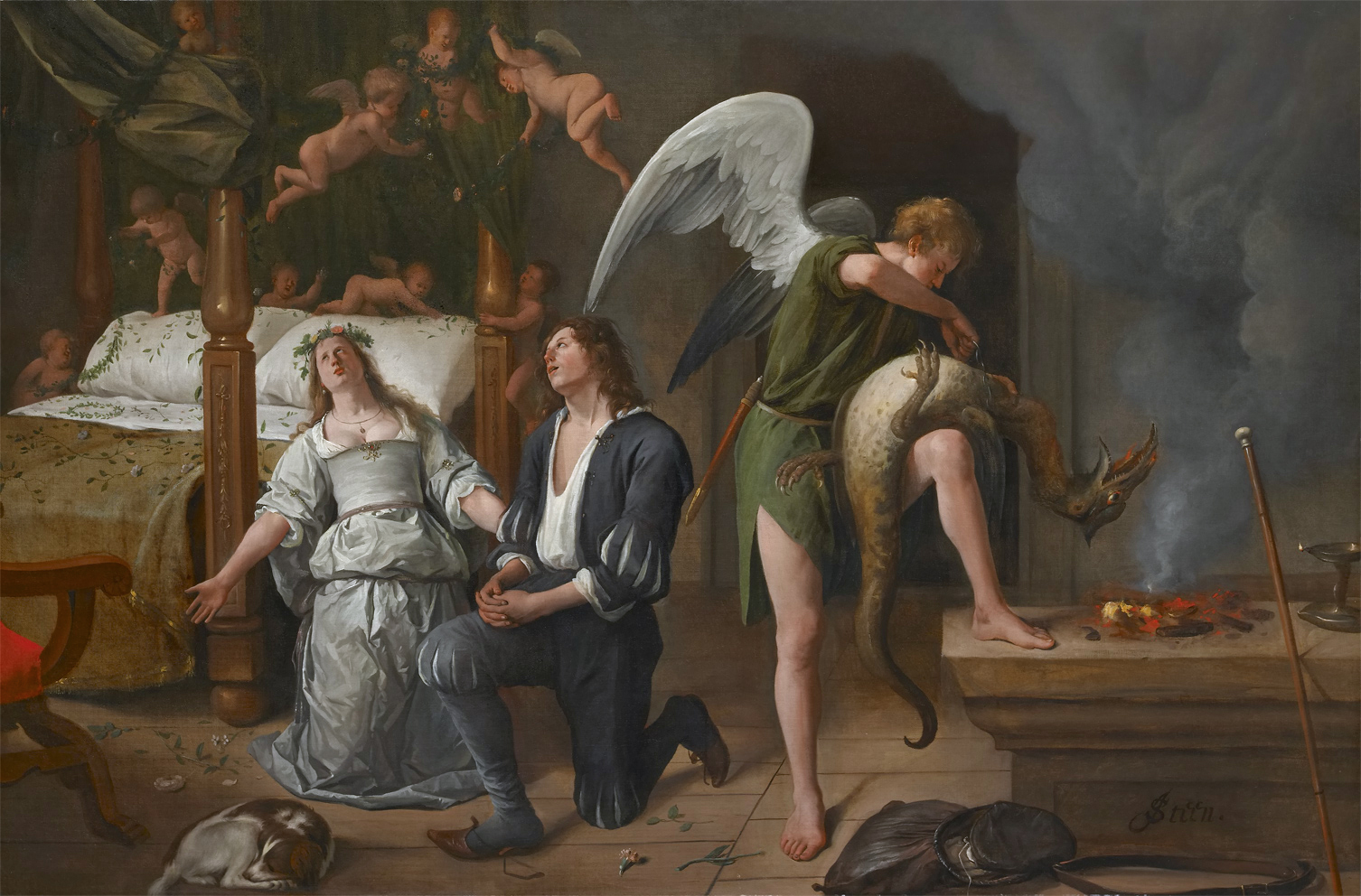
Tobias and Sarah in Prayer with the Angel Raphael and the Demon, Jan Steen (1668)

Throughout Problema III, Silentio draws on a series of folkloric myths and figures. Such as the account Aristotle provides of a bridegroom who discovers from the Oracle at Delphi that his marriage will bring calamity; this example is used to explore if disclosure is required, ethically, when it would destroy happiness. Silentio also analyzes the story of Sarah from the Book of Tobit, whose previous seven husbands were killed by a demon on their wedding night. In the case of Sarah, her willingness to marry Tobias despite her past illustrates an absurd leap of faith. Finally, Silentio uses the figure of Faust, a doubter who remains silent so as not to throw the world into chaos, illustrating a silence grounded in guilt rather than faith, distinguishing it from Abraham's. The illustrations explain how the dynamics of concealment and disclosure in these stories interact with the categories of the aesthetic, ethical, and religious, and how these tensions are resolved through serendipity, self-sacrifice, or appeal to the absurd.

Silentio concludes that a tragic hero's sacrifice is mediated by a cultural context or public disclosure that justifies the action and makes it comprehensible to others. This is not the case for Abraham; his silence is not a concealment for personal interests or dramatic effect. The concealment is a necessary condition of his incommunicable faith.

== Reception and influence ==
=== Contemporary reception ===
At the time of its publication in 1843, Fear and Trembling did not draw much attention outside of local Copenhagen intellectual circles and the first monograph on Kierkegaard would not be published until 1877. His works were largely ignored until the beginning of the 20th century. Kierkegaard, however, believed that the work would secure a lasting reputation for himself, and would be translated into many languages, which he wrote about in his journals.

=== Influence on existentialism ===
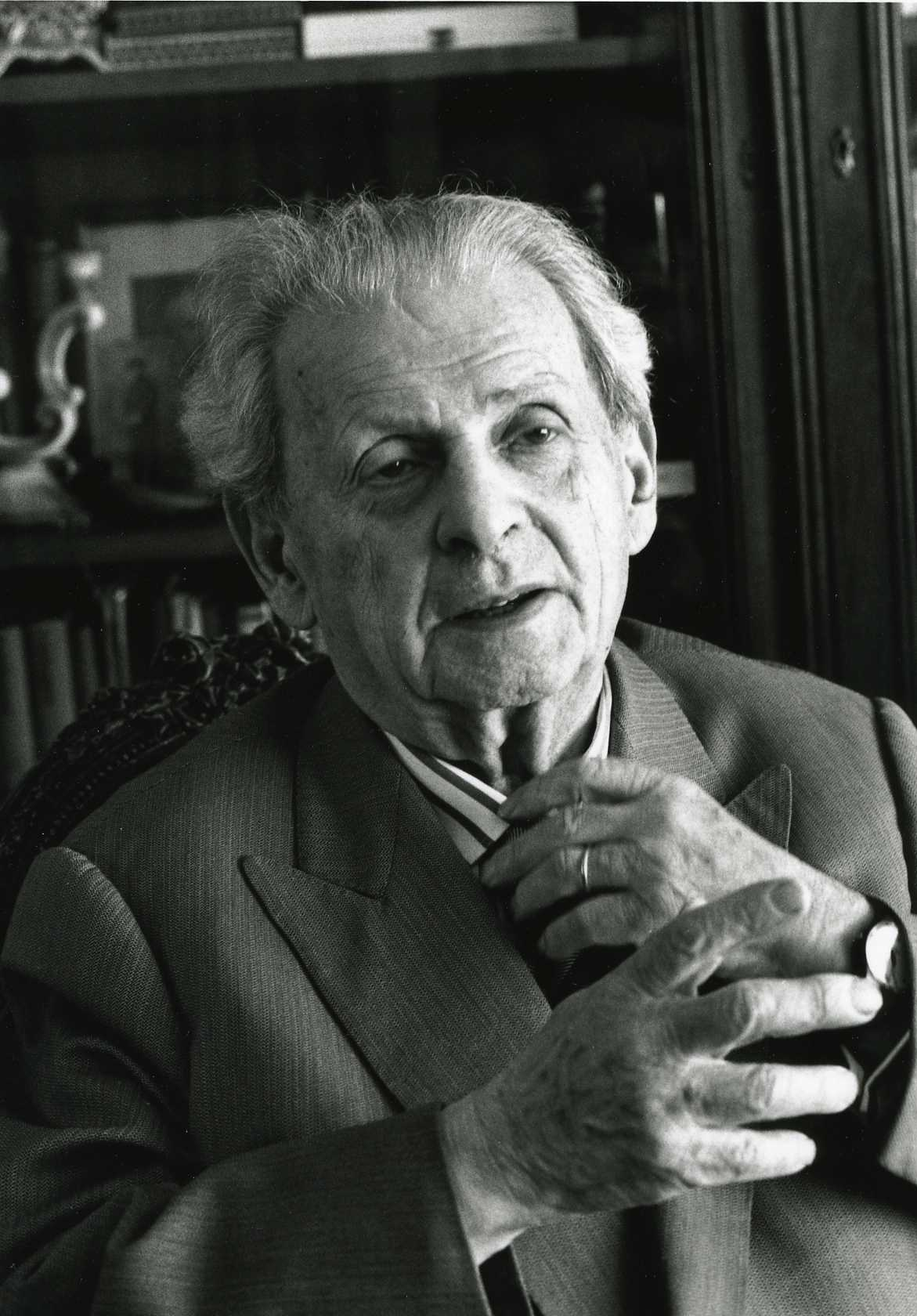
Emmanuel Levinas (1906–1995)

During the 20th century Kierkegaard's works, and specifically Fear and Trembling, became widely read after being translated into German, French, and English in the early 1900s. The rise of the existentialist movement caused Kierkegaard's reputation as a philosopher to grow significantly, with existentialists citing him as an early precursor to the movement. Many of the ideas and concepts referenced by Kierkegaard in Fear and Trembling such as the individual, limits of rational ethics, and difficulty of choice without external justification became key in existentialist thought.

Jean-Paul Sartre invoked the story of Abraham from Fear and Trembling in his 1946 lecture titled Existentialism is a Humanism, illustrating the uncertainty about whether a command is truly from God or from the person himself. Sartre used Abraham's doubt as an example of a problem with all human decision-making; every person's action asserts a normative claim. Even though Sartre rejected Kierkegaard's theism, he heavily referenced the structure of existential choice in Fear and Trembling.

Karl Barth and the dialectical theology movement, established through Between the Times (German: Zwischen den Zeiten) in 1922, drew on Kierkegaard's paradox of faith examined in Fear and Trembling. Barth used Abraham's incommunicable relationship with God to emphasize the infinite distinction that exists between God and humanity. Kierkegaard's analysis of anxiety and the individual is referenced in Martin Heidegger's Being and Time (1927) drawing briefly on themes present in Fear and Trembling.

The 1964 UNESCO colloquium on Kierkegaard held in Paris, at which Sartre delivered the lecture "The Singular Universal", is generally regarded as the decisive consolidation of Kierkegaard's place in existentialism.

=== Philosophical interpretation ===
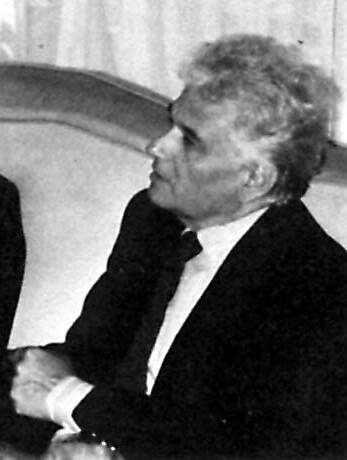
Jacques Derrida (1930–2004)

Fear and Trembling has been a subject of extensive philosophical inquiry, specifically on the faith that the text attributes to Abraham. John H. Whittaker argues that the teleological suspension of the ethical can be seen as an analogy for justification by faith, which is the Christian doctrine in which salvation is achieved directly through a relationship with God rather than rational or ethical means. By contrast, John J. Davenport offers an eschatological reading, arguing that Abraham's movement of infinite resignation consigns the aesthetic and ethical goods of the matter away from his power, and directly into the hands of God.

Jacques Derrida's The Gift of Death (1992; French: Donner la mort) devotes a large portion to an analysis of Fear and Trembling. Derrida uses Abraham's paradox of secrecy and duty to God to examine the structure of ethical decision-making, arguing how every decision that prioritizes one obligation over another mirrors Abraham's paradox.

Emmanuel Levinas was critical of Kierkegaard's interpretation; in 1963 he offered a substantial critique of Fear and Trembling in his essay "Existence and Ethics". Levinas criticized Kierkegaard's teleological suspension of the ethical, arguing that it allows an individual's relationship to God to override ethical claims of the other person, which he characterized as a form of violence. Levinas claimed that Kierkegaard misrepresented ethics as a universal impersonal obligation, when in actuality it is a personal responsibility to each singular other. Levinas's and Derrida's readings of Fear and Trembling are often discussed in dialogue with one another and mark an important point of debate in philosophy of religion and ethics.

=== Literary influence ===
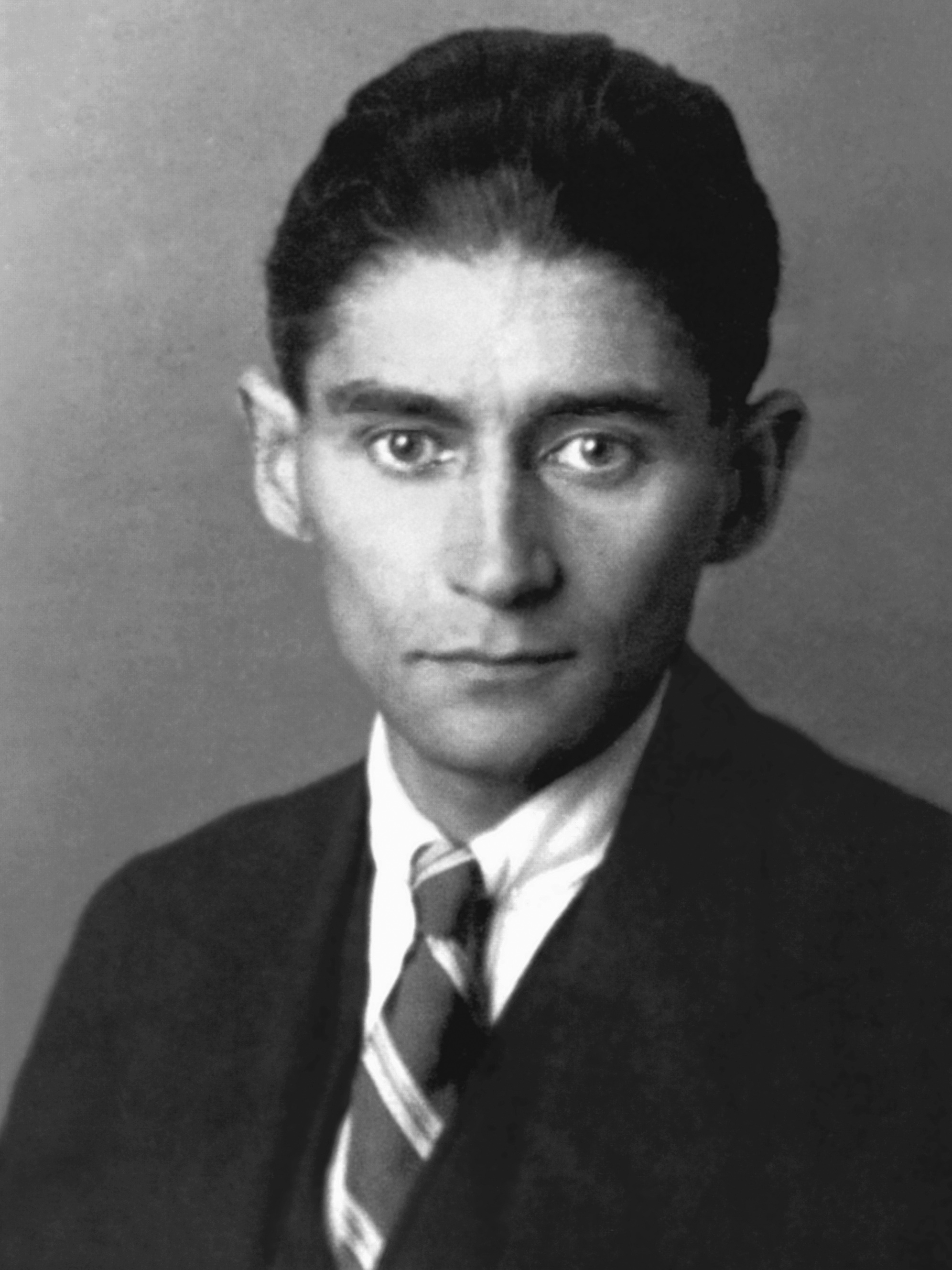
Franz Kafka (1883–1924)

Franz Kafka engaged extensively with Abraham's portrayal in Fear and Trembling both in his letters and unpublished fragments. Kafka offered a literary response to the story rather than a philosophical analysis. In a March 1918 letter to Max Brod, Kafka wrote:

In Fear and Trembling, for example – which you ought to read now – his affirmativeness turns truly monstrous and is checked only when it comes up against a perfectly ordinary helmsman. What I mean is, affirmativeness becomes objectionable when it reaches too high. He doesn't see the ordinary man (with whom, on the whole, he knows how to talk remarkably well) and paints this monstrous Abraham in the clouds.

In June 1921, writing to Robert Klopstock, Kafka proposed a series of alternative Abrahams to the ones written about in Fear and Trembling. These example figures were either asked to make the sacrifice before they had a son, were in the middle of building their house when God made the request, or believed that a different Abraham was being called upon. Jill Robbins, a comparative literature scholar, interprets Kafka's response as a literary engagement with the concept of faith, stripping it of the certainty that Silentio grants Abraham in Fear and Trembling.

John Updike read Fear and Trembling in 1955 or early 1956 and later called it the book that changed him, writing that for a time he thought of all his fiction as ‘illustrations of Kierkegaard.’ David Crowe’s study of Updike’s Kierkegaard traces how that early encounter shaped the theology of his fiction, including the Maples stories.

== Notable objections ==
=== Dangerous-precedent objection ===
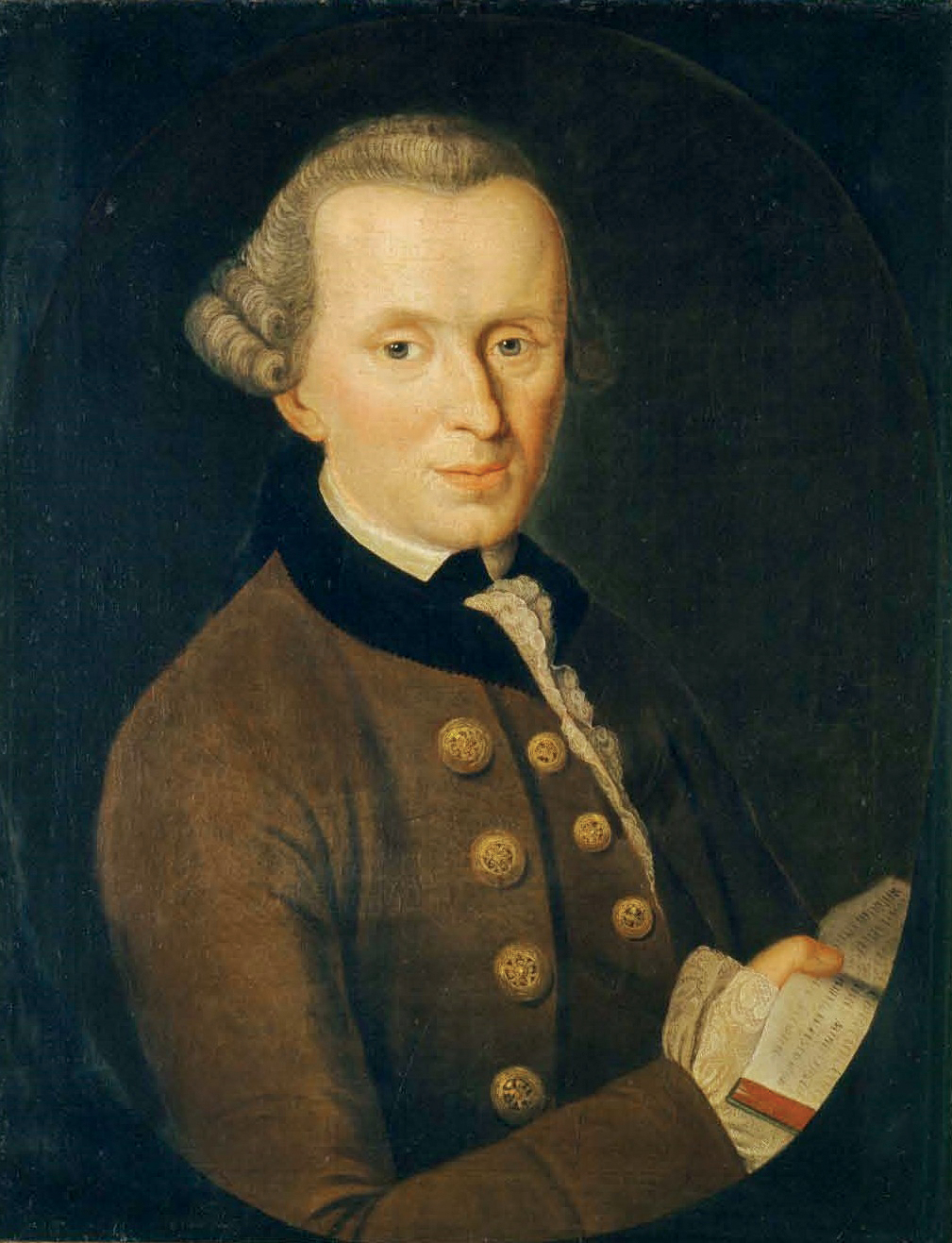
Immanuel Kant (1724–1804)

Levinas's critique of Kierkegaard is the most prominent objection to the teleological suspension of the ethical, which is a key argument of Fear and Trembling. Levinas argued that allowing such an ethical suspension is dangerous because it permits the justification of violence in the name of religion. Operating "by virtue of the absurd" sets no rational checks on what one could do in the name of faith. If a relationship to God is all that is necessary to override ethical obligations to others, then any action, including violence against the innocent, can be justified by faith. But violence against the innocent is not permissible; therefore, for Levinas, Kierkegaard's teleological suspension of the ethical cannot hold. This concern is shared by other prominent philosophers, most notably Buber and Kant. Martin Buber wrote in Eclipse of God (1952) on the concerns of confusing demonic impulses with divine commands. The Kantian view is that no divine command could contradict the moral law, therefore either the command was not from God, or its moral interpretation is misunderstood.

=== Irrationalism objection ===
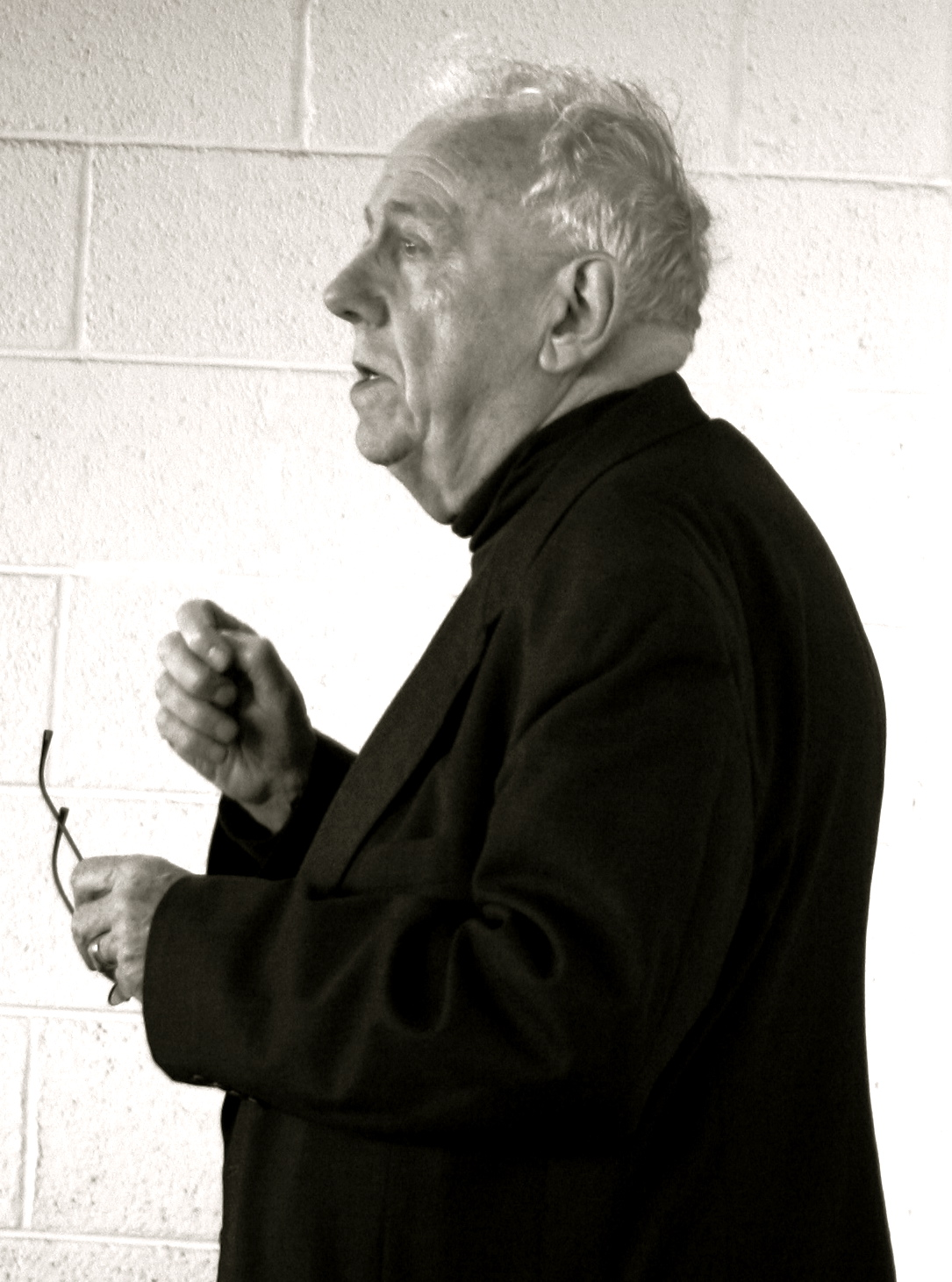
Alasdair MacIntyre (1929–2025)

Kierkegaard's concept of faith necessarily being "by virtue of the absurd" has been a consistent point of contention. Critics argue that relying on the absurd requires abandoning reason, therefore leading to irrationalism. In After Virtue (1981), Alasdair MacIntyre argued a similar point regarding criterionless choices present in Kierkegaard's other work Either/Or (1843). Although the charge is applied to a different work of Kierkegaard composed under a different pseudonym, critics such as J. Aaron Simmons have identified a similar problem in Fear and Trembling. Critics argue that if faith operates beyond rationality, then there is no way to distinguish faith from delusion.

Scholars such as C. Stephen Evans have argued that the absurd does not produce a logical contradiction; it is merely used to reference a point beyond rational calculation.

=== Internal-paradox objection ===
Johannes de silentio, the pseudonymous author of the work, admits that he cannot understand faith and cannot make the movement he describes. This creates a problem at the heart of the text where the author cannot comprehend the concept he is analyzing and praising. If faith itself is an incommunicable paradox, then the entire attempt to put it into writing using a rational framework is self-defeating and incomprehensible.

Those who see the admission as a devastating philosophical problem argue that the text cannot deliver on its own central premise. Others, such as Clare Carlisle, have argued that the admission is used as an illustration by the pseudonym to convey the incommunicability of the faith described in the work. In this instance, the paradox becomes the point of the argument rather than its fatal flaw, with the work designed to bring the reader to the threshold of the problem rather than crossing it.

== Relationship to Kierkegaard's biography ==
=== Regine Olsen ===
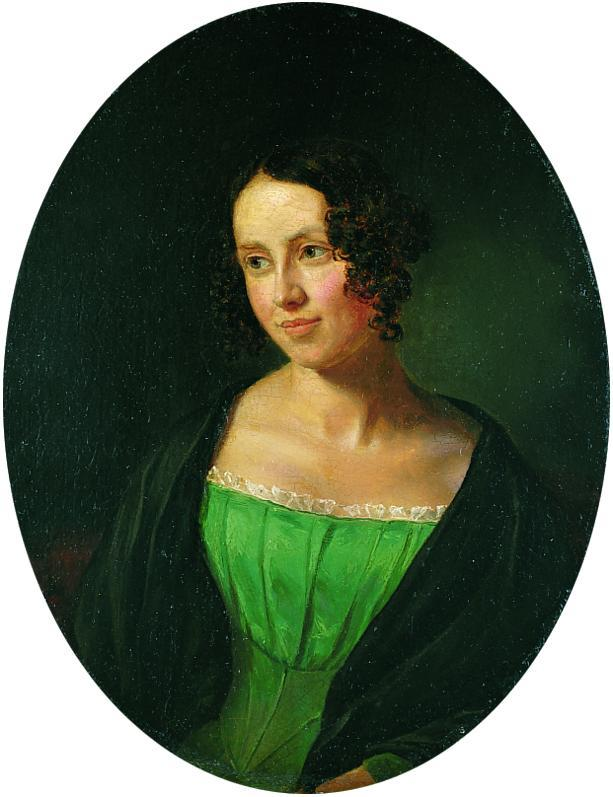
Regine Olsen (1822–1904)

Fear and Trembling was written in the period following Kierkegaard's broken engagement to Regine Olsen. Kierkegaard originally proposed to Olsen in September 1840 but broke off the engagement in October 1841. Shortly after this he traveled to Berlin, and composed the majority of the work. Fear and Trembling was published on October 16, 1843, along with his other work Repetition, which also contained themes of loss and hopes of recovery. Kierkegaard's attachment to Olsen persisted until his death in 1855, after which his will directed that his entire estate be left to her unconditionally. Kierkegaard wrote "to me an engagement was and is just as binding as a marriage, and that therefore my estate is her due, exactly as if I had been married to her." Olsen declined the inheritance.

Kierkegaard's journals contain multiple passages that connect his writing to Regine. Many commentators interpret the figure of the knight of faith, who renounces what he loves and believes he will receive it back "by virtue of the absurd", as a reflection on Kierkegaard's hope for reconciliation with Olsen. The extent to which a biographical reading is relevant in the case of Kierkegaard remains a topic of disagreement.

=== Pseudonyms ===
Kierkegaard resisted a biographical reading of his works, using pseudonyms to distance himself from his writing. In "A First and Last Explanation", appended to Concluding Unscientific Postscript (1846), he asked readers not to attribute the claims and views of his pseudonyms to him directly. The pseudonyms are distinct voices and their views are generally treated as those of the pseudonyms and not Kierkegaard himself. Fear and Trembling is accordingly meant to be read as the work of Johannes de silentio rather than Kierkegaard.

The pseudonym selected for Fear and Trembling, Johannes de silentio, reflects one of the central themes of Abraham's faith—its incommunicability. This ties into Problema III, which focuses on Abraham's inability to explain his situation to Sarah, Eliezer, or Isaac because it is not grounded in and therefore cannot be judged by universal ethics. Abraham must remain silent as the judgment is made through his personal relationship to God, and any attempt to explain that to another would be incomprehensible.

== Bibliography ==
- Conway, Daniel, ed. Kierkegaard's "Fear and Trembling": A Critical Guide. Cambridge Critical Guides. Cambridge University Press, 2015.
- Davenport, John J. "Faith as Eschatological Trust in Fear and Trembling." In Ethics, Love, and Faith in Kierkegaard: Philosophical Engagements. Edited by Edward F. Mooney. Indiana Series in the Philosophy of Religion, edited by Merold Westphal. Indiana University Press, 2008.
- Davenport, John J. "Kierkegaard's Postscript in Light of Fear and Trembling: Eschatological Faith." Revista Portuguesa de Filosofia 64, no. 2–4 (2008): 879–908. https://www.jstor.org/stable/40419592.
- Derrida, Jacques. The Gift of Death. Translated by David Wills. Religion and Postmodernism. University of Chicago Press, 1995.
- Evans, C. Stephen. "Introduction." In Fear and Trembling. Edited by C. Stephen Evans and Sylvia Walsh. Cambridge Texts in the History of Philosophy. Cambridge University Press, 2006.
- Garff, Joakim. Søren Kierkegaard: A Biography. Translated by Bruce H. Kirmmse. Princeton University Press, 2005.
- Kierkegaard, Søren. Fear and Trembling / Repetition. Edited and translated by Howard V. Hong and Edna H. Hong. Kierkegaard's Writings 6. Princeton University Press, 1983. K
- Kierkegaard, Søren. Fear and Trembling: Dialectical Lyric. Translated by Alexander Jech. Hackett Publishing Company, 2024.
- Levinas, Emmanuel. "Existence and Ethics." In Proper Names. Translated by Michael B. Smith. Stanford University Press, 1996.
- Whittaker, John H. "The Suspension of The Ethical in Fear and Trembling." Kierkegaardiana 14 (June 1988): 101–113. https://tidsskrift.dk/kierkegaardiana/article/view/31321/28794.
