= Port-royal (band) =

Italian electronica and post-rock band

port-royal
- Also known as: Up The Royals!
- Origin: Genoa, Italy
- Genres: Electronica; Post-Rock; Ambient; Trance
- Years active: 2000 - present
- Labels: Resonant Recordings; Chat Blanc Records n5MD debruit&desilence Sleeping Star; Isound Labels; Klik Records; Sangre D'Encre; Sound In Silence
- Members: Attilio Bruzzone; Ettore Di Roberto; Emilio Pozzolini; Sieva Diamantakos
- Past members: Giulio Corona; Michele Di Roberto
- Website: Official Website

port-royal (intentionally written without capitalization and with the "-" between "port" and "royal") is a Genoa, Italy-based electronica and post-rock band formed in the year 2000 by Attilio Bruzzone (Guitar, Keyboards) and Ettore Di Roberto (Piano, Keyboards). Soon after they were joined by Ettore's brother Michele Di Roberto (Drums), Emilio Pozzolini (Keyboards, Sampling), and Giulio Corona (Bass). The band's music emphasizes instrumentals over lyrics; a style resembling other instrumentally focused bands, such as Mogwai and M83.

== History ==
In July 2000, childhood friends Attilio (who is also a philosopher, Ph.D, and co-founder of the band Diamat, which released 2 albums via n5MD) and Ettore from Genoa, Italy, decided to form a band during a party. Their first practice session is Ettore's bedroom which had a piano and an acoustic guitar with a TASCAM 4 Track cassette recorder. In September, Ettore's younger brother and fellow drum player Michele joins the band and finds a name for the project. More sessions (guitar-synth/piano-drums) take place in the so-called "Saletta", nothing but a basement in the old Genovese city-center. Songs are written and some will be the melodic basis of future tracks, others will be forgotten. In February 2001, the band's line up is completed with the arrival of Emilio Pozzolini, a friend and schoolmate. All 4 port-royal members come from the very same high school, «Liceo Classico Statale "C. Colombo"». Throughout the years, the band would experience a shift in band members (never affecting the main members though), but the music would always preserve the same rigorous attitude and unique style, granted by experimenting a lot and mixing together various genres without never being swallowed up in one single direction/genre. In the last 10 years, port-royal experienced an extensive live activity together with the production of all their major works: they have been playing in all Europe, former Soviet Union, former Yugoslavia and the United States.

== Band members ==
=== Current members ===
- Attilio Bruzzone (Guitar, Keyboards, Programming, Bass and sometimes Vocals) 2000–Present
- Ettore Di Roberto (Piano, Keyboards, Programming and sometimes Vocals) 2000–Present
- Emilio Pozzolini (Samplers, Programming) 2001–Present

=== Past members ===
- Michele Di Roberto (Drums) 2000-2005
- Giulio Corona (Programming) 2003-2008
- Sieva Diamantakos (Visuals, Videos) 2007–2014

== Discography ==
=== LPs ===
- Flares (Resonant Recordings 2005)
- Afraid To Dance (Resonant Recordings 2007)
- Flared Up - Remixes (Resonant Recordings 2008)
- Magnitogorsk - split LP with Absent Without Leave, 4 tracks each artist (Sound In Silence 2008)
- Dying In Time (n5MD, debruit&desilence, Sleeping Star, Isound Labels, Klik Records 2009)
- 2000-2010: The Golden Age Of Consumerism (n5MD 2011)
- Where Are You Now (n5MD 2015)
- You Ware Nowhere - Remixes (n5MD 2016)

=== EPs ===
- Kraken EP (Marsiglia Records 2002)
- Honved EP (Chat Blanc Records 2007)
- Anya: Sehnsucht EP (Chat Blanc Records 2008)
- Balding Generation (Losing Hair as We Lose Hope) (n5MD 2009)
- Afterglow EP w/ Millimetrik (Sang D'Encre Factory 2010)

=== Compilations ===
- Bias Illumination Over Diffracted Hearts (2003)
- Milk In My Cup (Green Fog 2004)
- Losing Today (Not On Label 2005)
- The Wire Tapper (Not On Label 2005)
- First Past and the Post (Not On Label 2005)
- Zenatron (De Vega De Ferrari 2006)
- These Waves (Sound In Silence Records 2006)
- Let's Talk About Muerte Pop (Muerte Pop 2007)
- I Am You Are Me - Millimetrik Remixes & Unreleased (Chat Blanc Records 2007)
- Chat Blanc 3rd Anniversary Compilation (Chat Blanc Records 2007)
- Festival Elektroni[k] Septième Édition (Not On Label 2007)
- Little Darla Has A Treat For You Vol. 25 - Endless Summer 2007-08 (Darla 2007)
- Lost Days, Open Skies And Streaming Tides - Manual Rarities & Remixes (Darla 2007)
- Treatment Effects (Chew-Z 2007)
- Merry6mas 2007 (Make Mine Music 2007)
- We Believe Vol. 2 (9.12 Records 2007)
- PostRockNotes.com Compilation (Not On Label 2008)
- Alternative Trippin Vol. 2 (Chaos Management - Emi Poland 2008)
- Northwest Passage's New Era - Millimetrik Album (Make Mine Music 2008)
- Tympanik Audio's Emerging Organisms vol. 4 (Tympanik Audio 2011)
- Dark Side of Pop (Cowshed Records 2012)
- AMBIELOGUE - Chapter I (Pinmusik 2013)

=== Remixes ===
- Felix da Housecat - ("We All Wanna Be Prince") (2009)
- Ladytron - ("Tomorrow") (2010) and (Velocifero (Remixed and Rare)") (2010)
