= Theology of Søren Kierkegaard =

Belief system of a philosopher

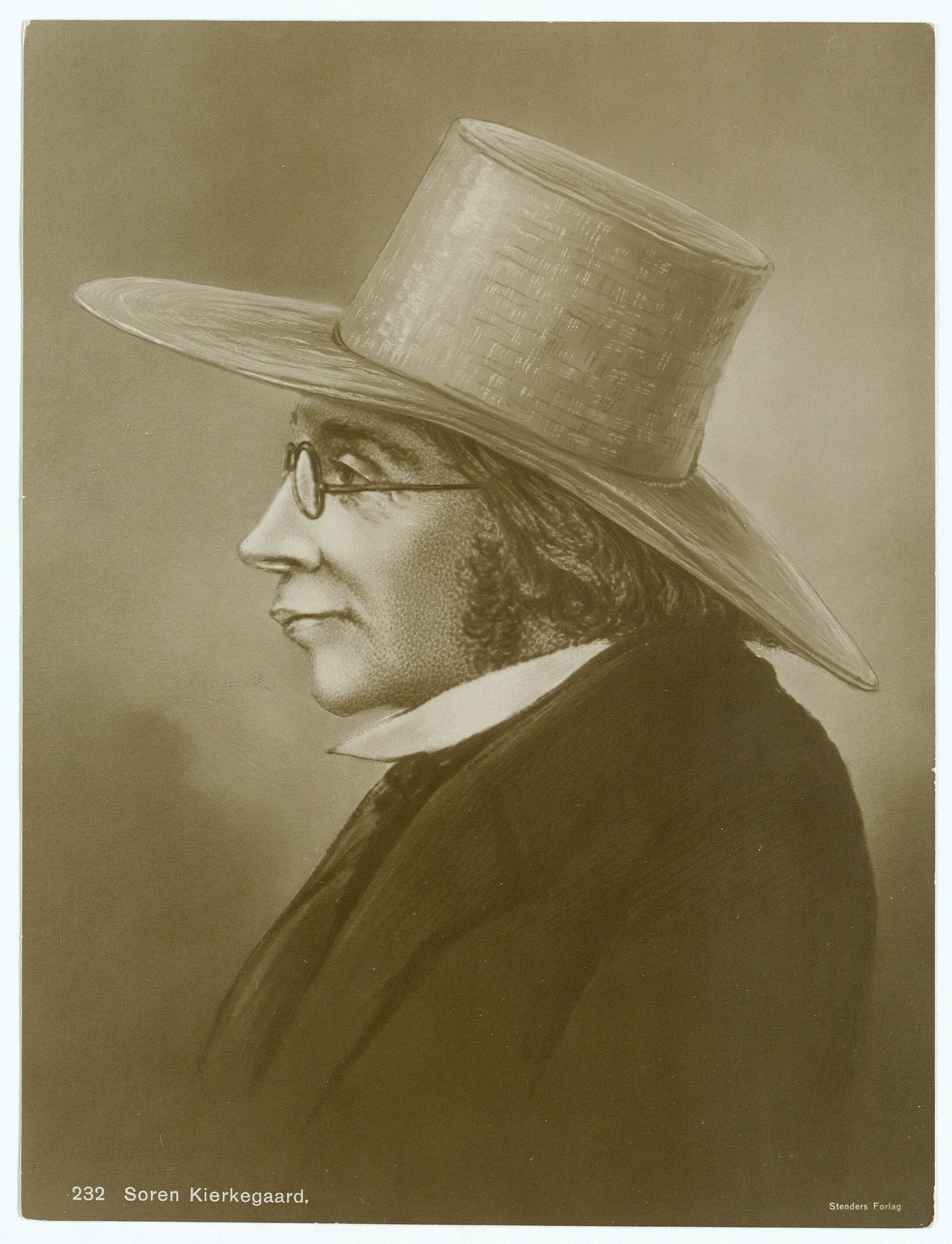
Søren Kierkegaard

Søren Kierkegaard's theology has been a major influence in the development of 20th century theology. Søren Kierkegaard (1813–1855) was a 19th century Danish philosopher who has been generally considered the "Father of Existentialism". During his later years (1848–1855), most of his writings shifted from being philosophical in nature to being religious.

Kierkegaard's theology focuses on the single individual in relation to an unprovable, yet known God. Much of his writings were a directed assault against all of Christendom, Christianity as a political and social entity. His target was the Danish State Church, which represented Christendom in Denmark. Christendom, in Kierkegaard's view, made individuals lazy in their religion. Many of the citizens were officially "Christians", without having any idea of what it meant to be a Christian. Kierkegaard attempted to awaken Christians to the need for unconditional religious commitment.

== Religious background ==
=== Kierkegaard ===
Søren Kierkegaard was born to a Lutheran Protestant family. His father, Michael Pederson Kierkegaard, was a Lutheran Pietist, but questioned how God could let him suffer so much. One day, he climbed a mount and cursed God. For this sin, Michael believed that a family curse was placed upon him, that none of his children would live a full life. And indeed, Kierkegaard's family suffered with early deaths of Søren's siblings, ranging from childbirth to the age of 25. Only Søren and his brother Peter survived past 25. His father died in 1838 but before his death, he asked Søren to become a pastor. Søren was deeply influenced by his father's religious experience and life, and felt obligated to fulfill his wish. In 1840, Søren was awarded his theology degree and although Søren was eligible to become a pastor, he decided to pursue a degree in philosophy instead.

=== Denmark and Europe ===
Kierkegaard accused Christian religious institutions of not being genuinely religious. Intellectual scholarship in Christianity was becoming more and more like Hegelianism, rather than Christianity. This made the scholars of religion and philosophy examine the Gospels from a supposedly higher objective standpoint in order to demonstrate how correct reasoning can reveal an objective truth. This was outrageous to Kierkegaard because this presupposed that an infinite God and his infinite wisdom could be grasped by finite human understanding. Kierkegaard believed that Christianity was not a doctrine to be taught, but rather a life to be lived. He considered that many Christians fell short of being real Christians:

There are among us some who claim to be Christian in the strictest sense of the word, to be that in contrast to the rest of us. I have been unable to associate myself with them. For one thing, I think that their lives do not meet the standard... For another, I am too far short of being a Christian to dare to associate myself with anyone who makes such a claim... I am ahead only in the poetic sense -- that is, I am more aware of what Christianity is, know how to describe it better.

— Søren Kierkegaard, For Self-Examination (1851)

== Kierkegaard's audience ==
Kierkegaard's primary religious audience was Christian readers, especially those who did not fully grasp what Christianity was all about. It was not his intention to convert non-Christians to Christianity, although much of Kierkegaard's religious writings do appeal to some non-Christian readers. For example, Martin Buber was a Jewish existentialist theologian who critiqued many of Kierkegaard's ideas.

== Themes in his theology ==
=== Faith ===
Faith is a hallmark of Kierkegaardian philosophical and religious thought. Two of his key ideas are based on faith: the leap of faith and the knight of faith.

=== Paradox ===
Briefly stated, a paradox is an apparently true statement or group of statements that seems to lead to a contradiction or to a situation that defies intuition. It is said to be resolved when we show that the contradiction is only apparent. Kierkegaard's story of Abraham in Fear and Trembling exhibits such a paradox. Abraham could not prove he had heard the voice of God, yet he believes, and risked his only son based on this belief. The paradox of Abraham is that the believer acts and risks much on less than complete knowledge (incomplete knowledge is not sufficient for faith for Kierkegaard; one must believe by virtue of the absurd, that is to say because something is a contradiction).

=== Despair and sin ===
According to Kierkegaard, the self is freedom. Not simply the freedom to choose, but the freedom to create choices for oneself. Therefore, human beings are fundamentally neither their thoughts nor their feelings but rather they are themselves. The self relates directly to itself and is subject to no one and everyone at the same time. In effect, when a person does not come to a full consciousness of himself or herself, then he or she is said to be in despair. Just like a physician might say that no one is completely healthy, it follows that human beings must despair at certain moments in their lives. To be in despair is to reflect upon the self. If someone does not engage in the art of despair, then he or she shall become stuck in a state of inertia with no effective progression or regression and that is the worst state of all.

== Selected religious works ==
- (1847) Edifying Discourses in Diverse Spirits
- (1847) Works of Love
- (1848) Christian Discourses
- (1848) The Book on Adler
- (1849) The Sickness Unto Death
- (1850) Training in Christianity
- (1851) For Self-Examination
- (1851) Judge for Yourselves!
