= Johan Frederik Schlegel =

Danish lawyer and civil servant (1817–1896)

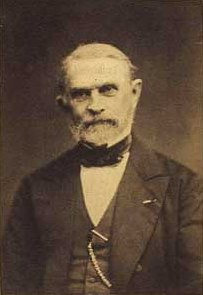
Johan Frederik Schlegel

Johan Frederik Schlegel (22 January 1817, Copenhagen – 8 June 1896, Copenhagen) was a Danish lawyer and civil servant. He was Governor-General of the Danish West Indies from 1855 to 1860, and Gehejmekonferensraad (Privy Counsellor) from 1860. In 1873, he was elected to the Copenhagen City Council.

He was married to Regine Olsen, who was formerly engaged to the philosopher and theologian Søren Kierkegaard.

Political offices
Preceded by Hans Ditmar Frederik Feddersen	Governor-General of the Danish West Indies; 1855–1860	Succeeded by Vilhelm Ludvig Birch
