= What Does It Feel Like? =

Single by Felix da Housecat featuring Miss Kittin and Melistar

from the album Kittenz and Thee Glitz
- Released: August 20, 2001
- Recorded: 2001
- Genre: House; electroclash
- Label: City Rockers
- Songwriter(s): Caroline Hervé; Felix Stallings
- Producer(s): Felix da Housecat

Felix da Housecat singles chronology
"Silver Screen Shower Scene" (2001)	"What Does It Feel Like?" (2001)	"Harlot" (2001)

Miss Kittin singles chronology
"Silver Screen Shower Scene'" (2001)	"What Does It Feel Like?" (2001)	"Je t'aime... moi non plus" (2001)

"What Does It Feel Like?" is the second single from Felix da Housecat's album Kittenz and Thee Glitz that features French musician Miss Kittin and Melistar.

== Critical reception ==
Paul Cooper of Pitchfork Media gave a negative review, saying, "Melistar and Miss Kittin join together in blandness."

== Track listing ==
- UK CD, Maxi single
1. "What Does It Feel Like? (Original)" - 2:37
2. "What Does It Feel Like? (Röyksopp Return To The Sun Remix)"- 7:12
3. "Control Freaq (No Ears Re-Edit)" - 7:37

== Charts ==
Chart (2002)	Peak Position
Belgian Dance Chart	20
UK Singles (OCC)	66

== Song usage ==
"What Does It Feel Like? (Röyksopp Return The Sun Mix)" was used on the mix album Fabric 11 by Swayzak.
