= A Bugged Out Mix (Felix da Housecat album) =

Studio album by Felix da Housecat
- Released: (United States) 9 September 2003
- Genre: House/Electroclash
- Length: 62:20
- Label: React
- Producer: Felix da Housecat

Felix da Housecat chronology
Rocketmann! (2002)	A Bugged Out Mix (2003)	Devin Dazzle & the Neon Fever (2004)

Professional ratings
Review scores
Source	Rating
AllMusic	3/5 stars
Muzik	4/5 stars

A Bugged Out Mix is a double album by American DJ / producer Felix da Housecat, released in 2003.

== Track listing ==
Disc One (Bugged Out)
No.	Title	Artist	Length
1.	"Caught Up"	Metro Area	4:21
2.	"Yalopa"	Julien Jabre	4:12
3.	"It's A Cold World"	Frankie Knuckles	3:56
4.	"2002"	Legowelt	2:08
5.	"Seventeen" (The Droyds Mix)	Ladytron	5:42
6.	"Uncompromised Awareness"	Charles Manier	3:15
7.	"Was Ist Musik?"	Justus Köhncke	3:35
8.	"Our Darkness"	Anne Clark	3:18
9.	"Bullet" (Ellen Allien Flow Mix)	Covenant	4:21
10.	"Bucci Bag" (Doria Dub Mix)	Andrea Doria	5:51
11.	"Coke, Sex, Drugs"	Electronica	4:07
12.	"Control Freaq"	Felix Da Housecat	3:40
13.	"From Disco to Disco"	Whirlpool Productions	5:38
14.	"Space Disco"	Carl Taylor	6:25

Disc Two (Bugged In)
No.	Title	Artist	Length
1.	"Night Drive"	Giorgio Moroder	3:51
2.	"Glad To Know You"	Chaz Jankel	3:36
3.	"Promises, Promises"	Naked Eyes	3:47
4.	"Walk The Night"	Skatt Bros	5:21
5.	"Beat Box"	Art Of Noise	8:31
6.	"Bostich"	Yello	4:35
7.	"Walking on Thin Ice" (Felix Da Housecat's Tribute Mix)	Yoko Ono	5:30
8.	"Personal Jesus" (François K Mix)	Depeche Mode	5:47
9.	"Devotion"	Ten City	6:47
10.	"Electrikboy"	Thee Maddkatt Courtship	3:51
