= Joakim Garff =

Danish theologian (born 1960)

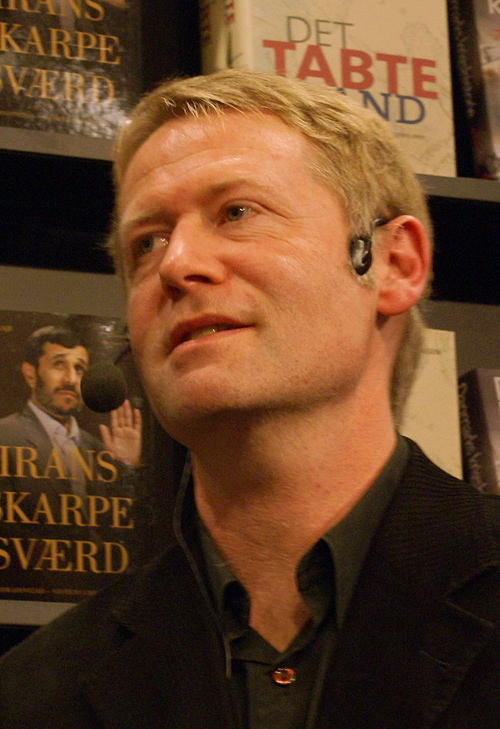
Joakim Garff

Joakim Garff (born 25 February 1960) is a Danish theologian and Søren Kierkegaard scholar at Søren Kierkegaard Research Center at the University of Copenhagen. He has written several books on Kierkegaard including Soren Kierkegaard: A Biography (2000).
