= Playboy: The Mansion Soundtrack =

Soundtrack album by Felix da Housecat
- Released: (United States) 11 January 2005
- Genre: House
- Length: 79:26
- Label: Koch Records
- Producer: Felix da Housecat

Professional ratings
Review scores
Source	Rating
Allmusic	2.5/5 stars

Playboy: The Mansion Soundtrack is a soundtrack album by American DJ / producer Felix da Housecat, released in 2005.

It was released as the soundtrack to the 2005 business simulation video game Playboy: The Mansion, but it also contains several tracks not present in the game, making some view it as a "promotional tie-in".

== Track listing ==
No.	Title	Artist	Length
1.	"Fly Away Love"	Armand Van Helden	5:06
2.	"Wickeddy Beats"	DJ Sneak	4:32
3.	"Swanky"	Steve Porter	7:33
4.	"Shakedown"	High Caliber	4:24
5.	"The Groove"	Mark Knight	6:26
6.	"Strong"	Kaskade	6:40
7.	"Corrective Tones" (Matthew Dekay Remix)	Michael Burns	9:34
8.	"So Hot"	Miles Maeda	9:53
9.	"Your Touch"	Mazi & Lori	8:04
10.	"Mocha Disko"	Johnny Fiasco	6:48
11.	"Jungle Kisses" (10" Raw Sax Dub)	Ray Roc Presents	8:03
12.	"Do Me What I Do"	Felix Da Housecat	2:23
Total length:			79:26
