= Kittenz and Thee Glitz =

Studio album by Felix Da Housecat
- Released: July 9, 2001
- Recorded: 1999–2001
- Genre: House, electroclash, electro house
- Length: 52:31
- Label: City Rockers
- Producer: Felix da Housecat, Dave The Hustler, Tommie Sunshine, Junior Sanchez, Junior Jack

Felix Da Housecat chronology
I Know Electrikboy (2000)	Kittenz and Thee Glitz (2001)	Excursions (2002)

Singles from Kittenz and Thee Glitz
- 1. "Silver Screen Shower Scene" Released: May 1, 2001; 2. "What Does It Feel Like?" Released: 2001; 3. "Madame Hollywood" Released: 2002

Kittenz and Thee Glitz is a 2001 album by American DJ / producer Felix da Housecat. It was released in the U.S. on Emperor Norton in 2002 after being critically acclaimed in the UK. The album was created alongside Tommie Sunshine, Miss Kittin, Dave The Hustler, Harrison Crump, Junior Sanchez, Junior Jack and Melistar. It features the single "Silver Screen Shower Scene" and the vocals of French artist Miss Kittin.

The album mixes early 80s electronic music, of the kind released by ZE Records artist Cristina, along with house music.

It was listed by noted music journalist Paul Morley in his book Words and Music, as one of his 100 albums to hear "if you think Radiohead's Kid A is weird".

The album's first single, "Silver Screen Shower Scene" contains a sample of the Ben Liebrand remix of The Flirts single "Passion", and "Harlot" contains an unaccredited sample of the drum pattern from The Human League track, "The Sound of the Crowd". "Glitz Rock" contains a Kano sample.

"Silver Screen Shower Scene" and "Sequel2Sub" were also featured in the soundtrack to Midnight Club II for the Xbox, PC, and PlayStation 2. "Silver Screen Shower Scene" is also featured in SSX 3 for the Xbox, PlayStation 2, and GameCube.

"Magic Fly" is a cover version of the 1977 hit by Space.

== Critical reception ==
Professional ratings
Aggregate scores
Source	Rating
Metacritic	78/100
Review scores
Source	Rating
AllMusic	4/5 stars
Alternative Press	7/10
Blender	4/5 stars
The Guardian	4/5 stars
Muzik	5/5
NME	8/10
Pitchfork	4.2/10
Rolling Stone	4/5 stars
Spin	7/10
Uncut	4/5 stars

Kittenz and Thee Glitz received generally favorable reviews. The album holds a score of 78 out of 100 on the review aggregator website Metacritic.

Resident Advisor placed Kittenz and Thee Glitz at number 73 on their list of the top 100 albums of the 2000s.

== Track listing ==
1. "Harlot (Intro)" (Stallings) – 5:19
2. "Walk With Me" (Stallings) – 4:15
3. "Voicemail" (Felix da Housecat, Miss Kittin) – 0:47
4. "Madame Hollywood" (Hervé, Stallings) – 2:51
5. "Silver Screen Shower Scene" (Jenefsky, Lorello, Stallings) – 4:40
6. "Control Freaq" (Stallings) – 5:11
7. "What Does It Feel Like?" (Stallings) – 2:36
8. "Happy Hour" (Jenefsky, Lorello, Stallings) – 5:02
9. "Thee Enter View" – 1:14
10. "Glitz Rock" (Stallings) – 4:00
11. "Analog City" (Stallings) – 1:18
12. "Pray for a Star" (Crump, Stallings) – 3:54
13. "Sequel2Sub" (Stallings) – 3:50
14. "Magic Fly" (Marouani) – 3:00
15. "She Lives" (Stallings) – 3:03
16. "Runaway Dreamer" (Crump, Stallings) – 3:21
