= Felix da Housecat =

American DJ and record producer

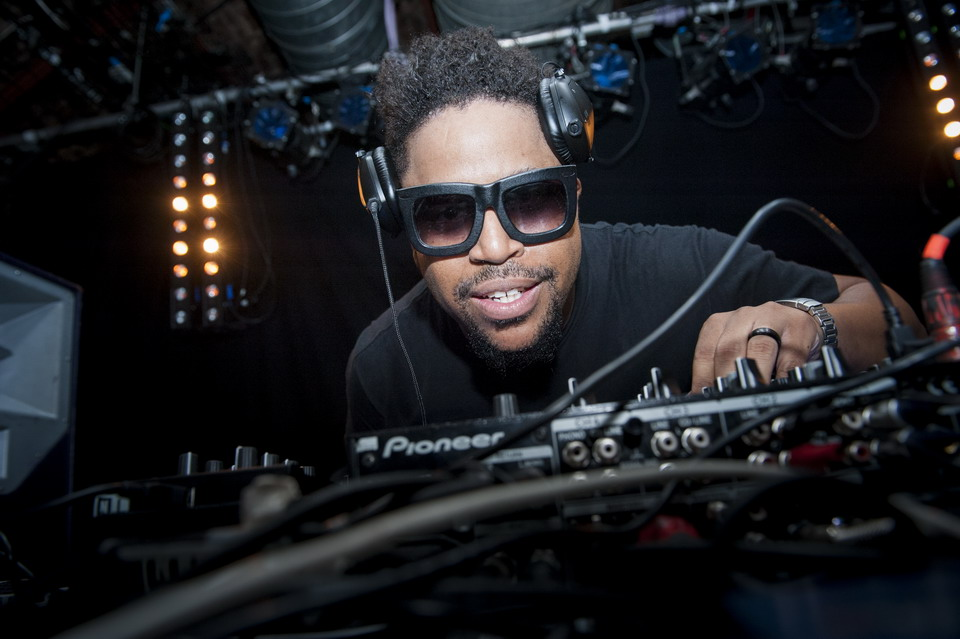
- Felix da Housecat performing in 2013

Background information
- Born: Felix Stallings, Jr. August 25, 1971 (age 55); Chicago, Illinois, U.S.
- Genres: Electronic, house, techno, big beat, alternative dance, electroclash, synthpop
- Occupations: DJ, producer
- Labels: Emperor Norton, Rykodisc, Rude Photo, Mishu Records

Felix Stallings Jr. (born August 25, 1971), known professionally as Felix da Housecat, is an American DJ and record producer, mostly known for house music and electroclash. Felix is regarded as a member of the second wave of Chicago house.

== Musical career ==
=== Early life ===
Stallings developed an interest in the emergent Chicago house music scene at a young age. While a student at Rich East High School in Park Forest, Illinois in the mid-1980s, a chance introduction to acid house pioneer DJ Pierre gave the then 15-year-old Stallings his break, and under the patronage and guidance of Pierre, he released his first single, "Phantasy Girl," in 1987.

Also in 1987, Felix went to Alabama State University to study media and communication. There he studied different musicians of the era, including Prince, A Tribe Called Quest, and Gang Starr, as well as developing an interest in hip hop and R&B tracks.

=== 1990s ===
After graduating, he released "Thee Dawn" on Guerilla Records. He became popular in Europe, and in the following year, "By Dawn's Early Light" and "Thee Industry Made Me Do It" followed. A further single, "In The Dark We Live (Thee Lite)", appeared under his pseudonym, Aphrohead. Originally released on the UK label, Bush, "In The DaAlbum", followed in 1998. In 1999, he released "In The Dark We Live".

Shortly afterwards, Stallings formed Radikal Fear Records. It released material from Mike Dunn, DJ Sneak, and Armando as well as Felix himself. During 1995, he released his debut album Alone in the Dark (as Thee Maddkatt Courtship) on Deep Distraxion, followed by the Radikal Fear compilation album, The Chicago All Stars and a remix album entitled Clashbackk Compilation Mix. The album I Know Electrikboy was never officially released in either the US or UK, although promotional copies are in circulation.

=== 2000s ===
In 2001, Kittenz and Thee Glitz, written and produced alongside Tommie Sunshine, Miss Kittin, Dave The Hustler, Harrison Crump, Junior Sanchez, Junior Jack and Melistar, was released which gained Felix mainstream exposure. At the end of that year, Felix won Best Album at the now-defunct Muzik Awards. The ensuing fame brought Felix remix work for Madonna, Britney Spears and Kylie Minogue. The proper follow-up, Devin Dazzle & the Neon Fever, was released in 2004, though Felix released a pair of mix albums, 2002's Excursions and 2003's A Bugged Out Mix, in between.

Felix also collaborated with P Diddy on the pair's "Jack U" single. The pair remain friends, with Diddy performing alongside Felix at Space in Ibiza in 2005, and Felix performing at Diddy's after-party for The Main Event at the Winter Music Conference.

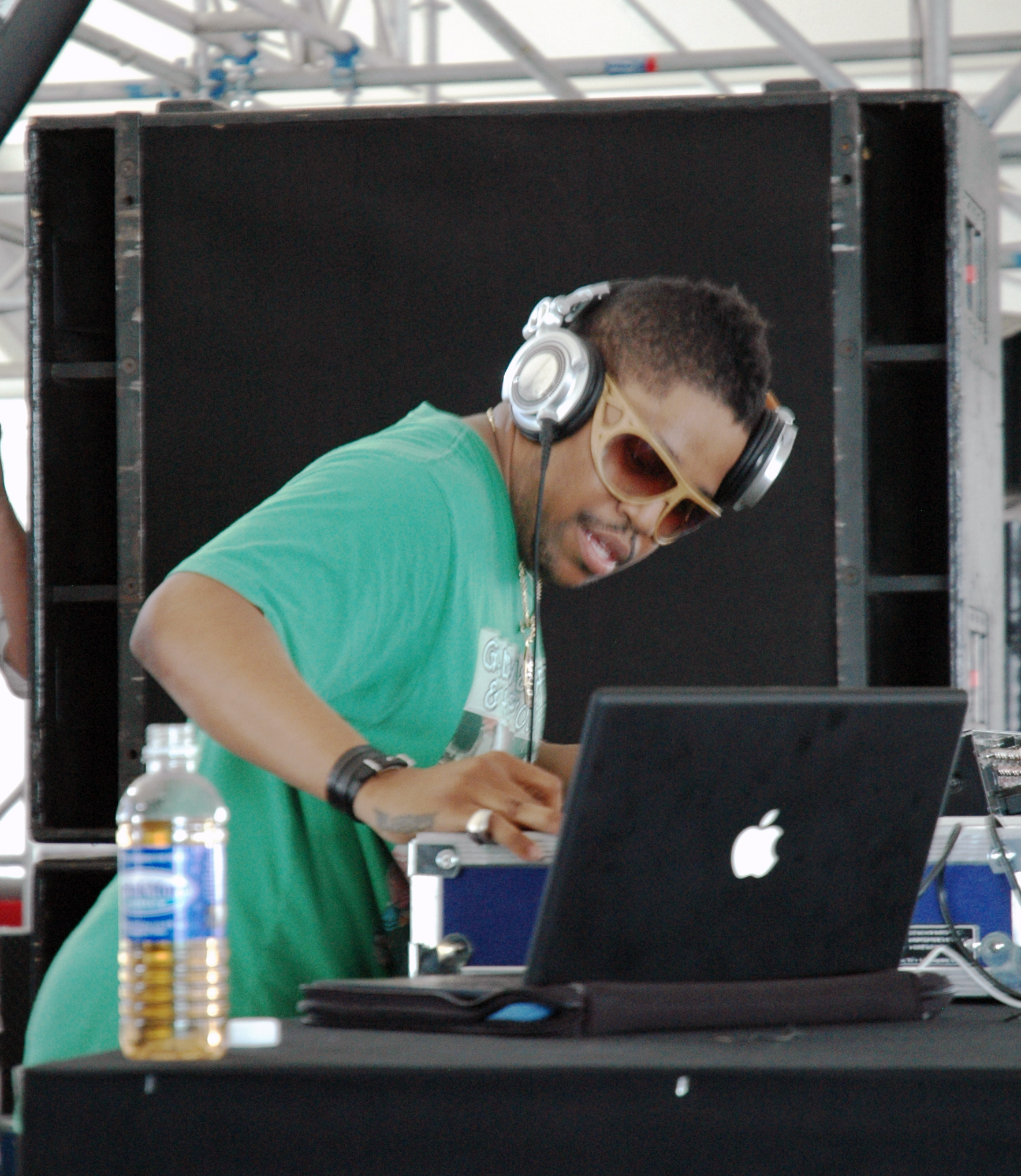
2007 in Baltimore

Various remixes of "Silver Screen Shower Scene" were used in video games such as Midnight Club 2, and SSX 3. The Soulwax Remix of his song "Rocket Ride" was featured in the game Need for Speed: Underground 2. "Everyone Is Someone in LA" was featured in Tony Hawk's American Wasteland. His songs have also featured in television programs such as The Sopranos and "Silver Screen Shower Scene" featured in the party scene in Shane Black's 2005 film, Kiss Kiss Bang Bang.

Felix's album, Virgo Blaktro and the Movie Disco, was released on October 2, 2007, in the US on Nettwerk Records. Production was overseen by Dallas Austin.

"Future Calls The Dawn" was released on July 9, 2007, on Wall of Sound/PIAS with "Sweetfrosti" featured as the B-side. "Sweetfrosti" contained a sample of Devo's "Snowball", originally released in 1981.

"Like Something 4 Porno!" was released as the album's lead single on September 24, 2007, with remixes from Kris Menace, Teenage Bad Girl and Armand Van Helden, while a third single, "Radio", was released digitally in April 2008. Since then, Felix has released his first Global Underground compilation, for the Newcastle-upon-Tyne compilation and club label. Felix also teamed up with Kris Menace to release "Artificial" in June 2008.

In 2009, Felix released He Was King, via Nettwerk Records.

== Discography ==
=== Studio albums ===
Year	Title	Chart peaks			
Year	Title	US 200	US Dance	US Indie	UK
1995	Metropolis Present Day? Thee Album!	—	—	—	—
1999	I Know Electrikboy (as Maddkatt Courtship III)	—	—	—	—
2001	Kittenz and Thee Glitz	—	—	—	—
2002	Rocketmann! (as Rocketmann!)	—	—	—	—
2004	Devin Dazzle & the Neon Fever	—	8	41	97
2007	Virgo Blaktro and the Movie Disco	—	—	—	—
2009	He Was King	—	—	—	—
2011	Son of Analogue	—	—	—	—
2013	Sinner Winner / Give Me Body	—	—	—	—
2013	I Just Want to Be a Lesbian	—	—	—	—
2015	Narrative of Thee Blast Illusion	—	—	—	—
"—" denotes a recording that did not chart or was not released.

=== Mix albums ===
Year	Title	Chart peaks		
Year	Title	Top 200	US Dance	US Indie
1997	Clashbackk Compilation Mix	—	—	—
1997	Transmissions, Vol. 2	—	—	—
2002	Excursions	—	—	—
2003	A Bugged Out Mix	—	19	—
2005	Playboy: The Mansion Soundtrack	—	—	—
2005	Past, Present and Future House and Electro	—	—	—
2008	Global Underground 034: Milan	—	—	—
2012	Various Artists - Pete Tong & Felix Da Housecat - All Gone Ibiza 11	—	—	—
"—" denotes a recording that did not chart or was not released.

=== Singles ===
Year	Title	Chart peaks				Album
Year	Title	US Dance	US Sales	CAN	UK	Album
2001	"Silver Screen Shower Scene"	–	–	–	39	Kittenz and Thee Glitz
2001	"Harlot"	–	–	–	79	Kittenz and Thee Glitz
2001	"What Does It Feel Like?"	–	–	–	66	Kittenz and Thee Glitz
2002	"Madame Hollywood"	–	11	19	–	Kittenz and Thee Glitz
2003	"Cyberwhore"	–	–	–	103	
2004	"Watching Cars Go By"	39	6	–	49	Devin Dazzle & the Neon Fever
2005	"Ready 2 Wear"	–	–	–	62	Devin Dazzle & the Neon Fever
2005	"Rocket Ride"	–	24	–	55	Devin Dazzle & the Neon Fever
2008	"Like Something 4 Porno!"	13	–	–	–	Virgo Blaktro and the Movie Disco
2009	"We All Wanna Be Prince"	26	–	–	–	He Was King
2013	"Sinner Winner"	–	–	–	–	Sinner Winner / Give Me Body
2013	"I Just Want to Be a Lesbian"	–	–	–	–	Non-album singles
2018	"Marshall & Pierre" (with Kristin Velvet)	–	–	–	–	Non-album singles
2019	"Cats Love Velvet III"	–	–	–	–	Non-album singles
2019	"Thee Trk!" (with Chris Trucher)	–	–	–	–	Non-album singles
2020	"Lonely2Live" (with Jamie Principle)	–	–	–	–	Non-album singles
2020	"Chicago Love" (with Chris Trucher)	–	–	–	–	Non-album singles
2020	"Cats Love Velvet IV" (with Kristin Velvet)	–	–	–	–	Non-album singles
2021	"I Discover" (with Chris Trucher)	–	–	–	–	Non-album singles
2022	"Silver Screen (Shower Screen)" (with David Guetta and Miss Kittin)	–	–	–	–	Non-album singles
"—" denotes a single that did not chart or was not released.

=== Remixes ===
- Passion Pit – "Little Secrets (Felix Da Housecat Pink Enemy Remix)" (2009)
- Britney Spears – "Toxic (Felix Da Housecat's Club Mix)" (2004)
- Buy Now! – "For Sale (Felix Da Housecat Remix)" (2007)
- Ladytron – "Playgirl (Felix Da Housecat Glitz Club Mix)" (2001)
- The Chemical Brothers – "Get Yourself High (Felix Da Housecat's Chemical Meltdown Mix)" (2003)
- The Disco Boys – "Born to Be Alive (Felix Da Housecat's Chicago Tracky Glitz Remix)" (2001)
- Garbage – "Androgyny (Thee Glitz mix)" & "Androgyny (Thee Drum Drum mix)" (2001)
- Gwen Stefani – "What You Waiting For? (The Rude Ho Mix by Felix Da Housecat)" (2005)
- Brandy – "What About Us?" (Felix Da Housecat's Glitz Mix) (2002)
- Holly Valance – "State of Mind (Felix Da Housecat's Dub)" (2003)
- Madonna – "American Life (Felix Da Housecat's Devin Dazzle Club Mix)" (2003)
- Madonna – "Die Another Day (Thee RetroLectro Mix)" (2003)
- Miike Snow – "Silvia (Felix Da Housecat Remix)" (2010)
- Mylène Farmer – "Je t'aime mélancolie (Felix Da Housecat Remix)" (2003)
- Mylo – "Drop the Pressure (Felix Da Housecat Remix)" (2004)
- Nina Simone – "Sinnerman (Felix Da Housecat's Heavenly House Mix)" (2003)
- Pet Shop Boys – "London (Thee Radikal Blaklight Edit)" (2003)
- Pet Shop Boys – "I Don't Know What You Want But I Can't Give It Anymore (Thee 2 Black Ninja Mix) (1999)
- New Order – "Here To Stay (Felix Da Housecat Extended Glitz mix)" (2002)
- Paola & Chiara – "Vanity & Pride (Felix Da Housecat Club Mix)" (2008)
- Uffie – "Pop the Glock (Felix Da Housecat's Pink Enemy Remix)" (2009)
- Kylie Minogue – "Where Is The Feeling? (Da Klub Feelin Mix)" (1995)
- Diana Ross – "Take Me Higher (I Feel Radical Mix)" (1995)
- RAC – "Hollywood Featuring Penguin Prison (Felix Da Housecat Remix)" (2012)
- Ali Love – "Another (Felix Da Housecat Remix)" (2013)
- Pompeya – "Y.A.H.T.B.M.F. (Felix Da Housecat Heavenly House Mix)" (2014)
- Born Dirty and Diplo – "Samba Sujo (Felix Da Housecat and Dave The Hustler Remix)" (2019)

== DJ Magazine top 100 DJs ==
Year	Position	Notes	Ref.
2003	77	New entry	
2004	73	Up 4	
2005	87	Down 14	
2006	142	Exit (down 55)	
Hiatus
2008	142	Out	
