= Justice discography =

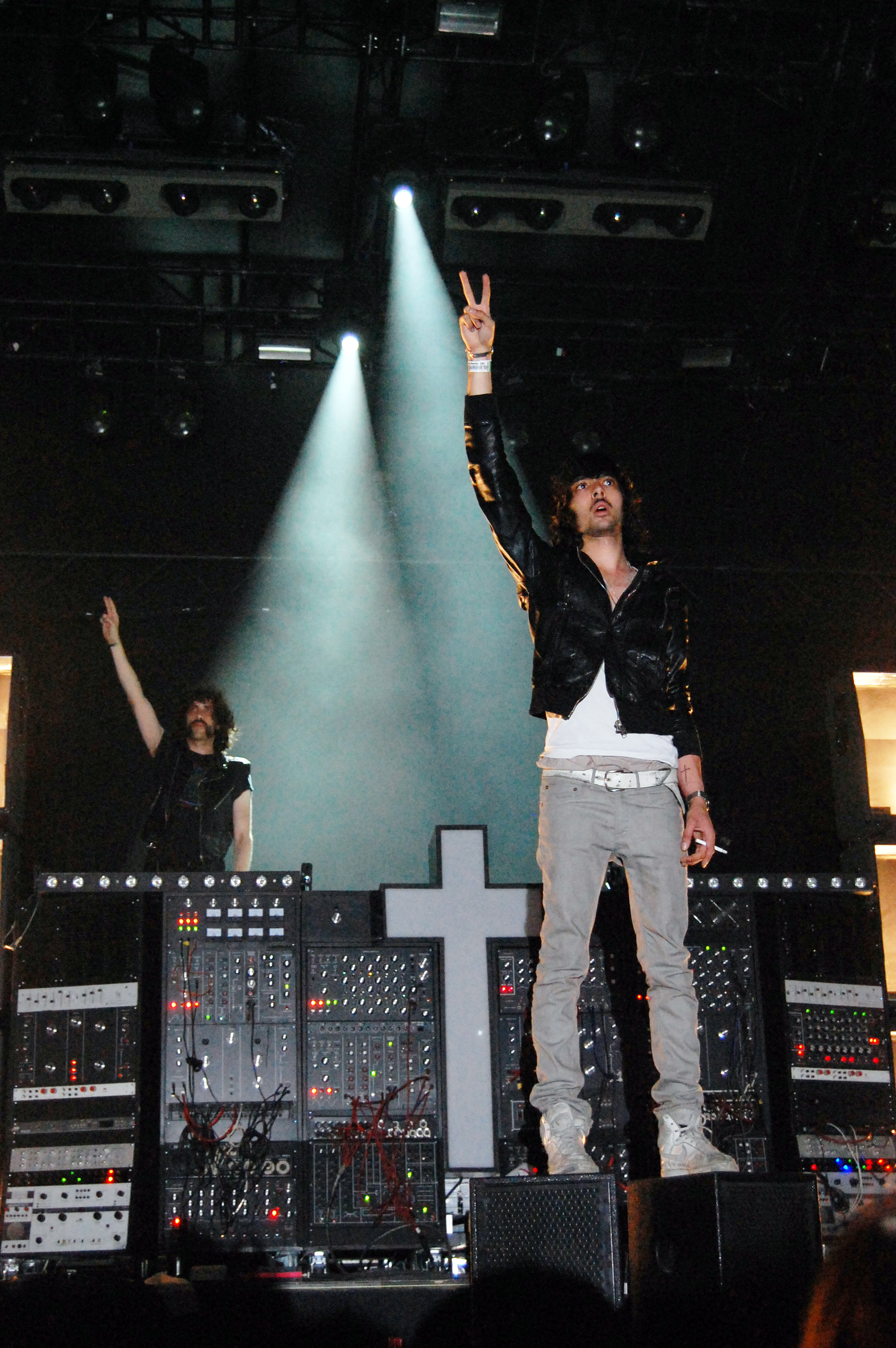
- Justice at Rock Werchter, 2008
- Studio albums: 4
- Extended plays: 1
- Live albums: 2
- Remix albums: 1
- Singles: 31
- Music videos: 21

The following is a comprehensive discography of French electronic music duo Justice. Their discography comprises four studio albums, two live albums, and thirty-one singles, among others.

== Albums ==
=== Studio albums ===
List of studio albums, with selected details, peak chart positions and certifications
Title	Details	Peak chart positions										Certifications (thresholds)
Title	Details	FRA	AUS	AUT	BEL	CAN	GER	NL	SWI	UK	US	Certifications (thresholds)
Cross	Released: 11 June 2007; Label: Because Music; Format: CD, vinyl, digital download	11	61	71	29	—	56	77	36	49	—	BPI: Gold
Audio, Video, Disco	Released: 24 October 2011; Label: Because Music; Format: CD, vinyl, digital download	5	18	49	10	22	67	97	15	35	37	
Woman	Released: 18 November 2016; Label: Because Music; Format: CD, vinyl, digital download	17	66	44	20	72	70	51	16	47	154	
Hyperdrama	Released: 26 April 2024; Label: Ed Banger; Format: CD, vinyl, digital download	2	52	10	2	91	14	38	4	34	96	
"—" denotes a recording that did not chart or was not released in that territory.

=== Live albums ===
List of live albums, with selected details and peak chart positions
Title	Details	Peak chart positions								
Title	Details	FRA	BEL (FL)	BEL (WA)	NL	SWI	UK DL	UK Dance	UK Indie	US Dance
A Cross the Universe	Released: 24 November 2008; Label: Atlantic; Format: CD, vinyl, digital download, DVD	34	39	42	94	—	33	3	—	8
Access All Arenas	Released: 6 May 2013; Label: Ed Banger; Format: CD, vinyl, digital download	12	146	54	—	86	— (Note: Access All Arenas did not enter the UK Album Downloads Chart but peaked at number 39 on the UK Record Store Chart.)	30	43	21
"—" denotes a recording that did not chart or was not released in that territory.

=== Remix albums ===
List of remix albums, with selected details and peak chart positions
Title	Details	Peak chart positions									
Title	Details	FRA	AUT	BEL (FL)	BEL (WA)	GER	NL	SCO	SWI	UK Sales	US Dance
Woman Worldwide	Released: 24 August 2018; Label: Genesis, Ed Banger, Because; Format: CD, vinyl, digital download	10	38	24	37	48	169	33	29	37	22

=== Soundtrack albums ===
Title	Details
Grand Theft Auto VI: Original Score	Scheduled: 11 December 2026; Label: Ed Banger, Because Music; Format: CD, vinyl, digital download

== Extended plays ==
Title	Details	Peak chart positions	
Title	Details	BEL (WA)	UK Phys.
Planisphère	Released: 8 July 2008; Label: Ed Banger, Because Music; Format: Vinyl, digital download	76	15

== Singles ==
List of singles, with selected peak chart positions
Title	Year	Peak chart positions										Certifications (thresholds)	Album
Title	Year	FRA	BEL (FL)	BEL (WA)	CAN	FIN	JPN	SPA	SWI	UK	US	Certifications (thresholds)	Album
"Never Be Alone" (vs. Simian)	2004	—	—	—	—	—	—	—	—	—	—		Non-album single
"Waters of Nazareth"	2005	88	—	—	—	—	—	—	—	— (Note: "Waters of Nazareth" did not enter the UK Singles Chart but peaked at number 79 on the UK Physical Singles Chart.)	— (Note: "Waters of Nazareth" did not enter the Billboard Hot 100, but peaked at number 20 on the Hot Singles Sales chart.)		Cross
"We Are Your Friends" (vs. Simian)	2006	—	—	—	—	—	—	—	—	20	—		Non-album single
"D.A.N.C.E."	2007	11	— (Note: "D.A.N.C.E." did not enter the Flanders Ultratop Top 50 but peaked at number three on the Flanders Ultratip Bubbling Under chart.)	— (Note: "D.A.N.C.E." did not enter the Wallonie Ultratop Top 50 but peaked at number three on the Wallonie Ultratip Bubbling Under chart.)	—	20	79	—	49	48	— (Note: "D.A.N.C.E." did not enter the Billboard Hot 100, but peaked at number 3 on the Bubbling Under Hot 100 chart.)	BPI: Silver; RIAA: Gold	Cross
"Phantom Pt. II"	2007	—	—	—	—	—	—	—	—	— (Note: "Phantom Pt. II" did not enter the UK Singles Chart but peaked at number 69 on the UK Physical Singles Chart.)	—		Cross
"DVNO"	2008	94	— (Note: "DVNO" did not enter the Flanders Ultratop Top 50 but peaked at number 23 on the Flanders Ultratip Bubbling Under chart.)	—	—	—	—	—	—	118	—		Cross
"Tthhee Ppaarrttyy"	2009	—	—	—	—	—	—	—	—	—	—		Cross
"Civilization"	2011	5	— (Note: "Civilization" did not enter the Flanders Ultratop Top 50 but peaked at number seven on the Flanders Ultratip Bubbling Under chart.)	29	83	—	—	30	—	53	— (Note: "Civilization" did not enter the Billboard Hot 100, but peaked at number 16 on the Hot Singles Sales chart.)		Audio, Video, Disco
"Audio, Video, Disco"	2011	—	— (Note: "Audio, Video, Disco" did not enter the Flanders Ultratop Top 50 but peaked at number 33 on the Flanders Ultratip Bubbling Under chart.)	— (Note: "Audio, Video, Disco" did not enter the Wallonie Ultratop Top 50 but peaked at number 28 on the Wallonie Ultratip Bubbling Under chart.)	—	—	41	—	—	— (Note: "Audio, Video, Disco" did not enter the UK Singles Chart but peaked at number 29 on the UK Physical Singles Chart.)	— (Note: "Audio, Video, Disco" did not enter the Billboard Hot 100, but peaked at number two on the Hot Singles Sales chart.)		Audio, Video, Disco
"On'n'On"	2012	75	—	— (Note: "On'n'On" did not enter the Wallonie Ultratop Top 50 but peaked at number 18 on the Wallonie Ultratip Bubbling Under chart.)	—	—	—	—	—	— (Note: "On'n'On" did not enter the UK Singles Chart but peaked at number 16 on the UK Physical Singles Chart.)	— (Note: "On'n'On" did not enter the Billboard Hot 100, but peaked at number four on the Hot Singles Sales chart.)		Audio, Video, Disco
"New Lands"	2012	128	—	—	—	—	—	—	—	— (Note: "New Lands" did not enter the UK Singles Chart but peaked at number 37 on the UK Physical Singles Chart.)	— (Note: "New Lands" did not enter the Billboard Hot 100, but peaked at number 12 on the Hot Singles Sales chart.)		Audio, Video, Disco
"Helix"	2013	86	— (Note: "Helix" did not enter the Flanders Ultratop Top 50 but peaked at number 60 on the Flanders Ultratip Bubbling Under chart.)	—	—	—	—	—	—	— (Note: "Helix" did not enter the UK Singles Chart but peaked at number 41 on the UK Physical Singles Chart.)	— (Note: "Helix" did not enter the Billboard Hot 100, but peaked at number 16 on the Hot Singles Sales chart.)		Audio, Video, Disco
"Safe and Sound"	2016	48	— (Note: "Safe and Sound" did not enter the Flanders Ultratop Top 50 but peaked at number 12 on the Flanders Ultratip Bubbling Under chart.)	— (Note: "Safe and Sound" did not enter the Wallonie Ultratop Top 50 but peaked at number 29 on the Wallonie Ultratip Bubbling Under chart.)	—	—	—	—	—	—	—		Woman
"Randy"	2016	102	— (Note: "Randy" did not enter the Flanders Ultratop Top 50 but peaked at number 39 on the Flanders Ultratip Bubbling Under chart.)	— (Note: "Randy" did not enter the Wallonie Ultratop Top 50 but peaked at number 35 on the Wallonie Ultratip Bubbling Under chart.)	—	—	—	—	—	—	—		Woman
"Alakazam !"	2016	90	—	—	—	—	—	—	—	—	—		Woman
"Fire"	2016	—	— (Note: "Fire" did not enter the Flanders Ultratop Top 50 but charted as an "extra tip" on the Flanders Ultratip Bubbling Under chart.)	—	—	—	—	—	—	—	—		Woman
"Pleasure" (Live)	2017	—	—	—	—	—	—	—	—	—	—		Non-album single
"Stop" (WWW)	2018	—	—	—	—	—	—	—	—	—	—		Woman Worldwide
"D.A.N.C.E. x Fire x Safe & Sound (WWW)"	2018	—	—	—	—	—	—	—	—	—	—		Woman Worldwide
"Randy (WWW)"	2018	—	—	—	—	—	—	—	—	—	—		Woman Worldwide
"Chorus (WWW)"	2018	—	—	—	—	—	—	—	—	—	—		Woman Worldwide
"Love S.O.S. (WWW)"	2018	—	—	—	—	—	—	—	—	—	—		Woman Worldwide
"One Night/All Night" (featuring Tame Impala)	2024	—	—	—	—	—	— (Note: "One Night/All Night" did not enter the Billboard Japan Hot 100 chart, but peaked at number 14 on the Billboard Japan Hot Overseas chart.)	—	—	—	—		Hyperdrama
"Generator"	2024	—	—	—	—	—	—	—	—	—	—		Hyperdrama
"Incognito"	2024	—	—	—	—	—	—	—	—	—	—		Hyperdrama
"Saturnine" (featuring Miguel)	2024	—	—	—	—	—	—	—	—	—	—		Hyperdrama
"Neverender" (featuring Tame Impala)	2024	157	—	—	—	—	—	—	—	— (Note: "Neverender" did not enter the UK Singles Chart, but peaked at number 33 on the UK Physical Singles Chart.)	—	SNEP: Gold; RIAA: Gold	Hyperdrama
"Afterimage" (featuring Rimon)	2025	—	—	—	—	—	—	—	—	—	—		Hyperdrama
"What You Want" (with Angèle)	2026	19	32	1	—	—	—	—	99	—	—	SNEP: Platinum; BRMA: Gold	Instinct
"Flower in a Hurricane" (with Tame Impala, SZA and King Gizzard & the Lizard Wizard)	2026	50	28	—	42	—	—	—	5	9	62		Grand Theft Auto VI: The Album and Grand Theft Auto VI: Original Score
"Pusher" (with Gesaffelstein)	2026	—	—	—	—	—	—	—	—	—	—		Grand Theft Auto VI: Original Score
"—" denotes a recording that did not chart or was not released in that territory.

== Other charted songs ==
List of other charted songs, with selected peak chart positions
Title	Year	Peak chart positions										Certifications (thresholds)	Album
Title	Year	FRA	AUS	CAN	ITA	LTU	SWE	POR	UK Sales	US	WW	Certifications (thresholds)	Album
"Wake Me Up" (with The Weeknd)	2025	28	61	28	57	25	52	47	74	45	31	MC: Gold	Hurry Up Tomorrow

== Music videos ==
Title	Year	Director(s)	Album
"We Are Your Friends" (vs. Simian)	2006	Rozan & Schmeltz	—N/a
"D.A.N.C.E."	2007	Jonas & François	Cross
"DVNO"	2008	So Me, Machine Mole	Cross
"Stress"	2008	Romain Gavras	Cross
"Phantom Pt. II"	2008	Romain Gavras	Cross
"Let Love Rule" (Lenny Kravitz and Justice)	2009	Keith Schofield	—N/a
"Civilization"	2011	Édouard Salier	Audio Video Disco
"Audio, Video, Disco"	2011	So Me	Audio Video Disco
"On'n'On"	2012	Alexandre Courtes	Audio Video Disco
"New Lands"	2012	CANADA	Audio Video Disco
"Randy"	2016	Thomas Jumin	Woman
"Alakazam !"	2016	Ugo Mangin	Woman
"Fire"	2016	Pascal Teixeira	Woman
"Pleasure (Live)"	2017	Alexandre Courtès	—N/a
"Stop"	2018	Mrzyk & Moriceau	Woman
"Love S.O.S"	2018	Edouard Salier	Woman Worldwide
"Heavy Metal"	2018	Filip Nilsson	Woman Worldwide
"One Night/All Night" (featuring Tame Impala)	2024	Anton Tammi	Hyperdrama
"Generator"	2024	Léa Ceheivi	Hyperdrama
"Neverender" (featuring Tame Impala)	2024	Massanobu Hiraoka, Kota Iguchi	Hyperdrama
"Afterimage" (featuring Rimon)	2025	Pascal Teixeira	Hyperdrama

== Other credits ==
=== Remixes ===
Year	Artist	Title
2003	Scenario Rock	"Skitzo Dancer"
2003	Vicarious Bliss	"Theme from Vicarious Bliss"
2004	N*E*R*D	"She Wants to Move"
2005	Britney Spears (featuring Madonna)	"Me Against the Music"
2005	Daft Punk	"Human After All" ("Guy-Man After All" Justice Remix)
2005	Death from Above 1979	"Blood on Our Hands"
2005	Fatboy Slim	"Don't Let the Man Get You Down"
2005	Mystery Jets	"You Can't Fool Me Dennis"
2005	Soulwax	"NY Excuse"
2006	Franz Ferdinand	"The Fallen" (Ruined by Justice)
2006	Justice	"Waters of Nazareth"
2006	Mr. Oizo	"Nazis"
2007	Justice	"D.A.N.C.E."
2007	Justin Timberlake	"LoveStoned"
2007	Klaxons	"As Above, So Below"
2007	ZZT	"Lower State of Consciousness"
2008	Justice	"DVNO"
2008	Justice	"Stress" (Auto Remix)
2008	MGMT	"Electric Feel"
2009	Lenny Kravitz	"Let Love Rule"
2009	U2	"Get on Your Boots"
2013	Boys Noize	"Ich R U"
2013	Justice	"Brianvision" (MMXIII Remix)
2019	Frank Ocean	"Dear April"
2024	Justice	"Afterimage"
2024	Justice	"Incognito"

=== Mixes ===
Year	Title	Format	Label
2007	Essential Mix	Radio mix	BBC Radio 1
2007	Justice XMAS Mix / DJ Mix Leur Selection	Digital download / CD	Ed Banger Records / Tron Records
2012	Rock Minimix	Radio mix / Digital download	BBC Radio 1 (Annie Mac Show)
2012	Justice Live at SiriusXM Studios	Radio mix	SiriusXM
2016	Essential Mix	Radio mix	BBC Radio 1
2024	Apple Music NYE 2025	Stream / Radio mix	Apple Music

=== Songwriting and production credits ===
Title	Year	Artist(s)	Album	Contributing member(s)
"Disco Sirens"	2008	Midfield General	—N/a	Xavier de Rosnay
"The Parachute Ending"	2009	Birdy Nam Nam	Manual For Successful Rioting	Justice
No Problem (album)	2009	Jamaica	—N/a	Xavier de Rosnay
Rubber (soundtrack album)	2010	Mr. Oizo	—N/a	Gaspard Augé
"Tetra"	2011	SebastiAn	Total	Gaspard Augé
"Odd Nite"	2017	DVNO	—N/a	Xavier de Rosnay
"Beginnings"	2021	Prudence	Beginnings	Xavier de Rosnay
"Diamonds + And Pearls"	2021	DPR Live, DPR Ian, peace.	Shang-Chi and the Legend of the Ten Rings: The Album	Gaspard Augé, Xavier de Rosnay
Reborn (album)	2022	Kavinsky	—N/a	Gaspard Augé
"Flamme"	2022	Juliette Armanet	Brûler le feu 2	Xavier de Rosnay
Man on a Wire (EP)	2022	DVNO	—N/a	Xavier de Rosnay
"Wake Me Up"	2025	The Weeknd, Justice	Hurry Up Tomorrow	Gaspard Augé, Xavier de Rosnay
"Gyro-Drop"	2025	G-Dragon	Übermensch	Xavier de Rosnay
"What You Want"	2026	Angèle, Justice	Instinct	Gaspard Augé, Xavier de Rosnay
