= List of awards and nominations received by Justice =

Justice awards and nominations
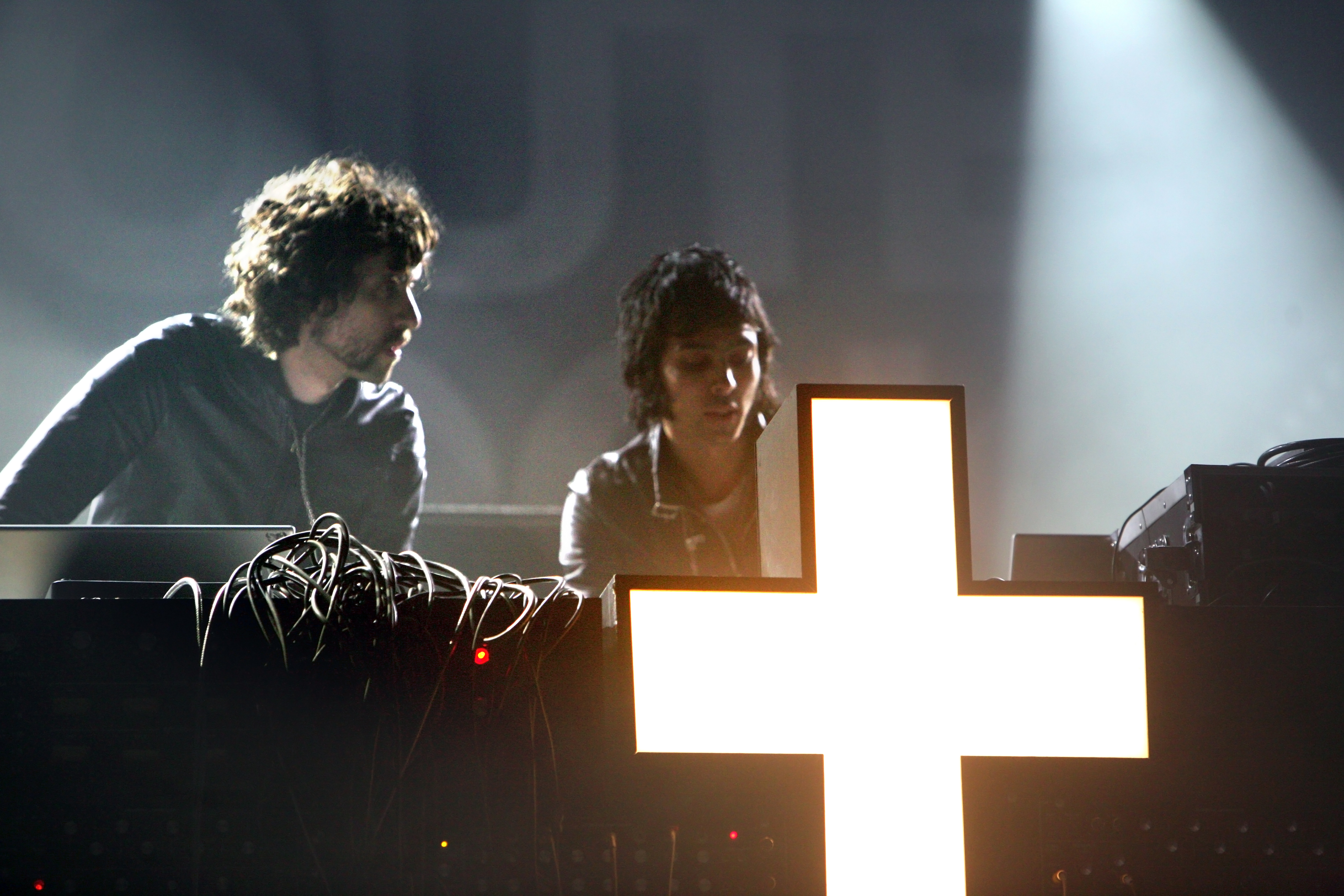
- Justice in concert, 2007
Awards and nominations
Award	Wins	Nominations
Grammy	3	7
MTV Europe	3	4
MTV VMA	0	1
NRJ	1	6
Shortlist	0	3
Victoires de la Musique	3	8

Totals (Note: Certain award groups do not simply award one winner. They acknowledge several different recipients, have runners-up, and have third place. Since this is a specific recognition and is different from losing an award, runner-up mentions are considered wins in this award tally. For simplification and to avoid errors, each award in this list has been presumed to have had a prior nomination.)
- Wins: 16
- Nominations: 36

Justice's debut album, †, was nominated for a Grammy Award for "Best Electronic/Dance Album" and it was also nominated for the 2007 Shortlist Prize, but lost to The Reminder by Feist. The duo has been successful at the MTV Europe Music Awards, winning three awards: "Best Video" for "We Are Your Friends" in 2006 and "D.A.N.C.E." in 2007, and "Best French Act" for the band, also in 2007. Their remix of the MGMT song "Electric Feel" won the Grammy Award for Best Remixed Recording, Non-Classical in 2009 and their album Woman Worldwide won the Grammy Award for Best Electronic/Dance Album in 2019. Overall, Justice has received fifteen awards from thirty-five nominations.

== Antville Music Video Awards ==
The Antville Music Video Awards are online awards for the best music video and music video directors of the year. They were first awarded in 2005. Justice has received two awards from nine nominations.

Year	Nominee / work	Award	Result
2006	"We Are Your Friends"	Most Fun Video	Nominated
2007	"D.A.N.C.E."	Best Animated Video	Nominated
2008	"Stress"	Best Editing	Won
2008	"Stress"	Best Cinematography	Won
2008	"Stress"	Video of the Year	Nominated
2008	"DVNO"	Best Animated Video	Nominated
2011	"Civilization"	Best Animated Video	Nominated
2012	"New Lands"	Best Visual Effects	Nominated
2012	Themselves	Best Commissioning Artist	Nominated

== Electronic Music Awards ==
Year	Nominee / work	Award	Result
2017	Woman	Album of the Year	Nominated

== The Game Awards ==
Year	Nominee / work	Award	Result
2026	Grand Theft Auto VI	Best Score and Music	Pending

== Grammy Awards ==
The Grammy Awards are awarded annually by the National Academy of Recording Arts and Sciences of the United States.

Year	Nominee / work	Award	Result
2008	"D.A.N.C.E."	Best Short Form Music Video	Nominated
2008	"D.A.N.C.E."	Best Dance Recording	Nominated
2008	†	Best Electronic/Dance Album	Nominated
2009	"Electric Feel (Justice Remix)"	Best Remixed Recording, Non-Classical	Won
2019	Woman Worldwide	Best Dance/Electronic Album	Won
2025	"Neverender" (with Tame Impala)	Best Dance/Electronic Recording	Won
2025	Hyperdrama	Best Dance/Electronic Album	Nominated

== International Dance Music Awards ==
The International Dance Music Award was established in 1985. It is a part of the Winter Music Conference, a weeklong electronic music event held annually.

Year	Nominee / work	Award	Result
2008	Themselves	Best Breakthrough Artist (Group)	Won
2008	"D.A.N.C.E."	Best Dance Music Video	Won
2008	"D.A.N.C.E."	Best Alternative/Rock Dance Track	Nominated

== MTV Europe Music Awards ==
The MTV Europe Music Awards is an annual awards ceremony established in 1994 by MTV Europe.

Year	Nominee / work	Award	Result
2006	"We Are Your Friends"	Best Video	Won
2007	"D.A.N.C.E."	Best Video	Won
2007	Justice	Best French Act	Won
2011	"Civilization"	Best Video	Nominated

== MTV Video Music Awards ==
The MTV Video Music Awards is an annual awards ceremony established in 1984 by MTV.

Year	Nominee / work	Award	Result
2007	"D.A.N.C.E."	Video of the Year	Nominated

== NME Awards ==
The NME Awards are an annual music awards show founded by the music magazine NME. Justice received one awards from three nominations.

Year	Nominee / work	Award	Result
2008	"D.A.N.C.E."	Best Alternative / Indie Music Video	Won
2012	Themselves	Best International Band	Nominated
2012	"Civilization"	Best Dancefloor Anthem	Nominated

== NRJ Music Awards ==
The NRJ Music Awards is an annual French awards ceremony created by the NRJ radio station and the TF1 television network.

Year	Nominee / work	Award	Result
2008	Justice	Best New Artist	Nominated
2008	"D.A.N.C.E."	Best Video	Nominated

== RTHK International Pop Poll Awards ==
Year	Nominee / work	Award	Result	Ref.
2008	Justice	Top New Act	Nominated	

== Shortlist Music Prize ==
The Shortlist Music Prize is a music award given annually to an album released in the United States within the last year.

Year	Nominee / work	Award	Result
2007	†	Shortlist Music Prize	Nominated

== Victoires de la Musique ==
The Victoires de la Musique is an annual French award ceremony.

Year	Nominee / work	Award	Result
2008	Justice	Best Electronic/Dance Act	Won
2008	"D.A.N.C.E."	Best Video	Nominated
2012	Audio Video Disco	Best Electronic/Dance Album	Won
2017	Justice	Best Electronic/Dance Act	Nominated
2025	Justice	Best Male Artists	Nominated
2025	Hyperdrama	Best Album	Nominated
2025	"Neverender"	Best Video	Nominated
2026	Justice	Best Live Act	Won

== UK Festival Awards ==
Year	Nominee / work	Award	Result	Ref.
2007	Justice	Best Dance Act	Nominated	
2008	Justice	Best Dance Act	Nominated	

== UK Video Music Awards ==
Year	Nominee / work	Award	Result
2008	"Stress"	Best International Video	Won
2010	"Let Love Rule (feat. Lenny Kravitz)"	Best International Video	Nominated
2011	"Civilization"	Best Pop Video - International	Nominated
2011	"Civilization"	Best Art Direction & Design	Nominated
2011	"Civilization"	Best Visual Effects	Nominated
2012	"New Lands"	Best Visual Effects	Won
2012	"New Lands"	Best Editing	Nominated
2012	"New Lands"	Best Telecine	Nominated
2012	"New Lands"	Best Dance Video - International	Nominated
2012	"Audio, Video, Disco."	Best Dance Video - International	Nominated
2012	"On'n'On"	Best Pop Video - International	Nominated
2026	"What You Want" (with Angèle)	Best Pop Video - International	Pending

== Žebřík Music Awards ==
Year	Nominee / work	Award	Result	Ref.
2007	Themselves	Best International Discovery	Nominated	
2007	"D.A.N.C.E."	Best International Video	Nominated	

== Berlin Music Video Awards ==
Year	Nominee / work	Award	Result	Ref.
2024	"One Night/All Night"	Best Animation	Nominated	
2024	"Generator"	Best VFX	Nominated	
