= Roskilde Festival 2017 =

- Dates: 24 June–1 July 2017
- Locations: Darupvej, Roskilde, Denmark
- Website: roskilde-festival.com

The Roskilde Festival 2017 was held on 24 June to 1 July 2017 in Roskilde, Denmark. The festival was headlined by The Weeknd, Justice, The xx, Solange, Bryson Tiller, Foo Fighters, Trentemøller, Nas, Arcade Fire and Ice Cube.

== Headlining set lists ==
Wednesday, 28 June 2017

Justice
1. "Safe and Sound"
2. "D.A.N.C.E."
3. "Canon" / "Love S.O.S."
4. "Genesis"
5. "Phantom" / "Pleasure" / "Newjack"
6. "Civilization" / "Heavy Metal" / "DVNO"
7. "Stress"
8. "Love S.O.S."
9. "Alakazam !" / "Fire" / "Love S.O.S."
10. "Waters of Nazareth" / "We Are Your Friends"
11. "Chorus"
12. "Audio, Video, Disco"
The Weeknd
1. "Starboy"
2. "Party Monster"
3. "Reminder"
4. "Six Feet Under"
5. "Low Life"
6. "Might Not"
7. "Sidewalks"
8. "Or Nah"
9. "Acquainted"
10. "Wicked Games"
11. "Often"
12. "Tell Your Friends"
13. "Die for You"
14. "Rockin'"
15. "Secrets"
16. "Can't Feel My Face"
17. "I Feel It Coming"
18. "The Hills"

Thursday, 29 June 2017

Nas
1. "Get Down"
2. "N.Y. State of Mind"
3. "Life's a Bitch"
4. "Halftime"
5. "If I Ruled the World (Imagine That)"
6. "Hate Me Now"
7. "Human Nature"
8. "It Ain't Hard to Tell"
9. "Sweet Dreams (Are Made of This)"
10. "Street Dreams"
11. "I Can"
12. "Shook Ones (Part II)"
13. "Got Ur Self a Gun"
14. "Made You Look"
15. "One Mic"

Friday, 30 June 2017

Foo Fighters
1. "All My Life"
2. "Times Like These"
3. "Learn to Fly"
4. "Something from Nothing"
5. "The Pretender"
6. "Cold Day In The Sun"
7. "Congregation"
8. "Walk"
9. "These Days"
10. "My Hero"
11. "Skin and Bones"
12. "White Limo"
13. "Arlandria"
14. "Monkey Wrench"
15. "Wheels"
16. "Run"
17. "Best of You"
18. "Everlong"

Saturday, 1 July 2017

Arcade Fire
1. "Wake Up"
2. "Everything Now"
3. "Here Comes the Night Time"
4. "Signs of Life"
5. "No Cars Go"
6. "The Suburbs"
7. "Ready to Start"
8. "Month of May"
9. "Neighborhood #1 (Tunnels)"
10. "Sprawl II (Mountains Beyond Mountains)"
11. "Reflektor"
12. "Afterlife"
13. "Creature Comfort"
14. "Neighborhood #3 (Power Out)"
15. "Rebellion (Lies)"
16. "Neon Bible"

== Lineup ==
Headline performers are listed in boldface. Artists listed from latest to earliest set times.

Orange
Wednesday, 28 June 2017	Thursday, 29 June 2017	Friday, 30 June 2017	Saturday, 1 July 2017
**Justice**; **The Weeknd**; Phlake	**Nas**; **The xx**; Royal Blood; The Savage Rose	Den Sorte Skole; **Foo Fighters**; Father John Misty; Seun Kuti & Egypt 80 feat. Yasiin Bey	Moderat/Modeselektor; **Arcade Fire**; **Ice Cube**; The Lumineers

Arena
Wednesday, 28 June 2017	Thursday, 29 June 2017	Friday, 30 June 2017	Saturday, 1 July 2017
The Hellacopters; G-Eazy; Warpaint	The Jesus and Mary Chain; **Bryson Tiller**; Erasure; **Solange**; Future Islands; Carl Emil Petersen	Icona Pop; Lorde; **Trentemøller**; Against Me!; Tinashe; Tivoli Philharmonic Orchestra	Sort Sol; Residente; Anthrax; Halsey; Kellermensch; Emil Stabil

Apollo
Wednesday, 28 June 2017	Thursday, 29 June 2017	Friday, 30 June 2017	Saturday, 1 July 2017
Bonobo; Bicep; Rüfüs; Young M.A	KiNK feat. Rachel Row; Nicolas Jaar; Discwoman; 67; Clams Casino; Acid Arab; Sigrid	AV AV AV; The Avalanches; Kano; Møme; Fatima Yamaha; 47Soul; Noname; First Hate	Noisia; Lil Uzi Vert; Cashmere Cat; Krept and Konan; Bjarki; Ibaaku

Pavilion
Wednesday, 28 June 2017	Thursday, 29 June 2017	Friday, 30 June 2017	Saturday, 1 July 2017
Hamid El Kasri Gnaoua Ensemble feat. Justin Adams; Kevin Morby; Marching Church; Idles	Princess Nokia; Viagra Boys; Hamilton Leithauser; Oathbreaker; Shame; Dub De Gaita - Los Gaiteros de San Jacinto; Blood Command; Julia Jacklin	Moon Duo; Wiki; Basokin; Mammut; Afenginn; Of Mice & Men; Karen Elson; Nils Bech	Show Me the Body; Group Doueh & Cheveu; Priests; Trap Them; Full of Hell; Aaron Lee Tasjan; Pig Destroyer

Avalon
Wednesday, 28 June 2017	Thursday, 29 June 2017	Friday, 30 June 2017	Saturday, 1 July 2017
Rag'n'Bone Man; Red Fang; Alsarah & The Nubatones; A Day to Remember	High on Fire; Jah9; Gucci Mane; Elza Soares; Margo Price; Popcaan; Hun Solo	Cult of Luna; Jagwar Ma; La Mambanegra; Mats Gustafsson's Nu Ensemble "Hidros Zap"; Angel Olsen; Karl William; Cancer	Freddie Gibbs; Baby Woodrose; Baianasystem; Neurosis; Slowdive; Jenny Hval; Digable Planets; The Rumour Said Fire

Gloria
Wednesday, 28 June 2017	Thursday, 29 June 2017	Friday, 30 June 2017	Saturday, 1 July 2017
75 Dollar Bill; Madame Gandhi; Vanishing Twin	Ifriqiyya Electrique; Tim Darcy; Author & Punisher; Ayia; András; Księżyc; Pert Near Sandstone; Lorenzo Woodrose	Noga Erez; BCUC; Boujeloud; Botany; Alex Cameron; Hieroglyphic Being; Svin; '68	Atomikylä; Oranssi Pazuzu; PH/MR Peter Hayden Band; Romperayo; Janka Nabay & The Nubu Gang; Black String; Circuit des Yeux; Debashish Bhattacharya

Rising
Sunday, 25 June 2017	Monday, 26 June 2017	Tuesday, 27 June 2017
School of X; Auðn; Hater; Sibiir; Værket; Barselona; Natjager	Fugleflugten; Baest; Pom Poko; The Kutimangoes; ML Buch; Tvivler; Franske Piger	The Love Coffin; Dør Nr. 13; Ştiu Nu Ştiu; Shitkid; Odd Couple; Modest; Pardans

Countdown
Sunday, 25 June 2017	Monday, 26 June 2017	Tuesday, 27 June 2017
Kornél Kovács; Solid Blake; Mechatok; Purpurrpurple; Ayowa; Caius	Noah Carter; Noréll; Skott; Monti; Ary; Bogfinkevej	Gangly; Silvester; Snow Boyz; Mattis; Farveblind; Irah

== Cancelled acts ==
- A Tribe Called Quest, replaced by Ice Cube
- Blink-182, replaced by The Hellacopters
- Weyes Blood, replaced by Tim Darcy
