= Woman Worldwide =

Remix album by Justice
- Released: 24 August 2018
- Genre: Electronic
- Length: 84:36
- Labels: Ed Banger; Because
- Producers: Gaspard Augé; Xavier de Rosnay

Justice chronology
Woman (2016)	Woman Worldwide (2018)	Hyperdrama (2024)

Singles from Woman Worldwide
- 1. "Stop (WWW)" Released: 7 May 2018; 2. "D.A.N.C.E." x "Fire" x "Safe and Sound (WWW)" Released: 22 June 2018; 3. "Randy (WWW)" Released: 6 July 2018; 4. "Chorus (WWW)" Released: 16 August 2018; 5. "Love S.O.S. (WWW)" Released: 31 October 2018

Woman Worldwide is a remix album by French electronic music duo Justice, released on 24 August 2018 by Ed Banger Records and Because Music. Self-described as "10 years of Justice mixed and remixed", the album features reworked tracks from their discography. The album was recorded similarly to the duo's live performances.

== Background and release ==
Justice began working on the stage production and tracklist for Woman Worldwide in June 2016. The album incorporates material from their discography. The duo wrote down every track they released at the time and broke down every song by tempo, key, and how much they wanted to incorporate each song into their live set. As the live set was still being finalized, the band rehearsed the live set for months. The band stated they rehearsed their material from two to five hours every day.

The album was announced on 10 May 2018 after their performance at the 2018 Google I/O conference in Mountain View, California. A music video for "Stop" was also uploaded to Justice's YouTube account, with the Woman Worldwide edit of "Stop" released as the album's lead single on 7 May 2018. "D.A.N.C.E." x "Fire" x "Safe and Sound" was released as the album's second single on 22 June 2018. The third single, "Randy" (WWW), was released on 6 July 2018. "Chorus (WWW)", the album's fourth single, was released on 16 August 2018. The album was released on 24 August 2018, and charted in the UK and US dance charts, at positions 6 and 22 respectively. It also charted at number 10 in France, as well as other European countries. “Love S.O.S (WWW)”, the fifth and final single, was released on 31 October 2018.

== Critical reception ==
Professional ratings
Aggregate scores
Source	Rating
AnyDecentMusic?	6.2/10
Metacritic	69/100
Review scores
Source	Rating
AllMusic	3.5/5 stars
Paste	7.8/10
PopMatters	6/10 stars
Rolling Stone	3.5/5 stars
Slant Magazine	2.5/5 stars

The album has received generally favorable reviews from critics. At Metacritic, which assigns a normalized rating out of 100 to reviews from mainstream publications, the album received an average score of 69, based on 9 reviews.

The album received a Grammy Award for Best Dance/Electronic Album at the 61st Annual Grammy Awards.

== Track listing ==
All tracks are written by Gaspard Augé and Xavier de Rosnay unless noted.

Woman Worldwide track listing
No.	Title	Length
1.	"Safe and Sound"	7:32
2.	"D.A.N.C.E."	3:16
3.	"Canon" x "Love S.O.S."	4:47
4.	"Genesis" x "Phantom"	4:45
5.	"Pleasure" x "Newjack" x "Civilization"	5:38
6.	"Heavy Metal" x "DVNO"	4:43
7.	"Stress"	5:48
8.	"Love S.O.S."	4:45
9.	"Alakazam !" x "Fire"	6:09
10.	"Waters of Nazareth" x "We Are Your Friends" x "Phantom 2"	6:31
11.	"Chorus"	6:04
12.	"Audio, Video, Disco"	6:17
13.	"Stop"	4:26
14.	"Randy"	7:33
15.	"D.A.N.C.E." x "Fire" x "Safe and Sound"	6:22
Total length:		84:36

== Personnel ==
Adapted from liner notes.

- Gaspard Augé – writing, production
- Xavier de Rosnay – writing, production
- Thomas Jumin – artwork

== Accolades ==
Accolades for Woman Worldwide
Association	Year	Category	Result
Grammy Awards	2019	Best Dance/Electronic Album of the Year	Won

== Charts ==
Chart performance for Woman Worldwide
Chart (2018)	Peak position
Austrian Albums (Ö3 Austria)	38
Belgian Albums (Ultratop Flanders)	24
Belgian Albums (Ultratop Wallonia)	37
Dutch Albums (Album Top 100)	169
French Albums (SNEP)	10
German Albums (Offizielle Top 100)	48
Spanish Albums (Promusicae)	22
Swiss Albums (Schweizer Hitparade)	29
UK Dance Albums (Official Charts)	6
US Top Dance Albums (Billboard)	22

== Release history ==
Release history for Woman Worldwide
Region	Date	Format	Label	Ref.
Various	24 August 2018	Digital download	Ed Banger; Because	
Various	24 August 2018	CD	Ed Banger; Because	
Various	24 August 2018	Vinyl	Ed Banger; Because	
