= Access All Arenas =

Live album by Justice
- Released: 7 May 2013
- Recorded: 19 July 2012
- Genre: Electro house; electronic rock; disco house; electroclash
- Length: 79:25
- Label: Ed Banger; Because
- Producer: Gaspard Augé; Xavier de Rosnay

Justice chronology
Audio, Video, Disco (2011)	Access All Arenas (2013)	Woman (2016)

Access All Arenas is the second live album by French house music duo Justice. It was released on 7 May 2013. The album was recorded at the Arena of Nîmes on 19 July 2012.

Access All Arenas received mostly positive reviews upon its release. Multiple reviewers praised the live energy captured in the album, with its imperfections and crowd noise being present throughout, as well as the variety of styles that seamlessly blend together.

== Release ==
Initially, the song "On'n'On" was released on the official Justice YouTube channel on 26 March 2013 as a promotion for the full album. The album was released on streaming services such as Spotify and their own official website for the album on 2 May 2013, while distribution mediums such as Amazon.com or iTunes released the album on the official date of 7 May 2013.

== Critical reception ==
Professional ratings
Review scores
Source	Rating
AllMusic	3.5/5 stars
Consequence of Sound	C−
Pitchfork	7.8/10
PopMatters	7/10 discs

The album received generally positive reviews upon release. Pitchfork praised how the music had unmistakable flaws indicative of live performance, noting that this gives the album "an organic energy" in contrast with other dance acts where pre-sequenced music would play. Pitchfork also noted how they recorded tones of crowd noise, concluding that "even if you weren't there to appreciate the show in person, they'll make damn sure you know that 2,000 others did." Consequence of Sound, in a three-star review, praised the variety of styles in the album, saying "Access All Arenas threads seamlessly from one track into the next, touching upon everything from Zeppelin-like riffage (“Canon”) and cock rock bombast (“Newlands”) to slick odes to ’70s funk and disco (“D.A.N.C.E.”), all underpinned by an omnipresent house beat." PopMatters also commented on the performance aspect, expressing that "Justice actually does its best to play the music, rather than leaning on Ableton or some other digital interface to spit out slightly modified stems". PopMatters also mentioned similarities between this album and Audio, Video, Disco, Justice's last album.

== Track listing ==
Access All Arenas track listing
No.	Title	Samples	Length
1.	"Genesis"	Contains samples of "Civilization", and a sample from "Toccata and Fugue in D minor" by Johann Sebastian Bach	7:45
2.	"Helix"	Contains samples of "Phantom", and a sample from "Kiss" by Prince	4:06
3.	"Phantom"	Contains samples of "Let There Be Light", and a sample from "Tenebre" of the Tenebrae OST album by Goblin	4:41
4.	"Civilization"	Contains samples of "Newjack", and a sample from "You Make Me Wanna Wiggle" by Brothers Johnson	6:04
5.	"Canon"	Contains samples of "D.A.N.C.E."	4:11
6.	"D.A.N.C.E."	Contains samples of "D.A.N.C.E." (Rehearsal Version), "D.A.N.C.E." (Justice Remix), and a sample from "On to the Next One" by Jay Z	5:58
7.	"Horsepower"	Contains samples of "DVNO"	5:24
8.	"New Lands"		4:30
9.	"Stress"	Contains samples of "Skitzo Dancer" by Scenario Rock, and "Stress" (Auto Remix)	5:36
10.	"Waters of Nazareth"	Contains samples of "Waters of Nazareth (Erol Alkan's Durrr Durrr Durrrrrr Re-Edit)", "We Are Your Friends", "Helix", "Phantom Pt. II", and "On'n'On"	6:53
11.	"Audio, Video, Disco."		9:58
12.	"Encore"		0:46
13.	"On'n'On"	Contains samples of "We Are Your Friends"	5:34
14.	"Phantom Pt. II"	Contains samples of "Phantom Pt. II" (Soulwax Remix), and "We Are Your Friends"	7:58
