= A Cross the Universe (film) =

- Directed by: Romain Gavras; So Me; Justice
- Produced by: Romain Gavras; So Me; Justice
- Starring: Justice
- Music by: Justice
- Release date: 2008
- Running time: 65 minutes
- Country: France
- Languages: French; English

A Cross the Universe is a 2008 documentary film about the French electronic music duo Justice, directed by Romain Gavras, So Me and Justice themselves. The film was released alongside a live album of the same name.

== Background ==
The film follows Justice's March 2008 North American tour. The documentary is directed by Romain Gavras, So Me and the band themselves. The documentary is meant to cover fewer of the band's live shows, and more of their personal experience touring.

The live portion of this release was recorded at a concert in San Francisco, California at the Concourse Exhibition Center, on 27 March 2008.

== DVD song credits ==
Title	Notes
"DVNO"	
"D.A.N.C.E"	
"NY Excuse"	Is a Justice remix of the track of the same name by Soulwax
"Phantom Part 2"	Contains samples from Tenebrae by Goblin
"Waters of Nazareth (Prelude)"	Contains samples from "The Fallen" (Justice Remix) by Franz Ferdinand
"Genesis"	
"We Are Your Friends (Reprise)"	Contains samples from "Never Be Alone" by Simian, "Atlantis to Interzone" by Klaxons, "Just One Fix" by Ministry
"Final"	Contains samples from "Master of Puppets" by Metallica
"Pedrophilia"	Song by Busy P
"Pocket Piano"	Song by DJ Mehdi
"Psychotic Reaction"	Song by Count Five
"Love Me, Please Love Me"	Song by Michel Polnareff

== Reception ==
Reception of the film has been positive.

Justine JC of Scene Crave wrote, "The cinematography is artistic and raw, yet deft, making the mess of a story line (well, lack there of [sic]...) strangely engaging. The film is literally an arbitrary compilation of the people and events involved in the band's tour."
