= Grand Theft Auto VI: Original Score =

Soundtrack album by Justice
- Released: 11 December 2026
- Genre: Electronic
- Labels: Ed Banger; Because
- Producer: Justice

Justice chronology
Hyperdrama (2024)	Grand Theft Auto VI: Original Score (2026)

Singles from Grand Theft Auto VI: Original Score
- 1. "Flower in a Hurricane" Released: 15 October 2026; 2. "Pusher" Released: 29 October 2026; 3. "Starting from Zero" Released: 20 November 2026

Grand Theft Auto VI: Original Score is the score for the 2026 video game Grand Theft Auto VI, composed by French electronic duo Justice. It is scheduled for release on 11 December 2026 through Ed Banger and Because Music.

== Background ==
On 15 October 2026, Rockstar Games announced that French electronic duo Justice would be composing the original score for Grand Theft Auto VI, with the Justice track "Flower in a Hurricane" released as a single from the compilation album Grand Theft Auto VI: The Album. On 29 October, Grand Theft Auto VI: Original Score was announced for release on 11 December in digital, double CD, and triple LP formats. Physical releases will feature 30 tracks while the digital release comprises 50 tracks totalling 3 hours of original music. The same day, "Pusher" featuring Gesaffelstein was released as a single.

== Composition ==
When composing music for Grand Theft Auto VI, Xavier de Rosnay said the duo was "given the freedom to explore as many things as we needed to, musically speaking" to build a soundtrack that fit the game's broad scope and scale. Justice knew when they began working on the soundtrack that the music they created would "have to be very broad in terms of emotions, genres, and textures". The duo considers the score a "special project" and a "real" Justice album, further explaining that it should be listenable on its own even as certain tracks are composed for select setpieces within the game.

== Release ==
Pre-orders for Grand Theft Auto VI: Original Score began on 29 October with the soundtrack being available as a triple LP record on black or limited-edition clear vinyl.

== Reception ==
Katie Bain of Billboard wrote that "Pusher" evoked the Justice tracks "Stress" and "Generator" due to its "darkly pummeling synths and pacing fit for an action sequence".

== Track listing ==
Grand Theft Auto VI: Original Score digital track listing
No.	Title	Writer(s)	Length
1.	"Starting from Zero" (featuring Michael McDonald)	Gaspard Augé; Xavier de Rosnay; Michael McDonald; Dylan McDonald	3:09
18.	"Pusher" (featuring Gesaffelstein)	de Rosnay; Augé; Mike Lévy	7:02
36.	"Flower in a Hurricane" (featuring Tame Impala, SZA, and King Gizzard & the Lizard Wizard)	Ambrose Kenny-Smith; Augé; Joey Walker; Kevin Parker; Lucas Harwood; Michael Cavanagh; Nicholas Craig; Sarah Aarons; Solana Rowe; Stu Mackenzie; de Rosnay	3:44

== Personnel ==
Justice

- Gaspard Augé – production, mixing
- Xavier de Rosnay – production, mixing

Additional musicians

- Michael McDonald – keyboards, vocals (on "Starting From Zero")
- Romain Berguin – keyboards (on "Starting From Zero")
- Adrien Soleiman – saxophone (on "Starting From Zero")
- Gesaffelstein – production (on "Pusher")
- Hollywood Scoring – strings (on "Pusher")
- Tame Impala – guitar, vocals (on "Flower in a Hurricane")
- SZA – vocals (on "Flower in a Hurricane")
- King Gizzard & the Lizard Wizard – production (on "Flower in a Hurricane")

Technical personnel

- Matt Colton – mastering (on "Starting From Zero", "Pusher", "Flower in a Hurricane")
- Eric J Dubowsky – mixing engineer (on "Starting From Zero", "Pusher", "Flower in a Hurricane")
- Mendy Stein – assistant mixing engineer (on "Starting From Zero", "Pusher", "Flower in a Hurricane")
- Dom Camardella – recording engineer (on "Starting From Zero")
- Hector Castro – recording engineer (on "Flower in a Hurricane")
- Kevin Parker – recording engineer (on "Flower in a Hurricane")
