= Planisphère =

Extended play by Justice

- 2022 physical release cover art

EP by Justice
- Released: 2008
- Genre: Electronic
- Length: 17:38
- Label: Ed Banger; Because Music
- Producer: Gaspard Augé; Xavier de Rosnay

Justice chronology
† (2007)	Planisphère (2008)	A Cross the Universe (2008)

Planisphère is a four-part electronic composition by French duo Justice. Originally commissioned by French fashion house Dior for the Dior Homme Spring/Summer 2009 runway show in 2008, the piece was released as a four-part EP on the band's Myspace page.

A complete version of the track, with the four parts combined, was featured as a iTunes-exclusive bonus track on their next studio album Audio, Video, Disco. In October 2022, the EP was reissued onto streaming services and pressed on 12" vinyl for the first time.

The duo's first release after their debut album †, the piece has been called a "cult favourite" by NME and their third best song by Billboard.

== Track listing ==
All tracks are written and produced by Gaspard Augé and Xavier de Rosnay.

No.	Title	Length
1.	"Planisphere Part. I"	7:22
2.	"Planisphere Part. II"	2:17
3.	"Planisphere Part. III"	3:30
4.	"Planisphere Part. IV"	4:27

Notes

- "Part III" contains a sample of "Me Against the Music" by Britney Spears and Madonna.
