= Woman (Justice album) =

Studio album by Justice
- Released: 18 November 2016
- Genres: Disco; funk
- Length: 54:10
- Labels: Ed Banger; Because
- Producer: Justice

Justice chronology
Access All Arenas (2013)	Woman (2016)	Woman Worldwide (2018)

Singles from Woman
- 1. "Safe and Sound" Released: 13 July 2016; 2. "Randy" Released: 14 September 2016; 3. "Alakazam !" Released: 21 October 2016; 4. "Fire (radio edit)" Released: 18 November 2016

Woman is the third studio album by French electronic music duo Justice, released on 18 November 2016 by Ed Banger Records and Because Music.

Woman received generally positive reviews upon release. Many reviewers praised its blending of funk, disco, and electronic music influences, while highlighting its powerful and direct sound. The album includes contributions from several guest musicians, including Romuald, Morgan Phalen, and Johnny Blake.

== Overview ==
Four singles were issued from the LP which are "Safe and Sound", "Randy", "Alakazam !", and "Fire". Xavier de Rosnay described the album as being "like if you're in the car with your best friend and your lover and your kids."

== Critical reception ==
Professional ratings
Aggregate scores
Source	Rating
AnyDecentMusic?	6.8/10
Metacritic	69/100
Review scores
Source	Rating
AllMusic	3.5/5 stars
Consequence of Sound	B−
DIY	4/5 stars
Exclaim!	9/10
The Guardian	3/5 stars
Mixmag	8/10
MusicOMH	3/5 stars
NME	4/5 stars
Pitchfork	5.2/10
Slant Magazine	4/5 stars

Woman received a score of 69 out of 100 on review aggregator Metacritic based on 22 critics' reviews, indicating "generally favorable" reception. Heather Phares of AllMusic called Woman "an enjoyable album" that's "built on layers of fondly remembered vintage funk and disco, pre-EDM French Touch, and Gaspard Augé and Xavier de Rosnay's own work." Danny Wright of DIY noted that the LP sees Justice "adding some fierce slap to the bass, bringing psychedelic disco to the prog and metal dance mix" with a "sound is still huge, still bludgeoningly and pleasingly direct." Mehan Jayasuriya of Pitchfork gave the album 5.2 out of 10, calling it "middle-of-the-road pop: generically funky melodies, cheesy guitar solos, forgettable vocals, lyrics that are downright embarrassing." Kitty Empire of The Guardian gave the album 3 out of 5 stars.

== Track listing ==
Woman track listing
No.	Title	Writer(s)	Length
1.	"Safe and Sound"	Gaspard Augé; Xavier de Rosnay	5:45
2.	"Pleasure"	Augé; Xavier de Rosnay; Morgan Phalen	4:15
3.	"Alakazam !"	Augé; Rosnay	5:11
4.	"Fire"	Augé; Rosnay; Romuald Lauverjon; May Yamani	5:34
5.	"Stop"	Augé; Rosnay; Johnny Blake	4:57
6.	"Chorus"	Augé; Rosnay	7:09
7.	"Randy"	Augé; Rosnay; Phalen	6:38
8.	"Heavy Metal"	Augé; Rosnay	4:30
9.	"Love S.O.S."	Augé; Rosnay; Lauverjon	5:03
10.	"Close Call"	Augé; Rosnay	5:08
Total length:			54:10

Notes

- "Safe and Sound" features lead vocals sung by the London Contemporary Orchestra
- "Pleasure" features lead vocals by Morgan Phalen
- "Alakazam !" contains a sample from "Complexion (A Zulu Love)" by Kendrick Lamar feat. Rapsody
- "Fire" features lead vocals by Romuald Lauverjon
- "Stop" features lead vocals by Johnny Blake
- "Randy" features vocals by Morgan Phalen
- "Love S.O.S." features vocals by Romuald Lauverjon

== Charts ==
=== Weekly charts ===
Weekly chart performance for Woman
Chart (2016)	Peak position
Australian Albums (ARIA)	66
Austrian Albums (Ö3 Austria)	44
Belgian Albums (Ultratop Flanders)	31
Belgian Albums (Ultratop Wallonia)	20
Canadian Albums (Billboard)	72
Czech Albums (ČNS IFPI)	86
Dutch Albums (Album Top 100)	51
French Albums (SNEP)	17
German Albums (Offizielle Top 100)	70
Italian Albums (FIMI)	54
New Zealand Heatseeker Albums (RMNZ)	8
Scottish Albums (Official Charts)	42
Spanish Albums (Promusicae)	72
UK Albums (Official Charts)	47
UK Dance Albums (Official Charts)	3
US Billboard 200	154
US Top Dance Albums (Billboard)	1

=== Year-end charts ===
Year-end chart performance for Woman
Chart (2016)	Position
French Albums (SNEP)	194
