= So Me =

French graphic designer, animator, director and music producer

- Born: Bertrand Lagros de Langeron; 4 July 1979 (age 47)
- Occupations: Graphic designer; animator; director; record producer; composer; musician

Bertrand Lagros de Langeron, known professionally as So Me, is a French graphic designer, animator, director and music producer. He is the art director for Ed Banger Records and has released music of his own on the label. He is also the main designer for the clothing company Club 75.

== History ==
He has directed and produced music videos for DJ Mehdi, Kanye West, Kid Cudi, Justice, and MGMT. He won the MTV Europe Music Award for Best Video in 2006 for Justice vs. Simian song "We Are Your Friends".

In 2008, he co-directed the Justice tour documentary A Cross the Universe with Romain Gavras. He also produced and directed the music video for "DVNO". In 2010, he directed the music video for Duck Sauce's song "Barbra Streisand", making a cameo in the video. In 2011, de Langeron joined the Los Angeles agency Caviar, which also represents the directors Alexander Payne, Ruben Fleischer, and Peter Farrelly. From 2011 to 2013, he directed the music videos for SebastiAn's "Embody", Major Lazer's "Get Free", and Pusha T's "Numbers on the Boards".

In 2021, he directed and wrote one of the six episodes of the Canal+ miniseries 6 X Confiné.e.s, "Scorpex", in which Vincent Cassel plays the lead, a DJ named Scorpex. So Me drew on his personal experience at Ed Banger Records as inspiration for this episode. In 2025, he directed his first narrative feature-length film, Banger, for Netflix. The movie sees Cassel reprising his role as "Scorpex" from the miniseries episode. 2manydjs (a.k.a. David and Stephen Dewaele of Soulwax) provided the soundtrack.
