= Safe and Sound (Justice song) =

Single by Justice

from the album Woman
- Released: 13 July 2016
- Genre: French house; nu-disco; funktronica
- Length: 5:46
- Label: Ed Banger; Because
- Songwriters: Gaspard Augé; Xavier de Rosnay
- Producer: Justice

Justice singles chronology
"Helix" (2013)	"Safe and Sound" (2016)	"Randy" (2016)

Audio video
- "Safe and Sound" on YouTube

"Safe and Sound" is a song by French electronic music duo Justice. It was released as the lead single from their third studio album, Woman, on 13 July 2016. The song debuted and peaked on the French Singles Chart at number 48.

== Background and release ==
Prior to the song's release, a user on the social media site Reddit discovered "Safe and Sound" in a DJ set by Busy P, head of Ed Banger Records, through the Shazam mobile app. On 13 July 2016, "Safe and Sound" received its first radio airplay on DJ Annie Mac's radio show on BBC Radio 1. On the same day, the song was made available as a free download, in both MP3 and WAV formats, from Justice's website.

== Critical reception ==
"Safe and Sound" received positive reviews from critics. They often praised the song's disco-like structure and sound. Ryan Reed of Rolling Stone called the song "a psychedelic disco epic built on finger snaps, synth-strings, spastic jazz-fusion synths and one of the fiercest slap-bass grooves since Patrice Rushen's 1982 classic 'Forget Me Nots'." Lyndsey Havens of Consequence of Sound compared the song to Justice's hit song "D.A.N.C.E.", citing the "repetitive, hypnotic hook and airy vocals that sail over the song’s booming synth" as a reason why. She also complimented the duo's use of a funk-like bass and synthesized strings for the song. Allison Sadlier of Entertainment Weekly wrote that the song stays true to the duo's disco-reminiscent "modern techno-style" sound and "makes for [a] dance worthy listen."

== Track listing ==
Digital download
No.	Title	Length
1.	"Safe and Sound"	5:46

== Charts ==
Chart (2016)	Peak position
Belgium (Ultratip Bubbling Under Flanders)	12
Belgium (Ultratip Bubbling Under Wallonia)	29
Belgium Dance (Ultratop Flanders)	8
Belgium Dance (Ultratop Wallonia)	37
France (SNEP)	48
