= Electro house =

Genre of music

- Stylistic origins: House; tech house; electroclash; electronica; electropop; synth-pop; electronic rock
- Cultural origins: Mid-Late 1990s
- Typical instruments: Drum machine; keyboard; personal computer; sampler; sequencer; synthesizer; vocoder
- Derivative forms: Bloghouse; brostep; dembow; jungle terror; moombahton

Subgenres
- Big room; complextro; Dutch house; fidget house; Melbourne bounce

Other topics
- Progressive house; Dark electro; Eurodance

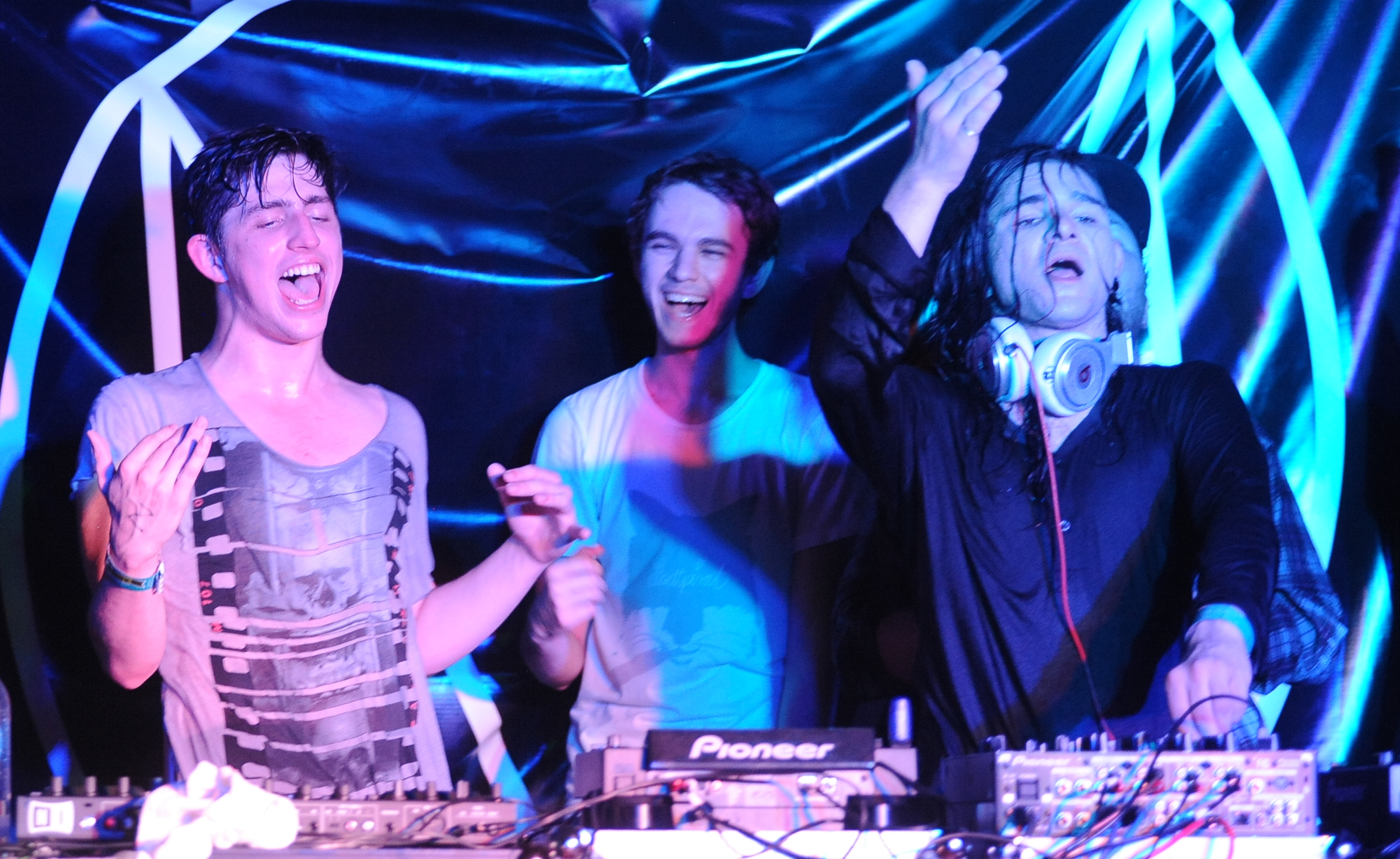
Three genre-crossing representatives: Porter Robinson (left), Zedd (center) and Skrillex (right) at South by Southwest, 2012

Electro house is a genre of electronic dance music and a subgenre of house music characterized by heavy bass, prominent melodic riffs and a tempo around 125–135 beats per minute. The term has been used to describe the music of many DJ Mag Top 100 DJs, including David Guetta, Benny Benassi, Skrillex, Steve Aoki, Porter Robinson and Deadmau5. It is generally described in terms that contrast its energy, melody and appeal to party crowds with more restrained and serious tech house and minimal techno which it is closely related to.

== Characteristics ==
Simon Reynolds described electro house's distinct style as having a "dirty bass" with "grinding and whirring sawtooth b-lines", noting this in artists like Zedd, Erol Alkan and Bloody Beetroots. That bass has often been cited as key to the sound; it is often in the form of buzzing basslines, such as those created with sawtooth waves with added distortion. It is also often in the form of large bass drum sounds in a four-on-the-floor pattern. The tempo of electro house is usually between 125 and 135 beats per minute. Electro house sometimes resembles tech house, but is more likely to prominently contain melodic elements including synth pop and electronic rock-influenced samples and synths. In contrast, Reynolds stated the genre had "little relationship with either house or electro".

== History ==
The influences that came together to make electro house have been traced to the same turn of the millennium roots as electroclash. Early tracks that have been suggested as proto electro house include "Dark Invader" (1996) by Arrivers and "Raw Shit" (1997) by Basement Jaxx. Beatportal's Definitive History of House Music says "As a reaction against the slickness of trance and filter house, people started gravitating to... big, silly bangers" in the late 1990s, citing Zombie Nation’s "Kernkraft 400" (1999), The Timo Maas remix of Azzido Da Bass’s "Doom’s Night" (2000) and Mr Oizo’s "Flat Beat" (1999), as well as tracks specifically associated with electroclash like Fischerspooner’s "Emerge" (2001) and Green Velvet’s "La La Land" (2001), all as precursors to electro house. Simon Reynolds has particularly noted influence from Daft Punk's 2001 Discovery album via fellow French acts Justice and Digitalism.

Many critics including Andy Kellman of AllMusic and Carlos Lopez of EDM Identity have pinpointed "Satisfaction" (2002) by Italian DJ Benny Benassi as being the track which defined the sound which would become codified as electro house. The British promoter John Burgess, whose Bugged Out club was an early adopter of the sound and showcased acts like Erol Alkan, also refers to Ewan Pearson’s remix of Freeform Five's "Perspex Sex" (2002) as a key early track.

Get Physical, founded in Berlin in 2002 by DJ T., M.A.N.D.Y. and Booka Shade, issued early records such as DJ T.’s "Electrofied" (2002) and M.A.N.D.Y.’s "No Stoppin’" (2003). DJ T. was later credited with helping create the label’s "electro-house sound", and Pitchfork retrospectively described "No Stoppin’" as one of M.A.N.D.Y.’s "best electro-house stormers". Cologne's Kompakt label, though generally described at the time as techno, minimal or microhouse also started incorporating more melodic riffs and hooks. Looking back in a January 2006 interview, Kompakt co-founder Michael Mayer described this as minimal techno having "learned something from electroclash in terms of discovering song structures, melodies and lyrics", characterising this as "more colourful in general", and the label’s single "Prototype" by Rex The Dog (2004) in particular has since been described as electro house.

A parallel strand came from DJs and producers with indie and rock backgrounds. In London, Erol Alkan's Monday night Trash, which he ran from 1997, mixed indie, post-punk and electronic music and became a hub for what was variously called "indie disco" and "punk funk" before feeding into electroclash. Alkan, together with the Belgian band Soulwax (also DJing as 2manydjs), who played at Trash from the late 1990s, changed London's indie discos by mixing guitar records with electronic dance music, while in New York the DFA label and the Rapture were making what Ed Banger's Pedro Winter later called "rock for dance people". Their remixes of rock bands such as Franz Ferdinand, Bloc Party and Yeah Yeah Yeahs, which typically kept rock drums under loud, distorted electronic basslines, were played alongside early electro house records. Alkan's DJ sets at Bugged Out! brought this crossover into dance clubs, and the reciprocal remixing between DJs, rock bands and electronic producers helped sustain the electro house sound for years. By 2006–07 this hybrid of electro and indie was drawing club-goers and gig audiences onto the same dancefloors. Alkan himself, whose roots were in indie clubs, was a fixture of Bugged Out!'s electro house bills, and Simon Reynolds discusses him as an electro house figure; The Quietus retrospectively described his 2005 A Bugged Out Mix for !K7 records as capturing "the electro-house zeitgeist", while Resident Advisor credited him with "blurring the lines between indie and dance music". The same scene overlapped heavily with dance-punk and what the British music press called new rave.

In Paris, Daft Punk's manager Pedro Winter founded Ed Banger Records in 2003, at a time when the French touch sound of the late 1990s had fallen out of fashion. Its roster, including Justice, Mr. Oizo, Uffie and DJ Mehdi, had a signature sound that one critic summed up as electro-tech-house with "hip-hop swagger, and punk-rock attitude and distortion", and the label was seen as a rebuke to the world of slick, corporate superstar DJs; Winter described it as "dance music that rocks people". Its main players came from rock backgrounds and presented themselves in leather jackets as rock-style stars rather than anonymous DJs; Justice's "Waters of Nazareth" (2005) became the defining track of this "rock techno" sound.

There was no stable genre name through this period: John Burgess suggests "electro house" was used on flyers from 2003 but the records were described variously in record stores and reviews as "tech house", "electro tech" and other names. However by late 2005 the major dance music publications were consistently using "electro house" as a genre name.

2006 was the breakthrough year for electro house. David Guetta's "Love Don't Let Me Go (Walking Away)", a mash-up of his 2002 single with DJ Tocadisco's remix of The Egg's "Walking Away", reached number three in the UK, and in November that year "Put Your Hands Up For Detroit" by Fedde Le Grand and the D. Ramirez remix of "Yeah Yeah" by Bodyrox and Luciana held the number one and number two spots, respectively, in the UK Top 40 singles charts. The same year, Justice's remix of the Manchester rock band Simian's "Never Be Alone", released as "We Are Your Friends", reached the UK top 20 and won Best Video at the MTV Europe Music Awards, cementing the crossover between electro house and indie; NME described Simian as "new rave godfathers". Justice's "D.A.N.C.E." (2007) and their debut album † both received Grammy nominations.

In the United States, Daft Punk's appearance at the Coachella festival in April 2006, performing inside an LED-covered pyramid, and their subsequent Alive 2006/2007 tour are widely seen as a watershed in American audiences' acceptance of electronic dance music, and as the moment it "won over the rock kids". The Canadian producer Deadmau5, whose breakthrough album Random Album Title was released by the New York label Ultra in 2008, became the "poster boy" for the rise of EDM in North America, with his tracks regularly included in electro house playlists – forming a key influence on the birth of EDM. His 2008 single "Ghosts 'n' Stuff", featuring Rob Swire of the Australian drum and bass band Pendulum, fused EDM with alternative rock and became arguably his biggest hit.

By 2011, the word "electro" had come to be seen as an adjective denoting "hard electronic dance music". In the American market, the punk-inflected aggression of electro house combined with the distorted, mid-range bass riffs of the American "brostep" associated with Skrillex, a former emo-punk singer, which critics compared to hard rock and metal. This hybrid drew rock and metal fans who had never been to dance clubs, and toured rock venues that had not previously hosted DJs; Spin wrote in 2011 that neither house nor rave-era techno had "penetrated middle America so deeply". The term EDM came to be applied in the US mainly to this mix of "big tent electro-house, American dubstep and things like this", with Guetta, Deadmau5 and Skrillex among its biggest names. Pendulum's Rob Swire and Gareth McGrillen exemplified the rock element of the sound: having toured North America with Linkin Park as Pendulum, they formed the electro house and dubstep duo Knife Party in 2011, whose aggressive, "screaming" sets made them one of the leading acts of the EDM boom. Swire said Knife Party was the duo's "only act that's ever done any damage in the States". Other electro house producers of this period who brought the electro house sound into EDM included Feed Me, The M Machine, Porter Robinson, Yasutaka Nakata and Dada Life.

From the mid-2010s the indie-crossover electro of 2006–2008 was increasingly revisited under the retrospective label "bloghouse", and in the early 2020s as part of a wider "indie sleaze" revival of the era's music and fashion.

== Subgenres ==
=== Big room ===
In the early 2010s, a type of electro house known as big room began to develop, thanks to artists like Dimitri Vegas & Like Mike, Martin Garrix, Blasterjaxx, Bassjackers, Hardwell, Ummet Ozcan and W&W, particularly gaining popularity through EDM-oriented events and festivals like Tomorrowland and Ultra. Big room songs resemble Dutch house, often incorporating drops, minimalist percussion, regular beats, sub-bass layered kicks, simple melodies and synth-driven breakdowns. The layout of a big room track is very similar to the layout of a typical electro house song.

=== Complextro ===
Complextro
- Stylistic origins: Electro house; glitch hop; dubstep; chiptune; brostep
- Cultural origins: Late 2000s – early 2010s, United States
- Typical instruments: Music sequencer; sampler; synthesizer; keyboard instrument; digital audio workstation

Complextro is typified by glitchy, intricate basslines and textures created by sharply cutting between instruments in quick succession. The term, a portmanteau of the words "complex" and "electro", was coined by Porter Robinson to describe the music he was making in 2010. He has cited video game sounds, or chiptunes, as an influence on his music, along with 1980s analog synth music.

While Robinson was the first to give the subgenre a name, he was not the creator of the general sound. No one musician can be solely considered the genre's progenitor, but its earliest origins can likely be attributed to Justice, who combined the French house style popularized by Daft Punk with the faster and more aggressive sounds emerging in electronic music in Europe. Songs like their 2005 Waters of Nazareth typify the sounds that would later become popular in complextro.

Like the sonically similar brostep subgenre, a precise definition of "complextro" is difficult to state, because of its initial popularity on the Internet (rather than in clubs) and several other factors. Notably, complextro gained popularity on YouTube gaming channels and was also used in commercials, exposing the genre to a broader audience that didn't otherwise listen to as much electronic music. Additionally, the term was often derided or used disparagingly on forums by fans of electro house or other electronic music who didn't like the new genre's sound or its fanbase. Further complicating the usage of the term was the fact that many artists who made "brostep" also produced complextro or sonically similar music, often using the same sound design techniques in both genres. A good example of this is Skrillex's Scary Monsters and Nice Sprites EP, which featured two complextro songs (Rock 'n' Roll and Kill Everybody) and two "brostep" songs (Scary Monsters and Scatta).

Other popular producers of the genre include Cash Cash, Adventure Club, Kill the Noise, Feed Me, Knife Party, The M Machine, Madeon, Mord Fustang, Savant, Virtual Riot, Wolfgang Gartner. However, the genre has recently been seeing a resurgence in the 2020s, mainly with smaller SoundCloud and independent artists.

=== Dutch house ===
Dutch house
- Stylistic origins: Electro house; tech house; Latin house; hip hop; Detroit techno; synth-pop; fidget house
- Cultural origins: Late 2000s, Netherlands
- Typical instruments: Music sequencer; sampler; synthesizer; drum machine

Dutch house, sometimes referred to as 'Dirty Dutch', is a style of electro house that originated in the Netherlands and found prominence by 2009, mainly pioneered by producers like Sidney Samson, Vato Gonzalez, Afrojack, The Partysquad, Alvaro, Hardwell and DJ Chuckie. It is primarily defined by complex rhythms made from Latin-influenced drum kits, a lower emphasis on basslines and squeaky, high-pitched lead synths. Influences on the subgenre include Detroit techno, hip hop and other urban styles of music.

=== Fidget house ===
Fidget house
- Stylistic origins: Electro house; Chicago house; Detroit techno; kuduro; Baltimore club; hip hop
- Cultural origins: Mid 2000s, Europe
- Typical instruments: Synthesizer; drum machine; Music sequencer; sampler

Fidget house, or fidget, is "defined by snatched vocal snippets, pitch-bent dirty basslines and rave-style synth stabs over glitchy 4/4 beats." It contains influences from Chicago house, Detroit techno, Baltimore club, Kuduro and hip hop. Purveyors of the genre include Sinden, AC Slater, Danger, Hervé, Jack Beats and Switch. The term fidget house was coined by DJs/producers Jesse Rose and Switch, "as a joke, which has now gone a little too far."

=== Melbourne bounce ===
Melbourne bounce
- Stylistic origins: Electro house; Dutch house; tech trance; scouse house; acid house; psytrance
- Cultural origins: Early 2010s, Australia
- Typical instruments: Music sequencer; sampler; synthesizer; keyboard instrument; digital audio workstation

Melbourne bounce is a subgenre of electro house originating in Melbourne, Australia, characterized by the progression from the uptempo, horn-infused Dutch house style, tech trance synths, electro house stabs, and scouse house-influenced bass lines, sometimes also including elements of acid house or psytrance. The genre is generally characterized by a standard 128 bpm, although in some cases up to 150 bpm. The term has been used to describe the 2012 to 2016 music of some DJ/producers, including Deorro, Joel Fletcher, Will Sparks, Vinai, and TJR. It is composed of bouncy offbeat bass, whiny vocal cut/saw lead, raucous horns, 8-bar snare fills before the drop. It often features a repetitive beat structure with some amount of build-ups and mild drops throughout. It started as a cross between elements, and underground Melbourne house/minimal style. Melbourne bounce gained popularity around mid to late 2012 and had a steady rise from 2013. In 2014, productions of Joel Fletcher, Will Sparks, and Uberjak'd were playing both domestically and internationally, and influencing the EDM style of Steve Aoki, TJR, and more.

== Further development ==
=== Jungle terror ===
Jungle terror is a music genre that developed in the 2010s. It is often described as a "chaotic" mix of house with grime and drum 'n' bass rhythms. There are also animal noises as well as vocal cuts and percussions. The Dutch DJ and music producer Wiwek is named as the founder of the genre, who made the style popular in the EDM scene between 2013 and 2016. Skrillex, Diplo and KURA are also associated with the genre.

=== Moombahton ===
Moombahton came as a mixture of slowed-down Dutch house and reggaeton. Its identifying characteristics include "a thick, spread-out bass line; some dramatic builds; and a two-step pulse, with quick drum fills", but it has "no real rules beyond working within a 108 bpm range." A portmanteau of "moombah" and "reggaeton", moombahton was created by DJ Dave Nada when he slowed down the tempo of the Afrojack remix of the Silvio Ecomo & Chuckie song "Moombah" to please party-goers with tastes in reggaeton. Other producers of the genre include Dillon Francis, Diplo and Munchi.

Moombahcore is a style of moombahton with elements of breakcore, dubstep, techstep and newstyle hardcore. Characteristics of the genre include chopped vocals, dubstep-influenced bass sounds and extensive build-ups. Artists who have produced moombahcore include Delta Heavy, Dillon Francis, Feed Me, Knife Party, and Noisia.

== See also ==
- List of electro house artists
- List of electronic music genres
- List of electronic dance music genres
