= Cross (Justice album) =

Studio album by Justice
- Released: 11 June 2007
- Recorded: 2005–2006
- Genre: Electro house
- Length: 48:13
- Labels: Ed Banger; Because
- Producers: Gaspard Augé; Xavier de Rosnay

Justice chronology
Cross (2007)	Planisphère (2008)

Singles from Cross
- 1. "Waters of Nazareth" Released: 14 September 2005; 2. "D.A.N.C.E." Released: 23 April 2007; 3. "Phantom Pt. II" Released: 26 November 2007; 4. "DVNO" Released: 19 May 2008; 5. "Tthhee Ppaarrttyy" Released: 9 February 2009

The untitled debut studio album by French electronic music duo Justice, commonly known as Cross (also titled † or Justice), (Note: While the album has been attributed many titles, Xavier de Rosnay confirmed the album is untitled, saying "People call it Cross but it doesn't have a title." According to NME, Justice requested magazines to refer to the album using the Latin cross symbol, but this is not consistently followed. This article uses Cross for consistency.) was first released on 11 June 2007 through Ed Banger Records and Because Music. Recorded during 2005 and 2006 in Paris, Cross was composed as an "opera-disco" album. It features many samples and "microsamples" throughout, with about 400 albums being used as sampled material. These include samples from Prince, Britney Spears and Madonna. The song "D.A.N.C.E." is a tribute to Michael Jackson. French musician Mehdi Pinson appears on "DVNO", and vocalist Uffie appears on "Tthhee Ppaarrttyy". The album was supported by the singles "Waters of Nazareth", "D.A.N.C.E.", "DVNO", "Phantom Pt. II", and "Tthhee Ppaarrttyy". A controversial music video was also released for "Stress".

Cross received critical acclaim and was a commercial success, reaching number 11 on the French albums chart and number one on the UK and US dance album charts. The album was nominated for Best Electronic/Dance Album and "D.A.N.C.E." was nominated for Best Dance Recording and Best Video at the 50th Annual Grammy Awards. Cross was later certified gold in the UK on 9 December 2011, for passing shipments of 100,000 copies. As of 2011, sales in the United States have exceeded 134,000 copies, according to Nielsen SoundScan. In 2012 it was awarded a diamond certification from the Independent Music Companies Association which indicated sales of at least 200,000 copies throughout Europe.

== Background and composition ==
Cross was recorded in Paris during 2005 and 2006. The concept for the album was for it to be an "opera-disco" album. Xavier de Rosnay stated about the opera disco concept:

We stuck to our original idea to make a 2007 opera-disco album, even if we are conscious that some tracks don't sound like proper disco at first listen. The best example is the song "Waters of Nazareth", which does not sound like disco when you listen to it for the first time. But if you forget that everything is distorted, the bass lines are just really basic disco patterns.

There are three credited samples present on the album: "You Make Me Wanna Wiggle" by The Brothers Johnson was sampled for "Newjack", "Tenebre (main theme)" by Simonetti-Morante-Pignatelli was sampled for "Phantom" and "Phantom Pt. II", and "Night on Disco Mountain" by David Shire was sampled for "Stress". And one uncredited sample: "Sunny" by Boney M which was sampled for "Phantom Pt. II", However, it also incorporates unrecognisable "microsamples" from hundreds of albums. De Rosnay stated:

We do sample really small bits of things that nobody can recognize. Say we use the "In Da Club" hand clap – not even 50 Cent would notice but if you listen to "Genesis", the first track [on Cross], there are samples of Slipknot, Queen and 50 Cent, but they are such short samples no one can recognize them. The ones from Slipknot, for example, are tiny pieces of vocals.

== Release and promotion ==
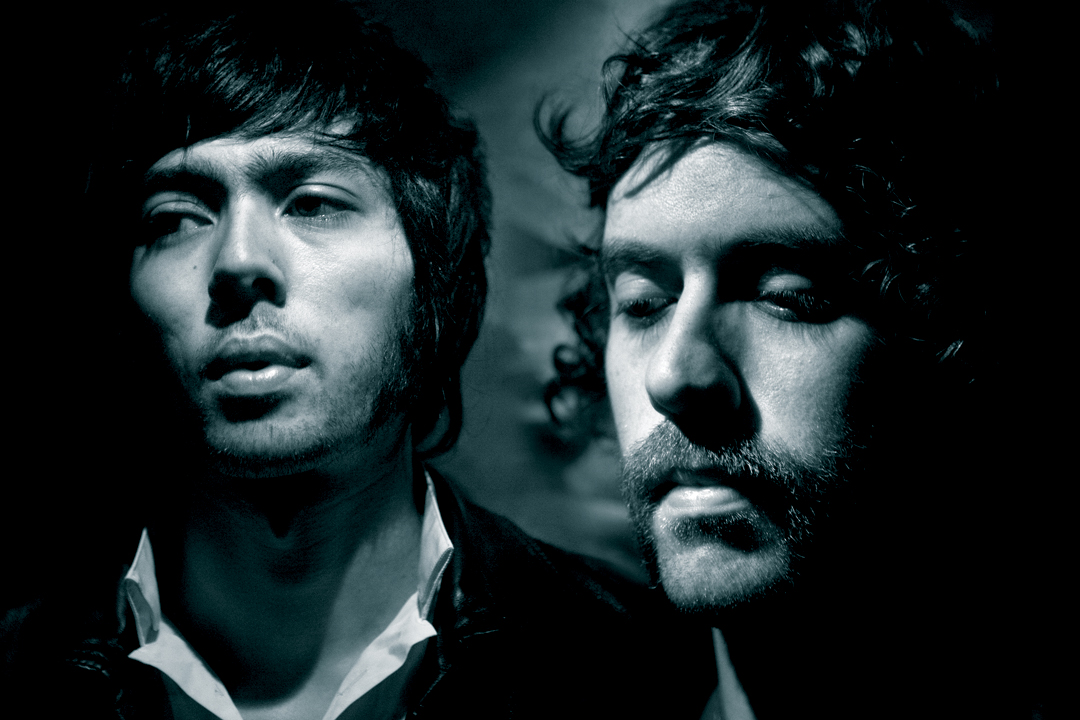
Justice in 2007

Cross was first released on 11 June 2007 through Ed Banger Records and Because Music globally as well as Downtown and Vice Records in the United States. Two songs were released as singles before the album's release. "Waters of Nazareth" was the first single released by the group in 2005 and featured "Let There Be Light" as its B-side. "D.A.N.C.E." was the second single from the album released on 23 April 2007. The single also featured the song "Phantom", which was also released on the Ed Rec Vol. 2 compilation album prior to the release of this album. "DVNO" and "Phantom Pt. II" released after and before the album's release, respectively.

The song "D.A.N.C.E." is about and dedicated to Michael Jackson. A music video for the track "Stress", directed by Romain Gavras, was released on 1 May 2008 through the website of rapper Kanye West. It was subject to heavy criticism upon release and received a ban from French television due to its violent content.

The cover art of the album is an homage to the packaging of the T. Rex album, Electric Warrior, designed by the English group Hipgnosis in 1971. It was created by So Me, the creative director of the album's publisher, Ed Banger Records, who said they attempted to "emulate the style [of Electric Warrior] ... the idea of an outline that fades into dots."

== Reception ==
Professional ratings
Aggregate scores
Source	Rating
Metacritic	81/100
Review scores
Source	Rating
AllMusic	4/5 stars
The A.V. Club	A−
Blender	4/5 stars
The Guardian	4/5 stars
The Irish Times	4/5 stars
NME	6/10
The Observer	5/5 stars
Pitchfork	8.4/10
Rolling Stone	3.5/5 stars
Uncut	4/5 stars

Cross was released to critical acclaim. On Metacritic, which assigns a weighted average score out of 100 to reviews and ratings from mainstream critics, the album received a metascore of 81 based on 25 reviews, which indicates "universal acclaim". Rob Sheffield of Rolling Stone stated that "with loads of melodrama and not a moment of subtlety, Justice define the new-jacques swing." Jess Harvell of Pitchfork called the album a "harsh and mostly instrumental set that nonetheless plays like the ideal crossover electronic-pop record", noting that "Justice knows how to sequence a dance album to avoid drag and boredom." Michaelangelo Matos of The A.V. Club described it as "an engaging study in contrasts and a killer party record." MSN Music critic Robert Christgau gave the album a rating indicating a "likable effort consumers attuned to its overriding aesthetic or individual vision may well enjoy," saying: "As dance music, not my idea of a good time, but as electronic pop, so much trickier, sillier and more kinetic than Kraftwerk."

At the 50th Grammy Awards, Cross was nominated for Best Electronic/Dance Album, while "D.A.N.C.E." was nominated for Best Dance Recording and Best Video. The album was also nominated for the 2007 Shortlist Prize, eventually losing out to The Reminder by Feist. Cross was ranked at second place by Planet Sound in their Best Albums of 2007 list. Pitchfork placed Cross at number 15 on their Top 50 Albums of 2007 list, as well as at number 107 on their list of the top 200 albums of the 2000s. Rolling Stone ranked it at number 24 on their list of the 30 Greatest EDM Albums of All Time. The album has been included in the book compilation 1001 Albums You Must Hear Before You Die.

== Legacy ==
In October 2020, EDM artist Zedd stated "if there was ever one album I would recommend combining production and musicality; it would be Justice's Cross. I still feel it sounds better than most electronic made today." In 2022, a 15th anniversary reissue of the album was released along with six bonus and formerly unreleased tracks. A digital D.A.N.C.E. EP was released alongside it, featuring remixes of the song.

== Track listing ==
All tracks are written by Gaspard Augé and Xavier de Rosnay unless noted.

Cross track listing
No.	Title	Writer(s)	Length
1.	"Genesis"		3:54
2.	"Let There Be Light"		4:55
3.	"D.A.N.C.E."	Gaspard Augé; Xavier de Rosnay; Jessie Chaton	4:02
4.	"Newjack"		3:36
5.	"Phantom"		4:22
6.	"Phantom Pt. II"		3:20
7.	"Valentine"		2:56
8.	"Tthhee Ppaarrttyy" (featuring vocals by Uffie)	Augé; Rosnay; Anna-Catherine Hartley; Fabien Pianta	4:03
9.	"DVNO" (featuring vocals by Mehdi Pinson)	Augé; Rosnay; Mehdi Pinson	3:56
10.	"Stress"		4:58
11.	"Waters of Nazareth"		4:25
12.	"One Minute to Midnight"		3:41
Total length:			48:13

Japanese edition bonus track
No.	Title	Length
13.	"D.A.N.C.E." (rehearsal version)	4:29
Total length:		52:42

Anniversary edition
No.	Title	Writer(s)	Length
13.	"Tthhee Ppaarrttyy" (demo; featuring vocals by Uffie)	Augé; Rosnay; Hartley; Pianta	3:33
14.	"Valentine" (demo)		2:20
15.	"D.A.N.C.E." (demo)	Augé; Rosnay; Chaton	4:06
16.	"Donna" (outtake)		3:02
17.	"B.E.A.T." (instrumental)		2:21
18.	"D.A.N.C.E." (Logic Reprise; featuring vocals by Logic)	Augé; Rosnay; Chaton	3:16
Total length:			66:51

== Chart performance ==
=== Weekly charts ===
Weekly chart performance for Cross
Chart (2007–2010)	Peak position
Australian Albums (ARIA)	61
Austrian Albums (Ö3 Austria)	71
Belgian Albums (Ultratop Flanders)	33
Belgian Alternative Albums (Ultratop Flanders)	21
Belgian Albums (Ultratop Wallonia)	29
Dutch Albums (Album Top 100)	77
Dutch Alternative Albums (MegaCharts)	12
French Albums (SNEP)	11
German Albums (Offizielle Top 100)	56
Irish Albums (IRMA)	60
Japanese Albums (Oricon)	43
Norwegian Albums (VG-lista)	25
Swiss Albums (Schweizer Hitparade)	36
UK Albums (Official Charts)	49
UK Dance Albums (Official Charts)	1
UK Independent Albums (Official Charts)	48
US Top Dance Albums (Billboard)	1

=== Year-end charts ===
2007 year-end chart performance for Cross
Chart (2007)	Position
French Albums (SNEP)	84
US Top Dance/Electronic Albums (Billboard)	24

2008 year-end chart performance for Cross
Chart (2008)	Position
US Top Dance/Electronic Albums (Billboard)	17

== Certifications ==
Certifications for Cross
Region	Certification	Certified units/sales
United Kingdom (BPI)	Gold	100,000^{^}
^{^} Shipments figures based on certification alone.
