= Audio, Video, Disco (song) =

Single by Justice

from the album Audio, Video, Disco
- B-side: "Helix"
- Released: 26 September 2011
- Recorded: 2010–11 in Paris, France
- Genre: Electro house; electronic rock; alternative dance
- Length: 4:52
- Label: Ed Banger; Because
- Songwriters: Gaspard Augé; Xavier de Rosnay
- Producer: Justice

Justice singles chronology
"Civilization'" (2011)	"Audio, Video, Disco" (2011)	"On'n'On" (2012)

Music video
- "Audio, Video, Disco" on YouTube

"Audio, Video, Disco" (Note: Stylised as "Audio, Video, Disco." (with a full stop)) is a song by French duo Justice. It is the title track and second single from their second studio album Audio, Video, Disco. The band stated that the album is not named after the song, instead the song is named after the album.

== Music video ==
The music video for "Audio, Video, Disco" was directed by So Me and released on 5 September 2011.

== Track listing ==
- Digital download EP
1. "Audio, Video, Disco." – 4:52
2. "Helix" – 4:31
3. "Audio, Video, Disco." (Para One Remix) – 6:16
4. "Audio, Video, Disco." (Mickey Moonlight Remix) – 4:50
- Vinyl
1. "Audio, Video, Disco" – 4:52
2. "Helix" – 4:31

== Charts ==
Chart (2011)	Peak position
Belgium (Ultratip Bubbling Under Flanders)	33
Belgium (Ultratip Bubbling Under Wallonia)	28
Japan Hot Overseas (Billboard)	9
UK Physical Singles Chart (Official Charts Company)	29
