= Civilization (Justice song) =

Single by Justice

from the album Audio, Video, Disco
- B-side: Demo (12")
- Released: 28 March 2011
- Recorded: 2010–11 in Paris, France
- Genre: Electroclash; nu-disco
- Length: 4:11
- Label: Ed Banger; Because
- Songwriters: Gaspard Augé; Xavier de Rosnay; Ali Love
- Producer: Justice

Justice singles chronology
"TThhEe PPaARRtTYY" (2009)	"Civilization" (2011)	"Audio, Video, Disco" (2011)

Music video
- "Civilization" on YouTube

"Civilization" is a single by the French band Justice and the first from their second studio album Audio, Video, Disco. The single, Justice's first via Elektra Records, was initially set to be released on iTunes on 4 April 2011, before becoming available on other digital retailers on April 11. The track was released early through iTunes France on 28 March and globally through iTunes on 29 March 2011.

The track features vocals from British singer Ali Love. The song was previewed in a two-minute advertisement for Adidas, which was directed by Romain Gavras and later as opening theme of Eurosport's coverage MCE Insurance British Superbikes in 2011 to 2012. Gavras has worked with Justice previously, directing the music video for their song "Stress" in 2008, and filming a documentary 'A Cross In The Universe' about Justice's American tour in 2008. The single was re-released on 6 June with remixes from Mr. Oizo and The Fucking Champs.

== Critical reception ==
Eric Magnuson of Rolling Stone gave the single a rating of three-and-a-half stars out of five, complimenting its "high-end baguette beat-down". He compared the song to a mix of Daft Punk's "Aerodynamic" and The Who's "Baba O'Riley". Ben Gilbert of Yahoo! Music UK & Ireland gave a positive review, calling the song "fried and fiercesome [sic]".

== Composition ==
Civilization is in the common time of 4/4. It is played at a tempo of 90 BPM, with a change to 112 BPM on the 17th measure. It is in the key of A minor.

== Music video ==
The music video was created by French director Edouard Salier and features a very symbolic portrayal of iconic statues and structures falling after the world upturns—presumably—killing all the buffalo. The clip was produced using a labor-intensive combination of CGI and 3D animation. It was nominated for the 2011 MTV Europe Music Award for Best Video.

== Track listing ==
- Single sided 12" single
1. "Civilization" – 4:11
2. "Civilization" (demo) – 3:45
- Digital download single
1. "Civilization" – 4:11
- Digital download EP
1. "Civilization" – 4:10
2. "Civilization" (demo version) – 3:38
3. "Civilization" (Mr. Oizo Remix) – 3:31
4. "Civilization" (The Fucking Champs Remix) – 4:42
5. "Civilization" (video)

== Charts ==
Chart (2011)	Peak position
Belgium (Ultratip Bubbling Under Flanders)	7
Belgium (Ultratop 50 Wallonia)	29
Canada (Canadian Hot 100)	83
France (SNEP)	5
Netherlands (Single Top 100)	58
Spain (Promusicae)	30
UK Dance (Official Charts)	9
UK Singles (Official Charts)	53
