= Stress (song) =

Song by Justice

from the album †
- Released: 11 June 2007
- Recorded: 2005–2006 in Paris
- Genre: Electro house
- Length: 4:59
- Label: Ed Banger; Because
- Songwriter(s): Gaspard Augé; Xavier de Rosnay
- Producer(s): Gaspard Augé; Xavier de Rosnay

"Stress" is a song by French electronic music duo Justice, the tenth track on their debut studio album †. (Note: While the album has been attributed many titles, including Cross and Justice, Xavier de Rosnay has stated the album is untitled. Justice has also stated the Latin cross symbol is preferred when referring to the album.) A music video for the song, directed by Romain Gavras, was released on 1 May 2008 through the website of American rapper Kanye West. The video, which was subject to severe criticism, is notable for its extremely controversial content, which includes scenes of young teenagers committing acts of gang violence across Paris. The song itself received positive reviews from critics.

== Composition ==
"Stress" is an electro house song that lasts a duration of four minutes and fifty-nine seconds. The track contains samples of a disco version of Modest Mussorgsky's Night on Bald Mountain called "Night on Disco Mountain" by David Shire as well as a brief sample from the 1976 short film The Truth About De-Evolution by American new wave band Devo. In a Maxim interview, Xavier de Rosnay of Justice commented that the song was mixed in such a way that it could be an unpleasant listen and "almost give you a headache."

== Critical reception ==
Despite the criticism and controversy surrounding its accompanying music video, the song itself received positive reviews from critics. Thomas Gorton of Dazed called "Stress" a "brilliant tune". Sarah Boden labeled the song as a highlight from Cross, saying that the song "may be the most claustrophobic club pounder you've ever encountered," and that "its piercing, incessant strings are married to a shuffling beat; think Psycho's Norman Bates doing the moonwalk." Evan Sawdey of PopMatters compared the song's horror and Halloween-esque style to that of Michael Jackson's "Thriller" and commented that "'Stress' opens like a double-time horror movie theme, all stabbing strings and John Carpenter undertones slowly co-existing before transforming into a Halloween party ass-shaker of the highest order".

== Music video ==
The film was never intended as a stigmatisation of the banlieue, nor an incitation to violence, nor above all, as an underhanded way to deliver a racist message. From the beginning, Stress was meant to be a clip unairable on television for a track unairable on the radio and we have refused any television broadcast of the clip, so as to impose it on no one.

— Justice

The music video for "Stress" was originally uploaded to the website of American rapper Kanye West on 1 May 2008. It was uploaded to YouTube shortly afterwards. Lasting nearly seven minutes, it was directed by Romain Gavras and shot in 16mm film in Paris.

The video is centered on young, mostly black Parisian teenagers who go about the city and commit acts of gang violence; de Rosnay himself described the video as "seven minutes of pure violence in a way people are not used to seeing". During the video, they violently harass civilians in public, vandalize property, and also jack a vehicle and set it ablaze afterward.

=== Reception ===
The video received heavy criticism, resulting in immediate backlash from the public and a ban from French television. The video was criticized as racist. In response to this criticism, Gaspard Augé of Justice said "We were expecting some fuss obviously, but definitely not on those topics... If people see racism in the video, it's definitely because they might have a problem with racism; because all they see is black people beating up white people, which is not what's happening in the video."

In an interview with Fact in 2016, de Rosnay noted that the National Front and anti-racist organizations both threatened to sue the duo over the video after its release. The video was named as one of the most controversial music videos of all time by both Dazed and NME. Daniel Kreps of Rolling Stone compared the video to events of the Grand Theft Auto video game series, which is notable for containing events of violence similar to the ones in the music video for "Stress". Jeffrey T. Iverson of Time also compared the video to the films La Haine, Man Bites Dog, and A Clockwork Orange, all of which feature similar events of violence as well. Complex was less critical of the music video and awarded it the number 2 spot on their "100 Best Music Videos of the 2000s" list, commenting that "the images are so arresting that you can't look away for even a second."

== Usage in media ==
The song was later featured on the soundtrack for the video game NBA 2K13, which was curated by American rapper Jay-Z. It would be later be added to Grand Theft Auto Online to the radio station MOTOMAMI Los Santos, curated by Spanish singer Rosalía, as part of the DLC The Contract in 2021. It was also heard in the trailer for the fourth season of Rick and Morty, along with Genesis, another track from †.
