= DVNO =

2007 song by Justice

Single by Justice

from the album †
- Released: 19 May 2008
- Genre: Electro house; nu-disco
- Length: 3:56
- Label: Ed Banger; Because
- Songwriters: Mehdi Pinson; Gaspard Augé; Xavier de Rosnay
- Producer: Justice

Justice singles chronology
"Phantom Pt. II" (2007)	"DVNO" (2008)	"TtHhEe PpAaRrTtYy" (2009)

Music video
- "DVNO" on YouTube

"DVNO" is a song by French electronic music duo Justice from their debut album Cross. The song was released on 19 May 2008 in the United Kingdom. The song was added to Radio 1's B List playlist.

== Background ==
The vocalist featured in the song is Mehdi Pinson from the band Scenario Rock, under the pseudonym of DVNO. According to Xavier de Rosnay, the title of the song stands for "Divino", which refers to "In every suburb of the world, in every city, there’s always a nightclub called El Divino... Clubs where you have to wear a white shirt to get in."

== Music video ==
Directed by So-Me, Yorgo Tloupas, and Machine Molle, the music video is a highly stylized partial lyric video, featuring portions of the song's lyrics in the form of famous animated company logo graphics from the era of Scanimate and early CGI. Notable featured company logos are those of Channel 4, NBC, PBS, HBO, Sony, Sega, Cannon Films, 20th Century Fox, CBS/Fox Video, and Universal Pictures, including that of sister company Universal Parks & Resorts. The final animation segment pays homage to Cannell Entertainment's production logo, with duo members Xavier de Rosnay and Gaspard Augé making an appearance.

== Appearances in film and television ==
The song was featured in the 2007 film Hitman directed by Xavier Gens. The song was also used in a commercial for the Discovery Channel in 2007, and featured as a "Web Obsession of the Week" in the edition of 14 March 2008 of Entertainment Weekly.

== Track listing ==
12" single

1. "DVNO" (Justice Remix)
2. "DVNO" (Surkin Remix)
3. "DVNO" (Sunshine Brothers Mix)
4. "DVNO" (LA Riots Remix)
5. "DVNO" (Les Petits Pilous Remix)

== Charts ==
Chart (2008)	Peak position
Belgium (Ultratip Bubbling Under Flanders)	23
France (SNEP)	94
