= Justice (band) =

French electronic music duo

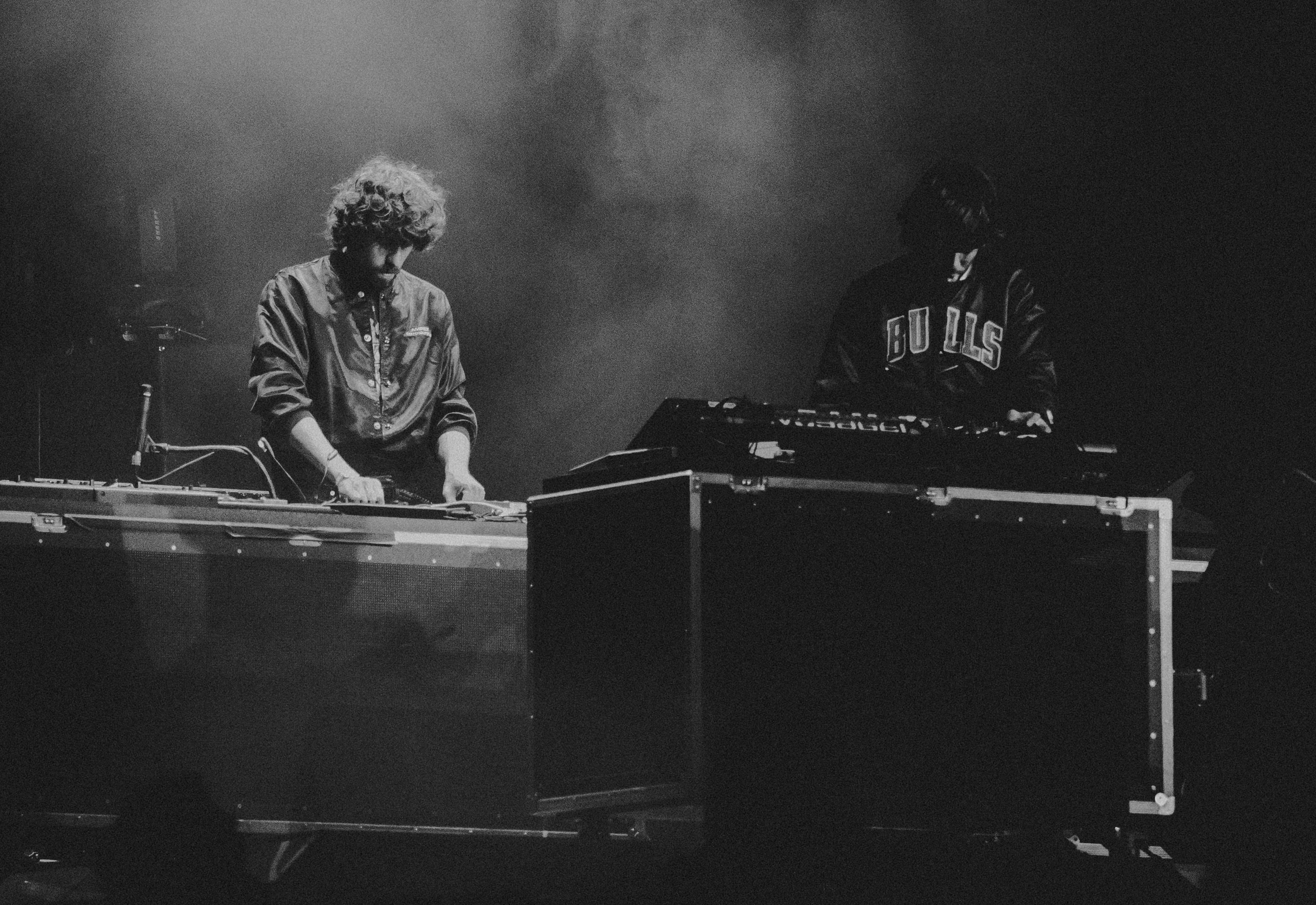
- Gaspard Augé and Xavier de Rosnay performing live in 2017

Background information
- Origin: Paris, France
- Genres: Electro house; French house; electronic rock; nu-disco; electroclash
- Works: Discography
- Years active: 2003–present
- Labels: Because; Ed Banger; Elektra; Downtown; Big Beat; Atlantic
- Members: Gaspard Augé; Xavier de Rosnay
- Website: justice.church

Justice are a French electronic music duo from Paris consisting of Gaspard Augé and Xavier de Rosnay. They are known for incorporating strong rock and disco influences into their music and image.

The band's debut album Cross was released in June 2007. The album was later nominated for a Grammy Award for Best Electronic/Dance Album and came in at number 15 on Pitchfork's "Top 50 Albums of 2007" and number 18 on Blender's "25 Best Albums of 2007" list. It was nominated for the 2007 Shortlist Music Prize, losing out to The Reminder by Feist. The band's remix of the MGMT song "Electric Feel" won the Grammy Award for Best Remixed Recording, Non-Classical in 2009.

In September 2009, it was announced that Justice would be moving to WMG/Atlantic's newly relaunched Elektra Records label. The band reportedly started to work on its second album in mid-2010. The first single, "Civilization", was released on 28 March 2011. The band released its second album, Audio, Video, Disco, on 24 October 2011. This was followed by the live album on 7 May 2013, titled Access All Arenas. Justice announced their third album, Woman, through their Facebook page, and it was released on 18 November 2016. The band won the Grammy Award for Best Electronic/Dance Album in 2019 for their remix album Woman Worldwide.

After a hiatus of seven years, Justice released its fourth album Hyperdrama on 26 April 2024. The record was nominated for the 67th Grammy Awards for Best Electronic/Dance Album, with the single "Neverender" featuring Tame Impala winning Best Electronic/Dance Recording. The duo collaborated with the Weeknd on the song "Wake Me Up", which serves as the opening track from the latter's sixth studio album, Hurry Up Tomorrow (2025). In October 2026, Rockstar Games announced that the duo composed the original score for the video game Grand Theft Auto VI.

== History ==
=== Early works, remixes, and signing with Ed Banger (2003–2006) ===
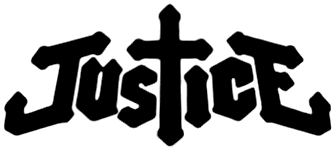
The band's "cross" logo

Justice first produced tracks together for Musclorvision's "Hits Up to You", a concept compilation where tracks were designed to sound like they were meant for the Eurovision song contest. The compilation included two of their songs, and a track by Augé's alter-ego Microloisir. Justice first came to prominence through its 2003 remix of Simian's track "Never Be Alone", created for a Paris college radio station's remix contest. The remix resulted in the group being signed to Ed Banger (who released it) and became a hit in clubs and on the Internet. The song was re-released in 2004 on DJ Hell's International DeeJay Gigolo Records and eventually given a commercial release in the UK in the summer of 2006 under the title "We Are Your Friends" on Ten Records, a sub-label of Virgin Records.

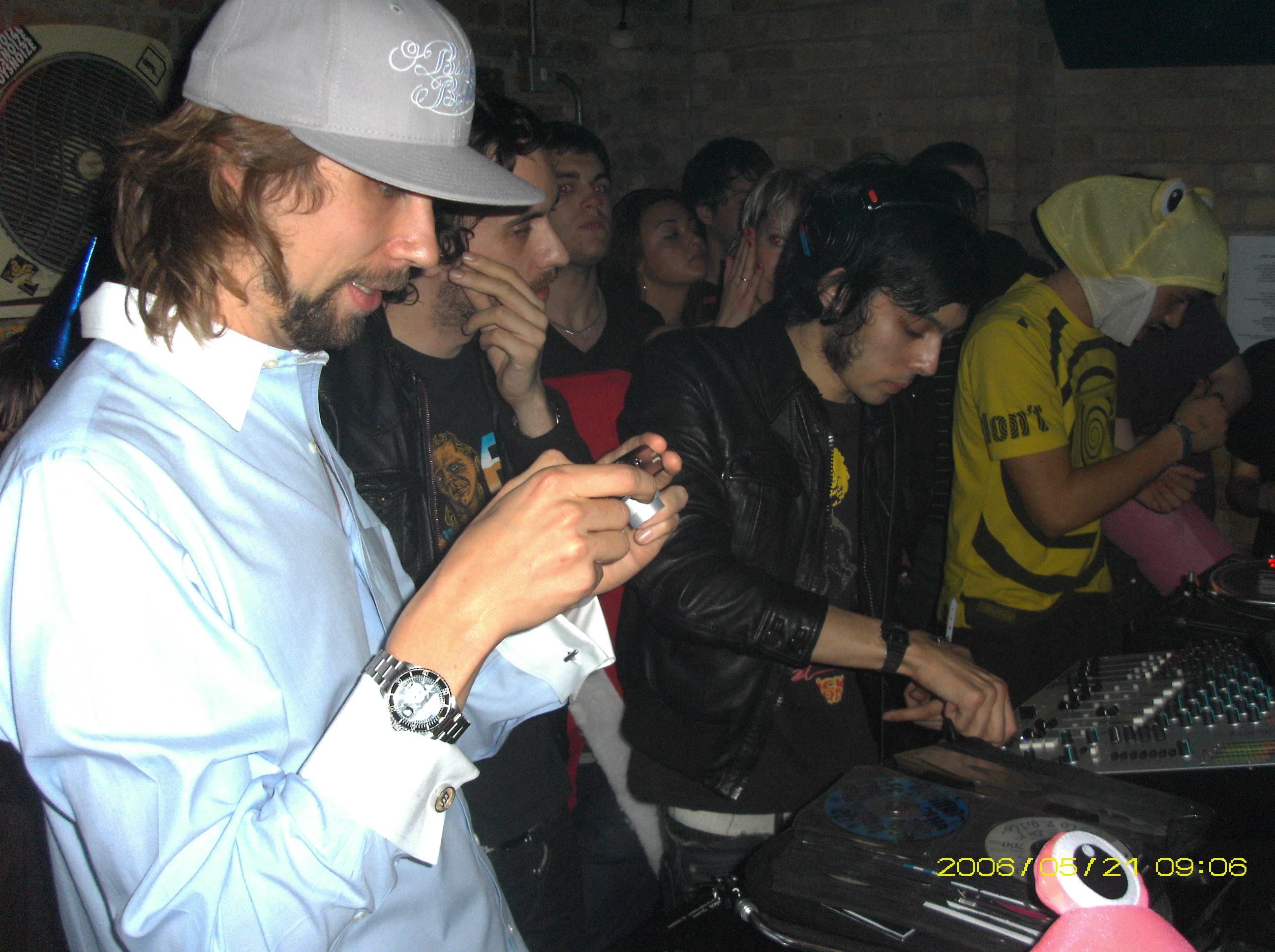
Busy P (left) with Justice at Fabric in 2006

After the original release of "We Are Your Friends", Justice worked on remixes for a number of French groups (Vicarious Bliss, Scenario Rock, and Gambit) as well as for larger mainstream acts such as Britney Spears, N*E*R*D, Fatboy Slim, and Daft Punk. Justice's first solo single, "Waters of Nazareth", was released on Ed Banger Records in September 2005 and was championed by DJs such as Erol Alkan, Eddy Temple-Morris, Tiga, 2 Many DJ's, and Ivan Smagghe. The track was re-released in 2006 with additional remixes. The duo's prolific remix work continued, turning in mixes for Franz Ferdinand, Mystery Jets, Soulwax, and Mr. Oizo. Justice won the award for Best Video at the MTV Europe Music Awards 2006 for Justice vs. Simian – "We Are Your Friends". Augé and de Rosnay were not present at the ceremony, and the award was accepted by label art director "So Me" and video director Jérémie Rozan.

=== Cross and rise to fame (2007–2010) ===
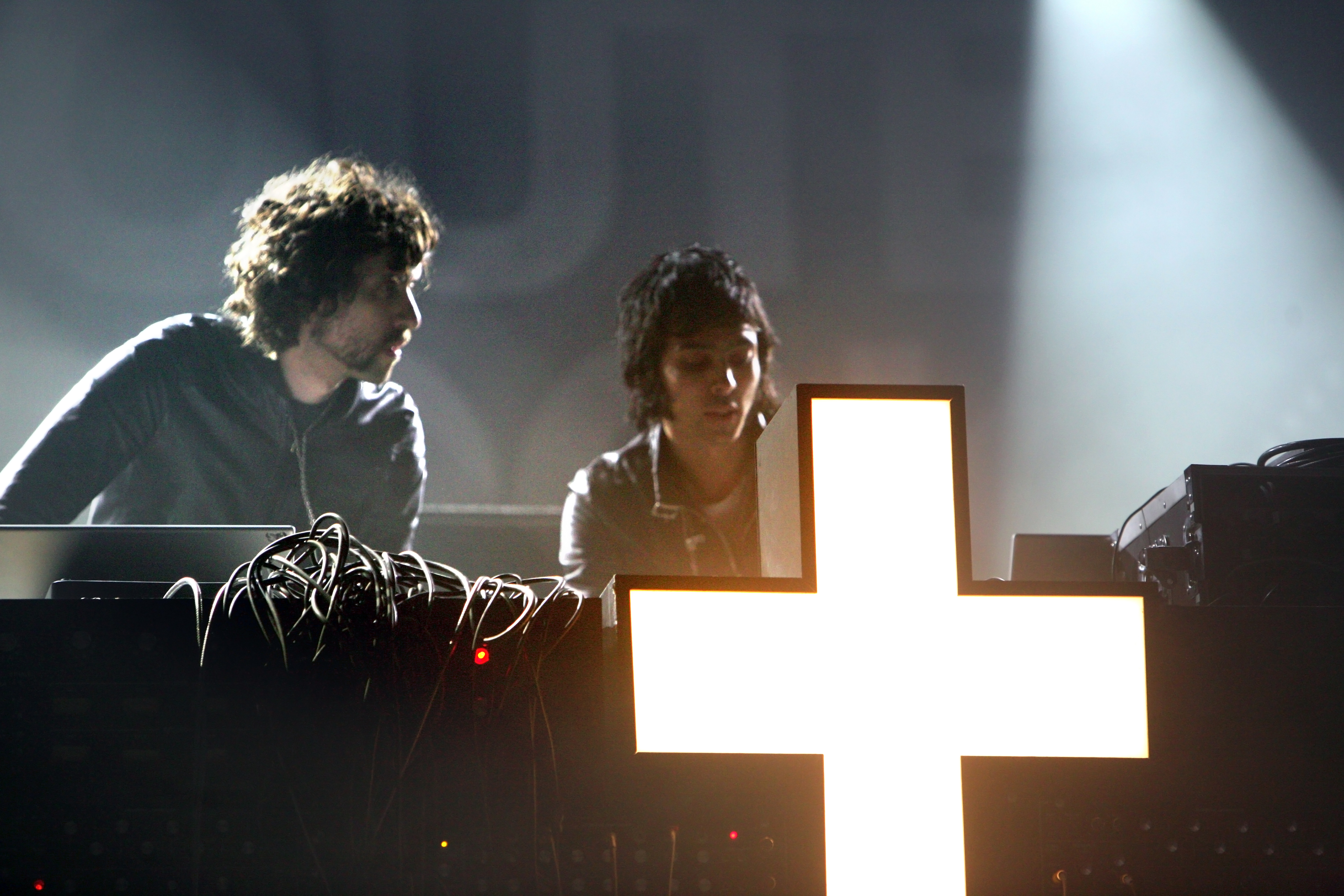
Gaspard Augé and Xavier de Rosnay performing at La Route du Rock in August 2007

Justice's debut album, titled Cross, was released on Ed Banger Records on 11 June 2007. The album was released in the United States on Downtown/Ed Banger. The album was preceded by the D.A.N.C.E. EP, released on 28 May 2007, which featured the tracks "Phantom" and the band's own remix of "D.A.N.C.E.", titled "B.E.A.T". "D.A.N.C.E." was nominated for "Video of the Year" at the 2007 MTV Video Music Awards. On 1 November, Justice received the "Video Star" award at the European Music Awards in Munich and was named the Best French Act of the Year. Justice was chosen to do a mix for the Fabriclive series in 2008, but Fabric rejected it. De Rosnay said, "They weren't ready for something like this." Now titled "Justice Xmas Mix", the mix is available on the Internet.

Justice appeared as a Live PA at the 2007 Parklife and festivals around Australia, the 2008 Coachella festival; the 2007 and 2008 Sónar festival in Barcelona; Fuji Rock Festival in Niigata, Japan; the Hultsfred Festival in Hultsfred, Sweden; the Oxegen festival in Kildare, Ireland; the T in the Park festival in Kinross, Scotland; the Reading and Leeds Festivals in England; the Vieilles Charrues Festival in Carhaix, France; the Roskilde Festival in Roskilde, Denmark; Pukkelpop in Belgium, at the "I LOVE TECHNO" festival in Ghent, Belgium; Dour Festival in Belgium; Rock Werchter in Belgium; the Lowlands festival and the Pinkpop festival in The Netherlands; at Tennents Vital in the Radio One Tent in Belfast; at the Phoenix Park Marquee in Dublin; and at the Festival Internacional de Benicàssim in Spain.

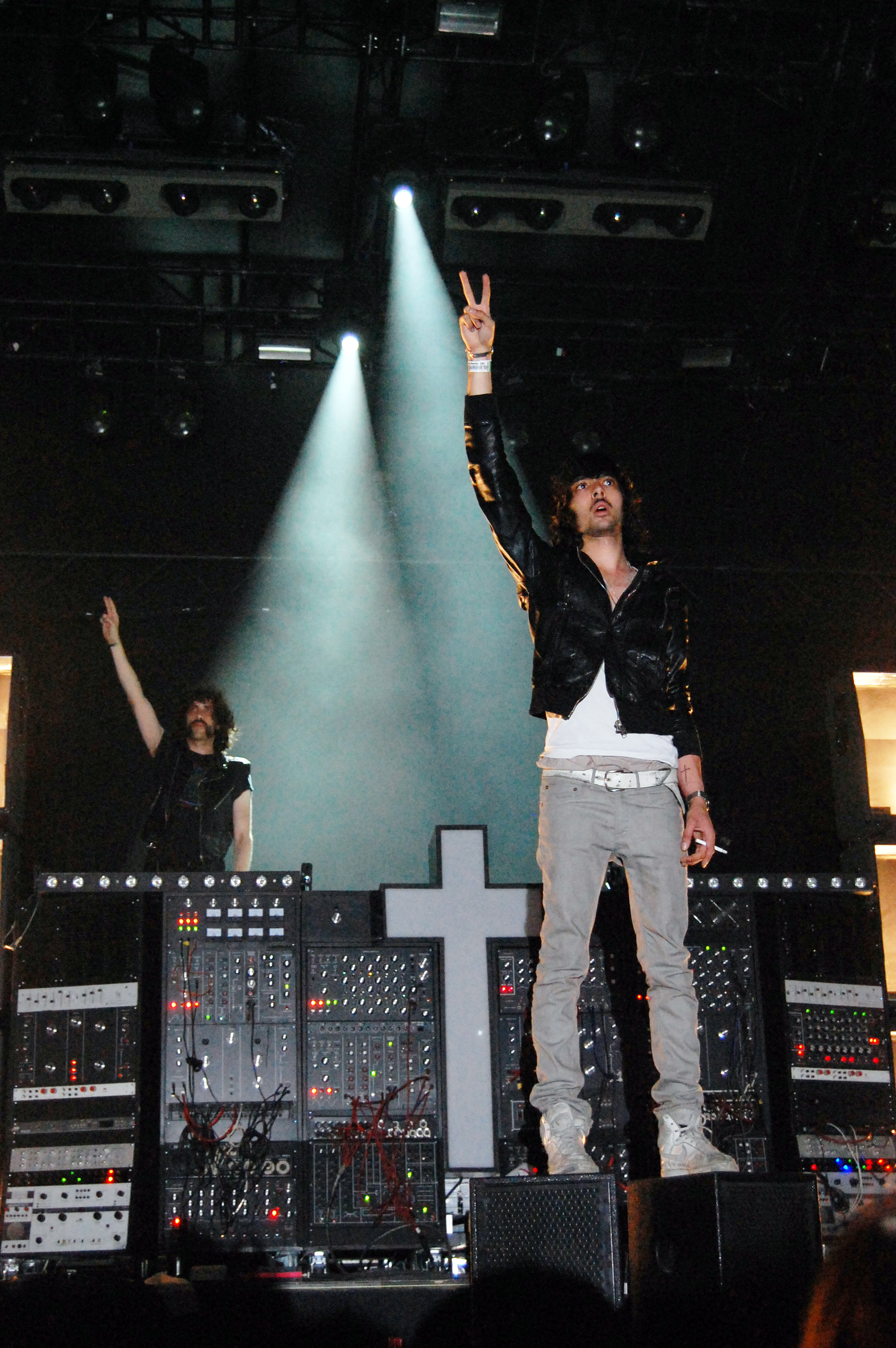
Justice at Rock Werchter 2008

Justice was nominated for Best Dance Recording (for "D.A.N.C.E.") and Best Electronic/Dance Album (for Cross) at the 50th Grammy Awards. Justice released their music video for "Stress" on 1 May 2008. The clip features a group of youths committing acts of vandalism and harassment, wearing jackets bearing the Justice cross on the back. Accused in some quarters of racism for its stereotypical depiction of youths of African descent (black and North African) from Paris' socially deprived banlieues (outer suburbs), others saw the video as a critique of the portrayal of blacks in the French media. Speaking in an interview with The Quietus, Augé said, "We were expecting some fuss obviously, but definitely not on those topics... If people see racism in the video, it's definitely because they might have a problem with racism; because they only see black people beating up white people, which is not what happens."

In a 2005 interview with Dummy, Justice said it wanted a strong concept for each record it put out, and with this one, the duo wanted to keep people guessing. Asked in an interview whether their cross-based themes had received any negative feedback, De Rosnay said, "Eighty percent of France is Christian. My dad was a bit uncertain and thought it was bad taste, but I was like, This is what I want to do dad. It's odd because in America we have received support from Christian groups thanking us for spreading the word. We do not invert the cross and I suppose they think we look like nice guys so there has not been a problem."

On 1 June 2008, The Sun announced that Justice was chosen by Anthony Kiedis of the Red Hot Chili Peppers to produce the band's follow up to Stadium Arcadium, but this was quickly corrected by Ed Banger manager Pedro Winter, as Anthony Kiedis had only stated he was a fan of Justice, not preparing for a collaboration. In July 2008, Justice was revealed to have done a mix for the Dior Homme Summer 2009 Fashion Show, much like Daft Punk did for Louis Vuitton in 2007. The track, now known as Planisphère, was released in four parts on the band's MySpace page. The four parts were officially released on streaming services in 2022, with a physical vinyl release.

On 25 August 2008, the band announced via MySpace that its next major release would be a DVD documentary/concert film titled A Cross the Universe. The announcement was also tied to an invitation for fans to email photos, images, and artwork to an address, so the received photos could be compiled for use as artwork for the release. An iconic scene in A Cross The Universe takes place in Las Vegas, where, as a homage to US hard rock singer Axl Rose, Gaspard marries a groupie he met three hours earlier. During a DJ tour for the release of A Cross the Universe in November 2008, controversy arose when a photograph of Augé DJing with an unplugged Akai Professional MPD24 surfaced. The photograph sparked accusations that Justice's live sets were faked. Augé has since said that the equipment was unplugged for only a brief moment before being reattached, and the band posted a three-photo set of the incident on their MySpace page.

Justice played 2009 New Year's Eve in Chicago at the Congress Theater to a crowd of 4,000 people. Augé was later seen at an after-party thrown in honor of the band, featuring various local DJs, artists, and photographers. In January 2009, French group Birdy Nam Nam released its album "Manual for Successful Rioting", for which Justice produced the last song on the album, "The Parachute Ending". The band's remix of MGMT's "Electric Feel" won a Grammy Award for Best Remixed Recording, Non-Classical in 2009.

In the November 2009 issue of Mixmag, Justice stated that it would be working on the soundtrack for Mr. Oizo's upcoming film, Rubber, saying they had to "finish working on the soundtrack for Mr. Oizo's new film before we start recording for the new album." In April 2009, the music website Stereogum hosted a remix by the duo of U2's song "Get on Your Boots", the lead single from the band's most recent album No Line on the Horizon. Their remix of Lenny Kravitz's song "Let Love Rule" was also featured on Kanye West's blog. They played at the 2009 Voodoo Experience in New Orleans, as well as at the HARD Haunted Mansion in LA over the Halloween weekend.

=== Audio, Video, Disco (2011–2014) ===
On 14 March 2011, the duo announced via its Facebook page plans to release a new single entitled "Civilization" on 4 April. It was released on Ed Banger and Because Records and was the first single off of its second LP. The song has also been featured as the soundtrack to a new Adidas campaign spearheaded by French director Romain Gavras, with whom Justice has worked in the past.

On 28 March 2011, the Justice single, "Civilization" was released as a one-week iTunes exclusive, in full, as a premier for the release of the single on 4 April. On 27 May, the duo released the official music video for the single on YouTube. The video relies heavily on CGI and illustrates a world in which famous monuments (such as the Christ the Redeemer monument in Rio de Janeiro) are destroyed as gravity appears to be reversed. The storyline is of a herd of bison running from the falling ruins.

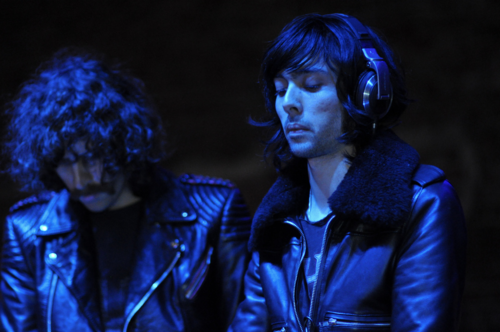
Justice performing in October 2011

In August 2011, the band announced that its second record, Audio, Video, Disco, would be released 24 October 2011. In an interview with French magazine Tsugi, the duo disclosed the 11 song track list of the album, and described it as "a progressive rock record, played by guys that don't know how to play". Around this time label owner and manager Busy P played unreleased material from the album in his shows.

On 6 September 2011, the duo released a music video for the single "Audio, Video, Disco" via their Facebook page. The video features Xavier and Gaspard in a studio setting and details the lengthy, rock'n'roll-style recording process they experienced while making the single and album. In the clip, various instruments are seen, such as an electric guitar, a piano, and a drum kit, which serve as the quite literal symbols of the Justice progression into a more rocky, less electronic sound. Several songs from this album have been used in the second series of the Channel 4 comedy Cardinal Burns.

In March 2012, the band played the main stage at Ultra Music Festival in Miami, Florida. The duo played many of its hits from their debut album Cross, as well as many of the new tracks off of Audio, Video, Disco. In April 2012, Justice was also a headlining act at Coachella Valley Music Festival in Indio, California. Justice headlined at Montreal's Osheaga on 3 August 2012 and Chicago's Lollapalooza on Sunday, 5 August. Justice also played at San Francisco's Outside Lands Music Festival on Friday, 10 August. In October 2012, the band played at Voodoo Experience in New Orleans, Louisiana. Justice completed its world tour of the live show on 10 November 2012, playing at One Festival in Mexico City, Mexico.

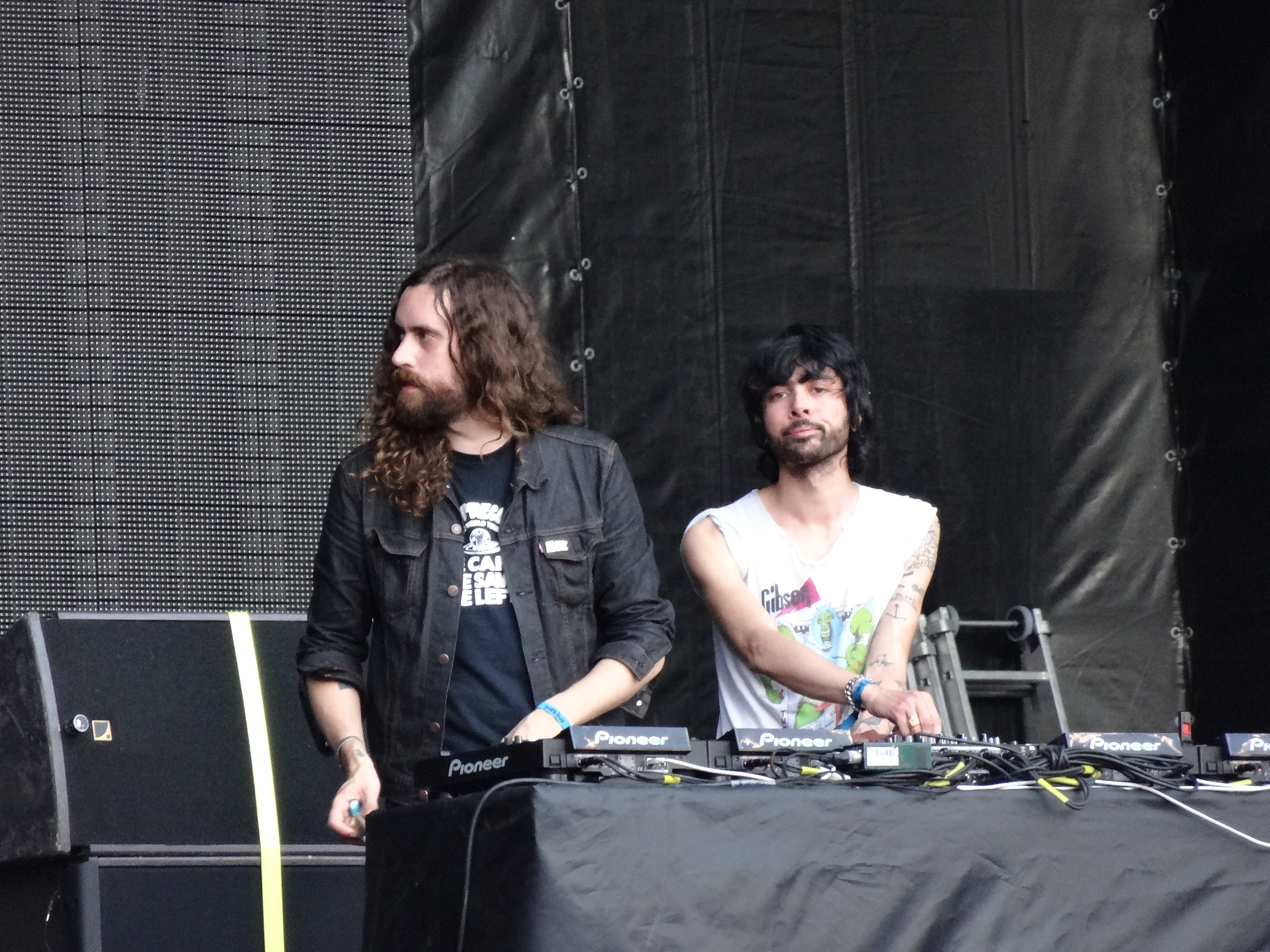
Justice at Park Live Festival in June 2013

On 7 May 2013, the band released its second live album, Access All Arenas, which was recorded at the Arena of Nîmes in France on 19 July 2012.

=== Woman (2014–2024) ===
On 22 June 2014, the band announced that they had started working on a third album. On 12 April 2016, Because Music revealed that Justice was in the process of signing record release documents. On 18 June 2016, a new single was revealed titled "Safe and Sound" at the Ed Banger House Party at the Sónar 2016 Music Festival. The track's name and its cover art were revealed through Shazam. The track was released for download on 13 July 2016. On 13 September 2016, Justice revealed on their Facebook page that their third album would be titled Woman.

On 14 September 2016, Justice released the album's second single, titled "Randy", through their Facebook page. Shortly after, Justice announced on their Facebook page that Woman was available for pre-order via iTunes. On 18 November 2016, Woman was released through Ed Banger Records and Because Music.

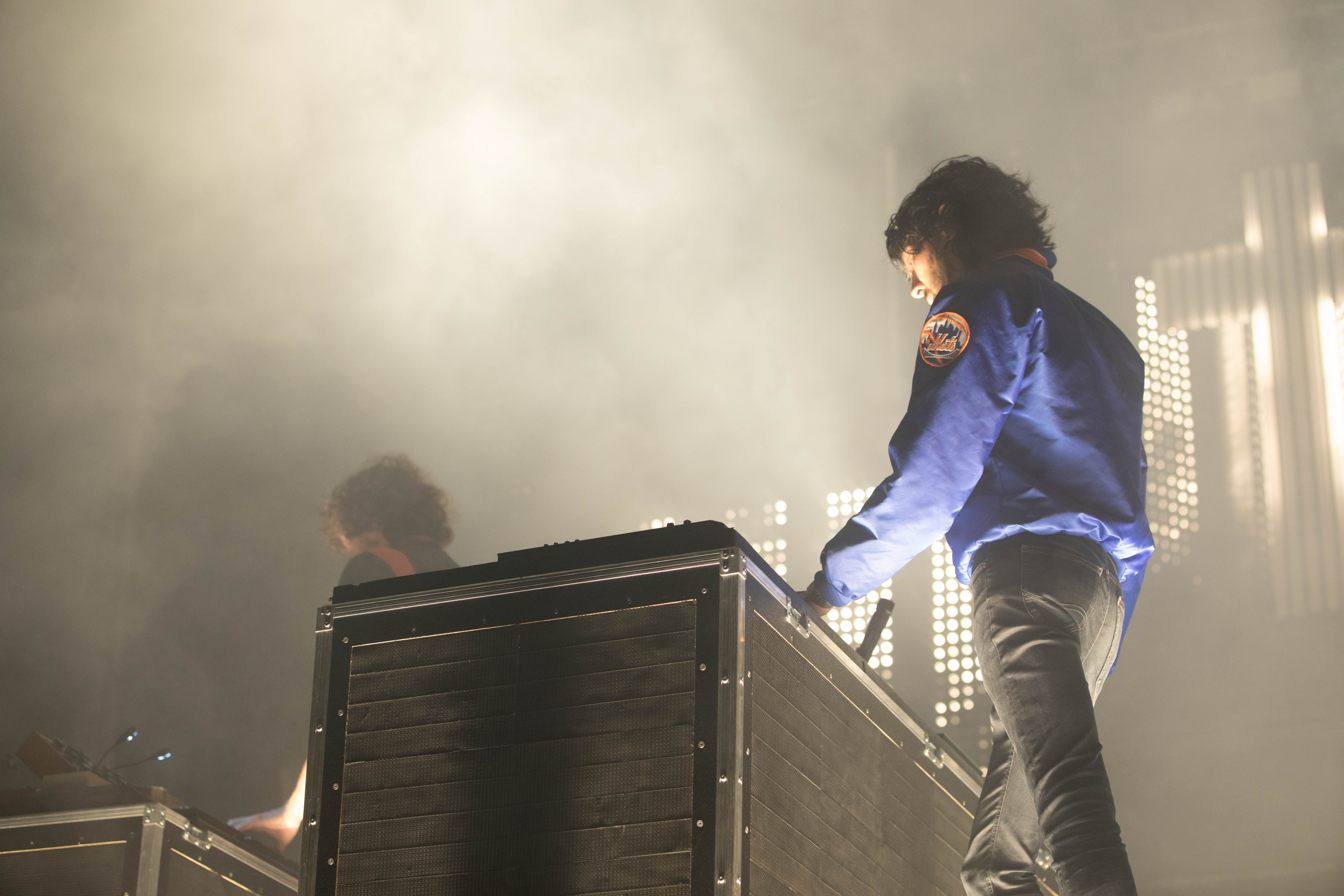
Justice in Sydney on 24 February 2018

On 10 May 2018, Justice announced the release of a remix album, Woman Worldwide, on 24 August 2018 after their performance at the Google I/O conference in California. The album comprises new reworks of songs from their back catalog, which were initially played and reinterpreted during their live performances.

On 28 September 2018, Justice announced that they would be playing their "last live show for [the] tour and for [the] decade" at the HARD Day of the Dead Festival in California via their Instagram.

Gaspard Augé released his debut solo album, Escapades, on 25 June 2021.

On 18 March 2021, the duo sent a cease and desist letter to Justin Bieber over the album, Justice, citing willful trademark infringement over the "cross" logo.

On 15 December 2022, Justice released the fifteenth-anniversary edition of Cross, including six new tracks between remixes and demos.

=== Hyperdrama and Grand Theft Auto VI score (2024–present) ===
Justice at We Love Green, 2024

On 12 June 2023, Pedro Winter confirmed that Justice would release a fourth studio album in the spring of 2024.

On 29 December 2023, Madeon played an unreleased song from Justice's upcoming album on his DJ set in Nashville. On 1 January 2024, the duo uploaded a teaser of a new song on their social media handles. On 17 January 2024, Justice uploaded another teaser, a collaboration with Tame Impala, titled "One Night/All Night".

On 18 January 2024, Justice revealed through their Instagram that the album is titled Hyperdrama. On 24 January 2024, Justice released two tracks from the album, "One Night/All Night" (featuring Tame Impala) and "Generator". The duo also announced that Hyperdrama would release on 26 April. The third single, "Incognito", was released on 6 March 2024. The fourth single, "Saturnine", featuring Miguel, was released on 20 March 2024. The album was released in Dolby Atmos format on Apple Music and Tidal.

Justice went on a world tour to support the album, starting with a performance at Coachella in April 2024. Hyperdrama was later nominated for the 67th Grammy Awards for Best Electronic/Dance Album, and the single "Neverender" featuring Tame Impala won the award for Best Electronic/Dance Recording.

On 31 January 2025, The Weeknd's album Hurry Up Tomorrow was released with "Wake Me Up", co-produced by Justice, as its opening track. The track was teased previously in the summer on The Weeknd's social media.

On 15 October 2026, Rockstar Games revealed that Justice composed the original score for Grand Theft Auto VI. The announcement included a launch trailer for the video game with the release of a new single "Flower in a Hurricane", featuring SZA, Tame Impala, and King Gizzard & the Lizard Wizard. Another single, "Pusher", featuring Gesaffelstein, was released on 29 October 2026, along with the announcement that the game's score would be released on 11 December 2026.

== Musical style and equipment ==
Apart from the disco and funk influences of electro house, Justice's style has some heavy metal influence. Justice combines cut-up or slapped basslines with compressed and distorted synth sounds.

Each of the studio albums have had an accompanying live tour, with each having its own unique live equipment setup. The equipment has changed from tour to tour, but has remained centered on Ableton Live.

=== A Cross the Universe Tour ===
Production equipment:

- an Apogee Ensemble Recording Interface
- a Power Mac G5 computer
- Cubase and GarageBand

Live equipment:

- a Korg RADIAS
- three JazzMutant Lemur Input Devices,
- two MacBook Pros running Ableton Live
- a Korg MicroKorg
- an AKAI MPD24
- a Korg ZERO8
- a Moog Minimoog Voyager
- a Pioneer DJM800.

On each side of the stage were nine stacked Marshall cabinet fronts, non-functional modular synthesizer props. The cabinet stacks are another non-functional prop that serves as stage dressing. Their DJ setup previously included two Pioneer CDJ-1000MK3s and a Pioneer DJM800, but since the A Cross the Universe release tour, Justice have been using Ableton Live controlled by an AKAI MPD24 and a Pioneer DJM800 for their DJ sets.

=== Access All Arenas Tour ===
On the Access All Arenas tour, which accompanied the release of Audio, Video, Disco, Justice's live setup expanded to make use of more intricate lighting effects. The addition of this new set lighting was made with the artistic constraint that no video screens be used. The lighting involved a stripped-down, bold use of basic colors, so as to distract minimally from musical performance itself.

The audio equipment was also stripped down to an Ableton Live console, multiple Pioneer DJM800s for the mixing suite on-stage, a Minimoog Voyager, and a minimal number of other MIDI controllers. A 76-key keyboard was concealed within "Valentine" (still the prominently featured centerpiece of the stage), which was revealed at points during the show in which Gaspard or Xavier would play certain piano or organ portions of the setlist.

=== Woman World Wide Tour ===
The Woman World Wide tour, promoting the release of the Woman studio album, marked another evolution of the live show to include more intricate stage lighting, employing minimal video effects and moving lighting fixtures, while remaining true to the refusal to rely on video or lighting effects as the primary focus of performance. The Woman World Wide tour would be the first tour not using "Valentine" as the center of the stage. However, the signature cross motif was incorporated into the lighting suite.

The audio rig for Woman World Wide incorporated a wide number of analog synthesizers, involving seemingly more manual performance and interaction from Justice themselves. The Woman World Wide equipment included two Moog Sub Phattys, two Moog Voyagers (one XL), a Roland TB-3 and TB-03, an Akai LPD-8, among other miscellaneous effects pedals, MIDI keyboards, and control surfaces - some appearing to be custom-made. A Native Instruments Kontrol S-series keyboard was also seen used in the televised performance at AccorHotels Arena in Paris, France. Following the previous pattern of using Pioneer DJM series mixers, the Woman World Tour set also used four DJM900s.

In March 2019, the band introduced IRIS: A Space Opera by Justice, a 60-minute film of a live show recorded in an empty space without an audience. The film premiered at South by Southwest on 13 March, while a single projection in French theaters screened on 29 August. Critical reception was very positive, with Mixmag describing it as a "sensory triumph."

== Discography ==
Studio albums

- Cross (2007)
- Audio, Video, Disco (2011)
- Woman (2016)
- Hyperdrama (2024)

Soundtrack albums

- Grand Theft Auto VI: Original Score (2026)

== Filmography ==
- A Cross the Universe (2008)
- Iris: A Space Opera by Justice (2019)
- Justice - Blinded By The Lights (2027)

== Tours ==
- A Cross The Universe Tour (2007–2008)
- Justice Live! World Tour 2012 (2011–2013)
- Woman World Tour (2017–2018)
- Hyperdrama Tour (2024–2025)
