= Waters of Nazareth =

Single by Justice

from the album †
- B-side: "Let There Be Light"; "Carpates"
- Released: 14 September 2005
- Recorded: 2005
- Genre: Electro house; fidget house
- Length: 4:25
- Label: Ed Banger
- Songwriters: Gaspard Augé; Xavier de Rosnay
- Producer: Justice

Justice singles chronology
"Waters of Nazareth" (2005)	"We Are Your Friends" (2006)

Audio video
- "Waters of Nazareth" on YouTube

"Waters of Nazareth" is the debut single by French electronic music duo Justice, released on 14 September 2005.

== History ==
The Waters of Nazareth single was first released as a twelve-inch vinyl with a demo version of "Let There Be Light" and "Carpates". A second release of both a 12" and CD single includes remixes by DJ Funk, Erol Alkan, and Justice featuring Feadz.

"Waters of Nazareth" and a finished version of "Let There Be Light" later appeared on their 2007 debut album, †. (Note: While the album has been attributed many titles, including Cross and Justice, Xavier de Rosnay has stated the album is untitled. Justice has also stated the Latin cross symbol is preferred when referring to the album.)

== In popular culture ==
The song is featured on the ElectroChoc radio station on Grand Theft Auto IV. It was played in episode 5 of series 13 of Top Gear, when Jeremy Clarkson, Richard Hammond and James May drove three cheap rear wheel drive cars in an ice race in France. "Waters of Nazareth" also appears in Travis Rice's critically acclaimed snowboard film That's It, That's All, as well as in the 2016 film War Dogs. The song is featured in the reveal trailer for NHL 22. The song is also featured, although fused with "War" by Edwin Starr, in DJ Hero 2.

== Track listing ==
12-inch single (first release)
No.	Title	Length
1.	"Waters of Nazareth"	4:25
2.	"Let There Be Light" (demo version)	4:53
3.	"Carpates"	5:13
Total length:		14:31

12-inch single and CD (second release)
No.	Title	Length
1.	"Waters of Nazareth"	4:25
2.	"Let There Be Light" (demo version)	4:53
3.	"Carpates"	5:13
4.	"Waters of Nazareth" (Justice and Feadz remix)	5:09
5.	"Let There Be Light" (DJ Funk's Bounce Dat Ass remix)	4:40
6.	"Waters of Nazareth" (Erol Alkan's Durrr Durrr Durrrrrr re-edit)	6:11
Total length:		30:31

Japanese edition bonus track
No.	Title	Length
7.	"Let There Be Light" (Breakbot Remix)	3:29
Total length:		34:00

== Charts ==
Chart (2007)	Peak position
Denmark (Tracklisten)	15
France (SNEP)	88
