= We Are Your Friends (song) =

Single by Justice vs. Simian
- Released: 3 July 2006
- Genre: Electro house; synth-pop
- Length: 4:18
- Label: 10; Virgin
- Songwriters: Simian; Xavier de Rosnay; Gaspard Augé
- Producer: Justice

Justice single singles chronology
"Waters of Nazareth" (2005)	"We Are Your Friends" (2006)	"D.A.N.C.E." (2007)

Music video
- "We Are Your Friends" on YouTube

"We Are Your Friends" is a song credited to Justice vs. Simian, and is French duo Justice's remix of the track "Never Be Alone" by Simian. It was released as a single in 2006. It reached number 20 in the UK Singles Chart.

The song's music video won the 2006 MTV Europe Music Award for Best Video. The presentation of the award was interrupted by Kanye West.

The 2015 film We Are Your Friends took its title from the song.

It is also the current theme tune for the popular Greek television programme Or to alpha or to beta everybody goes for Marmita, with the performance artist being Kostis Raptopoulos.

The music video was the last to be played on the British music channel MTV Dance before it was replaced by Club MTV on 23 May 2018.

The track was mashed up with "Illmerica" (by Wolfgang Gartner) to form the track "Illmerica Are Your Friends" by Australian DJ Steve Camp; the song became popular after it was played as the opening track on episode 186 of Tiësto's radio show Club Life in 2010.

In 2023, the song was reworked by Dimitri Vegas and Steve Aoki under the title "Friends".

From September 2025, the song has been used by Lidl France as theme song of their new campaign "ça vaut le coup".

== Remixes ==
- "We Are Your Friends" (Two Lanes Remix)
- "We Are Your Friends" (K?d Remix)
- "Illmerica Are Your Friends" (Steve Camp Mashup).
