= D.A.N.C.E. =

Single by Justice

from the album †
- B-side: "B.E.A.T." (7", 12"); Extended mix (12"); "Phantom" (12"); Remixes
- Released: 23 April 2007
- Recorded: 2005–06 in Paris, France
- Genre: Nu-disco; dance-pop
- Length: 4:02 (album version): 3:32 (radio edit); 2:29 (English radio edit)
- Label: Ed Banger; Because
- Songwriters: Gaspard Augé; Jessie Chaton; Xavier de Rosnay
- Producer: Justice

Justice singles chronology
"We Are Your Friends" (2006)	"D.A.N.C.E." (2007)	"Phantom Pt. II" (2007)

Audio sample
- Justice – "D.A.N.C.E.": file; help

Music video
- "D.A.N.C.E." on YouTube

"D.A.N.C.E." is the second single by French electronic music duo Justice and the first from their 2007 album †. (Note: While the album has been attributed many titles, including Cross and Justice, Xavier de Rosnay has stated the album is untitled. Justice has also stated the Latin cross symbol is preferred when referring to the album.) It includes edited and extended versions of "D.A.N.C.E", a rougher mix in the style of their earlier releases, "B.E.A.T", and the track "Phantom" which was previously issued in limited quantities twice on 12" vinyl preceding the release of "D.A.N.C.E.".

== History and background ==
According to the duo, they were huge Michael Jackson fans and decided to dedicate the song to him. The song references various Michael Jackson songs including "P.Y.T. (Pretty Young Thing)", "Black or White", "Working Day and Night" and "Whatever Happens" along with the Jackson 5 song "ABC" and Michael Jackson's album Music & Me. The choruses of "D.A.N.C.E." contain an interpolation of the coda of Britney Spears's song "Me Against the Music". Vocals are provided by the London-based Foundation for Young Musicians choir.

The music video for "D.A.N.C.E." was shot by French directorial duo Jonas & François, with animation by French animator So Me. The video was nominated for the 2007 MTV Video Music Award "Video of the Year" and won the award at the MTV Europe Music Awards. The music video is shot in the style of pop art. In the video, Augé and de Rosnay walk, and the images of their t-shirts constantly change and morph (cars, mouths, thunderbolts, lollipops, numbers, letters, and the lyrics).

Many unofficial remixes of the song appeared on the Internet before its official release. Canadian electronic duo MSTRKRFT released an official version, being the only group to receive instrumentals and vocals separately. One remix was made by Washington, D.C. rapper Wale entitled "W.A.L.E.D.A.N.C.E."; the Chicago Reader picked it as a staff favourite from 2007 and called the remix "positively epic". Wale and Mark Ronson performed the song at the 2007 MTV Video Music Awards, and Wale later appeared on the cover of URB magazine with Justice.

The song was number 4 on Rolling Stone's list of the 100 Best Songs of 2007. The live version of the song was sampled by Swizz Beatz for Jay-Z's "On to the Next One" on The Blueprint 3 in 2009.

== Format and track listing ==
- 7" single
1. "D.A.N.C.E."
2. "B.E.A.T."
- 12" ED 016
1. "D.A.N.C.E." (radio edit)
2. "B.E.A.T." (extended)
3. "D.A.N.C.E." (extended)
4. "Phantom"
- Remixes 12" ED 019
1. "D.A.N.C.E." (radio edit)
2. "D.A.N.C.E." (Stuart Price remix)
3. "D.A.N.C.E." (Jackson remix)
4. "D.A.N.C.E." (MSTRKRFT remix)
5. "D.A.N.C.E." (live version)
6. "D.A.N.C.E." (Alan Braxe and Fred Falke remix)

== Chart performance ==
=== Weekly charts ===
Chart (2007–2013)	Peak position
Belgium (Ultratip Bubbling Under Flanders)	3
Belgium (Ultratip Bubbling Under Wallonia)	3
Finland (Suomen virallinen lista)	20
France (SNEP)	11
Italy (FIMI)	41
Switzerland (Schweizer Hitparade)	49
UK Singles (Official Charts)	48
UK Dance (Official Charts)	1
US Bubbling Under Hot 100 (Billboard)	3
US Dance Club Songs (Billboard)	10
US Hot Dance/Electronic Songs (Billboard)	13

=== Year-end charts ===
Chart (2013)	Position
US Hot Dance/Electronic Songs (Billboard)	97

== Certifications ==
Region	Certification	Certified units/sales
New Zealand (RMNZ)	Gold	15,000^{‡}
United Kingdom (BPI)	Silver	200,000^{‡}
United States (RIAA)	Gold	500,000^{‡}
^{‡} Sales+streaming figures based on certification alone.

== Release history ==
Release dates and formats for "D.A.N.C.E."
Region	Date	Format	Label(s)	Ref.
United States	January 29, 2008	Mainstream airplay	Ed Banger	
