= Ed Banger Records discography =

The following is a comprehensive list of releases from French electronic music record label Ed Banger Records.

== Singles and extended plays ==
Year	Artist	Release	Type	Release date	Physical cat. number	Digital cat. number
2003	Mr. Flash / A Bass Day	Radar Rider / F.I.S.T.	EP	March 7, 2003	ED001	ED001 / BEC5907352
2003	Justice vs. Simian / Justice vs. Gambit / Espion	Never Be Alone / Steamulation / Anything Is Possible	EP	June, 2003	ED002	No
2004	Vicarious Bliss	Theme from Vicarious Bliss	EP	February 16, 2004	ED003	BEC5772022
2004	Krazy Baldhead	Bill's Break	EP	July 7, 2004	ED004	BEC5772023
2004	Busy P	Limit Ed	EP	2004	LTED001	No
2005	Justice	Waters of Nazareth	EP	September 16, 2005	ED005	BEC5772490
2005	Sebastian	Smoking Kills (?)	EP	March 10, 2005	ED006	BEC5772024
2005	Sebastian / Krazy Baldhead	H.A.L. / Time.Period	EP	August, 2005	LTED002	No
2005	Zongamin	Bongo Song	EP	December 1, 2005	ED007	BEC5772025
2006	Uffie	Pop the Glock / Ready to Uff	EP	February 23, 2006	ED008	ED008
2006	Justice	Waters of Nazareth Pt. II / Water of Nazareth (The Remixes)	EP	April 3, 2006	ED005.2	BEC5772491
2006	DJ Mehdi feat. Chromeo	I Am Somebody	EP	May 22, 2006	ED009	3115092
2006	Justice vs. Gambit	Steamulation	Single	November 20, 2006	No	BEC5772020
2006	Mr. Flash	Champions / Disco Dynamite	EP	July 14, 2006	ED010	BEC5772065
2006	Sebastian	Ross Ross Ross	EP	August 28, 2006	ED011	BEC5772041
2006	Uffie	Hot Chick / In Charge	EP	December 7, 2006	ED012	No
2006	Justice	Phantom / D.A.N.C.E	EP	December, 2006	ED014LTD	No
2007	Krazy Baldhead	Dry Guillotine	EP	January 12, 2007	ED013	ED013
2007	Busy P	Rainbow Man	EP	February 19, 2007	ED014	5060107720831
2007	DJ Mehdi	Lucky Girl EP	EP	March 5, 2007	ED015	BEC5772084
2007	DJ Mehdi / Radar	Lucky Boy (Remixed By Radar) / 5th Columnist (DJ Mehdi Remix)	EP	April, 2007	MEHDAR001	No
2007	Justice	D.A.N.C.E	EP	April 30, 2007	ED017 + ED017.2	BEC5772071
2007	Mr. Oizo	Transexual / Patrick122	EP	June 5, 2007	ED016	ED016
2007	Uffie	F1rst Love / Brand New Car	EP	June 28, 2007	ED018	ED018
2007	Justice	D.A.N.C.E Remixes	EP	July 16, 2007	ED019	BEC5772130
2007	Sebastian	Walkman 2	EP	October 12, 2007	BEC5772152	No
2007	Justice	D.A.N.C.E (Remixes Extended)	EP	October 29, 2007	No	BEC5772163
2007	Justice	Phantom Pt. II	EP	November 26, 2007	ED019	BEC5772169
2008	DSL	Invaders	EP	February 28, 2008	ED020	BEC5772319
2008	Feadz	Happy Meal	EP	March 19, 2008	ED021	BEC5772320
2008	Justice	DVNO	EP	March 24, 2008	ED022	BEC5772316
2008	Sebastian	Motor	EP	April 28, 2008	ED023	BEC5772299
2008	Busy P	Pedrophilia	EP	June 23, 2008	ED024	BEC5772360
2008	Justice	Planisphère	EP	July 8, 2008	No	—
2008	Mickey Moonlight	Interplanetary Music	EP	September 11, 2008	ED025	BEC5772412
2008	Mr. Oizo	Positif	EP	November 10, 2008	ED027	BEC5772422
2008	DJ Mehdi	Pocket Piano	EP	December 8, 2008	ED026	BEC5772382
2009	Justice feat. Uffie	Tthhee Ppaarrttyy	Single	February 9, 2009	No	1565274
2009	Mr. Oizo	Pourriture	EP	March 16, 2009	ED028	BEC5772471 / BEC5772473
2009	Krazy Baldhead	Sweet Night	EP	March 23, 2009	ED029	BEC5772451
2009	Feadz	P*N*M*B	EP	July 6, 2009	ED030	BEC5772524
2009	DSL	Stupid Bitches	EP	October 26, 2009	ED031	BEC5772549
2009	Uffie	Pop the Glock	Single	October 19, 2009	No	BEC5772588
2009	Uffie	Pop the Glock (Ellen Allien Bang the Glock Mix 2009)	Single	November 16, 2009	No	BEC5772624
2009	Uffie	Pop the Glock	EP	November 30, 2009	ED032	BEC5772606
2009	Uffie	MCs Can Kiss	EP	December 25, 2009	ED033	BEC5772658
2010	Breakbot	Baby I'm Yours	EP	February 14, 2010	ED034	BEC5772647
2010	Mr. Flash	Blood, Sweat & Tears	EP	April 26, 2010	ED035	BEC5772649
2010	Uffie	A.D.D. S.U.V.	Single	April 30, 2010	No	BEC5772677
2010	Mickey Moonlight	Love Pattern EP	EP	May 10, 2010	ED036	BEC5772663
2010	Carte Blanche	Black Billionaires EP	EP	May 31, 2010	ED037	BEC5772676
2010	Uffie feat. Pharrell Williams	A.D.D. S.U.V.	EP	May 17, 2010	ED038	BEC5772660
2010	Breakbot	Baby I'm Yours (Remix)	Single	June 21, 2010	ED034.2	BEC5772699
2010	Mr. Oizo & Gaspard Augé	Rubber	EP	July 12, 2010	ED039	BEC5772705
2010	Squarepusher & Edrec present Shobaleader One	Cryptic Motion	EP	August 30, 2010	ED040	BEC5772724
2010	Cassius	I <3 U So	Single	September 27, 2010	No	BEC5772752
2010	Cassius	The Rawkers E.P.	EP	October 8, 2010	ED041	BEC5772719 / BEC5772914
2010	Uffie	Difficult	EP	October 18, 2010	ED042	BEC5772746
2010	Feadz	The T.U.F.F.	Single	November 26, 2010	No	BEC5772786
2010	Carte Blanche feat. Kid Sister	Do! Do! Do! (Laidback Luke Remix)	Single	November 29, 2010	No	BEC5772787
2010	Feadz	The TUFF EP	EP	December 6, 2010	ED043	BEC5772779
2010	Carte Blanche	Black Billionaires - The Remixes	EP	December 13, 2010	ED044	BEC5772780
2011	Busy P	Procrastinator	Single	February 21, 2011	No	5060421568607
2011	Cassius	I <3 U So	EP	March 1, 2011	ED045	BEC5772805
2011	Uffie	Illusion of Love (Fred Falke Remix)	Single	March 13, 2011	No	BEC5772845
2011	Justice	Civilization	Single	March 28, 2011	ED047	BEC5772847
2011	Sebastian	Embody	EP	April 4, 2011	ED046	BEC5772858
2011	Uffie	Wordy Rappinghood	Single	April 18, 2011	BEC5772870	BEC5772871
2011	Breakbot	Fantasy	EP	April 22, 2011	ED049	BEC5772905
2011	Carte Blanche	White Man On the Moon	EP	May 30, 2011	ED048	BEC5772904
2011	Justice	Civilization (Remixes)	EP	June 6, 2011	No	BEC5772903
2011	Sebastian feat. M.I.A.	C.T.F.O.	EP	August 22, 2011	ED051	BEC5161041
2011	Sebastian feat. Mayer Hawthorne	Love In Motion	EP	September 12, 2011	ED053	BEC5161065 / BEC5161183
2011	Justice	Audio, Video, Disco	EP	September 26, 2011	ED052	BEC5161071
2011	Mickey Moonlight	Close to Everything	EP	October 17, 2011	ED050	BEC5161055 / BEC5161078
2011	DSL	Supa Love	EP	October 31, 2011	ED054	BEC5161088 / BEC5161089
2012	Justice	On'n'On	EP	January 27, 2012	ED055 + ED055.2	BEC5161126
2012	Krazy Baldhead	Surabaya Girl	EP	February 6, 2012	ED056	BEC5161054
2012	Feadz & Kito	Electric Empire	EP	March 26, 2012	ED057	BEC5161186
2012	Laurent Garnier feat. L.B.S. Crew	Timeless EP	EP	April 1, 2012	ED058	BEC5161187
2012	Sebastian	The EP Collection	EP	April 16, 2012	ED059	No
2012	Mickey Moonlight	Come On Humans!	EP	May 7, 2012	ED060	5060281612113
2012	Breakbot	Programme	Single	March 16, 2012	ED061	—
2012	Justice	New Lands	EP	June 22, 2012	ED062	BEC5161222
2012	Krazy Baldhead	Empty Boy	EP	June 6, 2012	ED063	BEC5161231
2012	Mr. Oizo	Stade 3	EP	July 9, 2012	ED064	BEC5610787
2012	Breakbot feat. Irfane	One Out of Two	EP	June 15, 2012	ED065	BEC5161236
2012	Boston Bun	Housecall EP	EP	November 26, 2012	ED066	BEC5161308
2012	Feadz & Kito	Electric Empire (Remixes)	EP	November 26, 2012	ED067	BEC5161323
2013	Justice	Helix	EP	January 7, 2013	ED068	BEC5161318
2013	Riton	Lost My Mind	EP	January 21, 2013	ED069	BEC5161327
2013	Cashmere Cat	Mirror Maru Remix EP	EP	February 18, 2013	ED070	4050486095737
2013	Laurent Garnier	"Jacques In the Box" Remixes	EP	April 1, 2013	ED071	BEC5161378 / BEC5161388
2013	Busy P	Still Busy	EP	June 21, 2013	ED075	BEC5161398
2013	Breakbot feat. Ruckazoid	You Should Know	EP	June 28, 2013	ED072	BEC5161409
2013	Mr. Oizo	Amicalement	EP	July 1, 2013	ED073	—
2013	Boston Bun	Flasher EP	EP	October 7, 2013	ED074	45570 / 5060281616593
2014	DJ Pone	Erratic Impulses	EP	January 14, 2014	ED076	58540 / 5060281617439
2014	Busy P feat. Andrew Woodhead	This Song (Desirre Remix)	Single	March 10, 2014	No	62409
2014	Busy P	Reworking Is Not a Crime	EP	March 24, 2014	ED077	BEC5650514
2014	Busy P	Rainbow Man 2014 / Rainbow Man 2.0	EP	April 28, 2014	No	62967 / 5060421568546
2014	Riton	Bad Guy Ri Ri	EP	May 26, 2014	ED078	BEC5161867
2014	Boston Bun	We Got Soul	EP	June 16, 2014	ED079	BEC5161874
2014	Mr. Flash	Midnight Blue	EP	July 14, 2014	ED080	63821 / 5060281619174
2015	Boston Bun	Just For Freaks I	EP	January 26, 2015	ED081	79107 / 5060421562650
2015	Mr. Flash	Bagheera	EP	May 12, 2015	ED082	72382 / 5060421561738
2015	Boston Bun	Just For Freaks II	EP	April 26, 2015	ED083	72080 / 5060421561509
2015	Para One & The South African Youth Choir	Elevation	EP	July 23, 2015	ED086	78649 / 5060421562452
2015	Feadz	Superseeded	EP	October 22, 2015	ED087	87176 / 5060421563213
2015	Boston Bun feat. Mayer Hawthorne	Paris Groove	Single	October 30, 2015	ED088	87222 / 5060421563244
2015	Breakbot	Get Lost	Single	December 4, 2015	ED089	91318
2015	Mr. Oizo feat. Charli XCX	Hand In the Fire	EP	December 11, 2015	ED090	5060421563381
2016	Fulgeance	The Phoenix	EP	February 26, 2016	ED091	109826 / 5060421565934
2016	Borussia	Sour Stroke	EP	April 15, 2016	ED092	105131 / 5060421565378
2016	Breakbot	Get Lost Remixes	EP	April 16, 2016	ED093	No
2016	Cassius feat. Cat Power and Mike D	Action	Single	July 8, 2016	BEC5156429	00602547864901
2016	Justice	Safe and Sound	Single	July 13, 2016	No	112428
2016	Justice	Randy (Radio Edit)	Single	September 14, 2016	No	120000
2016	Breakbot	2Good4Me / My Toy (Remixes)	EP	October 28, 2016	ED094	121557
2016	Boston Bun feat. Loreen	Get Into It	Single	November 25, 2016	No	5060421567907
2016	Justice	Fire (Radio Edit)	Single	November 18, 2016	No	127940
2017	Borussia	Kinda Love	EP	January 27, 2017	ED095	5060421567969
2017	Busy P feat. Mayer Hawthorne	Genie	EP	February 24, 2017	ED096	BEC5650516
2017	10LEC6	Bedjem Mebok	EP	March 24, 2017	ED097	149623 / 5060421569024
2017	Lori Goldstone	Music for Études N°11	EP	November 17, 2017	ED098	—
2017	Justice	Pleasure (Live)	Single	July 21, 2017	No	169256 / 5060525431470
2017	Cassius	Ibifornia	EP	July 28, 2017	ED099	169238 / 00602557867510
2017	Myd	All Inclusive	EP	October 13, 2017	ED101	178597 / 5060525432477
2017	Vladimir Cauchemar	Aulos	Single	December 4, 2017	ED102	5060525432682
2018	Sabrina & Samantha	KhÉOPS	EP	January 26, 2018	ED103	BEC5543380
2018	10LEC6	Bone Bame (Superpitcher Dub Remix)	Single	February 2, 2018	No	BEC5543367
2018	10LEC6	Bone Bame (Waajeed Bone Dub Remix)	Single	February 7, 2018	No	BEC5543401
2018	10LEC6	Bone Bame (DJ Lycox Remix)	Single	February 16, 2018	No	BEC5543402
2018	Borussia feat. Malvina	Se Vuoi Ballare	EP	May 4, 2018	ED105	BEC5543537
2018	Justice	Stop (WWW)	Single	May 7, 2018	No	BEC5543564
2018	Krazy Baldhead	Stand Tall	Single	May 17, 2018	ED108	BEC5543582
2018	Myd	All Inclusive Remixes	EP	May 25, 2018	ED107	BEC5543576
2018	Cassius	W18	Single	June 18, 2018	No	BEC5543641
2018	Justice	D.A.N.C.E. x Fire x Safe and Sound (WWW)	Single	June 22, 2018	No	BEC5543633
2018	Breakbot feat. Ruckazoid	Another You	Single	June 29, 2018	No	BEC5543670
2018	Justice	Randy (WWW)	Single	July 5, 2018	No	BEC5543646
2018	Justice	Chorus (WWW)	Single	August 17, 2018	No	BEC5543645
2018	Myd feat. Cola Boyy	Muchas	Single	September 5, 2018	ED110	BEC5543736
2018	Vladimir Cauchemar feat. 6ix9ine	Aulos Reloaded	Single	September 28, 2018	No	BEC5543796
2018	Breakbot	Another You	EP	September 28, 2018	ED106	BEC5543774
2018	DJ Medhi	Pocket Piano (Orchestral Version)	Single	October 19, 2018	No	BEC5543805
2018	Handbraekes	#3	EP	October 26, 2018	ED109	BEC5543813
2018	10LEC6	Ayong Ya Yop	Single	November 19, 2018	ED111	BEC5543841
2018	Thomas Roussel, Orchestre Lamoureux & Cassius	I <3 U SO (Orchestral Version)	Single	November 21, 2018	No	BEC5543850
2018	Cassius	W18 (Remixes)	EP	November 30, 2018	ED113	BEC5543847
2019	Mr. Oizo	Rythme Plat	EP	March 22, 2019	ED114	BEC5543984
2019	Myd	Superdiscoteca	EP	April 19, 2019	ED115	BEC5650017
2019	Sebastian	Thirst	Single	May 9, 2019	No	BEC5650047
2019	Sebastian feat. Gallant	Run for Me	Single	May 13, 2019	No	BEC5650087
2019	Sebastian	Beograd	Single	July 8, 2019	No	BEC5650174
2019	Domenico Torti feat. Afrika Bambaataa	Radar	EP	August 30, 2019	ED116	BEC5650197
2019	Sebastian feat. Mayer Hawthorne	Better Now	Single	September 5, 2019	No	BEC5650389
2019	Sebastian feat. Bakar	Sober	Single	October 8, 2019	No	BEC5650500
2019	Sebastian feat. Syd	Doorman	Single	November 5, 2019	No	BEC5650586
2019	Molecule	Big Mama	Single	October 8, 2019	—	—
2019	Les Rita Mitsouko	Andy (Folamour's Italo Remix)	Single	December 20, 2019	No	BEC5650706
2020	Molecule	Nazaré	EP	January 17, 2020	ED117	BEC5650692
2020	Sebastian feat. Syd	Doorman (Steffi Remix)	Single	January 24, 2020	—	BEC5650752
2020	Myd	Superdiscoteca (nit Remix)	Single	February 14, 2020	No	BEC5650831
2020	Sebastian feat. Bakar	Sober (Jimmy Edgar Remix)	Single	February 28, 2020	—	BEC5650852
2020	Breakbot feat. Delafleur	Be Mine Tonight	Single	March 13, 2020	No	BEC5650890
2020	Mr. Oizo feat. Roméo Elvis	Pharmacist	Single	April 3, 2020	ED118	BEC5650957
2020	Myd	Together We Stand	Single	June 17, 2020	No	BEC5676050
2020	Breakbot feat. Delafleur	Be Mine Tonight / Translight	Single	June 26, 2020	ED119	BEC5676137
2020	Myd	Together We Stand (Bullion Remix)	Single	July 22, 2020	No	BEC5676267
2020	Myd	Together We Stand (Radio Slave and Thomas Gandey Remix)	Single	July 29, 2020	No	BEC5676269 / BEC5676270
2020	Myd	Together We Stand (Wuh Oh Remix)	Single	August 5, 2020	No	BEC5676270
2020	Myd	Together We Stand (Remixes)	EP	August 7, 2020	ED120	BEC5676265 / BEC5676266
2020	Sebastian	Saint Laurent Men's Spring Summer 21 (Hysterias)	Single	September 10, 2020	BEC1257	BEC5676552 / BEC5676602
2020	Busy P	Colette c'est chouette	Single	September 28, 2020	LTED002	
2020	Myd & Mac Demarco	Moving Men	Single	October 28, 2020	No	BEC5676578
2020	Myd & Mac Demarco	Moving Men (Bob Sinclar Remix)	Single	November 27, 2020	No	BEC5676800
2020	Myd & Mac Demarco	Moving Men (Panteros666 Remix)	Single	December 4, 2020	No	BEC5676811
2020	Myd & Mac Demarco	Moving Men (Gaspard Augé & Victor Le Masne Remix)	Single	December 15, 2020	No	BEC5676802
2020	Metronomy	Mandibules (Main Theme)	Single	December 16, 2020	ED121	BEC5676829
2021	Sebastian feat. Syd	Doorman (Vegyn Remix)	Single	January 4, 2021	—	BEC5676902
2021	Myd & Mac Demarco	Moving Men (Metronomy Remix)	Single	January 15, 2021	No	BEC5676801
2021	Myd & Mac Demarco	Moving Men (Remixes)	EP	January 15, 2021	ED123 / BEC5676782	BEC5676794 / BEC5676808
2021	Myd	Born a Loser	Single	February 18, 2021	No	BEC5676968
2021	Myd	Born a Loser (Mad Rey Remix)	Single	March 30, 2021	No	BEC5907176
2021	Myd	Let You Speak	Single	April 8, 2021	No	BEC5907090
2021	Alex Frankel	Still Got It	EP	April 15, 2021	ED122	
2021	Gaspard Augé	Force majeure	Single	April 15, 2021	No	BEC5907115
2021	Gaspard Augé	Hey!	Single	May 12, 2021	No	BEC5907283
2021	Gaspard Augé	Vox	Single	June 2, 2021	No	BEC5907434
2021	Mad Rey feat. Jwles	Joe da Zin	Single	June 11, 2021	No	BEC5907426
2021	Gaspard Augé	Captain	Single	June 16, 2021	No	BEC5907412
2021	Myd feat. L'Impératrice	Loverini	Single	June 18, 2021	No	BEC5907498
2021	Gaspard Augé	Belladone	Single	June 21, 2021	No	BEC5907529
2021	Busy P feat. Shay Lia & Haich Ber Na	Track of Time	Single	June 21, 2021	No	BEC5907484
2021	Sebastian	Saint Laurent Men's Spring Summer 19	Single	July 1, 2021	BEC1240	BEC5907686
2021	Sebastian	Saint Laurent Men's Spring Summer 20	Single	July 1, 2021	BEC1243	BEC5907689
2021	Sebastian	Saint Laurent Women's Spring Summer 17	Single	July 1, 2021	BEC1236	BEC5907681
2021	Sebastian	Saint Laurent Women's Summer 18	Single	July 1, 2021	BEC1238	BEC5907683
2021	Sebastian	Saint Laurent Women's Summer 19	Single	July 1, 2021	BEC1241	BEC5907685
2021	Sebastian	Saint Laurent Women's Summer 20	Single	July 1, 2021	BEC1241	BEC5907688
2021	Sebastian	Saint Laurent Women's Summer 21	Single	July 1, 2021	BEC1270	BEC5907691
2021	Sebastian	Saint Laurent Women's Winter 17	Single	July 1, 2021	BEC1237	BEC5907682
2021	Sebastian	Saint Laurent Women's Winter 18	Single	July 1, 2021	BEC1239	BEC5907684
2021	Sebastian	Saint Laurent Women's Winter 19	Single	July 1, 2021	BEC1242	BEC5907687
2021	Sebastian	Saint Laurent Women's Winter 20	Single	July 1, 2021	BEC1248	BEC5907690
2021	Myd	Let You Speak (PPJ Remix)	Single	July 2, 2021	No	BEC5907564
2021	Myd	Let You Speak (Picard Brothers Remix)	Single	July 16, 2021	No	BEC5907480
2021	Mad Rey	B.R.O	EP	July 16, 2021	ED125 / BEC5907199	BEC5907420
2021	Pierre Rousseau	Music for Etudes N°18 - Spring Summer 2021	EP	July 19, 2021	ED124	BEC5907755
2021	Myd	Let You Speak (Remixes)	EP	July 30, 2021	No	BEC5907703
2021	Busy P feat. Shay Lia & Haich Ber Na	Track of Time	EP	August 27, 2021	ED127 / BEC5907308	BEC5907485
2021	Metallica	Don't Tread on Else Matters (SebastiAn Remix)	Single	September 24, 2021	ED666	
2021	Myd feat. Juan Wauters	Whether the Weather (Laurent Garnier Remix)	Single	September 24, 2021	No	BEC5907778
2021	Myd	Club Mixes	EP	September 24, 2021	ED126 / BEC5907299	
2022	DJ Mehdi & Busy P feat. Benjamin Epps & Santigold	MPC 2021	Single	January 19, 2022	ED129	BEC5610481
2022	Breakbot & Irfane	Remedy	Single	January 28, 2022	No	BEC5610446
2022	Myd feat. JAWNY	The Sun	Single	February 11, 2022	No	BEC5610513
2022	Breakbot & Irfane	Remedy	EP	March 18, 2022	ED128 / BEC5610502	BEC5610447
2022	Myd	Domino	Single	June 9, 2022	No	BEC5610916
2022	Justice	D.A.N.C.E. (Extended)	Reissue EP	June 10, 2022	No	BEC5611004
2022	Thomas Roussel	Late Metal	EP	June 22, 2022	ED131	BEC5610909
2022	Myd	Domino (Remixes)	EP	July 8, 2022	No	BEC5611124
2022	Sebastian	Saint Laurent Men's Summer 23	Single	August 19, 2022	No	BEC5611246
2022	Myd feat. Picard Brothers	I Made It	Single	September 23, 2022	No	BEC5611285
2022	Myd feat. Picard Brothers	I Made It (Picard Brothers Version)	Single	October 7, 2022	No	BEC5611332
2022	Justice	Planisphère	Reissue EP	October 14, 2022	ED133 / BEC5610968	BEC5611396
2022	Justice	D.A.N.C.E. (Logic Reprise)	Single	December 8, 2022	No	BEC 5611557
2022	Sebastian	Saint Laurent Women's Summer 23	Single	December 16, 2022	No	BEC5611560
2023	Varnish La Piscine	Ring Island	Single	January 27, 2023	No	BEC5611746
2023	SebastiAn & Ehla	What a Wonderful World	Single	February 15, 2023	No	BEC5611786
2023	Varnish La Piscine	Nubian Farlow	Single	February 24, 2023	No	BEC5611820
2023	Varnish La Piscine	This Lake Is Successful	EP	March 24, 2023	ED132 / BEC5610879	BEC5611747
2023	Pierre Rousseau	TWENTY - Music for Études N°20 - Spring Summer 2022	EP	May 5, 2023	ED134	BEC5612576
2024	Justice	One Night / All Night, Generator	Single	January 24, 2024	No	BEC5613580
2024	Justice & Rimon	Afterimage (Justice Remix)	Single	May 24, 2024	No	-
2024	Justice	Incognito (Justice Remix)	Single	June 10, 2024	-	No
2024	Justice & Tame Impala	Neverender (Remixes)	EP	September 27, 2024 / December 12, 2024	BEC5614802	BEC5614802
2025	Justice & Rimon	Afterimage (Remixes)	EP	April 30, 2025	No	BEC5615947
2025	Mr. Oizo & Chilly Gonzales	L'Accident De Piano	EP	July 2, 2025 / September xx 2025	ED138	BEC5616415
2025	Tatyana Jane	Good Morning	Single	October 24, 2025	No	BEC5616942
2025	Myd, KiNK	Song for You (Kink Remix)	Single	November 26, 2025	No	BEC5617230
2025	Myd	Mydnight (Remixes)	EP	December 12, 2025	No	BEC5617273
2026	Tatyana Jane	Brutal/Orbit	Single	March 19, 2026	No	BEC5617644
2026	Tatyana Jane	Discordia	EP	June 4, 2026	ED139	BEC5618240
2026	Busy P, Myd & Twinsmatic	Paris Worldwide	Single	June 21, 2026	No	BEC5618346
2026	Varnish La Piscine	Lets Talk	Single	September 24, 2026	No	BEC5618582
2026	Justice, Tame Impala, SZA, King Gizzard & The Lizard Wizard	Flower In A Hurricane	Single	October 15, 2026	No	BEC5618748
2026	Justice feat. Gesaffelstein	Pusher	Single	October 29, 2026	No	BEC5618857

== Albums and long plays ==
Year	Artist	Release	Type	Release date	Physical cat. number	Digital cat. number
2005	Mr. Flash	Monsieur Sexe	LP	February 14, 2005	EDCD001	No
2006	DJ Mehdi	Lucky Boy	Album	October 30, 2006	EDCD004	3117172
2007	DJ Mehdi	Lucky Boy at Night	Album	May 4, 2007	EDCD004.2	BEC5772331
2007	Justice	Cross	Album	June 11, 2007	BEC5772108	3124702
2008	Sebastian	Remixes / A Fine Selection of Remixes	Remixes compilation	August 22, 2008	BEC5772341	BEC5772400
2008	Mr. Oizo	Lambs Anger	Album	November 17, 2008	BEC5772418	BEC5772432
2008	Justice	A Cross the Universe	Live album	November 24, 2008	BEC5772406	BEC5772429
2009	Krazy Baldhead	The B-Suite	Album	April 6, 2009	EDCD009	BEC5772476
2009	DJ Mehdi	Black Black & Black	Remixes mixtape	October 15, 2009	Promo	—
2009	DJ Mehdi	Red Black & Blue	Remixes mixtape	November 9, 2009	BEC5772556	5060107725560
2010	Uffie	Sex Dreams and Denim Jeans	Album	June 14, 2010	BEC5772591	BEC5772682 / BEC5772683 / BEC5772684
2011	Sebastian	Total	Album	May 30, 2011	BEC5772823	BEC5772823
2011	Justice	Audio, Video, Disco	Album	October 24, 2011	BEC5161063	BEC5161083
2011	Mr. Oizo	Stade 2	Album	November 11, 2011	BEC5161086	BEC5161095
2011	Mickey Moonlight	And the Time-Axis Manipulation Corporation	Album	November 28, 2011	BEC5161036	BEC5161101
2012	Krazy Baldhead	The Noise In the Sky	Album	February 29, 2012	BEC5161145	BEC5161035
2012	Breakbot	By Your Side	Album	September 17, 2012	BEC5161259	BEC5161258
2013	DSL	After	Album	February 11, 2013	BEC5161316	BEC5161316
2013	Justice	Access All Arenas	Live album	May 6, 2013	BEC5161307	BEC5161306
2014	Feadz	Instant Alpha	Album	January 20, 2014	BEC5161677	BEC5161749
2014	Mr. Flash	Sonic Crusader	Album	June 2, 2014	BEC5161720	BEC5161857
2015	Molecule	60° 43' Nord	Album	April 18, 2015	ED085	5060421565392
2016	Breakbot	Still Waters	Album	February 5, 2016	EDLP2016-1	95525 / 5060421564166
2016	Cassius	Ibifornia	Album	August 26, 2016	EDLP2016-2	5060421565293
2016	Mr. Oizo	All Wet	Album	September 30, 2016	EDLP2016-3	BEC52156652
2016	Justice	Woman	Album	November 18, 2016	EDLP2016 / BEC5156620	119595
2018	10LEC6	Bone Bame	Album	March 9, 2018	ED104 / EDLP2017	BEC5543312
2018	Justice	Woman Worldwide	Remixed album	August 24, 2018	EDLP2018-1 / BEC5543644	BEC5543644
2019	Tommy Guerrero / Trevor Jackson	Dub Tunes	Album	February 1, 2019	ED112	—
2019	Sebastian	Thirst	Album	November 15, 2019	EDLP2019-01 / BEC5543956	BEC5650634
2021	Myd	Born a Loser	Album	April 30, 2021	EDLP2021-1 / BEC5676589	BEC5676969
2021	Gaspard Augé	Escapades	Album	June 25, 2021	EDLP2021-2 / BEC5676587	BEC5907027
2022	Mr. Oizo & Phra	Voilá	Album	February 18, 2022	EDLP2022-1 / BEC5610193	BEC5610432
2022	Breakbot	By Your Side (10th Anniversary Edition)	Reissue album	October 7, 2022	No	BEC5611383
2022	Justice	† (Anniversary Edition)	Reissue album	December 16, 2022	No	BEC5611556
2024	Justice	Hyperdrama	Album	April 26, 2024	EDLP2024-1	
2025	Myd	Mydnight	Album	August 28, 2025	EDLP2025-1	BEC5615965

== Compilations ==
Year	Artist	Release	Type	Release date	Physical cat. number	Digital cat. number
2006	DJ Mehdi	Loukoums	Mix	May, 2006	Promo	No
2006	Various Artists	Ed Rec Vol. 1	Compilation	December 6, 2006	BEC5772068	BEC5543920
2007	Various Artists	Ed Rec Vol. 2	Compilation	March 5, 2007	EDLP002 / EDCD005	BEC5772081
2008	Various Artists	Ed Rec Vol. 3	Compilation	June 2, 2008	EDLP003	BEC5772339
2011	Busy P & DJ Mehdi	Let the Children Techno	Compilation	February 21, 2011	BEC5772801	BEC5772814
2011	Various Artists	The Bee Sides	Compilation	April 16, 2011	RSD11BANGER	No
2013	Various Artists	Ed Rec Vol. X	Compilation	June 7, 2013	BEC5161387	BEC5161387
2014	Various Artists	Ed Banger Kick Ass	Compilation	April 19, 2014	BEC5161807	No
2017	Various Artists	Ed Rec 100	Compilation	May 12, 2017	ED100 / EDLP2017	5060421569864
2018	Various Artists	Ed Banger 15 Ans	Live album	November 23, 2018	EDLP2018-2	BEC5543798
2023	Various Artists	Ed Banger Club Classics Vol. 1	Box set	April 23, 2023	EDBOX1 / BEC5611752	No
2023	Various Artists	Support Your Local Record Label	Best Of	June 16, 2023	ED2023 / BEC5611761	BEC5612595
2023	Various Artists	Ed Banger Club Classics Vol. 2	Box set	October 13, 2023	EDBOX2 / BEC5612791	No
2026	Sebastian	Saint Laurent Shows	Compilation	May 28, 2026	No	BEC5618262

== Soundtracks ==
Year	Artist	Release	Release date	Physical cat. number	Digital cat. number
2007	Sébastien Tellier, Mr. Oizo & Sebastian	Steak: Music from the Motion Picture	June 18, 2007	EDOST001	5060107721128
2010	Sebastian	Notre Jour Viendra OST	September 13, 2010	EDOST002	BEC5772730
2010	Mr. Oizo & Gaspard Augé	Rubber (Original Soundtrack)	November 8, 2010	EDOST003	BEC5772735
2012	Tahiti Boy & Mr. Oizo	Wrong (Original Soundtrack)	September 10, 2012	BEC5161228	BEC5161228
2013	Mr. Oizo	Wrong Cops (Best Of)	December 20, 2012	EDBO05	BEC5161753
2014	Various Artists	Vandroid (Original Soundtrack)	July 1, 2014	BEC5161806	—
2015	Busy P	Gypsy Life (Original Soundtrack)	May 24, 2015	ED084	72415 / 5060421560656
2021	Laurent Garnier	Off the Record Soundtrack	August 27, 2021	EDLP2021-3	
2022	Pierre III	Jeune & Golri (Bande originale de la série)	March 12, 2022	ED130	
2023	Sebastian	Tropic (Original Motion Picture Soundtrack)	Aug 25, 2023	ED135	BEC5612663
2024	Thomas Bangalter	Daaaaaalí! (Bande Originale du Film)	February 9, 2024	ED136 / BEC5613418	
2026	Justice	Grand Theft Auto VI: Original Score	December 11, 2026		

== Sublabel ED (Exclusively Digital) ==
Year	Artist	Release	Release date	Physical cat. number	Digital cat. number
2025	YSN feat. Maneno	It was U	October 17, 2025	No	EXD001 / BEC5616955
2025	Mayaewk	All Good	November 25, 2025	No	EXD002 / BEC5617212
2026	Address Hymen	She's my ride or die	January 30, 2026	No	EXD003 / BEC5617460
2026	Leo Pol x Poté	I've been good	March 6, 2026	No	EXD004 / BEC5617744
2026	Domenico Torti	Bloghouse	November 6, 2026	No	EXD005 / BEC5618846

== Notes ==
Keys
	The main series catalog number was assigned to release, but it wasn't released on physical media
No	Wasn't released
—	Has no catalog number
