= Pop the Glock/Ready to Uff =

Pop the Glock / Ready to Uff

EP by Uffie
- Released: January 2006 (limited promo release); February 27, 2006 (official release)
- Recorded: 2005
- Genre: Underground hip hop, electropop
- Length: 13:04
- Label: Arcade Mode, Ed Banger
- Producer: Feadz, Mr. Oizo

Uffie chronology
Pop the Glock / Ready to Uff (2006)	Hot Chick (2006)

"Pop the Glock / Ready to Uff" is the first release from French-American singer Uffie. The release includes "Pop the Glock" and "Ready to Uff", her first two singles. "Pop the Glock" started out as a Myspace demo and ended up gaining Uffie international fame. Uffie recorded "Pop the Glock" in 2005 when she was only 17 years old and after showing it to Busy P, owner of French electronic label Ed Banger Records she was offered a record deal. "Pop the Glock" was written by Uffie and produced by Feadz and samples the beat and lyrics from Top Billin' by 1980s hip-hop duo Audio Two. "Ready to Uff", written by Uffie and Feadz, while produced by Mr. Oizo was included as the B-side to the release and was also released as a successful single later on.

A music video for "Pop the Glock" was released on October 3, 2009 and was directed by Nathalie Canguilhem. The video was shot at the house featured in Boogie Nights and features a guest appearance from Sky Ferreira.

== Release ==
"Pop the Glock/Ready to Uff" was first given a limited promo release on record label Arcade Mode in January 2006, and then "officially" as an EP, on Ed Banger Records on February 27, 2006. This release also includes a remix of "Pop the Glock" by fellow Ed Banger artist, SebastiAn and a TV track of "Ready to Uff.".

In 2009, "Pop the Glock" was re-released as an EP, as a promotional release for her upcoming album Sex Dreams and Denim Jeans. The new release of "Pop the Glock" does not feature "Ready to Uff" but includes with 3 different remixes of "Pop the Glock"

"Pop the Glock" was re-released for the second time, on her debut album Sex Dreams and Denim Jeans, which was released on May 31, 2010.

== Track listing ==
A1. "Pop the Glock" – 3:29
A2. "Pop the Glock" (SebastiAn remix) – 2:42
B1. "Ready to Uff" – 3:28
B2. "Ready to Uff" (TV track) - 3:26
