= MCs Can Kiss =

Single by Uffie

from the album Sex Dreams and Denim Jeans
- Released: January 12, 2010
- Genre: Hip house
- Length: 3:09
- Label: Ed Banger Records; Elektra Records
- Songwriters: Uffie, Feadz / Mr. Oizo
- Producer: Mr. Oizo

Uffie singles chronology
| "Pop the Glock" (2009) | "MCs Can Kiss" (2010) | "ADD SUV" (2010) |

Remix covers
- Mike D Remix Version

Alternative cover
- DSL Remix feat. Mademoiselle Yulia Version

"MCs Can Kiss" is a single from French-American singer Uffie's debut studio album Sex Dreams and Denim Jeans (2010). The single was written by Uffie and Feadz and produced by Mr. Oizo. It was released digitally on January 12, 2010 and as a 12" vinyl on February 1, 2010, via Ed Banger Records and Because Music. "MCs Can Kiss" contains a sample from "Night Drive" by Giorgio Moroder and includes remixes by Starkey and Zombie Disco Squad.

On March 11, 2010, a remix by Mike D was released as a free download through Uffie's official website. A remix by labelmate DSL featuring Japanese DJ Mademoiselle Yulia was released to iTunes on September 29, 2010.

"MCs Can Kiss" was a surprise underground hit in Japan, peaking at number 48 in the Japan Hot 100 and also managed to successfully chart in France as well.

== Reception ==
MCs Can Kiss received positive reviews describing it as "an old school soundclash of heavy beats and sharp rhymes" that "shows off the French-American's ballsy schtick to full effect." BBC labeled it as "tremendous", while Gigwise went on to say that the single was "a razor-sharp lyrical assault with enough bombast to fuel the war in Afghanistan."

== Track listing ==
Digital Release

1. "MCs Can Kiss" (Original) — 3:09
2. "MCs Can Kiss" (Starkey Redid) — 4:19
3. "MCs Can Kiss" (Zombie Disco Squad Remix) — 5:54
4. "MCs Can Kiss" (Zombie Disco Squad Dub) — 5:57

12" Single
A1. "MCs Can Kiss" (Original) — 3:09
A2. "MCs Can Kiss" (Starkey Redid) — 4:19
B1. "MCs Can Kiss" (Zombie Disco Squad Remix) — 5:54
B2. "MCs Can Kiss" (Zombie Disco Squad Dub) — 5:57

Digital Remix

1. "MCs Can Kiss" (Mike D Remix) — 2:53

Digital Remix

1. "MCs Can Kiss" feat. Mademoiselle Yulia (DSL Remix) — 4:11

== Charts ==
| Chart (2010) | Peak Position |
|---|---|
| French Singles Chart | 97 |
| Japan Hot 100 | 48 |
| Japan Adult Contemporary Airplay | 88 |
