= Vandroid (soundtrack) =

Soundtrack album
- Released: May 6, 2014
- Genres: Electronic, Synthwave, Electro, Soundtrack
- Label: Ed Banger Records

Vandroid is a 2014 soundtrack album released by French electronic music label Ed Banger Records as the musical counterpart to the Vandroid comic-book series. The album features original music by Krazy Baldhead, Mr Flash, Busy P, Feadz and 40106, with the soundtrack originating as part of a multimedia project based around the fictional history of a supposedly lost 1980s science-fiction action film.

The music project preceded the comic-book series. In 2010, Vice featured a remix of the track "Master and Slave" by Yuksek and reported that Van She Tech, Fred Falke, Boy 8-Bit and Siriusmo had also been invited to remix material from the project. The full soundtrack was subsequently developed in association with artists from Ed Banger Records and released in 2014 alongside the Vandroid comics.

== Background and development ==
Vandroid was conceived as a multimedia project framed around the fictional rediscovery of an unfinished 1984 science-fiction action film and its accompanying synthesizer soundtrack. The project's invented history presented the screenplay and recordings as surviving material from a film production that had been abandoned following a studio fire.

The music was one of the earliest publicly released elements of the project. In December 2010, Vice included Yuksek's remix of "Master and Slave" in its Creators Remix Roundup. The publication described Vandroid as a project involving an early-synth soundtrack and identified Van She Tech, Fred Falke, Boy 8-Bit and Siriusmo alongside Yuksek as remixers of the material.

The project was later expanded into a comic-book series created by Nick Demetris Nicola, Tommy Lee Edwards, Noah Smith and Dan McDaid. Nicola developed the original Vandroid music and concept before introducing the project to Edwards, who subsequently worked with Smith and McDaid to develop the comic-book series, published by Dark Horse Comics in 2014. In March of that year, French electronic-music publication Stop The Noise described Vandroid as a multimedia film, music and comics project and reported that an album was in development.

Ahead of the soundtrack's release, French music magazine Tsugi featured Busy P's track "Fermeture" on 30 April 2014, describing its 8-bit-influenced sound as well suited to Vandroid's combination of comics and music. The same day, French cultural publication Konbini also covered the track, reporting that it had been produced with Boston Bun and identifying Krazy Baldhead, Mr Flash, Feadz and 40106 among the soundtrack's other contributors.

The completed 14-track soundtrack was released by Ed Banger Records in 2014. AllMusic later described Vandroid as a collection inspired by the comic book, noting contributions from Feadz and Mr Flash in its coverage of Busy P.

== Music and style ==
The soundtrack draws on electronic music associated with 1980s science-fiction cinema. Harder Blogger Faster characterised the album as a mixture of science-fiction-influenced electro and synthwave, describing Krazy Baldhead's opening track "Start" as combining an 8-bit-style melody with synthesizers and Mr Flash's "Acceleration" as driving synth-pop.

The review noted the stylistic variation across the record, describing Feadz's "Party" as combining tropical and 8-bit elements and highlighting the more cosmic character of Krazy Baldhead's "Romance" and "Destruction". Busy P closes the album with "Fermeture", which the publication described as combining sparse percussion with brittle electronic melodies.

Tsugi similarly commented on the sound of "Fermeture", describing the track as drawing on 8-bit music while giving it a slightly unsettling character, and considered the sound appropriate to Vandroid's combination of comics and music.

== Critical reception ==
Harder Blogger Faster gave Vandroid a rating of four out of five. Reviewer Andrew Rafter singled out Feadz's "Repair" and "Party" as highlights and also praised 40106's "Time Is Running Out". He regarded the album as a strong collection of futuristic electronic music and considered it among Ed Banger Records' more forward-looking compilations of the period.

Prior to the album's release, Tsugi gave favourable attention to Busy P's "Fermeture", commenting on its 8-bit-influenced and uneasy sound and its compatibility with the science-fiction multimedia concept.

== Track listing ==
Vandroid
No.	Title	Artist	Length
1.	"Start"	Krazy Baldhead	2:09
2.	"Acceleration"	Mr Flash	2:48
3.	"C.O.N.T.R.O.L"	Busy P	2:50
4.	"Repair"	Feadz	3:11
5.	"Party"	Feadz	3:21
6.	"Sex Machine"	40106	3:08
7.	"Romance"	Krazy Baldhead	3:17
8.	"Memories"	Mr Flash	5:01
9.	"Payback"	Mr Flash	2:57
10.	"Destruction"	Krazy Baldhead	3:15
11.	"Time Is Running Out"	40106	2:50
12.	"Humanity"	Feadz	3:04
13.	"Battle"	Mr Flash	2:49
14.	"Fermeture"	Busy P	1:56

== Credits ==
Credits are adapted from the album's official release information.

- Nick Demetris Nicola – songwriter; soundtrack concept
- P. A. Grison (Krazy Baldhead) – songwriter, producer
- Gilles Bousquet (Mr Flash) – songwriter, producer
- Pavle Kovacevic – songwriter, producer
- Fred Falke – songwriter
- Pedro Winter (Busy P) – songwriter, production
- Boston Bun – additional production
- F. Pianta (Feadz) – songwriter, producer
- J. Mattar – producer
- Mike Silver (Mickey Moonlight) – songwriter, producer
- //DIY – artwork
- Precise Mastering – mastering

== Follow-up ==
A follow-up album, Vandroid 2.0, was released on 27 January 2025. It includes new remixes by Tonebox, ALEX, Droid Bishop, Rogue VHS, Adieu Aru, Waveshaper and Fred Falke, together with the earlier "Master and Slave" remixes by Van She Tech, Yuksek, Siriusmo and Boy 8-Bit.
