= Difficult (Uffie song) =

Single by Uffie

from the album Sex Dreams and Denim Jeans
- Released: October 18, 2010
- Recorded: 2009
- Genre: Electropop
- Length: 2:56
- Label: Ed Banger, Because, Elektra
- Songwriters: Fabien Pianta, Sebastian Akchoté
- Producer: SebastiAn

Uffie singles chronology
"ADD SUV" (2010)	"Difficult" (2010)	"Wordy Rappinghood" (2011)

"Difficult" is the fourth single from French-American singer Uffie's debut studio album, Sex Dreams and Denim Jeans (2010). The single was produced by Uffie's label-mate and friend SebastiAn and was released by Ed Banger Records, Because Music and Elektra Records on October 18, 2010. Remixes by SebastiAn and Azari & III were included in the release.

== Release ==
In July 2010 DJ Kissy Sell Out premiered a remix of "Difficult", titled the Kissy Klub Version, on his BBC Radio 1 show and made the track available to download for free from his blog.

On August 11, 2010 Ed Banger Records confirmed through their Facebook page that Uffie's next single to be released would be "Difficult", produced by SebastiAn. It was then announced that "Difficult" would be released as an EP on October 18, 2010, through Ed Banger Records, Elektra Records and Because Music, containing remixes from SebastiAn and Azari & III.

The remix provided by SebastiAn titled "2006 Parties Remix", reached number 1 on The Hype Machine the day of being released.

Uffie announced through her official blog that a music video for "Difficult" would begin shooting on September 9, 2010. The music video was later confirmed to be directed by French filmmakers AB/CD/CD and was released on October 6, 2010.

The song contains a sample from "Love of the Hurtin' Kind" by Claudja Barry.

== Music video ==
The video, directed by AB/CD/CD, features Uffie walking through a school hallway, as each door leads her to the same but alternately changed hallways. By the end of the video Uffie finds herself trapped behind the doors.

== Track listing ==
Digital Release

1. "Difficult" (Original Version) – 2:56
2. "Difficult" (SebastiAn "2006 Parties" Remix) - 3:51
3. "Difficult" (Azari & III Remix) - 6:06

12" Single

A1. "Difficult" (Original Version) – 2:56
A2. "Difficult" (SebastiAn "2006 Parties" Remix) - 3:51
B1. "Difficult" (Azari & III Remix) - 6:06
