= TV track =

A TV track is usually a song or a sequence used as accompaniment during a scene or visual sequence on television (i.e., commercials or television show). If a song has vocals, part of the vocals may be removed for voice-over or dialogue, while the instrumental track is left intact. Some notable examples are the songs: "Complicated", "Sk8er Boi", "I'm with You", and "Losing Grip" from the Japanese special bonus edition of the 2002 album Let Go by Avril Lavigne, or "Ready to Uff" from the 2006 extended play Pop the Glock/Ready to Uff, and "Brand New Car" from the 2007 single "First Love", both by Uffie, all used as TV tracks. A TV track also may be an instrumental with the official background vocals or chorus over it which singers use to perform.
