= The B-Suite =

Studio album by Krazy Baldhead
- Released: 11 May 2009
- Genre: Electro
- Length: 48:32
- Label: Ed Banger Records

Krazy Baldhead chronology
| The B-Suite (2009) | The Noise in the Sky (2012) |

The B-Suite is the debut album of French electro artist Krazy Baldhead. The album is split into four "movements" which have from three to five parts.

Professional ratings
Review scores
| Source | Rating |
|---|---|
| XLR8R | 6.5/10 |

== Track listing ==
- 1st Movement
1. Part 1 – 4:10
2. Part 2 – 2:19
3. Part 3 – 1:57
4. Part 4 – 3:24
- 2nd Movement
1. Part 1 – 2:55
2. Part 2 (aka "Time") (featuring Tes) – 2:15
3. Part 3 – 1:40
4. Part 4 – 4:05
- 3rd Movement
1. Part 1 (a.k.a. "Katana Powa") (featuring Big-O and Yulia) – 3:34
2. Part 2 – 3:38
3. Part 3 (a.k.a. "Sweet Night") (featuring Outlines) - 4:43
- 4th Movement
1. Part 1 – 1:37
2. Part 2 (a.k.a. "Saturnication") – 3:49
3. Part 3 – 1:53
4. Part 4 – 2:26
5. Part 5 (a.k.a. "The End") (featuring Beat Assailant) – 4:08
