= ADD SUV =

Single by Uffie featuring Pharrell

from the album Sex Dreams and Denim Jeans
- Released: April 15, 2010
- Recorded: 2009
- Length: 3:29
- Label: Ed Banger; Because; Elektra
- Songwriters: Anna-Catherine Hartley; Mirwais Ahmadzaï; Pharrell Williams
- Producer: Mirwais

Uffie singles chronology
"MCs Can Kiss" (2010)	"ADD SUV" (2010)	"Difficult" (2010)

Pharrell singles chronology
"Popular Demand (Popeyes)" (2010)	"ADD SUV" (2010)	"One (Your Name)" (2010)

"ADD SUV" is the second single from French-American singer Uffie's debut studio album Sex Dreams and Denim Jeans (2010). The single was produced by Mirwais and features Pharrell Williams performing guest vocals. "ADD SUV" peaked at number 28 on the UK Independent Singles Chart.

== Release ==
On April 15, 2010, Uffie's single "ADD SUV" featuring Pharrell Williams premiered on BBC Radio 1. Uffie describes "ADD SUV" as "poking fun at the rap fraternity's obsession with possessions, particularly their cars...", but was more seriously influenced by the 1966 novel Valley of the Dolls, which Uffie was reading at the time she wrote the song.

A music video began to shoot for "ADD SUV" in Los Angeles starring both Uffie and Pharrell Williams and directed by Nathalie Canguilhem on April 9, 2010, and was released on June 14, 2010. It was also announced that "ADD SUV" will be released accompanied with remixes by Armand Van Helden and Hudson Mohawke on May 17, 2010, in France, May 31, 2010, in most European and Asian countries, June 7, 2010, in the United Kingdom and Ireland and June 8, 2010, in the United States.

"ADD SUV" charted very successfully in the UK, peaking at number six on the UK Independent Singles Breakers Chart and charted in France as well.

The Armand Van Helden Vocal Mix is featured on Hed Kandi's 2010 remix album.

== Reception ==
The single received positive reviews from New York Post, Prefix Magazine, Spin Magazine, among others. BBC praised the track as a "sarky bling-killing single". With so much anticipation around "ADD SUV" the song debuted at number one on The Hype Machine.

== Track listing ==
Digital Release

1. ADD SUV (Original Version) — 3:12
2. ADD SUV (Armand Van Helden Vocal Remix) — 5:17
3. ADD SUV (Hudson Mohawke's Spam Fajita Remix) — 3:26
4. ADD SUV (Armand Van Helden Club Remix) — 4:44

12" Single

A1. ADD SUV (Original Version) — 3:12
A2. ADD SUV (Hudson Mohawke's Spam Fajita Remix) — 3:26
B1. ADD SUV (Armand Van Helden Vocal Remix) — 5:17
B2. ADD SUV (Armand Van Helden Club Remix) — 4:44

== Charts ==
Chart (2010)	Peak Position	Weeks on Chart
UK Dance Singles Chart	31	4
UK Independent Singles Breakers Chart	6	4
UK Independent Singles Chart	28	5
US Billboard Dance Songs/Global	29	5
