= DJ Mehdi =

French DJ and music producer (1977–2011)

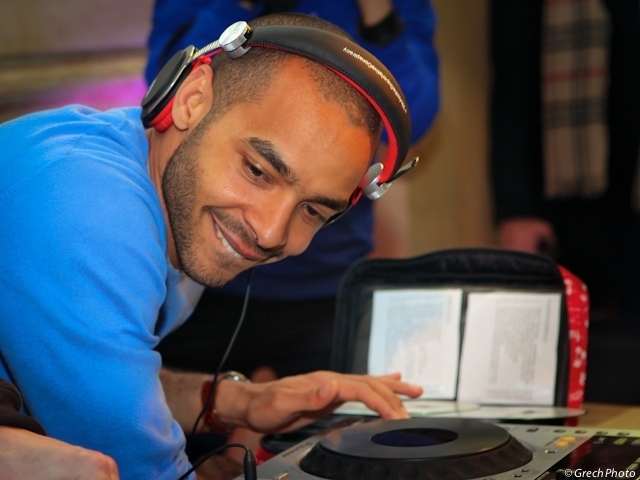
- DJ Mehdi in 2011

Background information
- Born: Mehdi Favéris-Essadi; 20 January 1977; Asnières-sur-Seine, France
- Died: 13 September 2011 (aged 34) Paris, France
- Genres: Hip hop; house
- Occupations: DJ; music producer
- Years active: 1996–2011
- Labels: Ed Banger; Because

Mehdi Favéris-Essadi (20 January 1977 – 13 September 2011), better known by his stage name DJ Mehdi, was a French-Tunisian hip hop and house music producer and DJ. He was signed to the label Ed Banger Records, founded by his friend Pedro Winter, in which he released in 2006 his album Lucky Boy, also the label's debut album.

== Biography ==
Mehdi was born of French and Tunisian background in Hauts-de-Seine, the northwestern suburbs of Paris. He was a former disc jockey of the groups Different Teep (ex-group of Manu Key and Lil Jahson), Idéal J and former member of the collective the Mafia K'1 Fry. He was also a long time the quasi-appointed producer of the group 113 and carried out nearly all the production of the albums for Different Teep and Karlito. Amid his work, Mehdi had remixed various electronic acts and composition soundtracks for many French and international films.

After having been recognized for his efforts and budding into one of the French underground hip hop music scene's premier producers, DJ Mehdi pushed boundaries by mixing hip hop and electronic music. He collaborated with such notable artists as Daft Punk, Cassius, MC Solaar, Futura 2000, Asian Dub Foundation and Chromeo among others.

Signing to cross-genre label Ed Banger Records, Mehdi and Pedro Winter (a.k.a. Busy P) were working on various disco-hop sounds starting in 1997. Together they hosted a very successful monthly night at former Paris nightspot Pulp. About his experience at the club he stated, "I like to be the DJ, I love it so much. I love to try new things. You would never get into this business to be bored, or you would hope not."

Mehdi released his first full-length LP in 2002, The Story of Espion, followed by his second album, Lucky Boy, in August 2006. The popularity of cross genre hip hop into such areas as indie and electronic music, popularization by Timbaland and other labels from the United States in more recent years helped to bridge the gap between dance genres.

Mehdi's single "I Am Somebody" was used in a 2007 American commercial for XM Radio. Prior to his death, DJ Mehdi was part of a group of friends and DJ's collectively known as "Club 75" which includes Cassius, Busy P and Xavier de Rosnay (Justice). In 2010, he launched a project in collaboration with Riton, a close friend, titled "Carte Blanche".

Mehdi, being a fan of J Dilla, created a mixtape tribute entitled "Loukoums", which was released in 2006. The mixtape is based on the concept of J Dilla's instrumental album Donuts, released the same year.

Since the death of DJ Mehdi in 2011, this mixtape (initially pressed in 200 copies for promotional and family framework) is now available for free on the Ed Banger Records SoundCloud page.

== Death ==
Mehdi died on 13 September 2011, when the skylight of his Paris home collapsed while he was celebrating Riton's birthday with a group of friends on the roof. Mehdi was the only fatality, while three others were injured.

== Discography ==
=== Albums ===
Ideal J

- Original Mc's Sur Une MIssion (1996)
- Le Combat Continue (1998)

113

- Ni barreaux, ni barrières, ni frontières (1998)
- Les Princes De La Ville (1999)
- Fout La Merde (2002)

Karlito

- Contenu Sous Pression (2001)

Mapei

- Cocoa Butter Diaries (2009)

Solo work

- The Story Of Espion (2002)
- Des Friandises Pour Ta Bouche (2005)
- Loukoums (2006)
- Lucky Boy (2006)
- Lucky Boy at Night (2007)

=== Singles ===
- "Wonderbra" ("Paradisiaque", Mc Solaar) (1997)
- "Classik" / "Au Fond De Mon Cœur" / "Esclave 2000" ("Touche D'Espoir", Assassin) (2000)
- "À L'Anciene" / "Les Points Sur Les I Remix" ("Les Points Sur Les I", Intouchable) (2000)
- "Le Ssem" / "Le Jeu de La Mort" ("La Vie Avant La Mort", Rohff) (2001)
- "Couleur Ebène" ("Ouest Side", Booba) (2006)
- "I am Somebody" ("I am Somebody", DJ Mehdi, real: So_Me) (2007)
- "Signatune" (2007)

=== Remixes ===
- 1997 Koma – "Realite Rap" (DJ Mehdi RMX)
- 1998 113 – "Les Evadés" (Remix)
- 1998 Fabe – "Quand j'serai grand…" (DJ Mehdi Remix)
- 1999 Cassius – "Feeling for You" (Cambridge Circus Mix)
- 2000 Joakim Lone Octet – "Oleg Dans Les Bois" (DJ Mehdi Remix)
- 2000 Manu Key – "Si Tu Savais" (Remix)
- 2001 Akhenaton – "K (AKH)" (DJ Mehdi Remix/DJ Mehdi Instrumental Remix)
- 2002 Next Evidence – "Dance On" (DJ Mehdi Remix/DJ Mehdi's Dub)
- 2002 Etienne de Crécy – "Out of My Hands" (DJ Mehdi Remix)
- 2003 Asian Dub Foundation – "Fortress Europe" (Techno Organisation Remix)
- 2004 Wayne Shorter – "Footprints" (Dub a.k.a. DJ Mehdi Remix)
- 2006 Architecture in Helsinki – "In Case We Die"
- 2006 New Young Pony Club – "Ice Cream" (DJ Mehdi Remix)
- 2007 Outlines- "Just a Lil' Lovin" (album)
- 2008 Sam Sparro – "21st Century Life" (DJ Mehdi Secret Disco Dub)
- 2009 Erol Alkan & Boys Noize – "Death Suite" (DJ Mehdi's Simple Acid Edit)
- 2009 Miike Snow – "Burial" (DJ Mehdi Remix)
- 2009 Miike Snow – ANDY FING P.
- 2009 Uffie – "Pop the Glock" (DJ Mehdi's "Casco" Edit)
- 2010 Zombie Nation – Overshoot (DJ Mehdi Remix)

=== Mixtapes ===
- Loukoums (2006)
