= Sex Dreams and Denim Jeans =

Studio album by Uffie
- Released: June 14, 2010
- Recorded: 2005–2010
- Genres: Synth-pop; electronica; hip hop
- Length: 48:03
- Labels: Ed Banger; Because
- Producers: Feadz; J-Mat; Mirwais; Mr. Oizo; Sebastian

Uffie chronology
Sex Dreams and Denim Jeans (2010)	Tokyo Love Hotel (2019)

Singles from Sex Dreams and Denim Jeans
- 1. "Pop the Glock" Released: November 30, 2009; 2. "MCs Can Kiss" Released: January 12, 2010; 3. "ADD SUV" Released: April 15, 2010; 4. "Difficult" Released: October 18, 2010

Sex Dreams and Denim Jeans is the debut studio album by French-American singer Uffie. It was released on June 14, 2010, by Ed Banger Records and Because Music. Produced by Feadz, J-Mat, Mr. Oizo, Mirwais and Sebastian, the album features guest appearances by Pharrell Williams and Mattie Safer of The Rapture, includes an "adaptation" of The Velvet Underground's "Rock & Roll" and a cover of Siouxsie and the Banshees' "Hong Kong Garden", which Uffie cited as one of her favorite songs.

The album peaked at number 17 on the Billboard Dance/Electronic Albums chart and number 18 on the UK Dance Albums Chart. Although reviews for the album were mixed, it was included on year-end critics' lists by several publications and was nominated at the 2011 French Victoires de la Musique for Best Electronic Album.

In 2012 it was awarded a silver certification from the Independent Music Companies Association which indicated sales of at least 20,000 copies throughout Europe.

Since the release of the album, Uffie's music is said to have "had a lasting and widespread influence in the 2010s".

== Release ==
Professional ratings
Aggregate scores
Source	Rating
Metacritic	48/100
Review scores
Source	Rating
AllMusic	2.5/5 stars
Drowned in Sound	3/10
Gigwise	7/10
The Guardian	2/5 stars
musicOMH	4.5/5 stars
NME	0/10
Q	1/5 stars
Rolling Stone	3.5/5 stars
Spin	5/10
Tiny Mix Tapes	0/5 stars

Uffie's record label Ed Banger Records first stated in late 2006 that her debut album would be released "mid-to-late 2007", then "sometime in 2008". Hectic traveling and touring schedules, her marriage and divorce, news of her pregnancy and growing as an artist delayed the release of the album. She stated that her new sound is very different with a much more mature sound and there would be more singing on the album than her previous EPs. She describes the album as "schizophrenic" and "worth the wait". On October 3, 2009, Busy P, founder and owner of Ed Banger Records, stated that Uffie's album had just been completed and was due out in spring 2010. Feadz, J-Mat, Mr. Oizo, Mirwais and Sebastian served as producers on the album, while both Pharrell Williams and Mattie Safer from The Rapture made guest appearances.

Before the release of the album there was a contract dispute between Uffie and Lou Reed as to who would be credited as the writer of the title track, "Sex Dreams and Denim Jeans", which once again delayed the album from "early 2010" to June 15, 2010. The track uses an instrumental sample of The Velvet Underground's song "Rock & Roll" and the only way Reed would allow her to use the sample was by calling "Sex Dreams and Denim Jeans" an "adaptation" of "Rock & Roll" and receiving the sole credit as the writer of the song as well. This dispute delayed the album by about six months; Uffie branded Reed "fucking difficult", and when asked if he had heard the song, she stated, "Yes he has, he had to clear it. And it was a very not nice experience dealing with him, I have to say. [...] I don't know what this guy's problem is but on the credits I think it even says something like he wrote it. He gets everything."

In a later interview with BBC Radio 1, Uffie stated that the album was heavily acid-influenced and that Mirwais produced five tracks, while Feadz, Mr. Oizo and Sebastian produced a couple of tracks each. She also went on to refer to the album as "the end of my crazy youth and the intro to my adult life." "Pop the Glock", "First Love" and "Brand New Car" were all previously released as singles at least three years prior to the album's release.

== Singles ==
"MCs Can Kiss" was the first single released from Sex Dreams and Denim Jeans and was released on January 12, 2010, to positive reviews from critics, describing it as "an old school soundclash of heavy beats and sharp rhymes" and stating it "shows off the French-American's ballsy schtick to full effect." Gigwise called the song a "razor-sharp lyrical assault with enough bombast to fuel the war in Afghanistan", while BBC Music dubbed it a "sarky bling-killing single". "MCs Can Kiss" peaked at number 48 on the Japan Hot 100 and at number 97 in France.

The lead single from Sex Dreams and Denim Jeans, "ADD SUV" (featuring Pharrell Williams), premiered on BBC Radio 1 on April 15, 2010. "ADD SUV" was described as being about "[p]oking fun at the rap fraternity's obsession with possessions, particularly their cars", while Uffie stated that the song was inspired by the 1967 film Valley of the Dolls. A music video for "ADD SUV", filmed in Los Angeles and starring both Uffie and Williams, was directed by Nathalie Canguilhem and released on June 14, 2010. The single was praised by critics from Prefix, Spin, and BBC, and peaked at number 28 on the UK Independent Singles Chart. Singles "MCs Can Kiss", "ADD SUV", "First Love" and "Pop the Glock" also managed to chart in various countries such as France, Japan, and the UK.

Ed Banger Records confirmed through their Facebook page on August 11, 2010, that Uffie's next single to be released would be "Difficult", produced by label-mate and friend Sebastian. It was later announced that "Difficult" would be released as an EP on October 18, 2010, containing remixes by Sebastian and Azari & III. A music video for the single was also announced to be released on October 6, 2010.

== Track listing ==
No.	Title	Lyrics	Music	Producer(s)	Length
1.	"Pop the Glock"	Anna Hartley; Fabien Pianta	Pianta; Johann Mattar	Feadz; J-Mat	3:30
2.	"Art of Uff"	Hartley; Pianta	Quentin Dupieux	Mr. Oizo	3:05
3.	"ADD SUV" (featuring Pharrell Williams)	Hartley; Williams	Mirwais Ahmadzaï	Mirwais	3:29
4.	"Give It Away"	Pianta	Pianta; Mattar	Feadz; J-Mat	3:20
5.	"MCs Can Kiss"	Pianta^{[a]}	Dupieux^{[a]}	Mr. Oizo	3:09
6.	"Difficult"	Pianta	Sébastien Akchoté	Sebastian	2:56
7.	"First Love"	Hartley; Pianta	Dupieux	Mr. Oizo	4:57
8.	"Sex Dreams and Denim Jeans"	Lou Reed	Reed	Mirwais	2:37
9.	"Our Song"	Pianta	Pianta; Dupieux	Feadz; Mr. Oizo	3:19
10.	"Illusion of Love" (featuring Mattie Safer)	Hartley; Matthew Safer; Ahmadzaï	Ahmadzaï	Mirwais	5:19
11.	"Neuneu"	Pianta	Dupieux	Mr. Oizo	2:30
12.	"Brand New Car"	Pianta	Pianta	Feadz	3:19
13.	"Hong Kong Garden"	John McKay; Kenneth Ian Morris; Steven John Bailey; Susan Janet Ballion	McKay; Morris; Bailey; Ballion	Mirwais	2:20
14.	"Ricky"	Pianta	Pianta; Mattar	Feadz; J-Mat	4:12

North American digital deluxe edition bonus tracks
No.	Title	Lyrics	Music	Producer(s)	Length
15.	"Pop the Glock" (Mirwais Pop Remix)	Hartley; Pianta	Pianta; Mattar	Feadz; J-Mat; Mirwais^{[b]}	2:30
16.	"ADD SUV" (Carte Blanche Remix) (featuring Pharrell Williams)	Hartley; Williams	Ahmadzaï	Mirwais; Carte Blanche^{[b]}	4:44
17.	"Pop the Glock" (music video)				3:30

Japanese edition bonus tracks
No.	Title	Lyrics	Music	Producer(s)	Length
15.	"Pop the Glock" (Felix da Housecat "Pink Enemy" Remix)	Hartley; Pianta	Pianta; Mattar	Feadz; J-Mat; Felix da Housecat^{[b]}	5:39
16.	"MCs Can Kiss" (Mike D Remix)	Pianta^{[a]}	Dupieux^{[a]}	Mr. Oizo; Mike D^{[b]}	2:51
17.	"ADD SUV" (Armand Van Helden Remix Vocal)	Hartley; Williams	Ahmadzaï	Mirwais; Van Helden^{[b]}	5:17
18.	"ADD SUV" (Hudson Mohawke's Spam Fajita Remix)	Hartley; Williams	Ahmadzaï	Mirwais; Mohawke^{[b]}	3:25
19.	"Message from Uffie" (video)
20.	"Pop the Glock" (music video)

Notes

- ^{^[a]} Fabien "Feadz" Pianta and Quentin "Mr. Oizo" Dupieux are credited as songwriters on "MCs Can Kiss" in the liner notes of Sex Dreams and Denim Jeans, while the liner notes of the "MCs Can Kiss" single credit Uffie and Feadz as songwriters.
- ^{^[b]} signifies a remixer

Sample credits

- "Pop the Glock" samples "Top Billin'" by Audio Two.
- "MCs Can Kiss" includes samples of "Bite This" by Roxanne Shanté and "Night Drive" by Giorgio Moroder.
- "Difficult" includes a sample of "Love of the Hurtin' Kind" by Claudja Barry.
- "First Love" includes a sample of "Don't Go" by F. R. David.
- "Sex Dreams and Denim Jeans" is an adaptation of "Rock & Roll" written by Lou Reed.

== Personnel ==
Credits adapted from the liner notes of Sex Dreams and Denim Jeans.

=== Musicians ===
- Uffie – vocals
- Pharrell Williams – vocals (track 3)
- Mirwais – keyboards, programming (tracks 3, 8, 10, 13)
- Hal Ritson – keyboards (tracks 5, 13); programming (track 5); backing vocals, additional guitar (track 8)
- Richard Adlam – keyboards (track 5); programming (tracks 5, 8, 13); drums (tracks 8, 13); backing vocals (track 8); percussion (track 13)
- Guthrie Govan – bass, guitars (tracks 8, 13)
- Mattie Safer – vocals (track 10)

=== Technical ===
- Feadz – production (tracks 1, 4, 9, 12, 14)
- J-Mat – production (tracks 1, 4, 14)
- Mr. Oizo – production (tracks 2, 5, 7, 9, 11)
- Mirwais – production, mixing (tracks 3, 8, 10, 13)
- Hal Ritson – sample recreation production (tracks 5, 8, 13)
- Richard Adlam – sample recreation production (tracks 5, 8, 13)
- Sebastian – production (track 6)

=== Artwork ===
- Nathalie Canguilhem – art direction
- Will Goodman – design
- Ysa Pérez – photography

== Charts ==
Chart (2010)	Peak position
Belgian Heatseekers Albums (Ultratop Flanders)	7
Belgian Albums (Ultratop Wallonia)	76
French Albums (SNEP)	59
German Albums (Offizielle Top 100)	77
Greek International Albums (IFPI)	43
Japanese Album Chart (Oricon)	48
Swiss Albums (Schweizer Hitparade)	62
UK Dance Albums (Official Charts)	18
UK Independent Albums (Official Charts)	31
US Heatseekers Albums (Billboard)	32
US Top Dance Albums (Billboard)	17

== Release history ==
Region	Date	Label	Ref.
France	June 14, 2010	Ed Banger; Because	
United Kingdom	June 14, 2010	Ed Banger; Because	
Germany	June 18, 2010	Warner	
United States	June 21, 2010	Elektra	
Japan	June 23, 2010	Warner	
