= First Love (Uffie song) =

Single by Uffie

from the album Sex Dreams and Denim Jeans
- B-side: "Brand New Car"
- Released: June 29, 2007
- Recorded: 2006–2007
- Length: 4:56
- Label: Ed Banger
- Songwriter(s): Uffie; Feadz
- Producer(s): Mr. Oizo

Uffie singles chronology
"Hot Chick" (2006)	"First Love" (2007)	"Pop the Glock" (2009)

"First Love" (stylized as "F1rst Love") is a song by French-American singer Uffie. It was released as a single on June 29, 2007, by Ed Banger Records and includes the B-side "Brand New Car" as well as a TV track version of "Brand New Car". Mr. Oizo produced "First Love", using a beat sampled from the 1987 song "Don't Go" by F.R. David, while Feadz produced "Brand New Car". The single peaked at number 18 in Belgium.

Both "First Love" and "Brand New Car" are two of three previously released tracks (the other being "Pop the Glock") that were included on Uffie's debut studio album Sex Dreams and Denim Jeans, which was released on June 14, 2010.

In 2023 the single’s artwork was displayed in the subway station of the Pigalle district in Paris ahead of the Ed Banger ‘XX’ reunion show, featuring Uffie performing alongside her former labelmates for the first time in more than a decade.

== Track listing ==
- French 12-inch single

A1. "First Love" – 4:57
B1. "Brand New Car" – 3:18
B2. "Brand New Car" (TV Track) – 3:57

== Charts ==
Chart (2007)	Peak position
Belgium Dance (Ultratop 50 Wallonia)	18
