= Mr. Flash =

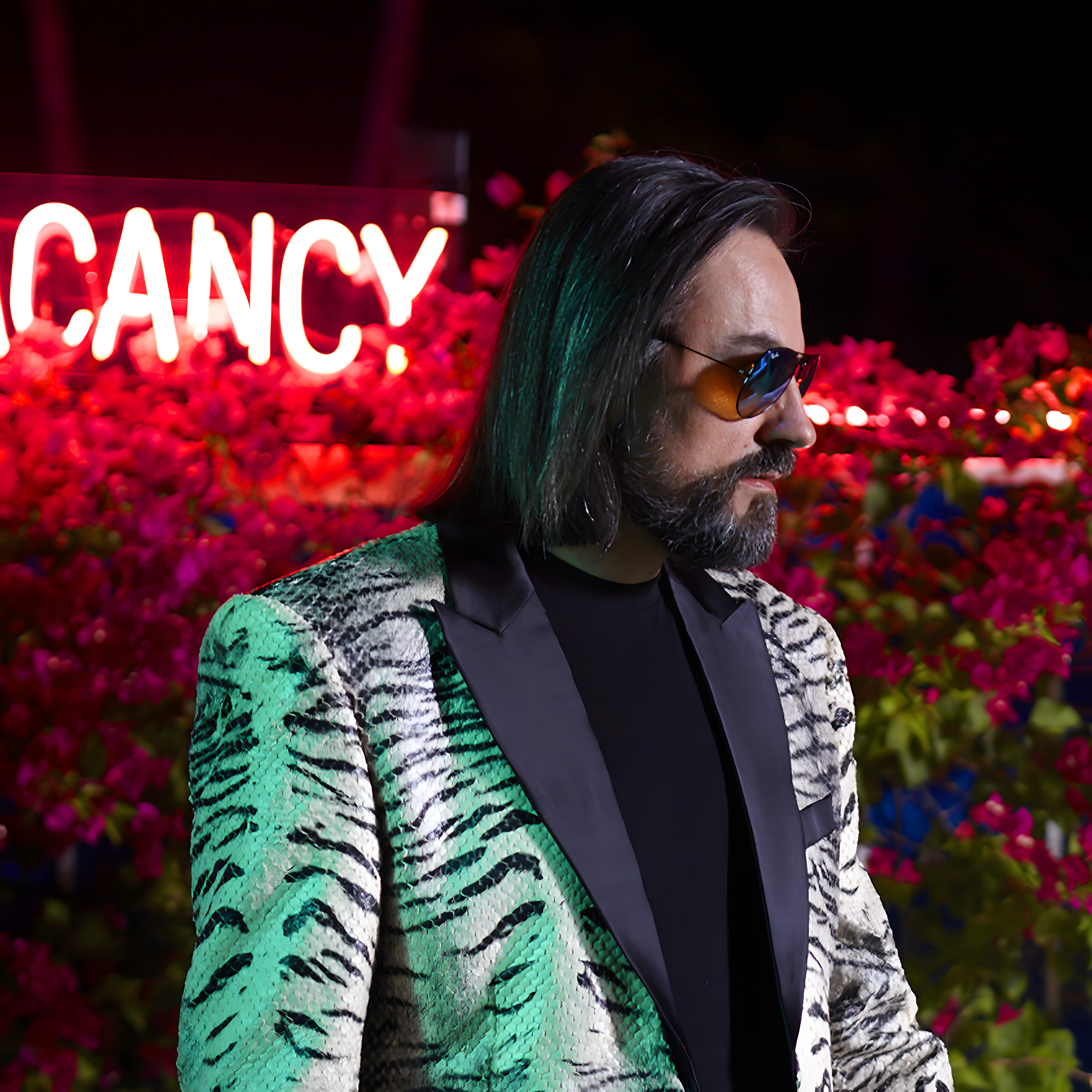
- Mr. Flash

Background information
- Born: Gilles Bousquet
- Origin: Paris, France
- Genres: Electro, hip-hop
- Occupations: Producer, DJ, Composer, Arranger, Head of Heartbreakers Records
- Instruments: Drums, Keyboard, Guitar, Bass
- Years active: 1999-present
- Labels: Ed Banger; Because; Heartbreakers Records
- Website: Mr. Flash on SoundCloud heartbreakersrecords.com

Gilles Bousquet (French pronunciation: [ʒil buskɛ]), known professionally as Mr. Flash, is a French musician, record producer and DJ. He signed on the French electronic music label Ed Banger Records in 2003 and released the track "Radar Rider", which is also the first release of the label. In 2014, he released his first album Sonic Crusader. In 2024, Mr. Flash released Santa Cruz, an imaginary soundtrack album, in very limited quantities, the first official release on his Heartbreakers record label.

== Career ==
Gilles Bousquet, professionally known as Mr. Flash, began his musical education at the French Musical Conservatory, where he learned music theory and piano. He later integrated the Tama Drum School in Aix-en-Provence, graduating after 10 years of practicing drums. From a young age, he aspired to work in the film industry, influenced by his father who ran a film society in Algeria during the 1960s.

After graduating from school in 1990, Mr. Flash studied filmmaking and art at the University Sorbonne Paris. He worked full-time as a key grip on music videos, commercials, short films, and movies. Eight years later, he joined Delabel (a Virgin Records sub-label) as a DA Music Assistant, meeting several musicians from the French Touch movement, including Motorbass and Air. He learned the technical rudiments and aspects of music studio recordings and artist development carrier. During his free time he mentioned to have kept his musical passion alive doing simple demo for his own pleasure using an Akai sampler without any specific purposes or goals.

In 1999, Mr. Flash met the French Hip-Hop band TTC and produced their first independent single "Game Over '99" and brought them to the interest of Bid Dada (Ninja Tune HipHop sub-label) whom then release their album « Ceci N’est Pas Un Disque » for which he produced and recorded 7 tracks.

In 2000, Mr. Flash released his first independent EP, "Le Voyage Fantastique", featuring Mike Ladd. After meeting Pedro Winter in 2003, then the manager of Daft Punk, Mr. Flash's track "Radar Rider" became the first release on Winter's Ed Banger Records. Mr. Flash has produced tracks for various artists, including Mos Def, and produced Sébastien Tellier's 2012 album My God Is Blue. In 2018, he released "The Wild, The Beautiful and the Damned", the first EP of the group Faded Away, formed with Nic Nicola.

Key tracks like "Motorcycle Boy," "Disco Dynamite," "Flesh," "Midnight Blue," "T.R.O.Y.," "Couscous," "Domino Part A/B," and "Sonic Crusader" highlight his genre-blending style. Eventually, Mr. Flash released his first album, "Sonic Crusader", in 2014. He moved to Los Angeles for five years and returned to France in 2020. He then created his own label, Heartbreakers Records, which he described as "the perfect continuation of his musical career". Using all the skills he learned during these years (from graphic design, to video editing, to music productions) and « conceived as a way to restore the feeling of exclusivity music once had », he decided to produce by now everything by himself, giving life to his graphic side while being the logical sequel to his music, from Producer to Consumer.

In 2024, Mr. Flash released "Santa Cruz," an imaginary soundtrack album, as the first official Heartbreakers Records release.

== Discography ==
=== Albums ===
- Monsieur Sexe (Ed Banger Records, 2005)
- Sonic Crusader (Ed Banger Records, 2014)
- Santa Cruz (Heartbreakers Records, 2024)
- Santa Cruz..More (Heartbreakers Records, 2025)

=== EPs ===
- Le Voyage Fantastique (Lust Island, 2001)
- Blood, Sweat & Tears (Ed Banger Records, 2010)
- Midnight Blue featuring Surahn (Ed Banger Records, 2014)
- Bagheera featuring Lady Leshurr (Ed Banger Records, 2015)

=== Singles ===
- "Game Over ’99" b/w "Trop Frais" ([Cro2]ozome, 1999)
- "Radar Rider" b/w "F.I.S.T." (Ed Banger Records, 2003)
- "Supa Chick" b/w "Chop Suey" (Arcade Mode, 2005)
- "Champions" b/w "Disco Dynamite" (Ed Banger Records, 2006)

=== Compilations & Soundtracks ===
- "Radar Rider" on Ed Rec Vol. 1 (Ed Banger Records, 2006)
- "Disco Dynamite" and "Eagle Eyez" on Ed Rec Vol. 2 (Ed Banger Records, 2007)
- "Over The Top" on Ed Rec Vol. 3 (Ed Banger Records, 2008)
- "Acceleration", "Memories", "Payback" and "Battle" on Vandroid (Ed Banger Records, 2014)
- "Reckless" on Ed Rec Vol. X (Ed Banger Records, 2013)
- "Cream" Original Soundtrack of Clément Oberto short movie (2017)
- "Midnight Blue" featuring Surahn (Chanel & Ed Banger Records Present Midday Midnight - Ed Banger Records, 2021)

=== Productions ===
- TTC - "Nonscience", "Teste Ta Comprehension", "Subway", "Pollutions", "Champagne Sans Bulles", "Leguman", "Coffee Shop" from Ceci N'est Pas Un Disque (Big Dada, 2002)
- Mos Def - "Life in Marvelous Times", "The Embassy", "Worker's Comp" from The Ecstatic (Downtown Records, 2009)
- Sébastien Tellier - My God Is Blue (Record Makers, 2012)
- Faded Away - The Wild, the Beautiful and the Damned EP (Mr. Flash & Nic Nicola, 2017)

=== Remixes ===
- Zongamin - "Bongo Song (Mr. Flash Type C Remix)" (2005)
- Mr. Oizo - "Negatif (Mr. Flash Remix)" (2008)
- Masta Ace - "Sittin' on Chrome (Mr. Flash Sittin' on Cr02 RMX)" (2008)
- Kanye West - "Paranoid (Mr. Flash Remix)" (2009)
- Darwin Deez - "Up in the Clouds (Mr. Flash Remix)" (2010)
