= Feadz =

French music producer, DJ and songwriter

- Born: Fabien Pianta
- Origin: France
- Genres: Electronic, hip hop, techno, alternative dance, French house
- Occupations: Producer, DJ, songwriter
- Years active: 1998–present
- Labels: BPitch Control (2001-2005); Ed Banger Records (2005-present)
- Website: Feadz on Myspace

Feadz (born Fabien Pianta) is a French music producer, DJ and songwriter currently signed by French music label Ed Banger Records. He combines the genres of hip hop, electronic, techno and French house in his music and frequently collaborates with label-mate and former girlfriend Uffie.

== Career ==
Feadz began creating electronic and hip hop music in the early 1990s in Paris. He met fellow music producer Mr. Oizo in 1999 and the two began production on his album Analog Worms Attack which became extremely successful and the two toured the world to promote it. Then in 2001, after completing work with Mr. Oizo, Feadz was invited to join Ellen Allien's influential German electro record label, BPitch Control. On this label, Feadz released his first official solo work as an artist, starting with his first EP High-B in 2001. He would go on to release three more EPs on BPitch Control.

Feadz and Uffie began collaborating in early 2005, when she provided vocals for his track "Uffie & Me" (released on his Forward 4 EP). He went on to produce her first single Pop the Glock in late 2005 and they began to shop the single around to various record labels. In 2006, Busy P, owner and founder of the highly acclaimed French electro record label Ed Banger Records, heard the single and quickly offered record deals to both Feadz and Uffie. Feadz's longtime friend Mr. Oizo, was also signed to Ed Banger Records and the two produced Uffie's first five EPs from 2006-2010. Uffie became an international underground sensation, starting in 2006 with her singles Pop the Glock and Ready to Uff (produced by Mr. Oizo) in 2006, thus gaining Feadz fame.

For Ed Bangers' 2007 compilation album, Ed Rec Vol. 2 Feadz provided his track "Edwrecker", his first official solo release on the label. Then in 2008, he provided his track "Back it Up (Feat. Spank Rock)" as well as a track he produced for Uffie on Ed Rec Vol. 3. Later that year, Feadz released his first EP, Happy Meal on Ed Banger Records. His second EP for the label, People Numbers Money Business was released in the summer of 2009. Besides working with Uffie and Mr. Oizo, Feadz has worked with artists such as Justice, Krazy Baldhead, Spank Rock, etc.

He also worked alongside Mr. Oizo, Mirwais and SebastiAn to produce Uffie's highly anticipated album, Sex Dreams and Denim Jeans, released on 31 May 2010.

On 26 October 2010 Ed Banger Records announced through their official Facebook account that their next release would be a new EP by Feadz, titled "The Unfinished Feadz Fairytale".

Feadz worked with Kito & Reija Lee for his 2013 EP Electric Empire.

On 20 January 2014 Feadz's debut album, Instant Alpha, was released internationally by Ed Banger Records.

== Solo discography ==
=== EPs ===
- High-B (2001) (BPitch Control)
- On Level M (2003) (BPitch Control)
- Maxi Beef (2004) (BPitch Control)
- Forward 4 EP (2005) (BPitch Control)
- Happy Meal (2008) (Ed Banger Records)
- People Numbers Money Business (2009) (Ed Banger Records)
- The Unfinished Feadz Fairytale (2010) (Ed Banger Records)
- Feadz & Kito Electric Empire EP (2012) (Ed Banger Records)
- Feadz & Kito Electric Empire Remix EP (2013) (Ed Banger Records)
- Superseded (2016) (Ed Banger Records)

=== Compilations ===
- Edwrecker on Ed Rec Vol. 2 (2007)
- Back it Up (Feat. Spank Rock) on Ed Rec Vol. 3 (2008)
- Far From Home (Feat. Claude Violante) on Let The Children Techno (2011)
- Repair, Party and Humanity on Vandroid (2014)

=== Albums ===
- Instant Alpha (2014) (Ed Banger Records)

== Production Discography ==
=== Albums ===
- 1999: Analog Worms Attack (Mr. Oizo)
- 2010: Sex Dreams and Denim Jeans (Uffie)

=== Singles ===
- 2006: "Pop the Glock" (Uffie on Pop the Glock/Ready to Uff)
- 2006: "In Charge" (Uffie on Hot Chick/In Charge)
- 2007: "Brand New Car" (Uffie on Suited and Looted)
- 2008: "Robot Oeuf" (Uffie on Ed Rec Vol. 3)
- 2009: "Pop the Glock" (re-release) (Uffie on Pop the Glock)
- 2010: "Pop the Glock" (re-release) (Uffie on Sex Dreams and Denim Jeans)
- 2010: "Give It Away" (Uffie on Sex Dreams and Denim Jeans)
- 2010: "Our Song" (Uffie on Sex Dreams and Denim Jeans)
- 2010: "Ricky" (Uffie on Sex Dreams and Denim Jeans)
