= Pop the Glock =

Single by Uffie

from the album Sex Dreams and Denim Jeans
- Released: November 30, 2009
- Recorded: 2005
- Genre: Electroclash
- Length: 3:29
- Label: Ed Banger
- Songwriters: Uffie, Feadz
- Producer: Feadz

Uffie singles chronology
"First Love" (2007)	"Pop the Glock" (2009)	"MCs Can Kiss" (2010)

Music video
- "Pop the Glock" on YouTube

"Pop the Glock" is a single by French-American recording artist Uffie. The re-released single was released as a 12" vinyl on November 30, 2009. "Pop the Glock" was Uffie's first single and an international underground hit. It was originally released in early 2006 by Ed Banger Records on the Pop the Glock/Ready to Uff EP.

The original release gained Uffie attention from the media, fans and critics alike and landed her a record deal with French electronic label Ed Banger Records. "Pop the Glock" was written by Uffie and produced by Feadz, and is in large-part based both lyrically and musically on Audio Two's "Top Billin".

Pop the Glock was the song that made Charli XCX realize she loved music and music production.

== Re-release ==
"Pop the Glock" was re-released as an EP on November 30, 2009 as a promotional tool for her debut album Sex Dreams and Denim Jeans (2010), where it was ultimately included. The release also included three remixes of "Pop the Glock" by producers Mirwais (who collaborated with Uffie on her upcoming album), Felix da Housecat and Ellen Allien. A music video for "Pop the Glock" was also released in late 2009.

The picture disc vinyl was officially released on January 5, 2010.

== Track listing ==
- Digital release
1. "Pop the Glock" – 3:29
2. "Pop the Glock" (Mirwais Pop Remix) – 2:31
3. "Pop the Glock" (Felix da Housecat/Pink Enemy Remix) – 5:38
4. "Pop the Glock" (Ellen Allien "Bang the Glock Mix 2009") – 7:36
5. "Pop the Glock" (video) – 3:29
- 12" single

A1. "Pop the Glock" – 3:29
A2. "Pop the Glock" (Mirwais Pop Remix) – 2:31
B1. "Pop the Glock" (Felix da Housecat/Pink Enemy Remix) – 5:38
B2. "Pop the Glock" (Ellen Allien "Bang the Glock Mix 2009") – 7:36

== Charts ==
Chart (2010)	Peak position
France (SNEP)	89
