= Pedro Winter =

French record producer and DJ (born 1975)

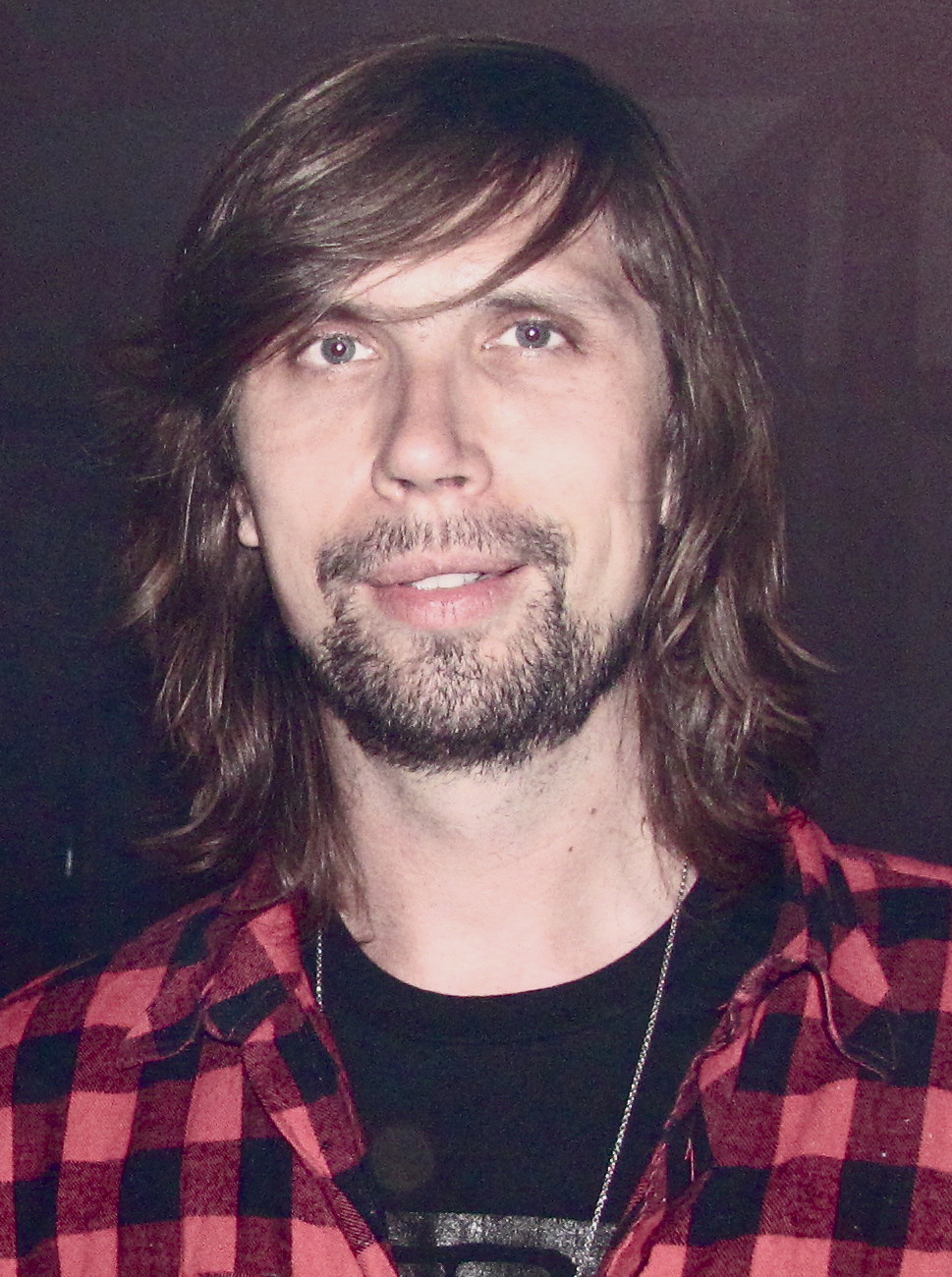
- Winter in 2011

Background information
- Also known as: Busy P
- Born: Pierre Winter; 21 April 1975 (age 51); Paris, France
- Genres: Electro house; hip house
- Occupations: Producer; DJ; manager
- Labels: Ed Banger; Because

Pedro Winter (born Pierre Winter; 21 April 1975), also known by the stage name Busy P, is a French record producer, DJ, record label owner, and former artist manager. He was the manager of Daft Punk from 1996 to 2008, and in 2003 founded the electronic music label Ed Banger Records, in which he signed artists like Justice, Breakbot, SebastiAn, Cassius, Mr. Oizo, DJ Mehdi and Myd among others.

== Life and career ==
Winter was born on 21 April 1975 in Paris, France. He grew up under the influence of heavy metal, hip-hop, and rock that would later show in his music, he says his favourite band of all time is Beastie Boys. He discovered electronic music in 1992 with his brother, Thomas Winter. Shortly after, he started DJing at the What's Up Bar and organizing the events Hype at Folies Pigalle and then Smoker The Palace with David Guetta.

In 1996, when he was a law student, Pedro met Thomas Bangalter and Guy-Manuel de Homem-Christo. The soon-to-be-famous duo Daft Punk asked him to be their manager and he obliged.

In 2002, he created Headbangers Entertainment, through which he managed various artists including Cassius, Cosmo Vitelli, Thomas Winter et Bogue, and DJ Mehdi. A year later, Winter founded the label Ed Banger Records, a music division that first signed Mr. Flash with the release "Radar Rider", then signing Justice, followed by SebastiAn in 2004, and later Uffie, DJ Mehdi, Mr. Oizo and more. In 2008, he stopped managing Daft Punk to focus on his label and music career as Busy P.

For Phoenix's debut album, United, Winter performed on a Rapman synthesizer in the song "Funky Squaredance". His remix single of Fancy's "What's Your Name Again" was a club hit on its release. The music video for this was again created under the Ed Banger Records label.

=== Personal life ===
Pedro was married to Nadege Winter, head of public relations at Parisian boutique Colette. His brother, Thomas Winter, an indie and electro house vocalist, is a former tattooshop owner.

== Discography (as Busy P) ==
=== EPs ===
Year	Title	Format	Label
2004	"Limit Ed"	12-inch	Ed Banger Records
2007	"Rainbow Man"	12-inch	Ed Banger Records
2007	"The Headbangers" (featuring Gérard Baste)	7-inch	Arcade Mode
2008	"Pedrophilia"	12-inch	Ed Banger Records
2013	"Still Busy" (featuring Thunderbird Gerard)	12-inch	Ed Banger Records
2017	"Genie" (featuring Mayer Hawthorne)	12-inch	Ed Banger Records
2021	"Track of Time" (featuring Haich Ber Na and Shay Lia)	12-inch	Ed Banger Records

=== Compilations & Soundtracks ===
Year	Title	Format	Label
2006	"Chop Suey" on Ed Rec Vol. 1	CD and digital	Ed Banger Records
2007	"49ers" on Ed Rec Vol. 2	CD and digital	Ed Banger Records
2008	"To Protect And Entertain" on Ed Rec Vol. III	CD and digital	Ed Banger Records
2014	"C.O.N.T.R.O.L" and "Fermeture" on Vandroid	12-inch and digital	Ed Banger Records
2015	"Gypsy Life"	10-inch	Ed Banger Records
