= Uffie =

American-French singer, songwriter, rapper, DJ and fashion designer

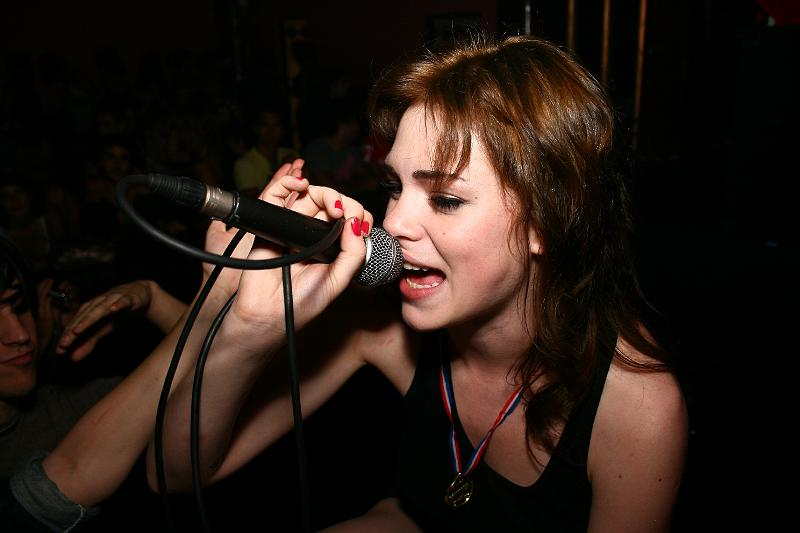
- Uffie performing in Barcelona, Spain in 2007

Background information
- Born: Anna-Catherine Hartley; December 9, 1988 (age 37); Miami, Florida, U.S.
- Origin: Paris
- Genres: Synth-pop; alternative dance; nu-disco; electroclash
- Occupations: Singer; songwriter; rapper; DJ; fashion designer
- Instruments: Vocals; keyboards
- Years active: 2005–2013; 2016–present
- Labels: Arcade Mode; Ed Banger; Because; Elektra

Anna-Catherine Hartley (born December 9, 1988), known professionally as Uffie (/ˈʌfiː/), is an American and French singer, songwriter, rapper, DJ, and fashion designer formerly signed to French electronic music record label Ed Banger Records.

Uffie's music incorporates synthpop, acid house, alternative dance, and "somewhere between electro, rap and nu skool". She is perhaps best known for her single "Pop the Glock", as well as "TThhEe PPaARRtTYY", her collaboration with Justice which appears on their Grammy nominated album Cross. Some of her live performances have been described as "Warholian".

In 2010, Uffie released her debut album Sex Dreams and Denim Jeans, which was included on several year-end critics' lists and was nominated in the French Victoires de la Musique for Best Electronic Album.

Following a hiatus, Uffie independently released her EP Tokyo Love Hotel in 2019.

== Biography ==
Uffie was born Anna-Catherine Hartley in Miami, Florida, to a Japanese mother and an English father. She moved to Hong Kong with her family at the age of four, where she spent her formative years. According to Hartley, Uffie is a nickname her father gave her, and comes from the French word "œuf", which means "egg". She recalls: "[W]hen I was little it started as 'Enough'. My parents were always saying 'Enough!' Then my dad figured, 'Hey, enough is un œuf, is a petite œuf' [...] So by the time my memory begins they were all calling me Uffie." During her teens, Uffie moved with her mother to Fort Lauderdale and then back to Miami, where she was arrested for vandalism at the age of 15, causing her mother to send her to live with her father in Paris.

Uffie studied fashion in Paris and attended the International School of Paris. In 2005, Uffie booked Feadz for a party she was organizing, and the two began a relationship shortly after. Feadz constantly pressured Uffie to provide vocals for some of his tracks and finally in late 2005 Uffie wrote "Pop the Glock" while on holiday and released it as a Myspace demo. Record label Arcade Mode gave the song a limited promo release in January 2006 with the B-side "Ready to Uff" which Feadz's labelmate Mr. Oizo produced. Soon after the release Uffie was signed to the French electronic music label Ed Banger Records by Busy P. Uffie then began dating graffiti artist and photographer André Saraiva, and the two were married in August 2008. The couple divorced in the summer of 2009, before the birth of their daughter Henrietta in October 2009. She took a brief hiatus from work, which gave her time to find herself and mature as an artist and finish her full-length debut album, Sex Dreams and Denim Jeans.

== Career ==
=== 2005–2008: Early years ===
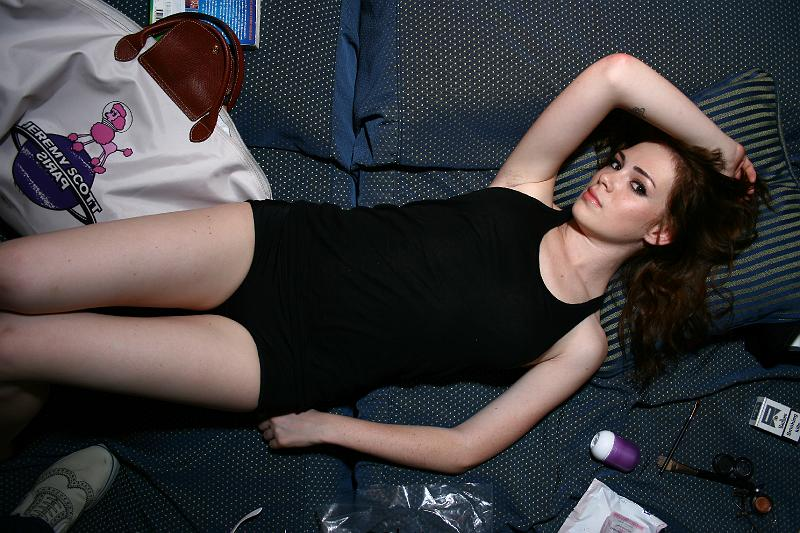
Uffie, 2007

In early 2005, Feadz, who was Uffie's boyfriend at the time, convinced her to provide vocals on his track "Uffie & Me" for his EP Forward 4, which was when she began to develop an interest in making music. Later that year, she wrote and recorded "Pop the Glock", which was produced by Feadz and began to shop the demo around to various record labels. "Pop the Glock" became her first single and was given a limited promo release on Arcade Mode in January 2006. Busy P, the owner of Ed Banger Records, heard the single and quickly signed both Uffie and Feadz to the label. "Pop the Glock" and its B-side "Ready to Uff" were both given an official release titled Pop the Glock/Ready to Uff on February 27, 2006 through Ed Banger Records. Both songs contained elements of electro and rap. The release also featured a remix by SebastiAn.

In February 2007, the song "Dismissed" was included on Ed Rec Vol. 2, an Ed Banger Records label compilation. Two more new tracks from Uffie, "Hot Chick" and "In Charge", leaked to blogs before being released as a double A-side in November 2006. The EP Suited and Looted was released in June 2007 by Ed Banger Records, containing the single "F1rst Love" and "Brand New Car". Canadian electronic duo Crystal Castles featured vocals sampled from Uffie on the track "Make It Hott", although it was never officially released, it can be found through various audioblogs. Also in 2007, Uffie collaborated with labelmates Justice on the song "TThhEe PPaARRtTYY", from their debut album †.

Uffie contributed the song "Robot Oeuf" to the compilation Ed Rec Vol. 3, released on May 26, 2008. It was also included in the soundtrack to Pedro Almodóvar's 2009 film Broken Embraces, starring Penélope Cruz. In late 2008, she worked with Mr. Oizo on the track "Steroids", included on Mr. Oizo's album Lambs Anger. A remix of "Steroids" also appears on Mr. Oizo's 2009 EP Pourriture.

Uffie has been described as a muse for French DJs, and her style was described as being "often performed in a wannabe English accent" with "a deliberately staid anti-flow delivery that walks a fine line between electro and nu-skool rap."

=== 2009–2010: Sex Dreams and Denim Jeans ===
Uffie's record label Ed Banger Records first stated in late 2006 that her debut album would be released mid-to-late 2007, then sometime in 2008. Her debut album, titled Sex Dreams and Denim Jeans, was eventually released June 15, 2010 in Europe and June 22, 2010 in the United States.

The title track "Sex Dreams and Denim Jeans" heavily samples The Velvet Underground's 1970 song "Rock & Roll"; during an interview with The Quietus in July 2010, Uffie claimed that it was "fucking difficult" to deal with Lou Reed while getting the sample cleared. When asked if he had heard the song, she stated, "Yes he has, he had to clear it. And it was a very not nice experience dealing with him, I have to say [...] I don't know what this guy's problem is but on the credits I think it even says something like he wrote it. He gets everything."

The music video for "Pop the Glock" was directed by Nathalie Canguilhem, was shot in the house that was used in the Academy Award-winning 1997 film Boogie Nights. The video premiered on October 3, 2009. Following the music video release, "Pop the Glock" was re-released as a single on November 30, 2009 as promotion for her then-upcoming album, reaching number 89 in France. The new release includes three remixes by Mirwais, Felix da Housecat and Ellen Allien. On October 8, 2009, The Guardian featured Uffie as "New Band of the Day", and announced that Sex Dreams and Denim Jeans would be officially released in the spring of 2010 and that she had covered a version of Siouxsie and the Banshees' 1978 song "Hong Kong Garden", which was included on the album.

Uffie confirmed through her official Facebook page that Sex Dreams and Denim Jeans would be released on June 15, 2010 in Europe by Ed Banger Records. It was also confirmed in early April 2010 that Uffie had signed with major label Elektra Records to distribute her work internationally who released Sex Dreams and Denim Jeans on June 22, 2010.

Uffie and Mr. Oizo teamed up once again on "MCs Can Kiss", the first single from Sex Dreams and Denim Jeans. The single was released digitally on January 12, 2010 and was officially released as a 12" vinyl on February 1, 2010 through Ed Banger Records. "MCs Can Kiss" received positive reviews from critics, and it was described as "an old school soundclash of heavy beats and sharp rhymes" that "shows off the French-American's ballsy schtick to full effect." "MCs Can Kiss" peaked at number 97 on the French Singles Chart, as well as number 48 on the Japan Hot 100. On March 11, 2010, a remix of "MCs Can Kiss" by Beastie Boys member Mike D was made available as a free download from Uffie's official website.

During an interview on February 12, 2010 on Kissy Sell Out's BBC Radio 1 radio show, Uffie premiered a new track called "Illusion of Love", which features guest vocals from Mattie Safer, formerly of the band The Rapture. She explained that "Illusion of Love" is much more mature than her previous work and is by far the slowest track she has ever made.

On April 15, 2010, "ADD SUV" premiered on BBC Radio 1. The song features Pharrell Williams and was produced by Mirwais. A music video began to shoot for "ADD SUV" starring both Uffie and Williams on April 9, 2010 and was released shortly before her debut album release. The single received positive reviews from the New York Post, Prefix Magazine and Spin. Following anticipation around "ADD SUV", the song debuted at number one on The Hype Machine. It was also announced that "ADD SUV" would be released as an EP (including remixes by Armand Van Helden and Hudson Mohawke) on May 17, 2010, prior to Uffie's debut album release. "ADD SUV" reached number 31 on the UK Dance Singles Chart and number 28 on the UK Independent Singles Chart.

Sex Dreams and Denim Jeans peaked at number seven on both the French Digital Albums Chart and the Belgian Heatseekers Albums Chart. It then stayed on the French Albums Chart for a total of 12 weeks. In the US, it reached number 17 on the Dance/Electronic Albums and number 32 on the Heatseekers Albums. It also peaked at number 18 on the UK Dance Albums Chart and number 31 on the UK Independent Albums Chart. Singles "F1rst Love", "Pop the Glock", "MCs Can Kiss", and "ADD SUV" also managed to chart in various countries such as Belgium, France, Japan, and the UK.

Also in 2010, Uffie, who was originally studying to be a fashion designer in Paris, announced her partnership with clothing brand Diesel to design a 12-piece collection that ranges from a structured leather-and-denim corset jumpsuit to an oversize ombre bag. The collection was made available at Diesel stores and selected contemporary stores worldwide in November 2010.

In August 2010, Ed Banger Records confirmed through their Facebook page that Uffie's next single to be released would be "Difficult", produced by Uffie's fellow labelmate and friend SebastiAn. It was later announced that "Difficult" would be released as an EP on October 18, 2010 through Ed Banger Records, Because Music and Elektra Records, containing remixes from SebastiAn and Azari & III. A music video for the single was released on October 6, 2010 and was directed by French filmmakers AB/CD/CD. The remix provided by SebastiAn, titled "2006 Parties Remix", was released to critical praise and reached number one on The Hype Machine the day of being released.

Sex Dreams and Denim Jeans was placed at number 35 on Drowned in Sound's list of the 50 best albums of 2010 and was also included as one of the top albums of 2010 by several other publications. The album was also nominated in the French Victoires de la Musique for Best Electronic Album and was awarded a silver certification from the Independent Music Companies Association, indicating sales of at least 20,000 copies throughout Europe.

=== 2011–2015: Hiatus ===
The Fred Falke remix of "Illusion of Love" was released digitally in France on March 14, 2011, in promotion of the action fantasy film Sucker Punch, although it was not included on the film's soundtrack.

Uffie's cover of Tom Tom Club's 1981 song "Wordy Rappinghood", produced by labelmate DJ Mehdi, was released digitally on April 18, 2011.

In February 2012, Uffie announced she was working on her second album, and hoped to have the lead single being released early 2013. In February 2012, in an interview Uffie stated that she had many projects in the works including her album, a film, and the possibility of the release of an EP later in 2012. In June 2013, she announced that she had been living in Los Angeles and had just welcomed the birth of her second child. In October that same year, Uffie announced via her (now defunct) Twitter account that she was retiring from "Uffie". Later that week, UffieFrance, an Uffie fansite posted an email correspondence with Anna Hartley where she explains "I am moving in to different projects under different alias... I will continue music just with a new project".

=== 2016–2021: Return to music ===
In February 2016 Uffie started working on a new EP in Los Angeles studio New Wave Records with Mat Bastard of Skip the Use band and Nathaniel Hoho, amongst others.

On March 30, 2016, Uffie updated her long abandoned Facebook page. She stated in a series of responses to fans that she was planning new releases, in addition to a tour. Some new tracks, titled 'Tied Up' and 'Sassy' were previewed to fans.

Uffie appears as a featured artist on English singer Charli XCX's mixtape Number 1 Angel, released digitally on March 10, 2017, then on cassette and vinyl on April 20, 2018.

In 2017 Uffie performed live in Phoenix as a headliner for the VIVA PHX! festival where she performed a mix of old and new songs with a new band. Later in the year she performed at the 10th Anniversary Hard Festival in LA.

In May 2018, Uffie released "Drugs", her first single in seven years and also appeared as a featured artist on Galantis' single "Spaceship", which reached number 36 on the Billboard Dance/Electronic Chart.

Her single, "Papercuts", was included in Paper Magazine's best songs of 2018.

A documentary focused on Uffie's life and career, chronicling the period of time during her hiatus, premiered at the 2019 FIPA film festival in France.

Tokyo Love Hotel, her first full-length project since her 2010 debut album, was released on February 22, 2019.

Uffie co-wrote the title track to Pink's Hurts 2B Human album.

Uffie teamed up with Jam Sutton to create an "augmented reality experience" for her single "Ego", co-written with Ariel Pink. The project began as a "sculptural piece exploring the ego" inspired by the work of Carl Jung's shadow theory and contains a marble sculpture by Sutton, depicting Uffie with a mythological serpent. The statue can be viewed in an immersive experience in the Jam Sutton Studio App and was used as the cover art for the single as well as a music video.

=== 2022–present: Sunshine Factory ===
Uffie released her second album Sunshine Factory in 2022 through Carpark and Company Records, which was co-produced by Chaz Bear of Toro y Moi. It was described by the artist as a nightclub-themed fantasy of post-pandemic escape.

Later that year, she co-wrote and provided vocals on "Serotonin Moonbeams," the first new single by The Blessed Madonna since 2017.

In 2023, she released the double A-side Oopsie/Alchemy via Smartdumb.

In 2026, she co-wrote Slovakian artist Adéla single Nicole Kidman, which reached the top 10 in multiple countries.

== Discography ==
=== Albums ===
==== Studio albums ====
List of studio albums, with selected chart positions
Title	Details	Peak chart positions						
Title	Details	US Dance	UK Dance	FRA	BEL (WA)	GER	GRC	SWI
Sex Dreams and Denim Jeans	Released: June 14, 2010; Label: Ed Banger, Because; Formats: CD, LP, digital download	17	18	59	76	77	43	62
Sunshine Factory	Released: May 20, 2022; Label: Company, Carpark; Formats: CD, LP, digital download	—	—	—	—	—	—	—

==== Extended plays ====
List of extended plays
Title	Details
Pop the Glock / Ready to Uff	Released: February 2006; Label: Ed Banger; Format: LP
Tokyo Love Hotel	Released: February 22, 2019; Label: Self-released; Format: Digital download

=== Singles ===
==== As lead artist ====
List of singles, with selected chart positions, showing year released and album name
Title	Year	Peak chart positions						Album
Title	Year	BEL (FL)	BEL (WA)	FRA	JPN	UK Dance	UK Indie	Album
"Hot Chick"	2006	—	—	—	—	—	—	Non-album single
"F1rst Love"	2007	18	18	—	—	—	—	Sex Dreams and Denim Jeans
"Pop the Glock"	2009	—	—	89	—	—	—	Sex Dreams and Denim Jeans
"MCs Can Kiss"	2010	—	—	97	48	—	—	Sex Dreams and Denim Jeans
"ADD SUV" (featuring Pharrell Williams)	2010	—	—	—	—	31	28	Sex Dreams and Denim Jeans
"Difficult"	2010	—	—	—	—	—	—	Sex Dreams and Denim Jeans
"Wordy Rappinghood"	2011	—	—	—	—	—	—	Non-album single
"Drugs"	2018	—	—	—	—	—	—	Tokyo Love Hotel
"Your Hood"	2018	—	—	—	—	—	—	Non-album singles
"Sideways"	2018	—	—	—	—	—	—	Non-album singles
"Papercuts"	2018	—	—	—	—	—	—	Tokyo Love Hotel
"Sadmoney"	2019	—	—	—	—	—	—	Tokyo Love Hotel
"No Take Me Backs"	2019	—	—	—	—	—	—	Non-album singles
"Mine"	2019	—	—	—	—	—	—	Non-album singles
"Weed & Drum Machine"	2019	—	—	—	—	—	—	Non-album singles
"Ego"	2019	—	—	—	—	—	—	Non-album singles
"FroYo for Your Tears"	2020	—	—	—	—	—	—	Non-album singles
"Cool"	2021	—	—	—	—	—	—	Sunshine Factory
"Dominoes"	2022	—	—	—	—	—	—	Sunshine Factory
"Where Does The Party Go?"	2022	—	—	—	—	—	—	Sunshine Factory
"Sophia"	2022	—	—	—	—	—	—	Sunshine Factory
"Oopsie"	2023	—	—	—	—	—	—	Non-album singles
"Alchemy"	2023	—	—	—	—	—	—	Non-album singles
"Poolside Goth"	2025	—	—	—	—	—	—	Non-album singles
"—" denotes a recording that did not chart or was not released in that territory.

==== As featured artist ====
List of singles as a featured artist, showing year released and album name
Title	Year	Album
"Fais Rentrer Les Euros" (M.I.T.C.H. featuring Uffie, Feadz, DJ Raze, Soper and Shone)	2008	Non-album single
"TThhEe PPaARRtTYY" (Justice featuring Uffie)	2009	†
"Spaceship" (Galantis featuring Uffie)	2018	Non-album single

=== Guest appearances ===
List of non-single appearances, with other performing artists, showing year released and album name
Title	Year	Other artist(s)	Album
"Uffie & Me"	2005	Feadz	Forward 4 EP
"Dismissed"	2007	None	Ed Rec Vol. 2
"Low Life (LA Riots Mix)"	2007	Steve Aoki, Scanners, LA Riots	Pillowface and His Airplane Chronicles
"Robot Oeuf"	2008	None	Ed Rec Vol. 3
"Make It Hott"	2008	Crystal Castles	Non-album song
"Steroids"	2008	Mr. Oizo	Lambs Anger
"That's What She Said"	2012	Jin Akanishi	Japonicana
"Babygirl"	2017	Charli XCX	Number 1 Angel
"Serotonin Moonbeams"	2022	The Blessed Madonna	Serotonin Moonbeams
"Looking Down from Space"	2023	OTR	Be Quiet, They're Listening

=== Music videos ===
List of music videos, showing year released and director
Title	Year	Director(s)
"Pop the Glock"	2009	Nathalie Canguilhem
"ADD SUV" (featuring Pharrell Williams)	2010	Nathalie Canguilhem
"Difficult"	2010	AB/CD/CD
"Cool"	2021	Mynxii White
"Where Does The Party Go?"	2022	Jocelyn Woods
"Sophia"	2022	Gareth Peck & Miko

=== Remixes ===
List of remixes, showing year released and original artist
Title	Year	Other artist(s)
"Drinks"	2020	Cyn
"20MGs" (together with Lokoy)	2023	Milk & Bone
"Girl Party" (together with Lokoy)	2024	MGNA Crrrta
