= Quentin Dupieux =

French musician and filmmaker

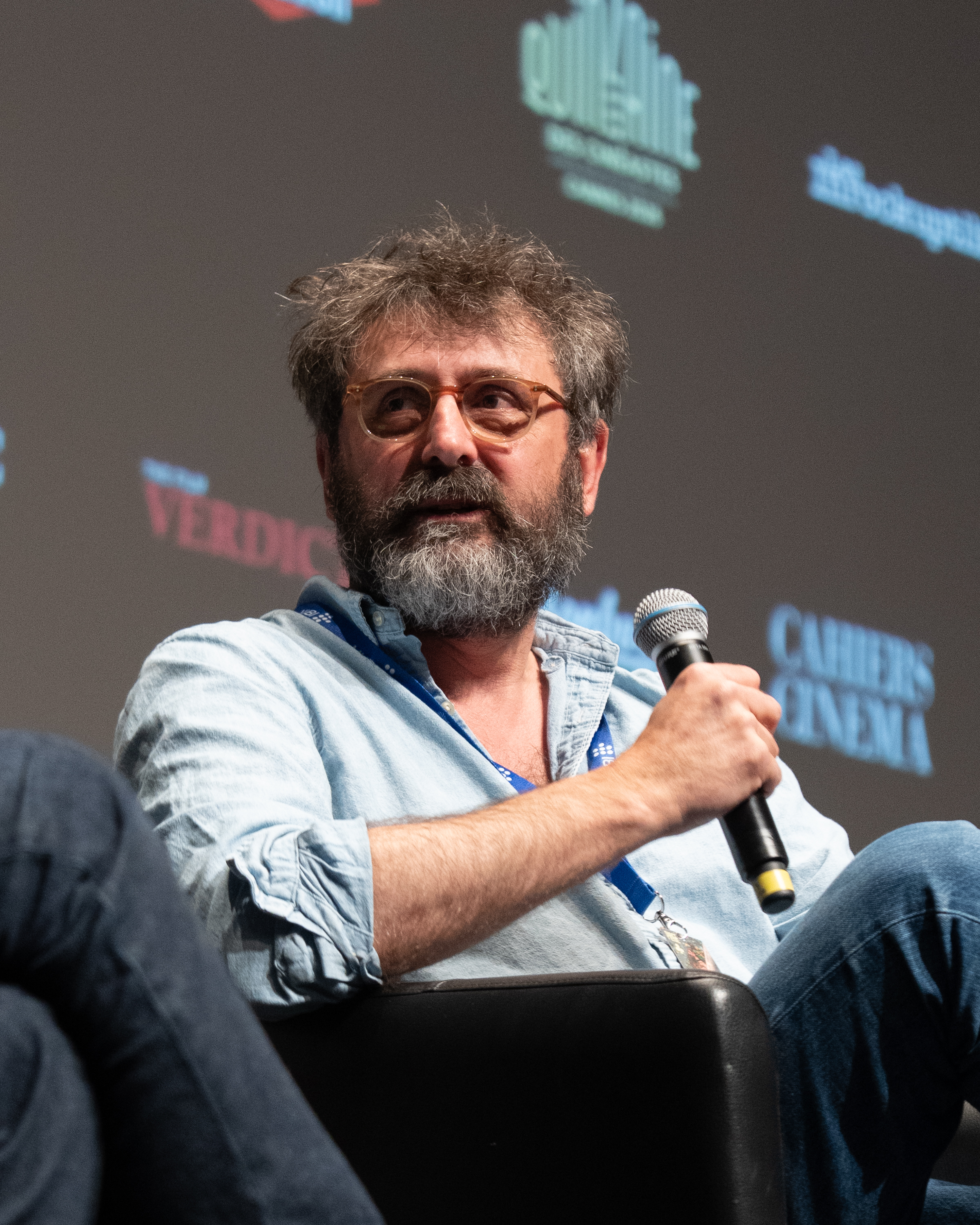
- Dupieux at the 2026 Cannes Film Festival
- Born: Quentin Dupieux; 14 April 1974 (age 52); Paris, France
- Other name: Mr. Oizo
- Occupations: Filmmaker; record producer; DJ; composer; songwriter
- Years active: 1997–present
- Musical career
- Genres: French house; techno; experimental
- Instruments: Synthesizer; sampler; drum machine; keyboard; computer
- Labels: F Communications; Ed Banger Records; Because Music; Brainfeeder

Quentin Dupieux (French: [kɑ̃tɛ̃ dypjø]; born 14 April 1974), also known by his musical stage name Mr. Oizo (French: [wazo]), is a French electronic musician, record producer, songwriter, and filmmaker.

Dupieux is credited with his legal name for his films, while the stage name "Mr. Oizo" is used for his musical works.

Dupieux has directed numerous films including Rubber (2010), Wrong (2012), Wrong Cops (2013), and Reality (2014). After initially producing his films in the United States, he began making films in France in 2018. Since then, he has released Keep an Eye Out! (2018), Deerskin (2019), Mandibles (2020), Incredible but True (2022), Smoking Causes Coughing (2022), Yannick (2023) and Daaaaaalí! (2023) which have been primarily filmed and produced in France.

Under the pseudonym Mr. Oizo, he is best known for his 1999 single "Flat Beat". His pseudonym is a corruption of the French oiseau, meaning "bird". He is signed to F Communications, Ed Banger Records and Brainfeeder.

== Early life ==
Quentin Dupieux was born on the 14th of April, 1974 in Paris. At the age of 18, he found a camera and started taking photographs. At the age of 19, while making one of his first short films, he added a soundtrack to the movie by using music from a record. However, when a TV channel wanted to buy the film, he realized they needed to have the rights to the music. This led to Dupieux buying a synthesizer so that he could redo the music for his film. A few years later, he discovered the house music scene and started making music. In 1997, Laurent Garnier of the record label FCom bought a car from Dupieux's father. Garnier then found out about his talents and let him direct the music video for his song "Flashback". Dupieux was subsequently signed to FCom, which saw the release of his first EP, #1.

== Musical career ==
=== "Flat Beat" ===
Dupieux released "Flat Beat" in January 1999, a track consisting mainly of a repeated bass loop and a drum sample from "Put Your Love in My Tender Care" by The Fatback Band. In an interview with XLR8R magazine, Dupieux stated that it took him only two hours with a Korg MS-20 to produce. "Flat Beat" became a hit throughout Europe in 1999, becoming the best-known Mr. Oizo release. The track was featured in a series of Levi's jeans TV commercials, which featured a yellow puppet named Flat Eric nodding his head to the rhythm while riding in an old, beat-up Chevelle. Flat Eric was also featured in the song's music video. The Flat Beat EP has sold over three million copies. The song reached number 1 in the UK.

=== Analog Worms Attack ===
After "Flat Beat", Oizo spent two months creating his first full album, Analog Worms Attack, which was released in 1999. The album's name was derived from the fact that it was produced entirely using analog equipment. The record scratching effects were provided by Mr. Oizo's friend Feadz. "Flat Beat" appeared as a bonus track after the five minutes of silence following the final track "Analog Wormz Sequel". A total of three singles were released in support of the album. A version of "Monday Massacre" from the Flat Beat EP featuring sampled record scratching appears on the album, titled "No Day Massacre".

=== Moustache (Half a Scissor) ===
Moustache (Half a Scissor) was Mr. Oizo's second studio album. Released in 2005, the album was composed exclusively using computers as he had by that time decided to eschew the use of analog equipment. The extensive time it took to remodel his studio and master the use of computers in composing electronic music is cited as the reason for the long hiatus between Analog Worms Attack and Moustache (Half a Scissor). Before its public release, a promo CD was released onto the internet featuring three tracks not on the original release: "CPU", "Nazis", and "A Nun".

Some songs on the promo differ from the released album versions. For example, "Nurse Bob" is much longer on the final release whilst the promo version splices vocal samples into a much shorter version. This is the only Mr. Oizo album not to have its debut release on vinyl; a vinyl version would first be released in January 2011 through Brainfeeder.

=== Ed Banger Records ===
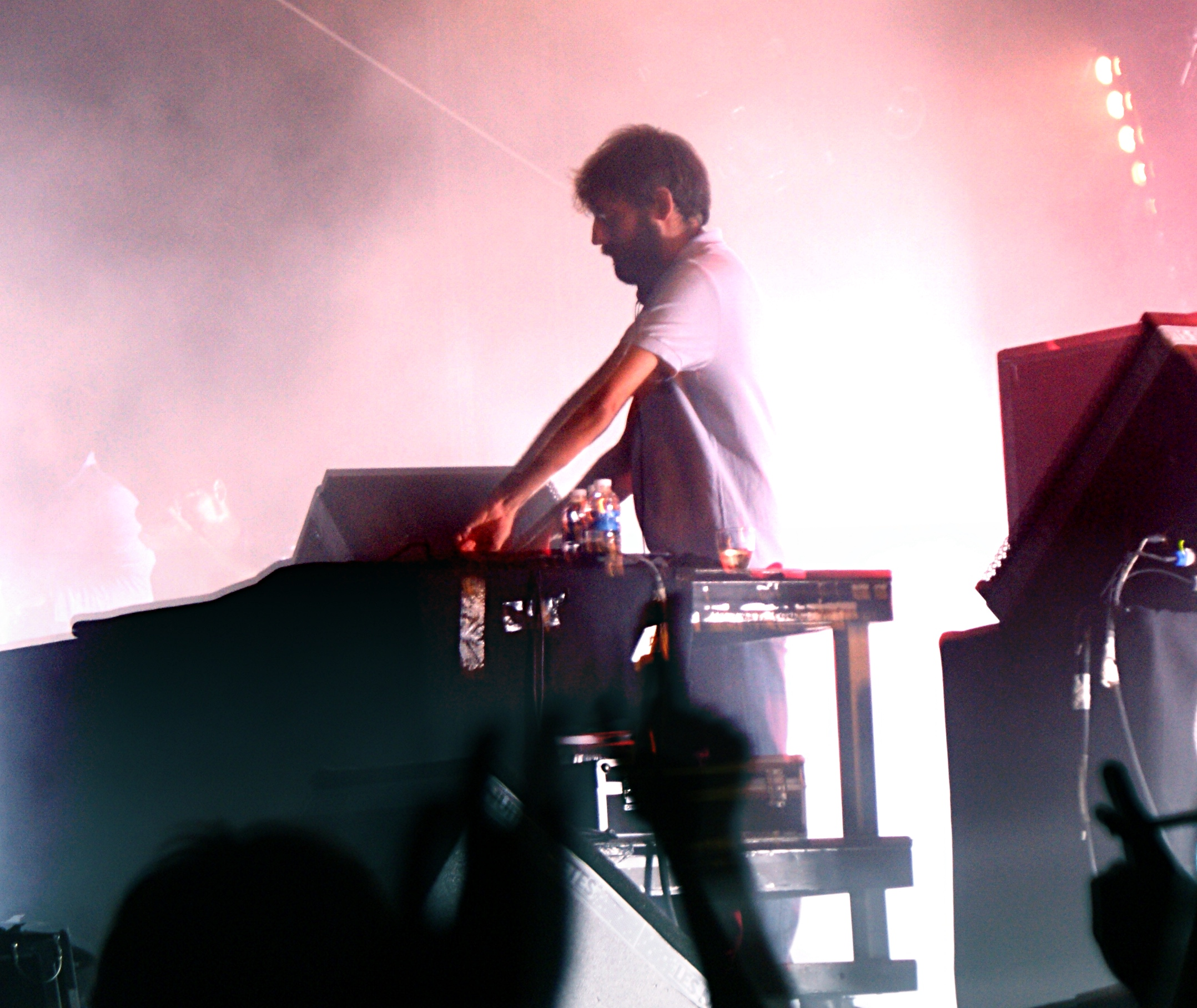
Mr. Oizo at Les Nuits Secrètes in 2009

Mr. Oizo's first EP released on Ed Banger Records is called "Transexual / Patrick122". The EP features the track "Patrick122", which is a re-working of the 1979 disco track "Do It at the Disco" by Gary's Gang. The track appeared on Mr. Oizo's MySpace page in 2006 under the title Patrick122.

On 16 October 2008 his MySpace page had another video appear: a promo for his upcoming album, Lambs Anger. The first single off the Record was "Positif", which was released 3 days after Lambs Anger. On 15 March 2009 the second single off the album was released, "Pourriture", released as an EP featuring some reworked titles by Oizo himself and a remix of "Erreurjean" by Arveene and Misk.

=== Lambs Anger ===
Lambs Anger is Mr. Oizo's first studio album released by Ed Banger Records, the label he chose after his split with F Communications, who notoriously referred to Moustache (Half a Scissor) as "unlistenable". "Positif", "Two Takes It" (featuring Carmen Castro) and "Pourriture" were chosen as the album's singles. The track "Steroïds" also features label-mate Uffie. "Two Takes It" is a cover of the song "It Takes Two" by Rob Base and DJ E-Z Rock and "Gay Dentists" contains samples of "Let's Start the Dance" by Hamilton Bohannon.

=== Collaborations with Uffie ===
Mr. Oizo and Uffie first collaborated on her second single, "Ready to Uff", in 2006. Since then he has produced the following tracks for Uffie: "Dismissed", "Hot Chick", "First Love" (which charted at number 18 in Belgium), "Steroids" and "MCs Can Kiss".

Mr. Oizo provided both production work and songwriting for Uffie's 2010 debut album, Sex Dreams and Denim Jeans. He worked alongside Feadz, SebastiAn, Mirwais, J-Mat and Uffie to produce and write the album. He produced the first single from the album, "MCs Can Kiss", which peaked at number 48 in Japan and 97 in France. He also produced the tracks "Art of Uff", "First Love", "Our Song" and "Neuneu".

=== The Church and All Wet ===
In 2014, Mr. Oizo released the album The Church, which contains 10 tracks, including a collaboration with Bart B More on the track "Dry Run". Unlike his previous album, The Church was released by Brainfeeder due to his activity in the United States at the time.

Two years later, he released the album All Wet on Ed Banger Records. The album contains collaborations with Boys Noize, Phra, Siriusmo, Mocky, Peaches, Charli XCX and Skrillex on the track "End of the World", the latter serving as the lead single for the album.

== Production and equipment ==
In his early years, Mr. Oizo used a Korg MS-20, a Roland TR-606, an Akai S1000, and a demo of Cakewalk. Mr. Oizo is known currently for strong use of computers in his music. As he stated in an interview with XLR8R, he started using computers to avoid having to plug in four different appliances, and because the resulting music is more or less the same. His first album to switch to all computers was Moustache (Half a Scissor). For Lambs Anger, Mr. Oizo used a Macintosh G5 running Logic Pro to compose all of the songs. During his DJ sets, he uses two CDJs.

== Filmmaking career ==
=== Beginnings ===
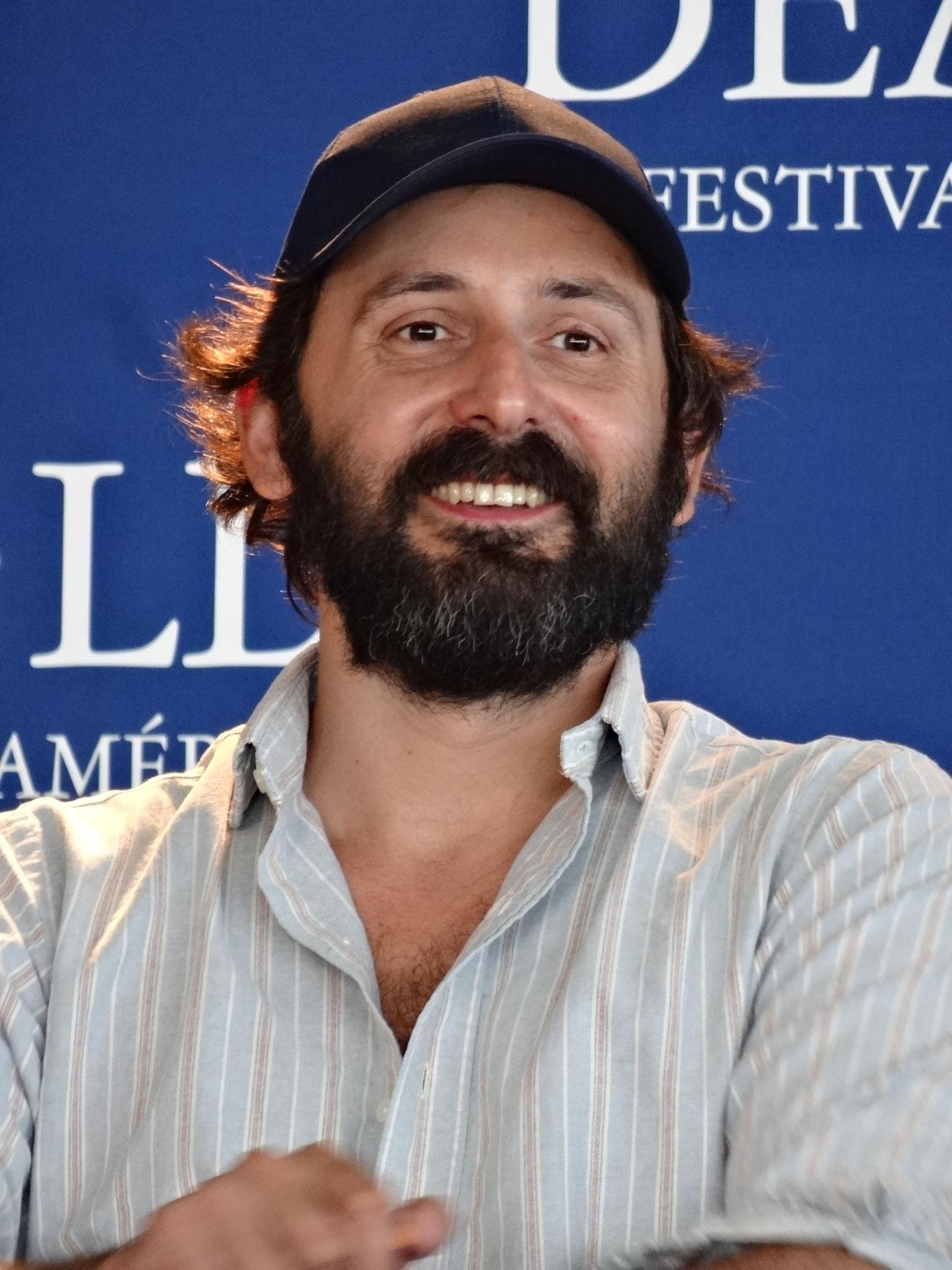
Dupieux at the 2012 Deauville American Film Festival

At the age of 15, Dupieux became passionate about making movies. Around the age of 18, he began writing and shooting his own short films. His earliest work includes several music videos for his electronic music project Mr. Oizo, starting with the 1997 music video "Kirk". Many of his early films would also use music that he had composed.

His first film, Nonfilm, starring Vincent Belorgey (Kavinsky) and Sébastien Tellier, released in 2001.

Dupieux's second feature film Steak was released in France on 20 June 2007. The cast is composed of Éric Judor, Ramzy Bedia, Jonathan Lambert, Vincent Belorgey and Sebastian Akchoté (SebastiAn), with an original soundtrack composed by Dupieux himself in collaboration with Sébastien Tellier and SebastiAn. The film ended up being a box-office bomb and the only film by Dupieux that did not receive an international release. According to Dupieux, the film was marketed as a "popular comedy" by StudioCanal, leading to the audience expecting to see a comedy more similar to previous films by Éric and Ramzy, hence the reason for this flop in the theaters. Dupieux also directed the opening credit sequence for the adult animated series Moot-Moot, created by Éric and Ramzy, broadcast on Canal+ the same year.

=== Breakthrough and international success ===
Dupieux's breakthrough came in 2010 with the release of the horror-comedy film Rubber. The film, which revolves around a rubber tire with telekinetic powers that goes on a killing spree, received praise at film festivals for combining B-movie aesthetics with absurdist, experimental filmmaking. The electronic music duo Justice stated that they would be working on the soundtrack for Rubber, saying they had to 'finish working on the soundtrack for Mr. Oizo's new film before we start recording for the new album'. However, only Gaspard Augé of the duo ended up collaborating with Dupieux on the soundtrack. In the United States, the film was released simultaneously through streaming and limited theatrical engagements.

Dupieux's next movie, the surreal comedy Wrong, premiered at the Sundance Film Festival in 2012.

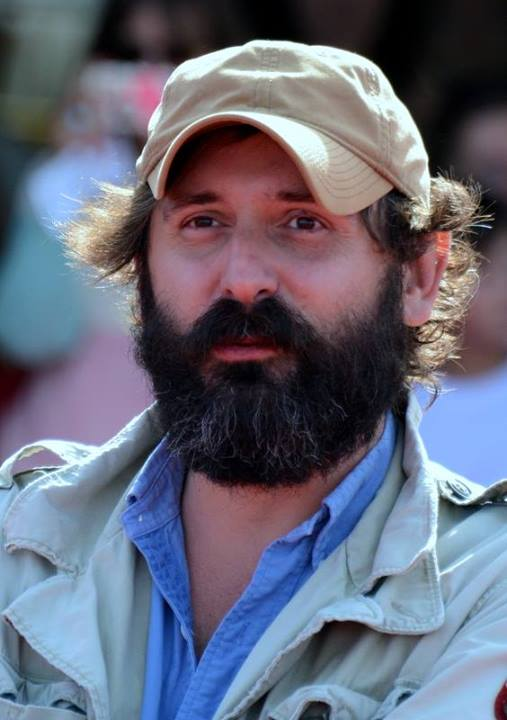
Dupieux at Festival Deauville in 2013

In 2013, Dupieux released the comedy Wrong Cops, featuring an ensemble cast including Eric Wareheim, Steve Little, Ray Wise, and Marilyn Manson. The film was produced by Realitism Films, who describe it as "a filthy 90 minute comedy about some disturbed cops. It is not a sequel to Wrong." The first thirteen-minute chapter of the film premiered at the 2012 Cannes Film Festival. Although the movie is not a sequel to Wrong, Dupieux came up with the idea because he loved Mark Burnham's performance as an unpleasant cop in the movie and decided to base a movie off his character.

Dupieux returned in 2014 with the surreal comedy Reality, starring Alain Chabat, distributed in the US by IFC Midnight. The film premiered in the Horizons section at the 71st Venice International Film Festival on 28 August 2014. Reality would end the trend of Dupieux composing his own music for his films; instead, the film's soundtrack consists solely of the first five minutes of "Music With Changing Parts" by Philip Glass.

=== Return to France ===
After the release of Reality, Dupieux returned to France, where he would resume making French-language films. He noted that his American period was "like a stylistic exercise, about satisfying a fantasy." and that "I needed to come back to the country and the language I understand.".

In 2018, he released his first film shot in France, Keep an Eye Out! (original title: Au poste!), starring Benoît Poelvoorde and Grégoire Ludig, released in theaters. The film's story involves a commissaire de police (Poelvoorde) and a suspect (Ludig) in an interrogation room. For this film, Dupieux was indirectly inspired by the film Le Magnifique, starring Jean-Paul Belmondo, and some press reviews have compared the film to Buffet froid by Bertrand Blier.

In 2019, Dupieux returned with Deerskin (original title: Le daim), starring Jean Dujardin and Adèle Haenel. The film was presented as opening film at the Directors' Fortnight at the 2019 Cannes Film Festival.

His film Mandibles (original title: Mandibules), starring David Marsais and Grégoire Ludig, the two members of the duo Palmashow, released on 19 May 2021 in French theaters. It was screened out of competition at the 77th Venice International Film Festival on 5 September 2020. Following the critical success of the film at the Venice International Film Festival, Magnolia Pictures acquired distribution rights for the United States.

In 2022, he released two films. The first, Incredible but True (original title: Incroyable mais vrai), was released in June 2022 in French theaters and starred Alain Chabat and Anaïs Demoustier, who respectively played in his previous films Reality and Au poste!. The second, Smoking Causes Coughing (original title: Fumer fait tousser), was released in November 2022 in French theaters and also featured Chabat and Demoustier as actors.

In March 2023, Dupieux commented, "I am now at the stage where I can write whatever I want in the knowledge that I will find some nice people to join me on the journey. I have actually been able to make at least three movies with good budgets. Now I have that status I am not going to let it go. I am forcing the industry to take note: I keep saying I have another one and now here's another one. At some point it will end, so I know it is now or never." In February 2024, he said: "I could do three a year, it would be fun! What is happening to me today, I have been waiting for a long time."

In 2023, he again released two films. The first, Yannick, was released in August 2023 in French theaters and starred Raphaël Quenard in the title role. The second, Daaaaaalí!, described as "a real fake biopic" on Salvador Dalí, premiered out of competition at the 80th Venice International Film Festival, and was released in French theaters in 2024.

In an August 2023 interview with Le Monde, Dupieux revealed that he had completed a screenplay for a film entitled Braces.

In January 2024, Léa Seydoux revealed in an interview with Télérama that she had already completed filming for an unannounced new film by Dupieux, The Second Act, which also stars Vincent Lindon, Louis Garrel and Raphaël Quenard. The film premiered at the Cannes Film Festival on 14 May 2024 and was released theatrically on the same day. In 2026, he announced a new animated film, Le Vertige, in which a low poly character realizes he's in a simulation.

=== Filmmaking style ===
Dupieux's films are highly surrealist in nature, and he has been compared to filmmakers such as Charlie Kaufman and Luis Buñuel, who Dupieux has cited as an inspiration. In interviews, Dupieux has frequently referenced the roles that dreams play in his movies, stating:

"[Film writing] is like a dream. When you’re dreaming, you make some very strange connections between some random stuff and random people. Sometimes you dream about someone you met 15 years ago, and you don’t know why that person comes into your dream so many years later. I’m just trying to find some secret places in the human brain because I think movies tend to be too rational sometimes. Everything is supposed to make sense. Everything is supposed to be logical, and I really think that life isn’t logical and life isn’t always meaningful. I’m just trying to go into that zone without being too random, and just trying to create some new logic that feels like dreams."

The frequent use of dreams in his movies have also invited comparisons to director David Lynch, although Dupieux himself dislikes this comparison, saying it is a bad way to present his work.

His movies often consist of meta narratives: In the film Rubber, a group of "audience members" on-screen watch the events of the film take place, the film Reality is a film about a filmmaker attempting to create a suitable groan of pain for his new movie, in the climax of Keep an Eye Out, it is revealed the actors are part of a theater troupe that have been performing the events of the film on stage for an audience.

In addition to directing, Dupieux also serves as the cinematographer and editor for all of his films. His wife, Joan Le Boru, serves as the chief decorator and artistic director of his films.

== Personal life ==
He currently lives with his partner, Joan Le Boru. They have several children together.

== Discography ==
Studio albums

- Analog Worms Attack (1999)
- Moustache (Half a Scissor) (2005)
- Lambs Anger (2008)
- Stade 2 (2011)
- The Church (2014)
- All Wet (2016)
- Voilà (with Phra) (2022)

== Filmography ==
=== Films ===
Year	English Title	Original Title	Also credited as			Notes
Year	English Title	Original Title	Cinematographer	Editor	Composer	Notes
2001	Nonfilm		Yes	Yes	—N/a	Two existing versions, respectively 44 and 75 minutes
2007	Steak		No	No	Yes	
2010	Rubber		Yes	Yes	Yes	
2012	Wrong		Yes	Yes	Yes	
2012	Wrong Cops: Chapter One		Yes	Yes	Yes	Short film
2013	Wrong Cops		Yes	Yes	Yes	
2014	Reality	Réalité	Yes	Yes	No	
2018	Keep an Eye Out!	Au poste!	Yes	Yes	No	
2019	Deerskin	Le Daim	Yes	Yes	No	
2020	Mandibles	Mandibules	Yes	Yes	No	
2022	Incredible but True	Incroyable mais vrai	Yes	Yes	No	
2022	Smoking Causes Coughing	Fumer fait tousser	Yes	Yes	No	
2023	Yannick		Yes	Yes	No	Also producer
2023	Daaaaaalí!		Yes	Yes	No	
2024	The Second Act	Le Deuxième Acte	Yes	Yes	Yes	
2025	The Piano Accident	L'Accident de piano	Yes	Yes	Yes	
2026	Full Phil		Yes	Yes	No	
2026	Vertiginous	Le Vertige	Yes	Yes	No	Animated film
TBA	Signaux		Yes	TBA	TBA	Post-production

=== Music videos ===
- "Kirk" (1997)
- "Flashback" - Laurent Garnier (1997)
- "M-Seq" (1999)
- "Flat Beat" (1999)
- "Analog Worms Attack" (1999)
- "Inside the Kidney Machine" (1999)
- "Stunt" (2004)
- "La Ritournelle" - Sébastien Tellier (2004)
- "Making Lambs Anger" (2009)
- "Where's the Money, George?" (2010)
- "Being Flat" (2015) (Short film)
- "Night Owl" - Metronomy (2016)
- "Discow" - Handbraekes (2018)
- "Viandes Légumes Véhicules" - (2019, directed by Meat Dept.)

== Awards and nominations ==
Dupieux was promoted to "Officier de l'ordre des Arts et des Lettres" on 12 March 2019 by the Ministry of Culture.

Year	Awards	Work	Category	Result
1999	MTV Europe Music Awards	Himself	Best Male	Nominated
1999	Viva Comet Awards	Himself	Beste Werbung (Best Advertise)	Won
2000	Billboard Music Video Awards	"Flat Beat"	Best New Artist Clip (Dance)	Nominated
2008	Beatport Music Awards	Himself	Best Indie Dance / Nu Disco Artist	Nominated
2016	UK Music Video Awards	"Hand in the Fire" (with Charli XCX)	Best Animation	Nominated
2016	Best Art Vinyl	All Wet	Best Art Vinyl	Nominated
2024	Berlin Music Video Awards	"Doppelklick" (with Siriusmo)	Most Trashy	Nominated
2024	Electronic Dance Music Awards	"Ratata" (with Skrillex and Missy Elliott)	Best Collaboration	Nominated
