= Krazy Baldhead =

French electronic music artist

- Born: Pierre-Antoine Grison
- Origin: Toulon, France
- Genres: Electronic music, dance music
- Years active: 2004-present
- Label: Ed Banger Records
- Website: Krazy Baldhead on Myspace

Pierre-Antoine Grison, better known as Krazy Baldhead, is a French electronic music artist signed to Ed Banger Records.

== Career ==
After working as a telecommunications engineer, Grison pursued a career in music and his first release as Krazy Baldhead was the 2004 12-inch single "Bill's Break", released on Ed Banger Records. His debut album The B Suite was released in 2009.

In 2004 he formed the group Donso, a group performing West African music featuring the donso n'goni, along with Thomas Guillaume and later Malian musicians Guimba Kouyaté and Gédéon Papa Diarra. The group released albums in 2010 and 2013.

In 2012 he released his second solo album The Noise in the Sky.

Krazy Baldhead also works as a certified Ableton Live trainer.

== Discography ==
=== Studio albums ===
- The B-Suite (2009)
- The Noise in the Sky (2012)

== See also ==
- Justice
- SebastiAn
- Ed Banger Records
