= Ed Banger Records =

French electronic music record label

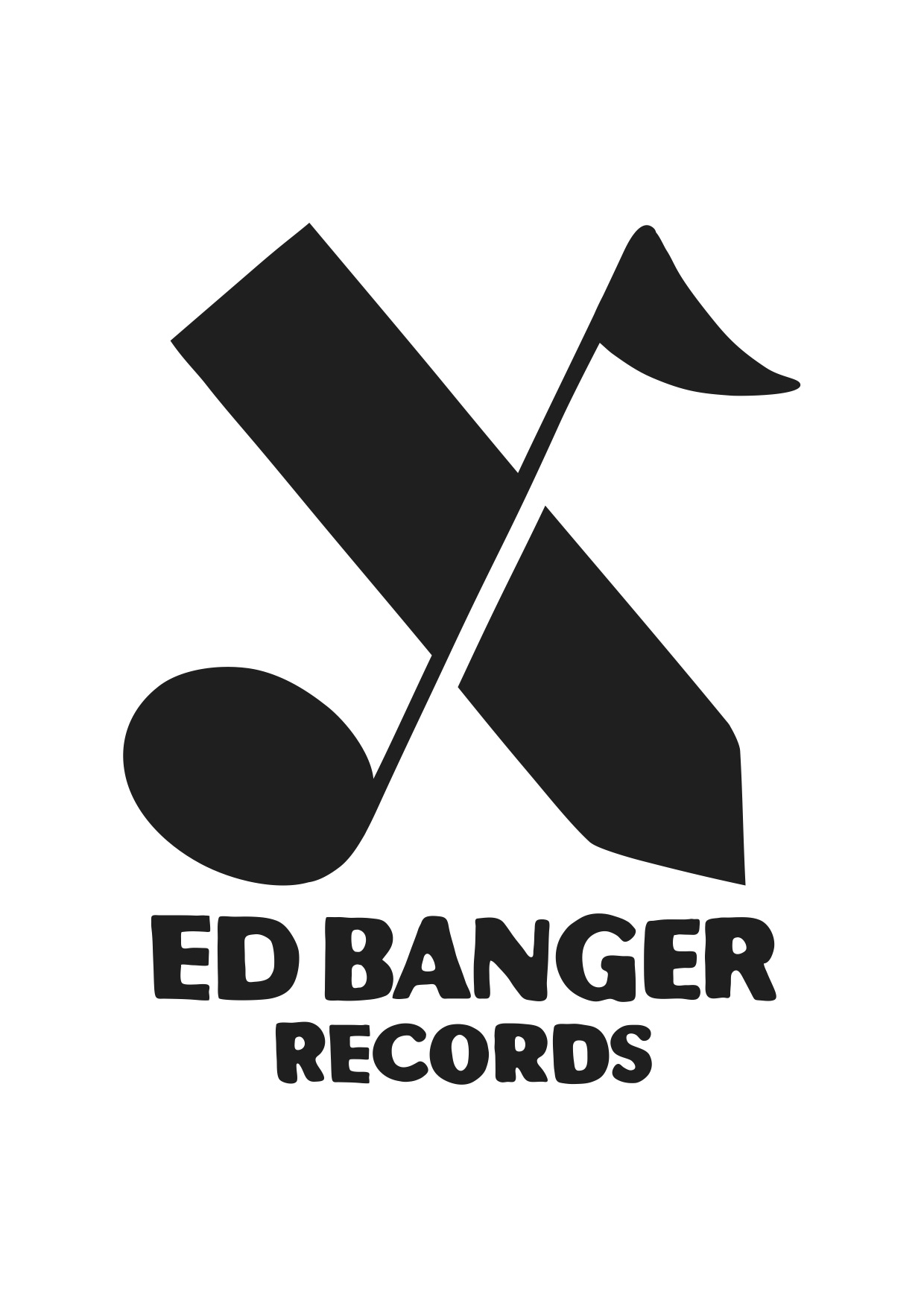
- Parent company: Headbangers Entertainment
- Founded: 2003; 23 years ago
- Founder: Pedro Winter
- Distributors: Because Music; Virgin Music Group
- Genre: Electronic; house
- Country of origin: France
- Location: Paris
- Official website: edbangerrecords.com

Ed Banger Records (sometimes referred to as Ed Rec) is a French electronic music record label founded by Pedro Winter in 2003 as a division of Headbangers Entertainment. It focuses on house music, particularly French house, as well as alternative dance, electro, hip-hop, nu disco, and synthpop, among other styles. The label is home to French acts Justice, SebastiAn, Breakbot, Cassius, DJ Mehdi, Mr. Oizo, Uffie, Myd, Krazy Baldhead, Mr. Flash, So Me, Feadz, and Winter himself under the alias Busy P. Most videos and album art for Ed Banger releases are coordinated by So Me.

== History ==
The label enjoyed a dramatic rise in fame in early 2007 when a number of the artists signed to its roster found mainstream success, most notably French electronic group Justice, whose rework of "Never Be Alone" by now defunct electro-rock band Simian, was a success in clubs worldwide, entering the UK charts at No. 20. The music video for the single won the award for best video at the MTV Europe Music Awards in 2006. Labelmate Uffie also enjoyed a rise in fame in late 2006 when her single, "Pop the Glock", gained international radio play.

In 2018, Ed Banger celebrated its 15th anniversary. To celebrate this anniversary, Pedro Winter organized a concert on 31 March 2018 at the Grand Rex with covers of the label's flagship titles, old or recent, played by a symphony orchestra of 70 musicians (Orchestre Lamoureux) conducted by Thomas Roussel.

== Collaborations ==
To commemorate the label's tenth anniversary and the 20th anniversary of Girl Distribution Company, an Ed Banger series of skateboard decks was released in July 2013, in addition to a remixed video part for Girl's team rider Sean Malto. The artwork on the skateboard decks was inspired by artists Mr. Oizo, Breakbot, Justice, Sebastian and Busy P, while Malto's part was edited to music by Justice and Mr. Oizo.

== Artists ==
Current roster

- Breakbot
- Busy P
- Feadz
- Justice
- Krazy Baldhead
- Laurent Garnier
- Mr. Oizo
- Myd
- Pierre Rousseau
- SebastiAn
- So Me

Past members

- Cassius
- DJ Mehdi
- Mr. Flash
- Para One
- Riton
- Uffie
- Vladimir Cauchemar

Collaborations

- Carte Blanche (DJ Mehdi + Riton)
- Ed Banger House Party (Busy P + Para One + Boston Bun)
- Handbraekes (Mr. Oizo + Boys Noize)

== See also ==
- List of record labels
- Girl Distribution Company
