= Hyperdrama =

Studio album by Justice
- Released: 26 April 2024
- Genres: French house; synthwave
- Length: 49:12
- Labels: Genesis; Ed Banger; Because
- Producer: Justice

Justice chronology
Woman Worldwide (2018)	Hyperdrama (2024)	Grand Theft Auto VI: Original Score (2026)

Singles from Hyperdrama
- 1. "One Night/All Night" / "Generator" Released: 24 January 2024; 2. "Incognito" Released: 6 March 2024; 3. "Saturnine" Released: 20 March 2024; 4. "Neverender" Released: 26 September 2024; 5. "Afterimage" Released: 30 April 2025; 6. "Mannequin Love" Released: 16 July 2025

Hyperdrama is the fourth studio album by French electronic music duo Justice, released on 26 April 2024 through Ed Banger Records and Because Music. It is their first studio album in over seven years, following Woman (2016). The album was preceded by the singles "One Night/All Night" with Tame Impala, and "Generator", which were released together alongside its announcement, followed by "Incognito" and later "Saturnine" with Miguel.

The album received generally positive reviews from critics. Hyperdrama also earned a Grammy Award nomination in the category of Best Dance/Electronic Album, with "Neverender", featuring Tame Impala winning the Grammy for Best Dance/Electronic Recording. The duo toured North and South America, Europe and Australia in support of the album from April 2024 to December 2025, beginning with a performance at Coachella.

== Background ==
The album title was first announced on 18 January 2024. In a statement released with the official album announcement a week later, Justice said that "Disco/funk and electronic music at large have always been core elements of the music we make as Justice. In Hyperdrama, we make them coexist, but not in a peaceful way. We like this idea of making them fight a bit for attention." In regards to "One Night/All Night", they elaborated that it "oscillates between pure electronic music and pure disco but you never really get the two at the same time", and wanted it to sound like a "disco iteration of Kevin Parker". On "Incognito", the duo said they "had to unlearn everything" they knew about song structures when they started work on the album, which, according to them, was "very refreshing".

The band discussed the music production for Hyperdrama on Mix With The Masters. The majority of the sounds for the album came from the PPG Wave 2.2 synthesizer. The synthesizer was discovered while Gaspard Augé was recording his Escapades album in 2021.

"Dear Alan" is a tribute to Alan Braxe and Chris Rainbow. Justice member Xavier de Rosnay stated, "It's more of an inside joke than anything, but in the realm of electronic music, he's been an inspiration for us from the beginning. He's always had this kind of melancholic thing to his music that a lot of other bands from the french touch first wave don't really have. For us, the [music] is more like shiny club music that's very euphoric. Alan Braxe was always a bit less dancey but a bit more melancholic and elegant in a way, and that touches us a lot more than straight dance music." The track uses a sample of "Dear Brian" by Chris Rainbow. The sampled song is a tribute to Brian Wilson of the Beach Boys. "For a long time, the working name of our track was 'Dear Brian' and when we had to give it a proper name, we were like [...] the vocal sample reminds us of Alan Braxe, let's call it Dear Alan. It's a way for us to pay tribute to Alan Braxe and also Chris Rainbow."

== Album title and art ==
De Rosnay explained to Rolling Stone Australia that the title of the album came about when the duo 'wanted to forge a word that didn't exist. "Melodrama" had the right vibe — theatrical, over-the-top, full of story. That was the launchpad. Then it mutated: "melo" became "ultra," then "hyper." Suddenly it clicked — fast, high-pressure, cutting-edge.' The album art depicts the Justice cross symbol as "a transparent 3D casing that houses a macabre living entity." This version of the cross motif, which first appeared as a simple outline on their debut album Cross, was designed by art director and Justice's long-time collaborator Thomas Jumin and itself took a year and a half to produce.

== Critical reception ==
Professional ratings
Aggregate scores
Source	Rating
Metacritic	71/100
Review scores
Source	Rating
AllMusic	3/5 stars
The Arts Desk	3/5 stars
Exclaim!	7/10
The Independent	6/10
The Line of Best Fit	6/10
Mojo	3/5 stars
NME	5/5 stars
The Observer	3/5 stars
Pitchfork	6.3/10
The Skinny	4/5 stars

Hyperdrama received a score of 71 out of 100 on review aggregator Metacritic based on 15 critics' reviews, which the website categorised as "generally favorable" reception. Andy Cowan of Mojo stated that Hyperdrama "catches Xavier de Rosnay and Gaspard Augé hedging their bets between playing to their old strengths or going for the pop jugular. [The album] excels when they try to out-Justice themselves [...] Ultimately hit and miss, Justice's gift for arena-friendly hooks remains undimmed." In a five-star review, Thomas Smith of NME called the album "a blockbuster release that meets the hype: flashy, over the top and keen to make a spectacle". He further emphasised that the album falls into "the type of release that the dance space – if you could even slot Justice in there – seldom sees".

Rhys Morgan of The Skinny stated that while some may find the opening ("Neverender") discordant with its dreamy soundscape followed by darker tones, the album ultimately finds its groove through a "watercolour of synthwave" and "pared back French house", culminating in a satisfying fusion. Mason Oldridge of The Independent noted that Hyperdrama blends disco and funk with Justice's signature electronic sound. While he was favourable towards the Tame Impala collaboration "One Night/All Night", he was critical of the album's generally "lighter" sound compared to the group's previous releases like their debut album, which he said might disappoint fans who prefer their heavier beats.

Reviewing the album for Pitchfork, Philip Sherburne called it "sleekly aerodynamic" and "expensively appointed" but remarked that "Justice have never sounded more polished" and "actual tension—the kind of friction that once made Justice's music feel so vital—is otherwise frustratingly hard to find". Likewise, Ammar Kalia's mixed review for The Observer remarked that Justice "find themselves too polished and bright" on Hyperdrama and are "on less steady ground" during softer moments such as the track "One Night/All Night", where guest vocalist Kevin Parker's falsetto vocals are drowned out by the backing instrumentation. Jason Heffler of EDM.com praised the album's direction, noting that Justice "transcend the simple pleasures of body music to speak to the tragedies, triumphs and bittersweet complexities that loom over the dancefloor's euphoric release" and "bleed candor and restless yearning without abandoning their roots."

In his year-end "10 best albums of 2024," Russell Falcon for KTLA in Los Angeles ranked "Hyperdrama" no. 6, writing that it served as a "welcome embrace for those who've never forgotten [2007's "Cross"]" and one that fit perfectly into the year of "Brat."

== Track listing ==
Hyperdrama track listing
No.	Title	Writer(s)	Length
1.	"Neverender" (featuring Tame Impala)	Gaspard Augé; Xavier de Rosnay; Kevin Parker	4:26
2.	"Generator"	Augé; de Rosnay	4:42
3.	"Afterimage" (featuring Rimon)	Augé; de Rosnay; Rimon Bahere	4:05
4.	"One Night/All Night" (featuring Tame Impala)	Augé; de Rosnay; Jorn C. J. Hanneman; Parker	4:36
5.	"Dear Alan"	Augé; de Rosnay; Christopher James Harley	5:33
6.	"Incognito"	Augé; de Rosnay	4:01
7.	"Mannequin Love" (featuring The Flints)	Augé; de Rosnay; George Flint; Henry Flint	3:27
8.	"Moonlight Rendez-vous"	Augé; de Rosnay	2:00
9.	"Explorer" (with Connan Mockasin)	Augé; de Rosnay; Connan Hosford	4:09
10.	"Muscle Memory"	Augé; de Rosnay	4:10
11.	"Harpy Dream"	Augé; de Rosnay	0:28
12.	"Saturnine" (featuring Miguel)	Augé; de Rosnay; Miguel Pimentel	3:21
13.	"The End" (featuring Thundercat)	Augé; de Rosnay; Stephen Lee Bruner	4:14
Total length:			49:12

Notes

- "One Night/All Night" contains an interpolation of "Go with the Flow" by Jeremy, composed by Jorn C. J. Hanneman.
- "Dear Alan" contains a sample of "Dear Brian" by Chris Rainbow, written and composed by Christopher James Harley.
- "Incognito" contains a sample of "New Dream" by Clay Pedrini, written by Manilo Cangelli and Lorella Ghilardi.

== Personnel ==
Justice

- Gaspard Augé – production, mixing
- Xavier de Rosnay – production, mixing

Additional musicians

- Vincent Taeger – bottle percussion (track 1), live drums (3–6, 9, 13)
- Tame Impala – vocals (tracks 1, 4)
- Vincent Ségal – cello (track 2)
- Guillaume Becker – viola (track 2)
- Cécile Roubin – violin (track 2)
- Manuel Doutrelant – violin (track 2)
- Rimon – vocals (track 3)
- Antoine Poyeton – live drums (tracks 6–9, 13)
- Louis Bes – live drums (tracks 6–9, 13)
- Vincent Taurelle – live drums (tracks 6–9, 13)
- Roger Joseph Manning Jr. – Wurlitzer electric piano, noise (track 6)
- The Flints – vocals (track 7)
- Victor Le Masne – additional piano (track 8)
- Adrien Soleiman – saxophone (track 8)
- Connan Mockasin – vocals (track 9)
- Miguel – vocals (track 12)
- Thundercat – vocals (track 13)

Technical

- Damien Quintard – mastering
- Vincent Taurelle – mixing assistance (all tracks), string engineering (track 2), live drum engineering (3–9, 13), additional synthesizer production (3–7, 13), additional engineering (6–9, 13), additional arrangement (3, 5)
- Antoine Poyeton – live drum engineering, additional engineering (tracks 6–9, 13)
- Louis Bes – live drum engineering, additional engineering (tracks 6–9, 13)
- Lucas Glastra – string engineering assistance (track 2), live drum engineering assistance (3–6)
- Rémi Dumelz – string engineering assistance (track 2), live drum engineering assistance (3–6)

Visuals

- Thomas Jumin – artwork, front cover painting, spaceship design
- André Chemetoff – back cover photograph
- Julia & Vincent – gatefold and inner sleeves photographs
- Pascal Teixeira – spaceship design
- Marina Monge – styling

== Charts ==
=== Weekly charts ===
Weekly chart performance for Hyperdrama
Chart (2024)	Peak position
Australian Albums (ARIA)	52
Austrian Albums (Ö3 Austria)	10
Belgian Albums (Ultratop Flanders)	14
Belgian Albums (Ultratop Wallonia)	2
Canadian Albums (Billboard)	91
Dutch Albums (Album Top 100)	38
French Albums (SNEP)	2
German Albums (Offizielle Top 100)	14
Japanese Digital Albums (Oricon)	38
Japanese Hot Albums (Billboard Japan)	87
Portuguese Albums (AFP)	141
Scottish Albums (Official Charts)	13
Swiss Albums (Schweizer Hitparade)	4
UK Albums (Official Charts)	34
UK Dance Albums (Official Charts)	1
UK Independent Albums (Official Charts)	3
US Billboard 200	96
US Independent Albums (Billboard)	16
US Top Dance Albums (Billboard)	1

=== Year-end charts ===
Year-end chart performance for Hyperdrama
Chart (2024)	Position
French Albums (SNEP)	152
