= New Lands (song) =

Single by Justice

from the album Audio, Video, Disco
- Released: 24 June 2012
- Genre: Electroclash; nu-disco; electronic rock
- Length: 4:14
- Label: Ed Banger; Because
- Songwriters: Gaspard Augé; Xavier de Rosnay; Morgan Phalen
- Producer: Justice

Justice singles chronology
"On'n'On" (2012)	"New Lands" (2012)	"Helix" (2013)

Music video
- "New Lands" on YouTube

"New Lands" is a single by the French band Justice, the fourth in their second studio album Audio, Video, Disco. The track features collaborative vocals from Morgan Phalen, who also contributed to the lyrics. It was released digitally on the 24th of June 2012 alongside remixes from A-Trak and Ed Banger Records labelmate SebastiAn.

== Music video ==
The music video was written, directed, and edited by Spanish company CANADA. Filmed in Barcelona, it follows the progress of a futuristic and violent "Rollerball-style" sports game. Red Bull Media House published the video on their YouTube channel on July 11th 2012, and were also involved in the production and stunt coordination on-set.

== Track listing ==
- Digital download EP
1. "New Lands" – 4:14
2. "New Lands (Live)" – 4:33
3. "New Lands (DJ Falcon Remix)" – 4:46
4. "New Lands (A-Trak Remix)" – 6:40
5. "New Lands (SebastiAn Remix)" – 4:51
- 12" Vinyl EP

A1. "New Lands (DJ Falcon Remix)" – 4:46
A2. "New Lands (Live)" – 4:33
B1. "New Lands (A-Trak Remix)" – 6:40
B2. "New Lands (SebastiAn Remix)" – 4:50

== Charts ==
Chart (2012)	Peak position
UK Physical Singles Chart (OCC)	37
