= Audio, Video, Disco =

Studio album by Justice
- Released: 24 October 2011
- Recorded: 1 February 2010 – 15 June 2011 in Paris, France
- Genres: Electronic; electronic rock
- Length: 46:25
- Labels: Ed Banger; Because
- Producers: Gaspard Augé; Xavier de Rosnay

Justice chronology
| A Cross the Universe (2008) | Audio, Video, Disco (2011) | Access All Arenas (2013) |

Singles from Audio, Video, Disco
- 1. "Civilization" Released: 28 March 2011; 2. "Audio, Video, Disco" Released: 26 September 2011; 3. "On'n'On" Released: 30 January 2012; 4. "New Lands" Released: 24 June 2012; 5. "Helix" Released: 7 January 2013

Audio, Video, Disco (Note: Stylised as Audio, Video, Disco. (with a full stop)) is the second studio album by French electronic music duo Justice, released on 24 October 2011 by Ed Banger Records and Because Music in France, and Elektra Records in the US.

The album received positive reviews from critics and had a positive commercial performance. Five singles were released from the album, which were "Civilization", the title track, "On'n'On", "New Lands" and "Helix".

== Background ==
Justice member Xavier de Rosnay has said of Audio, Video, Disco's musical style: "We wanted to create something very laid back and a bit countryside-ish. You know, daytime music. [...] What we wanted to do was keep the beats, but make it more soft. One of the challenges of this record was to make it feel emotionally heavy without being aggressive. Like being soft and violent at the same time. The texture of the new record is really soft." The album also features more collaborations than on the band's debut album †.

== Singles ==
The album's first single, "Civilization", was released digitally on 28 March 2011.

"Audio, Video, Disco" was confirmed as the second single and was originally intended to be released on 19 September 2011; the single was eventually expanded into an EP and was released on 26 September 2011. A preview of the single was released on 19 August 2011, via the BBC website. The official music video was released on 6 September 2011 via the band's Facebook page.

On 21 August, producer Busy P released a one-minute-long sample of "Helix" in his 2011 Fall Delivery Mix, as well as a two-minute sample of the Para One remix of "Audio, Video, Disco".

On 13 December 2011, it was announced on the band's Facebook page that "On'n'On" would be the next single, released in late January 2012. Along with the announcement, they also revealed the single artwork, created by Surface to Air and that the package would include remixes of "On'n'On" by Rick Rubin, Brodinski and Video Village and two remixes of "Canon"—another track from Audio, Video, Disco—by Erol Alkan and Tiga.

In June 2012, they released the fourth single, "New Lands". It features remixes from A-Trak and Ed Banger labelmate SebastiAn.

"Helix", the fifth single from the album, was released on 7 January 2013. The EP features remixes from Gesaffelstein and Domenico Torti. It also includes "Presence", a composition that was a hidden track at the end of "Audio, Video, Disco".

== Critical reception ==
Professional ratings
Aggregate scores
| Source | Rating |
|---|---|
| AnyDecentMusic? | 6.5/10 |
| Metacritic | 69/100 |
Review scores
| Source | Rating |
| AllMusic | 4/5 stars |
| The A.V. Club | A− |
| Clash | 8/10 |
| Consequence of Sound | 3.5/5 stars |
| The Guardian | 4/5 stars |
| NME | 8/10 |
| Pitchfork | 5.3/10 |
| PopMatters | 8/10 stars |
| Rolling Stone | 3/5 stars |
| Spin | 6/10 |

The album has received generally positive reviews from critics, though it received less critical acclaim than its predecessor, †. It currently holds a 69 rating (out of 100) on Metacritic. Australia's Triple J radio station had the album as their feature album of the week from 24 to 30 October 2011.

== Commercial performance ==
In 2012, it was awarded a gold certification from the Independent Music Companies Association which indicated sales of at least 75,000 copies throughout Europe.

== Track listing ==
The album's track listing was revealed by Xavier de Rosnay in an interview with Tsugi magazine on 5 July 2011.

Audio, Video, Disco track listing
| No. | Title | Length |
|---|---|---|
| 1. | "Horsepower" | 3:40 |
| 2. | "Civilization" (vocals by Ali Love) | 3:39 |
| 3. | "Ohio" (vocals by Vincent Vendetta of Midnight Juggernauts) | 4:01 |
| 4. | "Canon (Primo)" | 0:27 |
| 5. | "Canon" | 3:39 |
| 6. | "On'n'On" (vocals by Morgan Phalen) | 4:30 |
| 7. | "Brianvision" | 3:11 |
| 8. | "Parade" | 4:01 |
| 9. | "New Lands" (vocals by Morgan Phalen) | 4:14 |
| 10. | "Helix" | 4:28 |
| 11. | "Audio, Video, Disco" (Includes "Presence" as a hidden track) | 4:52 |
| Total length: | | 46:25 |

iTunes bonus tracks
| No. | Title | Length |
|---|---|---|
| 12. | "Planisphère" | 17:39 |
| 13. | "Civilization" (music video) | 3:48 |
| 14. | "Audio, Video, Disco" (music video) | 3:45 |

Japanese bonus tracks
| No. | Title | Length |
|---|---|---|
| 12. | "Civilization" (demo version) | 3:38 |

== Charts ==
=== Weekly charts ===
Weekly chart performance for Audio, Video, Disco
| Chart (2011) | Peak position |
|---|---|
| Australian Albums (ARIA) | 18 |
| Austrian Albums (Ö3 Austria) | 49 |
| Belgian Albums (Ultratop Flanders) | 24 |
| Belgian Albums (Ultratop Wallonia) | 10 |
| Canadian Albums (Billboard) | 22 |
| Danish Albums (Hitlisten) | 27 |
| Dutch Albums (Album Top 100) | 97 |
| French Albums (SNEP) | 5 |
| German Albums (Offizielle Top 100) | 67 |
| Irish Albums (IRMA) | 33 |
| Italian Albums (FIMI) | 59 |
| Spanish Albums (Promusicae) | 71 |
| Swiss Albums (Schweizer Hitparade) | 15 |
| UK Albums (Official Charts) | 35 |
| UK Dance Albums (Official Charts) | 2 |
| US Billboard 200 | 37 |
| US Top Dance Albums (Billboard) | 4 |

=== Year-end charts ===
Year-end chart performance for Audio, Video, Disco
| Chart (2011) | Rank |
|---|---|
| French Albums Chart | 194 |
