= List of Billboard number-one electronic albums of 2024 =

These are the albums that reached number one on the Billboard Dance/Electronic Albums chart in 2024.

== Chart history ==
Key
†	Indicates best-performing album of 2024

List of number-one albums
Issue date	Album	Artist	Reference
January 6	Renaissance	Beyoncé	
January 13	Renaissance	Beyoncé	
January 20	Renaissance	Beyoncé	
January 27	The Fame	Lady Gaga	
February 3	The Fame	Lady Gaga	
February 10	The Fame	Lady Gaga	
February 17	The Fame	Lady Gaga	
February 24	Renaissance	Beyoncé	
March 2	The Fame	Lady Gaga	
March 9	The Fame	Lady Gaga	
March 16	The Fame	Lady Gaga	
March 23	The Fame	Lady Gaga	
March 30	The Fame	Lady Gaga	
April 6	The Fame	Lady Gaga	
April 13	Renaissance	Beyoncé	
April 20	The Fame	Lady Gaga	
April 27	The Fame	Lady Gaga	
May 4	The Fame	Lady Gaga	
May 11	Hyperdrama	Justice	
May 18	The Fame	Lady Gaga	
May 25	The Fame	Lady Gaga	
June 1	The Fame	Lady Gaga	
June 8	The Fame	Lady Gaga	
June 15	The Fame	Lady Gaga	
June 22	Brat †	Charli XCX	
June 29	Brat †	Charli XCX	
July 6	Brat †	Charli XCX	
July 13	Brat †	Charli XCX	
July 20	Brat †	Charli XCX	
July 27	Brat †	Charli XCX	
August 3	Brat †	Charli XCX	
August 10	Brat †	Charli XCX	
August 17	Brat †	Charli XCX	
August 24	Brat †	Charli XCX	
August 31	Brat †	Charli XCX	
September 7	Brat †	Charli XCX	
September 14	Brat †	Charli XCX	
September 21	Brat †	Charli XCX	
September 28	Brat †	Charli XCX	
October 5	Brat †	Charli XCX	
October 12	Brat †	Charli XCX	
October 19	Brat †	Charli XCX	
October 26	Brat †	Charli XCX	
November 2	Brat †	Charli XCX	
November 9	Brat †	Charli XCX	
November 16	Brat †	Charli XCX	
November 23	Brat †	Charli XCX	
November 30	Brat †	Charli XCX	
December 7	Brat †	Charli XCX	
December 14	Brat †	Charli XCX	
December 21	Brat †	Charli XCX	
December 28	Brat †	Charli XCX	
