= One Night/All Night =

Single by Justice and Tame Impala

from the album Hyperdrama
- A-side: "Generator" (double A-side)
- Released: 24 January 2024
- Genre: Electronic
- Length: 4:36
- Label: Ed Banger
- Composers: Gaspard Augé; Xavier de Rosnay; J. C. J. Hanneman; Kevin Parker
- Lyricists: J. C. J. Hanneman; Kevin Parker
- Producer: Justice

Justice singles chronology
"Love S.O.S. (WWW)" (2018)	"One Night/All Night" / "Generator" (2024)	"Incognito" (2024)

Tame Impala singles chronology
"No More Lies" (2023)	"One Night/All Night" (2024)	"Neverender" (2024)

Music video
- "One Night/All Night" on YouTube

"One Night/All Night" is a song by French electronic music duo Justice and Australian music project Tame Impala. Released on 24 January 2024, it was the duo's first new music in almost eight years, following their 2016 studio album Woman. The song serves as the lead single of their 2024 album Hyperdrama, together as a double A-side with "Generator", another track from the album.

== Background ==
Gaspard Augé and Xavier de Rosnay (the two members of Justice) described their thought processes behind both "One Night/All Night" and "Generator" in a press release for Rolling Stone:

"We wanted ['One Night/All Night'] to sound as if a dark / techno iteration of Justice had found a sample of a disco iteration of Kevin Parker. Kevin has a sense of melody that’s fascinating in the sense that he manages to write melodies that feel both simple and natural, but very peculiar at the same time. This song oscillates between pure electronic music and pure disco but you never really get the two at the same time. This very idea of switching instantly from a genre to another within a song runs through the whole record, and is maybe showcased the clearest in ‘One Night/All Night.’ [...] To us, ['Generator'] sounds like ‘Getaway’ by the Salsoul Orchestra, but with gabber and classic ’90s hardcore techno sounds. Disco / funk and electronic music at large have always been core elements of the music we make as Justice. In Hyperdrama, we make them coexist, but not in a peaceful way. We like this idea of making them fight a bit for attention."

== Release and reception ==
Justice first alluded to new music with a post made to their Instagram account on 1 January 2024, which was followed up with further teasers that culminated in the official announcement of "One Night/All Night" and its parent album Hyperdrama – as well as a short snippet of the aforementioned track – on 17 January 2024.

Upon release, the lead single was met with a primarily positive reception. Stereogum called the track a "heavy-hitter", noting how the vocals by Kevin Parker of Tame Impala "[paint] smooth neon falsetto all over the baseline synth-stomp", Stereogum further praised that the song by detailing how it "[soars] through disco-house galaxies and beyond the horizon towards somewhere harder, better, faster, stronger". Consequence characterized "One Night/All Night" as "slick disco groove [with] a throbbing, menacing air", while also describing "Generator" as "signature Justice with glitchy synths, crisp drums, and a gargantuan bass line". Stereogum also summarized the latter track as "a mechanistic instrumental that feels ideal for a sweaty robot rave".

== Personnel ==
Adapted from YouTube.

Musicians

- Vincent Taeger – drums
- Vincent Taurelle – synthesizer
- Tame Impala – vocals

Producers

- Justice – producer, mixing engineer
- Vincent Taurelle – mixing engineer
- Damien Quintard – mastering engineer

== Charts ==
Chart performance for "One Night/All Night"
Chart (2024)	Peak position
Japan Hot Overseas (Billboard Japan)	14
New Zealand Hot Singles (RMNZ)	27
US Hot Dance/Electronic Songs (Billboard)	10
