= Grammy Award for Best Dance/Electronic Recording =

American music award first given in 1998

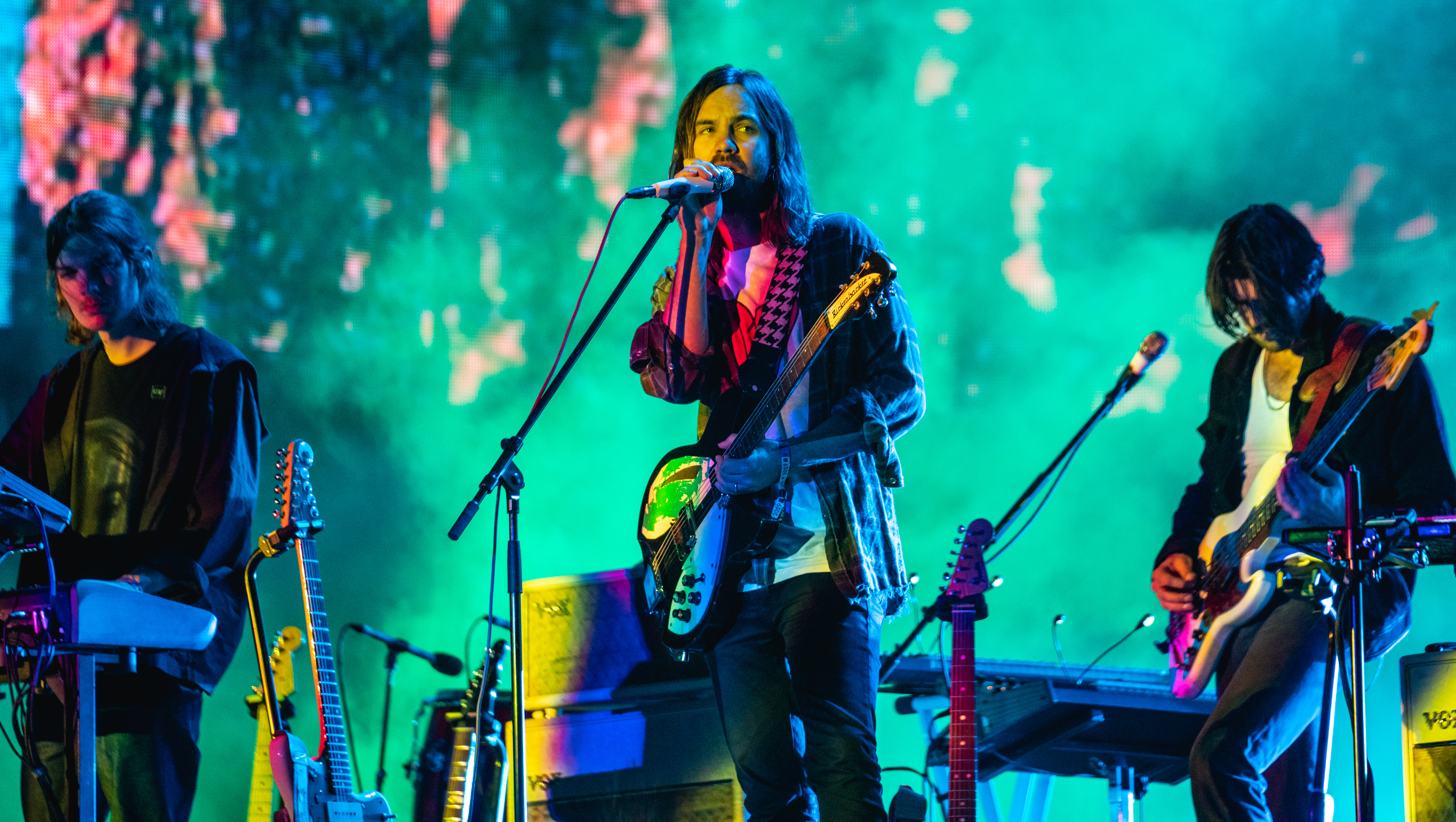
- "End of Summer" by Tame Impala, the 2026 recipient
- Awarded for: Quality vocal or instrumental dance music/electronic music performances
- Country: United States
- Presented by: National Academy of Recording Arts and Sciences
- First award: 1998

Highlights
- Most wins: Skrillex (4)
- Most nominations: Disclosure, Madonna, Skrillex (6)
- Website: grammy.com

The Grammy Award for Best Dance/Electronic Recording (formerly known as Best Dance Recording) is an award presented at the Grammy Awards, a ceremony that was established in 1958 and originally called the Gramophone Awards, to recording artists for works containing quality vocal performances in the dance music and/or electronic music genres. Honors in several categories are presented at the ceremony annually by the National Academy of Recording Arts and Sciences of the United States to "honor artistic achievement, technical proficiency and overall excellence in the recording industry, without regard to album sales or chart position".

The award for Best Dance Recording was first presented to Donna Summer and Giorgio Moroder in 1998 for the song "Carry On". In 2003, the Academy moved the category from the "Pop" field into a new "Dance" field, alongside the category Best Dance/Electronic Album. According to the Academy, the award is designated for solo, duo, group or collaborative performances (vocal or instrumental), and is limited to singles or tracks only.

The award goes to the artist, producer and mixer. The engineer and songwriter can apply for a Winners Certificate.

Skrillex has won the award a record four times, with Justin Timberlake, Diplo, The Chemical Brothers and Tame Impala winning twice. Skrillex, Bonobo, The Chemical Brothers and Madonna share the record for the most nominations, with five. Bonobo also holds the record for the most nominations without a win.

== History ==
Though she was not the first to suggest that the genre be recognized officially, Ellyn Harris and her Committee for the Advancement of Dance Music lobbied for more than two years to encourage the National Academy of Recording Arts and Sciences to acknowledge dance music. Some Academy members debated whether dance music, with its heavy use of layering, remixing, "lack of melody or verse", and numerous varieties, was truly considered music. Others were concerned that dance music was not a long-lasting genre, fearing the category would face retirement much like the award for Best Disco Recording, which was presented for one year only at the 22nd Grammy Awards in 1980.

In 1998, Harris' efforts paid off when the Academy first presented the award to Donna Summer and Giorgio Moroder at the 40th Grammy Awards for the song "Carry On". While the Academy had once been quoted as saying that "they considered dance music as something pop artists had created in their most frivolous moments", Ivan Bernstein, executive director of the organization's Florida branch, insisted that an award for excellence in dance music would not exist "if there were concerns about excellence".

Starting from the 64th Annual Grammy Awards in 2022, the category was renamed from Best Dance Recording to Best Dance/Electronic Recording. Starting from the 66th Annual Grammy Awards in 2024, a sister category Best Dance Pop Recording, was established in order to prevent well-established pop artists who incorporate dance music into their work from dominating the category over dedicated dance acts.

=== Criticism ===
Neil Tennant of the Pet Shop Boys has criticised the award, saying "there's always been a sense that people just think you've pressed a few buttons rather than do real music, the Grammys [...] kind of diss two huge massive genres at the same time by putting them together".

Writing for Mixmag, Annabel Ross noted a lack of gender and racial diversity associated with the award, claiming that one "might assume, judging by the winners and nominees [in the category] that the best dance music is made by white people (mostly men), and that commercial success is a marker of quality".

== Recipients ==
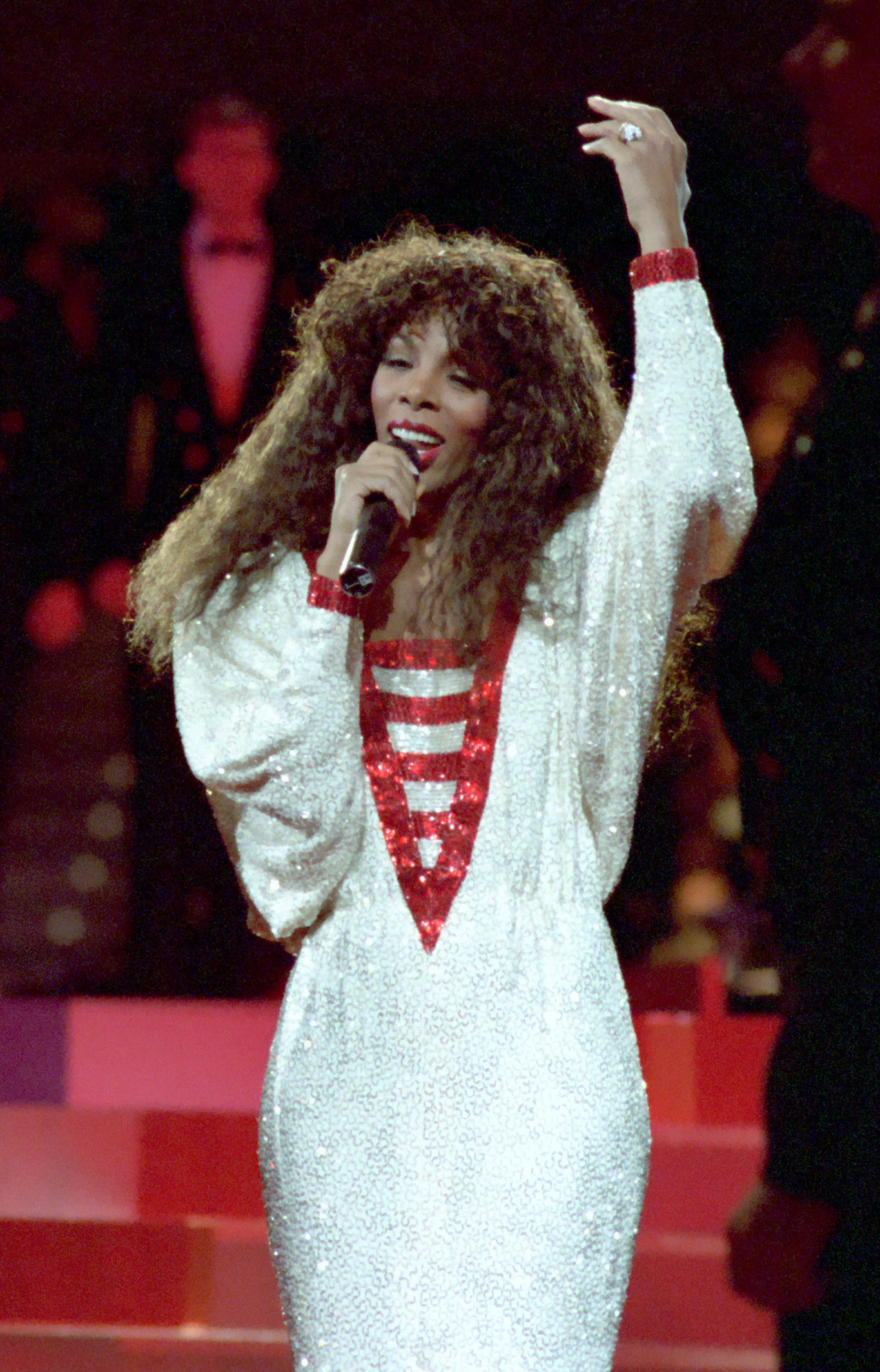
Donna Summer was the first recipient of the award in 1998 alongside Giorgio Moroder.

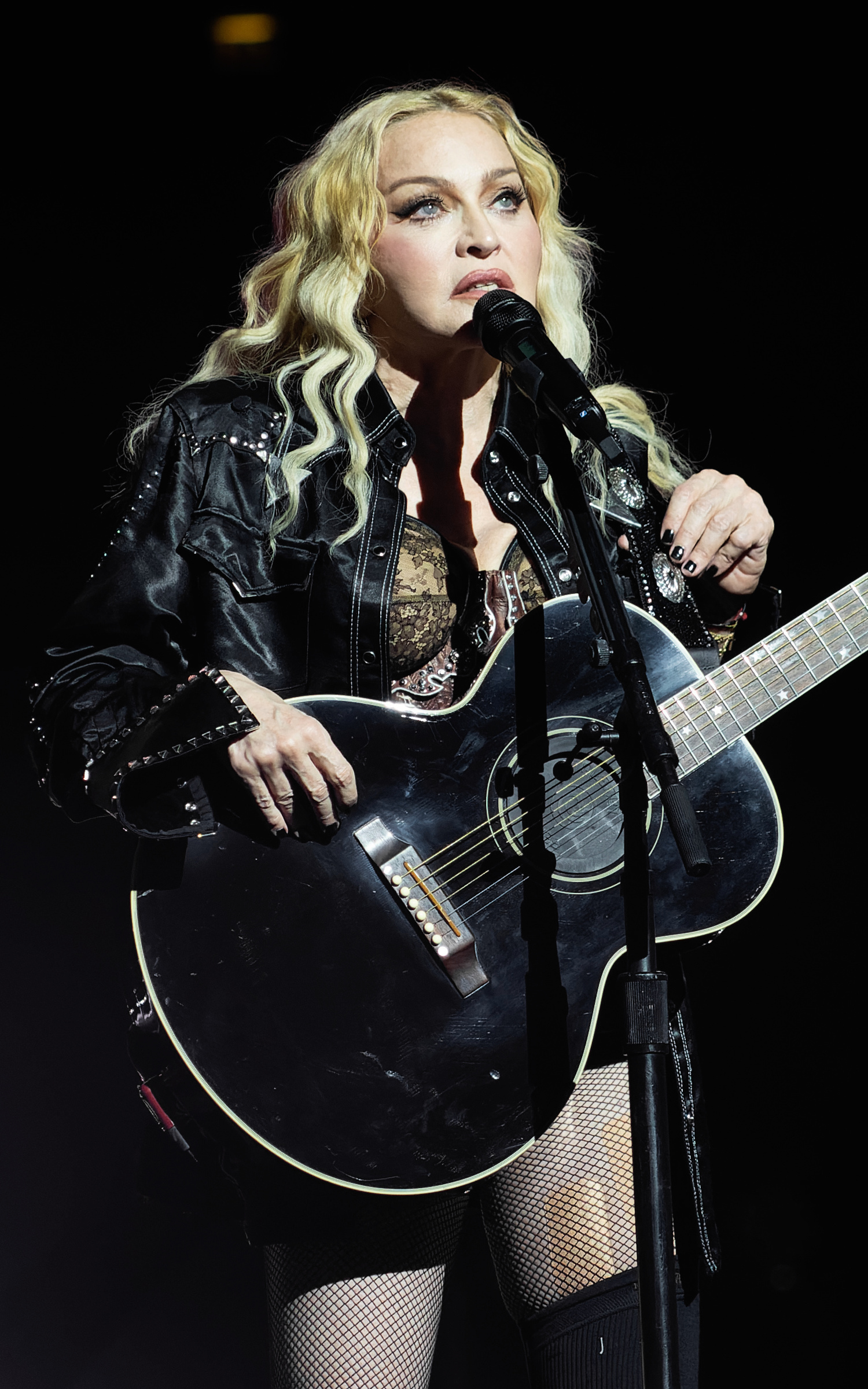
1999 award winner, Madonna.

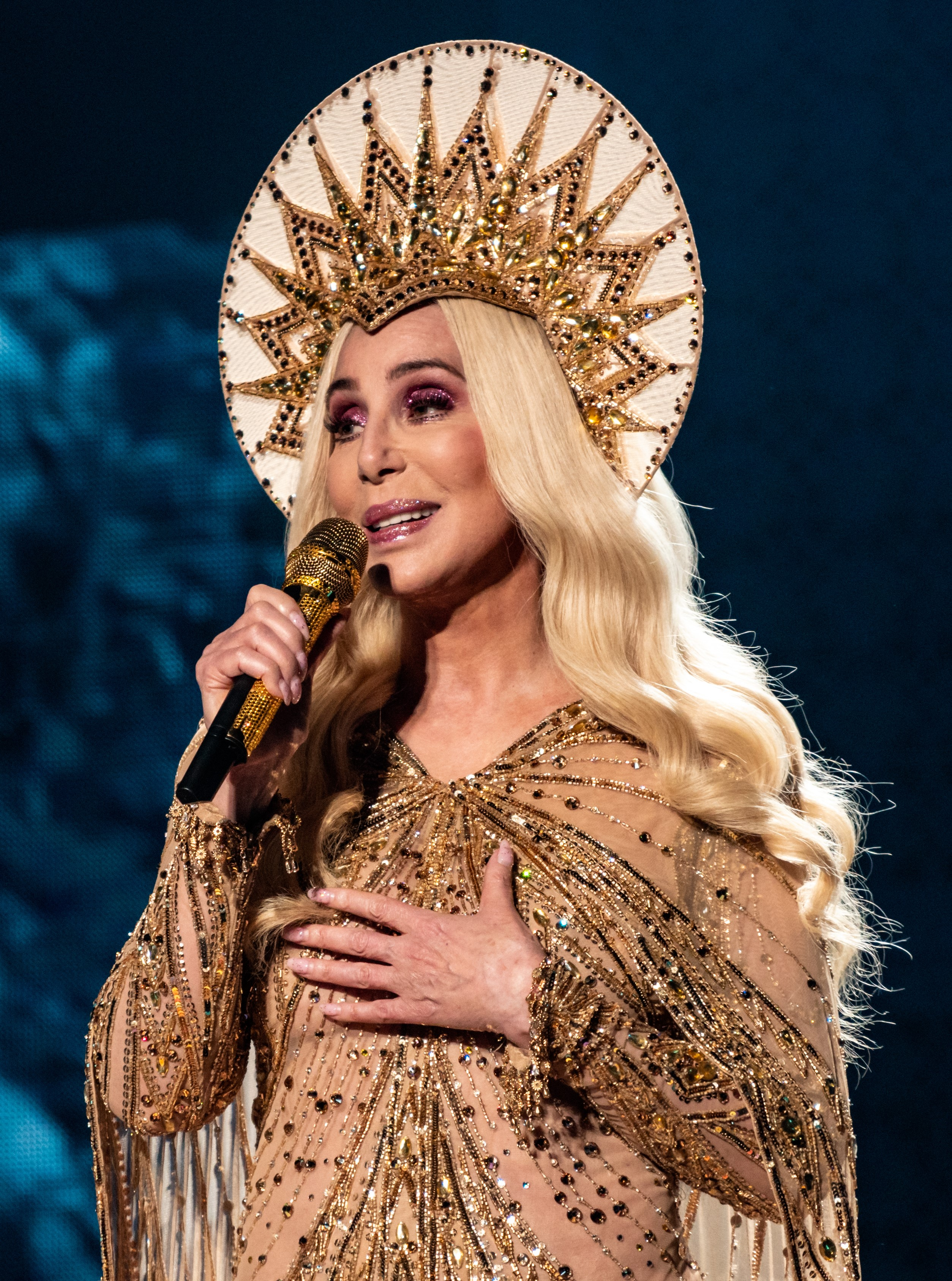
Cher won her first, and to date, only Grammy award in this category in 2000.

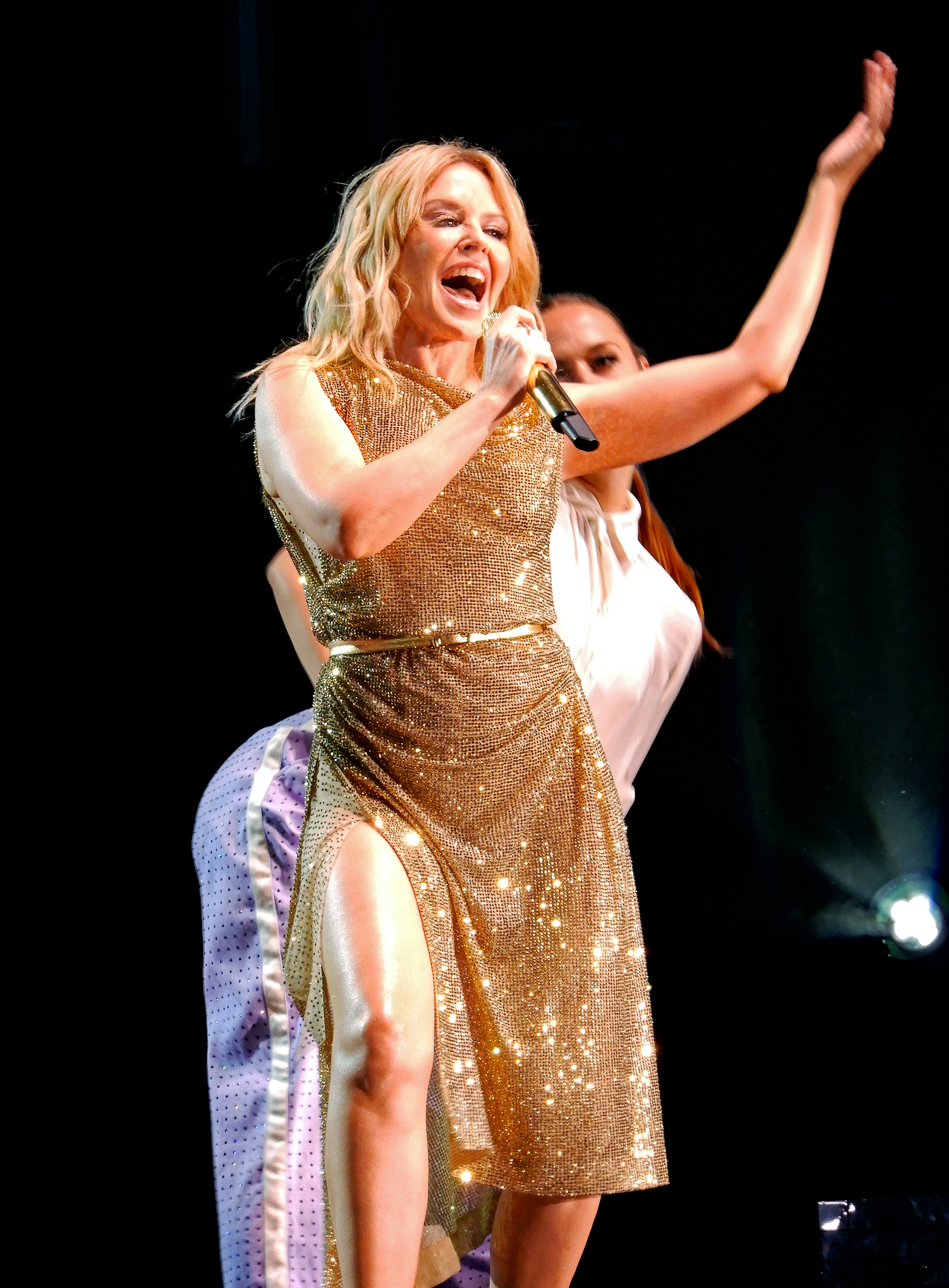
2004 winner and four-time Grammy nominee, Kylie Minogue.

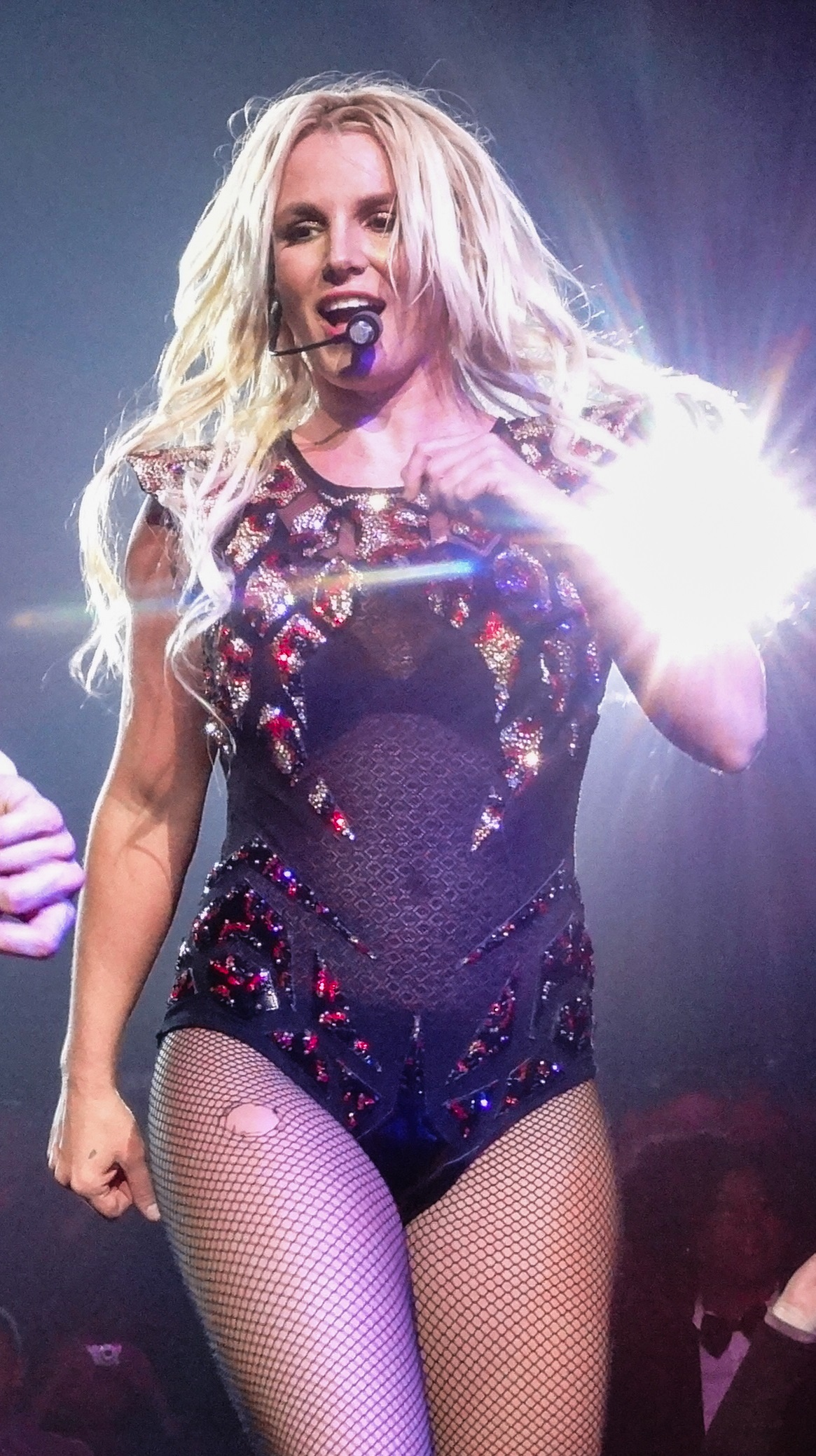
2005 winner and two-time nominee, Britney Spears.

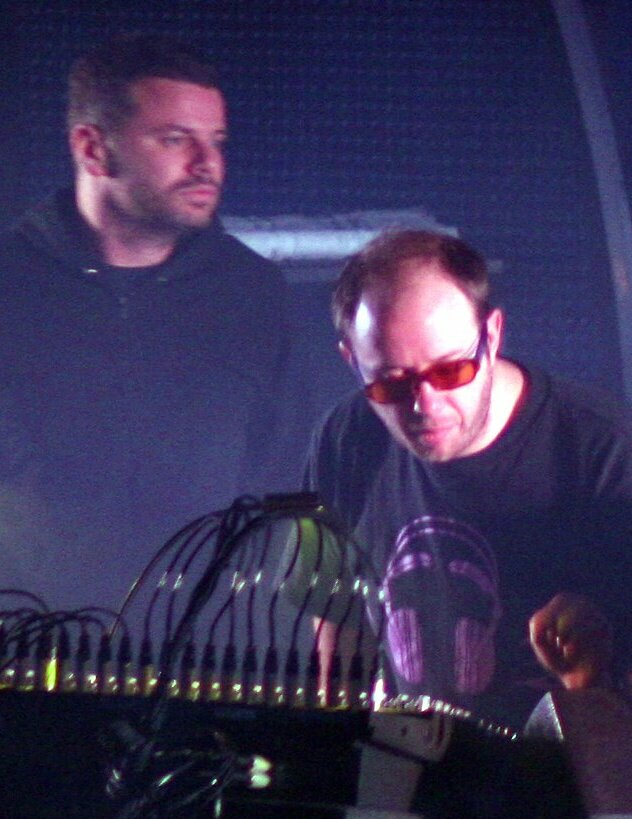
Two-time winners, The Chemical Brothers in 2006 and 2020.

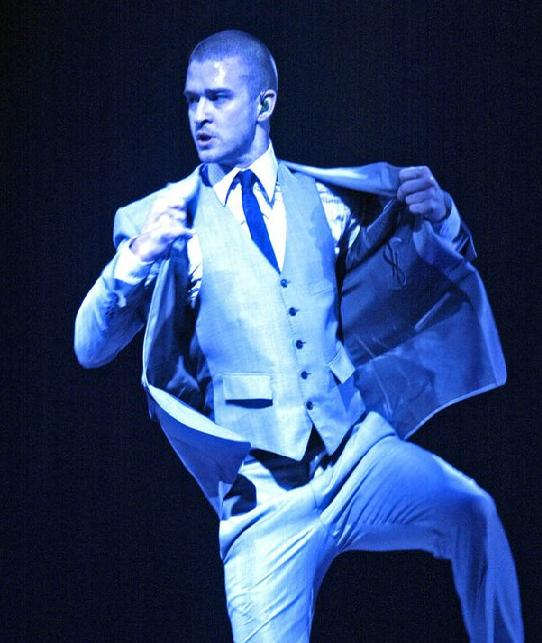
Two-time consecutive award winner, Justin Timberlake

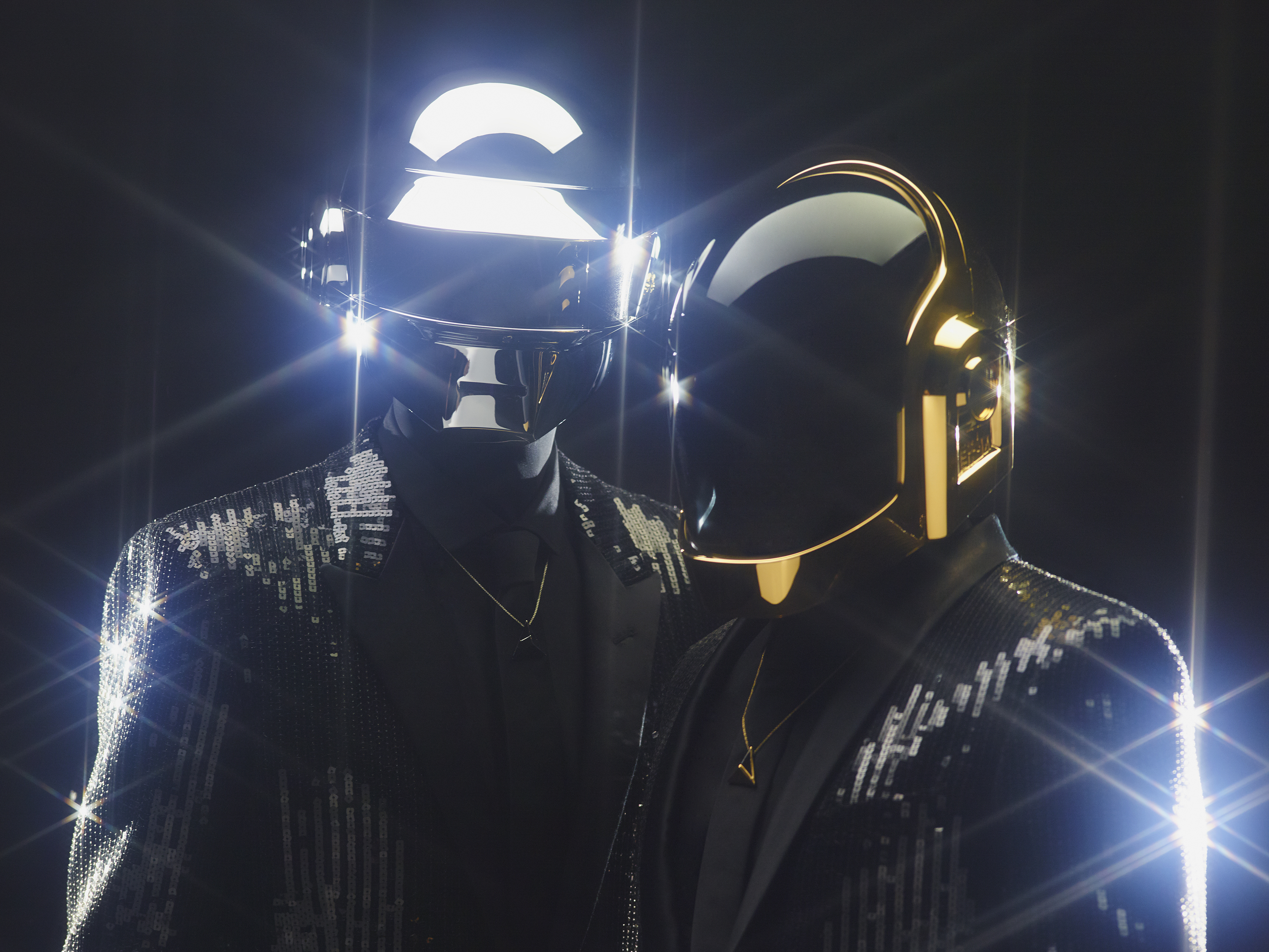
2009 award winners Daft Punk.

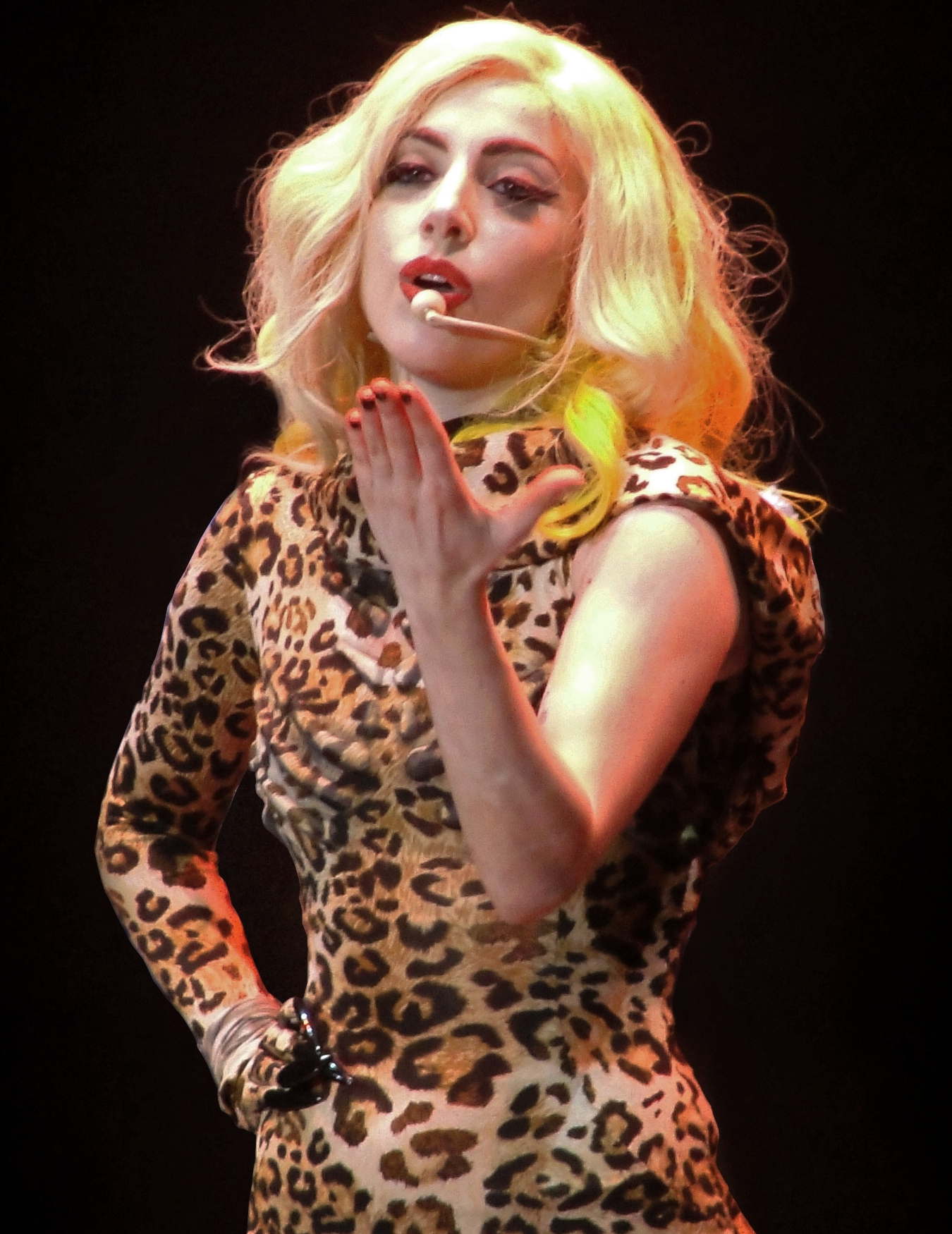
2010 award winner and three-time nominee, Lady Gaga

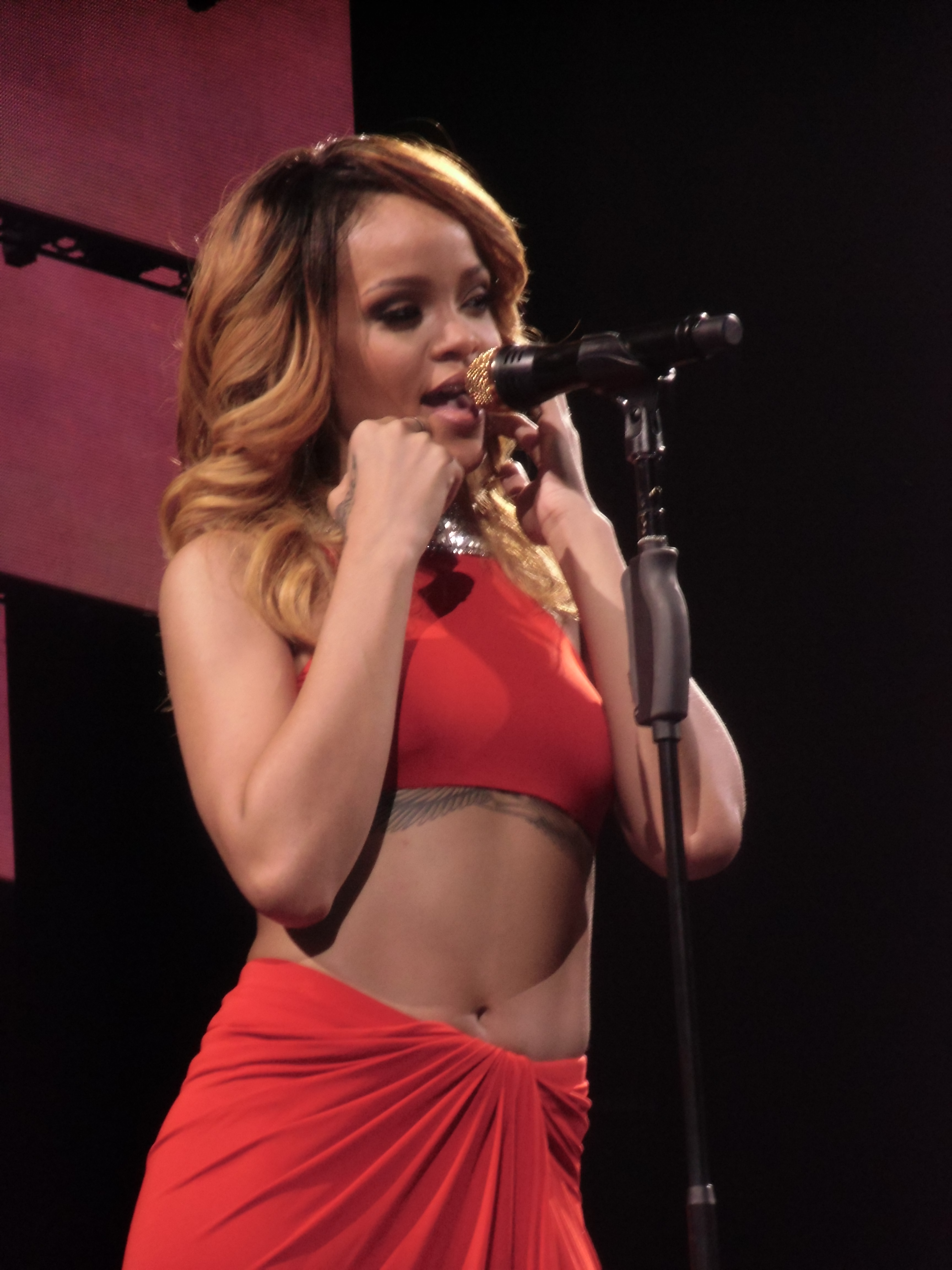
2011 award winner, Rihanna

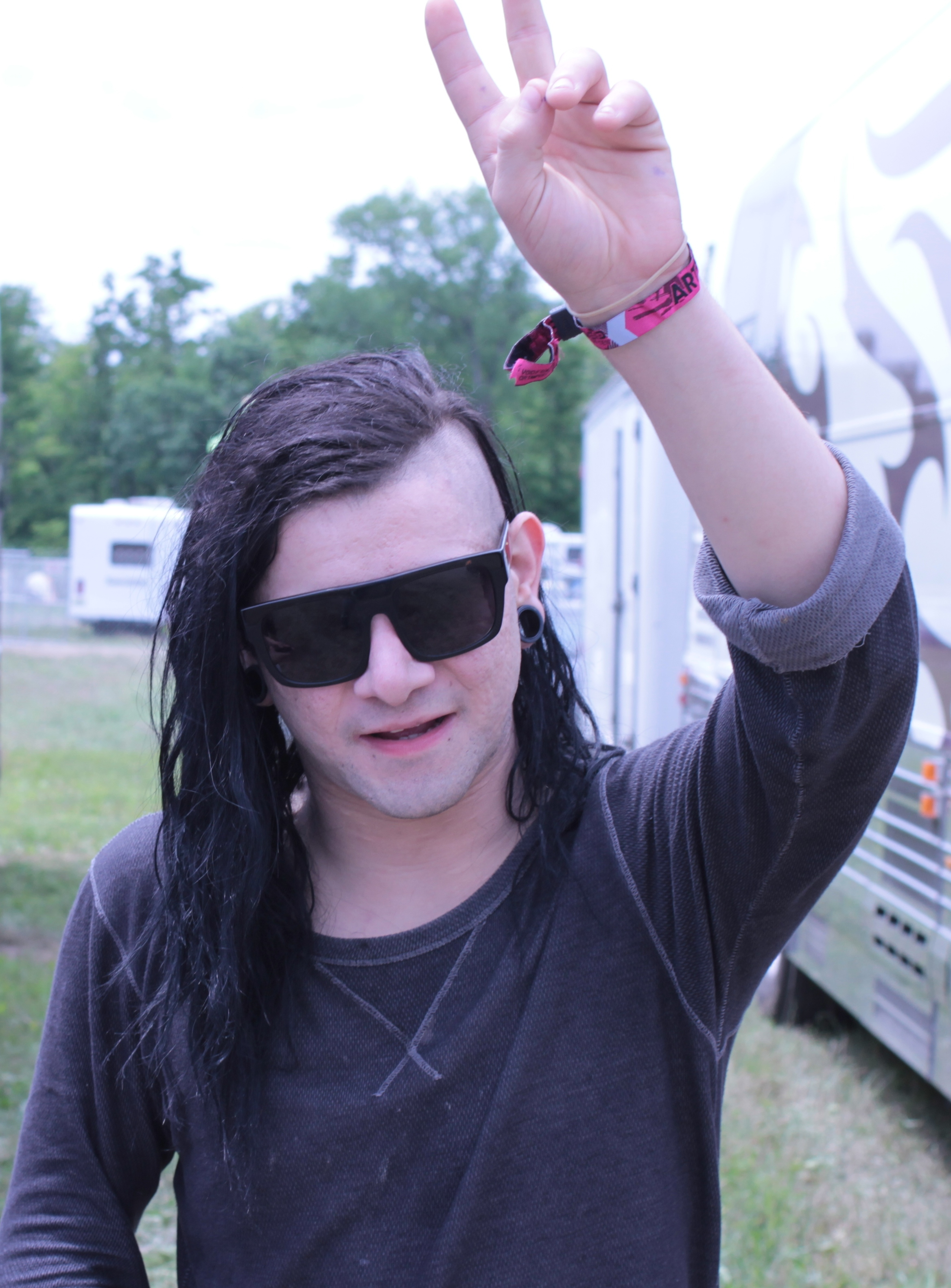
Four-time award winner, Skrillex

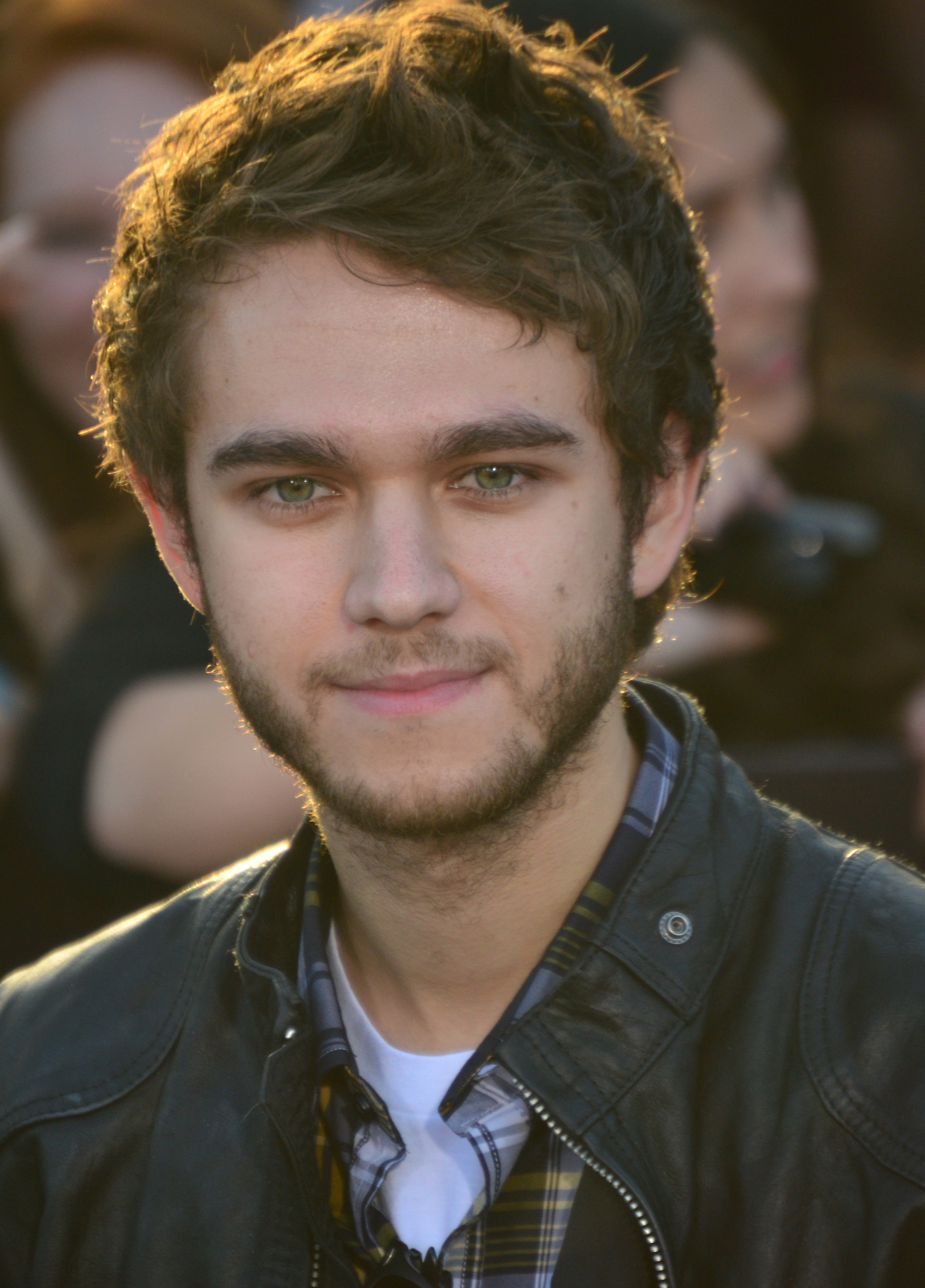
2014 award winner, Zedd

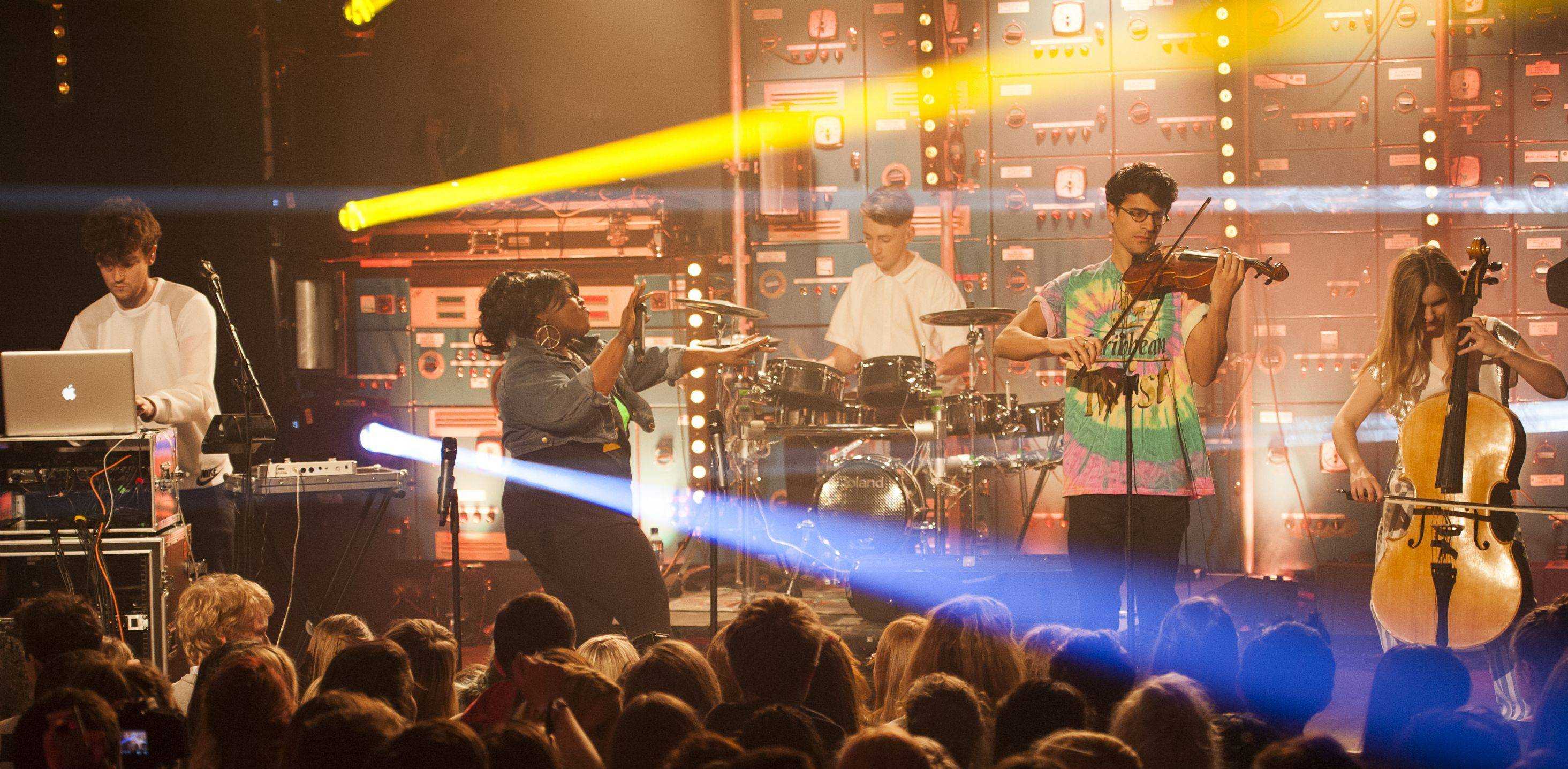
2015 award winner, Clean Bandit.

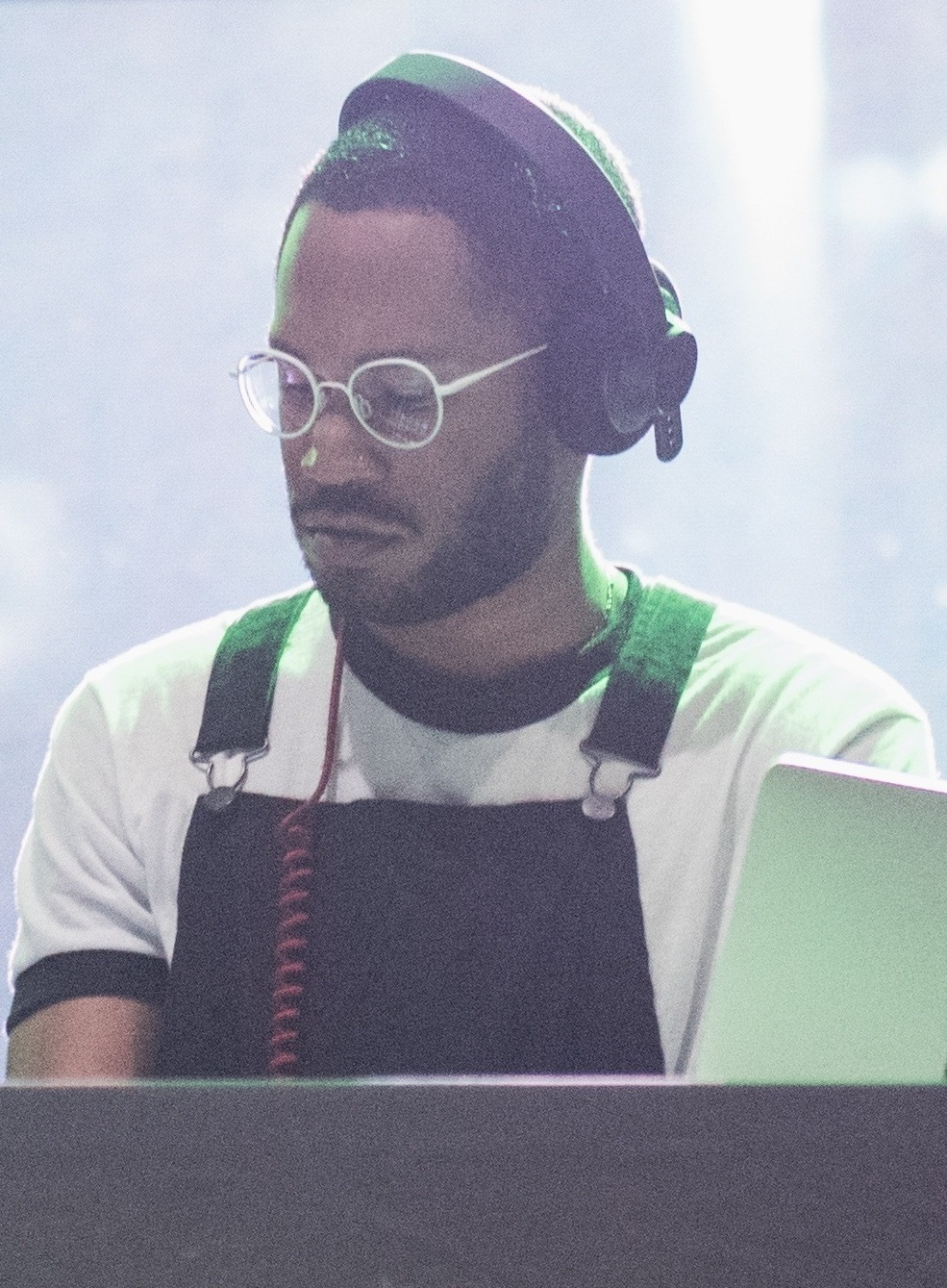
2021 award winner, Kaytranada.

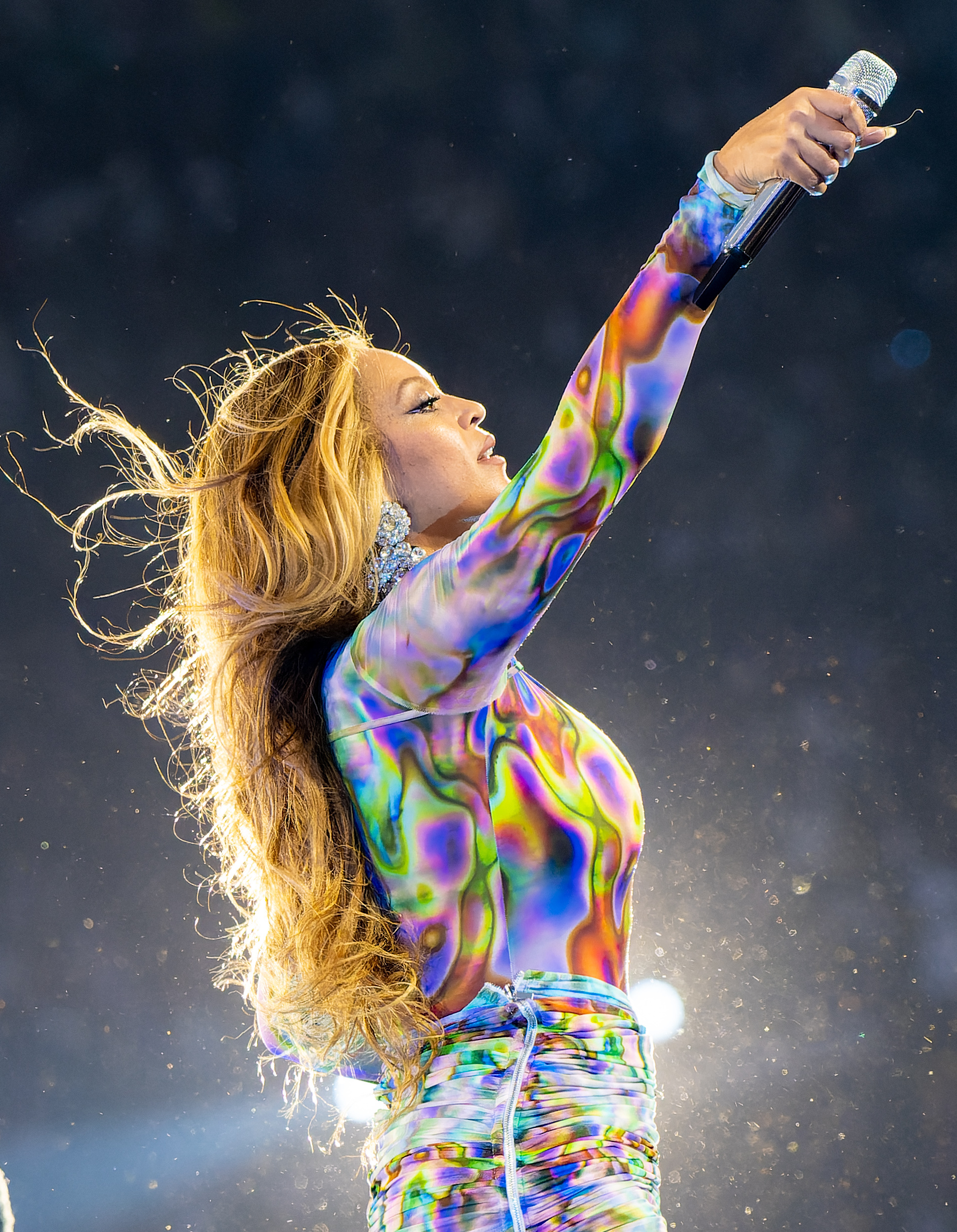
2023 award winner, Beyoncé.

=== 1990s ===
Year^{[I]}	Artist(s)	Work
1998
1998	Donna Summer and Giorgio Moroder	"Carry On"
1998	Daft Punk	"Da Funk"
1998	Gina G	"Ooh Aah... Just a Little Bit"
1998	Pet Shop Boys	"To Step Aside"
1998	Quad City DJ's	"Space Jam"
1999
1999	Madonna	"Ray of Light"
1999	Boy George	"When Will You Learn"
1999	Daft Punk	"Around the World"
1999	Gloria Estefan	"Heaven's What I Feel"
1999	Cyndi Lauper	"Disco Inferno"

=== 2000s ===
Year^{[I]}	Artist(s)	Work	Production team
2000
2000	Cher	"Believe"	—N/a
2000	Gloria Estefan	"Don't Let This Moment End"	—N/a
2000	Fatboy Slim	"Praise You"	—N/a
2000	Jennifer Lopez	"Waiting for Tonight"	—N/a
2000	Donna Summer	"I Will Go with You (Con te partirò)"	—N/a
2001
2001	Baha Men	"Who Let the Dogs Out?"	—N/a
2001	Eiffel 65	"Blue (Da Ba Dee)"	—N/a
2001	Enrique Iglesias	"Be with You"	—N/a
2001	Jennifer Lopez	"Let's Get Loud"	—N/a
2001	Moby	"Natural Blues"	—N/a
2002
2002	Janet Jackson	"All for You"	Janet Jackson, Jimmy Jam and Terry Lewis, producers; Steve Hodge, mixer
2002	Daft Punk and Romanthony	"One More Time"	Daft Punk, producers
2002	Depeche Mode	"I Feel Loved"	Mark Bell, producer; Steve Fitzmaurice, mixer
2002	Gloria Estefan	"Out of Nowhere"	Randy Barlow and Emilio Estefan Jr., producers; Gustavo Celis, mixer
2002	Lionel Richie	"Angel"	Brian Rawling and Mark Taylor, producers; Mark Taylor, mixer
2003
2003	Dirty Vegas	"Days Go By"	Ben Harris, Paul Harris and Steve Smith, producers
2003	Daniel Bedingfield	"Gotta Get Thru This"	Daniel Bedingfield, Andy Colver, Arthur Smith and Dean Wilson, producers; Andy Colver, Arthur Smith and Dean Wilson, mixers
2003	Groove Armada	"Superstylin'"	Groove Armada, producers; Dave Pemberton, mixer
2003	Kylie Minogue	"Love at First Sight"	Julian Gallagher and Richard Stannard, producers; Ash Howes, mixer
2003	No Doubt	"Hella Good"	Nellee Hooper and No Doubt, producers; Mark Stent, mixer
2004
2004	Kylie Minogue	"Come into My World"	Rob Davis and Cathy Dennis, producers; Rob Davis, Cathy Dennis, Bruce Elliott-Smith and Phil Larsen, mixers
2004	Cher	"Love One Another"	Chris Cox, Rick Nowels and Wayne Rodrigues, producers; Manny Marroquin, mixer
2004	Groove Armada	"Easy"	Groove Armada, producers/mixers
2004	Madonna	"Die Another Day"	Mirwais Ahmadzai and Madonna, producers; Mark Stent, mixer
2004	Télépopmusik	"Breathe"	Fabrice Dumont, Stephan Haeri and Christophe Hetier, producers; Stephan Haeri, mixer
2005
2005	Britney Spears	"Toxic"	Bloodshy & Avant, producers; Niklas Flyckt, mixer
2005	Basement Jaxx and Lisa Kekaula	"Good Luck"	Basement Jaxx, producers/mixers
2005	The Chemical Brothers	"Get Yourself High"	The Chemical Brothers, producers/mixers
2005	Kylie Minogue	"Slow"	Dan Carey and Emiliana Torrini, producers; Mr. Dan, mixer
2005	Scissor Sisters	"Comfortably Numb"	Scissor Sisters, producers/mixers
2006
2006	The Chemical Brothers and Q-Tip	"Galvanize"	The Chemical Brothers, producer; Steve Dub and The Chemical Brothers, mixers
2006	Deep Dish	"Say Hello"	Ali "Dubfire" Shirazinia and Sharam Tayebi, producers; Deep Dish and Matt Nordstrom, mixers
2006	Fatboy Slim and Lateef	"Wonderful Night"	Fatboy Slim, producer; Simon Thornton, mixer
2006	LCD Soundsystem	"Daft Punk Is Playing at My House"	The DFA, producers; James Murphy and Andy Wallace, mixers
2006	Kylie Minogue	"I Believe in You"	Babydaddy and Jake Shears, producers; Jeremy Wheatley, mixer
2006	New Order	"Guilt Is a Useless Emotion"	Jacques Lu Cont and New Order, producers/mixers
2007
2007	Justin Timberlake featuring Timbaland	"SexyBack"	Nate (Danja) Hills, Timbaland and Justin Timberlake, producers; Jimmy Douglass, mixer
2007	Depeche Mode	"Suffer Well"	Ben Hillier, producer; Steve Fitzmaurice and Ben Hillier, mixers
2007	Goldfrapp	"Ooh La La"	Goldfrapp, producers; Mark Stent, mixer
2007	Madonna	"Get Together"	Jacques Lu Cont and Madonna, producers; Mark Stent, mixer
2007	Pet Shop Boys	"I'm with Stupid"	Trevor Horn, producer; Robert Orton, mixer
2008
2008	Justin Timberlake	"LoveStoned/I Think She Knows"	Nate (Danja) Hills, Tim Mosley and Justin Timberlake, producers; Jimmy Douglass and Tim Mosley, mixers
2008	The Chemical Brothers	"Do It Again"	Tom Rowlands and Ed Simons, producers/mixers
2008	Justice	"D.A.N.C.E."	Gaspard Augé and Xavier de Rosnay, producers/mixers
2008	Mika	"Love Today"	Jodi Marr, John Merchant, Mika and Greg Wells, producers; Greg Wells, mixer
2008	Rihanna	"Don't Stop the Music"	Stargate, producers; Philip Tan, mixer
2009
2009	Daft Punk	"Harder, Better, Faster, Stronger (Alive 2007)"	Thomas Bangalter and Guy-Manuel de Homem-Christo, producers/mixers
2009	Hot Chip	"Ready for the Floor"	Hot Chip, producers; Dan Carey, mixer
2009	Lady Gaga and Colby O'Donis	"Just Dance"	RedOne, producer; Robert Orton, mixer
2009	Madonna	"Give It 2 Me"	Madonna and The Neptunes, producers; Andrew Coleman and Spike Stent, mixers
2009	Rihanna	"Disturbia"	Brian Kennedy, producer; Philip Tan, mixer
2009	Sam Sparro	"Black and Gold"	Jesse Rogg and Sam Sparro, producers; Jeremy Wheatley, mixer

=== 2010s ===
Year^{[I]}	Artist(s)	Work	Production team
2010
2010	Lady Gaga	"Poker Face"	RedOne, producer; Robert Orton, RedOne and Dave Russell, mixers
2010	David Guetta and Kelly Rowland	"When Love Takes Over"	David Guetta and Frederic Riesterer, producers; Veronica Ferraro, mixer
2010	Madonna	"Celebration"	Madonna and Paul Oakenfold, producers; Demacio Castellon, mixer
2010	Britney Spears	"Womanizer"	Nikeshia Briscoe, producer; Serban Ghenea, mixer
2010	The Black Eyed Peas	"Boom Boom Pow"	Will Adams, Jean Baptiste and Poet Name Life, producers; Dylan Dresdow, mixer
2011
2011	Rihanna	"Only Girl (In the World)"	Kuk Harrell, Stargate and Sandy Vee, producers; Philip Tan and Sandy Vee, mixers
2011	Goldfrapp	"Rocket"	Alison Goldfrapp and Will Gregory, producers; Mark Stent, mixer
2011	La Roux	"In for the Kill"	Elly Jackson and Ben Langmaid, producers; Serban Ghenea and John Hanes, mixers
2011	Lady Gaga	"Dance in the Dark"	Fernando Garibay and Lady Gaga, producers; Robert Orton, mixer
2011	Robyn	"Dancing on My Own"	Patrik Berger and Robyn, producers; Niklas Flyckt, mixer
2012
2012	Skrillex	"Scary Monsters and Nice Sprites"	Skrillex, producer/mixer
2012	Deadmau5 and Greta Svabo Bech	"Raise Your Weapon"	Deadmau5, producer
2012	Duck Sauce	"Barbra Streisand"	Duck Sauce, producers; A-Trak and Armand van Helden, mixers
2012	David Guetta and Avicii	"Sunshine"	Avicii, David Guetta and Giorgio Tuinfort, producers; Avicii, mixer
2012	Robyn	"Call Your Girlfriend"	Klas Åhlund and Mathieu Jomphe, producers; Niklas Flyckt, mixer
2012	Swedish House Mafia	"Save the World"	Steve Angello, Axel Hedfors and Sebastian Ingrosso, producers/mixers
2013
2013	Skrillex and Sirah	"Bangarang"	Skrillex, producer/mixer
2013	Avicii	"Levels"	Tim Bergling and Ash Pournouri, producers; Tim Bergling, mixer
2013	Calvin Harris featuring Ne-Yo	"Let's Go"	Calvin Harris, producer/mixer
2013	Swedish House Mafia featuring John Martin	"Don't You Worry Child"	Steve Angello, Axel Hedfors and Sebastian Ingrosso, producers/mixers
2013	Al Walser	"I Can't Live Without You"	Al Walser, producer/mixer
2014
2014	Zedd featuring Foxes	"Clarity"	Zedd, producer/mixer
2014	Duke Dumont featuring A*M*E and MNEK	"Need U (100%)"	Adam Dyment and Tommy Forrest, producers/mixers
2014	Calvin Harris featuring Florence Welch	"Sweet Nothing"	Calvin Harris, producer/mixer
2014	Kaskade	"Atmosphere"	Finn Bjarnson and Ryan Raddon, producers; Ryan Raddon, mixer
2014	Armin Van Buuren featuring Trevor Guthrie	"This Is What It Feels Like"	Benno de Goeij and Armin Van Buuren, producer/mixer
2015
2015	Clean Bandit featuring Jess Glynne	"Rather Be"	Grace Chatto and Jack Patterson, producers; Wez Clarke and Jack Patterson, mixers
2015	Basement Jaxx	"Never Say Never"	Basement Jaxx, producers; Basement Jaxx, Duncan F. Brown and Alex Evans, mixers
2015	Disclosure featuring Mary J. Blige	"F for You"	Disclosure, producer/mixer
2015	Duke Dumont featuring Jax Jones	"I Got U"	Duke Dumont and Jax Jones, producers; Tommy Forrest, mixer
2015	Zhu	"Faded"	Zhu, producer/mixer
2016
2016	Jack Ü with Justin Bieber	"Where Are Ü Now"	Sonny Moore and Thomas Pentz, producers/mixers
2016	Above & Beyond featuring Zoë Johnston	"We Are All We Need"	Andrew Bayer, Jono Grant, Tony McGuinness and Paavo Siljamäki, producers; Jono Grant, Tony McGuinness and Paavo Siljamäki, mixers
2016	The Chemical Brothers	"Go"	Tom Rowlands and Ed Simons, producers; Steve Dub Jones and Tom Rowlands, mixers
2016	Flying Lotus featuring Kendrick Lamar	"Never Catch Me"	Steven Ellison, producer; Kevin Marques Moo, mixer
2016	Galantis	"Runaway (U & I)"	Linus Eklöw, Christian Karlsson and Svidden, producers; Linus Eklöw, Niklas Flyckt and Christian Karlsson, mixers
2017
2017	The Chainsmokers featuring Daya	"Don't Let Me Down"	The Chainsmokers, producers; Jordan "DJ Swivel" Young, mixer
2017	Bob Moses	"Tearing Me Up"	Bob Moses, producers; Mark 'Spike' Stent, mixer
2017	Flume featuring Kai	"Never Be like You"	Harley Streten, producer; Eric J Dubowsky, mixer
2017	Riton featuring Kah-Lo	"Rinse & Repeat"	Riton, producer; Wez Clarke, mixer
2017	Sofi Tukker	"Drinkee"	Sofi Tukker, producers; Bryan Wilson, mixer
2018
2018	LCD Soundsystem	"Tonite"	James Murphy, producer/mixer
2018	Bonobo	"Bambro Koyo Ganda"	Bonobo, producer/mixer
2018	CamelPhat and Elderbrook	"Cola"	CamelPhat and Elderbrook, producers; CamelPhat, mixer
2018	Gorillaz featuring DRAM	"Andromeda"	Damon Albarn, Jamie Hewlett, Remi Kabaka and Anthony Khan, producers; Stephen Sedgwick, mixer
2018	Odesza	"Line of Sight"	Clayton Knight and Harrison Mills, producers; Eric J Dubowsky, mixer
2019
2019	Silk City and Dua Lipa featuring Diplo and Mark Ronson	"Electricity"	Jarami, Alex Metric, Riton and Silk City, producers; Josh Gudwin, mixer
2019	Above & Beyond featuring Richard Bedford	"Northern Soul"	Above & Beyond and Andrew Bayer, producers; Above & Beyond, mixers
2019	Disclosure featuring Fatoumata Diawara	"Ultimatum"	Guy Lawrence and Howard Lawrence, producers; Guy Lawrence, mixer
2019	Fisher	"Losing It"	Paul Nicholas Fisher, producer; Kevin Grainger, mixer
2019	Virtual Self	"Ghost Voices"	Porter Robinson, producer/mixer

=== 2020s ===
Year^{[I]}	Artist(s)	Work	Production team
2020
2020	The Chemical Brothers	"Got to Keep On"	The Chemical Brothers, producers; Steve Dub Jones and Tom Rowlands, mixers
2020	Bonobo	"Linked"	Simon Green, producer; Simon Green and Frank Merritt, mixers
2020	Meduza featuring Goodboys	"Piece of Your Heart"	Simone Giani, Luca De Gregorio and Mattia Vitale, producers/mixers
2020	Rüfüs Du Sol	"Underwater"	Jason Evigan and Rüfüs Du Sol, producers; Cassian Stewart-Kasimba, mixer
2020	Skrillex and Boys Noize featuring Ty Dolla Sign	"Midnight Hour"	Boys Noize and Skrillex, producers; Tom Norris and Skrillex, mixers
2021
2021	Kaytranada featuring Kali Uchis	"10%"	Kaytranada, producer; Neal H Pogue, mixer
2021	Diplo and Sidepiece	"On My Mind"	Diplo and Sidepiece, producers; Luca Pretolesi, mixer
2021	Disclosure featuring Aminé and Slowthai	"My High"	Guy Lawrence and Howard Lawrence, producers; Guy Lawrence, mixer
2021	Flume featuring Toro y Moi	"The Difference"	Flume, producer; Eric J Dubowsky, mixer
2021	Jayda G	"Both of Us"	Fred Again and Jayda G, producers/mixers
2022
2022	Rüfüs du Sol	"Alive"	Jason Evigan, producer; Cassian, mixer
2022	Afrojack and David Guetta	"Hero"	Afrojack, David Guetta, Kuk Harrell and Stargate, producers; Elio Debets, mixer
2022	Ólafur Arnalds featuring Bonobo	"Loom"	Ólafur Arnalds and Simon Green, producers; Ólafur Arnalds, mixer
2022	James Blake	"Before"	James Blake and Dominic Maker, producers; James Blake, mixer
2022	Bonobo and Totally Enormous Extinct Dinosaurs	"Heartbreak"	Simon Green and Orlando Higginbottom, producers/mixers
2022	Caribou	"You Can Do It"	Dan Snaith, producer; David Wrench, mixer
2022	Tiësto	"The Business"	Hightower, Julia Karlsson and Tiësto, producers; Tiësto, mixer
2023
2023	Beyoncé	"Break My Soul"	Beyoncé, Terius "The-Dream" Gesteelde-Diamant, Jens Christian Isaksen and Christopher "Tricky" Stewart producers; Stuart White, mixer
2023	Bonobo	"Rosewood"	Simon Green, producer/mixer
2023	Diplo and Miguel	"Don't Forget My Love"	Diplo and Maximilian Jaeger, producers; Luca Pretolesi, mixer
2023	David Guetta and Bebe Rexha	"I'm Good (Blue)"	David Guetta and Timofey Reznikov, producers; Serban Ghenea, mixer
2023	Kaytranada featuring H.E.R.	"Intimidated"	H.E.R. and Kaytranada, producers; Kaytranada, mixer
2023	Rüfüs Du Sol	"On My Knees"	Jason Evigan and Rüfüs Du Sol, producers; Cassian Stewart-Kasimba, mixer
2024
2024	Skrillex, Fred Again and Flowdan	"Rumble"	BEAM, Elley Duhé, Fred Again and Skrillex, producers; Skrillex, mixer
2024	Aphex Twin	"Blackbox Life Recorder 21f"	Richard D. James, producer/mixer
2024	James Blake	"Loading"	James Blake and Dominic Maker, producers; James Blake, mixer
2024	Disclosure	"Higher Than Ever Before"	Cirkut, Guy Lawrence and Howard Lawrence, producers; Guy Lawrence, mixer
2024	Romy and Fred Again	"Strong"	Fred Again, Stuart Price and Romy, producers; Fred Again and Stuart Price, mixers
2025
2025	Justice and Tame Impala	"Neverender"	Gaspard Augé and Xavier de Rosnay, producers; Gaspard Augé, Xavier de Rosnay, Damien Quintard and Vincent Taurelle, mixers
2025	Disclosure	"She's Gone, Dance On"	Guy Lawrence and Howard Lawrence, producers; Guy Lawrence, mixer
2025	Four Tet	"Loved"	Kieran Hebden, producer/mixer
2025	Fred Again and Baby Keem	"Leavemealone"	Boo, Fred Again, Alex Gibson, Kieran Hebden, Loose, Skrillex and Sid Stone, producers; Fred Again and Jay Reynolds, mixers
2025	Kaytranada and Childish Gambino	"Witchy"	Lauren D'Elia and Kaytranada, producers; Neal H Pogue, mixer
2026
2026	Tame Impala	"End of Summer"	Kevin Parker, producer/mixer
2026	Disclosure and Anderson .Paak	"No Cap"	Guy Lawrence and Howard Lawrence, producers; Guy Lawrence, mixer
2026	Fred Again, Skepta and PlaqueBoyMax	"Victory Lap"	Blake Cascoe, Berwyn Du Bois, Fred Again, Darcy Lewis, Dan Mayo and PlaqueBoyMax, producers; Tom Norris, mixer
2026	Kaytranada	"Space Invader"	Kaytranada, producer/mixer
2026	Skrillex	"Voltage"	John Feldmann and Skrillex, producers; Robert Guzman, Luca Pretolesi, Skrillex, Drew Gold and Virtual Riot, mixers
2027	Fred Again and Jamie T	"Lights Burn Dimmer"	Fred Again, producer; Tom Norris, mixer
2027	Madonna	"I Feel So Free"	Madonna and Stuart Price, producers; Stuart Price, mixer
2027	Slayyyter	"Crank"	Wyatt Bernard and Austin Corona, producers; Clint Gibbs, mixer
2027	Tame Impala	"My Old Ways"	Kevin Parker, producer/mixer
2027	Tinashe	"Melatonin"	Nightfeelings, Ricky Reed and Zack Sekoff, producers; Tom Norris, mixer
2027	Underscores	"Music"	Underscores, producer/mixer

^{^[I]} Each year is linked to the article about the Grammy Awards held that year.

== Artists with multiple wins ==
4 wins

- Skrillex

2 wins

- Diplo
- Justin Timberlake
- Tame Impala
- The Chemical Brothers

== Artists with multiple nominations ==
6 nominations

- Disclosure
- Madonna
- Skrillex

5 nominations

- Bonobo
- The Chemical Brothers
- Fred Again

4 nominations

- Daft Punk
- Diplo
- David Guetta
- Kaytranada
- Kylie Minogue

3 nominations

- Gloria Estefan
- Lady Gaga
- Rihanna
- Rüfüs Du Sol
- Tame Impala

2 nominations

- Above & Beyond
- Avicii
- Basement Jaxx
- Britney Spears
- Calvin Harris
- Cher
- Depeche Mode
- Donna Summer
- Duke Dumont
- Fatboy Slim
- Flume
- Goldfrapp
- Groove Armada
- James Blake
- Jennifer Lopez
- Justice
- Justin Timberlake
- LCD Soundsystem
- Pet Shop Boys
- Robyn
- Swedish House Mafia

== See also ==
- Dance Music Hall of Fame
