= Can't Live Without You =

Can't Live Without You or I Can't Live Without You may refer to:

- "Can't Live Without You", a track from Mobile Orchestra, an album by American electronica project Owl City
- "Can't Live Without You", a track from Blackout (Scorpions album)
- "I Can't Live Without You", a song by Al Walser
- "I Can't Live Without You", a track from World Domination (Band-Maid album)
- Without You (Badfinger song)
- Tere Bina Kya Jeena (transl. Can't Live Without You), a 1989 Indian Hindi-language film
