= Jamaica (band) =

French music duo

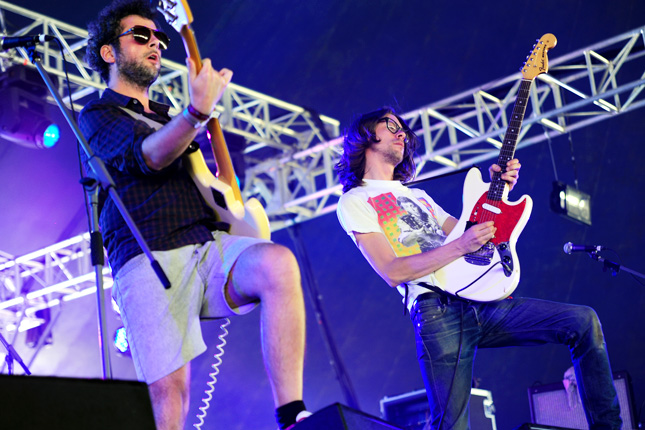
- Jamaica in 2011

Background information
- Origin: Paris, France
- Genres: French house; electro house; electronic rock; electroclash; nu-disco; alternative dance
- Years active: 2005–2014
- Labels: Institubes; Perspex Recordings; Arcade Mode; Cooperative Music
- Members: Antoine Hilaire; Florent Lyonnet; David Aknin

Jamaica, formerly Poney Poney, is a French electronic rock band. The group has not given any sign of activity since 2014.

== History ==
The group, first called Poney Poney, was initially a solo project by Parisian graphic designer Antoine Hilaire. The name of the group is given in homage to a short-lived group called Bunny Bunny. He then had a group with Camille Clerc and Gaspard Augé. He was joined in 2005 by Samuel Nicolas on drums and Florent Lyonnet on bass, originally from Aix-en-Provence, son of a hairdresser and a bricklayer father, who grew up partly in Algeria before move in with Guillaume from the Chateau Marmont group then with Nubia Esteban, the daughter of Lio.

Poney Poney recorded several titles including AM Music and By the Numbers with the help of Xavier de Rosnay, from the French electro group Justice. The single Cross the Fader is the result of a collaboration with Xavier de Rosnay and the support of the English label Perspex Recordings. The single When Do You Wanna Stop Working is produced with Para One, and released on the Institubes label, via its Unsunned division.

Jamaica is the name taken by the duo composed of Antoine Hilaire and Florent Lyonnet after the departure of Samuel Nicolas. In 2010, they released two music videos: I Think I Like U2 (directed by So Me and Machine molle), as well as Short and Entertaining (directed by Martial Schmetz and Jeremie Rozan). They also announce that the recording of their first album is finished, produced in collaboration with Xavier de Rosnay and Peter Franco. They appeared at La Cigale on June 3, 2010, as the opening act for Two Door Cinema Club and began a world tour of more than 150 concerts.

Their first album No Problem was released in France on August 23, 2010, and their first Parisian headlining concert took place on February 8, 2011, at the Alhambra. Les Inrockuptibles say of the album: "We come across bits of classic, little bits of electro, friendly beats, refrains to put your arm on the door, with your head moving in rhythm, Beavis and Butt-Head style».

Antoine Hilaire makes an appearance in the movie Memory Lane, released on November 24, 2010. Their song I Think I Like U 2 is used for the promotion of Renault vehicles in 2011 and the title By the Numbers is part of the soundtrack of the NBA game 2K12. In 2012, Jamaica recorded their second album in Los Angeles with Peter Franco producing. Antoine Hilaire is also part of the group Tahiti Boy and the Palmtree Family. After composing Je danse pour Jenifer, Florent joined Lio in January 2012 as assistant coach on The Voice Belgique8.

On December 9, 2013, the band announced their comeback with a video trailer released on YouTube. Their second album, Ventura, recorded between Paris and Los Angeles, was released in March 2014. From then on, Florent had a child with Marion Motin, the group gave no further sign of activity.

== Discography ==
=== Albums ===
- 2010 : No problem
- 2014 : Ventura

=== Singles ===
- 2010 : I Think I Like U 2
- 2010 : Short and Entertaining
- 2011 : Jericho
- 2014 : Two on Two

=== Remixes ===
- 2010 : Tahiti Boy and the Palmtree Family - Blood in your Eyes (Jamaica Remix)
- 2010 : Hurts - Better than Love (Jamaica Remix)
