= Ethan Cohn =

American actor (born 1979)

- Born: April 18, 1979 (age 46); New York City, New York, U.S.
- Occupation: Actor

Ethan Cohn (born April 18, 1979) is an American actor.

== Career ==
Cohn starred in the films Cry Wolf, Rubber, The Experiment, and Lady in the Water.

He portrays Owen Kellogg in Atlas Shrugged (2011), the film adaptation of Ayn Rand's novel of the same name.

Most recently, he played a cranky birdwatcher in the film A Birder's Guide to Everything, which has been picked up by Focus World.

He is best known for his role as Zane Taylor in science fiction serial drama television series Heroes. Cohn has worked in many television series, having small roles in CSI: Miami, Head Cases and Huff. However, he advanced rapidly in his career and had a recurrent role in Gilmore Girls as Glenn.

Along with playwright and journalist Elizabeth Savage, Cohn has written comedy television pilots and feature films.

== Filmography ==
=== Film ===
Year	Title	Role	Notes
2005	Cry Wolf	Graham	
2006	Art School Confidential	Art Dork #2	Uncredited
2006	Lady in the Water	Glasses Smoker	
2007	The Gene Generation	Mouse	
2007	On the Doll	Brian	
2010	Alice in Wonderland	Man with Large Chin in Red Queen Court	
2010	Rubber	Film Buff Ethan	
2010	The Experiment	Benjy	
2011	Atlas Shrugged: Part I	Owen Kellogg	
2011	Language of a Broken Heart	Cubbie	
2012	The Amazing Spider-Man	Lab Technician	Uncredited
2013	A Birder's Guide to Everything	Jeff	
2014	Beautiful Girl	Garth	
2018	Another Time	Security Guard	
2018	The Con Is On	Cameron	
2020	Wander Darkly	Kevin	
2022	Blonde	Assistant to the Director	

=== Television ===
Year	Title	Role	Notes
2003–2005	Gilmore Girls	Glenn Babble / Josh	12 episodes
2004	Huff	Cal	Episode: "Is She Dead?"
2005	CSI: Miami	Todd Simmons	Episode: Game Over"
2005	Head Cases	Spencer	Episode: "S(elf) Help"
2006	Campus Ladies	Theater Manager	Episode: "The Blind Leading the Blonde"
2007	Heroes	Zane Taylor	Episode: "Run!"
2008	Greek	Clerk	Episode: "Barely Legal"
2009	Monk	Kyle Larkin	Episode: "Mr. Monk and the UFO"
2010	United States of Tara	Dark Nihilist	Episode: "Explosive Diorama"
2014	Castle	Milo Pavlik	Episode: "Under Fire"
2014	Intelligence	Danny	Episode: "The Grey Hat"
2016	Bajillion Dollar Propertie$	Ted	Episode: "Make Partner Part 2"
2016	Rizzoli & Isles	Derek	Episode: "Post Mortem"
2018	Roseanne	Nick	Episode: "No Country for Old Women"
2019	The Morning Show	Jared	Episode: "Lonely at the Top"
