= Al Walser =

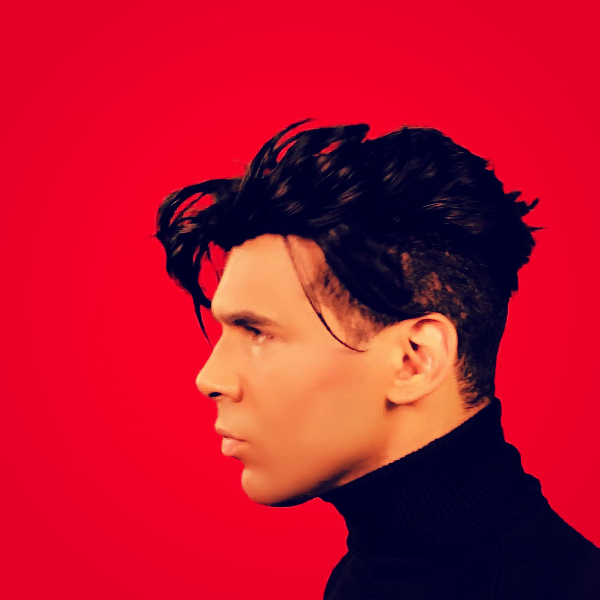

Background information
- Born: Lausanne, Switzerland
- Origin: Liechtenstein
- Genres: Rock'n'roll, dance
- Occupations: Singer, songwriter, record producer, DJ
- Years active: 2004–present
- Label: Cut the Bull Entertainment
- Formerly of: Fun Factory
- Website: alwalser.com

Al Walser is a Liechtensteiner singer, songwriter, and record producer based in Los Angeles. Walser first gained fame as a member of German Eurodance group Fun Factory with whom he toured worldwide. His 2012 single "I Can't Live Without You" was nominated for a Grammy Award in the field of Best Dance Recording. Walser won The New York International Independent Film and Video Festival Award for Best Music Video for his single "I Want My Money Now" in 2014. He won the Grammy Award for Best Children's Music Album in 2020.

== Biography ==
Walser was born in Lausanne, Switzerland to a Liechtensteiner mother and an African father. He later became a radio personality in Liechtenstein at Radio Liechtenstein, then toured worldwide as a DJ. Following his work on radio, Walser was asked to join German Eurodance group Fun Factory following the departure of member Toni Cottura.

Walser later wrote the book Musicians Make It Big: An Insider Reveals the Secret Path to Break in Today's Music Industry and founded the record label Cut the Bull Entertainment, based in Hollywood. He's the producer and host of the weekly syndicated US TOP 20 Show and is the former host of the weekly syndicated radio show Al Walser's Weekly Top 20.

In 2008, his debut album Heart Breaker was released. Walser released the single "Living Your Dream" in collaboration with American singer Jermaine Jackson in 2009. He released the song "I Can't Live Without You" in August 2012, and it was later controversially nominated for Best Dance Recording at the 55th Grammy Awards. In 2015 he released his solo album "Al Walser Comes 2 Life!", which featured a development in his style, as it attempted to incorporate reggae, disco, and drum and bass into electronic dance music.

In an Interview with Spin, Al Walser talks about his music and career after the 2013 Grammy Awards. He talks about his relationship with God and how his spirituality guides his career. Walser says "God is really my manager and my guidance." Al Walser released a new single and music video called "O.C.D." on August 1, 2014. Alan Cross reviewed the song on his website, A Journal of Musical Things! Cross says he likes the song and "I confess to never having heard of Al Walser before, but given my industrial/metal predilections, I’m going to have to give the guy a closer look."

=== Controversy ===
Walser's Grammy nomination for "I Can't Live Without You" attracted much attention due to his low profile compared to his fellow nominees. Several prominent dance musicians reacted negatively to the nomination, with German musician Zedd alleging that Walser had used elements of his song "Spectrum" in one of Walser's remixes without permission. Several media outlets speculated that Walser's membership in the National Academy of Recording Arts and Sciences and position as a Grammy voter may have had a role in his nomination. Walser rejected the claims and instead attributed his nomination to "great music" and "drive". In an interview with FUSE TV, Walser attempted to explain the shock wave reactions he caused to the music establishment by saying "Some people pay money under the table or exchange sexual favors; and I came in clean!" Amid the negative attention, there were also media outlets that liked Al Walser and his rebellious style. Billboard's Zel McCarthy wrote "His attitude reflects a unique understanding of the music business at large."

== Discography ==
=== Studio albums ===
List of studio albums
Title	Album details
Heart Breaker	Released: September 8, 2008; Label: Blisstunes; Formats: CD, digital download
Al Walser Comes 2 Life!	Released: August 21, 2015; Label: Cut The Bull Ent.; Formats: CD, digital download

=== Singles ===
List of singles, showing year released and album name
Title	Year	Album
"Living Your Dream" (with Jermaine Jackson)	2009	Non-album singles
"I Can't Live Without You" (with Olga Levit)	2012	Non-album singles
