= Language of a Broken Heart =

- Directed by: Rocky Powell
- Written by: Juddy Talt
- Produced by: Rocky Powell; Juddy Talt
- Starring: Juddy Talt
- Cinematography: Steve Corie
- Production company: Bridgman Rock Films
- Release date: March 8, 2013 (South by Southwest)
- Running time: 98 minutes
- Country: United States
- Language: English

Language of a Broken Heart is a 2013 American romantic comedy film directed by Rocky Powell and written by and starring Juddy Talt.

== Cast ==
- Juddy Talt
- Lara Pulver
- Ethan Cohn
- Kate French
- Julie White
- Oscar Nunez

== Reception ==
The film has a 36% rating on Rotten Tomatoes. Drew Hunt of Slant Magazine awarded the film half a star out of four.

The Fort Worth Star-Telegram gave the film a negative review and wrote, "Take 500 Days of Summer and Garden State, strip away their charms and you end up with Language of a Broken Heart, a handsomely shot but tired pile-up of indie rom-com cliches."
