= Rubber (2010 film) =

Film by Quentin Dupieux

- French release poster
- Directed by: Quentin Dupieux
- Written by: Quentin Dupieux
- Produced by: Gregory Bernard; Julien Berlan; Kevos Van Der Meiren
- Starring: Stephen Spinella; Roxane Mesquida; Jack Plotnick; Haley Ramm; Wings Hauser; Ethan Cohn
- Cinematography: Quentin Dupieux
- Edited by: Quentin Dupieux
- Music by: Gaspard Augé; Mr. Oizo
- Production companies: Realitism Films; Canal+ Arte
- Distributed by: UFO Distribution
- Release dates: 15 May 2010 (Cannes); 10 November 2010 (France)
- Running time: 82 minutes
- Country: France
- Language: English
- Budget: $800,000
- Box office: $680,914

Rubber is a 2010 English-language French independent absurdist horror comedy film written and directed by Quentin Dupieux. The film is about a tire that comes to life and uses psychokinetic powers to kill people.

The film was produced by Realitism Films and had its world premiere at the Critics' Week of the 2010 Cannes Film Festival, where it received positive reviews from critics.

== Plot ==
A group of people in a California desert are gathered to watch a "film". A sheriff named Chad points out that many moments in cinema happen for "no reason", that life is full of this "no reason", and that this film is an homage to "no reason". In the commencing movie, Chad is sometimes participating in the narrative action and sometimes commenting on it. An accountant passes binoculars to the audience members and rides off on a bicycle, ignoring questions about the upcoming "film". The audience starts looking through their binoculars into the distance, waiting for the "film" to start. Throughout the movie, this group of people witnesses the narrative and display different reactions to what they're seeing.

Somewhere in the desert, a tire named Robert suddenly comes to life. After learning to stand and roll upright, he discovers he has psychokinesis and tests his newfound powers by making inanimate objects and animals explode. A woman drives by and Robert attempts to use his powers on her, but he only succeeds in making her car stall before he is run over by a truck. The woman manages to start her car and drive off. Robert follows down the road and kills the truck driver that ran him over.

Robert locates the woman at a nearby motel and enters the room next to hers. He kills the motel's maid after she throws him out of the room. The accountant, also residing in the motel, gets a call from someone he addresses as "master" and, after hanging up, starts butchering a turkey. Sheriff Chad arrives at the scene to investigate the string of murders. Meanwhile, the accountant visits the in-film audience and throws the cooked turkey towards them, who devour it aggressively, having been starved for two days. Later, all but the one spectator who did not eat any turkey begin to suffer intense abdominal pain. While questioning the motel owner, Chad suddenly stops upon hearing an alarm go off, stating to the motel owner that the audience has started to succumb to the poison and tells him to go home. He says this to his fellow police officers too and tries to convince them that nothing is "real" by having one of them shoot him and reveal the maid's corpse as alive, and while he does survive "fatal" shots accompanied with blood, the corpse is still dead and the accountant informs him of the one still alive spectator. As an embarrassed Chad resumes his investigation, he witnesses Robert kill the motel owner and leads the cops on a "tire hunt". The accountant attempts to persuade the wheelchair-using audience member into eating food, but becomes hungry himself, eats the poisoned food and dies.

Robert comes across a group of people burning a large pile of tires and goes on a 3-day killing spree. Chad lures the tire into a trap using dynamite on a mannequin dressed as the woman and equipped with a remote speaker the woman is speaking through in order to aggravate Robert. The wheelchair user demands a quicker ending to the "film" from Chad, who increases the trap's aggression; Robert blows up the mannequin's head, but the dynamite fails to detonate. The man who uses a wheelchair mocks the sheriff for the botched trap, leading Chad to destroy Robert with a shotgun off-screen and tossing the tire's carcass at the man, who continues to criticize him for the anticlimax. Robert is reincarnated as a tricycle and kills the man in the wheelchair before recruiting an army of tires on his way to Hollywood.

During the credits, the opening scene plays again, but this time from different angles, revealing that Chad is not speaking to anyone.

== Cast ==
- Stephen Spinella as Lieutenant Chad
- Jack Plotnick as Accountant
- Roxane Mesquida as Sheila
- Wings Hauser as Man in Wheelchair
- Ethan Cohn as Movie Buff Ethan
- Charley Koontz as Movie Buff Charley
- Hayley Holmes as Cindy
- Haley Ramm as Fiona
- Daniel Quinn as Dad
- Devin Brochu as Son
- Tara Jean O'Brien as Martina the Cleaning Lady
- David Bowe as Mr. Hugues
- Blake Robbins as Eric
- Remy Thorne as Zach
- Cecelia Antoinette as Woman
- Thomas F. Duffy as Deputy Xavier
- Winston Chow as Deputy Luke
- Pete Dicecco as Deputy Pete
- Courtenay Taylor as Deputy Denise
- James Parks as Deputy Doug
- Gaspard Augé as Hitchhiker
- Pedro Winter as Tyre Burner
- Robert the Tire as Robert

== Production ==
The effects of the tire moving were done via practical effects such as remote controls. Director Quentin Dupieux has noted that due to the inherent "emptiness" of a tire, making a remote-controlled tire was difficult as "you can't really hide the mechanisms well". CGI effects were used for the shots of heads exploding; during filming Dupieux used practical effects, but he was unhappy with the results.

During the writing process, the tire, Robert, was designed solely as a bad guy with no redeeming qualities. While shooting, however, Dupieux determined that this was the wrong approach realizing "there's nothing evil about a tire" based partly on early camera tests. Robert was reworked to be "more like a stupid dog". The 2008 animated film WALL-E, specifically the first act, was also an influence on the character.

The film begins with Lieutenant Chad making a speech about how events in movies often happen for "no reason". Dupieux has stated he was inclined to put that speech in because he was not interested in explaining how the tire came to life, although he knew such a setup would be expected. The meta element of the film came organically, as Dupieux quickly grew tired of writing about a killer tire. He was partly influenced by an experience where he snuck into a theater playing his previous film Steak only to find that no one else was in the theater, which he noted was "kind of scary."

== Release ==
The film was shown on May 15, 2010, at Cannes Critic's Week. After the film was shown at Cannes, it was picked up for US distribution by Magnet Releasing. Rubber had its outside-France premiere on July 9, 2010, at the Fantasia Festival.

Rubber was shown at the Sitges Film Festival where it had a positive reception. The film was shown in Toronto at the After Dark Film Festival. Fangoria magazine stated the film "deeply split" the audience reaction saying that Rubber earned "huge laughs and applause as well as the only boos heard by Fango at the fest."

The DVD and soundtrack were made available to purchase from March 14, 2011, and the DVD and Blu-ray Disc from June 7, 2011.

== Reception ==
On Rotten Tomatoes it has 69% rating based on 87 reviews, with an average rating of 6.10/10. The site's consensus reads: "A clever premise gets plenty of comic blood and violence but it's hampered by some questionable storytelling techniques from director Quentin Dupieux." On Metacritic it has a score of 59% based on reviews from 21 critics, indicating "mixed or average" reviews. Eric Kohn of IndieWire called the film "one of the more bizarre experiments with genre in quite some time" and that it "does begin to wear out its welcome around the sixty-minute mark, but you can't blame Dupieux for giving it a shot."

Outside Cannes, the film received positive reception at other film festivals. Kurt Halfyard of Twitch Film gave the film a positive review saying it was "impeccably shot, scored and designed", and "the film is intellectual wankery of the highest order in the sheepskin of a B-film of the lowest order". Farihah Zaman of The Huffington Post wrote that Quentin Dupieux "succeeds in creating an entertaining, sometimes even tense horror film with the very same footage he lightly mocks. The result is an uber-cerebral spoof that is at once silly and smart, populist like a mildly trashy B-movie yet high brow like absurdist theater." Peter Bradshaw of The Guardian stated that, he "sensed something a little conceited" about the film, but considered it to be "a road movie with a difference".

Sukhdev Sandhu of The Telegraph wrote a negative review of the film, saying "How could it not be brilliant? By, at 85 minutes, being an hour too long. By being arch rather than schlocky. And by wasting too much time on dull dialogue celebrating its 'No Reason' philosophy." Leslie Felperin of Variety also gave a negative review, saying that Rubber is "Neither scary, funny, nor anywhere near as clever as it seems to think it is, pic offers auds few reasons to want to see it beyond its one-joke premise." Justin Lowe of The Hollywood Reporter also gave a negative review, saying "While the filmmaking has a certain casual style and the special effects involving the tire are frequently more absorbing than the narrative, without any relatable characters, identifiable tone or real raison d'etre, Rubber just can't get any traction."

Will Leitch from The Projector concluded his review by stating that Rubber is "a movie about how watching movies is stupid", giving the film a grade D. Brent McKnight of PopMatters wrote "As the tire's tale becomes more bizarre and morbid, Rubber's purpose runs loses traction." Nick Schager of Slant Magazine stated that, "any such gesture is negated not only by the incessant, overt proclamations of pointlessness, but more fundamentally still by the lifelessness of the film as a whole, which with uninvolving affectation manages only to spin its wheels."

Gregory Bernard said of the film: "We're really blessed to have so much attention on such a small film. We both took risks – [Quentin] artistically, me in production – and the fact that we had, in general, a very positive response from the public; we've had audiences who really loved it." Retrospectively, Roselyn Quill of Collider reviewed the film, and provided a positive review, saying: "Embracing a nihilistic mindset can lead to the birth of something entirely fresh and innovative. In this way, Dupieux sets the precedent for what film could be and thus creates an open invitation for others to follow in his footsteps towards "no reason"."

== Soundtrack ==
The official soundtrack for the film Rubber, by Gaspard Augé and Quentin Dupieux (the latter under his stage name "Mr. Oizo"), was released on November 8, 2010, on Ed Banger Records.

== Accolades ==
Awards	Date of ceremony	Category	Recipient(s)	Result	Ref.
Bucheon International Fantastic Film Festival	14–24 July 2011	Best of Puchon	Quentin Dupieux	Won	
Odesa International Film Festival	16–24 July 2010	International Competition – Golden Duke	Quentin Dupieux	Nominated	
Scream Awards	18 October 2011	Best Independent Movie	Rubber	Nominated	
Sitges Film Festival	16 October 2010	Carnet Jove Jury Award – Official Fantastic	Julien Berlan, Grégory Bernard, Josef Lieck and Kevin Van Der Meiren	Won	
Sitges Film Festival	16 October 2010	Grand Prize of European Fantasy Film in Silver – Official Fantàstic Panorama Selection	Quentin Dupieux	Won	
Sitges Film Festival	16 October 2010	Citizen Kane Award for the Best Debut Feature	Quentin Dupieux	Won	
Toronto After Dark Film Festival	13–20 August 2010	Most Original Film	Rubber	Won	
Warsaw Film Festival	8–17 October 2010	Free Spirit Award	Rubber	Nominated	
