= Xavier de Rosnay =

French musician (born 1982)

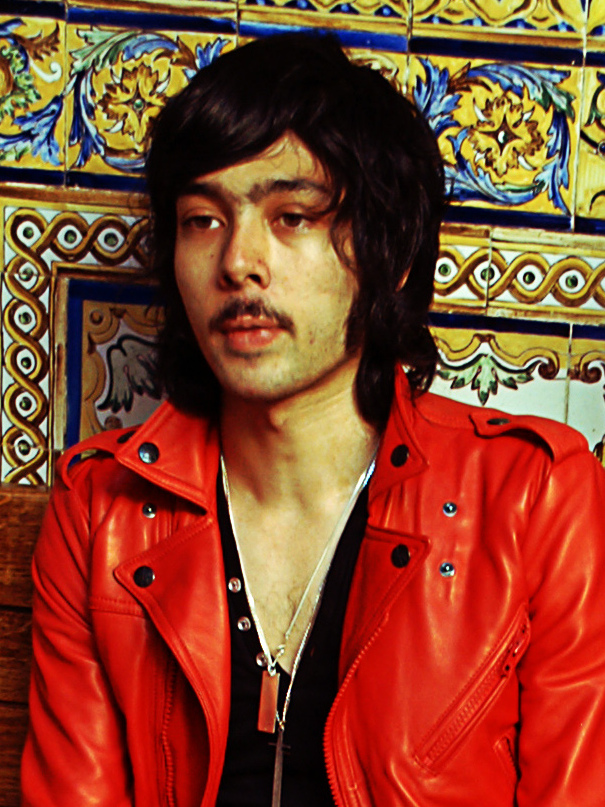
- De Rosnay in 2008

Background information
- Also known as: XDR; Just X; Dustin N'Guyen
- Born: Xavier Dulong de Rosnay; 2 July 1982 (age 44); Ozoir-la-Ferrière, France
- Genre: French house
- Member of: Justice

Xavier Dulong de Rosnay (French pronunciation: [də ʁonɛ]; born 2 July 1982) is a French electronic musician and producer who is one half of the duo Justice with Gaspard Augé.

== Biography ==
Xavier Dulong de Rosnay was born on 2 July 1982 in Ozoir-la-Ferrière, Seine-et-Marne. He is said to have grown up in Paris "on a diet of 1970s prog-rock and 1980s funk". The son of a Vietnamese-born dentist and a human resources director of a Parisian hospital, he studied graphic design at the École Estienne in Paris, where he also met Thibaut Berland (later known as Breakbot). Berland would later cite de Rosnay for his breakthrough into music.

By 2002, while he was finishing up his studies, he stayed at an apartment at the Boulevard Barbès with fellow graphic designers Gaspard "Gaspirator" Augé (whom he had met at a party) and Bertrand "So Me" de Langeron. With Augé, he formed the electronic duo Justice, together producing their breakout hit "We Are Your Friends" for a remix competition in 2003. The remix resulted in the group being signed to Ed Banger (who released it) and became a hit in clubs and on the Internet. In 2005, de Rosnay contributed to the bootlegged album Bootleggers with Respect Vol II, alongside Soulwax, DJ Mehdi and Feadz, all under pseudonyms. In order to produce their debut album Cross (2007), Justice was initially based in de Rosnay's bedroom, but subsequently moved to his basement, which he described as a "cave with a computer in it."

Following the success of Cross and tours around the world, the two embarked on their A Cross The Universe tour in North America during March 2008, which de Rosnay said "close[d] the first chapter for Justice." A documentary of the tour showcased their rockstar lifestyle during the tour, although de Rosnay later clarified there were "not all things we approve of." De Rosnay was also briefly arrested after a violent altercation with a fan, although he was let go after police concluded he had acted in self-defense. In April, he collaborated with Midfield General on the track "Disco Sirens." Two years later, he was enlisted by French duo Jamaica to co-produce their album No Problem alongside Peter Franco. Their joint production was praised by The Guardian and Pitchfork.

De Rosnay and Augé together made their return in Audio, Video, Disco (2011), the second studio album of Justice. It was succeeded by their third, Woman (2016), and the remix album Woman Worldwide (2018). Afterwards, de Rosnay co-produced Prudence's first studio album Beginnings alongside Surkin. In 2022, he produced the EP Man On A Wire by Mehdi Pinson, known professionally as DVNO due to having previously provided vocals to Justice's 2007 song DVNO. That same year co-produced Juliette Armanet's song "Flamme" for her album Brûler le feu. Justice returned with their fourth studio album Hyperdrama in 2024, their first LP in eight years. De Rosnay quipped a "safe prediction" for their next album would be "around 2048".

== Public image ==
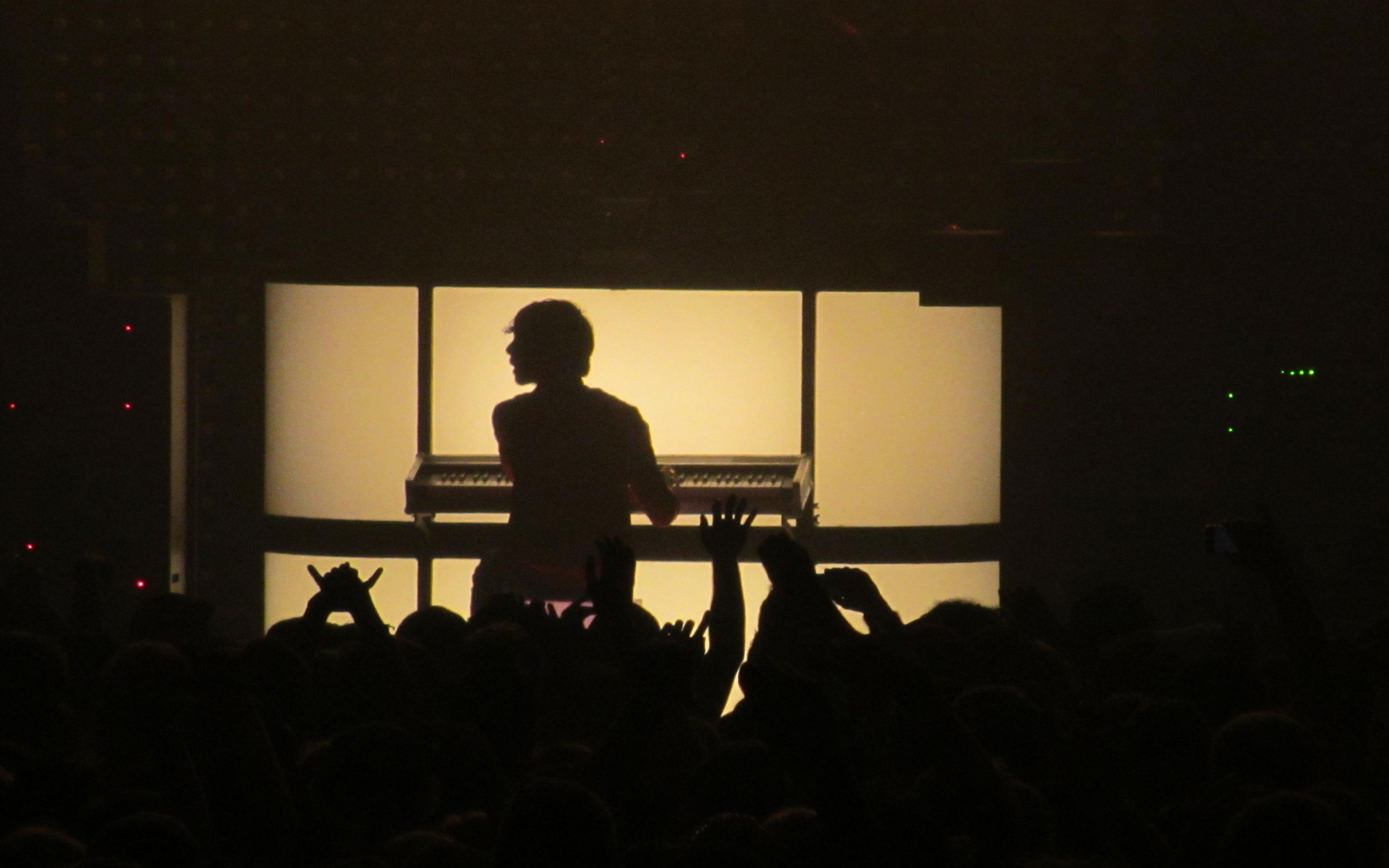
De Rosnay playing the keyboard at a live concert in Chicago, 2012

De Rosnay has been described as the more talkative half of Justice, compared to Augé. In this regard, de Rosnay has been compared to Thomas Bangalter of Daft Punk. Angus Harrison, interviewing Justice for Vice, wrote that when de Rosnay speaks, he launches "into often lengthy, always thoughtful monologues." He has also been noted for his fringe haircut.

== Personal life ==
In a 2008 interview with Nardwuar, de Rosnay said he enjoys cooking, particularly crêpes. In 2025, he described his relationship with Augé as "fusional", adding that "I behave with him the same way I behave with myself. Like almost one entity." He has three children.

== Discography ==
=== Other writing, production, and remix credits ===
Title	Year	Performing artist(s)	Co-producer(s)	Album
[Untitled remix of "Fat Joe- Lean Back"] (as Just X)	2005	LCD Soundsystem	Soulwax, DJ Mehdi, Feadz (Note: Pseudonymously credited as "Soulass," "Idhem," and "Zdaef" respectively)	Bootleggers with Respect Vol II
"Lalaland" (Ed Banger's All Stars Remix)	2006	Play Paul	SebastiAn	—N/a
"Disco Sirens"	2008	Midfield General	Soulwax	General Disarray
"Brooklyn" (Radio Edit) [XDR Rework]	2009	Tahiti Boy and the Palmtree Family	—N/a	1973
No Problem (studio album)	2010	Jamaica	Peter Franco	—N/a
"Nightcall" (Dustin N'Guyen Remix)	2010	Kavinsky	—N/a	—N/a
"This Song" (Suicided by Xavier de Rosnay)	2013	Busy P, Andrew Woodhead	—N/a	Still Busy
Beginnings (studio album)	2021	Prudence	Surkin	—N/a
"Flamme"	2022	Juliette Armanet	Victor Le Masne, Yuksek, Marlon B	Brûler le feu
Man On A Wire (EP)	2022	DVNO	—N/a	—N/a
