= I Can't Live Without You =

Single by Al Walser
- Recorded: September 21, 2012
- Genre: Eurodance
- Length: 4:21
- Label: Cut the Bull Entertainment
- Songwriter(s): Al Walser, Paul Sissons
- Producer(s): Al Walser

"I Can't Live Without You" is a song by the Liechtenstein producer Al Walser.

The song was nominated for Best Dance Recording at the 2013 Grammy Awards. It lost to "Bangarang" by Skrillex & Sirah.

== Reception ==
The song's nomination for a Grammy Award caused controversy. Philip Sherburne of Spin noted a lack of notability of Walser compared to Avicii, Calvin Harris, Skrillex and Swedish House Mafia, also nominated for the award, writing that the song's "clunky rock/trance fusion and low-budget video make Rebecca Black's 'Friday' sound and look cutting-edge in comparison". Bill Freimuth, the vice president of the Recording Academy – which is responsible for the Grammy Awards – told MTV that Walser "was a very active marketer of his work, and got his music out to lots and lots of our voting membership, and they chose to vote for it". He noted that the ballot is audited by Deloitte and said that "they found nothing really anomalous or wrong with the votes surrounding this nomination".

Speculation surrounding the nomination includes Walser's membership of the Recording Academy. Walser stated his position as a voter "was only helpful to the extent that I had access to the other voters, and they could see what I was doing on a regular basis". Billboard compared the incident to Linda Chorney, who gained a Grammy Award nomination the previous year through a similar tactic.

== Track listing ==
Digital download

1. "I Can't Live Without You" (Maui & Chris Mix) – 3:19
2. "I Can't Live Without You" (Malibu Mix) – 3:15
3. "I Can't Live Without You" (Turnyboy Mix) – 3:29
