= Marlon B =

German rapper and singer

Marlon Hanief Correl James (1965/1966 – 9 September 2026), also known as Marlon B and Marlon B. James, was a German rapper and singer.

== Biography ==
Marlon James began his musical career during the early 1990s in Frankfurt. In 1991 he released his only solo single, Da La De La (Africa Center of the World), on Hansa/MCI. He subsequently became involved with Moses Pelham and his label, Pelham Power Productions (3p). He has appeared as a guest singer and rapper on several releases from his label, including those by Sabrina Setlur and Bruda Sven.

In 1999 he joined the band Söhne Mannheims, led by Xavier Naidoo, where he primarily worked as a rapper. He had a significant musical influence on their debut album, Zion. Even after Naidoo's departure, he remained in the band and helped rebuild it. He was also active as a songwriter, writing songs such as Junges Deutschland, Lieder drüber singen and Gesucht & Gefunden. In 2017, he left the band and moved to Jamaica.

== Death ==
On September 9, 2026, Marlon B. James was shot dead in a bar he owned in Robin's Bay in northern Jamaica, along with two other men. The motive for the triple murder remains unclear. On September 11, 2026, James' death was publicly announced via the Söhne Mannheims Instagram page after a Jamaican radio station reported on the murder. Subsequently, a police probe began in response to the murder.

== Discography ==
=== With Söhne Mannheims ===
- 2000: Zion
- 2004: Noiz
- 2005: Power of the Sound
- 2008: Wettsingen in Schwetzingen – MTV Unplugged
- 2009: Iz On
- 2011: Barrikaden von Eden
- 2014: ElyZion
- 2017: MannHeim

=== Solo and other partnerships ===
- 1991: Marlon B – Da La De La (Africa Center of the World) (Single)
- 1999: Jackin’ 4 Beatz – Everybody Loves The Sunshine (Single)
- 2013: DNGRS Crew – Dangerous (featuring Carlprit, Metaphysics and Tony T; vs. DJ Mase)

=== As guest ===
- 1995: Gib Mir Das Mikrofon Part 2 (Video Mix) by Variety Pac
- 1995: Respekt (Teil A) by Variety Pac in Laber mir kein Ohr
- 1998: Schnaps für alle (Jack Daniel's) by Moses Pelham in Schnaps für alle
- 1999: No Test the Empire by Sabrina Setlur in Aus der Sicht und mit den Worten von …
- 1999: Bin wieder da by Bruda Sven in Zungenakrobatik
- 2000: We Ha Fi Reach by D-Flame in Basstard
- 2002: Line Up & Target by Ken Sport in Presents… „The Sun"
- 2002: Celebrate by Darnell in Darnell
- 2005: We Are Warrior (with Marlon B) by Marlene Johnson in Runaway EP
- 2009: Rudeboy by Grosses K in Gross Kaliber
- 2012: Zurück by Azzis mit Herz in Augenblick
- 2012: Für die Ewigkeit by Moses Pelham in Geteiltes Leid 3
