= Escapades (Gaspard Augé album) =

Studio album by Gaspard Augé
- Released: 25 June 2021
- Recorded: 2020–2021
- Studio: Studio du Futur De l'Audiovisuel (Paris) (Note: Recording); Motorbass Studio (Paris) (Note: Recording, Mixing); Disco Casino (Paris) (Note: Mixing); Darkart Mastering (Los Angeles) (Note: Mastering); Translab (Paris) (Note: Lacquer Cut)
- Genre: Synth-pop; electropop; nu-disco; French house
- Length: 41:56
- Label: Ed Banger Records; Genesis (Because Music)
- Producer: Gaspard Augé, Victor le Masne, Michael Declerck

Gaspard Augé chronology
Rubber (2010)	Escapades (2021)

Singles from Escapades
- 1. "Force Majeure" Released: 15 April 2021; 2. "Hey!" Released: 5 May 2021; 3. "Vox" Released: 2 June 2021; 4. "Captain" Released: 16 June 2021; 5. "Belladone" Released: 21 June 2021; 6. "Pentacle" Released: 25 June 2021

Escapades is the debut studio solo album by French electronic musician Gaspard Augé, half of the French electronic duo Justice. It was released on 25 June 2021 by Ed Banger Records through Genesis (Because Music). It was recorded in Paris alongside French producer Victor le Masne, taking only 2 months to complete. Video shorts were released for the singles "Force Majeure", "Hey!", "Captain", and "Belladone", as well as for the song "Pentacle". The album's lead single "Force Majeure" was selected as the official BBC broadcast soundtrack for UEFA Euro 2020.

== Background ==
In an interview with NME, Augé described the project as a means for him to explore and develop music he backlogged over the years: "I had a vast amount of melodies and arrangement ideas for years and just took the opportunity to do my own thing." He further explains that the album incorporates musical and film score elements from the 60's, 70's and 80's, touching on themes ranging from Italian horror to psychedelic folk "and every conceivable point between". He adds that the album's orchestral qualities and lack of lyrics hopefully "stimulates the imagination." Indeed, part of Augé's inspiration to produce the record lied in his frustration with the musical industry's adherence to simplistic and codified structure in modern musical releases, "Everything seems so controlled and minimal; as soon as you put too many notes it’s seen as not right." Overall, the album explores notions of escapism from standardized creative expression, with the goal of reorienting the listener toward a more expansive and diverse creative process, alongside an augmented sense experience.

== Critical reception ==
Escapades received generally positive reviews from music critics. Metacritic, which assigns a normalised rating out of 100 to reviews from mainstream publications, gives the album an average score of 73, based on 6 reviews. A review by Pitchfork describes its melodies as "excellent," with every element "primed for enormity — a sandwich packed with hefty slabs of prime rib, rather than the sensory overload of experimental modern cooking." Ben Devlin of musicOMH describes the album as "captivating in all its eccentricities, evocative and groovy in equal measure", and that "with this album Augé well and truly proves himself as an artist in his own right." Damian Jones from NME reflects in a 3/5 review that "Augé’s thirst for the strange makes this album an odd but interesting solo proposition, which still makes some room for dancefloor slayers", while noting that the lead single "admittedly could have easily slotted into any Justice record with its trademark industrial synth jabs and propulsive beats." Uncut described the album as having "extremely polished music that sometimes strays a little into fromage [...] but where it works, it can sweep you off your feet."

Professional ratings
Aggregate scores
Source	Rating
Metacritic	73/100
Review scores
Source	Rating
AllMusic	4/5 stars
Clash	8/10
musicOMH	4/4 stars
mxdwn	Favorable
NME	3/5 stars
Pitchfork	3.5/5 stars
Uncut	6/10

== Track listing ==
No.	Title	Length
1.	"Welcome"	0:38
2.	"Force Majeure"	3:26
3.	"Rocambole"	3:25
4.	"Europa"	3:47
5.	"Pentacle"	3:56
6.	"Hey!"	4:14
7.	"Captain"	3:22
8.	"Lacrimosa"	3:48
9.	"Belladone"	4:16
10.	"Casablanca"	3:30
11.	"Vox"	3:08
12.	"Rêverie"	4:26
Total length:		41:56

== Personnel ==
Credits adapted from AllMusic.

Musicians

- Gaspard Augé - keyboard; production, arrangement, composition (tracks 2 to 12)
- Victor le Masne - drums, keyboard, piano; production, arrangement, composition (tracks 1, 5, 7, 9 and 12)
- Xavier Le Masne - flute (tracks 8 and 10)
- Laura Etchegoyhen – chorus (tracks 5 to 8, and 11), vocals (tracks 4, 9 and 12)
- Audrey Thirot - chorus (tracks 5 to 8, and 11)
- Elena Azevedo Da Silva - chorus (tracks 5 to 8, and 11)
- Sibylle Chalamon – chorus (tracks 5 to 8, and 11)

Technical

- Michael Declerck - production, engineering, mixing
- Antoine Poyeton - engineering, recording
- Louis Bes - recording
- Louis Gallet - recording
- Mike Bell - mastering

Artwork

- Filip Nilsson - art direction
- Thomas Jumin - artwork
- Adrien Blanchat - sleeve art
- Jasper J. Spanning - photography
- Marina Monge - costume design

Other

- Marie Pieprzownik - lacquer cut

== Charts ==
Chart (2021)	Peak position
French Albums (SNEP)	47
Belgian Albums (Ultratop Wallonia)	55
Swiss Albums (Schweizer Hitparade)	62

== Release history ==
Region	Date	Format	Label	Ref.
FR and UK	25 June 2021	CD; LP; download; streaming	Genesis (Because Music)	
