= Gaspard Augé =

French musician (born 1979)

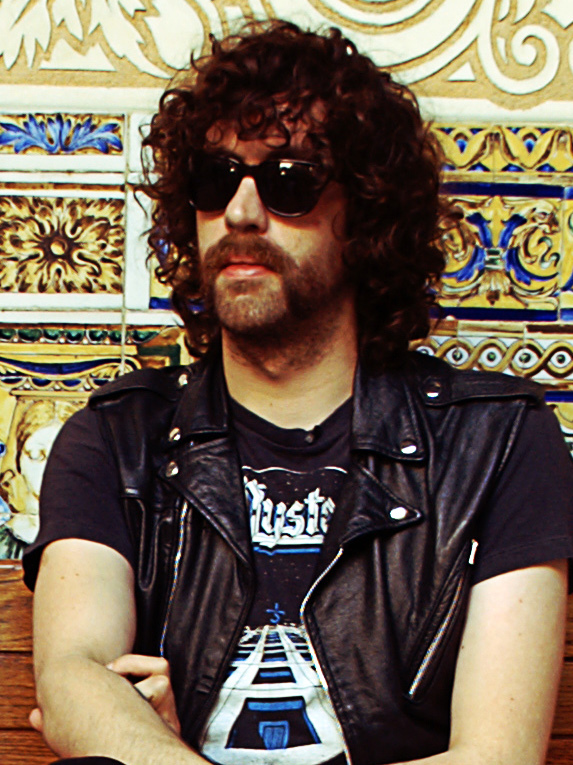
- Augé in 2008

Background information
- Born: 21 May 1979 (age 47); Besançon, Franche-Comté, France
- Occupations: Musician; record producer; songwriter; DJ; composer
- Instrument: Synthesizer
- Years active: 2003–present
- Label: Ed Banger/Because Music
- Member of: Justice

Gaspard Michel Andre Augé (French pronunciation: [ɡaspaʁ oʒe]; born 21 May 1979 in Besançon) is a French musician and graphic designer. He is one of the two members of French electronic music duo Justice along with Xavier de Rosnay.

== Biography ==
Gaspard Michel Andre Augé was born into a family of Protestant industrialists from Besançon, France. He is the nephew of André Marcel Augé, whose father André Augé founded Augé Découpage, a metallurgy company now owned by Diehl Metall.

He created his first musical project Microloisir (Back in your Eyes), recorded in his home with a computer microphone and an Ableton sequencer. He later became a retro-futurist graphic designer, under the pseudonym Gaspirator, and designed shirts for Sixpack France, one of which was worn by M. Pokora in the music video for his single Dangerous.

In 2010, he designed the covers for Surkin's Silver Island, Fan Out Remixes and Ultra Light EPs. Gaspard was also chosen to compose the music for the film Rubber with Mr. Oizo. He also makes an appearance in the film in the role of a hitchhiker.

As part of Justice, Augé received a Grammy Award in 2019 alongside de Rosnay for their remix album Woman Worldwide, under the category for Best Dance/Electronic Album.

Between 2020 and 2021, Augé co-produced Kavinsky's second album, Reborn. He release his first solo studio album, Escapades, on 25 June 2021.

== Discography ==
=== Albums ===
List of studio albums, with selected details and chart positions
Title	Details	Peak chart positions		
Title	Details	FRA	BEL (Wa)	SWI
Escapades	Released: 25 June 2021; Label: Because Music; Format: Vinyl, CD, digital download, streaming	47	55	62

=== Collaborative studio albums ===
Title	Details	Peak chart positions		
Title	Details	FRA	BEL (Wa)	SWI
Rubber (with Mr. Oizo)	Released: 8 November 2010; Label: Because Music; Format: Vinyl, CD, digital download, streaming	-	-	-

=== Remixes ===
Year	Title	Artist
2021	"Moving Men" ("Removing Men" Remix with Victor Le Masne)	Myd (featuring Mac DeMarco)
2021	"Keep Moving" (with Victor Le Masne)	Jungle
2021	"Wake Me Up" (with Victor Le Masne)	FOALS
2021	"Somethinggreater" (with Victor Le Masne)	Parcels
2022	"Cameo" (with Victor Le Masne)	Kavinsky
