= Klaxons discography =

British music band's discography

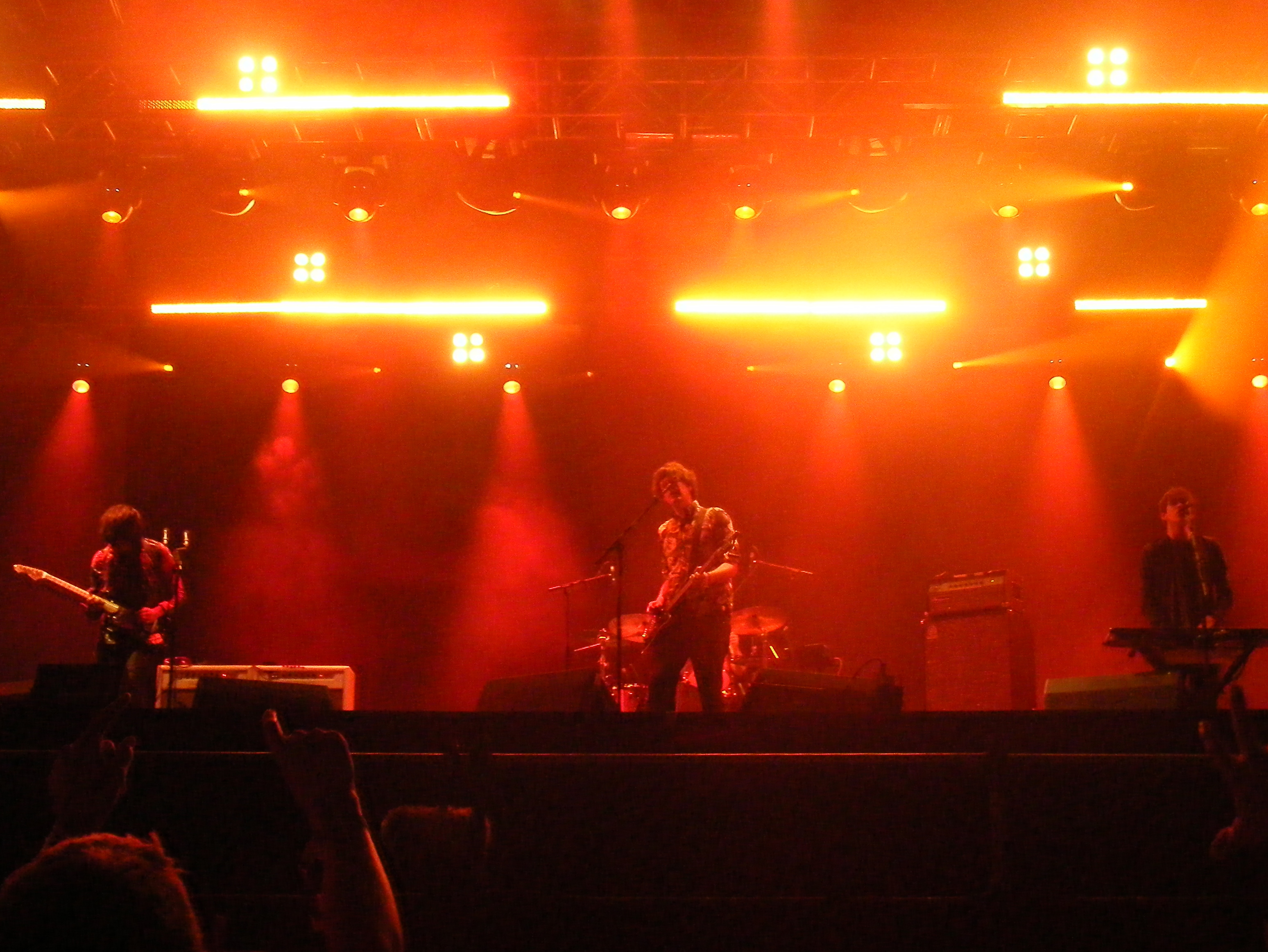
- Klaxons performing at the Bestival 2009
- Studio albums: 3
- Extended plays: 2
- Compilation albums: 1
- Singles: 9
- Music videos: 9

The discography of British indie rock band Klaxons consists of three studio albums, one compilation album, one extended play (EP), and nine singles. Klaxons were formed in October 2005 in New Cross, London by Jamie Reynolds, James Righton and Simon Taylor-Davis. Steffan Halperin joined as an official member in February 2007.

Klaxons debut single "Gravity's Rainbow" was released on 27 March 2006, through the Angular Recording Corporation. The release was limited to 500 copies and on 7-inch vinyl only. Second single "Atlantis to Interzone" was released on 12 June 2006, before signing with major label Polydor Records two months later. Klaxons' debut EP Xan Valleys, a compilation of both previous singles alongside various remixes, was released on 17 October 2006.

The band released their debut album Myths of the Near Future worldwide in January 2007. The record debuted at number two on the UK Albums Chart, and spent five weeks on the Billboard Heatseekers Albums Chart, peaking at number 22. The album spawned multiple singles, with the highest charting "Golden Skans" peaking at number 7 on the UK Singles Chart. Myths of the Near Future won the Nationwide Mercury Prize, and was certified Platinum in the United Kingdom on 21 September 2007.

During touring and promotion of Myths.., Klaxons released A Bugged Out Mix by Klaxons on 1 October 2007, their second album and first compilation album of multiple artists' songs. Three years following, Klaxons released their second studio album Surfing the Void on 23 August 2010. The album charted highest in the United Kingdom, peaking at number ten on the UK Albums Chart. The album also charted in multiple countries worldwide, including number fifteen on the ARIA Charts, their first charting album in Australia.

== Studio albums ==
List of studio albums, with selected chart positions and certifications
Title	Album details	Peak chart positions										Certifications
Title	Album details	UK	AUS	BEL (FL)	BEL (WA)	FRA	IRL	JPN	NED	SWI	US Heat	Certifications
Myths of the Near Future	Released: 29 January 2007; Label: Polydor; Format(s): CD, LP, digital download	2	73	62	87	24	4	35	83	—	22	BPI: Platinum; IRMA: Gold
Surfing the Void	Released: 23 August 2010; Label: Polydor; Formats: CD, LP, digital download	10	15	66	33	51	39	17	— (Note: Surfing the Void did not enter the Dutch Album Top 100, but entered the Dutch Alternative Top 30 chart at number 28.)	31	49	
Love Frequency	Released: 16 June 2014; Label: Akashic Rekords (Sony); Formats: CD, LP, digital download	38	—	159	86	160	—	103	—	—	—	
"—" denotes albums that did not chart, or were not released in that country.

== Compilation albums ==
Title	Album details
A Bugged Out Mix by Klaxons	Released: 1 October 2007; Label: New State Music; Format(s): 2×CD

== EPs ==
Title	EP details
Xan Valleys	Released: 17 October 2006; Label: Modular; Format(s): CD, digital download
Sweetheart	Released: 19 October 2009; Label: Blast First Petite; Formats: LP, DD
Landmarks of Lunacy	Released: 25 December 2010; Label: Self-released; Format(s): Digital download

== Singles ==
List of singles, with selected chart positions, showing year released as single and album name
Title	Year	Peak chart positions										Certifications	Album
Title	Year	UK	AUS	BEL (FL)	BEL (WA)	EUR	FRA	IRE	JPN	MEX	SCO	Certifications	Album
"Gravity's Rainbow" (Note: "Gravity's Rainbow" was re-recorded and re-released in 2007.)	2006	35	—	—	—	—	—	—	—	—	22		Myths of the Near Future
"Atlantis to Interzone"	2006	182	—	—	—	—	—	—	—	—	—		Myths of the Near Future
"Magick"	2006	29	—	—	—	—	—	—	—	—	20		Myths of the Near Future
"Golden Skans"	2007	7	—	61	67	8	—	29	—	—	6	BPI: Platinum	Myths of the Near Future
"It's Not Over Yet"	2007	13	—	62	—	—	—	—	—	—	12	BPI: Silver	Myths of the Near Future
"Sweetheart"	2009	—	—	—	—	—	—	—	—	—	—		Non-album single
"Echoes"	2010	55	95	72	70	—	—	—	94	17	53		Surfing the Void
"Twin Flames"	2010	—	—	—	—	—	—	—	—	30	—		Surfing the Void
"There Is No Other Time"	2014	42	—	53	83	—	177	—	—	—	38		Love Frequency
"Show Me a Miracle"	2014	98	—	72	—	—	—	—	—	—	—		Love Frequency
"A New Reality"	2014	—	—	—	—	—	—	—	—	—	—		Love Frequency
"—" denotes single that did not chart or was not released

== Music videos ==
Song	Year	Director
"Gravity's Rainbow"	2006	Saam Farahmand
"Atlantis to Interzone"	2006	Oliver Evans
"Magick"	2006	Saam Farahmand
"Golden Skans"	2006	Saam Farahmand
"Gravity's Rainbow (new version)"	2007	Saam Farahmand
"It's Not Over Yet"	2007	Saam Farahmand
"Echoes"	2010	Saam Farahmand
"Twin Flames"	2010	Saam Farahmand
"There Is No Other Time"	2014	Georgia Hudson
"Show Me a Miracle"	2014	Brthr
