= We Can Create =

Studio album by Maps
- Released: 16 April 2007 (Download)
- Recorded: 2006
- Genres: Indietronica, shoegazing, dream pop
- Length: 52:16
- Language: English
- Label: Mute Records
- Producers: James Chapman, Valgeir Sigurdsson and Ken Thomas

Maps chronology
We Can Create (2007)	Turning the Mind (2009)

Singles from We Can Create
- 1. "Lost My Soul" Released: 26 March 2006; 2. "Don't Fear" Released: 30 October 2006; 3. "It Will Find You" Released: 30 April 2007; 4. "You Don't Know Her Name" Released: 7 August 2007; 5. "To the Sky" Released: 16 October 2007

Professional ratings
Review scores
Source	Rating
Allmusic	3.5/5 stars
BBC	link
Drowned In Sound	8/10 stars
The Guardian	4/5 stars
The Independent	4/5 stars
MusicOMH	3.5/5 stars
NME	8/10 stars
Popmatters	7/10 stars
Spin	3/5 stars
The Times	4/5 stars

We Can Create is the debut album from Northampton-based artist Maps, released digitally on 16 April 2007, and physically on 14 May 2007. It was shortlisted for the 2007 Mercury Music Prize, but lost out to Klaxons debut album Myths of the Near Future. Five singles were released from the album.

== Album information ==
Since the album has been released, it has been seen as a critical success even though sales have been fairly modest. His first North American release, To the Sky EP, was digitally released on 22 May on the same label.

Maps has toured playing the album's songs with a full live line-up. Maps played the Latitude Festival in Southwold on 13 July, as well as the Leeds and Reading Festivals on 24 and 26 August. They played on five dates in the United States later in the same year.

James was supported by four local musicians for live shows. Phil Thurlby and Matthew Roberts were on keyboards and vocals, Andrew Lowther was on bass and Ben Gordelier was on drums.

On 17 July it was announced that We Can Create had been nominated for the Mercury Music Prize. However, it lost out to Klaxons' debut album Myths of the Near Future.

The album artwork for We Can Create and all the singles leading up to its release were created by CitizenBB (Ben Brown) at Citizen.

== Track listing ==
All tracks are written by James Chapman.

No.	Title	Length
1.	"So Low, So High"	3:57
2.	"You Don't Know Her Name"	3:52
3.	"Elouise"	5:22
4.	"It Will Find You"	5:33
5.	"Glory Verse"	5:30
6.	"Liquid Sugar"	3:53
7.	"To the Sky"	4:16
8.	"Back + Forth"	3:42
9.	"Lost My Soul"	3:50
10.	"Don't Fear"	6:10
11.	"When You Leave"	6:07
12.	"It Will Find You (Maps Enlighten Mix)" (iTunes Bonus Track)	8:14
Total length:		52:16

== Singles ==
- "Lost My Soul": 6 March 2006
- "Don't Fear": 30 October 2006
- "It Will Find You": 30 April 2007
- "You Don't Know Her Name": 6 August 2007
- "To the Sky": 16 October 2007
