= Sweethearts =

Sweethearts may refer to:

== Films and television ==
- Sweethearts (1938 film), a MGM film starring Jeanette MacDonald and Nelson Eddy
- Sweethearts (1990 film), an Australian film
- Sweethearts (1996 film), a film by Birger Larsen nominated for the Academy Award for Live Action Short Film
- Sweethearts (1997 film), an independent film starring Janeane Garofalo
- Sweethearts (2019 film), a German film
- Sweethearts (2024 film), a romantic-comedy directed by Jordan Weiss
- Sweethearts (British game show), a British version hosted by Larry Grayson
- Sweethearts (American game show), an American version hosted by Charles Nelson Reilly and guest-hosted by Richard Kline

== Music ==
- Sweethearts (music group), an Australian new soul group
- Sweethearts (musical), a 1913 operetta by Victor Herbert
- The Sweethearts, or Sweethearts of Sigma, an American trio of backing singers

== Other ==
- Sweethearts (book), a book by Sharon Rich, the full title being Sweethearts: The Timeless Love Affair Onscreen and Off Between Jeanette MacDonald and Nelson Eddy
- Sweethearts (candy), a heart shaped candy
- Sweethearts (comics), a romance comic published first by Fawcett Publications from 1948 to 1953 and continued by Charlton Comics from 1954 to 1973
- Sweethearts (play), a two-act 1874 comedy by W.S. Gilbert based on a song of the same name by Gilbert and Arthur Sullivan
- "The Sweethearts; or, The Top and the Ball", an 1843 fairytale by Hans Christian Andersen

== See also ==
- Sweethearts on Parade (disambiguation)
- Sweetheart (disambiguation)
