= Bestival 2010 =

Music festival on the Isle of Wight

- Bestival 2010 Logo
- Genre: electronic music, Rock, Pop, Dance
- Dates: 9–12 September 2010
- Locations: Robin Hill Country Park, Downend, Isle of Wight, UK
- Website: Bestival - News

Bestival 2010 was the seventh installment of the Bestival, a boutique music festival held at Robin Hill Country Park on the Isle of Wight. The festival, organized by Rob and Josie Da Bank and their crew, was held over the weekend between 9 September and 12 September 2010. It was voted the best major UK festival in the UK festival awards. This is the first time it has won the major festival award, rather than the medium-sized festival award. Each year a fancy dress theme is announced; 2010 was the year of the fantastic and so festival goers dressed in fantasy outfits. The festival boasts its own radio station called Bestival Radio. The station was broadcast on-site, played music and kept listeners camping at the festival up-to-date on news and events over the weekend. The first acts were announced on 4 February.

Bestival 2010 was composed, like the years before, of several areas with different topic:

- FANTASY FIELD hosting the Main stage, the Big Top
- FIRE FIELD hosting the Arcadia's Spider (a flame spurting 15-metre high metal spider!)
- BOLLYWOOD FIELD hosting the big Bollywood bar tent designed by Josie da Bank
- MAGIC MEADOW hosting the Rock'n'Roll stage and the psychedelic Fantasy Castle Bonfire built on an apple core of earth
- THE WISHING TREE FIELD hosting the Cabaret tent, the party tent Chai Wallahs and the Wishing Tree (an 8-metre tall, triple-tier tree)
- TOMORROW'S WORLD: a sustainable and green vision of the future. Hosting the Solar Powered Bandstand and the Plugged In Eco-House supported by Scottish and Southern Energy, the Eden Project, the Science Museum Tent, the Gazebo in the Woods, the 3-D audio visual sculpture made by the members of the band The XX and many others projects

== Line up ==
Dizzee Rascal, Flaming Lips, Hot Chip, Roxy Music, The Prodigy, LCD Soundsystem, Flying Lotus, The Gaslamp Killer, Richie Hawtin present Plastikman, Four Tet, Caribou, Mount Kimbie, Joy Orbison, Magda, Zero 7, Nathan Fake, Dave Clarke, Tensnake, Skream, Shy FX, Joker, David Rodigan, Ulrich Schnauss, Gil Scott-Heron, Wailers Band, Chase & Status, Echo & the Bunnymen, Simian Mobile Disco, Delphic, Rolf Harris, Marc Almond, Ellie Goulding, Mumford & Sons, The Temper Trap, The XX, Fever Ray, Tricky, Example, Heaven 17 and many others

== Main stage ==
Friday

- Dizzee Rascal
- Hot Chip
- Simian Mobile Disco
- Gil Scott-Heron
- dan le sac vs Scroobius Pip
- The Jolly Boys
- Example
- Barry Peters
- Level 42

Saturday

- The Flaming Lips
- Roxy Music
- Mumford & Sons
- The Correspondents
- Ellie Goulding
- The Wailers
- Rolf Harris
- Stornoway
- Eliza Doolittle
- Rox
- Portico Quartet

Sunday

- The Prodigy
- Chase & Status
- Chic Feat. Nile Rodgers
- Echo & The Bunnymen
- Marc Almond
- The Cuban Brothers
- Beth Jeans Houghtin
- Lucky Elephant
- Gaggle

== Big Top ==
Thursday

- Heaven 17
- Back To The Phuture
- Janelle Monáe

Friday

- Plastikman
- Tricky
- Flying Lotus
- The XX
- Joy Orbison
- Delphic
- Wild Beasts
- Four Tet
- Ulrich Schnauss

Saturday

- Erol Alkan
- Mylo
- Jónsi (Sigur Rós)
- Annie Mac
- Everything Everything
- Cornershop
- Hurts

Sunday

- LCD Soundsystem
- Fever Ray
- Vitalic
- Fat Freddy's Drop
- Beardyman
- Tunng
