= Maps (musician) =

English record producer

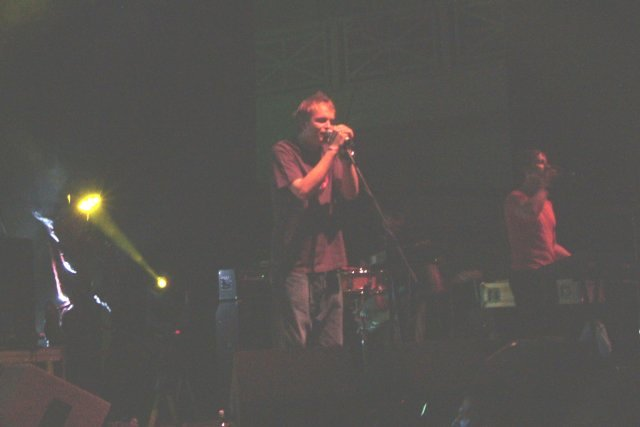
- Maps performing at the Summer Sundae festival in Leicester, 11 August 2007

Background information
- Born: James Kenneth Chapman
- Origin: Northampton, England
- Genres: Electronica; indietronica; dream pop; indie pop; electropop; synthpop
- Occupations: Record producer; songwriter; remixer
- Years active: 2006–present
- Label: Mute
- Website: thisismaps.com

James Kenneth Chapman, known professionally as Maps, is an English record producer, songwriter and remixer.

== Career ==
=== Start Something ===
In 2006, he recorded his Start Something EP by himself on his 16-track recorder. He released it on his own record label, Last Space Recordings, and it was met with some critical acclaim. The single "Lost My Soul" polled at number 26 in NME's Top 50 singles of 2006.

=== We Can Create ===
On 19 May 2007, his debut studio album We Can Create was released on Mute Records. His first North American release, To the Sky EP, was digitally released on 22 May on the same label.

Maps has toured playing the album's songs with a full live line-up. For the touring of We Can Create, James was supported by four local musicians for live shows. On 17 July, it was announced that We Can Create had been nominated for the Mercury Music Prize. However, it lost out to Klaxons' debut album Myths of the Near Future.

=== Turning the Mind ===
On 22 February 2009, James wrote on his MySpace blog about his new upcoming album, saying "I've never been more confident and excited about this new album".

Turning the Mind was released on 28 September 2009 in Europe, and 20 October in North America.

=== Vicissitude ===
Maps' third album, titled Vicissitude, was released on Mute on 8 July 2013.

=== Realigned ===
A compilation album of remixes, titled Realigned, was released on Mute on 15 August 2014. It is a collection of remixed tracks from all three of Maps' studio albums.

=== onDeadWaves ===
In 2016 Chapman collaborated with Mute Records label mate Polly Scattergood, under the name onDeadWaves. They released their self-titled album to positive reviews, and played live shows to promote the album, including some support slots with M83 (band)

=== Colours. Reflect. Time. Loss. ===
Chapman released his fourth studio album, Colours. Reflect. Time. Loss., through Mute Records on 10 May 2019. It is said to be his most ambitious work to date, and has seen him work with orchestral musicians, female vocalists, percussionists and a drummer. Maps returned to the live arena that same year to promote the album with a full live band, for a number of shows in the U.K., including a sold out show at The Purcell Room, Southbank Centre in July 2019.

== Discography ==
=== Studio albums ===
Year	Album details
2007	We Can Create: Released: 14 May 2007; Label: Mute Records
2009	Turning the Mind: Released: 28 September 2009; Label: Mute Records
2013	Vicissitude: Released: 8 July 2013; Label: Mute Records
2019	Colours. Reflect. Time. Loss.: Released: 10 May 2019; Label: Mute Records
2022	Counter Melodies: Released: 26 October 2022; Label: Mute Records
2025	Welcome to the Tudor Gate: Released: 31 October 2025; Label: Mute Records

=== Extended plays ===
Year	EP details
2006	Start Something: Released: 13 November 2006; Label: Last Space Recordings
2007	To the Sky: Released: 22 May 2007; Label: Mute Records

=== Singles ===
Year	Single details
2005	"Start Something": Released: 3 October 2005; Label: Last Space Recordings
2006	"Lost My Soul": Released: 6 March 2006; Label: Unknown
2006	"Don't Fear": Released: 30 October 2006; Label: Unknown
2007	"It Will Find You": Released: 7 May 2007; Label: Mute Records
2007	"You Don't Know Her Name": Released: 13 August 2007; Label: Mute Records
2007	"To the Sky": Released: 8 October 2007; Label: Mute Records
2009	"Let Go of the Fear": Released: 11 May 2009; Label: Mute Records
2009	"I Dream of Crystal": Released: 11 September 2009; Label: Mute Records
2010	"Die Happy, Die Smiling": Released: 25 January 2010; Label: Mute Records
2013	"A.M.A.": Released: 24 June 2013; Label: Mute Records
2013	"You Will Find a Way": Released: 14 October 2013; Label: Mute Records
