= Bestival 2009 =

Music festival on the Isle of Wight

- The logo for Bestival 2009.
- Genre: Alternative, boutique
- Dates: 11–13 September 2009
- Locations: Robin Hill, Downend, Isle of Wight, UK
- Website: Official website

The Bestival 2009 was the sixth installment of the Bestival, a boutique music festival held at Robin Hill on the Isle of Wight. The festival was held over the weekend between 11 September and 13 September 2009. Each year a fancy dress theme is announced, this year's being outer space with the title 'A Space Oddity'. The festival boasts its own radio station called Bestival Radio. The station is broadcast on-site, plays music and keeps listeners camping at the festival up-to-date on news and events over the weekend. Headline acts were announced as Massive Attack, Kraftwerk and Elbow.

== Line-up ==
The main line-up for the event was as follows:

=== Main stage ===
Friday

- Massive Attack
- MGMT
- Soulwax
- Florence & the Machine
- Friendly Fires
- Passion Pit
- 65daysofstatic
- The Acorn
- Arcade Eden

Saturday

- Kraftwerk
- Klaxons
- The Cuban Brothers
- Seasick Steve
- Lily Allen
- The Correspondents
- Mika
- Little Boots
- Beardyman
- Goldie Lookin' Chain
- Jaguar Skillz
- Golden Silvers
- Joe Gideon & the Shark

Sunday

- Elbow
- Fleet Foxes
- English National Ballet
- Doves
- Björn Again
- Kitty Daisy & Lewis
- James Harwood, Fabio
- Lendrum & Mike Cuban
- Michael Nyman
- Feeling Gloomy (DJ)
- Music from the Penguin Cafe
- The Low Anthem
- Shanklin Freakshow

=== Big Top ===
Friday

- Metronomy
- 2ManyDJs
- Bat For Lashes
- Frankmusik
- Fabio & Grooverider

Saturday

- King Roc
- The Future Sound of London
- DJ Yoda
- La Roux
- MDS Diplo
- MDS Buraka
- MDS Boy 8 Bit

Sunday

- Carl Cox (Old Skool Set)
- Squarepusher
- The Field

=== Comedy ===
- Craig Campbell
- Jason John Whitehead
- Andrew Maxwell
- Fullmooners
- Abandoman
- Doc Brown
- Bob Slayer
- Tiffany Stephenson
