= A Cross the Universe (album) =

Live album by Justice
- Released: 24 November 2008
- Recorded: 27 March 2008
- Length: 74:34
- Label: Ed Banger; Because
- Producer: Gaspard Augé; Xavier de Rosnay; Romain Gavras

Justice chronology
Planisphère (2008)	A Cross the Universe (2008)	Audio, Video, Disco (2011)

Professional ratings
Review scores
Source	Rating
AllMusic	link
Billboard	favorable link
Chart Attack	link
NME	link
Pitchfork	6.5/10 link
Spin	link
The Times	link
URB	link

A Cross the Universe is the first live album by the French electronic music duo Justice, released on 24 November 2008 on iTunes and on 9 December 2008 physically by Ed Banger Records and Because Music in France, and Atlantic Records in the US.

== History and background ==
The album's title is a play on words of the Beatles song "Across the Universe" and the band's own album †. The live portion of this release was recorded at a concert in San Francisco, California at the Concourse Exhibition Center, on 27 March 2008. The CD also came with a DVD of the film of the same name called A Cross the Universe.

== Track listing ==
A Cross the Universe CD track listing
No.	Title	Length
1.	"Intro"	0:38
2.	"Genesis"	7:20
3.	"Phantom P† I"	2:50
4.	"Phantom P† I.5"	4:45
5.	"D.A.N.C.E."	2:44
6.	"D.A.N.C.E. P† II"	2:39
7.	"DVNO"	2:58
8.	"Waters of Nazareth (Prelude)"	2:14
9.	"Two Minutes to Midnight"	3:52
10.	"Tthhee Ppaarrttyy"	2:47
11.	"Let There Be Lite"	3:25
12.	"Stress"	7:38
13.	"We Are Your Friends (Reprise)"	3:42
14.	"Waters of Nazareth"	6:46
15.	"Phantom P† II"	9:54
16.	"Encore"	1:07
17.	"NY Excuse"	6:13
18.	"Final"	2:55

Notes

- "Phantom P† I" contains a sample of "Tenebre" (from the Tenebrae soundtrack) by Goblin.
- "Phantom P† I.5" contains a sample of "Tenebre" by Goblin.
- "Waters of Nazareth (Prelude)" contains a sample of "The Fallen (Justice Remix)" by Franz Ferdinand.
- "Let There Be Lite" contains a sample of "Skitzo Dancer" by Scenario Rock.
- "Stress" contains a sample of "Nazis" by Mr. Oizo.
- "We Are Your Friends (Reprise)" contains samples from "Never Be Alone" by Simian, "Atlantis To Interzone" by Klaxons, and "Just One Fix" by Ministry.
- "Waters of Nazareth" contains samples from "Killing In The Name" by Rage Against the Machine and "The Fallen" by Franz Ferdinand.
- "Encore" contains a sample of "Never Be Alone" by Simian.
- "NY Excuse" is a remix of "NY Excuse" by Soulwax.
- "Final" contains samples from "Master of Puppets" by Metallica and “The Party” by Justice.

== Charts ==
Chart performance for A Cross the Universe
Chart (2008)	Peak position
Belgian Albums (Ultratop Flanders)	39
Belgian Alternative Albums (Ultratop Flanders)	15
Belgian Albums (Ultratop Flanders)	42
Dutch Albums (Album Top 100)	94
French Albums (SNEP)	34
Japanese Albums (Oricon)	82
UK Albums (OCC)	124
UK Dance Albums (OCC)	3
US Top Dance Albums (Billboard)	8
US Heatseekers Albums (Billboard)	13
