= Sweetheart =

Sweetheart is a term of endearment often applied to a loved one, or a person who demonstrates a significant amount of kindness.

Sweetheart may also refer to:

== Places ==
- Sweetheart Abbey in Scotland
- Sweetheart City, Wisconsin, United States

== Arts, entertainment, and media ==
=== Films ===
- Sweetheart, also known as Toutes peines confondues, a 1992 film
- Sweetheart (2015 film), a Bangladeshi romantic drama film
- Sweetheart (2019 American film), a survival horror film
- Sweetheart (2019 French film), a comedy-drama film
- Sweetheart (2021 film), a British coming-of-age film
- Sweetheart!, an Indian romantic-comedy film
- Sweetheart (2025 film), an Italian family drama film

=== Music ===
- Sweetheart (album), a 1971 album by Engelbert Humperdinck
- "Sweetheart" (Bee Gees song), covered by Engelbert Humperdinck
- "Sweetheart" (Rainy Davis song), covered by Mariah Carey and Jermaine Dupri
- "Sweetheart" (Franke and the Knockouts song)
- Sweetheart, a Finnish noise rock band of the 1990s founded by Janne Westerlund
- Sweet heart, a 2009 EP and single by the Klaxons

== Brands and enterprises ==
- Sweethearts (candy), a popular Valentine's Day heart shaped candy
- Sweetheart Cup Company

== Fauna and flora ==
- Sweetheart (crocodile) (died 1979), famous Australian crocodile
- Galium aparine, a weed
- Talinum fruticosum, an herbaceous perennial plant

== Other uses ==
- Sweetheart deal or sweetheart contract
- Sweetheart neckline
- Childhood sweetheart

== See also ==
- Sweethearts (disambiguation)
