= Xan Valleys =

EP by Klaxons
- Released: 16 October 2006
- Genre: New rave, dance-punk, post-punk revival, indie rock
- Label: Modular
- Producer: James Ford

Klaxons chronology
Xan Valleys (2006)	Myths of the Near Future (album) (2007)

Professional ratings
Review scores
Source	Rating
AllMusic	3/5 stars
Pitchfork	7.7/10
PopMatters	7/10

Xan Valleys is the first extended play (EP) released by British indie rock band Klaxons. Released on 16 October 2006, the album was released by Modular Recordings, the band's final release before signing with major label Polydor Records. Three of the tracks, "4 Horsemen of 2012", "Gravity's Rainbow" and "Atlantis to Interzone" would appear as re-recorded versions on the band's debut album, Myths of the Near Future. Following this EP, the band re-released "Gravity's Rainbow" on 9 April 2007.

The two remix tracks, "Gravity's Rainbow" and "Atlantis to Interzone", were made by fellow Modular Recordings artist Van She and fellow Merok Records artist Crystal Castles.

== Track listing ==
1. "Gravity's Rainbow" - 2:34
2. "Atlantis to Interzone" - 3:18
3. "4 Horsemen of 2012" - 2:29
4. "The Bouncer" - 2:14
5. "Gravity's Rainbow" (Van She Remix) - 5:24
6. "Atlantis to Interzone" (Crystal Castles Remix) - 4:12
