= Echo Collective =

Brussels-based ensemble

Echo Collective are a Brussels-based orchestral ensemble, founded by Neil Leiter and Margaret Hermant, working in the post-classical world. Echo Collective make interpretations of genres as diverse as alt.rock, synth-pop and black metal, and also create their own original music.

The ensemble was created when Margaret Hermant and Neil Leiter collaborated with Adam Wiltzie and Dustin O'Halloran's A Winged Victory For The Sullen. The American-born Leiter was introduced to Wiltzie by their mutual friend, the composer and musician Caroline Shaw.

Echo Collective Plays Amnesiac (2018) is a re-working of the Radiohead album Amnesiac.

They collaborated with Erasure to create a classical reworking of the album World Be Gone, entitled World Beyond and recorded in Brussels in November 2017, featuring seven of their performers including Margaret Hermant on violin and harp, Neil Leiter on viola, Thomas Engelin on cello, Jaroslaw Mroz on double bass, Gart de Cart on piano and Antoine Dandoy on vibraphone and Glockenspiel.

12 Conversations with Thilo Heinzmann (2019) is an album of reworked music by Jóhann Jóhannsson, in line with Jóhannsson's wishes. The suite is inspired by the work of the German abstract painter Thilo Heinzmann.

The Sea Within (2020) is an album of Echo Collective's original music.

== Discography ==
=== Albums ===
- Echo Collective Plays Amnesiac (2018)
- 12 Conversations with Thilo Heinzmann (Deustche Grammophon, 2019) – music by Jóhann Jóhannsson
- The Sea Within (7K!, 2020)

=== Contributions to albums ===
- Colours. Reflect. Time. Loss. (2019) by Maps
