= Pillowface and His Airplane Chronicles =

Mixtape by Steve Aoki
- Released: January 22, 2008
- Genres: Indie rock, electronic, dance, rock
- Length: 54:17
- Label: Thrive Records
- Producer: Steve Aoki

Professional ratings
Review scores
| Source | Rating |
|---|---|
| About.com | link |
| AbsolutePunk.net | 74% link |
| Allmusic | link |
| Obscuresound | link |

Pillowface and His Airplane Chronicles is the debut mixtape by American DJ and record producer Steve Aoki.

The mix features tracks from Justice, Peaches, Datarock, MSTRKRFT, Bloc Party, Franz Ferdinand and others, with guest vocal appearances from Santigold, Spank Rock, Uffie, Kid Sister, Pase Rock, Amanda Blank and Mickey Avalon.

The album debuted at number 15 on the Billboard Dance/Electronic Albums chart.

== Background ==
Aoki explained that there is a meaning behind the album name. Pillowface is an alter ego of Aoki. He is "traveling and surviving with no sleep – practically, no sleep for weeks, yet still being able to function. His head turns into a pillow. Airplane Chronicles – we're just traveling, living in airports and going global. That's part of what glues all this music and all these artists together. There's artists from Sweden, to New York, to Paris, to Los Angeles to, everywhere, all kind of coming together for this one."

== Reception ==
The response to Pillowface and His Airplane Chronicles was generally mixed to negative.

== Track listing ==
1. Refused "New Noise" (1:55) (Jon Brannstrom; Dennis Lyxzen; David Sandstrom; Kristopher Steen)
2. Justice "Waters Of Nazareth" (Erol Alkan's Durrr Durrr Durrrrrr Re-Edit) w/ Pase Rock's Guest Drop (2:22) (Gaspard Augé; Xavier de Rosnay)
3. Does It Offend You, Yeah? "We Are Rockstars" w/ Spank Rock & Amanda Blank's Guest Drop (2:00) (James Rushent; Dan Coop; Rob Bloomfield; Matty Derham)
4. Services "Element Of Danger" (MSTRKRFT Remix) W/ Har Mar Superstar's Guest Drop (3:14) (Tristan Bechet; Christopher Pravdica)
5. Goose "Bring it On" w/ Todd Fink's Guest Drop (3:45) (Mickael Karkousse; Dave Martijn; Tom Coghe; Bert Libeert)
6. Larry Tee & Princess Superstar "Licky (Work It Out)"(Herve Goes Low Remix) w/ Santogold's Guest Drop (3:35)(Lawrence Thom; Concetta Kirschner)
7. Green Velvet "Shake and Pop" w/ Kid Sister's Guest Drop (3:10) (Curtis Jones; Walter Phillips)
8. Klaxons "Gravity's Rainbow" (Soulwax Remix) (5:04) (Jamie Reynolds; James Righton; Simon Taylor-Davies)
9. Mystery Jets "The Boy Who Ran Away" (Riton Re-Dub) (2:50) (Blaine Harrison; Henry Harrison; Kai Fish; Kapil Trivedi; William Rees)
10. Peaches "Boys Wanna Be Her" (Weird Science Remix) (2:03) (Merrill Beth Nisker)
11. Datarock "Fa-Fa-Fa" w/ Steve Bays' Guest Drop (3:30) (Fredrik Saroea; Ketil Mosnes)
12. Yelle "Je Veux te Voir" (3:33) (Jean-Francois Perrier; Julie Budet)
13. Franz Ferdinand "Do You Want To" (Erol Alkan's Glam Racket Remix) (2:50) (Alex Kapranos; Nick McCarthy; Robert Hardy; Paul Thomson)
14. Kim "Wet 'N Wild" w/ Mickey Avalon's Guest Drop (2:32) (Kimberly Isaac)
15. Bloc Party "Helicopter" (Weird Science Remix feat. Peaches) (4:22) (Kele Okereke; Russell Lissack; Gordon Moakes; Matt Tong)
16. Justice "D.A.N.C.E." (MSTRKRFT Remix) (4:20) (Gaspard Augé; Xavier de Rosnay)
17. Scanners "Low Life" Remix w/ Uffie's Guest Drop (5:52) (Matthew Mole; Sarah Daly)

== Charts ==
| Chart (2008) | Peak position |
|---|---|
| US Dance/Electronic Albums | 8 |
