= A Bugged Out Mix by Klaxons =

Compilation album by Klaxons
- Released: 1 October 2007
- Length: 53:35
- Label: New State Music

Klaxons chronology
Myths of the Near Future (2007)	A Bugged Out Mix by Klaxons (2007)	Surfing the Void (2010)

A Bugged Out Mix by Klaxons is a compilation album compiled by British dance-punk band Klaxons.

== Track listing ==
Source: Amazon

No.	Title	Artist	Length
1.	"Breakbeat Metal Music"	Luke Vibert
2.	"Tasty"	The L Bit
3.	"Butterfly"	Pedro Campos
4.	"Shooting Tigers" (Play Paul Remix)	Markus Lange & Daniel Dexter
5.	"Artology" (Destillat Remix)	Johannes Heil
6.	"Dry"	Overnoise
7.	"Breaking Bones"	Blende
8.	"Ride Baby Ride"	Friendly
9.	"Audiotonique"	Da BoogieBoys
10.	"It Doesn't Matter"	The Chemical Brothers
11.	"Stress"	Justice
12.	"Moon Unit Part 1"	Mogg & Naudascher
13.	"It's Not Over Yet" (Brodinski Remix; incl. Aleister Crowley – 666)	Klaxons

Disc Two
No.	Title	Artist	Length
1.	"In the Year 2525"	Zager & Evans
2.	"Shame on a Nigga"	Wu-Tang Clan
3.	"King of the Flies"	Fad Gadget
4.	"They Don't Want Your Corn, They Want Your Kids"	Liars
5.	"The Garden of Earthly Delights"	The United States of America
6.	"Sorry for Laughing"	Josef K
7.	"I'm Not a Juvenile Delinquent 'Rock, Rock, Rock'"	Frankie Lymon & The Teenagers
8.	"Zen Archer" (The first 4 minutes, uncredited, feature the song Flashback Caruso from the album The Faust Tapes by the band Faust)	Todd Rundgren
9.	"The Night"	Frankie Valli and the Four Seasons
10.	"Caramel"	Cluster
11.	"For Kate I Wait"	Ariel Pink's Haunted Graffiti
12.	"Me, White Noise"	Blur
13.	"We Blame Chicago"	90 Day Men
14.	"It's Over"	Roy Orbison
