= A Bugged Out Mix =

A Bugged Out Mix may refer to:

- A Bugged Out Mix (Felix da Housecat album)
- A Bugged Out Mix (Miss Kittin album)
- A Bugged Out Mix by Klaxons, an album by Klaxons
