= Turning the Mind =

Studio album by Maps
- Released: 28 September 2009 (Europe); 20 October 2009 (North America)
- Genres: Electropop, dream pop
- Length: 59:28
- Label: Mute Records

Maps chronology
We Can Create (2007)	Turning the Mind (2009)	Vicissitude (2013)

Singles from Turning the Mind
- 1. "Let Go of the Fear" Released: 11 May 2009; 2. "I Dream of Crystal" Released: 14 September 2009; 3. "Die Happy, Die Smiling" Released: 10 January 2010

Professional ratings
Review scores
Source	Rating
Allmusic	link
Clash	9/10 stars
Drowned in Sound	link
The Guardian	link
Metro	4/5 stars
musicOMH.com	link
NME	link
Slant	link
The Mirror	4/5 stars
The Sun	4.5/5 stars

Turning the Mind is the second album from Northampton-based band Maps, released in 2009.

== Album information ==
On 22 February 2009 James wrote on his MySpace blog about his new upcoming album, saying "I've never been more confident and excited about this new album". In an interview he posted on the same blog, he mentioned the new album's themes as being "mental states" and "chemicals".

According to an interview on James' new website for Maps, he said Turning the Mind would be darker, angrier and more electronic than his previous album We Can Create. Every two weeks, James posted a song from Turning the Mind onto his MySpace page.

On 11 August the track "Nothing" was uploaded to YouTube accompanied by an unofficial music video.

Turning the Mind was released on 28 September in Europe and 20 October in North America.

The album title track, "Turning the Mind", was featured in the 2010 British film Chatroom.

== Track listing ==
All tracks are written by James Chapman.

No.	Title	Length
1.	"Turning the Mind"	5:58
2.	"I Dream of Crystal"	5:26
3.	"Let Go of the Fear"	4:51
4.	"Valium in the Sunshine"	4:23
5.	"Papercuts"	4:03
6.	"Love Will Come"	5:15
7.	"Everything is Shattering"	5:53
8.	"Nothing"	5:03
9.	"The Note (These Voices)"	4:08
10.	"Chemeleon"	5:16
11.	"Die Happy, Die Smiling"	5:24
12.	"Without You"	3:59
13.	"From Here's to Bliss" (iTunes bonus track)	5:55

== Singles ==
- "Let Go of the Fear": 11 May 2009
- "I Dream of Crystal": 14 September 2009
- "Die Happy, Die Smiling": 10 January 2010
