= Echoes (Klaxons song) =

2010 single by Klaxons

Single by Klaxons

from the album Surfing the Void
- B-side: "Sorcerer City"
- Released: 16 August 2010
- Recorded: 2009
- Genre: Indie rock; new rave; space rock
- Length: 3:37
- Label: Polydor
- Songwriter: Klaxons
- Producer: Ross Robinson

Klaxons singles chronology
"As Above, So Below" (2007)	"Echoes" (2010)	"Twin Flames" (2010)

"Echoes" is the first single by British indie rock band Klaxons from their second studio album, Surfing the Void. The song was released through Polydor Records as a digital download on 15 August 2010, with a vinyl and CD single release the following day. The single was added to BBC Radio 1's A Playlist in July 2010. The single cover was shot by London-based photographer Ben Rayner. The song appears on Need for Speed: Hot Pursuit in 2010 along with the song "Twin Flames".

== Music video ==
The music video to accompany the release of "Echoes" premiered on Channel 4 at 12:25 am on 17 July 2010 as part of a 4Music exclusive. It was then released on YouTube later that day from the band's record label YouTube page. The video features the band performing the song in the White Desert in Farafra, Egypt.

== Track listing ==
- CD single

No.	Title	Length
1.	"Echoes"	3:52
2.	"Sorcerer City"	3:09

- 7" single

No.	Title	Length
1.	"Echoes"	3:52
2.	"Birdman"	3:17

== Charts ==
Chart performance for "Echoes"
Chart (2010)	Peak position
Australia (ARIA)	95
Belgium (Ultratip Bubbling Under Flanders)	22
Belgium (Ultratip Bubbling Under Wallonia)	20
UK Singles (Official Charts)	55

== Release history ==
Region	Date	Format
United Kingdom	15 August 2010	Digital Download
United Kingdom	16 August 2010	CD single
United Kingdom	16 August 2010	Vinyl
