= Vicissitude =

Studio album by Maps
- Released: 9 July 2013
- Genres: Electropop, synthpop, dream pop
- Length: 53:52
- Label: Mute
- Producer: James Chapman

Maps chronology
Turning the Mind (2009)	Vicissitude (2013)	Colours. Reflect. Time. Loss. (2019)

Singles from Vicissitude
- 1. "A.M.A" Released: 21 June 2013; 2. "You Will Find A Way" Released: 14 October 2013

Professional ratings
Aggregate scores
Source	Rating
Metacritic	63/100
Review scores
Source	Rating
Allmusic	3.5/5 stars

Vicissitude is the third studio album by English electronic musician Maps. It was released in July 2013 under Mute Records. The single "A.M.A." features Norwegian singer-songwriter Susanne Sundfør.

== Track list ==
All tracks are written by James Chapman (Maps).

No.	Title	Length
1.	"A.M.A."	4:29
2.	"Built to Last"	6:13
3.	"You Will Find a Way"	6:17
4.	"I Heard Them Say"	4:28
5.	"Nicholas"	6:36
6.	"Vicissitude"	3:38
7.	"Left Behind"	5:08
8.	"This Summer"	5:04
9.	"Insignificant Others"	5:55
10.	"Adjusted to the Darkness"	6:06

iTunes Deluxe Edition
No.	Title	Length
11.	"As I Can See"	5:54

== Singles ==
- "A.M.A.": June 24, 2013
