= Colours. Reflect. Time. Loss. =

Studio album by Maps
- Released: 1 May 2019
- Length: 48:02
- Label: Mute

Maps chronology
Vicissitude (2013)	Colours. Reflect. Time. Loss. (2019)

Singles from Colours. Reflect. Time. Loss.
- 1. "Both Sides" Released: 28 February 2019; 2. "Surveil" Released: 2 May 2019

Professional ratings
Aggregate scores
Source	Rating
Metacritic	80/100
Review scores
Source	Rating
AllMusic	4/5 stars
MusicOMH	4/5 stars
NME	3/5 stars

Colours. Reflect. Time. Loss. is the fourth studio album by English electronic musician Maps. It was released on 10 May 2019 through Mute Records. The album was recorded live with other vocalists, drummers and the classical ensemble Echo Collective.

== Critical reception ==
Colours. Reflect. Time. Loss. was met with generally favourable reviews from critics. At Metacritic, which assigns a weighted average rating out of 100 to reviews from mainstream publications, this release received an average score of 80, based on 5 reviews.

== Track listing ==
No.	Title	Length
1.	"Surveil"	4:16
2.	"Both Sides"	4:32
3.	"Howl Around"	4:33
4.	"Wildfire"	5:35
5.	"Just Reflecting"	5:43
6.	"She Sang to Me"	4:14
7.	"Sophia"	6:38
8.	"The Plans We Made"	4:05
9.	"New Star"	3:58
10.	"You Exist in Everything"	4:28

== Charts ==
Chart	Peak position
UK Independent Albums (Official Charts)	42
