= Twin Flames (song) =

Single by Klaxons

from the album Surfing the Void
- Released: 25 October 2010
- Recorded: 2009
- Genre: Indie rock; new rave
- Length: 4:19
- Label: Polydor
- Songwriter: Klaxons
- Producer: Ross Robinson

Klaxons singles chronology
"Echoes" (2010)	"Twin Flames" (2010)

"Twin Flames" is the second single to be taken from British indie rock band Klaxons' second studio album, Surfing the Void. The song was released on 25 October 2010, ahead of their upcoming UK tour. The song appeared on Need for Speed: Hot Pursuit in 2010, along with the song "Echoes".

== Music video ==
A music video for the song debuted in November 2010. It is notable for its extensive nudity. The band members are involved in an orgy with several women. As the video progresses, their body parts begin to fuse. Directed by Saam Farahmand and inspired by the horror film Society, the video is notable for its use of motion control rigs and computer blending to create a surrealistic visual effect.
