= Love Frequency =

Studio album by Klaxons
- Released: 16 June 2014
- Genre: Indietronica, electronica, dance-pop, new rave
- Length: 46:10
- Label: Red Records
- Producer: Tom Rowlands, Gorgon City, Klaxons, Erol Alkan, James Murphy

Klaxons chronology
Landmarks of Lunacy (2010)	Love Frequency (2014)

Singles from Love Frequency
- 1. "There Is No Other Time" Released: 30 March 2014; 2. "Show Me a Miracle" Released: 13 June 2014; 3. "A New Reality" Released: 17 October 2014

Professional ratings
Aggregate scores
Source	Rating
Metacritic	58/100
Review scores
Source	Rating
NME	(7/10)
Pitchfork Media	(5.1/10)

Love Frequency is the third and final studio album by English band Klaxons. It was released on 16 June 2014 under Red Records.

== Background and recording ==
In January 2012, Klaxons announced on their Twitter account that they were to begin recording their third album on 30 January. NME reported that the album was "expected to be released later" in the year and that the band were working with James Murphy and The Chemical Brothers. At Berlin Festival 2013 they played new songs "Children of the Sun", "Invisible Forces", "Love Frequency", "Rhythm of Life" and "New Reality" which were released on their 2014 album.

The album's lead single "There is No Other Time" is a collaboration with British production duo Gorgon City, and was premiered on Zane Lowe's BBC Radio 1 show on 3 February 2014, then becoming Radio 1's Track Of The Day the following day. Along with "Children Of The Sun", produced by Tom Rowlands of The Chemical Brothers, the AA-side single was released on 30 March 2014, followed by a four-date UK tour. On 10 February, "Children Of The Sun", was premiered on Steve Lamacq's BBC Radio 6 show.[60] "There is No Other Time" entered the UK Singles Chart at number 42. Their third album, Love Frequency, was released on 16 June 2014. It entered the UK charts at number 38.

In October 2014 the band announced that their dates in the UK and Europe through October/November and Japan/South America in January 2015 would be their "last headline tour". The band's publicist was unable to confirm whether this meant the band were splitting up or not.

In June 2022, Righton was asked by NME if there was any chance of a Klaxons reunion. "No, I think that was such a fun, amazing thing we did," he replied. "I've so much love and respect for the other guys and never say never, but I think we did all right. We've had big offers for reunions through for years now, but it's not as easy as that or something I'd go lightly into."

== Track list ==
No.	Title	Length
1.	"A New Reality"	4:27
2.	"There Is No Other Time"	3:36
3.	"Show Me a Miracle"	3:25
4.	"Out of the Dark"	4:50
5.	"Children of the Sun"	3:56
6.	"Invisible Forces"	3:42
7.	"Rhythm of Life"	5:28
8.	"Liquid Light"	3:06
9.	"The Dreamers"	4:30
10.	"Atom to Atom"	4:33
11.	"Love Frequency"	4:37

== Charts ==
Chart (2014)	Peak position
Belgian Albums (Ultratop Flanders)	159
Belgian Albums (Ultratop Wallonia)	86
French Albums (SNEP)	160
Japanese Albums (Oricon)	103
UK Albums (OCC)	38
