= Surfing the Void =

Studio album by Klaxons
- Released: 23 August 2010
- Recorded: November 2009–February 2010; Los Angeles, California
- Genres: Indie rock; electronic rock; psychedelic rock; noise rock
- Length: 38:23
- Label: Polydor
- Producer: Ross Robinson

Klaxons chronology
Myths of the Near Future (2007)	Surfing the Void (2010)	Landmarks of Lunacy (2010)

Singles from Surfing the Void
- 1. "Echoes" Released: 16 August 2010; 2. "Twin Flames" Released: 25 October 2010

Surfing the Void is the second studio album by British indie rock band Klaxons, released on 23 August 2010 through Polydor Records. The album was produced by Ross Robinson, and was recorded in Los Angeles, California. The album was preceded by lead single "Echoes" on 16 August.

Following the release of the band's Mercury Prize-winning debut Myths of the Near Future in 2007, Klaxons began working on their second effort the following year. The band returned to working with original producer James Ford, aiming for release in early 2009. In March 2009, it was reported that the band had been told to re-record parts of their second album, with initial efforts rejected by Polydor for being "too experimental for release". The album was eventually recorded between November 2009 and February 2010 with producer Ross Robinson.

Surfing the Void reached number ten on the UK Albums Chart, as well as multiple charts worldwide. The album marked Klaxons' first entry into the Australian market at the time, debuting at number 15 on the ARIA Charts. Critical reception to the album was generally favourable, with many reviewers commenting on the band's progression from their debut.

== Production and recording ==
In July 2007, bassist and vocalist Jamie Reynolds stated that the band were to begin writing parts of their second album individually, aiming to compile at the conclusion of their then-current touring schedule. Reynolds would go on to describe the work as a "prog doom" album. Later in the year during the band's November–December tour of the United Kingdom, Simon Taylor-Davis told NME that the band were currently playing an untitled prog track during soundcheck. Later in the year, the band confirmed they were heading to France to record with James Ford, aiming to be completed by Christmas for release in early 2009.

In March 2009, it was reported that the band had been told to re-record parts of their second album, after it was rejected by label Polydor. Reynolds said that "...we've made a really dense, psychedelic record" and that "it isn't the right thing for us [the band]". In an interview with BBC News, Reynolds revealed that "Moonhead" and new track "Marble Fields and the Hydrolight Head of Delusion" were "probably going to make it", and that they were working with "Simian Mobile Disco production" during April–May 2009. Reynolds added that "Valley of the Calm Trees" had been retitled "The Parhelion", to reflect its lyrical content. James Ford - of Simian Mobile Disco - confirmed working with the band later in the year, stating in an interview with Newsbeat that they were "...trying to keep it melodic and vocal because that's one of their great strong points".

It was announced during November 2009 that the band were now working with producer Ross Robinson, with Robinson confirming through his Twitter account. The band stated that work with Ford had gone astray, reaching difficulties with Ford acting as both producer and drummer. Recording was completed to the satisfaction of both band and label in February 2010.

The band released some of the material from the original sessions on a free EP titled "Landmarks of Lunacy" via their website on 25 December 2010.

== Promotion ==
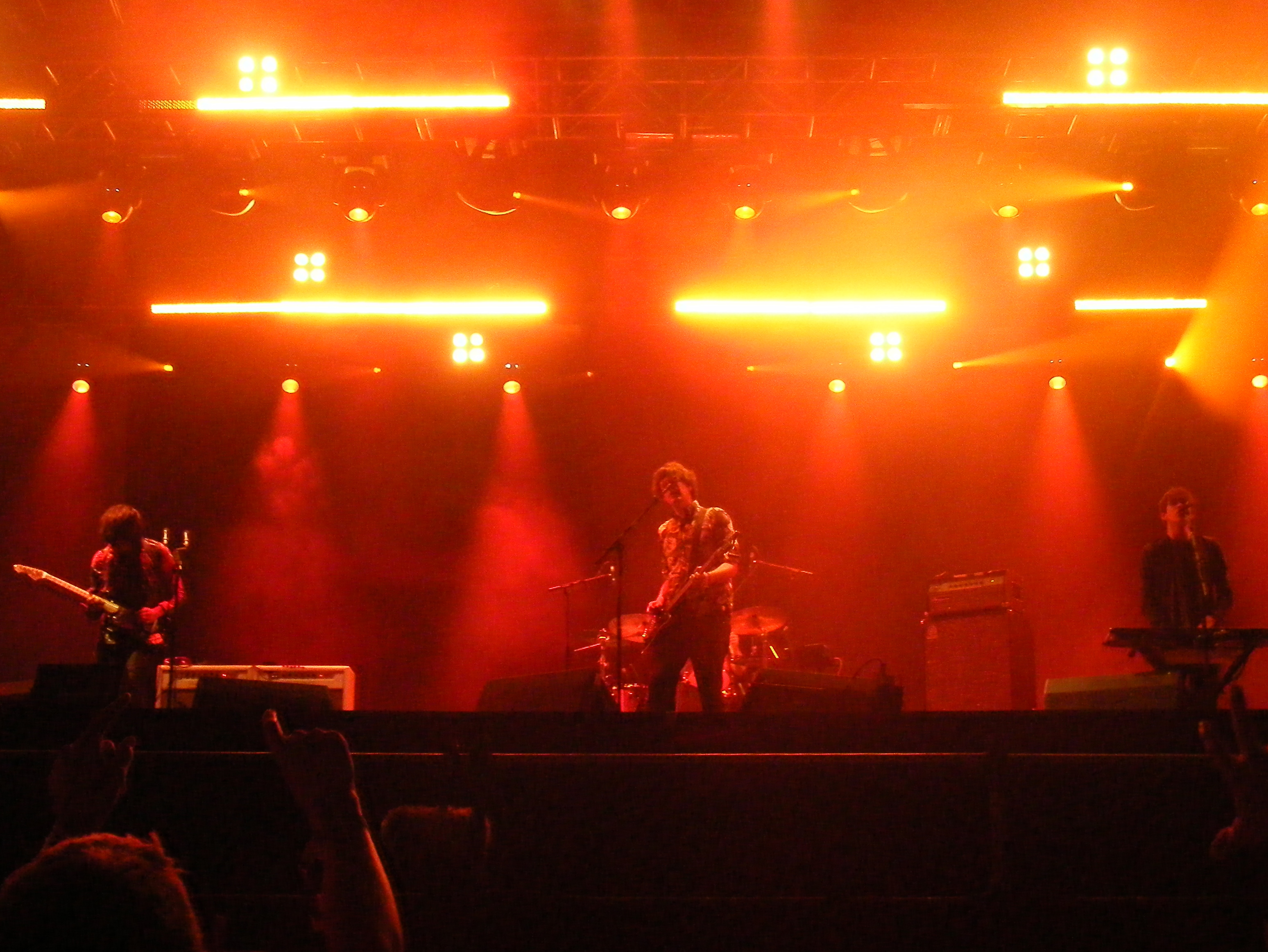
Klaxons performing at the Bestival, 12 September 2009.

In October 2008, Klaxons made their live return with a series of gigs in Europe and South America, debuting new tracks "Valley of the Calm Trees" and "Moonhead". These were the band's first performances since NME's Big Gig eight months prior. The band would then join Modular Records's NeverEverLand festival, which toured Australia throughout December 2008. The band made their live return to the United Kingdom at the beginning of 2009, playing a small club show at Madame Jojo's in London. During the set, the band featured new songs "Imaginary Pleasures" and "In Silver Forest", together with the previously aired "Moonhead" and "Valley of the Calm Trees".

On 22 May 2009, the band announced a one-off show at Coventry's Kasbah nightclub, their only scheduled headline UK performance. The concert, to take place on June 3, sparked rumours that the band may feature at the 2009 Glastonbury Festival. The band supported Blur at their comeback show at the Manchester Evening News Arena on June 26, before playing a surprise set at Glastonbury the following day. The set included further new songs "Hoodoo Bora", "Future Memory" and "Echoes". In addition to Glastonbury, the band featured at numerous other festivals including Bestival, Ibiza Rocks, and headlined the Croatian Hartera festival. In June 2009, Klaxons announced that the release date of the album had been pushed back to early 2010, with Reynolds stating: "We'd really like to put out the first great record of the 2010s rather than the last great one of this decade."

In March 2010, it was confirmed that the band would be playing Open'er Festival in Poland as well as the Reading and Leeds Festivals in the United Kingdom, where they are to headline the BBC Radio 1/NME Stage. Taylor-Davies suggested Reading and Leeds would be a UK-exclusive, saying "I think in England it's just going to be Reading and Leeds, in terms of festivals, this summer". The band have also announced an eight date tour of the United Kingdom and France in support of the new album, taking place during May–July 2010. For live performances, they are to be joined by Anthony Rossomando (formerly of Dirty Pretty Things) as a touring member. Further festival performances include Spain's Benicàssim Festival, Pohoda in Slovakia, and EXIT in Serbia.

== Artwork ==
After a boozy night out with myself, Richard Robinson, Jamie Reynolds and new live band member Anthony Rossamondo [..] our attention focused on firstly a fictional record for Richard and then on the new Klaxons sleeve. Before long we were looking at random pictures of cats in spacesuits and laughed at how striking a massive billboard would look, and that was the beginning! [..] the label hired a real space suit from the US, Richard designed flags and badges to complete the picture. All that was left was to get Jamie's cat in the spotlight and hope he was up to the task…. We couldn't have asked for more, he was a true pro and we sent the backup cats home!

— Mads Perch, Photographer

In January 2011 it was announced that the cover had won a prize for the best album artwork of 2010.

== Release ==
The album's title was revealed on 25 May 2010. Zane Lowe premiered the promotional track "Flashover" on BBC Radio 1, naming the track his "Hottest Record in the World" for 25 May 2010. From 8pm the same day, the track was made available to listen to from the band's website. The album's first official single was announced as "Echoes", which was released on 16 August 2010. The track peaked at number 55 on the UK Singles Chart. Surfing the Void entered the UK Albums Chart upon its release, peaking at number ten in the week beginning 29 August 2010. Worldwide, the album reached number fifteen in the Australian ARIA Charts, as well charting on the Irish, Swiss and Belgian (Wallonia) Album Charts. Second single "Twin Flames" was released on 25 October 2010.

== Reception ==
Professional ratings
Review scores
Source	Rating
AllMusic	3/5 stars
BBC	(positive)
Clash	8/10
Drowned in Sound	7/10
The Guardian	3/5 stars
musicOMH	3.5/5 stars
NME	8/10
PopMatters	8/10
Pitchfork Media	7.2/10
Q	4/5 stars

Media response to Surfing the Void was generally favourable, with many professional reviews commented on the band's progression from their debut album. Aggregating website Metacritic reported a normalised rating of 68, based on thirteen positive and ten mixed critical reviews, indicating generally favorable reviews. Dorian Lynskey of The Guardian awarded the album three stars out of five, applauding the band's efforts to stand out from conventional indie music. BBC reviewer Andy Fyfe noted the band's move away from their new rave labelling, comparing the band favourably to The Prodigy and Depeche Mode. In December 2010, Hot Press noted: "Despite being an excellent collection of catchy psych-rock tunes, the record's tortured creation [...] did [Klaxons] no favours and there was a feeling of anti-climax when it finally surfaced late this summer."

== Track listing ==
All songs composed by Simon Taylor-Davies, James Righton and Jamie Reynolds, except where noted.

No.	Title	Length
1.	"Echoes"	3:45
2.	"The Same Space"	3:11
3.	"Surfing the Void"	2:30
4.	"Valley of the Calm Trees" (Simon Taylor-Davies/James Righton/Jamie Reynolds/Steffan Halperin)	3:16
5.	"Venusia"	4:08
6.	"Extra Astronomical"	3:17
7.	"Twin Flames"	4:19
8.	"Flashover" (Simon Taylor-Davies/James Righton/Jamie Reynolds/Steffan Halperin)	5:07
9.	"Future Memories"	3:42
10.	"Cypherspeed"	5:08

iTunes bonus tracks
No.	Title	Length
11.	"Echoes (Video)"

== Charts ==
Chart (2010)	Peak position
Australian Albums (ARIA)	15
Belgian Albums (Ultratop Flanders)	66
Belgian Albums (Ultratop Wallonia)	33
French Albums (SNEP)	51
Greek Albums (IFPI)	20
Scottish Albums (Official Charts)	18
Swiss Albums (Schweizer Hitparade)	31
Japanese Albums (Oricon)	17
UK Albums (Official Charts)	10
US Heatseekers Albums (Billboard)	49
