= Sweethearts on Parade =

Sweethearts on Parade may refer to:

- Sweethearts on Parade (1930 film), American musical comedy
- Sweethearts on Parade (1944 film) or Sweethearts of the U.S.A., American musical comedy
- Sweethearts on Parade (1953 film), American drama
- "Sweethearts on Parade", 1928 jazz standard by Carmen Lombardo
- Sweethearts on Parade, Australian pop group founded in 1969 with Cathy Wayne on lead vocals
