= Sweethearts (group) =

- The Sweethearts Foundation Inc.
- Formation: 1989; 37 years ago
- Headquarters: Matthew Flinders Girls Secondary College
- Founder: Ross Lipson
- Website: http://sweethearts.com.au

Sweethearts is a school music group founded in Geelong, Australia in 1989 who play new soul – a fusion of styles based around classic soul and Motown. They have an international following and have played concerts at several large music festivals.

== History ==
The Sweethearts began at Matthew Flinders Girls Secondary College under the direction of Ross Lipson, initially as a social band for teachers and students in Years 10-12 of high school. Lipson was a science and instrumental teacher at the school, who with colleagues from the music department, decided to form a group to play jazz standards and soul music. Word of mouth spread and they began to book gigs.

The Sweethearts Foundation was formed in 2000 as a not-for-profit organisation to support the Sweethearts program and band. In 2005, Lipson and his colleague Rick McLean transformed the group into a two-year Certificate IV course in music after being given professional development time by the Education Department. It was said to be the highest industry-based qualification offered by any Australian school in 2013. A separate Sweethearts Music Academy was formed in 2012 to provide mentoring and training for musicians aged 8–13.

Sweethearts were the subject of a 2013 multi-part documentary Heart and Soul on the Australian ABC3 television network. Filmed over almost two years, the documentary followed the girls touring internationally while managing their school work. A second series of Heart and Soul featuring The Sweethearts was produced in 2015 and was nominated for a 2015 International Kid's Emmy.

The group have performed at the Queenscliff Music Festival, Porretta Soul Festival, Montreux Jazz Festival, and Jazz à Vienne, and have had air play on Australia's national radio network Triple J with their song "Secret".

The Sweethearts Foundation also founded Sweetfest, a musical festival held in Geelong celebrating female musicians. The free annual festival began in 2018 and returned in 2022 after not being held for two years.

In 2014 Lipson died of cancer. The Sweethearts Foundation and Queenscliff Music Festival founded the Ross Lipson Award in his honour to recognise excellence in local female musicians. The current music director is Michael Fitzgerald.

== Discography ==
- Red in Your Eyes (2012)
- Bar Roma (2013)
- Heart and Soul (2015)
- Four Leaf Clover (2016)
- Don't Feel Yourself (2019)
