= Magick (Klaxons song) =

2006 single by Klaxons

Single by Klaxons

from the album Myths of the Near Future
- Released: 30 October 2006
- Recorded: 2006
- Length: 3:38
- Label: Polydor Records
- Songwriter(s): Jamie Reynolds, James Righton, Simon Taylor-Davis
- Producer(s): James Ford

Klaxons singles chronology
"Atlantis to Interzone" (2006)	"Magick" (2006)	"Golden Skans" (2007)

"Magick" is a song released by London band Klaxons on 30 October 2006. It reached #29 in the UK Singles Chart, released on 5 November. It is also taken from their album Myths of the Near Future, which was released on 29 January 2007.

The track is a reference to British occultist Aleister Crowley citing parts of spells written by him and other related matters such as the Hermetic Order of the Golden Dawn. The song is also part of the soundtrack of the third season of the British television series "Skins".

== Track listing ==
CD single

1. "Magick" – 3:38
2. "Hall of Records" – 2:53
3. "Magick" (Simian Mobile Disco Mix) – 7:20

7" vinyl

1. "Magick" – 3:38
2. "Hall of Records" – 2:53

12" vinyl

1. "Magick" (Simian Mobile Disco Mix) – 7:20
