= Landmarks of Lunacy =

EP by Klaxons
- Released: 25 December 2010
- Recorded: 2008
- Genres: Alternative rock, neo-psychedelia
- Label: Self-released

Klaxons chronology
Surfing the Void (2010)	Landmarks of Lunacy (2010)	Love Frequency (2014)

Professional ratings
Review scores
Source	Rating
AbsolutePunk	86%
Pitchfork	(5.7/10)

Landmarks of Lunacy is the second extended play (EP) by British indie rock band Klaxons. Released on 25 December 2010, the album was available for free download in their official website. The songs were rejected by their record label, Polydor, after the recording sessions for the second album, when they were deemed "too experimental."

== Track listing ==
1. "The Pale Blue Dot" - 4:05
2. "Silver Forest" - 3:29
3. "Ivy Leaves" - 3:29
4. "Wildeflowers" - 4:03
5. "Marble Fields" - 7:19
