= Golden Skans =

2007 single by Klaxons

Single by Klaxons

from the album Myths of the Near Future
- B-side: "Hall of Records"; "Magick" (remix); "The Bouncer" (live); "Atlantis to Interzone" (live)
- Released: 22 January 2007
- Genre: Indie-funk
- Length: 2:45
- Label: Rinse; Polydor
- Songwriters: James Righton; Jamie Reynolds; Simon Taylor Davis
- Producer: James Ford

Klaxons singles chronology
"Magick" (2006)	"Golden Skans" (2007)	"Gravity's Rainbow" (2007)

"Golden Skans" is a song released by London band Klaxons on 22 January 2007, taken from their first album Myths of the Near Future, which was released on 29 January 2007. The song reached number 16 in the UK Singles Chart on download sales on 14 January (two weeks before the release of the CD) and climbed to number 14 the next week, eventually reaching number seven after the CD release. It was a minor hit in Belgium, charting on the Ultratip charts of both Flanders and Wallonia. The track was also released on French label Ed Banger Records as a French-exclusive remix EP.

In May 2007, NME magazine placed "Golden Skans" at number 40 on its list of the "50 Greatest Indie Anthems Ever". In December 2007, NME voted "Golden Skans" as the best NME single of the year in 2007; furthermore, their debut album was the NME album of the year. In October 2011, NME placed it at number 97 on its list "150 Best Tracks of the Past 15 Years".

== Background ==
According to a radio interview with the Klaxons, the name "Golden Skans" is derived from Clay Paky's Golden Scan stage lighting fixture.

== Music video ==
The song's music video, directed by Saam Farahmand, is heavily influenced by "Can You Feel It" by the Jacksons. It features a message at the beginning very similar to the words spoken by the narrator in the "Can You Feel It" video. It also features other elements from the Jacksons' video including an inventive and contemporary use of light and dark with all three band members represented as light particles wearing different coloured ribbons, destroying certain shapes and moving dramatically to the music.

== Track listings ==
- CD 1 (RINSE002CD)
1. "Golden Skans"
2. "Golden Skans" (Erol Alkan's Ekstra Spektral edit)
- CD 2 (1720646CD)
1. "Golden Skans"
2. "Hall of Records"
3. "Golden Skans" (Erol Alkans remix)
4. "Magick" (Simian Mobile Disco remix)
- 7-inch single 1 (RINSE002S)
1. "Golden Skans" (live in Manchester)
2. "The Bouncer" (live in Manchester)
- 7-inch single 2 (RINSE002SX)
1. "Golden Skans"
2. "Atlantis to Interzone" (live in Manchester)

== Charts ==
=== Weekly charts ===
Chart (2007)	Peak position
Belgium (Ultratip Bubbling Under Flanders)	11
Belgium (Ultratip Bubbling Under Wallonia)	17
European Hot 100 Singles (Billboard)	28
Scottish Singles Sales (Official Charts)	6
Switzerland Airplay (Schweizer Hitparade)	81
UK Singles (Official Charts)	7

=== Year-end charts ===
Chart (2007)	Position
UK Singles (OCC)	78

== Certifications ==
Region	Certification	Certified units/sales
United Kingdom (BPI)	Platinum	600,000^{‡}
^{‡} Sales+streaming figures based on certification alone.

== Covers ==
The song has been covered on BBC Radio 1's Live Lounge on different occasions by both Mark Ronson and Kaiser Chiefs. In 2010, the Portuguese band Clã made a cover for a national radio show called "3 Pistas" (3 Tracks). Since then, they released a video clip for the song.

== In popular culture ==
An instrumental remix of the song has featured in the background of television trails for Brothers & Sisters on Channel 4, for BBC shows The Restaurant and Waterloo Road, and for ITV's Emmerdale, all in 2007.

The song is featured on the soundtrack of Gran Turismo 5 Prologue.

The song has also been used on an ad for Garnier Fructis. In 2012, the song was used for the TV advertisement of Slovakia's 15th anniversary of Orange mobile network operator.
