= Robin Hill Country Park =

Adventure park in Downend, Isle of Wight

- Interactive map of Robin Hill Country Park
- Location: Downend, Isle of Wight, United Kingdom
- Coordinates: 50°41′16″N 1°14′37″W
- Opened: 1971
- Owner: Robin Hill Partnership Limited
- Theme: Countryside
- Operating season: April - November
- Area: 88-acre (0.36 km^{2})
- Website: Official website

Robin Hill Country Park is an 88-acre (36 ha) adventure park located in Downend; outside Newport, Isle of Wight. The park is built on the buried farmstead of Combley Roman Villa, which is featured in the 'Romans at Robin Hill' exhibition when at the park. Robin Hill is also noted for wildlife, particularly the red squirrels.

The park has cafés, ice creams and snack kiosks, a gift shop and a car park.

== History ==
The park was owned by the Dabell family, who also own Blackgang Chine; another Isle of Wight amusement Park located in Ventnor on the Isle of Wight. On 2 October 2023, the Dabell family announced that the park was being put up for sale, citing financial difficulties due to the ongoing cost of living crisis, as well as a hope that the funds from the sale of the park could be reinvested into the further development of Blackgang Chine.

On 31 July 2024, it was confirmed that the park had been bought by Robin Hill Partnership Limited, headed by local businessman Lee Priddle. It was confirmed that the park would pivot to become an adventure park rather than theme park and would add new attractions when re-opened fully in 2025.

== Park attractions ==
Under the Dabell family, the park owners claimed to place less emphasis on thrill seeking rides and more upon rides which fit into its 'countryside ethos'. Current attractions include:

- Toboggan Run: A 300-metre twisting and turning alpine slide of metal half-pipe.
- Wooden Maze: A large wooden maze with a centre and bridge.
- Tree Top Trail: A Children's Play area trail surrounded by trees close to the café.
- Troll Island Bridges: Bridges leading to several islands over a carp-filled pond.
- Carp Quay: A large lake with fish food available to buy and feed the fish living there.
- Duckdown Play Village: A small child-sized village.
- Run Rabbit: Various large underground rabbit tunnels. (closed)
- Activity Course: An activity course with various equipment including a zip wire and scramble net. Located in Toboggan Valley
- Snake and Hillbilly Slides: An area with slides set into the hillside.
- Splash Attack: game with buttons to press and fire water jets.
- Tot's Play: A special area designated for very young visitors which is located next to the Toboggan.
- Squirrel Tower: A tall tower themed around the island's red squirrels. Links with the Canopy Skywalk.
- African Adventure: Adventure playground, themed as an African village.
- Canopy Skywalk: A walk-along attraction which is 10 metres high and links with the Squirrel tower.
- The Parting: A sunken walk way through a pond.
- Woodland Walks.
- Falconry: 3 Daily displays.
- The Ripple: 20m water pillow.

New attractions announced for 2025 include mini diggers, climbing boulders, indoor ice rink, boat safari, tubing slides, slide adventure area, underground adventure tunnels, play structures, mini net adventures, water jump pillows and crazy golf.

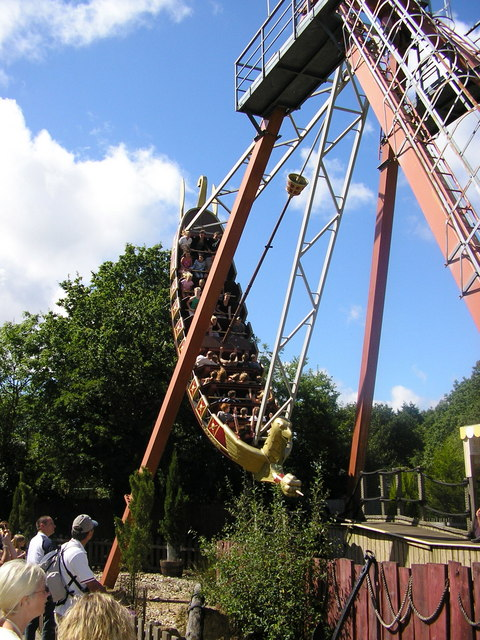
Former attraction, The Colossus

Former attractions include:

- Colossus: A swinging galleon boat ride (moved to Blackgang Chine and renamed as The Jolly Roger)
- 4D Motion Cinema (formerly the Time Machine): A 28-seat motion platform simulator (removed)
- The Ripple: 20m water pillow (moved to Blackgang Chine)
- Cows Express Junior Train Ride: A small train style ride. (removed and moving to Blackgang Chine in 2026)

== Events ==
The park was the location for the annual Bestival music festival between 2004 and 2016 before it relocated to Lulworth Estate. The park ran its own replaced for Bestival, the boutique festival Eklectica, for 2017 and 2018 and other events held include the Woodland Sessions.

The park previously organised a number of regular events including "Electric Woods" events, which happened several times a year with different themes: 'Spirit of the Orient' for Chinese New Year at February half term, various summer holiday themes including carnival and 'Festival of Light' inspired by Diwali at October half term. Woodland Sessions. After the closure in 2023, the Fiesta of the Dead event relocated to Blackgang Chine and Polar was cancelled

In 2024, the Warrior Festival relocated to the park as the first event since reopening.
