= Atlantis to Interzone =

Single by Klaxons

from the album Myths of the Near Future
- B-side: "Four Horsemen of 2012"; Various Remixes
- Released: 12 June 2006
- Genre: Indie rock; new rave
- Length: 3:26
- Label: MEROK
- Songwriter: Klaxons
- Producer: James Ford

Klaxons singles chronology
"Gravity's Rainbow" (2006)	"Atlantis to Interzone" (2006)	"Magick" (2006)

"Atlantis to Interzone" is a song by British indie electro act Klaxons. The song references the mythical lost city of Atlantis and the short story collection Interzone by William S. Burroughs, which is itself Burroughs' concept of a "metaphorical stateless city". In October 2011, NME placed it at number 125 on its list "150 Best Tracks of the Past 15 Years".

The song has been remixed by many artists including Crystal Castles, Hadouken!, Germlin, Mr. Miyagi, Third Eye Mafia, So Me and Metronomy.

The song's music video was styled by Carri Mundane.

It has been used in a Ben 10 commercial on Cartoon Network, It also appeared on the TV Series Entourage, during the third episode of the fifth season, "The All Out Fall Out", the second episode of Misfits and featured on the soundtracks of Pro Evolution Soccer 2010 and Need for Speed: ProStreet. French electronic music duo Justice also use a sample from SO ME's remix of this song during their live shows, it can be heard on the 2008 album A Cross the Universe.

== Track listing ==
7"

1. "Atlantis to Interzone" – 3:20
2. "Four Horsemen of 2012" – 2:12

12"

1. "Atlantis to Interzone" – 3:20
2. "Atlantis to Interzone" (Nightmoves Remix) – 7:16
3. "Atlantis to Interzone" (Digitalism's Klix Klax R-R-Remix) – 4:20
4. "Atlantis to Interzone" (Dave P & Adam Sparkles' Festival Remix Extended Break) – 5:33

7" Remixes

1. "Atlantis to Interzone" (Crystal Castles Remix)" – 4:13
2. "Atlantis to Interzone" (Metronomy Remix)" – 3:22

12" Remixes

1. "Atlantis to Interzone" (Third Eye Mafia Refit)" – 5:51
2. "Atlantis to Interzone" – 3:20
3. "Atlantis to Interzone" (Ayia Napa to Interzone Tapedeck Remix)" – 4:06
4. "Atlantis to Interzone" (Germlin Remix)" – 2:27
