= Downend, Isle of Wight =

Coordinates: 50.687360°N 1.231794°W

Downend
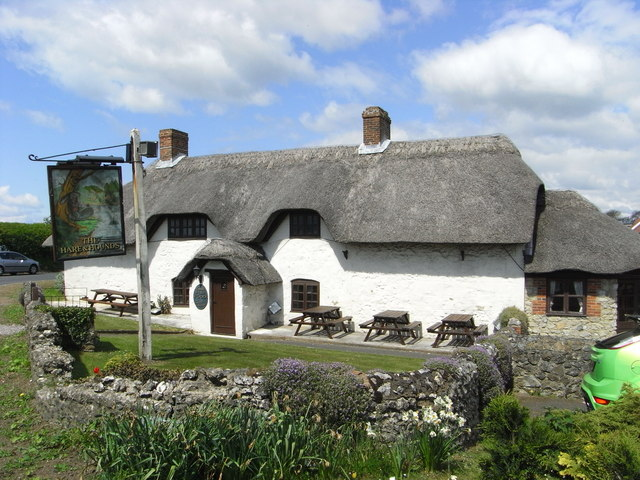
- The Hare and Hounds on Down End Road

- Location within the Isle of Wight
- OS grid reference: SZ532876
- Unitary authority: Isle of Wight
- Ceremonial county: Isle of Wight
- Region: South East
- Country: England
- Sovereign state: United Kingdom
- Post town: NEWPORT
- Postcode district: PO30
- Dialling code: 01983
- Police: Hampshire and Isle of Wight
- Fire: Hampshire and Isle of Wight
- Ambulance: Isle of Wight
- UK Parliament: Isle of Wight East

Downend is a settlement on the Isle of Wight, off the south coast of England. It is the location of the Robin Hill adventure park. According to the Post Office the population of the settlement at the 2011 Census was included in the civil parish of Arreton.

The hamlet lies to the north of the A3056 road, in the central-eastern district of the island. Downend is approximately 3 miles (4.8 km) south-east of Newport. Public transport is provided by Southern Vectis on route 8 and Wightbus on 33.

Michael Morey, accused of murdering his grandson was said to have been hanged on the island and his body displayed in a gibbet opposite the Hare and Hounds pub. His ghost is still said to walk the street with an axe on his shoulder and in place of a face is a grinning skull.
