= Gravity's Rainbow (song) =

Single by Klaxons

from the album Myths of the Near Future
- Released: 27 March 2006; 9 April 2007 (re-release)
- Genre: Electronic rock, alternative rock
- Length: 2:36
- Label: Angular
- Songwriter: Klaxons
- Producers: Ant Chapman, James Ford, Erol Alkan

Klaxons singles chronology
"Gravity's Rainbow" (2006)	"Atlantis to Interzone" (2006)

Klaxons singles chronology
"Golden Skans" (2007)	"Gravity's Rainbow" (2007)	"It's Not Over Yet" (2007)

"Gravity's Rainbow" is a song by British band Klaxons, from their debut album Myths of the Near Future. It is loosely named after Thomas Pynchon's novel. The song was first released on Angular Records as a double A-side with "The Bouncer" in March 2006 and was limited to 500 copies on 7" vinyl only. In September 2006, it was released on 12" vinyl with three remixes of the track. It reached a peak position of number 35 on the UK Singles Chart. A re-recorded version of the track was re-released in 2007, with a remix from Soulwax, a new Erol Alkan-produced track "Electrickery" and a live version of the track. For the re-release of "Gravity's Rainbow", the band reshot the music video.

There are two videos for this track, the original was shot in a basement using props belonging to the band members and took in total 72 hours to complete. During the babies scene in the original video, an album cover from Frankie Valli and his band the Four Seasons is shown; Klaxons later covered their track "The Night" as a B-side of their single "It's Not Over Yet". The new version of "Gravity's Rainbow" was made to accompany the release of the new recording of the single and includes scenes reminiscent of those in the original. This version is also one of only two Klaxons videos that feature their drummer Steffan Halperin.

== Track listings ==
=== Original release ===
7"

1. "Gravity's Rainbow" – 2:37
2. "The Bouncer" - 2:15

12"

1. "Gravity's Rainbow" – 2:37
2. "Gravity's Rainbow" (Van She remix)
3. "Gravity's Rainbow" (Nightmoves remix)
4. "Gravity's Rainbow" (To My Boy remix)

=== Re-release ===
CD

1. "Gravity's Rainbow" – 2:36
2. "Gravity's Rainbow" (Soulwax remix)

7"

1. "Gravity's Rainbow" – 2:36
2. "Electrickery" (produced by Erol Alkan)

Etched 7"

1. "Gravity's Rainbow" (Live in Glasgow)

== In popular culture ==
The song was featured in the 2006 video game Tony Hawk's Project 8. The song also featured in Pro Evolution Soccer 2010 and the start of the Premier League years 2006/07.
