= Myths of the Near Future (album) =

Studio album by Klaxons
- Released: 29 January 2007
- Recorded: 2006
- Studios: The Premises; Parkgate
- Genres: Dance-punk; new rave; pop rock; post-punk revival
- Length: 53:46
- Label: Polydor
- Producer: James Ford

Klaxons chronology
Xan Valleys (2006)	Myths of the Near Future (2007)	Surfing the Void (2010)

Singles from Myths of the Near Future
- 1. "Magick" Released: 30 October 2006; 2. "Golden Skans" Released: 22 January 2007; 3. "Gravity's Rainbow" Released: 9 April 2007; 4. "It's Not Over Yet" Released: 25 June 2007; 5. "As Above, So Below" Released: 12 November 2007

Myths of the Near Future is the debut album by English rock band Klaxons. It was released on 29 January 2007 through Polydor Records. Following their debut single, the band coined the term "new rave" to refer to their sound; not long after their second single, they signed to Polydor Records. They recorded their debut album with James Ford of Simian Mobile Disco at The Premises and Parkgate Studios. Myths of the Near Future, which takes its title from a poem, is a science-fiction concept album about the future; some of the song's titles and lyrics are literary references to the works of J. G. Ballard, William S. Burroughs and Thomas Pynchon. To critics, its sound recalled the indie dance-punk revival led by bands such as Bloc Party and Franz Ferdinand.

"Magick" was released as the lead single from Myths of the Near Future in October 2006, followed by "Golden Skans" in January 2007. The album's released was promoted with two headlining tours of the United Kingdom bookending a North American trek in April 2007. That same month, "Gravity's Rainbow" was released as the album's third single; "It's Not Over Yet" followed in June 2007. Various festival appearances were made, leading to a West Coast tour of the United States. Bassist Jamie Reynolds broke his ankle, which saw the cancellation of some shows, and Joe Daniel of the Violets covering for him while he sang from a wheelchair. "As Above, So Below" was released as the album's fifth and final single in November 2007.

Myths of the Near Future received generally favourable reviews from critics, some of whom praised the musicianship, though others were dismissive of the rave tag. The album reached number two in the UK Albums Chart; it also charted in France, Italy, Japan and the Netherlands. "Magick", "Golden Skans", "Gravity's Rainbow" and "It's Not Over" all charted on the UK Singles Chart, with "Golden Skans" peaking the highest at number seven. Myths of the Near Future was certified platinum in the UK and silver in Ireland, both in 2007, and won the Mercury Prize that same year. "Golden Skans" was certified platinum in the UK in 2021.

== Background and recording ==
Keyboardist and vocalist James Righton met guitarist Simon Taylor while attending school; the latter would meet bassist and vocalist Jamie Reynolds. The trio formed Klaxons, playing their first shows in November 2005 and soon landed a feature in the NME. In January 2006, the band gained a manager and was attracting interest by labels. They released their debut single "Gravity's Rainbow" in March 2006, while its follow-up "Atlantis to Interzone" appeared in June 2006, with its B-side "Four Horsemen of 2012". While in the planning stages for the first single, Reynolds and Big Joe, who released the song through his label, were discussing genres that had yet to be revived. The pair settled on the term "new rave" as a joke, though Righton felt it was not representative of their sound. The tag was slowly being applied to the band's contemporaries, such as CSS and New Young Pony Club.

Taylor said the term stuck with Klaxons after they did a photo shoot "once wearing some funny capes and then everyone said it was this 'new rave' thing". Though the band tried distancing themselves from the genre, their fans would appear at their live shows with glow sticks and wear bright colours in the manner of 1990s rave culture. In May 2006, the band went on a short UK tour. Following a bidding war between various major labels, one of which tempted the band with a trip to space, they signed with Polydor Records. Klaxons appeared at Reading and Leeds Festivals and Bestival, before playing two shows in New York City. The bulk of their debut was recorded following Reading and Leeds.

Sessions were held at The Premises and Parkgate Studios, with James Ford of Simian Mobile Disco acting as producer and Jimmy Robertson as engineer. The band avoided electronic music, attempting to convey a similar sound with a guitar-bass-keyboard set up. "Gravity's Rainbow", "Atlantis to Interzone" and "Four Horsemen of 2012" were re-recorded for inclusion on the album. Ford played the drums on every track bar "Atlantis to Interzone", which were done by Steffan Halperin, who the band met through mutual friends of Twisted Charm. Nick Terry and Ford then mixed the recordings at The Strongrooms. In September and October 2006, they headlined the ShockWaves Presents Club NME on Tour, with support from Shitdisco, Datarock and Simian Mobile Disco. Klaxons were due to play a short, five-date US tour in November 2006; however, it was postponed in order for them finish working on their album.

== Composition and lyrics ==
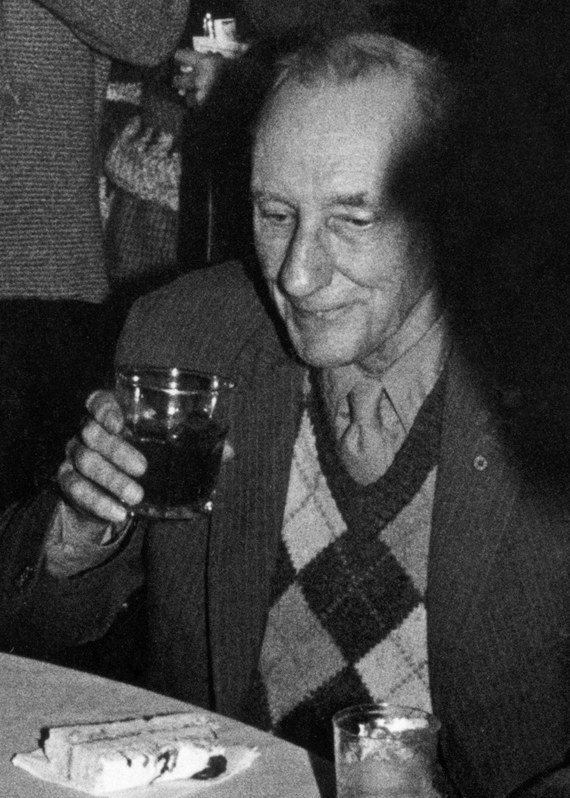
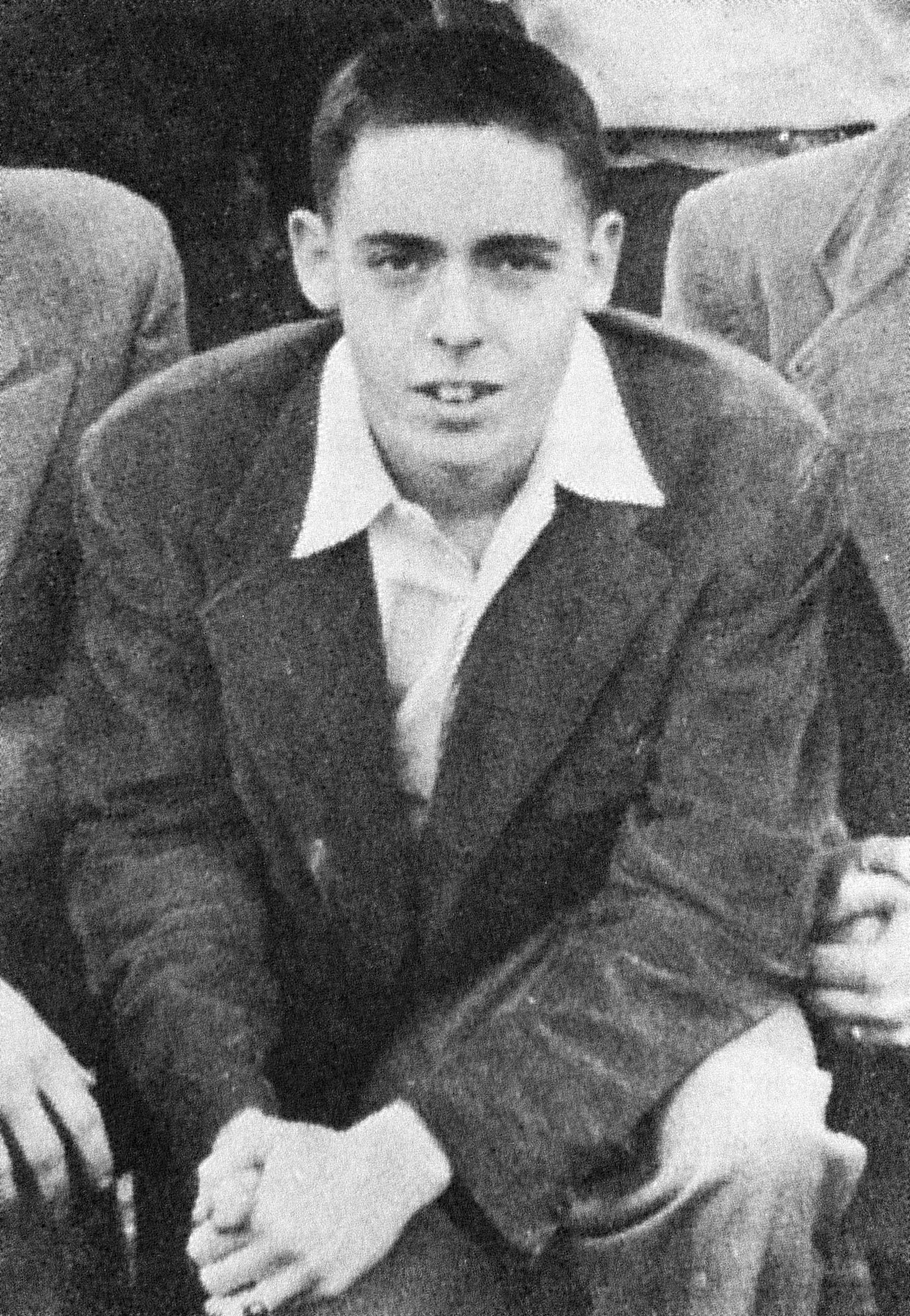
Postmodernist authors, such as William S. Burroughs (left) and Thomas Pynchon (right), are referenced in the songs on Myths of the Near Future.

=== Overview ===
Discussing the album's title, Taylor said "that's what all the songs are about. It came before the album", which is named after the anthology of short stories of the same name by British writer J. G. Ballard. Reynolds explained that it describes creating "something that doesn't exist yet. It was our challenge to make a debut album". The band described it as "a concept album about their fantasy vision of the future" and the first in a trilogy of albums, with subsequent releases intending to deal with the present and the past. Various postmodernism literary references can be heard throughout the album to the works of Ballard, William S. Burroughs and Thomas Pynchon, as well as commentary on Mayan prophecies, totemic ideology and futurism of science fiction. The band wrote the material in a small rehearsal room in the span of two weeks as to avoid over thinking.

Dave de Sylvia for Sputnikmusic broke the album into two portions: the rock half that is "dominated by the infectious and enviously-simple basslines" from Reynolds, while the second is focused on "slowly unfolding pop soundscapes" from Righton. AllMusic reviewer Heather Phares said the band's "sound is closer to dance-punk than revamped Madchester giddiness," akin to the work of Bloc Party instead of Happy Mondays, highlighted by their "most overtly dancey song" in the form of "Atlantis to Interzone". Uncut writer Piers Martin called it a "marvellous gonzo pop record in the vein of Super Furry Animals’ Fuzzy Logic, a syrupy blitz of [David] Bowie, Blur and Ballard". In a review for The Observer, journalist Simon Reynolds wrote that the band "draw so little on technorave's sonic principles", opting to employ "indie-rock's guitar/bass/drums", coming across as a "rowdier, more rough-hewn take on Franz Ferdinand's dance-punk".

=== Songs ===
The opening track of Myths of the Near Future, "Two Receivers", recalls "A View to a Kill" (1985) by Duran Duran and "Phat Planet" (1999) by Leftfield, setting the tone for the remainder of the album. "Atlantis to Interzone" starts with the sound of woman vocalizing over sirens, and features monk chanting during its chorus sections. The song's title references the Interzone (1989) by Burroughs, and is akin to a full band iteration of the Chemical Brothers. "Golden Skans" is an indie-funk song, which includes house-esque piano, that comes across as a mix of "Can You Feel It" (1981) by the Jacksons and "Good Dancers" (2003) by the Sleepy Jackson. "Golden Skans" is named after a light machine that appeared at various raves in the 1990s. The electropunk of "Totem on the Timeline" is reminiscent of the work of Franz Ferdinand, and namechecks Mother Teresa and Julius Caesar. "As Above, So Below" recalls Think Tank (2003)-era Blur, only to be interrupt by death metal guitar work in the style of Muse partway through. "Isle of Her" is tribute to Trojan mythology, where people rowed across the Mediterranean trying to find paradise; it evokes the work of the Smiths. Its title is a play on the phrase "I love her".

The staff at NME said "Gravity's Rainbow" is a disco-punk track that "captur[es] The Rapture's oozing vocals, !!!’s grooviness, DFA 1979's dirty basslines and a tune begging to be disassembled by Paul Epworth". The song's title refers to the Pynchon 1973 novel of the same name. "Forgotten Works" apes 13 (1999)-era Blur and "Everybody Wants to Rule the World" (1985) by Tears for Fears. "Magick" is a psychedelic, dance-punk track, with a title that borrows from the work of Aleister Crowley. When asked about referencing Crowley, Reynolds said it was "amusing to make a song about something that has caused a lot of trouble for other bands before". "It's Not Over Yet" is a cover of the Grace song "Not Over Yet" (1993), which shifts the band's new rave sound for dance-rock, backed by almost-industrial drums. It swaps the original's synthesizer riff for a guitar part, and places more of an emphasis on the vocal melody. Taylor referred to it as a "massive, heart-breaking pop song". The album concludes with "Four Horsemen of 2012", which is a homage mythological poetry, talks about centaurs riding flames across the skyline. Its title is a reference to 2012: The Return of Quetzalcoatl (2006) by Daniel Pinchbeck.

== Release ==
The Xan Valleys EP was released in Australia by Modular Recordings, consisting of Klaxons' first two singles, remixes and a music video. On 27 October 2006, Myths of the Near Future was announced for release in three months' time. "Magick" was released as the lead single from the album on three days later; the CD edition featured "Hall of Records" and a remix of "Magick". "Golden Skans" was released as the album's second single on 22 January 2007; the CD version included a remix of "Golden Skans" by Erol Alkan. Two versions were released on seven-inch vinyl: the first with live versions of "Golden Skans" and "The Bouncer", while the other featured a live version of "Atlantis to Interzone". Myths of the Near Future was released on 29 January 2007. Four days later, Halperin formally joined the band, who he had been playing live with for sometime.

Myths of the Near Future saw release in the US through Rinse Records on 27 March 2007. "Gravity's Rainbow" was released as the album's third single on 9 April 2007. The seven-inch vinyl version included "Electrickery" as its B-side, while the CD edition featured a remix of "Gravity's Rainbow" by Soulwax. Four days later, the band performed the song on Transmission. "It's Not Over Yet" was released as the album's fourth single on 25 June 2007. The seven-inch vinyl version included a cover of "The Night" (1972) by the Four Seasons as its B-side, while the CD edition featured a cover of "My Love" (2006) by Justin Timberlake, recorded for a BBC radio session. A French language version of "As Above, So Below", accompanied by a remix from Justice, was released as the album's fifth single on 12 November 2007 through Because Music.

== Touring ==
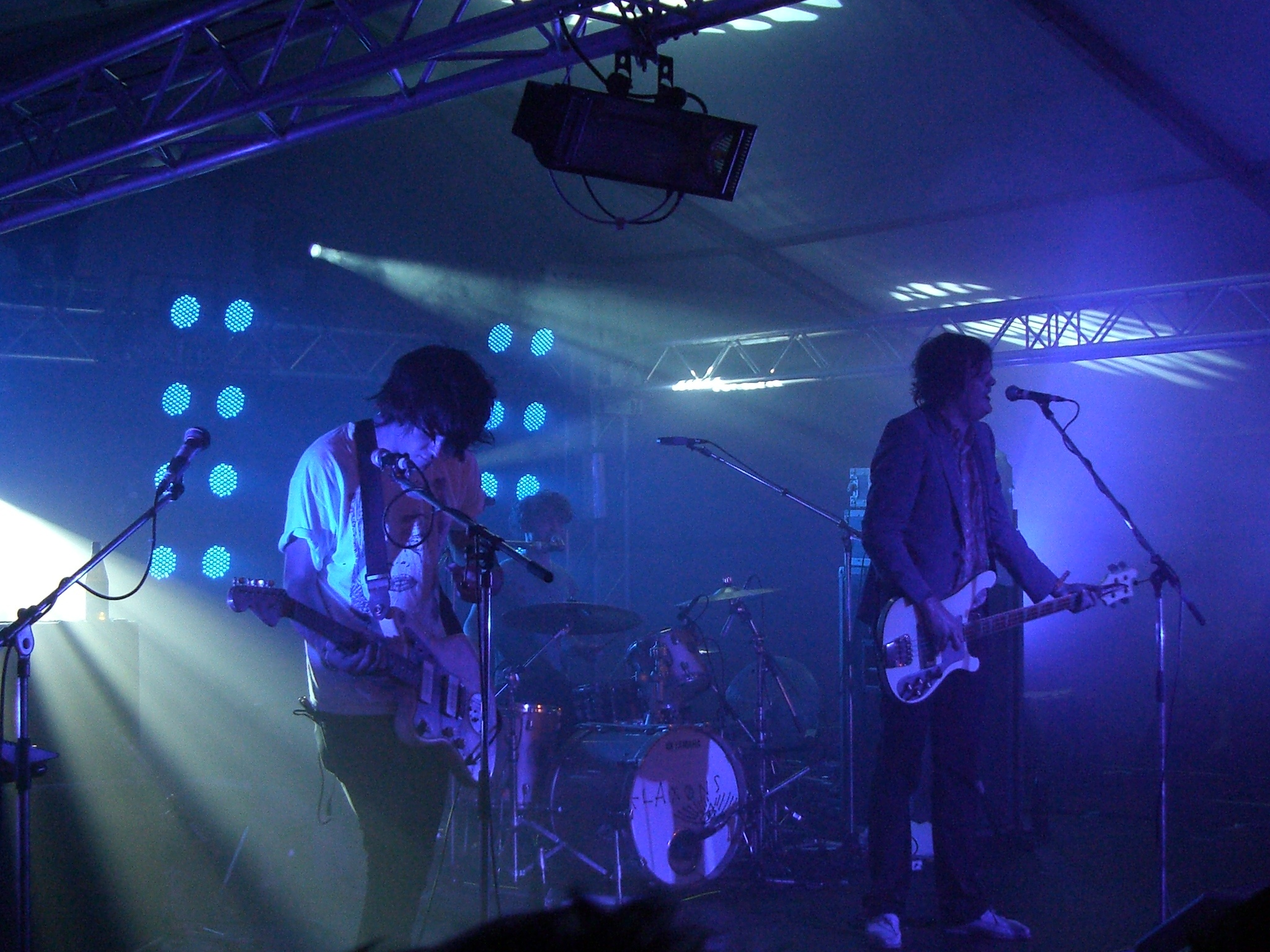
Klaxons toured throughout 2006 and 2007 for Myths of the Near Future.

Klaxons ended 2006 with three UK holiday shows, and a one-off Australian show for Modular Recordings, in December 2006. To promote the release of Myths of the Near Future, the band headlined the ShockWaves NME Awards Tour, which saw support from CSS, the Sunshine Underground and New Young Pony Club. Coinciding with the US edition of the album, they toured North America in April 2007. Klaxons went on another headlining UK tour in May 2007, three dates of which featured matinee shows. Following this, they performed at BBC Radio 1's Big Weekend, Glastonbury and Wireless Festivals. In July 2007, the band performed at T in the Park; surrounding their appearance at the Pitchfork Music Festival, the band played a handful of West Coast US shows. At the end of the month, the band played a delayed slot at Festival Internacional de Benicàssim as their flight was affected by poor weather conditions.

A French festival performance and a tour of Australia were cancelled when Reynolds broke his leg, prompting him to require surgery. As he was recovering, the Violets bassist Joe Daniel temporarily filled in while Reynolds sung from a wheelchair for a London show and a stint in Japan in August 2007, leading to an appearance at the Reading and Leeds Festivals. They supported Björk on her North American tour, before embarking on their own; the Los Angeles, California date marked Reynolds' first gig without his cast. The trek also included an appearance on Late Night with Conan O'Brien, where they played "Gravity's Rainbow". Following this, they toured across Australia and then mainland Europe. The band participated in the Oxjam festival; they closed out the year with a UK tour ad some shows in Japan in December 2007.

== Critical reception ==
Professional ratings
Aggregate scores
Source	Rating
Metacritic	71/100
Review scores
Source	Rating
AllMusic	3.5/5 stars
Blender	3.5/5 stars
Entertainment Weekly	B
Mojo	4/5 stars
NME	9/10
The Observer	4/5 stars
Pitchfork	7.5/10
Q	3/5 stars
Rolling Stone	2/5 stars
Uncut	4/5 stars

Myths of the Near Future was met with generally favourable reviews from music critics. At Metacritic, the album received an average score of 71, based on 28 reviews.

Phares said the band "don't limit themselves" as the album's "layered, deep-focus production prevents" them from "getting too boxed-in". Entertainment Weekly's Clark Collis said despite the various references, "you don't need a literature degree to appreciate the hooks and glorious, frenetic rhythms". Alex Miller of NME said that when the hype of new rave rescinds, the album would stand as "one of the most dynamic, intense and totally lunatic pop records of the early 21st century". Pitchfork contributor Marc Hogan said it served as a "reminder that, though the UK rock press's relationship with dance music can be Byzantine, hyberbolic, and endlessly offputting, plenty of young UK bands continue to record fine pop songs". Martin noted that the band were "hellbent on pushing things forward, regardless of where they end up. With this enjoyably frantic debut, they're off to a fine start".

Several reviewers were dismissive of the rave tag, while some said it only applied to "Atlantis to Interzone". Blender writer Jonah Weiner thought that the band's aesthetic "makes for some very good music", though said the majority of it was "unmemorable scenery—sustaining the weirdo mood without adding to it". Alex Macpherson of The Guardian considered it a "mess of clumsy beats that never settle into a groove, [...] and unpleasant-sounding, overdriven bass". Reynolds thought the listener "get the sense they don't know exactly what they're aiming for, and the resulting mish-mash of crude energy and unfocused ambition leaves the listener gloriously befuddled". Paul Cook of God Is in the TV shared a similar sentiment, stating that it was "somewhat of a hit or miss album that occasionally flickers with some stunning tracks".

== Commercial performance and accolades ==
The album charted at number two in the UK Album Chart, behind Norah Jones' album Not Too Late (2007). The album ended the year with sales of 274,000 in the UK. As of September 2020, it has sold 351,000 copies in the UK. It was certified platinum in the UK by the British Phonographic Industry (BPI) and silver in Ireland by the Irish Recorded Music Association, both in 2007. The album also charted at number 24 in France, number 35 in Japan, number 62 in the Flanders region of Belgium, number 72 in Italy, number 73 in Australia, number 83 in the Netherlands, and number 87 in the Wallonia region of Belgium, "Magick" charted at number 29 in the UK. "Golden Skans" charted at number seven in the UK, where it was certified platinum in 2021. "Gravity's Rainbow" charted at number 35 in the UK. "It's Not Over" charted at number 13 in the UK, where it was certified silver in 2022.

Myths of the Near Future won the Mercury Prize in 2007, which saw them earn £20,000, surpassing releases from Amy Winehouse and Bat for Lashes. The award saw album sales quintuple at the music retailer HMV. DIY, The Guardian and The Morning News all ranked the album at number five on their lists of the best releases of 2007, while Stereogum and Q ranked it at number 46 and 32 on their lists, respectively.

== Track listing ==
All lyrics by Jamie Reynolds and Simon Taylor, all music by Klaxons, except where noted.

No.	Title	Writer(s)	Length
1.	"Two Receivers"		4:18
2.	"Atlantis to Interzone"		3:18
3.	"Golden Skans"		2:45
4.	"Totem on the Timeline"		2:41
5.	"As Above, So Below"		3:58
6.	"Isle of Her"		3:54
7.	"Gravity's Rainbow"		2:37
8.	"Forgotten Works"		3:26
9.	"Magick"		3:30
10.	"It's Not Over Yet" (Grace cover)	Rob Davies; Paul Oakenfold; Michael Wyzgowski	3:35
11.	"Four Horsemen of 2012"		2:18
Total length:			36:31

Hidden tracks on UK edition
No.	Title	Length
12.	Untitled (silence; no audio)	15:00
13.	"Untitled"	2:26
Total length:		53:46

== Personnel ==
Personnel per sleeve.

Klaxons

- Jamie Reynolds – bass, vocals
- James Righton – keyboards, vocals
- Simon Taylor – guitar, vocals

Additional musicians

- James Ford – drums (all except track 2)
- Steffan Halperin – drums (track 2)

Production and design

- James Ford – producer, mixing
- Jimmy Robertson – engineer
- Nick Terry – mixing
- Simon Taylor – artwork
- Jamie Reynolds – artwork

== Charts and certifications ==
=== Weekly charts ===
Weekly chart performance for Myths of the Near Future
Chart (2007)	Peak position
Australian Albums (ARIA)	73
Belgian Albums (Ultratop Flanders)	62
Belgian Albums (Ultratop Wallonia)	87
Dutch Albums (Album Top 100)	83
French Albums (SNEP)	24
Italian Albums (FIMI)	72
Japanese Albums (Oricon)	35
UK Albums (Official Charts)	2

=== Certifications ===
Certifications for Myths of the Near Future
Region	Certification	Certified units/sales
Ireland (IRMA)	Gold	7,500^{^}
United Kingdom (BPI)	Platinum	300,000^{^}
^{^} Shipments figures based on certification alone.
