= Klaxons =

English band (2005–2015)

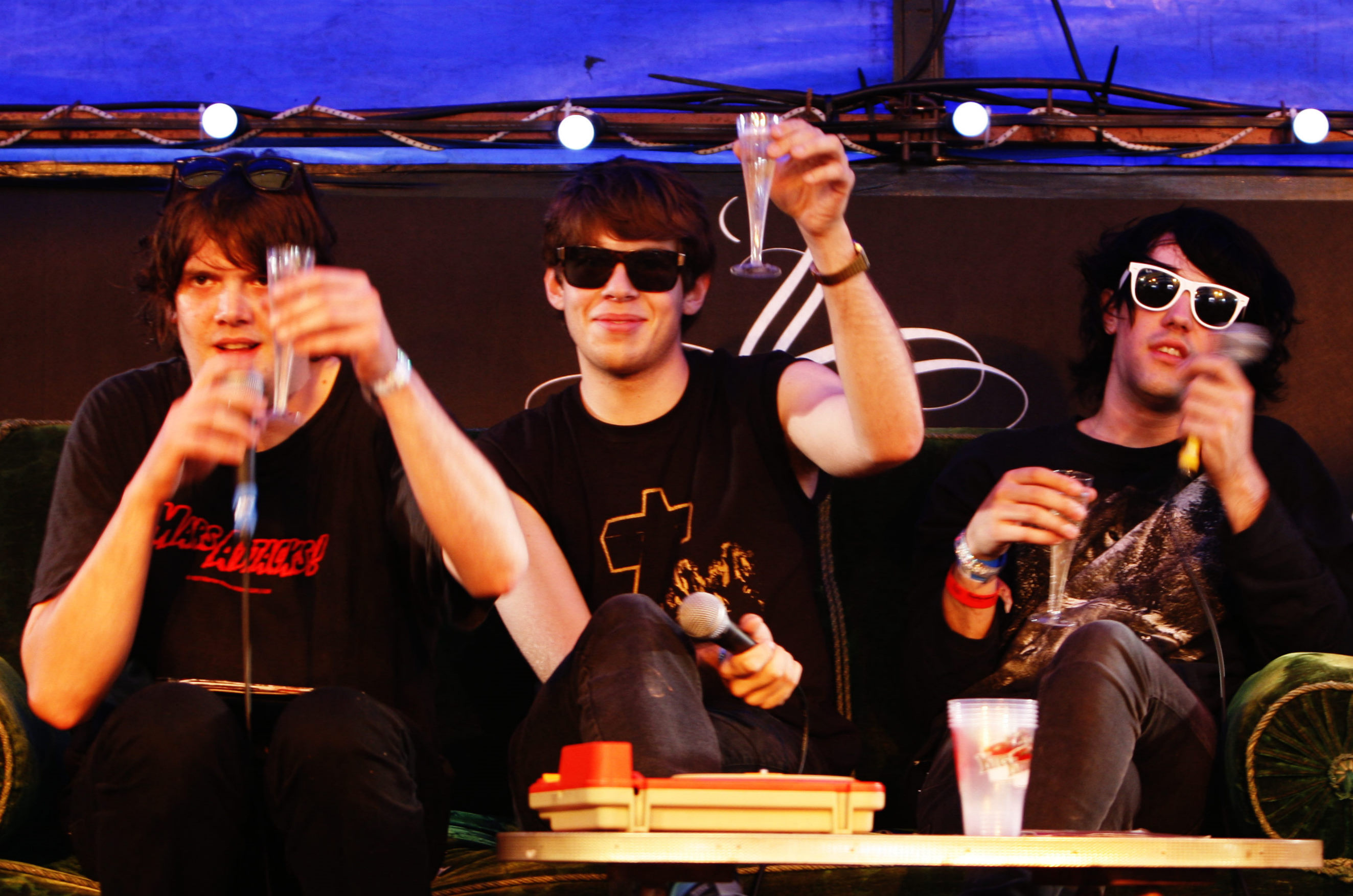
- Jamie Reynolds, James Righton and Simon Taylor-Davis of Klaxons at the Eurockéennes 2007

Background information
- Origin: London, England
- Genres: Indie rock; new rave; post-punk revival; electronic rock; dance-punk
- Years active: 2005–2015
- Labels: Akashic; Polydor; tinyOGRE; Geffen; Ed Banger; Modular; Angular; Merok; Because Music
- Past members: Jamie Reynolds; James Righton; Simon Taylor-Davis; Finnigan Kidd; Steffan Halperin; George Latham
- Website: klaxons.net

Klaxons were an English rock band based in London. Following the release of several 7-inch singles on different independent record labels, as well as the success of previous singles "Magick" and "Golden Skans", the band released their debut album, Myths of the Near Future on 29 January 2007. The album won the 2007 Nationwide Mercury Prize. After playing festivals and headlining tours worldwide (including the NME Indie Rave Tour) during late 2006–07, the band started working on their follow-up album in July 2007. Klaxons' second album, Surfing the Void, was released on 23 August 2010. Their third album, Love Frequency, was released on 16 June 2014. The band has been on indefinite hiatus since 2015.

== History ==
=== Formation (2005–2006) ===
Jamie Reynolds grew up in Bournemouth and Southampton. He dropped out of studying philosophy at Greenwich University to work in a record shop, Essential Records in Southampton, before moving to London and being made redundant. Simon Taylor-Davis and James Righton grew up in Stratford-upon-Avon, meeting at Stratford-upon-Avon High School. The trio formed in New Cross, London, after meeting through Reynolds' girlfriend. Righton had been working as a teacher at the time.

James taught Simon how to play guitar, and with Reynolds' redundancy money they purchased a studio kit. They recorded and performed live under their early guise of "Klaxons (Not Centaurs)", name inspired by Filippo Tommaso Marinetti's futurism text The Futurist Manifesto and the futurist literature. Initially the band played with drummer Finnigan Kidd in 2005, until Kidd left to play with fellow New Cross band, Hatcham Social. Replacement live drummer Steffan Halperin joined in February 2006, with the band announcing him as an official member in an interview in Prefix Magazine in early 2007. He remains mostly absent from the band's music videos, appearing only in the early video "Atlantis to Interzone" and briefly in the 2007 re-release of "Gravity's Rainbow".

=== Myths of the Near Future (2006–2008) ===
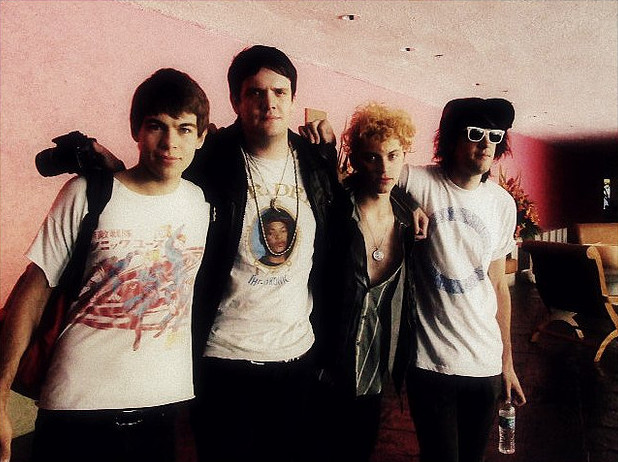
Klaxons in 2007

Klaxons' debut single, "Gravity's Rainbow" was released in March 2006 on Angular Records. Only 500 copies were released; all were printed on a 7-inch vinyl decorated by the band themselves. Radio 1's Steve Lamacq was the first DJ to play the band, and invited them to play a Maida Vale Studios live session on the strength of the single. The band's second single, "Atlantis to Interzone", was released on 12 June of the same year. It was their first release for independent record label Merok Records, and led to further coverage in NME magazine. The song enjoyed radio coverage from Zane Lowe and daytime airings from Jo Whiley, who repeatedly, and mistakenly, called the song "Atlantic To Interscope". Zane Lowe also wrongly credited the song as "Atlantis To Interscope". They released their first EP, Xan Valleys, on 17 October 2006. It was released on Australian record label Modular Recordings, and contained their first two singles alongside various remixes. The band played their first North American dates in New York's East Village in October 2006.

The band signed to Polydor Records in August 2006, following offers from numerous different record labels. Regarding the fee amount, James Righton said that it was "absurdly off the mark", and that the band signed for considerably less on the condition they would be given their own label imprint, Rinse Records. Their first single for the label, "Magick", was released on 30 October 2006 and reached #29 in the UK Top 40 the following week.

In August 2006, Klaxons played at the Reading and Leeds festivals. Fans sounded "Klaxons!" and cheered loudly between songs while brandishing glowsticks. This gave credit to the "New Rave" label, coined by band member Jamie Reynolds and later used by NME magazine to describe the scene. Also in August, the Klaxons performed an acoustic set in Ibiza Weekend for the UK's BBC Radio 1 at Ibiza Rocks festival with Zane Lowe.

The first single from their debut album, "Golden Skans", was released on 22 January 2007. It reached #16 in the UK Singles Chart on download sales alone, two weeks before the official release of the CD. It climbed to #14 the next week, eventually peaking at #7 after the CD release. On 24 January Klaxons performed on the BBC Radio 1 Live Lounge, performing "Golden Skans" and a cover version of Justin Timberlake's "My Love". The band then released "It's Not Over Yet", a cover of a song originally by Grace. The track included the "My Love" cover as a B-side, and peaked at #13 in the UK Singles Chart.

Their debut album, titled Myths of the Near Future, was released on 29 January 2007. It entered the UK Album Charts at #2, behind Norah Jones's album Not Too Late. Percussion and drumming on the album was provided by the album's producer James Ford, with live drummer Halperin recording on "Atlantis to Interzone".

On 1 October 2007, the band released A Bugged Out Mix, a double album featuring 27 tracks mixed by Reynolds. Klaxons singled out a new song that has strong progressive rock influences as a guide to one possible direction the album may go in, revealed recently NME magazine. Guitarist Simon Taylor said, "We wanna make something that's bigger and softer and louder and lo-fi and heavier produced - just lots of contradictions. I think it's gonna be like the last record but swollen. We've been listening to a lot of European prog music, and dubstep, and dance and folk. A huge broad variety of things really. There's one track we've been playing in soundcheck, it's this massive prog opus."

Klaxons performed with the singer Rihanna on her song "Umbrella" which had "Golden Skans" mixed into the background during the Brit Awards 2008 held in London on 20 February 2008. Klaxons won 'Best Album' at the 2008 NME Awards held at London's IndigO_{2} Arena on 28 February 2008. This followed having won 'Best New Band' the previous year. Klaxons also won 'Best International Album' and 'Best International Track' for "Golden Skans" at the first American NME awards, which were held in Los Angeles, California.

=== Surfing the Void (2008–2011) ===
Talk of a second album began in November 2007, during the band's UK winter tour. Influences include dubstep, dance and folk music. The band was featured on Steve Aoki's debut DJ mix album Pillowface and His Airplane Chronicles, contributing the Soulwax remix of "Gravity's Rainbow" for its release in January 2008. They made their live return with a series of gigs in Europe and South America during October 2008, debuting two new tracks, "Valley of the Calm Trees" and "Moonhead". In an interview with NME magazine in November, the band confirmed they were heading to France to record with James Ford, aiming to be completed by December for release in early 2009. The band made an appearance at Modular Records's NeverEverLand festival that toured around Australia in December 2008.

At the beginning of 2009, the band played a small club show at Madame Jojo's in London, their first in the capital since the NME Big Gig the previous year. During the set, the band featured new songs "Imaginary Pleasures" and "In Silver Forest", together with the previously aired "Moonhead" and "Valley of the Calm Trees". In March 2009, it was reported that the band had been told to re-record parts of their second album, after it was rejected by label Polydor. Reynolds said "we've made a really dense, psychedelic record" and that "it isn't the right thing for us [the band]". In an interview with BBC News, Reynolds revealed that "Moonhead" and new track "Marble Fields and the Hydrolight Head of Delusion" were "probably going to make it", and that they were working with "Simian Mobile Disco production" during April–May 2009. Reynolds added that "Valley of the Calm Trees" had been retitled "The Parhelion", to reflect its lyrical content. James Ford of Simian Mobile Disco confirmed working with the band later in the year, stating in an interview with Newsbeat that they were "...trying to keep it melodic and vocal because that's one of their great strong points".

On 22 May 2009, the band announced a show at Coventry's Kasbah nightclub, their only scheduled headline UK performance. The concert, to take place on 3 June, sparked rumours that the band may feature at the 2009 Glastonbury Festival. The band supported Blur at their comeback show at the Manchester Evening News Arena on 26 June, before playing a surprise set at Glastonbury the following day. The set included further new songs "Hoodoo Bora", "Future Memory" and "Echoes". In addition to Glastonbury, the band featured at numerous other festivals including Bestival, Ibiza Rocks, and headlined the Croatian Hartera festival.

It was announced during November 2009 that the band were now working with producer Ross Robinson, with Robinson confirming through his Twitter account. The band stated that work with Ford had gone astray, reaching difficulties with Ford acting as both producer and drummer. Klaxons broke from recording at the end of the year to perform at Get Loaded In the Dark at Brixton Academy on 31 December 2009, featuring alongside Chase & Status and Annie Mac. Recording was completed to the satisfaction of both band and label in February 2010. The following month, it was confirmed that the band would be playing Open'er Festival in Poland as well as the Reading and Leeds Festivals in the UK. They headlined the BBC Radio 1/NME Stage. Taylor-Davies suggested Reading and Leeds would be a UK-exclusive, saying, "I think in England it's just going to be Reading and Leeds, in terms of festivals, this summer".

On 25 May 2010, Zane Lowe premiered the track "Flashover" on his BBC Radio 1 show, the band's first new material in three years. Even though the track was not released as a single it was available on the band's new album, titled Surfing the Void. In support of the new album, the band announced an eight date tour of the UK and France, which took place during May–July 2010. For live performances, they were joined by Anthony Rossomando as a touring member.

Their second album Surfing the Void was released on 23 August 2010, and includes the single "Echoes", which was released one week prior. In contrast to the band's debut album which sold 350,000 in the UK, Surfing the Void sold 30,000 and was to be the last release with Universal/Polydor. On 25 December 2010, the band released on their website a free EP of material that was worked on for the album in 2007-2008, entitled Landmarks of Lunacy.

=== Love Frequency and hiatus (2012–2022) ===
In January 2012, Klaxons announced on their Twitter account that they were to begin recording their third album on 30 January. NME reported that the album was "expected to be released later" in the year and that the band were working with James Murphy and The Chemical Brothers. At Berlin Festival 2013 they played new songs "Children of the Sun", "Invisible Forces", "Love Frequency", "Rhythm of Life" and "New Reality" which were released on their 2014 album.

The album's lead single "There is No Other Time" is a collaboration with British production duo Gorgon City, and was premiered on Zane Lowe's BBC Radio 1 show on 3 February 2014, then becoming Radio 1's Track Of The Day the following day. Along with "Children Of The Sun", produced by Tom Rowlands of The Chemical Brothers, the AA-side single was released on 30 March 2014, followed by a four-date UK tour. On 10 February, "Children Of The Sun", was premiered on Steve Lamacq's BBC Radio 6 show. "There is No Other Time" entered the UK Singles Chart at number 42. Their third album, Love Frequency, was released on 16 June 2014. It entered the UK charts at number 38.

In October 2014 the band announced that their dates in the UK and Europe through October/November and Japan/South America in January 2015 would be their "last headline tour". The band's publicist was unable to confirm whether this meant the band were splitting up or not.

In June 2022, Righton was asked by NME if there was any chance of a Klaxons reunion. "No, I think that was such a fun, amazing thing we did," he replied. "I've so much love and respect for the other guys and never say never, but I think we did all right. We've had big offers for reunions through for years now, but it's not as easy as that or something I'd go lightly into."

== Artistry ==
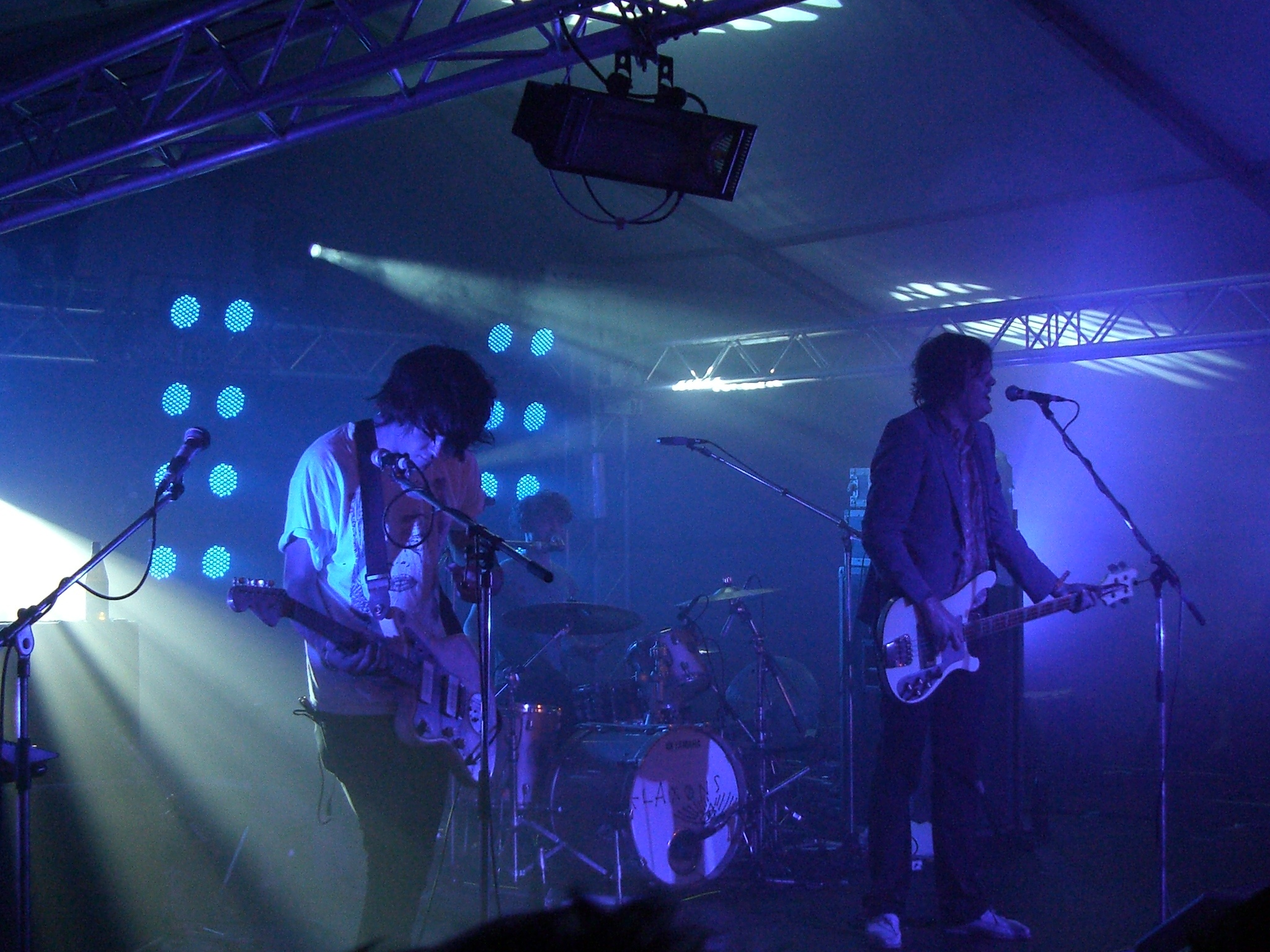
Klaxons at Queens' May Ball, 2007.

The band were described as "acid-rave sci-fi punk-funk" by the NME in Tim Chester's Radar feature and were at the forefront of the New Rave movement. Generally derided by critics, Jamie Reynolds explained New Rave as something that "started as an in-joke and became a minor youth subculture". The band's Facebook page lists the band's genre as "Psychedelic / Progressive / Pop".

== Band members ==
- Jamie Reynolds – bass, vocals (2005–2015)
- James Righton – keyboards, vocals (2005–2015)
- Simon Taylor-Davies – guitars (2005–2015)

Touring members

- George Latham – drums (2013–2015)

Past members

- Steffan Halperin – drums (2007–2013)

== Discography ==
- Myths of the Near Future (2007)
- Surfing the Void (2010)
- Love Frequency (2014)

== Awards and nominations ==
Award	Year	Category	Nominated work	Result	Ref,
BT Digital Music Awards	2007	Best Rock/Indie Artist		Nominated	
Q Awards	2007	Best New Act		Nominated	
Mercury Prize	2007	Best Album	Myths of the Near Future	Won	
MTV Europe Music Awards	2007	Best UK & Irish Act		Nominated	
NME Awards	2007	Best New Band		Won	
Vodafone Live Music Awards	2007	Live Breakthrough Act		Won	
Brit Awards	2008	Best Live Act		Nominated	
Brit Awards	2008	Breakthrough Act		Nominated	
Ivor Novello Awards	2008	Best Contemporary Song	"Golden Skans"	Won	
NME Awards	2008	Best Album	Myths of the Near Future	Won	
NME Awards	2008	Best British Band		Nominated	
NME Awards	2008	Best Video	"Golden Skans"	Nominated	
NME Awards	2008	Best Dancefloor Filler	"Atlantis to Interzone"	Nominated	
NME Awards USA	2008	Best International Track	"Golden Skans"	Won	
NME Awards USA	2008	Best New International Band		Won	
NME Awards USA	2008	Best New International Live Act		Won	
NME Awards USA	2008	Best International Album	Myths of the Near Future	Nominated	
Best Art Vinyl	2010	Best Artwork	Surfing the Void	Won	
NME Awards	2011	Best Album Artwork	Surfing the Void	Won	
