= 7llvsion =

Studio album by Boys Noize
- Released: 6 November 2026
- Genre: Electronic
- Length: 38:28
- Labels: Ones and Zeros
- Producers: Adame DJ; Boys Noize; Francis Novotny; Raiden; Locked Club; Safety Trance; Zep

Boys Noize chronology
| Nine Inch Noize (2026) | 7llvsion (2026) |

7llvsion (pronounced "illusion" and stylized in all caps) is the sixth studio album by the German electronic music artist Boys Noize, released on 6 November 2026 by Ones and Zeros. The album is his first album in five years, following 2021's +/- (Polarity).

== Critical reception ==
A.D. Amorosi of Flood Magazine says the album "beats to its own drummer", stating, "Boys Noize brings genuine heat to his once-chilly sound for the most maximal album of his career." Megan Venzin of DJ Mag says the LP "lands heavy, raw and unapologetically thick. Not quite a club album and too out there for popular airwaves, it’s an LP that commands respect, if not instant resonance." Zangba Thomson of Bong Mines Entertainment says, "The project treats the dance floor as a place where different scenes and rhythmic traditions can meet without settling into a single genre."

== Track listing ==
7llvsion track listing
| No. | Title | Lyrics | Music | Producer(s) | Length |
|---|---|---|---|---|---|
| 1. | "Illusion" | | Alexander Ridha | Boys Noize; James Cameron Ward^{[a]} | 3:03 |
| 2. | "1+1+1" (with Zep) | | Ridha; Christian Astrop; Zep Barnasconi; Nathaniel Long | Boys Noize; Zep | 2:57 |
| 3. | "Take Me Out" | | Ridha | Boys Noize | 3:05 |
| 4. | "Nächstenliebe" (with Brutalismus 3000) | Victoria Daldas | Ridha; Daldas; Theo Zeitner | Boys Noize | 2:50 |
| 5. | "HYYTUP" | Naeem | Ridha; Franz Novotny | Boys Noize; Francis Novotny; Raiden; Seok-hyun Han^{[c]} | 3:17 |
| 6. | "Baile DF" (with Adame DJ, Thalia Abdon, and MC Da França) | Thalia Abdon; Da França | Ridha; Pedro de Souza Adame | Boys Noize; Adame DJ | 3:05 |
| 7. | "Wake Me Up" (with Locked Club) | | Ridha; Ilya Gadaev | Boys Noize; Locked Club | 3:17 |
| 8. | "I Need Luv" (with Safety Trance and Abra) | Gabrielle Mirville | Ridha; Luis Garbàn; Mirville | Boys Noize; Safety Trance | 2:58 |
| 9. | "Sh5b0mbe" | | Ridha | Boys Noize | 3:06 |
| 10. | "Shut It Down" (with Taichu and Taube) | Tais López Miranda | Ridha; Tommy Schreiber | Boys Noize | 3:33 |
| 11. | "Ycore" (with Mayah Alkhateri) | Mayah Alkhateri | Ridha; Alkahateri | Boys Noize | 4:11 |
| 12. | "Sireneh" | Ridha | Ridha | Boys Noize | 3:06 |
| Total length: | | | | | 38:28 |

=== Note ===
- ^{^[c]} indicates a co-producer
- ^{^[a]} indicates an additional producer

== Personnel ==
These credits are adapted from Tidal.

- Boys Noize – programming, mixing
- Mike Marsh – mastering (tracks 1, 5, 6, 9, 10)
- Mike Hinton – mastering (2–4, 7)
- Zep – programming (2)
- Victoria Daldas – vocals (4)
- Pedro de Souza Adame – programming (6)
- Da França – vocals (6)
- Thalia Abdon – vocals (6)
- Halsey – vocals (7)
- Randy Merrill – mastering (8, 11)
- Safety Trance – programming (8)
- Abra – vocals (8)
- Tommy Schreiber – programming (10)
- Tais López Miranda – vocals (10)
- Mayah Alkhateri – vocals (11)
- Joël Krozer – mastering (12)
