= Boys Noize =

German music producer (born 1982)

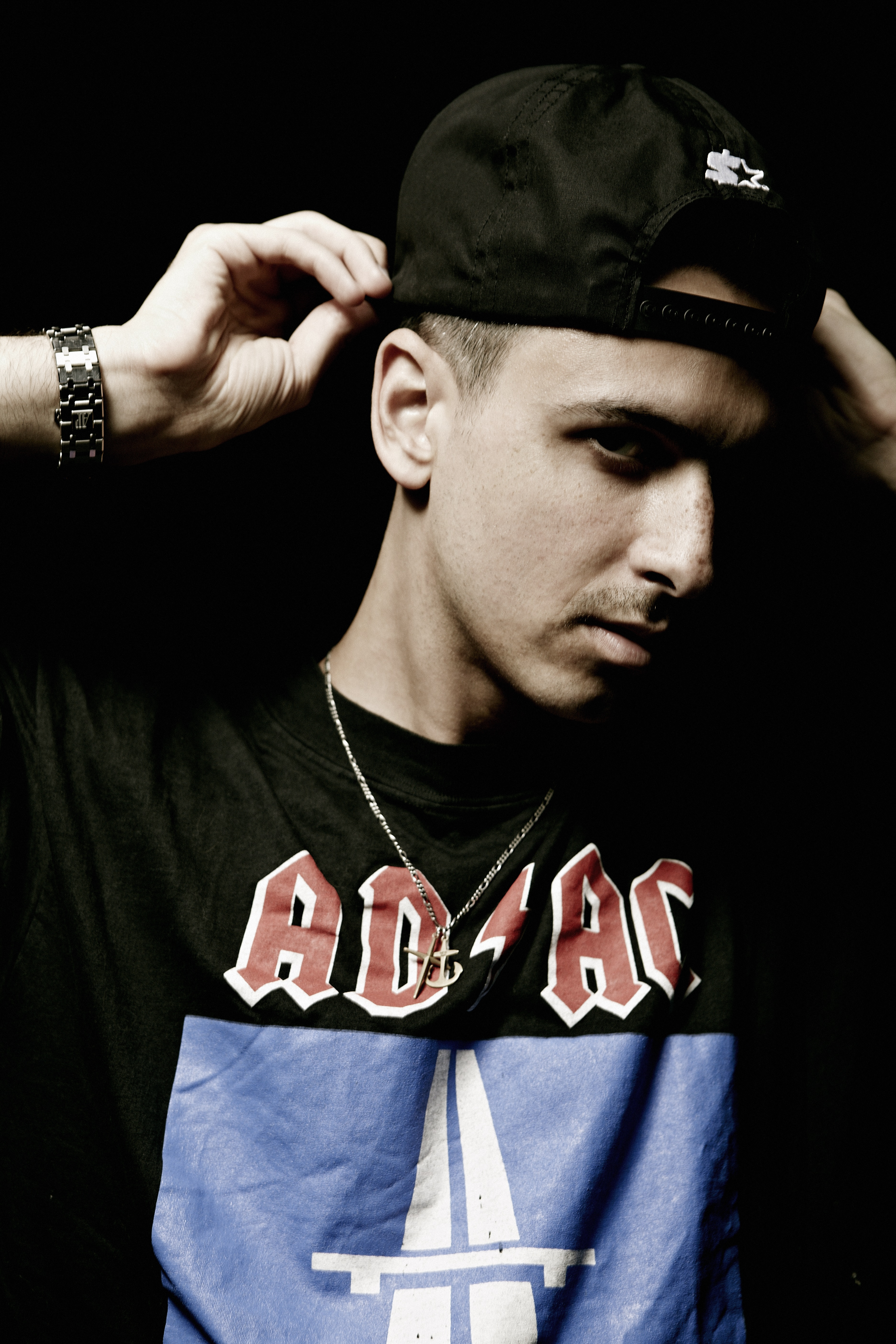
- Boys Noize in 2012

Background information
- Born: Alexander Ridha; 22 August 1982 (age 44); Hamburg, West Germany
- Genres: Electro house; techno; acid house
- Occupations: DJ; record producer; songwriter
- Years active: 2004–present
- Labels: Boysnoize Records; Ones and Zeros
- Member of: Dog Blood; Nine Inch Noize
- Website: boysnoize.com

Alexander "Alex" Ridha (born 22 August 1982), better known by his stage name Boys Noize, is a German-Iraqi electronic music record producer, songwriter and DJ known for collaborations with artists including A$AP Rocky, Tommy Cash, Frank Ocean, and Nine Inch Nails, and remixes of artists including Daft Punk, the Yeah Yeah Yeahs, Snoop Dogg and Depeche Mode. In 2005, Ridha established his label, Boysnoize Records, and, in 2025, launched a new concept label, Ones and Zeros.

Ridha formed the duo Dog Blood along with American electronic musician Skrillex. He is also half of the duo Octave Minds with Chilly Gonzales. In 2012, Rolling Stone named Boys Noize one of the Top 25 "DJs That Rule the Earth". He earned a Grammy nomination in 2019 for "Midnight Hour", his house collaboration with Skrillex featuring Ty Dolla Sign, and he co-wrote the Grammy-winning Lady Gaga hit "Rain on Me".

== Biography ==
Ridha started producing and DJing from an early age, including a period in which he supported Felix Da Housecat and DJ Hell under the alias of Kid Alex. He has been named one of the "Top 25 DJs That Rule the Earth" by Rolling Stone, elected "Best Electronic Act" by Beatport three years in a row, and was awarded the Independent Music Award in 2010. His music is known to merge various styles, with influences of hip-hop and disco roots as well as heavy noise and electro house sounds.

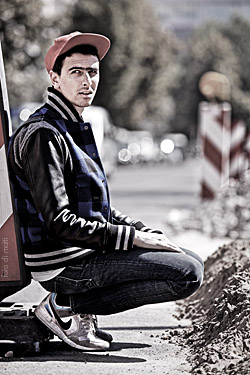
Boys Noize pictured in Berlin in 2009

Ridha released his early work on labels such as International DeeJay Gigolo Records, Kitsuné Musique and Turbo Recordings. He established Boysnoize Records in 2005.

He remixed David Lynch, N.E.R.D, Depeche Mode, Snoop Dogg, Daft Punk, Justice, and The Chemical Brothers amongst many other well-known artists and became a producer of note, having worked with Kelis, UK rapper Kano, The Black Eyed Peas, and the South Korean band BigBang and has also collaborated with the New York band Scissor Sisters on their single "Only The Horses" from their fourth album, "Magic Hour".

Chilly Gonzales' Ivory Tower is Ridha's first fully produced and co-written album, released in August 2010.

He has further collaborated with Erol Alkan: the first record "Death Suite" / "Waves" was released on Ridha's imprint BNR, followed by "Lemonade" / "Avalanche", which came out on Erol's label Phantasy Sound.

In October 2010, the first release of the newly launched sublabel BNR Trax was presented.

In 2012, Boys Noize released his third studio album, Out of the Black.

In 2012, Boys Noize formed a side-project with Skrillex called Dog Blood which is in the electro genre. Dog Blood performed at the 2013 Miami Ultra Music Festival.

Boysnoize Records celebrated its 100th release in 2013, with electronic dance heavyweights The Chemical Brothers and Justice remixing Boys Noize's "XTC" and "Ich R U".

In 2014, Boys Noize did the theme music composition for a German movie named Who Am I – No System Is Safe. Ridha also collaborated with Chilly Gonzales to form Octave Minds. Their self-titled debut album was released on BNR with track premieres on Pitchfork, Dazed and Confused, and the Fader. Besides the album features a track called "Tap Dance", which features Chance the Rapper and the Social Experiment.

Boys Noize released his Go Hard EP in 2013 on Beatport. In August 2015 it was announced that Ridha had collaborated with Jean-Michel Jarre on the track "The Time Machine" from the album Electronica 1: The Time Machine.

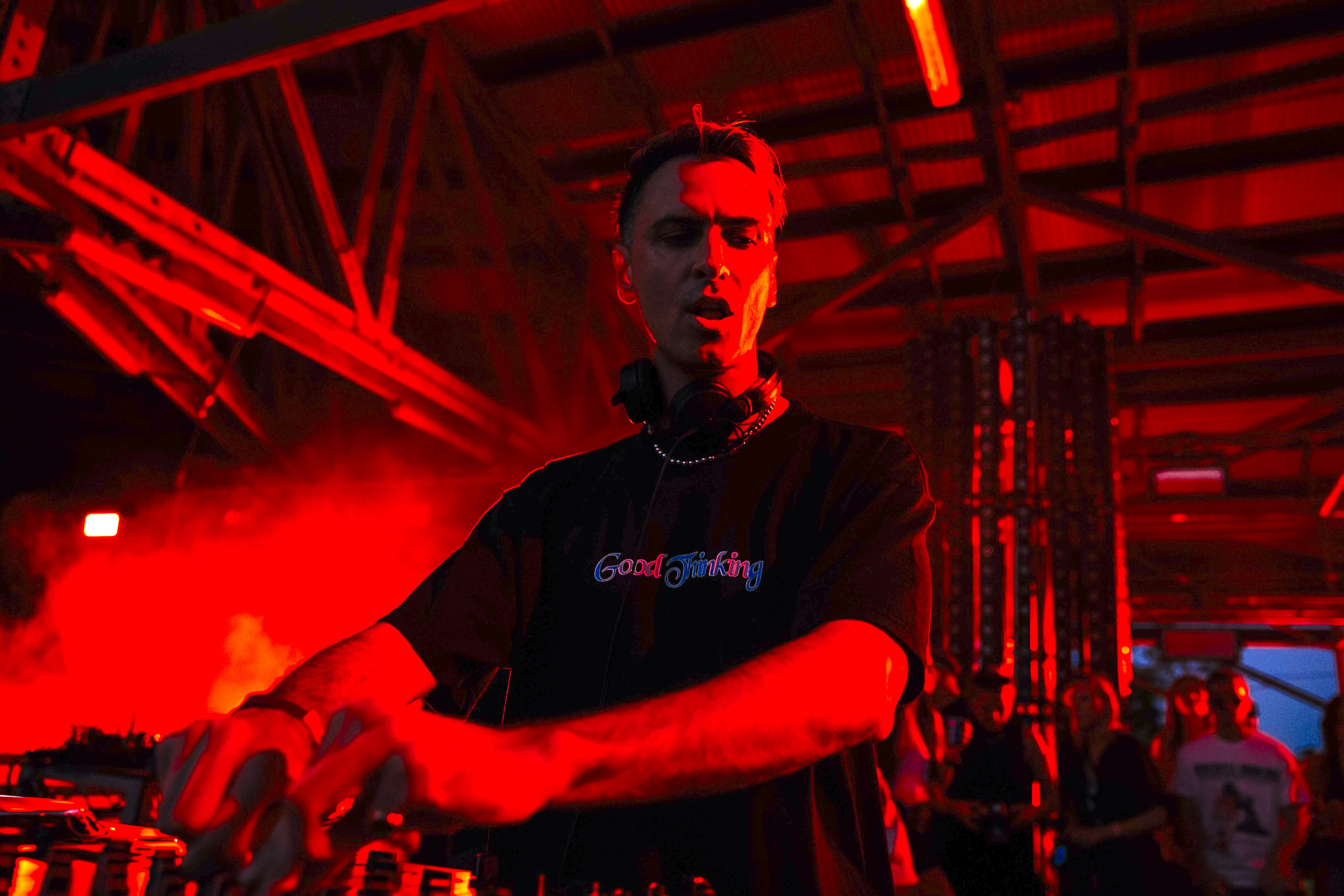
Boys Noize in 2022

In 2016, Boys Noize released his fourth studio album, Mayday, which included collaborations with Benga, Remy Banks, Poliça, Hudson Mohawke, and Spank Rock. He described it as "[his] signal against blind categorization and conformist synchronization", "a call for individuality and diversity", and "a tribute to outsiders". It peaked at number 8 on Billboard's Top Dance/Electronic Albums chart.

In 2025, he launched an "experimental concept label", Ones and Zeros, with a compilation that featured 22 artists. His sixth album, titled 7llvsion (pronounced "illusion"), was announced for release on 6 November 2026 under Ones and Zeros.

=== Nine Inch Noize ===
In 2024, Ridha began collaborating with Nine Inch Nails. First he remixed the Challengers soundtrack, titled Challengers (Mixed); he was subsequently asked to co-produce tracks for the Tron: Ares soundtrack, including the tracks "As Alive as You Need Me to Be" and "Shadow Over Me".

In 2025, he was booked as the opening act for Nine Inch Nails' Peel It Back Tour in 2025, joining the band on stage each night for an EDM-inspired section of their set. In September, it was announced that Nine Inch Nails and Boys Noize would perform at Coachella 2026 as a supergroup called Nine Inch Noize, with the performances acting as an extension of the Peel It Back Tour's third act.

On 17 April 2026, Nine Inch Noize released their self-titled album.

== Discography ==
=== Albums and EPs ===
==== Studio albums as lead artist ====
List of albums as lead artist, with selected chart positions
Title	Album details	Peak chart positions					
Title	Album details	BEL (FL)	BEL (WA)	FRA	SWI	US Dance	US Heat.
Oi Oi Oi	Released: 25 September 2007; Label: Boysnoize Records	65	—	95	—	—	—
Power	Released: 1 October 2009; Label: Boysnoize Records	24	62	144	—	23	—
Out of the Black	Released: 16 October 2012; Label: Boysnoize Records	49	49	123	90	23	42
Mayday	Released: 20 May 2016; Label: Boysnoize Records	87	128	—	—	—	—
+/-	Released: 24 September 2021; Label: Boysnoize Records	—	—	—	—	—	—
7llvsion	Released: 6 November 2026; Label: Ones and Zeros	—	—	—	—	—	—
"—" denotes a recording that did not chart or was not released in that territory.

==== Collaborative albums ====
List of collaboration albums & extended plays
Title	Artists	Release details
Octave Minds	Octave Minds (Boys Noize and Chilly Gonzales)	Released: 2014; Label: Boysnoize Records
Nine Inch Noize	Nine Inch Noize (Boys Noize and Nine Inch Nails)	Released: 2026; Label: The Null Corporation, Interscope

==== Remix albums ====
- Oi Oi Oi (Remixed), 2008
- Out of the Black – The Remixes, 2013
- Challengers (Mixed), 2024

==== Mix albums ====
- Bugged Out! Presents Suck My Deck (Mixed by Boys Noize) (2008)
- I Love Techno 2008 (Mixed by Boys Noize) (2008)
- Radio Soulwax Mix (2009)
- Mixmag Presents Electro Techno Thunder! (2009)
- South West Four Clapham Festival Preview (2010)
- Mixmag Presents Boys Noize And Friends (2013)
- Fabriclive 72: Boys Noize (2013)
- BNR10YR Bang Mix (Mixed by Boys Noize) (2013)
- 99% BNR All-Star Mix (2016)

==== Extended plays ====
List of EPs
Title	Album details
Are You In?	Released: 2005; Label: Datapunk
Erole Attack	Released: 2005; Label: Turbo Records
Kill the Kid	Released: 2006; Label: Boysnoize Records
Sessions, Vol. 1	Released: 2011; Label: Boysnoize Records
Go Hard	Released: 2013; Label: Boysnoize Records
Strictly Raw Vol. 1	Released: 2015; Label: Boysnoize Records
Strictly Raw Vol. 2	Released: 2018; Label: Boysnoize Records
Strictly Bvnker Vol. 1	Released: 2020; Label: Boysnoize Records
Hardc0re Dr3amz (with Rico Nasty)	Released: 2024; Label: Sugar Trap/Atlantic Records/Big Beat
LVLY	Released: 2024; Label: Raw

==== Collaborative EPs ====
List of collaboration albums & extended plays
Title	Artists	Release details
Thomas	Puzique (Boys Noize and D.I.M.)	Released: 2006; Label: Boysnoize Records
Don't Go	Puzique (Boys Noize and D.I.M.)	Released: 2007; Label: Boysnoize Records
#1	Handbraekes (Boys Noize and Mr. Oizo)	Released: 2012; Label: Boysnoize Records
Middle Finger	Dog Blood (Boys Noize and Skrillex)	Released: 2013; Label: Boysnoize Records, Owsla
Middle Finger Pt. 2	Dog Blood (Boys Noize and Skrillex)	Released: 2013; Label: Boysnoize Records, Owsla
#2	Handbraekes (Boys Noize and Mr. Oizo)	Released: 2014; Label: Boysnoize Records
#3	Handbraekes (Boys Noize and Mr. Oizo)	Released: 2018; Label: Ed Banger Records
Turn Off The Lights	Dog Blood (Boys Noize and Skrillex)	Released: 2019; Label: Atlantic

=== Singles ===
==== Singles as lead artist ====
List of singles
Year	Title	Album	Label
2004	"The Bomb / Boy Neu"	Non-album singles	International DeeJay Gigolo Records
2005	"Optic / He-man"	Non-album singles	Boysnoize Records
2005	"Volta 82"	Non-album singles	Boysnoize Records
2006	"Feel Good (TV=Off)"	Non-album singles	Kitsuné Musique
2007	"& Down"	Oi Oi Oi	Boysnoize Records
2007	"Don't Believe the Hype"	Oi Oi Oi	Boysnoize Records
2007	"Lava Lava"	Oi Oi Oi	Boysnoize Records
2008	"My Head"	Non-album single	Boysnoize Records
2009	"Starter"	Power	Boysnoize Records
2010	"Transmission (Pt. 1 and Pt. 2)"	Power	Boysnoize Records
2010	"Nott / Trooper"	Power	Boysnoize Records
2010	"1010 / Yeah"	Non-album singles	Boysnoize Records
2011	"Adonis"	Non-album singles	Cocoon Recordings
2012	"XTC"	Out of the Black	Boysnoize Records
2012	"What You Want"	Out of the Black	Boysnoize Records
2012	"Ich R U"	Out of the Black	Boysnoize Records
2014	"Alarm"	Non-album single	Boysnoize Records
2015	"Cerebral"	Strictly Raw, Vol. 1	Boysnoize Records
2015	"Overstayer"	Strictly Raw, Vol. 1	Boysnoize Records
2016	"Overthrow"	Mayday	Boysnoize Records
2016	"Euphoria" (featuring Remy Banks)	Mayday	Boysnoize Records
2016	"Starchild" (featuring Polica)	Mayday	Boysnoize Records
2016	"Birthday" (featuring Hudson Mohawke, Spank Rock, Danny Brown, and Pell)	Mayday	Boysnoize Records
2016	"Midnight"	Mayday	Boysnoize Records
2018	"Disco Inferno" (featuring Marteria and Haftbefehl)	Non-album singles	Boysnoize Records
2018	"Orange" (with Virgil Abloh)	Non-album singles	Boysnoize Records
2018	"Killer" (featuring Steven A. Clark)	Non-album singles	Boysnoize Records
2020	"Buchla 100"	Non-album singles	Boysnoize Records
2020	"Girl Crush" (featuring Rico Nasty)	+/-	Boysnoize Records
2020	"Mvinline"	Non-album single	Defected Records
2021	"All I Want" (featuring Jake Shears)	+/-	Defected Records
2021	"IU" (featuring Corbin)	+/-	Boysnoize Records
2021	"Nude / Xpress Yourself"	+/-	Boysnoize Records
2021	"Affection" (featuring Abra)	+/-	Boysnoize Records
2021	"Detune"	+/-	Boysnoize Records
2021	"Biate"	Non-album singles	Boysnoize Records
2022	"Trip" (with Skream)	Non-album singles	Boysnoize Records
2022	"Let Us Rave" (featuring Naeem and Velvet Negroni)	Non-album singles	Boysnoize Records
2023	"Pvssy" (featuring Pilo and Deevious)	Non-album singles	Boysnoize Records
2023	"Chastity" (featuring Pussy Riot and Alice Glass)	Non-album singles	Boysnoize Records
2024	"Fvkvrvnd"	Non-album singles	Hard Records
2025	"Cdxota" (featuring Locked Club and Me Jesmay)	Boys Noize presents ONES and ZEROS	Ones and Zeros
2025	"Sireneh"	7llusion	Ones and Zeros
2026	"Hyytup / Sh5b0mbe"	7llusion	Ones and Zeros
2026	"Shut It Down" (featuring Taichu and Taube)	7llusion	Ones and Zeros
2026	"Itvlo" / "Lovded"	Non-album single	Running Back
2026	"Baile DF" (with Adame DJ, Thalia Abdon and MC Da França)	7llusion	Ones and Zeros
2026	"1+1+1" (featuring Zep)	7llusion	Ones and Zeros
2026	"Nächstenliebe" (featuring Brutalismus 3000)	7llusion	Ones and Zeros
2026	"Ycore" (featuring Mayah Alkhateri)	7llusion	Ones and Zeros

==== Collaborative tracks ====
List of collaboration singles
Year	Title	Artists	Album	Label
2009	"Waves / Death Suite"	Erol Alkan & Boys Noize		Boysnoize Records
2010	"Avalanche / Lemonade"	Erol Alkan & Boys Noize		Boysnoize Records
2010	"The Ultimate"	Feadz featuring Boys Noize	The T.U.F.F. EP	Ed Banger Records
2011	"Shizzo"	Boys Noize and Housemeister		Boysnoize Records
2011	"Avalanche (Terminal Velocity)"	Erol Alkan & Boys Noize featuring Jarvis Cocker		Phantasy Sound
2012	"Roland Rat / Brain Storm"	Erol Alkan & Boys Noize		Boysnoize Records
2012	"Feeling"	Boys Noize and BigBang	Alive (Japanese Edition)	YGEX, Avex Trax
2013	"I Love It"	G-Dragon featuring Zion.T and Boys Noize	Coup d'Etat	YG Entertainment
2014	"Danger"	RL Grime featuring Boys Noize	Void	WeDidIt Records
2015	"100"	Tiga and Boys Noize		Turbo Recordings
2015	"#Capture the City"	Boys Noize and Yoon Mirae (윤미래)		Boysnoize Records
2015	"The Time Machine"	Jean Michel Jarre and Boys Noize	Electronica 1: The Time Machine	Sony Music
2016	"Ruhe"	Mr. Oizo featuring Boys Noize	All Wet	Ed Banger Records
2018	"Orvnge"	Boys Noize & Virgil Abloh		Boysnoize Records
2018	"Spree"	Aaron Dessner, Bryce Dessner, Andi Toma, Jan St. Werner, Boys Noize & Thom Sonny Green	People Mixtape 1	37d03d
2019	"Midnight Hour"	Skrillex, Boys Noize, and Ty Dolla Sign		Atlantic / OWSLA
2019	"FMU"	Brooke Candy featuring Boys Noize and Rico Nasty	Sexorcism	
2019	"Why Not?"	Boys Noize & Francis and the Lights		Boysnoize Records
2021	"Ride or Die"	Boys Noize & Kelsey Lu featuring Chilly Gonzales	+/-	Boysnoize Records
2021	"Love & Validation"	Boys Noize & Kelsey Lu	+/-	Boysnoize Records
2021	"Unlock It"	Abra and Boys Noize featuring Playboi Carti		Polo Grounds Music / RCA Records
2022	"Fashion"	Kungs and Boys Noize	Club Azur	Val / Def Jam
2022	"Trip"	Boys Noize and Skream		Boysnoize Records
2023	"Steady Pace"	VTSS and Boys Noize		Big Beat Records
2023	"Fine Day Anthem"	Skrillex and Boys Noize		Boysnoize Records / Atlantic
2024	"Spa8cid"	Unklevon featuring Boys Noize	UN1C	Boysnoize Records
2024	"Tell Me"	Shygirl featuring Boys Noize	Club Shy	Because Music
2024	"Arintintin"	Rico Nasty and Boys Noize	Hardc0re Dr3amz	Sugar Trap / Atlantic Records / Big Beat
2025	"Zeet Noise"	Skrillex featuring Boys Noize and Dylan Brady	Fuck U Skrillex You Think Ur Andy Warhol but Ur Not!!	Atlantic / OWSLA
2025	"Dominator"	Boys Noize and Human Resource		Armada Music B.V.
2025	"Red"	Lsdxoxo featuring Boys Noize	Dgtl Anml	Fantasy Audio Group
2025	"True Religion"	Lsdxoxo featuring Boys Noize	Dgtl Anml	Fantasy Audio Group
2025	"Crazy For It"	Keinemusik and Boys Noize featuring Vinson		Keinemusik
2026	"Hot Wife"	Tiga and Boys Noize	Hotlife	Turbo Recordings
2026	"Get Away"	Kungs and Boys Noize	Out Loud	Val / Polydor France
2026	"I Bring My Gun To The Function"	Brutalismus 3000 with Boys Noize	Harmony	Live from Earth / Columbia
2026	"VcidFutur3"	Locked Club featuring Boys Noize	PZDC	Ones and Zeros

=== Remixes ===
List of remixed singles
Year	Title	Artist	Remix title
2004	"My Way"	Kid Alex	Kid Alex Boys Noize Mix
2004	"Was Wir Machen"	Spillsbury	Kid Alex Boys Noize Remix
2005	"Banquet"	Bloc Party	Boys Noize Vox Mix; Boys Noize Dub
2005	"Auf Der Lauer Aua Aua"	Göpfrich and Gerlach	
2005	"Shadowbreaker"	John Starlight	Boys Noize Remix No 1 Boys Noize Remix No 2
2005	"Everyday I Love You Less and Less"	Kaiser Chiefs	
2005	"My Conversation"	Kid Alex	
2005	"Daily Disco"	Lützenkirchen	
2006	"Personal Jesus"	Depeche Mode	Boys Noize Classic
2006	"Fine Dining with the Future"	Foreign Islands	
2006	"Frau"	I-Robots	
2006	"All I Wanna Do Is Break Some Hearts"	Kreeps	Boys Noize Remix No. 1 Boys Noize Remix No. 2
2006	"Bom Bom Bom"	Living Things	Boys Noize Vox Remix; Boys Noize Great Dub
2006	"Dudun-Dun"	Para One	
2006	"The Acid Never Lies"	Riot In Belgium	909 D1sco Remix
2006	"Le Disko"	Shiny Toy Guns	Boys Noize Fire Mix; Boys Noize Fire Dub
2006	"Cocotte"	Teenage Bad Girl	Boys Noize Rework
2006	"Move My Body"	Tiga	
2007	"Alloy Mental"	Alloy Mental	Boynoize Remix
2007	"My Moon My Man"	Feist	Boys Noize Classic Mix
2007	"Phantom Pt. II"	Justice	Boys Noize Vox Mix; Boys Noize 'Unreleased' Turbine
2007	"Putting Holes in Happiness"	Marilyn Manson	
2007	"Sexual Eruption"	Snoop Dogg	
2008	"Say Whoa"	A-Trak	
2008	"Arcadia"	Apparat	Boys Noize Reprise
2008	"& Down"	Boys Noize	Siriusmo vs. Boys Noize Mix
2008	"Horsepower"	C. J. Bolland	
2008	"Lights & Music"	Cut Copy	Boys Noize Happy Birthday Remix
2008	"It Has Been Said"	Darmstadt	
2008	"Love Can't Turn Around"	Farley 'Jackmaster' Funk	Boys Noize Started Like This Mix
2008	"When You're Around"	Frankmusik	
2008	"Working Together"	Gonzales	Boys Noize Vox Mix; Boys Noize Dub Mix
2008	"Inordertodance"	Housemeister	
2008	"Focker"	Late of the Pier	Boys Noize Terror Re-Did
2008	"This Is Acid"	Maurice	Boys Noize Re-work
2008	"L'amour et la Violence"	Sébastien Tellier	Boys Noize Main Version; Boys Noize Euro Mix
2008	"Mein Neues Fahrrad"	Siriusmo	Boys Noize Edit
2008	"The Geeks Were Right"	The Faint	Boys Noize vs. D.I.M. Mix
2009	"Wrong"	Depeche Mode	D.I.M. vs. Boys Noize Remix
2009	"Dirty & Hard"	Djedjotronic featuring Spoek	Boys Noize's Jump If You're an Idiot Mix
2009	"You Don't Know Love"	Editors	Boys Noize Classic Mix
2009	"Happy Up Here"	Röyksopp	
2009	"Boom Boom Pow"	The Black Eyed Peas	Let the Beat Rock (Boys Noize Megamix feat. 50 Cent); Let the Beat Rock (Boys Noize Megamix feat. Gucci Mane)
2009	"Mirror Error"	The Faint	Das Glow Remix Boys Noize Edit
2010	"Trick Pony"	Charlotte Gainsbourg	
2010	"Good Day Today"	David Lynch	
2010	"Hot-n-Fun"	N.E.R.D featuring Nelly Furtado	
2010	"Invisible Light"	Scissor Sisters	
2010	"Swoon"	The Chemical Brothers	Boys Noize Summer Mix; Boys Noize Summer Instrumental
2011	"End of Line"	Daft Punk	
2011	"Music is Awesome"	Housemeister	
2011	"Monkey Flip"	Modeselektor featuring Nazizi and Abbas	
2012	"Nasty"	Spank Rock	Scntst Remix – Boys Noize Re-Did
2012	"Astral Projection"	Strip Steve	Destructo Remix – Boys Noize Edit
2012	"Wisdom to the Wise"	Dave Clarke	Boys Noize Wild Pitch Remix
2012	"Mein Herz brennt"	Rammstein	
2013	"Kernkraft 7000"	Brad Lamborghini & John G	Boys Noize Edit
2013	"Wisdom to the Wise (Red 2)"	Dave Clarke	Boys Noize Wild Pitch Mix
2013	"Sexy Socialite"	Chromeo	
2013	"Bad Girls"	Donna Summer	Boys Noize Club Mix
2013	"ProtoVision"	Kavinsky	
2013	"Axis"	Pet Shop Boys	
2013	"Nothing But Pleasure"	Tom Rowlands	Boys Noize Pressure Fix
2014	"Feel Of Love"	Tensnake & Jacques Lu Cont featuring Jamie Lidell	Boys Noize & Djedjotronic Remix
2014	"Ich Bin Meine Maschine"	Atom™	
2014	"Smokin & Drinkin"	Danny Brown	Boys Noize Smokin Mix
2014	"My Little Universe"	Depeche Mode	
2015	"Bugatti"	Tiga	Boys Noize Acid Mix
2015	"Very First Breath"	Hudson Mohawke featuring Irfane	Boys Noize Classic Mix; Boys Noize Turbine Mix
2016	"Mouth to Mouth"	Audion	
2016	"Planet Rock"	Afrika Bambaataa & The Soul Sonic Force	
2016	"Midnight"	Boys Noize	Boys Noize & Mr. Oizo Handbraekes Remix
2016	"Euphoria"	Boys Noize	Boys Noize x MXM Remix
2016	"2 Live"	Boys Noize	Boys Noize Silent Mix
2016	"Kind"	Poliça	
2016	"Secret Downloading"	Craig Amstrong	Boys Noize Remix 2
2017	"Randy"	Justice	
2017	"Stonefist"	Health	Boys Noize x Health x Empress Of RMX
2017	"Ibifornia"	Cassius	
2017	"Als wär's das letzte Mal"	D.A.F.	
2017	"Flying High"	Byron Stingily	Boys Noize 909 Rework
2018	"Chabos wissen wer der Babo ist"	Haftbefehl	
2018	"B-Plug"	Dense & Pika	Boys Noize Hausmix; Boys Noize Rawmix
2019	"Tunnel"	TWR72	Boys Noize Rework
2019	"House of Pax"	Bazz	Boys Noize Rework
2020	"Blade Runner"	Autotune	
2020	"Chapel"	Willaris. K featuring WaveIQ	
2020	"Layle"	Omar Souleyman	
2021	"Tasty"	Shygirl	Boys Noize Remix; Boys Noize Extended Dub
2021	"Stargon"	A. G. Cook	
2021	"All I Want"	Boys Noize featuring Jake Shears	Boys Noize Extended NRG Remix
2021	"Reincarnate"	REIN	Boys Noize Dub Mix
2021	"Release Me"	REIN	Boys Noize Dub Mix
2021	"Low"	Chet Faker	
2021	"Rage"	Pussy Riot	
2022	"Zick Zack"	Rammstein	
2022	"Miriam"	Curses	
2022	"Real Talk"	Anna Lunoe & Touch Sensitive	
2022	"Wolf"	Yeah Yeah Yeahs	
2022	"Home"	Solomun	
2023	"Kepko"	Sega Bodega	Boys Noize Dreamix
2023	"Chastity"	Pussy Riot and Boys Noize featuring Alice Glass	
2023	"Venus"	Bananarama	Boys Noize Rework
2023	"Take Down the House"	Promiseland	
2023	"Hotel Pool"	David Löhlein	DJ Swisherman & Boys Noize Remix
2024	"Call Me Shadow"	Akini Jing	
2025	"Not In Your Mouth None Of Your Business"	Peaches	
2026	"A Question of Trust"	Nine Inch Nails	
2026	"Ghost In The Machine"	Nine Inch Nails	
2026	"What Have You Done?"	Nine Inch Nails	
2026	"The Mandalorian and Grogu"	Ludwig Göransson	
2026	"Dracula"	Tame Impala	Jennie Remix - Boys Noize Disko Version
2026	"Fuck the Speakerz Up"	Isoxo	
