= Out of the Black (Boys Noize album) =

Studio album by Boys Noize
- Released: 16 October 2012
- Genre: Electronic
- Length: 58:37
- Labels: Boysnoize Records; Ingrooves
- Producers: Boys Noize; Siriusmo

Boys Noize chronology
Power (2009)	Out of the Black (2012)	Octave Minds (2014)

Professional ratings
Aggregate scores
Source	Rating
Metacritic	67/100
Review scores
Source	Rating
AllMusic	4/5 stars
BBC Music	favorable
Clash	8/10
DIY	5/10
Exclaim!	favorable
Mixmag	4/5 stars
MusicOMH	3.5/5 stars
Now	3/5 stars

Out of the Black is the third studio album by German electronic music artist Boys Noize, released on 16 October 2012 by Boysnoize Records and Ingrooves. It was named by Spin as one of the 20 best dance albums of 2012.

== Track listing ==
No.	Title	Writer(s)	Length
1.	"What You Want"	Boys Noize	5:12
2.	"XTC"	Boys Noize	4:38
3.	"Missile"	Boys Noize	4:38
4.	"Ich R U"	Boys Noize	5:23
5.	"Rocky 2"	Boys Noize	3:18
6.	"Circus Full of Clowns" (featuring Gizzle)	Boys Noize, Glenda Proby	3:36
7.	"Conchord" (featuring Siriusmo)	Boys Noize, Moritz Friedrich	6:09
8.	"Touch It"	Boys Noize	3:27
9.	"Reality"	Boys Noize	7:00
10.	"Merlin"	Boys Noize, Chilly Gonzales	7:08
11.	"Stop"	Boys Noize	4:57
12.	"Got It" (featuring Snoop Dogg)	Boys Noize, Moritz Friedrich, Glenda Proby	3:12

iTunes edition bonus tracks
No.	Title	Length
13.	"Ich Jack"	4:25
14.	"Distant Lover"	3:54

Australian edition bonus tracks
No.	Title	Length
13.	"Ich Jack"	4:25
14.	"Yeah"	5:22

Japanese edition bonus track
No.	Title	Length
13.	"Yellow" (featuring Siriusmo)	4:59

== Charts ==
Chart	Peak position
US Top Dance/Electronic Albums (Billboard)	23
US Heatseekers Albums (Billboard)	42
