= +/- (album) =

Studio album by Boys Noize
- Released: 24 September 2021
- Genre: Electronic
- Length: 58:31
- Label: Boysnoize Records
- Producers: Boys Noize; Ghost Culture; Abra

Boys Noize chronology
Mayday (2016)	+/- (2021)	Nine Inch Noize (2026)

+/- (pronounced "polarity") is the fifth studio album by German electronic music artist Boys Noize, released on 24 September 2021 by Boysnoize Records. It features guest appearances which include Rico Nasty, Ghost Culture, Jake Shears, Abra, and Chilly Gonzales.

== Track listing ==
No.	Title	Length
1.	"Close"	4:20
2.	"Love & Validation"	4:09
3.	"Girl Crush" (featuring Rico Nasty)	3:48
4.	"Greenpoint"	3:24
5.	"Polarity" (featuring Ghost Culture)	3:52
6.	"XYXY"	3:43
7.	"Affection"	3:33
8.	"All I Want" (featuring Jake Shears)	3:09
9.	"Detune"	3:46
10.	"IU" (featuring Corbin)	4:12
11.	"Xpress Yourself"	4:45
12.	"Sperm"	4:48
13.	"Nude" (featuring Tommy Cash)	3:49
14.	"Ride or Die" (featuring Chilly Gonzales)	3:44
15.	"Act 9" (featuring Vinson)	3:29
