= The Shoes (French band) =

French electronic rock duo

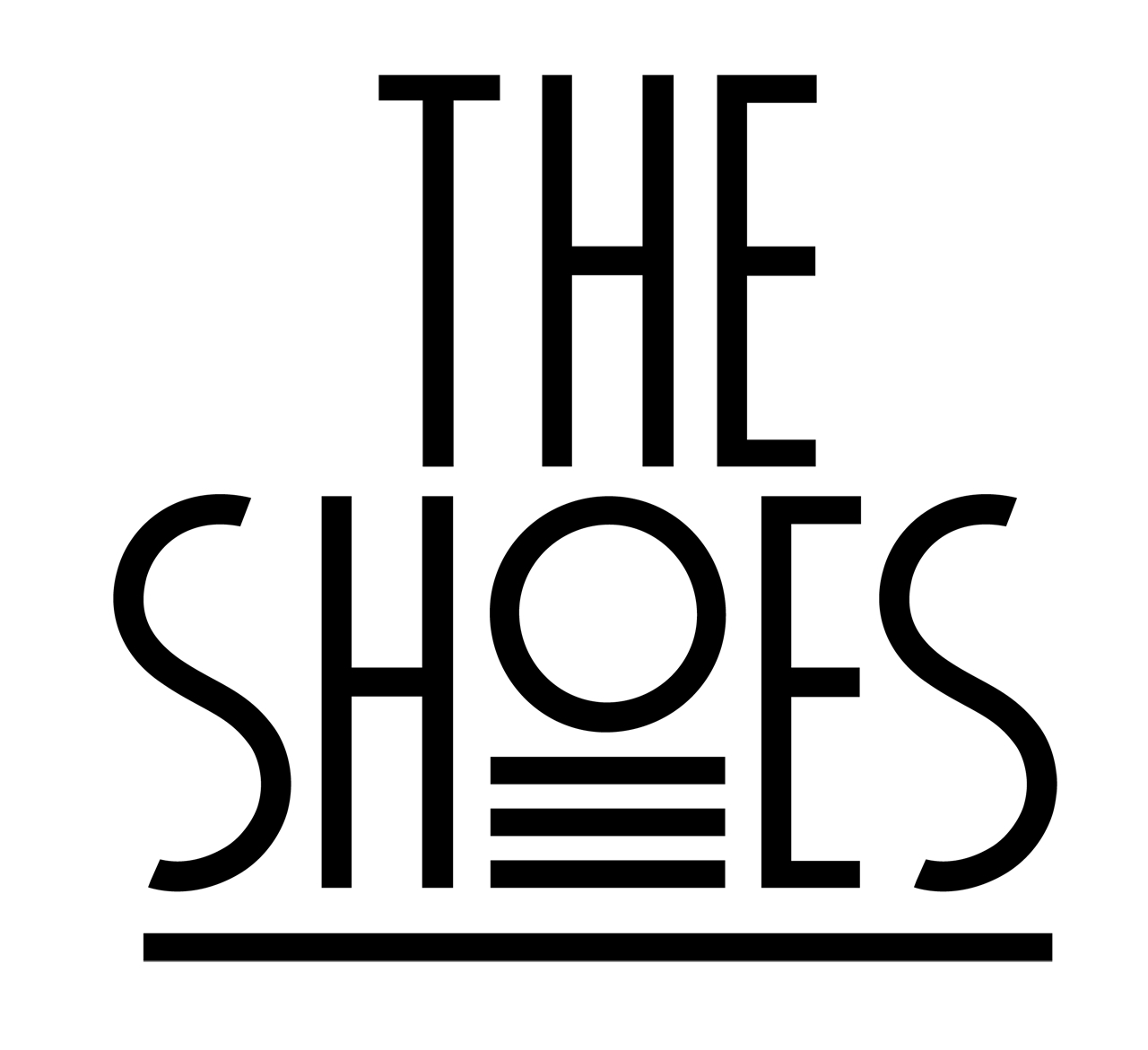
- Logo of the band

Background information
- Origin: Reims, France
- Genres: Electro-rock; post-punk revival; electropop; alternative dance; electronica
- Years active: 2011–present
- Labels: Green United Music Polydor Records
- Members: Guillaume Brière; Benjamin Lebeau

The Shoes are a French electro-rock duo originally from Reims created in 2007. It consists of Guillaume Brière and Benjamin Lebeau, who are both songwriters and producers. Before creating the concurrent group in 2007, Benjamin and Guillaume were the two members of The Film, a rock band that formed in Bordeaux in 2005. Guillaume Brière also formed the duo G. Vump along with Brodinski from Reims. Brière is also known under the alias Vladimir Cauchemar since 2017.

== History ==
On March 7, 2011, the band released their first album Crack My Bones, on the independent French label Green United Music. The album includes ten original tracks, including nine in collaboration with French and international artists such as Esser, Wave Machines, Primary 1, Anthonin Ternant (from The Bewitched Hands) and Cock'n'Bull Kid.

At the same year, several of the songs on the album also resulted in the making of video clips: Cover Your Eyes (directed by We are from LA), Wastin' Time (directed by Yoann Lemoine) and Stay the Same (directed by Daniel Wolfe). The Shoes performed at La Cigale during a sold-out concert on 9 November 2011. They were then among the ten finalists of the Constantin Prize in 2011 and won the 'Innovation Award' at the UK Music Video Awards 2011 with the clip Cover Your Eyes. The album Crack My Bones was placed in ninth place of the ranking of the "100 best albums of the year 2011" by the magazine Les Inrockuptibles.

They performed to Emilia Clarke on Le Grand Journal featuring their friend Peter "Dennis" Brown of the project Postaal. Postaal went on to have limited success of its own.

== Discography ==
=== Albums ===
Scandal (2009, Green United Music)

1. New York (feat. Boy Crisis)
2. Baby Baby
3. Crack My Bones
4. Let's Go
5. '7 AM
6. Bored
7. Whips Like a Clap
8. Investigator
9. What Kind of Girl?
10. America
11. Knock Out
12. America (Brodinski Remix)
13. Amknock Out (80Kidz Remix)
14. America (Yes Giantess' Mac Doe Remix)

Crack My Bones (2011, Green United Music)

1. Stay the Same (featuring Esser)
2. Cover Your Eyes (featuring Wave Machines)
3. People Movin' (featuring Primary 1)
4. Wastin' Time (featuring Esser)
5. Time to Dance (featuring Anthonin Ternant)
6. Cliché (featuring Cock'n'Bullkid)
7. Crack My Bones (featuring Anthonin Ternant)
8. Bored (featuring Anthonin Ternant)
9. The Wolf Under the Moon (featuring Anthonin Ternant)
10. Investigator

Chemicals (2015, Green United Music)

1. Submarine (featuring Blaine Harrison)
2. Made For You (featuring Esser)
3. Drifted (featuring SAGE)
4. Lost In London (featuring Petite Noir)
5. Vortex Of Love (featuring Blaine Harrison)
6. Us & I (featuring Esser)
7. Give It Away (featuring Postaal)
8. 15 Instead & Brown (featuring Mikill Pane)
9. Feed The Ghost (featuring Blue Daisy, Amateur Best & Black Atlass)
10. Whistle

=== EP and singles ===
Knock Out (2008, 50 Bones)

1. Knock Out
2. Red Light

Stade de Reims (2008, Green United Music)

1. America
2. America (Brodinski Remix)
3. Keep That Control (Rockin'Shoes Mix)
4. Keep That Control (Yuksek Lost Control Remix)

Oh Lord (2009, 50 Bones)

1. Oh Lord
2. People Movin'

People Movin' (2009, Green United Music)

1. People Movin' (featuring Primary 1)
2. Bored (featuring Anthonin Ternant)
3. People Movin' (Siriusmo Remix)

Stay the Same (2010, Green United Music)

1. Stay the Same (Original Version)
2. Stay the Same (featuring Der Kreisel)
3. Stay the Same (Isolee Remix)
4. Stay the Same (Adam Kesher Remix)
5. Stay the Same (Siriusmo & Jan Driver Remix)
6. Stay the Same (Harvard Bass Remix)
7. Stay the Same (Étienne de Crécy Remix)
8. Stay the Same (Donovans Remix)

Time to Dance (2012, Green United Music)

1. Time to Dance (Extended Version)
2. Time to Dance (Original Version)
3. Time to Dance (SebastiAn Remix)
4. Time to Dance (DDDXIE Remix)
5. Time to Tanz (Esser Remix)
6. Time to Dance (Rocky Piano Mix)

Give It Away (2015)

1960's Horror ft. Dominic Lord (2016)

=== Productions and synchros ===
- Shakira – Loca (arrangements and additional production)
- Gaëtan Roussel – Ginger (arrangements, production and additional production)
- Mammuth – OST (composed with Gaëtan Roussel)
- Julien Doré – Kiss Me Forever (composition & writing)
- Raphael – Pacific 31 (arrangements, production and artistic production)
- Cœur de Pirate – Golden Baby (arrangements, production and artistic production)
- Lilly Wood and the Prick – My Best (additional production)
- Yuksek – Living on the Edge of Time (arrangements and composition)
- Philippe Katerine – Té-lé-phone (radio edit)
- Woodkid – Iron (production)

Synchros

- People Movin' for Jean-Charles de Castelbajac défilé (spring–summer 2011)
- Bored in the 3rd season of Gossip Girl
- Time to Dance in Les Infidèles (movie, 2012)

=== Awards and nominations ===
Antville Music Video Awards

Year	Nominee / work	Award	Result
2011	"Stay the Same"	Best Cinematography	Nominated
2011	"Stay the Same"	Best Narrative	Nominated
2012	"Time to Dance"	Best Narrative	Won
2012	"Time to Dance"	Best Editing	Won
2012	"Time to Dance"	Video of the Year	Nominated

Camerimage

Year	Nominee / work	Award	Result	Ref.
2012	"Time to Dance"	Best Music Video	Nominated	

UK Music Video Awards

Year	Nominee / work	Award	Result
2011	"Cover Your Eyes"	The Innovation Award	Won
2011	"Stay the Same"	Best Rock/Indie Video	Nominated
2012	"Time to Dance"	Best Editing	Nominated
2012	"Time to Dance"	Best Art Direction	Nominated
2012	"Time to Dance"	Best Telecine	Nominated
2012	"Time to Dance"	Best Editing	Won
2012	"Time to Dance"	Best Dance Video	Won
2015	"Feed the Ghost"	Best Lyric Video	Won
2016	"Submarine" (feat. Blaine Harrison)	Best Alternative Video	Nominated
2016	"Drifted"	Best Alternative Video	Nominated
2016	"1960's Horror" (feat. Dominic Lord)	Best Alternative Video	Nominated
2016	"1960's Horror" (feat. Dominic Lord)	Best Editing	Nominated
