= Siriusmo =

German record producer

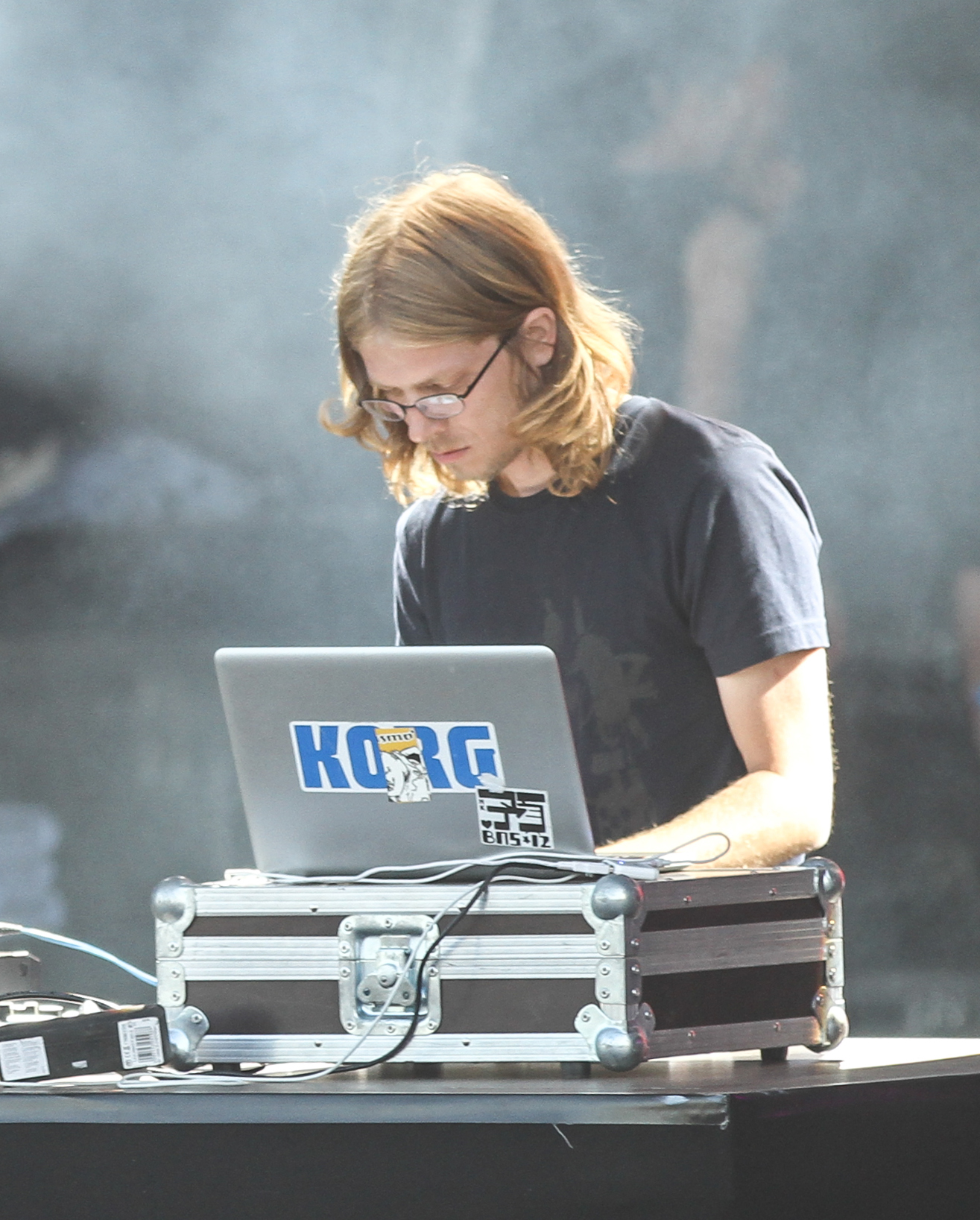
- Siriusmo performing at Melt! Festival 2013

Background information
- Born: Moritz Friedrich; East-Berlin
- Origin: Germany
- Genres: Electronica, techno, electro, house
- Years active: 2000–present
- Labels: Monkeytown Records, Mad Benton Records, Bungalow, Endangered Music, Sonar Kollektiv, Grand Petrol Recordings, Exploited, Eye Industries, Boyz Noize Records
- Website: siriusmo.de

Moritz Friedrich (born 1976 in East-Berlin), better known by his stage name Siriusmo, is a Berlin-based German record producer. His tracks can be broadly defined as electronic, and are formulated with a variety of samples.

== Biography ==
Growing up, Friedrich was influenced by artists such as Led Zeppelin, Jimi Hendrix, Squarepusher, and Aphex Twin. The first band that Friedrich is known to have been in was a group called Sirius. After growing bored of playing the same songs, Moritz left Sirius, taking the band name with him. He based his new pseudonym around the old band name, adding "mo" from his first name to create Sirius.Mo, and later, Siriusmo.

Throughout his career, which began with the single "Ne Me Quitte Pas" in 2000, Siriusmo has recorded prolifically. His music has been released with a number of different labels, including Grand Petrol Recordings and Boysnoize Records. The majority of his releases have been through Monkeytown Records, a record label founded by Modeselektor with the goal of gently forcing Moritz to work on an album.

He has also released a large number of remixes for artists including Gossip, Digitalism, Scissor Sisters, Simian Mobile Disco, Boys Noize, and Sido. His debut album Mosaik was released in February 2011 on Monkeytown Records, and provides a mix of genres at the intersection of techno, house, and hip hop.

Siriusmo has worked consistently with the Berlin-based graphical artist Jens Tümmel in the creation of his album art, associated videos, and merchandise. Jens' artistic style can especially be seen on many of Siriusmo's album covers.

Six years after the release of the album Comic, an official video for the track "Doppelklick" was released by Siriusmo. Niels Rost, a Berlin-based graphic designer, animated the video using Microsoft Paint, a process which took a number of years to complete.

In October 2025, released the single "Koko", which samples the purported last words of Koko, a gorilla who practiced parts of American Sign Language. This was followed by the release of Siriusmo's first album in eight years, Buletten & Blumen, in November 2025.

On 29th September 2025, Quentin Dupieux (who has collaborated with Siriusmo as Mr. Oizo) announced that Siriusmo had composed the soundtrack of his movie Full Phil.

== Personal life ==
Moritz was born in 1976 and grew up in Friedrichshagen in East Berlin; he has two brothers and a sister. Besides his work as a producer, he has worked as a graffiti artist, a children's book illustrator, a wall mural designer, a plasterer, and a carpenter.

== Discography ==
=== Studio albums ===
| Title | Album details |
|---|---|
| Mosaik | Released: 25 February 2011 (Europe); Formats: CD, LP, Digital; Label: Monkeytown Records |
| Enthusiast | Released: 14 June 2013 (Germany); Formats: CD, LP, Digital; Label: Monkeytown Records |
| Comic | Released: 15 September 2017; Formats: CD, LP, Digital; Label: Monkeytown Records |
| Buletten & Blumen | Released: 21 November 2025; Formats: CD, LP, Digital; Label: Monkeytown Records |

=== Compilation albums ===
| Title | Album details |
|---|---|
| Pearls & Embarrassments: 2000-2010 | Released: 24 June 2011 (Germany); Formats: CD; Label: Monkeytown Records |

=== Extended plays and singles ===
| Title | Album details |
|---|---|
| Ne Me Quitte Pas | Released as "Sirius.Mo"; Released: 27 September 2000 (Germany); Formats: 12"; Label: Mad Benton Records |
| "Movin To That" | Released under the alias "Birdie"; Released: 2001; Formats: 12", Digital; Label: Kontor RecordsEdel Records |
| ...Is Wunderbar! | Released: 2002 (Germany); Formats: 12"; Label: Bungalow |
| U Again | Released: June 2003 (Germany); Formats: 12"; Label: Endangered Music |
| Sirius EP | Released: 22 September 2003 (Germany); Formats: 12"; Label: Sonar Kollektiv |
| Immer Wieder | Released: 25 April 2005 (Germany); Formats: 12", Digital; Label: Grand Petrol Recordings |
| W.O.W. | Released: July 2005 (Germany); Formats: 12"; Label: Grand Petrol Recordings |
| MiniRock | Released: 2006 (Germany); Formats: 12"; Label: Grand Petrol Recordings |
| Allthegirls | Released: 25 February 2008 (Germany); Formats: 12", CD, Digital; Label: Exploited |
| Diskoding | Released: 18 March 2008 (Germany); Formats: 12", CD, Digital; Label: Boysnoize Records |
| "23" (split single w/ Harry Axt) | Released: 30 April 2009 (Germany); Formats: 7", Digital; Label: Grand Petrol Recordings |
| The Uninvited Guest | Released: 13 July 2009 (Germany); Formats: 12", CD, Digital; Label: Monkeytown Records |
| The Plasterer Of Love | Released: 2 July 2010 (Europe); Formats: 12", CD, Digital; Label: Monkeytown Records |
| "Hot Box / Mbox" | Released: 16 August 2010 (Europe); Formats: Digital; Label: Eye Industries |
| "Sirimande / Feed My Meatmachine" | Released: 25 March 2011 (Germany); Formats: 12", Digital; Label: Monkeytown Records |
| "Feromonikon / Signal" | Released: 14 January 2011 (Germany); Formats: 12", Digital; Label: Monkeytown Records |
| "Dancing Monkey / Fly High" (split single w/ eLan) | Released: 16 April 2011 (Germany); Formats: 7"; Label: Monkeytown Records |
| Dr. Beak's Rantanplant | Released: 6 April 2012 (Germany); Formats: 12", Digital; Label: Monkeytown Records |
| "Jaja / Muckefuck" | Released: 19 April 2014; Formats: 10"; Label: Monkeytown Records |
| "Geilomant" | Released: 25 August 2017; Formats: Digital; Label: Monkeytown Records |
| Where Was I? EP | Released: 8 September 2017 (Germany); Formats: LP; Label: Monkeytown Records |
| Zeit EP | Released: 12 December 2018 (Germany); Formats: EP, Digital; Label: Monkeytown Records |
| "Koko" | Released: 31 October 2025; Formats: Digital; Label: Monkeytown Records |
| "Hongkong House (feat. Liu's Family)" | Released: 7 November 2025; Formats: Digital; Label: Monkeytown Records |

=== Collaborations ===
| Title | Collaborator | Album/Track details |
|---|---|---|
| "Tequila" (Pat C. & Sirius Mo) | Pat C. | Released: 4 June 2003; Formats: CD; Label: Rambling Records |
| Here We Cum | Bolt (Siriusmo and Jan Siebert) | Released: 2004 (Germany); Formats: 12"; Label: Grand Petrol Recordings |
| "Nightshift (feat. Sirius Mo)" | Autotune | Released: 2006 (Germany); Formats: 12"; Label: Fumakilla |
| "Ick Hab Wat Bessret Vor! / Trommellied" | Dana | Released: 8 December 2006 (Germany); Formats: 12", Digital; Label: Bungalow |
| "Déboutonner (feat. Siriusmo)" (from the album Happy Birthday!) | Modeselektor | Released: 10 September 2007 (Germany); Formats: LP, CD, Digital; Label: BPitch Control |
| "Pale (feat. Siriusmo)" (from the EP When Saints Go Machine) | When Saints Go Machine | Released: 2008 (Denmark); Formats: 12", CD; Label: EMI |
| "Siriusmoto (Siriusmo Remixed By Marsimoto)" | Marsimoto | Released: 24 December 2010 (Germany); Formats: MP3; Label: Monkeytown Records |
| "Let's Do It Together (feat. Siriusmo)" (from the album Amatilda) | Jan Driver | Released: 6 September 2011 (Germany); Formats: LP, CD; Label: Boysnoize Records |
| "Point & Shoot (feat. Siriusmo)" (from the album Sorry, We're Open) | Bonaparte | Released: 16 August 2012 (Germany); Formats: LP, CD; Label: Staatsakt |
| "Conchord (feat. Siriusmo)", "Yellow (feat. Siriusmo)" (from the album Out of the Black) | Boys Noize | Released: 15 October 2012; Formats: LP, CD; Label: Boysnoize Records |
| "Immer kurz davor (feat. Siriusmo)" (from the album 21 Again Collaborations, Pt. 2) | Mouse On Mars | Released: 31 October 2014; Formats: LP, CD, Digital; Label: Monkeytown Records |
| "On My Case (feat. Siriusmo)" | Gene Siewing | Released: 23 February 2015; Formats: 12", Digital; Label: Intent |
| "Circus" (from the album Electronica 2: The Heart Of Noise) | Jean-Michel Jarre | Released: 6 May 2016 (Europe); Formats: LP, CD, Digital; Labels: Aero Productions, Columbia Records, Sony Music Entertainment |
| "All Wet (feat. Siriusmo)" (from the album All Wet) | Mr. Oizo | Released: 30 September 2016; Formats: LP, CD, Digital; Labels: Because Music, Ed Banger Records |
| "Bubblegum" (credited as Moritz Friedrich) | Kai Lüftner | Released: 31 August 2018; Label: Rotz 'N' Roll Musikverlag |
| "Marilyn" | Marteria | Released: 11 June 2021; Label: Green Berlin |
| "Silly Walk" | Nobodys Face | Released: 25 August 2023; Label: Block Opera |
| "HOOYOO with Siriusmo" | Farhot | Released: 6 June 2025; Label: Kabul Fire Records |

=== Production for other artists ===
| Title | Artist | Album/Track details |
|---|---|---|
| "Popsong" | Die Raketen | Released: 2006 (Germany); Formats: CD; Labels: Freundschaft Musik |
| "Atomic Fusion" | RQM | Released: 2010 (Germany); Format: LP; Label: Not On Label |
| "La Musique", "Le Grand Saut", "Unillusion" (from the album Safari Disco Club) | Yelle | Released: 14 March 2011 (France); Formats: LP, CD, Digital; Label: V2 Records International |
| "I Love It (feat. Zion.T & Boys Noize)" (from the album Coup d'Etat) | G-Dragon | Released: 5 September 2013; Formats: LP, CD, Digital; Label: YG |
| "Safari", "Schwächen", "Natascha", "Kaugummi" (from the album Wechselt Die Beleuchtung) | Laing | Released: 11 September 2014 (Germany); Formats: LP, CD; Label: Island Records |
| Jenseits Von Köpenick | Romano | Released: 11 September 2015 (Germany, Austria & Switzerland); Formats: LP; Labels: Virgin Records |
| Copyshop | Romano | Released: 8 September 2017; Formats: CD; Labels: Vertigo Berlin |
| "Tick" | Romano | Released: 17 July 2020; Formats: Digital; Labels: recordJet |
| "Ein Mann für gewisse Stunden" | Romano | Released: 3 December 2021; Formats: Digital; Labels: Nonstop Pop Records |
| "Schrei der Wildnis" | Romano | Released: 29 July 2022; Formats: Digital; Labels: Nonstop Pop Records |
| "Magical" | Romano | Released: 9 December 2022; Formats: Digital; Labels: Nonstop Pop Records |
| "Samurai (feat. Alexander Marcus)" | Romano | Released: 27 January 2023; Formats: Digital; Labels: Nonstop Pop Records |
| "Zeit für Emotion" | Romano | Released: 14 February 2023; Formats: Digital; Labels: Nonstop Pop Records |
| "Love, Peace & Happiness", "Marilyn", "Traffic", "Strandkind", "DMT" (from the album 5. Dimension) | Marteria | Released: 15 October 2021; Formats: LP, CD; Label: Four Music |
| Vulkano Romano | Romano | Released: 24 March 2023; Formats: Digital; Labels: Nonstop Pop Records |
| "Der Arpeggiator", "Ahoj!", "Ravedave", "Riding Low" (from the album No. 2) | Erobique | Released: 16 June 2023; Formats: LP, CD, Digital; Label: Mr. Mellow's Music |
| "Marlboro Mann" | ÄTNA & Romano | Released: 11 April 2025; Formats: Digital; Labels: Nonstop Pop Records |
| Körper (Some tracks were also written by Moritz) | Romano | Released: 20 February 2026; Formats: Digital; Labels: Nonstop Pop Records |

=== Music videos ===
| Title | Year | Director(s) | Flute maker |
|---|---|---|---|
| das macht man nicht (One doesn't do that) | 2006 | Andres Fuentes Cannobbio | |
| Wow | 2010 | Martin Waltz | |
| Einmal in der Woche schreien | 2010 | Rolf Bremer | |
| Signal | 2010 | Rolf Bremer | |
| Loosie | 2010 | Unknown | |
| Tränen Aus Bier | 2013 | Rolf Bremer | |
| Plastic Hips | 2013 | Rolf Bremer | |
| Itchy / Cornerboy | 2013 | Jakob Grunert, Raphael Beinder | |
| Momento Mori | 2017 | Rolf Bremer | |
| Comic | 2017 | Jens Tümmel, Maurice Croissier, Rolf Bremer | |
| Important Movie Scene | 2017 | Jakob Grunert | |
| Wixn | 2017 | Uros Djurovic (Studio Brigant) | |
| Niemand bringt Marten um by Marteria | 2021 | Jakob Grunert | |
| Ein Mann für gewisse Stunden by Romano | 2021 | Moritz Friedrich | |
| Schrei der Wildnis by Romano | 2022 | Dominik Galizia | Moritz Friedrich |
| Doppelklick | 2023 | Niels Rost | |
| Hong Kong House | 2025 | Friendly Liu | |
| In der Klemme | 2025 | Sascha Bachmann | |
| KoKo | 2025 | Rolf Bremer, @nizzarob | |

=== Remixes ===
| Artist | Track | Year |
|---|---|---|
| KHS | "Flausen" (Sirius.Mo.Remix) | 2001 |
| Flash & Gordon | "Ich Denk Nicht Immer" | 2002 |
| Nadine Purrmann | "Warum Bist Du Gegangen" (Sirius Mo/Disco Club Remix) | 2002 |
| Los Fancy Free | "Voltage is OK!" | 2003 |
| Bomfunk MC's | "Hypnotic" (Jan Driver & Siriusmo Doin It Again! Remix) | 2004 |
| Ben Mono | "Protection" | 2004 |
| Chikinki | "Ether Radio" (Jan Driver & Siriusmo - Bolt Remix) | 2005 |
| Christian Bruhn | "Planet Der Kranken (Planet of Sick People)" | 2005 |
| Christian Bruhn | "Lass Uns Fliegen (Let Us Fly)" | 2005 |
| Jan Driver | "Bulldogg" ("Bullthug" (Sirusmo Remix) & "Bullfrog" (Sirusmo Remix)) | 2006 |
| Modeselektor | "Silikon" | 2006 |
| Pat C. | "Klapprad" | 2006 |
| Jahcoozi | "Double Barrel Name" | 2007 |
| Simian Mobile Disco | "It's the Beat" | 2007 |
| Boys Noize | "& Down" (Siriusmo vs. Boys Noize Mix) | 2008 |
| David Rubato | "Circuit" | 2008 |
| Digitalism | "Echoes" | 2008 |
| Housemeister | "What You Want" | 2008 |
| Idiotproof | "Gorilla" (Siriusmo's Ass of the Baboon Remix) | 2008 |
| Puppetmastaz | "So Scandalous" | 2008 |
| Sido | "Carmen" | 2008 |
| Yelle | "Les Femmes" | 2008 |
| Adam Freeland | "Rock On" | 2009 |
| Bag Raiders | "Shooting Stars" | 2009 |
| Bonaparte | "Do You Want to Party" (Siriusmo Remuch) | 2009 |
| Bonaparte | "Who Took the Pill?" (Siriusmo's Reprise) | 2009 |
| Chromeo | "Night by Night" | 2009 |
| Modeselektor | "200007" | 2009 |
| Modeselektor | "Untitled" | 2009 |
| Munk | "The Rat Race" | 2009 |
| Munk | "The Rat Race" (Siriusmo Remix Instrumental) | 2009 |
| The Shoes (feat. Primary 1) | "People Movin" | 2009 |
| Bodi Bill | "I Like Holden Caulfield" | 2010 |
| Bodi Bill | "Tip Toe Walk" | 2010 |
| Bonaparte | "Computer In Love" (Siriusmo In Love Remix) | 2010 |
| Breakbot (feat. Irfane) | "Baby I'm Yours" | 2010 |
| Breakbot (feat. Irfane) | "Baby I'm Yours" (Siriusmo Instrumental Remix) | 2010 |
| Clare Maguire | "Ain't Nobody" (Siriusmo & Jan Driver Remix) | 2010 |
| Gossip | "Heavy Cross" | 2010 |
| Machinedrum | "Let It" | 2010 |
| Scissor Sisters | "Invisible Light" | 2010 |
| The Shoes (feat. Benjamin Esser) | "Stay the Same" (Siriusmo & Jan Driver Remix) | 2010 |
| Vandroid | "Master & Slave" (Siriusmo 'Slave Disco' Remix) | 2010 |
| Boys Noize | "Kontact Me" | 2011 |
| Laing | "Morgens Immer Müde" | 2011 |
| Zombie Nation | "Chickflick" | 2011 |
| Deichkind | "Bück Dich Hoch" (Siriusmo Haltdiedeadlineein RMX) | 2012 |
| Der Tourist (feat. Friedrich Liechtenstein) | "Supergeil" | 2012 |
| Icke & ER | "Finanzpolka" | 2012 |
| Jimmy Somerville | "Kite" | 2012 |
| Taku Inoue | "Night Falls (Ending)" | 2012 |
| Kid Simius | "Costa del Sol" | 2014 |
| Bilderbuch | "OM" | 2015 |
| Hundred Waters | "[Animal]" | 2015 |
| Moderat | "Eating Hooks" | 2016 |

== Filmography ==
=== Soundtracks ===
| Film Name | Year | Role |
|---|---|---|
| The Centrifuge Brain Project | 2011 | End Titles Music |
| Next Door | 2021 | Composer (as Moritz Friedrich, with Jakob Grunert) |
| Full Phil | 2026 | Composer |

== Awards and nominations ==
| Award Ceremony | Year | Nominee/Work | Category | Result |
|---|---|---|---|---|
| Berlin Music Video Awards | 2024 | Doppelklick feat. Mr. Oizo | Best Trashy | Nomination |
