= Yunè Pinku =

Irish musician (born 2002)

- Born: Asha Catherine Nandy; London
- Origin: Lewisham
- Genres: UK garage-adjacent
- Occupation: Musician
- Years active: 2020–present
- Member of: ESEA Music

Asha Catherine Nandy (born December 2002), known by the stage name Yunè Pinku, is an Irish musician whose work blends garage with other forms of electronic music. She has released two EPs, Bluff and Babylon IX, the latter of which charted at No. 8 on the UK Dance Albums Chart; she is also a member of ESEA Music, and has been cited as an inspiration by Piri.

== Life and career ==
=== Early life ===
Asha Catherine Nandy was born in December 2002, and grew up in South London; her mother was an Irish Catholic and her father was a Malaysian Hindu. Her family was musical, and her uncles and grandparents spent time trying to teach her Irish instruments such as the tin whistle. She was predominantly raised by her mother, who was chairman of the St Patrick's Festival in Trafalgar Square, and growing up, she would spend a quarter of each year in Cork in Ireland. As a child, she was raised on a mix of Irish traditional music, trance music and the Black Eyed Peas; after tiring of her mother's trance music, she began listening to artists such as Madonna and Billy Joel, and she held several jobs including as a bartender, a Prada intern, and as a crystal shop assistant, where her clientele included mothers wanting assistance with a problem they had and tough guys hoping not to be noticed. She spent five years in Catholic school; having been interested in creative writing from a young age, she studied it at university, dropping out after a month after deciding she had better uses of her time.

Nandy played the piano as a child, although her first proper musical experiments were conducted as a teenager after her cousin sent her a blank website with production software on it, on which she initially made bedroom pop. Later, she developed an affinity with electronic music during the first lockdown after realising that it could be listened to outside of a club; her first works were derived from samples of post-war radio broadcasts, and her earliest works used her voice only as background, though she later made her voice more prominent after finding her vocals conducive to expressing emotions, and by the end of lockdown, she had produced over 150 songs, which she had shared mostly with her then-boyfriend. Her first published works were uploaded to SoundCloud, using the stage name Yunè Pinku; in a March 2022 NME interview, she asserted that she derived her name from her childhood nickname Yunè, the Japanese word for 'cloudy', and Pinku, from her love of Pingu, a Swiss children's program. Although she had friends in the music industry, many of them did not make the same type of music as her, which meant it took her a while to show them her work.

=== Career ===
In July 2021, prior to Nandy releasing anything, and having been in a few sessions with Joy Orbison after her managers passed round some of her demos, he invited her to contribute a guest mix during his BBC Radio 1 residency, and two months later, she released a collaboration with Logic1000, "What You Like"; NME noted in March 2022 that the song had been streamed over 2,600,000 times. She then released the singles "Laylo", a track about FOMO and navigating young adulthood, followed by "Affection" and then "DC Rot", the last of which later appeared on the FIFA 23 soundtrack, and all three of which appeared on her April 2022 EP Bluff. After Bluff was released, she took a five month break from writing, after finding the number of eyes on her stifling; the next two songs she wrote were written on the same day while suffering from allergic rhinitis.

She then released remixes of Charli XCX's "Used to Know Me" and Biig Piig's "Fun", later touring with the latter, and released her own single "Jaws". In April 2023, she released the EP Babylon IX, from which she had previously released the singles "Fai Fighter", "Night Light", "Sports", and "Heartbeat", and which took its title from the Hanging Gardens of Babylon; the EP charted at No. 8 on the UK Dance Albums Chart. She then featured on Hot Chip's "Fire of Mercy" and released a cover of the Cranberries' "Dreams" on Platoon Records, before signing to Method 808, a London-based dance label, and releasing "Killing Bee", which was later remixed by Taahliah. She then released a remix of Disclosure's "Higher Than Ever Before", which alongside remixes by Atrip, Barry Can't Swim, and Narciss appeared on their album Alchemy (Remixes), an album of remixes of tracks from that year's Alchemy.

== Artistry ==
Nandy's usual practice is to work two months on, one month off, and records her vocals on a second-hand podcast microphone given to her by her sister. She writes her songs instrumental first; in a June 2022 interview with the Line of Best Fit, she stated that her usual process was to "write down a bunch of random things or thoughts or phrases I hear on my notes app" and refer to it whenever she was trying to write lyrics and that she frequently adapted her friends' tall tales on the grounds that they were juicier. She also used the interview to note that her earliest work was influenced by Clairo and then by Bladee and Drain Gang, and that she was currently taking inspiration from the "boundary-pushing artists" Sassy 009 and Eartheater; she discovered the latter through her 2019 album Trinity after leaving her Spotify account running in the background, and later noted in a January 2023 interview with Mixmag that she had been introduced to electronic music by the likes of Kelly Lee Owens and Ross from Friends, as well by artists she did not initially realise produced electronic music, such as Grimes.

In August 2022, the Guardian described her works as "garage-adjacent", while Pitchfork has described both Bluff and Babylon IX as a combination of techno and garage and the Line of Best Fit described Bluff as "blending garage-inspired beats with pop, industrial and ambient stylings". Nandy is unusual among producers in that she struggles to cope with raving, having attempted it before and after lockdown; in an interview with Mixmag, she noted that she was "not really good at crowded and loud scenarios", and that this was partially due to an inability to speak loudly. The producer and vocalist Piri used a January 2024 Guardian interview to cite Nandy and Nia Archives as being inspirational for her to produce her own music; despite having been in a band with a producer, it took seeing their success to realise she could produce her own music, having not previously realised it was possible for her as a woman. Nandy is a member of ESEA Music, a collective of UK-based East and Southeast Asian music industry professionals and artists including Rina Sawayama, Andrew Hung, Matt Tong, Lucy Tun, and Sarah Bonito.

== Discography ==
=== EPs ===
- Bluff (Platoon, 2022)
- Babylon IX (Platoon, 2023)
- Scarlet Lamb (Method 808, 2024)

=== Singles ===
- "Laylo" (2021)
- "Affection" (2022)
- "DC Rot" (2022)
- "Jaws" (2022)
- "Fai Fighter" (2022)
- "Night Light" (2022)
- "Sports" (2023)
- "Heartbeat" (2023)
- "Dreams (Rework)" (2023)
- "Killing Bee" (2023)
- "Believe" (2024)
- "Half Alive" (2024)

==== As featured artist ====
- "What You Like" (Logic1000 feat. Yunè Pinku, 2021)
- "Takes Me to You" (Boxed In feat. Yunè Pinku, 2022)
- "Fire of Mercy" (Hot Chip feat. Yunè Pinku, 2023)
- "Spark" (Cecile Believe feat. Yunè Pinku, 2024)

=== Remixes ===
- "Used to Know Me" (Charli XCX, 2022)
- "Fun" (Biig Piig, 2022)
- "Make You Scream" (VTSS, 2023)
- "Fire of Mercy" (Hot Chip feat. Yunè Pinku, 2023)
- "Higher Than Ever Before" (Disclosure, 2023)
- "It Is What It Is" (Rachel Chinouriri, 2024)
