= Logic1000 =

Australian musician and DJ

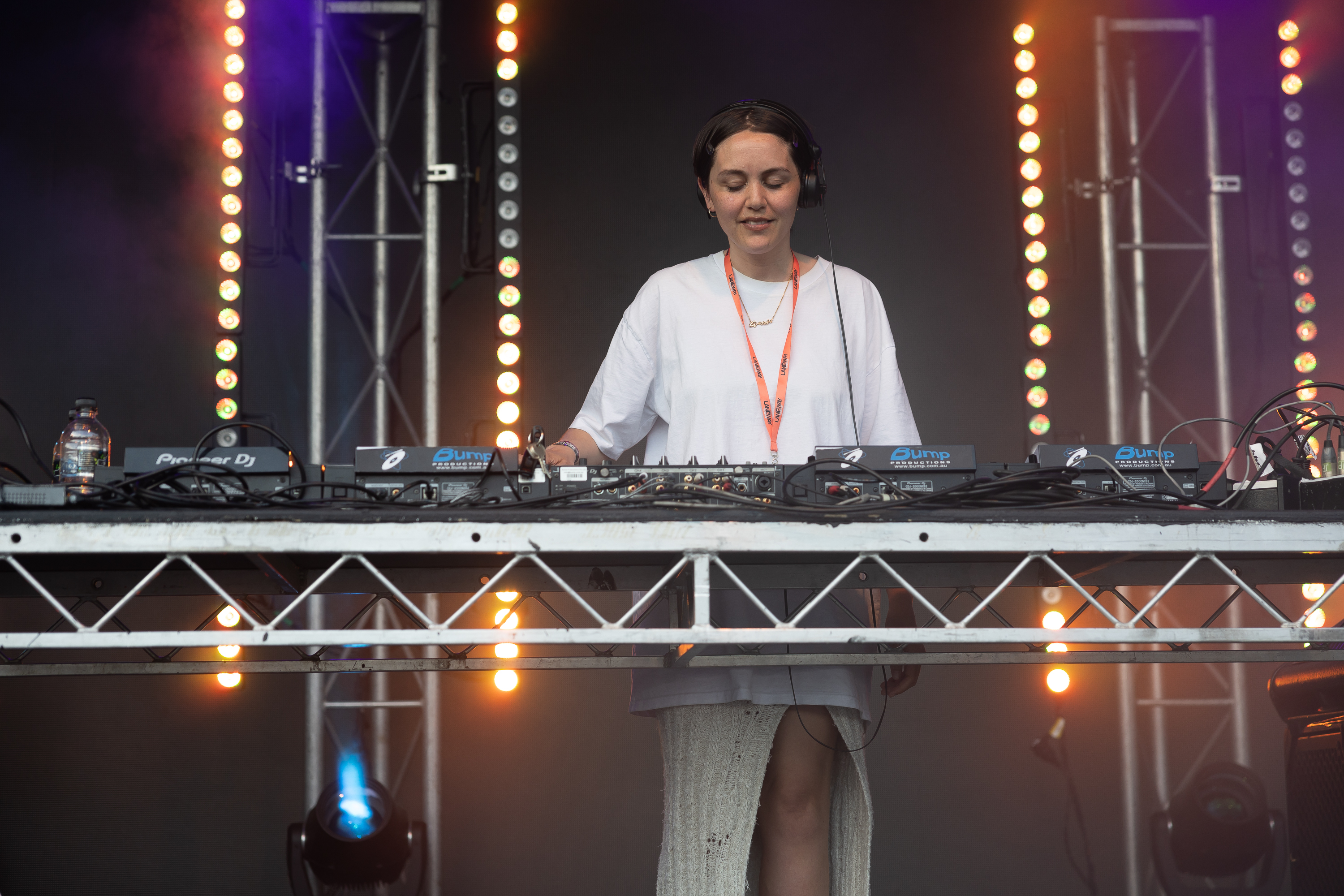
- Logic1000 performing in 2023

Background information
- Born: Samantha Poulter; 10 May 1986 (age 40); Sydney, Australia
- Genres: Electronic; house; techno
- Occupations: Producer; songwriter
- Years active: 2017–present
- Label: Because Music
- Website: logic1000.com

Samantha Poulter (born 10 May 1986), known professionally as Logic1000, is an Australian electronic music producer and DJ living in London. She is signed to Because Music and released her critically acclaimed debut album, Mother, in 2024. Alongside her own releases, she has remixed tracks by artists including Dua Lipa, Don Toliver, Shygirl, and Caribou. In October 2026, Logic1000 published her second album, Confirmation!

== Biography ==
Samantha Poulter was born on 10 May 1986 in the Sydney suburb of Yarrawarrah. She cites artists such as Loefah as early influences. Her first forays into music were in her sister's rock band as a drummer; however, she soon began producing herself. In 2026, she moved back to London having lived in Berlin for 6 years.

She has discussed managing schizophrenia and how its understanding in society is poor, describing an incident in 2011 that nearly led to her serving jail time.

She has a child with her long term partner Tom McAlister, who performs professionally under the name Big Ever. Logic1000 launched a podcast series entitled 'Therapy' with DJ Heléna Star, navigating motherhood, mental health, and the ever changing landscape of the music industry. The podcast's first season has been focused on motherhood in the music industry and has featured the likes of Jayda G, Aluna, Little Dragon, Derrick Gee, Jamz Supernova and Anna Lunoe. She extends this to a Substack also titled Therapy, where she posts weekly blogs.

== Career ==
Logic1000 initially went under the name DJ Logic, before being served a cease-and-desist order from DJ Logic. She relaunched under her updated moniker in 2019.

After getting into electronic music in 2017, she released her first self-titled EP in 2018. Her first break was through Four Tet playing her music in his Coachella set. Remixes for artists such as Caribou, soon followed.

In a cover feature for Mixmag, she revealed her creative process to be collaborative, largely working with her partner Thomas McAlister. She has described herself as "not a technical person". Instead she enjoys working with analogue synths and recording ideas raw. Her music is characterised by euphoric melody.

In December 2020, she was Spotify's Equal artist of the month.

In 2021 she released her EP You've Got the Whole Night to Go, and was featured on Essential Mix with BBC Radio 1. In November 2021, Logic1000 returned with her EP In The Sweetness of You, including single What You Like, featuring vocals from London-based artist Yunè Pinku.

Logic1000 released her debut album Mother in March 2024 featuring singles from Rochelle Jordan, MJ Nebreda, DJ Plead and Kayla Blackmon, which Resident Advisor praised for its "soaring pop aspirations meet slinky club rollers". The album was followed up by mother :;~ rebirth which featured album track reworks from Empress Of, Vagabon and Vv Pete.

In March 2025, Logic1000 released her edition of the infamous DJ-Kicks mix series. The album, which included two original tracks 'fused' and 'under the sun, beneath the rainfall', as well as mixed versions of tracks from the likes of oklou, Saya Grey, Smerz and Blood Orange, represented a softer and more down-tempo side of Logic1000, and received wide critical acclaim. In July 2026 Logic1000 announced her sophomore album Confirmation! with 'All In For You' featuring Kučka, and album is set to feature the likes of Christine and the Queens, Jam City and Yunè Pinku.

== Discography ==
=== Albums ===
List of albums, with selected details
Title	Details
Mother	Released: 22 March 2024; Label: Because Music
Confirmation!	Released: 2 October 2026; Label: Therapy / Because Music

=== Remix albums ===
List of remix albums, with selected details
Title	Details
Mixmag Presents Logic1000	Released: July 2022; Label: Mixmag
DJ-Kicks	Released: 28 March 2025; Label: !K7 Music

=== Extended plays ===
List of EPs, with selected details
Title	Details
Logic1000	Released: December 2019; Label: Logic1000
You've Got the Whole Night to Go	Released: January 2021; Label: Therapy / Because Music
In the Sweetness of You	Released: November 2021; Label: Therapy / Because Music
