= Power (Boys Noize album) =

Studio album by Boys Noize
- Released: 1 October 2009
- Genre: Electronic
- Length: 59:55
- Label: Boysnoize Records
- Producer: Boys Noize

Boys Noize chronology
Oi Oi Oi Remixed (2008)	Power (2009)	Out of the Black (2012)

Professional ratings
Review scores
Source	Rating
Chart Attack	2/5
Clash	8/10
Now	3/5 stars
State	4/5 stars

Power is the second studio album by German electronic music artist Boys Noize, released on 1 October 2009 by Boysnoize Records.

== Track listing ==
No.	Title	Length
1.	"Gax"	4:37
2.	"Kontact Me"	4:23
3.	"Starter"	3:43
4.	"Jeffer"	3:47
5.	"Transmission"	6:12
6.	"Nerve"	5:07
7.	"Trooper"	5:43
8.	"Drummer"	5:19
9.	"Sweet Light"	5:16
10.	"Rozz Box"	6:00
11.	"Nott"	5:16
12.	"Heart Attack"	4:32

iTunes edition bonus track
No.	Title	Length
13.	"AB!"	3:01

== Charts ==
Chart	Peak position
US Top Dance/Electronic Albums (Billboard)	23

== Release history ==
Region	Date
Japan	October 1, 2009
Europe	October 2, 2009
United Kingdom, Belgium	October 5, 2009
United States, Canada, France	October 7, 2009
Australia	October 17, 2009
