= Oi Oi Oi (Remixed) =

Remix album by Boys Noize
- Released: 25 March 2008
- Genres: Electronic; techno; electro house
- Length: 39:59
- Labels: Last Gang Records; Boysnoize Records
- Producer: Alexander Ridha

Boys Noize chronology
Oi Oi Oi (2007)	Oi Oi Oi (Remixed) (2008)	Power (2009)

Oi Oi Oi Remixed is a remix album from German electro-tech producer and DJ Boys Noize. It was released on 25 March 2008 on Boysnoize Records. It features remixes from producers like Surkin, A-Trak, and Feadz.

== Track listing ==
1. & Down (Siriusmo vs. Boys Noize Mix) (3:40)
2. Lava Lava (Feadz Aval Aval Mix) (4:15)
3. The Battery (DJ Maxximus 8-Ball Refix) (3:53)
4. Oh! (A-Trak Remix) (4:27)
5. Let's Buy Happiness (Proxy Remix) (3:52)
6. My Head (Para One Remix) (6:12)
7. Shine Shine (Apparat Remix) (6:52)
8. Don't Believe the Hype (Surkin Mix no. 2) (4:15)
9. Frau (featuring I-Robots) (PUZIQUe Remix) (8:42)

Digital Release Bonus Tracks:

1. Don't Believe the Hype (Proxy Remix) (4:58)
2. Don't Believe the Hype (Housemeister Remix) (5:59)
