= Octave Minds =

Studio album by Octave Minds
- Released: 15 September 2014
- Genres: Electronic; downtempo
- Length: 38:52
- Label: Boysnoize Records
- Producers: Boys Noize; Chilly Gonzales

Boys Noize chronology
Out of the Black (2012)	Octave Minds (2014)	Mayday (2016)

Chilly Gonzales chronology
Solo Piano II (2012)	Octave Minds (2014)	Chambers (2015)

Professional ratings
Review scores
Source	Rating
AllMusic	4/5 stars
Financial Times	4/5 stars
NME	3.5/5 stars

Octave Minds is a studio album by electronic music superduo Octave Minds, which consists of German electronic music artist Boys Noize and Canadian musician and composer Chilly Gonzales. It was released on 15 September 2014 by Boysnoize Records.

== Track listing ==
Octave Minds track listing
No.	Title	Length
1.	"Symmetry Slice"	3:44
2.	"Anthem"	5:30
3.	"Initials KK"	4:06
4.	"Tap Dance" (featuring Chance the Rapper and The Social Experiment)	3:49
5.	"Royalty"	2:43
6.	"Om"	1:31
7.	"Together"	4:18
8.	"Projectionist"	2:34
9.	"Done Deal"	5:03
10.	"In Silence"	3:58
11.	"Symmetry Slice, Pt. 2"	1:36
Total length:		38:52
