= Full Phil =

- Directed by: Quentin Dupieux
- Written by: Quentin Dupieux
- Produced by: Hugo Sélignac
- Starring: Woody Harrelson; Kristen Stewart; Emma Mackey; Charlotte Le Bon; Tim Heidecker; Eric Wareheim
- Cinematography: Quentin Dupieux
- Edited by: Quentin Dupieux
- Music by: Siriusmo
- Production companies: Chi-Fou-Mi Productions; Artémis Productions; Samsa Film
- Distributed by: Diaphana Distribution
- Release date: May 17, 2026 (Cannes)
- Running time: 78 minutes
- Country: France
- Language: English

Full Phil is a 2026 French absurdist comedy drama film written, edited and directed by Quentin Dupieux. It stars Woody Harrelson, Kristen Stewart, Emma Mackey, Charlotte Le Bon, Tim Heidecker, and Eric Wareheim.

The film had its world premiere at the Midnight Screenings section of the 2026 Cannes Film Festival on May 17, 2026.

== Premise ==
A rich American industrialist's Paris trip with his estranged daughter Madeleine goes awry when French food, a vintage horror movie, and a meddling hotel worker interfere with their plans.

== Cast ==
- Woody Harrelson as Philip Doom
- Kristen Stewart as Madeleine
- Emma Mackey as the girl from the marais (swamp)
- Charlotte Le Bon as Lucie
- Tim Heidecker as Chad
- Eric Wareheim as Andy
- Nassim Lyes as Hotel Manager

== Production ==
In October 2025, principal photography began in Paris on a comedy drama film, written and directed by Quentin Dupieux, and starring Woody Harrelson and Kristen Stewart. Later that month, Emma Mackey, Charlotte Le Bon, Tim Heidecker, Eric Wareheim, and Nassim Lyes rounded out the cast. Filming wrapped on February 2, 2026.

It marks Dupieux's first English-language film in nearly 13 years, following Wrong Cops (2013). The film was backed by Vixens, a Paris-based production banner.

== Reception ==
On review aggregator website Rotten Tomatoes, the film holds an approval rating of 68% based on 22 reviews, with an average rating of 5.4/10. On Metacritic, which uses a weighted average, the film holds a score of 60/100 based on 10 critics, indicating "mixed or average" reviews.

Phil de Semlyen of Time Out described Full Phil as a Buñuelian chamber piece and a “gonzo parenthood parable” exploring the emotional tension between an aging father and his adult daughter, combining absurd comedy with elements of body horror. Pavel Snapkou of Showbiz by PS described the film as "completely insane and wild, but also genuinely funny and charming", noting its strong entertainment value and emotional undertones, even if its thematic ideas are not fully developed. Elena Lazic of The Playlist argued that the film’s allegorical approach often feels blunt and didactic, criticizing its thematic execution and tonal shifts, while still acknowledging Quentin Dupieux’s continued interest in exploring parent–child relationships through surreal storytelling.
