= The Unspeakable Chilly Gonzales =

Studio album by Chilly Gonzales
- Released: 20 June 2011
- Length: 40:01
- Label: Gentle Threat

Chilly Gonzales chronology
Ivory Tower (2010)	The Unspeakable Chilly Gonzales (2011)	Solo Piano II (2012)

Professional ratings
Review scores
Source	Rating
Clash Magazine	7/10
Drowned in Sound	7/10
God Is in the TV	5/5 stars
The Guardian	4/5 stars
MusicOMH	4.5/5 stars
The Skinny	4/5 stars

The Unspeakable Chilly Gonzales is a studio album by Canadian musician and producer Chilly Gonzales. It was released on 20 June 2011, by Gentle Threat Records. The album cover was designed by Gary McGarvey, also known as Horse. It was originally a promo poster for Chilly's show in Liverpool on 9 February 2011, and Chilly liked it so much that he used it for the cover.

== Critical reception ==
In a review for God Is in the TV, the album received five stars out of five, noting that it has "slick song writing at its very best." Alan Souter of The Skinny wrote: "Musically, it's typically theatrical and showy but always concise, woven together by the brazen monologues Gonzales revels in. It’s a logical and characteristically dramatic progression for the lauded nonconformist." At Drowned in Sound, Adam Boult said: "Never one to stick rigidly to convention, on The Unspeakable... the Canadian has aimed to create something pretty rare. Over a nine-song, sub-30 minute runtime there are no beats and not much bass to speak of."

Writing for Clash Magazine, critic reviewer Emily Anderton said: "Booming kettledrums, delicate pianos and dramatic violins support rhymes chocca with wit, sincerity, pop culture and self-depreciation. An impressive album, but the main impact is almost certainly in the live incendiary, incisive and ego drenched show."

== Track listing ==
The Unspeakable Chilly Gonzales track listing
No.	Title	Length
1.	"Supervillain Music"	3:15
2.	"Self Portrait"	3:37
3.	"Party in My Mind"	3:21
4.	"Different Kind of Prostitute"	2:34
5.	"Rap Race"	1:58
6.	"Beans"	3:29
7.	"Bongo Monologue"	3:04
8.	"Who Wants to Hear This?"	2:41
9.	"Shut Up and Play the Piano"	3:36
10.	"Different Kind of Prostitute" (Instrumental version)	2:35
11.	"Self Portrait" (Instrumental version)	3:38
12.	"Beans" (Instrumental version)	3:30
13.	"Who Wants to Hear This" (Instrumental version)	2:42

iTunes bonus track
No.	Title	Length
14.	"Supervillain Music" (Instrumental version)	3:17
