= Harmony (Brutalismus 3000 album) =

Studio album by Brutalismus 3000
- Released: 26 June 2026
- Studio: Brutalismus 3000's home studio; Boys Noize's home studio (Portugal); Pigshed (Essex)
- Genre: Techno; gabber; hardstyle; hyperpop
- Length: 36:25
- Label: Live from Earth; Columbia
- Producer: Erol Alkan; Boys Noize; Dylan Brady; Notinbed; Underworld; Theo Zeitner

Brutalismus 3000 chronology
Ultrakunst (2023)	Harmony (2026)

Singles from Harmony
- 1. "I Bring My Gun to the Function" Released: 29 April 2026; 2. "Gore Louvre" Released: 5 June 2026

Harmony is the second studio album by the German electronic music duo Brutalismus 3000. It was released on 26 June 2026 through LivefFrom Earth and Columbia Records. The album was co-produced by the duo with Boys Noize and Dylan Brady of 100 Gecs, and includes guest appearances by Boys Noize, Anya Taylor-Joy, and Underworld.

The album follows Brutalismus 3000's 2023 debut album Ultrakunst and expands the duo's hard dance sound with elements of hyperpop, trap, dubstep, nu metal, and punk. Harmony received positive reviews from critics, who described it as more collaborative, melodic, and pop-oriented than the duo's earlier work while retaining their abrasive gabber and hardstyle foundation.

== Background and recording ==
Brutalismus 3000 consists of vocalist Victoria Vassiliki Daldas and producer Theo Zeitner. In a 2026 profile for Mixmag, Ben Jolley wrote that Daldas and Zeitner met in 2018 and began making music after bonding over punk, German electropunk, and the Berlin club scene. Their early tracks, including "Satan Was a Babyboomer" and "Romantika", circulated online during the COVID-19 lockdowns; the duo released their debut album, Ultrakunst, in 2023 and made their Coachella debut the following year.

Jolley wrote that the duo's experiences with international audiences, and their dissatisfaction with parts of Berlin's contemporary hard-techno scene, pushed them toward a wider sound on Harmony. Daldas said that they wanted to do something new, while Zeitner described having to teach himself styles outside his previous hard-techno and gabber comfort zone, including the use of 808s for trap beats. The album began from its title and from song names taken from poems the duo had written together.

Dazed writer Thom Waite described Harmony as showing a changed recording process for the duo, with Brady and Boys Noize contributing to production and Underworld and Anya Taylor-Joy appearing as vocal guests. Stereogum's Margaret Farrell wrote that the album was produced over a period that included work in Los Angeles, New York, Portugal, and elsewhere, before the duo finished it at home during its final months. Much of the album was produced in North America and that its imagery drew partly on American settings and political unease.

== Music and themes ==
Harmony is a techno, gabber, hardstyle, and hyperpop album that also incorporates dubstep, trap, punk, nu metal, and electroclash. Pitchfork's Lydia Wei described it as Brutalismus 3000's most genre-agnostic album and as their most pop-oriented work, noting the presence of gabber, hardstyle, hyperpop, dubstep, electroclash, nu metal, punk, and trap. Resident Advisor similarly described the album as a genre-traversing LP incorporating dubstep, trap, punk, nu metal, and techno. Jolley wrote in Mixmag that the duo stretched beyond their gabber-techno-punk hybrid and produced some of their most melodic material.

Paul Attard of Slant Magazine described the album as a disciplined hard-dance record built from gabber, trap drums, reverse bass, metal guitar elements, and Daldas's vocals, while also finding a persistent melancholy beneath the aggressive production. Wei wrote that the album's tracks were dense and hyperactive but not chaotic for their own sake, and highlighted "Friends at the Pigshed" as a comparatively straightforward techno track with Underworld. Farrell described Harmony as a collaborative record built from hardcore, gabber, industrial pressure, and cinematic detail, with "You Were Never Really Here but I Miss Ya" and "Friends at the Pigshed" bringing softer and more nostalgic moments into the album.

The album uses more English-language material than Ultrakunst, which mixed German and Slovak lyrics. Wei related the English lyrics and imagery to American junkyard and B movie settings, and discussed Taylor-Joy's spoken-word appearance on "Morning Is for the Happy". In Dazed, Waite wrote that the duo framed the title Harmony as an ironic starting point for a record about resisting "toxic positivity", but that the album became lighter during its development as the collaborations took shape. Stereogum's interview also described poetry by Leonard Cohen and Nick Cave as influences on the duo's writing process, particularly in how they assembled lyrics from collected lines and fragments.

== Release and promotion ==
Resident Advisor announced Harmony on 29 April 2026, reporting that Brutalismus 3000 would release the album on 26 June, and that it would feature Boys Noize, Taylor-Joy, and Underworld. The same day, "I Bring My Gun to the Function", featuring Boys Noize was released as the first single. On 5 June 2026, the duo shared "Gore Louvre" as the second single..

Before release, the duo held listening events in several countries, including Japan, China, and the United States. Dazed reported that the album was accompanied by a planned video trilogy, beginning with the video for "I Bring My Gun to the Function" and continuing with videos for "Gore Louvre" and "Testo Skin Part 1".

== Critical reception ==
Professional ratings
Review scores
Source	Rating
Pitchfork	7.6/10
Slant Magazine	4/5 stars

Wei wrote in Pitchfork that Harmony pushed Brutalismus 3000's hardstyle techno toward pop hooks and exploitation film imagery, describing its overstimulation as deliberate and its humour as central to its appeal. She noted the album's broader use of genre and English-language imagery, while also writing that its more extreme lyrics could be difficult to take seriously.

Attard wrote in Slant Magazine that the album combined aggressive dance production with more emotive writing, calling it more disciplined than its premise might suggest and identifying "Morning Is for the Happy" as its least persuasive guest feature. He considered "Friends at the Pigshed" more successful, pairing the duo with Underworld in a way that connected outsider dance music with emotional directness. In Mixmag, Jolley framed the album as an expansion that produced some of the duo's most melodic and catchy work. Farrell wrote for Stereogum that Harmony was more coherent as an album than Ultrakunst, with its abrasive production balanced by collaborative structure and moments of emotional clarity.

== Track listing ==
All lyrics are written by Victoria Daldas and Theo Zeitner; "I Bring My Gun to the Function" lyrics written with Lukas Oscar.

Harmony track listing
No.	Title	Music	Producer(s)	Length
1.	"No Friends in the Company"	Theo Zeitner; Dylan Brady; Notinbed	Zeitner; Notinbed; Brady^{[c]}^{[v]}; Boys Noize^{[a]}^{[v]}	2:25
2.	"Garland"	Zeitner; Notinbed	Zeitner; Boys Noize^{[c]}^{[v]}; Notinbed^{[c]}; Joel Schwander^{[a]}	2:58
3.	"A Milli"	Zeitner	Zeitner; Boys Noize^{[v]}	2:27
4.	"Mother Bug"	Zeitner; Erol Alkan; Boys Noize	Zeitner; Alkan; Boys Noize	2:42
5.	"I Bring My Gun to the Function" (with Boys Noize)	Zeitner; Boys Noize	Zeitner; Boys Noize; Sparr00w^{[a]}	3:10
6.	"Kairo"	Zeitner; Notinbed	Zeitner; Notinbed; Boys Noize^{[a]}^{[v]}; Brady^{[a]}^{[v]}	3:35
7.	"Morning Is for the Happy" (with Anya Taylor-Joy)	Zeitner	Zeitner	1:17
8.	"You Were Never Really Here but I Miss Ya"	Zeitner; Boys Noize	Zeitner; Boys Noize^{[p]}	2:24
9.	"Friends at the Pigshed" (with Underworld)	Zeitner; Boys Noize; Karl Hyde; Notinbed; Rick Smith	Zeitner; Underworld; Boys Noize^{[c]}; Brady^{[c]}; Notinbed^{[c]}	3:57
10.	"Gore Louvre"	Zeitner	Zeitner	3:00
11.	"Leonard Cohen"	Zeitner; Brady; Notinbed	Zeitner; Brady; Notinbed^{[c]}; Boys Noize^{[a]}	3:06
12.	"Testo Skin Part 1"	Zeitner; Brady; Mikkel Cox	Zeitner; Cox^{[c]}; Boys Noize^{[a]}; Brady^{[a]}^{[v]}	2:49
13.	"Testo Skin Part 2"	Zeitner; Cox	Zeitner; Brady^{[p]}; Cox^{[c]}	2:35
Total length:				36:25

=== Notes ===
- ^{^[p]} signifes a producer and vocal producer
- ^{^[c]} signifies a co-producer
- ^{^[a]} signifies an additional producer
- ^{^[v]} signifies a vocal producer

== Personnel ==
Credits are adapted from Dazed, Slant, and Tidal.

=== Brutalismus 3000 ===
- Victoria Vassiliki Daldas – vocals, cover art
- Theo Zeitner – drums, bass, guitar, synthesizers, cover art

=== Additional contributors ===
- Tove Burman – arrangement on "Kairo" and "Friends at the Pigshed"
- Rami Dawod – arrangement on "Kairo"
- Anya Taylor-Joy – narration on "Morning Is for the Happy"
- Underworld – vocals on "Friends at the Pigshed"
- Michal Cajzer – arrangement on "Gore Louvre"
