= Mayday (Boys Noize album) =

Studio album by Boys Noize
- Released: 20 May 2016
- Genre: Electronic
- Length: 47:46
- Label: Boysnoize Records
- Producer: Boys Noize

Boys Noize chronology
Octave Minds (2014)	Mayday (2016)	+/- (2021)

Professional ratings
Aggregate scores
Source	Rating
Metacritic	65/100
Review scores
Source	Rating
The Guardian	3/5 stars
Mixmag	9/10
PopMatters	6/10 stars

Mayday is the fourth studio album by German electronic music artist Boys Noize, released on 20 May 2016 by Boysnoize Records. It features guest appearances from Benga, Remy Banks, Poliça, Hudson Mohawke, and Spank Rock.

In advance of his tour starting in August 2016, Boys Noize released another version of "Birthday" with Hudson Mohawke, Spank Rock, Danny Brown, and Pell. "Rock the Bells" was previously teased in 2014, as "RunX" with Baauer, though Baauer has remained uncredited.

== Track listing ==
No.	Title	Length
1.	"Overthrow"	4:43
2.	"Mayday"	3:18
3.	"Dynamite" (featuring Benga)	3:14
4.	"Rock the Bells"	2:50
5.	"Euphoria" (featuring Remy Banks)	4:34
6.	"2 Live"	3:25
7.	"Would You Listen"	3:14
8.	"Revolt"	3:03
9.	"Starchild" (featuring Poliça)	4:32
10.	"Midnight"	4:33
11.	"Los Niños"	4:01
12.	"Hardkotzen"	3:05
13.	"Birthday" (featuring Hudson Mohawke and Spank Rock)	3:14

== Charts ==
Chart	Peak position
US Top Dance/Electronic Albums (Billboard)	8
