= Solo Piano II =

Studio album by Chilly Gonzales
- Released: 27 August 2012
- Recorded: December 2011
- Studio: Studio Pigalle in Paris
- Length: 39:15
- Label: Gentle Threat

Chilly Gonzales chronology
The Unspeakable Chilly Gonzales (2011)	Solo Piano II (2012)	Octave Minds (2014)

Solo Piano II is an album by Chilly Gonzales which was released on 27 August 2012. The album features 14 original compositions for piano written and performed by Chilly Gonzales.

The album was named a longlisted nominee for the 2013 Polaris Music Prize on 13 June 2013.

== Background ==
The ideas for the pieces were formed through improvisation and extensive note-taking of melodies and other musical ideas over years. His previous experience with jazz is noticeable, and some critics still compared him to Erik Satie. Four tracks, "White Keys", "Kenaston", "Othello" and "Train of Thought", were also recorded for "Pianovision" videos on YouTube and Vimeo, which give the viewer a top-down perspective of Chilly Gonzales' performance on the piano. Chilly Gonzales regularly allows his audience to closely watch him playing, as was the case for his first Solo Piano album tour, where a video camera directly above him projected his playing to a large screen that the audience can see.

== Track listing ==
No.	Title	Length
1.	"White Keys"	3:07
2.	"Kenaston"	3:05
3.	"Minor Fantasy"	3:26
4.	"Escher"	2:40
5.	"Rideaux Lunaires"	2:39
6.	"Nero's Nocturne"	2:15
7.	"Venetian Blinds"	2:45
8.	"Evolving Doors"	2:27
9.	"Epigram in E"	2:48
10.	"Othello"	3:15
11.	"Train of Thought"	2:26
12.	"Wintermezzo"	2:55
13.	"La Bulle"	2:51
14.	"Papa Gavotte"	2:46
Total length:		39:15

== Charts ==
Chart (2012)	Peak position
Belgian Albums Chart (Flanders)	36
Belgian Albums Chart (Wallonia)	74
French Albums Chart	25
Dutch Albums Chart	50
German Albums Chart	59
Swiss Albums Chart	53
UK Independent Albums (Official Charts)	45
UK Jazz & Blues Albums (Official Charts)	3
US New Age Albums (Billboard)	1
