= Lützenkirchen =

German DJ

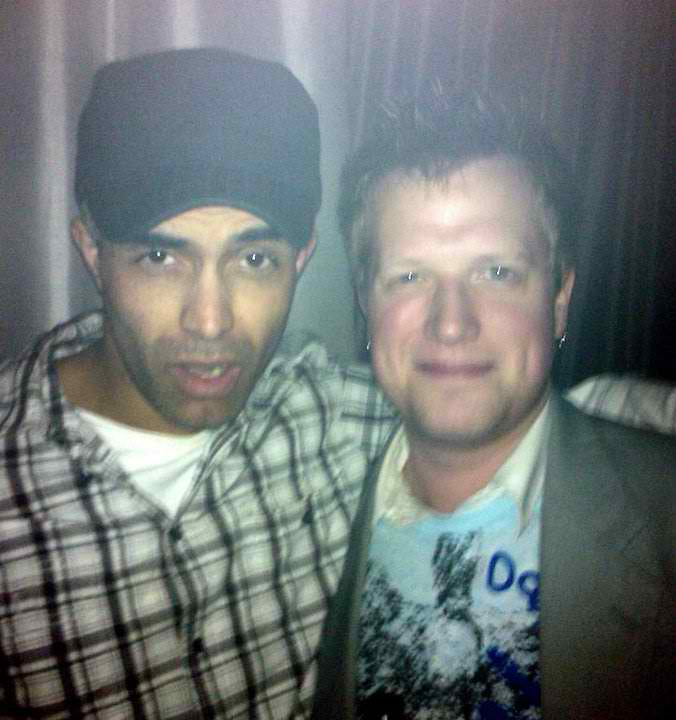
- Lützenkirchen (left) and EDM Producer Benjamin Blade (aka Fox Paws) at Club Bleu in Detroit, Michigan in 2011

Background information
- Born: Tobias David Lützenkirchen; 1976 or 1977
- Genre: Electronica
- Occupations: Musician, DJ
- Years active: 1992 – present
- Label: Great Stuff / Platform B
- Website: https://www.lutzenkirchen.com/

Lützenkirchen (born 1976 or 1977, real name Tobias David Lützenkirchen) is a German DJ and producer. He is best known for having created the 2008 song "3 Tage Wach" which reached the German Top 40 Charts.

Lützenkirchen began his DJ career in 2006, adopting Lützenkirchen as his professional name. By 2008 he had switched to performing pure live sets.

The single "3 Tage Wach" ("awake for three days") was the 60th best-selling single of 2008 in Germany. As summarized by Spiegel Online, the vocoder lyrics describe "how it feels to party for three days without sleep, ingesting lots of alcohol and drugs". Lützenkirchen has described them as satire and as a humorous "mirror of the [Techno] scene", and rejected claims that it was advocating drug use. He has been stipulating in contracts that flyers and posters must not mention "3 Tage wach", being concerned that the hit would define his image too much.
