= Brutalismus 3000 =

German electronic music duo

- Origin: Berlin, Germany
- Genres: Techno; hard house; gabber; punk
- Years active: 2020–present
- Labels: Live from Earth; Columbia
- Members: Victoria Vassiliki Daldas; Theo Zeitner

Brutalismus 3000 (sometimes stylized as B3000 or B3K) are an electronic music duo from Berlin, comprising Victoria Vassiliki Daldas and Theo Zeitner.

== History ==
Theo Zeitner began producing music around 2012, while Victoria Vassiliki Daldas played the piano and sang in her school choir. Daldas and Zeitner met in 2018 on the dating app Tinder and began recording music together in 2020. The duo released their debut EP Amore Hardcore on April 24, 2020. The duo released their second EP, Liebe in Zeiten der Kola, on November 20, 2020.

On October 16, 2021, the duo performed at the BR Festival London festival, a video which amassed over 5.9 million views on the Boiler Room YouTube channel, as of January 2024. The third EP by the duo, Eros Massacre, was released on April 29, 2022.

On April 7, 2023, Brutalismus 3000 released their debut album, Ultrakunst. The album reached number 11 on the Offizielle Deutsche Charts three weeks after its release. The duo's first music video for the single Die Liebe kommt nicht aus Berlin was released at the beginning of March.

On June 26, 2026, Brutalismus 3000 released their second album Harmony, preceded by the lead single, I Bring My Gun To The Function (with Boys Noize) on April 29, 2026, and Gore Louvre on June 4, 2026.

== Influences and style ==
Brutalismus 3000 are known for their rough sound. The duo states that their stylistic influences come from genres such as gabber, hardcore, hardstyle, and punk. Commentators have opined that their music also incorporates influences such as electroclash and hyperpop. The duo has cited groups like Deutsch Amerikanische Freundschaft, and Blümchen as influences.

Much of the duo's music also incorporates political themes, such as the tracks "No Sex With Cops" and "Satan Was a Babyboomer". Daldas has described her vocals in the song "Good Girl" as feminist. Brutalismus 3000 incorporates lyrics in English, German, and Slovak in their music (Daldas speaks all three). The duo also says they incorporate irony in their music, and take influence from 2000s music. The duo's music often has aggressive vocals from Daldas.

The duo has also received attention for their remix of the single Eisbär, from Swiss Neue Deutsche Welle band Grauzone.

== Discography ==
=== Albums ===
- 2023: Ultrakunst
- 2026: Harmony

=== Compilations ===
- 2021: Satan Was a Babyboomer
- 2022: Nightclubbing (Brutalismus 3000 Version)

=== EPs ===
- 2020: Amore Hardcore
- 2020: Liebe in Zeiten der Kola
- 2022: Eros Massacre
- 2024: Goodbye Salò

=== Singles ===
- 2020: "Horíme"
- 2020: "Das Model"
- 2021: "Phenomena"
- 2021: "Atmosféra"
- 2022: "3ISBÄR"
- 2023: "Die Liebe kommt nicht aus Berlin"
- 2024: "Europaträume"
- 2024: "9mm"
- 2026: "Spiral" (with ISOxo)
- 2026: "I Bring My Gun To The Function (with Boys Noize)"
- 2026: "Gore Louvre"

=== Remixes ===
- 2022: Lucinee – "Bang Juice" (Brutalismus 3000 Remix)
- 2022: Yung Hurn – "Alleine" (Brutalismus 3000 RMX)
