= Martyna Maja =

Polish DJ

Martyna Maja, known professionally as VTSS, is a Polish DJ, born in 1994 in Warsaw.
