= Abra (singer) =

American singer (born 1989)

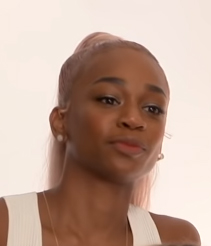
- Abra in 2018

Background information
- Born: Gabrielle Olivia Mirville; March 30, 1989 (age 36); New York City, U.S.
- Origin: Atlanta, Georgia, U.S.
- Genres: Synth-pop; alternative R&B; indie pop; hip hop; trap
- Occupations: Singer; songwriter
- Years active: 2015–present
- Labels: Polo Grounds; RCA (current); Awful (former)

Gabrielle Olivia Mirville (born March 30, 1989), known professionally as Abra (stylized as ABRA), is an American singer and songwriter. She is currently signed to Polo Grounds Music and RCA Records, and was formerly signed to Awful Records.

== Early life and education ==
Abra was born in Queens, New York to missionary parents from Guyana and Haiti. Abra spent her first eight years in London, where her parents built the church they would ultimately work in. Her introduction to singing came from that church, too, where her father was pastor and her mother oversaw praise and worship. After London, her family settled in the suburb of Lilburn outside Atlanta.

At 14, Abra began playing guitar. She attended Parkview High School and was an active member of the drama department, graduating in 2007.

== Career ==
Later in her teens, she began uploading her acoustic covers of rap songs onto YouTube. This led to her being discovered by Awful Records founder and rapper Father, who encouraged her to make original music. She joined the label in 2014, later expressing that her early experiences with Awful Records were a source of inspiration for her, describing the experience as "the battery in my back."

Her first EP, BLQ Velvet, was released in 2015. Her second EP, Princess was released by True Panther Sounds on July 15, 2016. It is her first release on a major label. The song "Fruit" off the album Rose was featured in an article on the best R&B songs of 2016 by The Guardian.

Regarding Abra's style of clothing, Vogue commented in 2016 that "deliberate contrasts are part of her artistic identity on the whole: Abra is a member of the mostly male-dominated Awful Records coterie, an outlier crew swiftly taking over Atlanta with a sound that stands apart from ATL's rap oeuvre".

Abra is one of the stars of the 2018 film Assassination Nation and plays Em. She later described the experience as incredibly labor-intensive, requiring significant amounts of work to produce even the smallest scenes. She compared the work to grape treading, "stomping on all these grapes to make a little [bottle] of wine."

In 2023, she released her single "FKA MESS", which was described as a "six-minute experimental pop excursion" by The Fader.

== Musical style ==
Dazed characterized Abra's early work as featuring "often-looming, bass-heavy production, laced with hypnotically melodic and vulnerable lyricism", noting that her work has featured elements of trap music, electronic music, and rhythm and blues.

== Discography ==
=== Remixes ===
Year	Title	Track listing	Details
2013	Kookaburra	1. "Kookaburra (feat. ABRA) - Dark Cerberus Sound"	Release: July 13, 2013 (digital, SoundCloud, YouTube); Format: Digital, SoundCloud, YouTube; Remix by: Dark Cerberus Sound; Total Length: 5:04

=== Studio albums ===
Year	Title	Track listing	Details
2015	Rose	1. "Feel"	Release: June 16, 2015 (digital download & streaming) – October 6, 2017 (vinyl); Format: Digital download, streaming, vinyl; Label: Awful, Ninja Tune; Total Length: 54:34
2015	Rose	2. "Roses"	Release: June 16, 2015 (digital download & streaming) – October 6, 2017 (vinyl); Format: Digital download, streaming, vinyl; Label: Awful, Ninja Tune; Total Length: 54:34
2015	Rose	3. "U Kno"	Release: June 16, 2015 (digital download & streaming) – October 6, 2017 (vinyl); Format: Digital download, streaming, vinyl; Label: Awful, Ninja Tune; Total Length: 54:34
2015	Rose	4. "Fruit"	Release: June 16, 2015 (digital download & streaming) – October 6, 2017 (vinyl); Format: Digital download, streaming, vinyl; Label: Awful, Ninja Tune; Total Length: 54:34
2015	Rose	5. "Pride"	Release: June 16, 2015 (digital download & streaming) – October 6, 2017 (vinyl); Format: Digital download, streaming, vinyl; Label: Awful, Ninja Tune; Total Length: 54:34
2015	Rose	6. "Lights Intelude (feat. Archibald SLIM)"	Release: June 16, 2015 (digital download & streaming) – October 6, 2017 (vinyl); Format: Digital download, streaming, vinyl; Label: Awful, Ninja Tune; Total Length: 54:34
2015	Rose	7. "Atoms"	Release: June 16, 2015 (digital download & streaming) – October 6, 2017 (vinyl); Format: Digital download, streaming, vinyl; Label: Awful, Ninja Tune; Total Length: 54:34
2015	Rose	8. "No Chill"	Release: June 16, 2015 (digital download & streaming) – October 6, 2017 (vinyl); Format: Digital download, streaming, vinyl; Label: Awful, Ninja Tune; Total Length: 54:34
2015	Rose	9. "$hot (feat. Stalin Majesty)"	Release: June 16, 2015 (digital download & streaming) – October 6, 2017 (vinyl); Format: Digital download, streaming, vinyl; Label: Awful, Ninja Tune; Total Length: 54:34
2015	Rose	10. "Tonight!"	Release: June 16, 2015 (digital download & streaming) – October 6, 2017 (vinyl); Format: Digital download, streaming, vinyl; Label: Awful, Ninja Tune; Total Length: 54:34
2015	Rose	11. "Human"	Release: June 16, 2015 (digital download & streaming) – October 6, 2017 (vinyl); Format: Digital download, streaming, vinyl; Label: Awful, Ninja Tune; Total Length: 54:34
2015	Rose	12. "Game"	Release: June 16, 2015 (digital download & streaming) – October 6, 2017 (vinyl); Format: Digital download, streaming, vinyl; Label: Awful, Ninja Tune; Total Length: 54:34

=== Extended plays ===
Year	Title	Track listing	Details
2015	BLQ Velvet	1. "U Go I Go"	Release: January 19, 2015; Format: Digital download, streaming; Label: Awful, ACID PALACE RECORDINGS; Total Length: 27:33
2015	BLQ Velvet	2. "Make It"	Release: January 19, 2015; Format: Digital download, streaming; Label: Awful, ACID PALACE RECORDINGS; Total Length: 27:33
2015	BLQ Velvet	3. "Unwise"	Release: January 19, 2015; Format: Digital download, streaming; Label: Awful, ACID PALACE RECORDINGS; Total Length: 27:33
2015	BLQ Velvet	4. "I Guess"	Release: January 19, 2015; Format: Digital download, streaming; Label: Awful, ACID PALACE RECORDINGS; Total Length: 27:33
2015	BLQ Velvet	5. "Fade 2 Blaq"	Release: January 19, 2015; Format: Digital download, streaming; Label: Awful, ACID PALACE RECORDINGS; Total Length: 27:33
2015	BLQ Velvet	6. "Love & Power"	Release: January 19, 2015; Format: Digital download, streaming; Label: Awful, ACID PALACE RECORDINGS; Total Length: 27:33

Year	Title	Track listing	Details
2016	PRINCESS	1. "COME 4 ME"	Release: July 15, 2016; Format: Digital download, streaming; Label: True Panther Sounds, Awful; Total Length: 22:12
2016	PRINCESS	2. "VEGAS"	Release: July 15, 2016; Format: Digital download, streaming; Label: True Panther Sounds, Awful; Total Length: 22:12
2016	PRINCESS	3. "CRYBABY"	Release: July 15, 2016; Format: Digital download, streaming; Label: True Panther Sounds, Awful; Total Length: 22:12
2016	PRINCESS	4. "BIG BOI (feat. Tommy Genesis)"	Release: July 15, 2016; Format: Digital download, streaming; Label: True Panther Sounds, Awful; Total Length: 22:12
2016	PRINCESS	5. "PULL UP"	Release: July 15, 2016; Format: Digital download, streaming; Label: True Panther Sounds, Awful; Total Length: 22:12
2016	PRINCESS	6. "THINKING OF YOU"	Release: July 15, 2016; Format: Digital download, streaming; Label: True Panther Sounds, Awful; Total Length: 22:12

=== Singles ===
- ABRA – Diamonds & Gold (2012)
- ABRA – Don't Kill Men (2012)
- ABRA – Oh Come, Oh Come, Emmanuel (2014)
- ABRA – Sin City (2014)
- ABRA – NEEDSUMBODY (2014)
- ABRA – CENTERSTAGE 1.17 (2015)
- ABRA – Then U Get Some (2015)
- ABRA – BFF (2015)
- ABRA feat. Father – U Ain't Got To Lie (2015)
- ABRA – Bounty (2016)
- ABRA – NOVACANE (2017) [for Adult Swim Singles]
- ABRA – BACARDI (2017)
- ABRA – B.R.A.T (2018)
- ABRA & Boys Noize – Unlock It (feat. Playboi Carti) (2021)
- ABRA – FKA MESS (2023)
- ABRA & Groupthink – Gold on Me (2024)
- ABRA & Kingdom – SUBI (2024)

=== Guest appearances ===
- HYDRABADD feat. ABRA – Sanctuary (2013)
- DARKCERBERUSSOUND feat. ABRA – Kookaburra (2013)
- Archibald SLIM feat. ABRA – Luv (2015)
- Micah Freeman feat. ABRA – Movement (2015)
- salute feat. ABRA – Colourblind (2015)
- Ethereal feat. ABRA & Father – STYX (2015)
- KCSB feat. ABRA – All My Luv (2015)
- Tommy Genesis feat. ABRA – Hair Like Water Wavy Like The Sea (2015)
- Hiko Momoji feat. Father & ABRA – Late Nights (2016)
- Ethereal feat. ABRA & Coodie Breeze – Treat You Right (2016)
- Ethereal feat. ABRA – Look At U (2016)
- Chris Brann feat. ABRA – Once Before (2016)
- Father feat. iLoveMakonnen & ABRA – Why Don't You (2016)
- Rich Po Slim feat. ABRA – Make You Mine (2016)
- Stickz Greenz feat. ABRA – Just Chill (2017)
- LiL iFFy feat. ABRA – Dark Times Indeed (2017)
- Charli XCX feat. ABRA – Drugs (2017)
- Da$H feat. ABRA – Deja U (2017)
- josh pan feat. ABRA – give it to ya (2017)
- Father feat. ABRA – Lotto (2018)
- Gorillaz – Sorcererz (2018)
- Toro y Moi feat. ABRA – Miss Me (2019)
- Solange – Sound of Rain (2019)
- Octavian feat. ABRA – My Head (2019)
- Bad Bunny feat. ABRA – SORRY PAPI (2020)
- Boys Noize feat. ABRA – Affection (2021)

=== Remixes ===
- Empress Of – Standard (ABRA Remix) (2015)
- Father – Everybody In The Club (ABRA Remix) (2015)
