= Esser (musician) =

English singer, songwriter, and producer

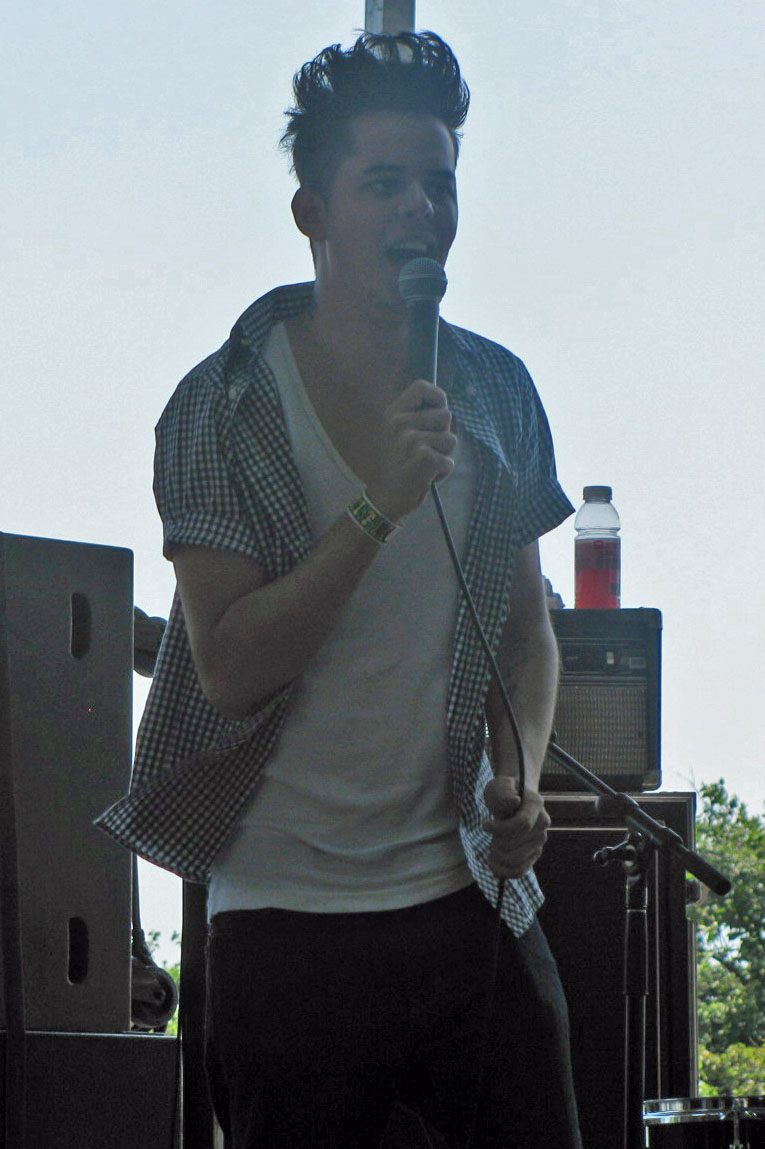
- Esser performing at Lollapalooza 2009

Background information
- Born: Benjamin Joel Esser; 1983 or 1984 (age 42–43); Chelmsford, Essex, England
- Genres: Electropop, indie pop
- Years active: 2006–present
- Labels: Transgressive, Green United Music
- Formerly of: Ladyfuzz

Benjamin Joel Esser (born 1983 or 1984), known mononymously as Esser, is an English singer, songwriter and producer. He is from Chelmsford, Essex and was formerly a drummer for the band Ladyfuzz.

His debut album, Braveface, was released in the UK in May 2009 via Transgressive Records; Esser promoted the record as a support act for the Kaiser Chiefs' UK arena tour and also on his own tour, joined by a live band that included his brother. He released an EP, Enmity, in 2012, taking influence from Krautrock groups such as Cluster and Harmonia.

Esser attended Great Baddow High School. Uniformed students from the school appeared in the video of his single Headlock.

== Discography ==
- Braveface (2009)
- Enmity (2012)

=== Singles ===
- "I Love You" (2008)
- "Satisfied" (2008)
- "Work It Out" (2009)
- "Headlock" (2009)
- "Enmity" (2012)
