= Chilly Gonzales =

Canadian musician (born 1972)

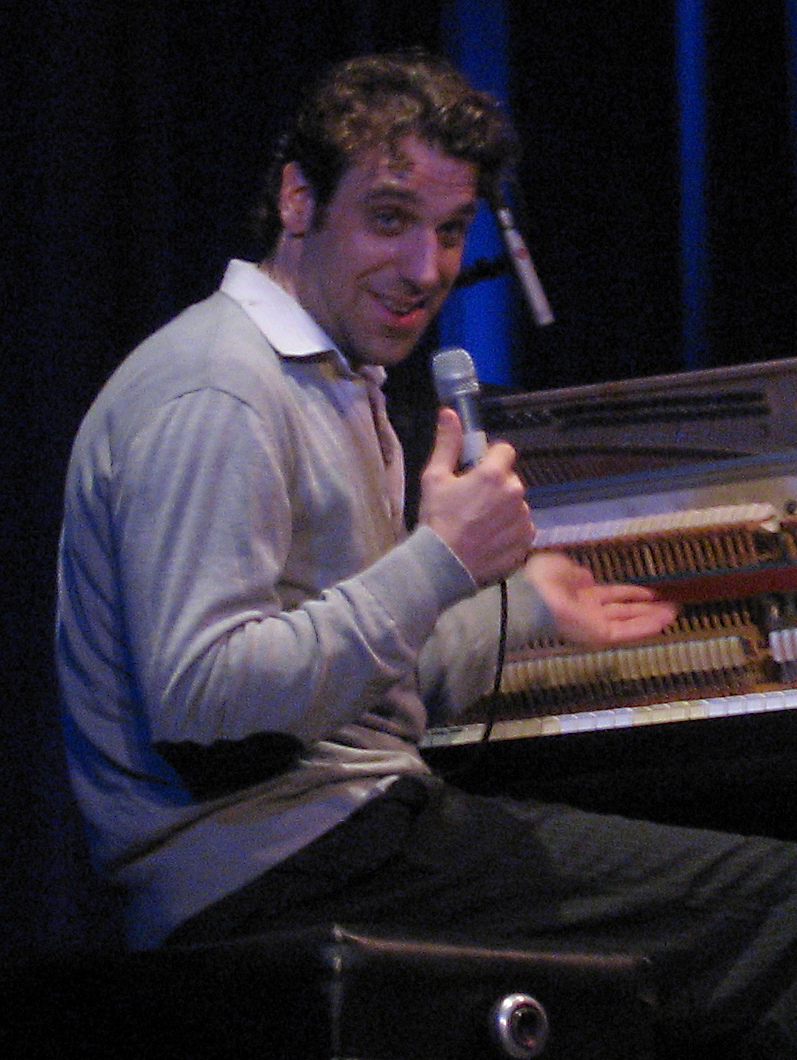
- Gonzales at a concert with Socalled at Théâtre National in Montreal, 2005

Background information
- Also known as: Gonzales
- Born: Jason Charles Beck; 20 March 1972 (age 54)
- Origin: Montreal, Quebec, Canada
- Occupations: Pianist; composer; producer; singer; rapper
- Instruments: Piano; keyboards; vocals
- Label: Gentle Threat
- Website: chillygonzales.com

Jason Charles Beck (born 20 March 1972), known professionally as Chilly Gonzales or just Gonzales, is a Canadian musician and composer. Currently based in London, England, he previously lived for several years in Paris, Berlin, and Cologne.

Gonzales' career spans numerous genres. He is known for his rap albums, his collaborations with singer Feist and rapper Drake, his albums of classical piano compositions (including the Solo Piano trilogy), and for his collaborations with electronic musicians Daft Punk and Boys Noize, the latter of whom he also produces under the moniker Octave Minds. In 2022, he and Plastikman released a piano rework of the latter's 1998 minimal techno classic album Consumed in collaboration with Canadian musician Tiga, titled "Consumed in Key".

Gonzales broadcasts a web series Pop Music Masterclass on WDR, the documentary Classical Connections on BBC Radio 1, The History of Music on Arte, and Music's Cool with Chilly Gonzales on Apple Music's Beats1 radio show. He has written several newspaper and magazine opinion pieces in The Guardian, Vice, Billboard, and others. He won a Grammy award for his work on Daft Punk's 2013 studio album Random Access Memories. Gonzales is the younger brother of film composer Christophe Beck.

== Early life ==
Jason Charles Beck is the son of Ashkenazi Jews who were forced to flee from Hungary during World War II. He began teaching himself piano at age three, when his older brother Christophe began taking lessons. Beck graduated from Crescent School in Toronto, Canada.

He was classically trained as a pianist at McGill University, where he began both his composing career, co-authoring several musicals with his brother, and his performing career, as a jazz pianist.

== Career ==
In the 1990s, Gonzales began a pop career as the leader of the alternative rock band Son, with Dominic Salole and Dave Szigeti. Son was signed to a three-album deal with Warner Music Canada in 1995, a subsidiary of Warner Bros. Records. Their first release, the Prince/Elvis Costello-flavored LP Thriller, was moderately successful, spawning one single that received heavy radio airplay ("Pick up the Phone") and leading to several opening gigs for the Barenaked Ladies. The album's production values were limited—Warner Bros. simply released the band's hastily recorded demo as a record.

Son's second release, Wolfstein, was recorded at a fully equipped studio in Los Angeles with the assistance of his brother Christophe. Nominally a concept album about a man who starts turning into a wolf after hitting one with his car, it features a darker, more complex sensibility than its predecessor. To Warner Music, the album represented too radical a change in direction, and it lacked any singles deemed acceptable for Canadian radio; the most upbeat tune on the album had the radio-unfriendly title "Making a Jew Cry". The label gave little promotional support to the release, and dropped the band soon after.

=== Move to Berlin ===
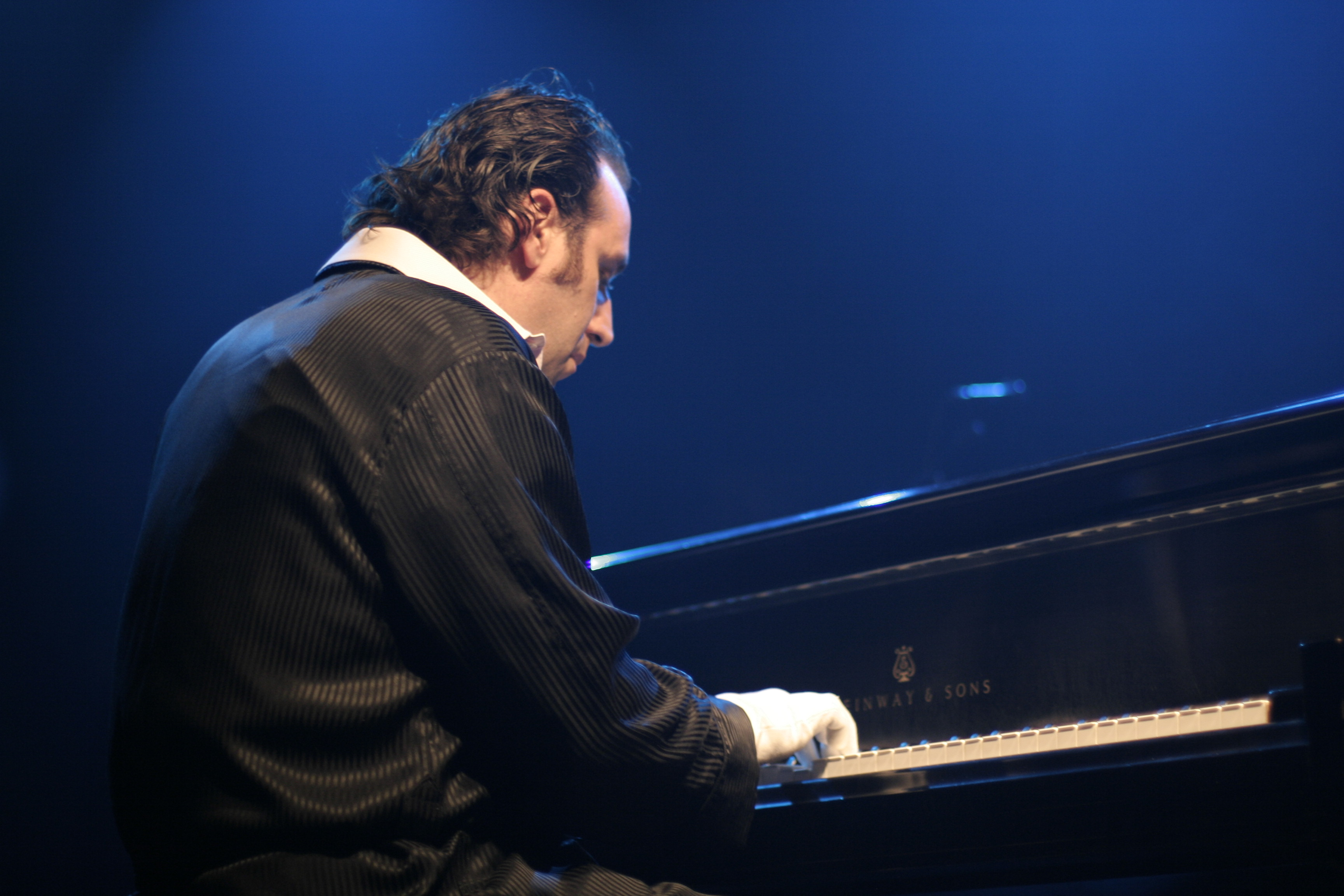
Gonzales at the Mod Club in Toronto 2009

Finding dealing with the expectations of the Canadian music industry difficult, Gonzales moved to Berlin in 1999, despite speaking no German. He declared himself "The President of the Berlin Underground" and adopted the stage name Chilly Gonzales in 1999.

With this change in image came another major change in Gonzales' musical style. His four albums on the German label Kitty-yo (Gonzales Über Alles (1999), The Entertainist (2000), Presidential Suite (2002), and Z (2003)) were recorded as rap records, though his skills as a keyboardist were demonstrated on a series of interspersed instrumental tracks. European critics and audiences were more receptive to the eclectic and experimental nature of Gonzales' output. His first Kitty-yo single, "Let's Groove Again", became a dance floor hit upon its 1999 release. It was used in a 2007 BBC promotional trailer for their new television programme The Restaurant. Gonzales performed regularly at nightclubs and on the summer pop festival circuit.

=== Solo Piano, Chambers, and classical music ===
In 2004, Gonzales released an album of instrumental material, Solo Piano. Praised by public and critics, it drew comparisons to the work of Erik Satie and attracted a new global audience to his work. Solo Piano remains Gonzales's best-selling album to date.

He followed it up nine years later with Solo Piano II, which was long-listed for the 2013 Polaris Music Prize.

In 2015, he released Chambers, a piano and chamber piece recorded with Hamburg's Kaiser Quartett, to generally positive reviews.

The trio of Solo Piano albums was completed with the release of Solo Piano III in September 2018.

=== Collaborations and songwriting ===
In the meantime, Gonzales continued to develop as a producer and songwriter for other artists, collaborating on singles and albums with Peaches, singer Jane Birkin and indie rocker Leslie Feist. The output of the latter collaboration – Feist's 2003 album, Let It Die, became a bestseller, won critical acclaim and industry awards. Gonzales returned as a contributor on Feist's 2007 album, The Reminder, which was nominated for four Grammy Awards and won five Juno Awards.

Apart from his solo career, Gonzales is also a member of the Berlin-based hip-hop group Puppetmastaz.

Gonzales played keyboards in the song "Give Life Back to Music" and piano on "Within" from Daft Punk's 2013 studio album, Random Access Memories, which won a Grammy Award for Album of the Year.

Gonzales collaborated with Jhené Aiko on the track "From Time" from Drake's third album Nothing Was the Same. They met to discuss a collaboration after Gonzales learned that Drake had used the entirety of Gonzales's song "The Tourist" on the track "Outro" from So Far Gone.

In March 2017, Gonzales released Room 29, in collaboration with Jarvis Cocker. The album is a song-cycle, and tells of happenings in one room at a Hollywood hotel. Gonzales and Cocker performed the first concert of the album on the day that it was released, in Hamburg, Germany at the Kampnagel concert hall.

=== Soft Power and Ivory Tower ===
In early 2008, Gonzales signed with Mercury Records, and in April Soft Power was released. While maintaining a typically eclectic mix of styles, Soft Power was recorded as a pop album, with a sound reminiscent of the Bee Gees and Billy Joel. Gonzales chose to sing on the album.

Gonzales' album Ivory Tower (produced by Boys Noize) appeared on the !Earshot National Top 50 Chart in 2010. His song "Never Stop", from the album was one of his better known tunes, and the opening piano tune was featured on Apple Inc.'s worldwide advertising campaign for the iPad 2. Apple adapted the tune for electric guitar.

=== Guinness World record ===
On 18 May 2009, at the Ciné 13 Théâtre in Paris, Gonzales set a world record for the longest solo-artist performance with a total time of 27 hours, 3 minutes and 44 seconds, breaking a record set by Prasanna Gudi. He played over 300 songs during the course of the record attempt.

== Discography ==
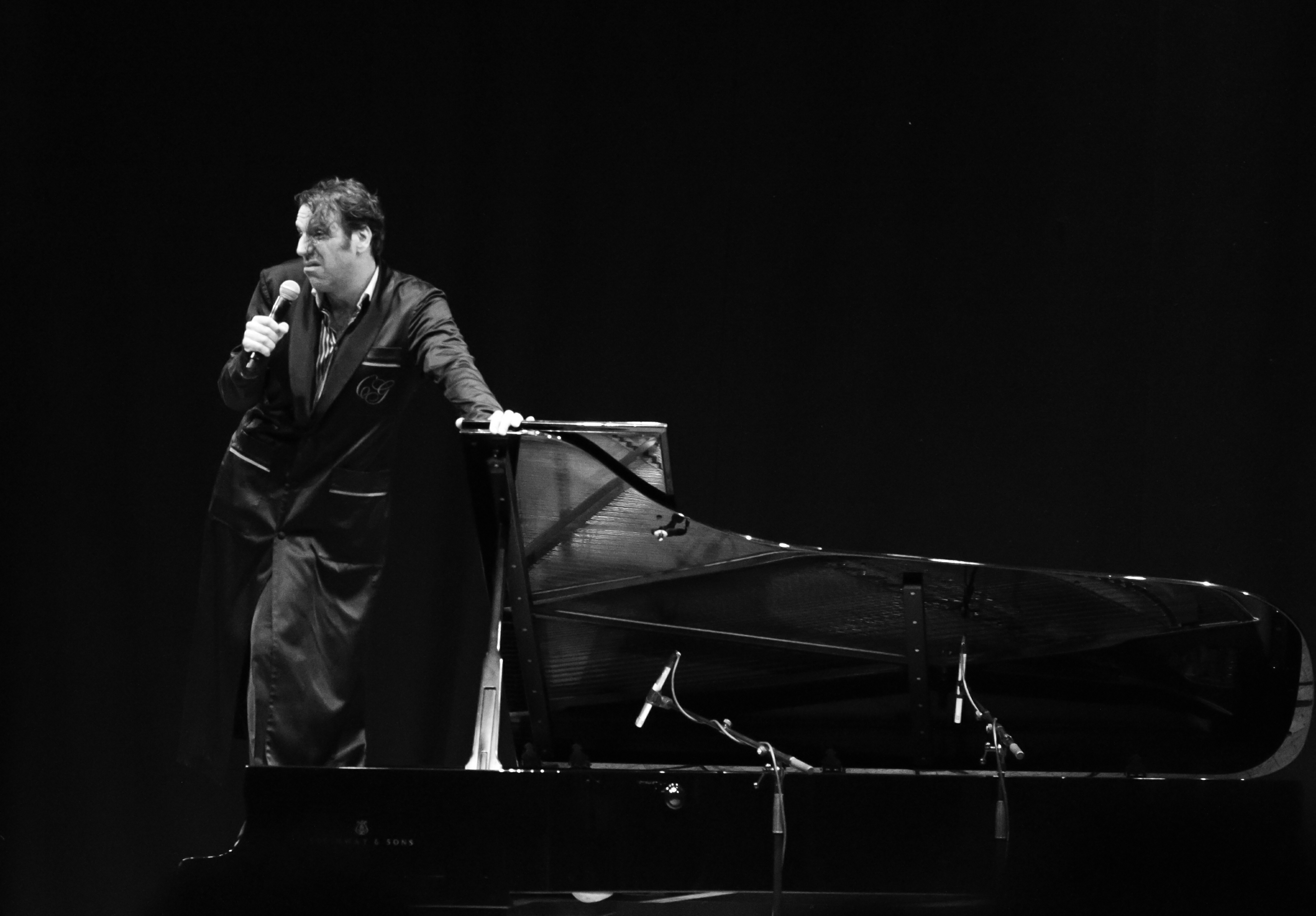
Gonzales in 2012

- Let's Groove Again – Single, 1999 (under the name "Gonzales")
- O.P. Original Prankster – (EP), 1999 (under the name "Gonzales")
- Gonzales Über Alles – Kitty-Yo, 2000 (under the name "Gonzales")
- The Entertainist – Kitty-Yo, 2000
- Presidential Suite – Kitty-Yo, 2002 (under the name "Gonzales")
- Z – Kitty-Yo, 2003 (under the name "Gonzales")
- Daft Punk – "Too Long" from Daft Club, 2003 (under the name "Gonzales")
- Solo Piano – No Format!, 2004 (under the name "Gonzales")
- Soft Power – Mercury/Universal, 2008 (under the name "Gonzales")
- Le Guinness World Record 'The Works', 2009
- Ivory Tower – Gentle Threat, 2010
- The Unspeakable Chilly Gonzales – Gentle Threat, 2011
- Solo Piano II – Gentle Threat, 2012
- Daft Punk – "Give Life Back to Music" and "Within" from Random Access Memories – 2013
- Octave Minds (Chilly Gonzales and Boys Noize) – 2014
- Chambers – Gentle Threat, 2015
- Room 29 (Chilly Gonzales and Jarvis Cocker) – 2017
- Live at Massey Hall – Gentle Threat, 2018
- Other People's Pieces – Gentle Threat, 2018
- Solo Piano III – Gentle Threat, 2018
- A Very Chilly Christmas – 2020
- Consumed in Key (Plastikman & Chilly Gonzales) – 2022
- He Thinks That I'm an Angel (Goldie Boutilier & Chilly Gonzales) from Cowboy Gangster Politician EP – 2022
- Daft Punk – "GLBTM (Studio Outtakes)" from Random Access Memories (10th Anniversary Edition) – 2023
- French Kiss – Gentle Threat, 2023
- F*CK WAGNER – Single, 2024
- Gonzo – Gentle Threat, 2024

== Other work ==
=== DVD content ===
- From Major to Minor – 2006 – No Format!
- The Unspeakable Chilly Gonzales Live with Orchestra – May 2012 – Gentle Threat

=== Filmography ===
Year	Film	Role	Notes
2010	Ivory Tower	Hershell	Independent film co-written with Céline Sciamma and co-starring Peaches, Feist and Tiga

=== Radio show ===
In 2016, Gonzales hosted Music's Cool, a two-hour radio show on the Apple Music radio station Beats 1. In the show, he analysed the musical theory behind various artists, including past collaborators and music icons.

=== The Gonzervatory (music school) ===
In 2018, Gonzales launched his own music school. Seven musicians from around the world joined him to study at "The Gonzervatory", an eight-day all-expenses-paid residential music performance workshop in Paris. The workshop included coaching sessions hosted by Gonzales, followed by masterclasses from Gonzales' friends and collaborators including Peaches, Socalled, Fred Wesley, and Jarvis Cocker. Evening rehearsals culminated in a finale concert at the Trianon Theater.

=== Books ===
In 2020, Gonzales published a book called Enya: A Treatise on Unguilty Pleasures. He discussed his childhood appreciation for Enya in a metaphorical context, recognizing the factor of involuntary taste on music choice rather than the factors of outside influences and social judgement.
