= Mr. Oizo discography =

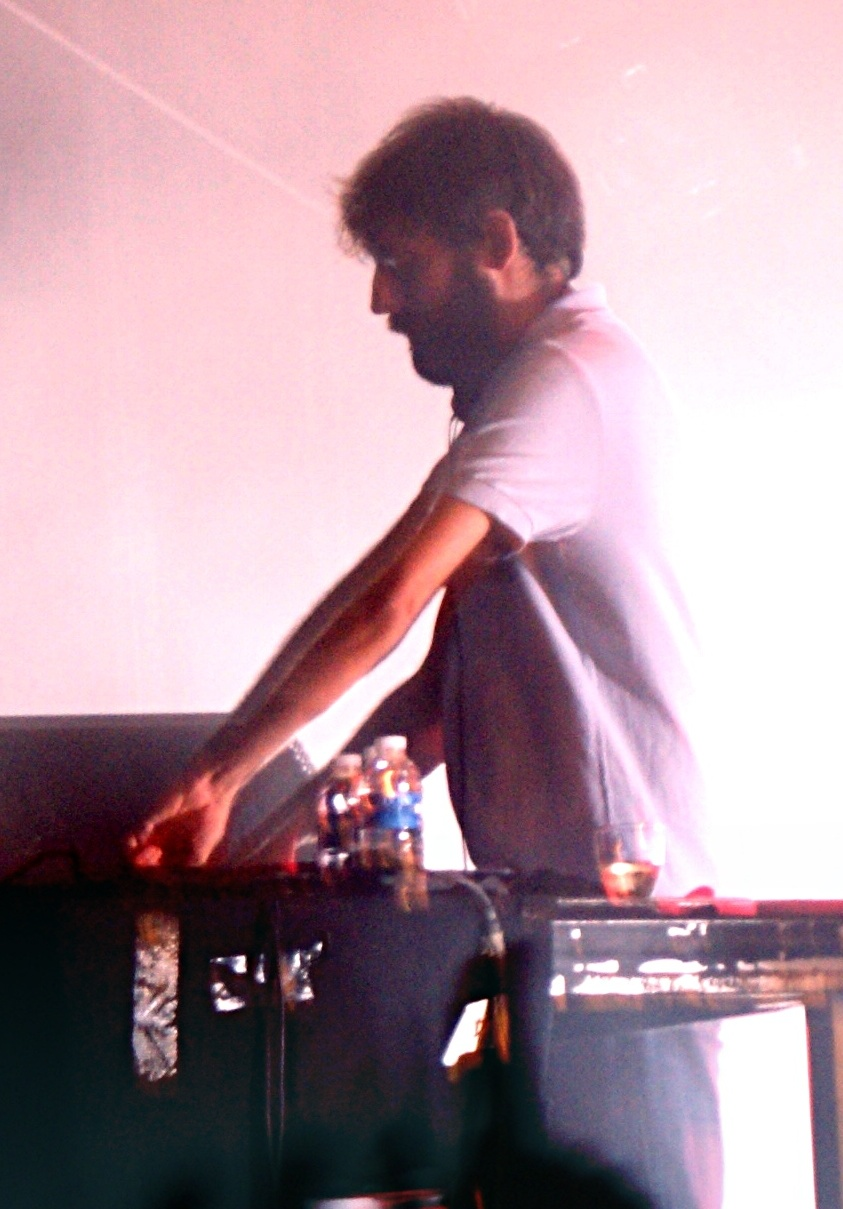
- Mr. Oizo at Les Nuits Secrètes in 2009
- Studio albums: 7
- EPs: 6
- Soundtrack albums: 3
- Compilation albums: 2
- Singles: 8
- Music videos: 8

The following is a comprehensive discography of French musician Mr. Oizo. His discography comprises seven studio albums, two compilation albums, three soundtrack albums, six extended plays, eight singles and eight music videos.

== Albums ==
=== Studio albums ===
Title	Details	Peak chart positions		
Title	Details	FRA	BEL	US Dance
Analog Worms Attack	Release date: 11 October 1999; Label: F Communications; Formats: CD, vinyl	56	—	—
Moustache (Half a Scissor)	Release date: 4 October 2005; Label: F Communications; Formats: CD, digital download, vinyl	—	—	—
Lambs Anger	Release date: 17 November 2008; Label: Ed Banger; Formats: CD, digital download, vinyl	142	—	—
Stade 2	Release date: 18 November 2011; Label: Ed Banger; Formats: CD, digital download, vinyl	—	—	—
The Church	Release date: 17 November 2014; Label: Brainfeeder; Formats: CD, digital download, vinyl	—	—	—
All Wet	Release date: 30 September 2016; Label: Ed Banger; Formats: CD, digital download, vinyl	56	128	24
Voilà (with Phra)	Release date: 18 February 2022; Label: Ed Banger; Formats: CD, digital download, vinyl	—	152	—
"—" denotes a release that did not chart or was not released in that territory

=== Compilation albums ===
Title	Details
Unreleased Unfinished Unpleasant	Release date: November 2012; Label: None (self released); Formats: Digital download
Wrong Cops (Best Of)	Release date: 24 February 2014; Label: Ed Banger Records; Formats: CD, digital download, vinyl

=== Soundtrack albums ===
Title	Details
Steak (with Sébastien Tellier and SebastiAn)	Release date: 3 November 2007; Label: Ed Banger Records; Formats: CD, digital download
Rubber (with Gaspard Augé)	Release date: November 2010; Label: Ed Banger Records; Formats: CD, digital download
Wrong (with Tahiti Boy and the Palmtree Family)	Release date: 27 August 2012; Label: Ed Banger Records; Formats: CD, digital download, vinyl
L'Accident de piano (with Chilly Gonzales)	Release date: 2 July 2025; Label: Ed Banger Records; Formats: Digital download, vinyl

== Extended plays ==
Title	Details
#1	Release date: September 1997; Label: F Communications; Formats: CD, vinyl
M-Seq	Release date: 1998; Label: F Communications; Formats: CD, digital download, vinyl
Nazis	Release date: 19 May 2006; Label: F Communications; Formats: Digital download, vinyl
Transsexual	Release date: 5 June 2007; Label: Ed Banger Records; Formats: Digital download, vinyl
Stade 3	Release date: 9 July 2012; Label: Ed Banger Records; Formats: Digital download, vinyl
Amicalement	Release date: 5 August 2013; Label: None (self released); Formats: Digital download, vinyl
Rythme Plat	Release date: 22 March 2019; Label: Ed Banger Records; Formats: Digital download, vinyl

== Singles ==
Title	Year	Peak chart positions										Certifications (sales thresholds)	Album
Title	Year	AUT	BEL (Fl)	BEL (Wa)	FRA	NED	NOR	NZ	SWE	SWI	UK	Certifications (sales thresholds)	Album
"Analog Worms Attack"	1999	—	—	—	—	—	—	—	—	—	—		Analog Worms Attack
"Flat Beat"	1999	1	1	2	5	5	2	12	4	4	1	BPI: Platinum; BVMI: Platinum; IFPI AUT: Gold; IFPI FIN: Gold	Analog Worms Attack
"Last Night a DJ Killed My Dog"	2000	—	—	—	—	—	—	—	—	—	—		Analog Worms Attack
"Stunt"	2004	—	—	—	—	—	—	—	—	—	—		Moustache (Half a Scissor)
"Positif"	2008	—	—	—	90	—	—	—	—	—	—		Lambs Anger
"Pourriture"	2009	—	—	—	73	—	—	—	—	—	—		Lambs Anger
"Hand in the Fire" (featuring Charli XCX)	2015	—	—	—	124	—	—	—	—	—	—		All Wet
"End of the World" (featuring Skrillex)	2016	—	—	—	—	—	—	—	—	—	—		All Wet
"Pharmacist" (featuring Roméo Elvis)	2020	—	—	—	8	—	—	—	—	—	—		Non-album single
"Ratata" (with Skrillex and Missy Elliott)	2023	—	—	—	—	—	—	—	—	—	—		Quest For Fire
"—" denotes a release that did not chart or was not released in that territory

== Remixes ==
- Mr. Oizo - Kirk ("Intro (Kirk's Back)" Mr. Oizo Remix)
- Mr. Oizo - Monday Massacre ("No Day Massacre" Mr. Oizo Remix)
- Demon - The Nod Factor (Mr. Oizo's Egg Factor)
- Ark - Punkadelik (Mr. Oizo Remix)
- Alex Gopher - Time (Mr. Oizo for Dogs Remix)
- Mr. Oizo - Last Night A DJ Killed My Dog (Electroshit Non Stop)
- Herbert - Back To The Start (Mr. Oizo Non Mix)
- Doctor. L - Strange Shit Happens (Mr. Oizo Mix)
- Techno Animal - We Can Build You (ft. EL-P & Vast Aire Kramer) (Mr. Oizo Remix)
- Ark - Sucubz (Mr. Oizo Remix)
- Air - Don't Be Light (Mr. Oizo Remix)
- Feadz - Maxi Beef (Mr. Oizo's Beef Remix)
- Kavinsky - Testarossa Autodrive ("Mr. Oizo Autodrive T42" Mr. Oizo Remix)
- Cassius - Toop Toop (Mr Oizo Mix)
- Jamelia - Something About You (Mr. Oizo Remix)
- Scissor Sisters - Kiss You Off (Mr. Oizo Remix)
- Calvin Harris - Merrymaking At My Place (Mr. Oizo Remix)
- Jamie Lidell - Little Bit of Feel Good (Mr. Oizo Mix)
- Busy P - To Protect and Entertain (ft. MURS) (Mr. Oizo Remix)
- Mr. Oizo - Steroids (ft. Uffie) (Mr. Oizo Remix)
- Mr. Oizo - Lars Von Sen ("X-Mas" Mr. Oizo Remix)
- Tiga - Shoes (Mr. Oizo Remix)
- Boys Noize - Transmission (Mr. Oizo Remix)
- Squarepusher - Cryptic Motion (Mr. Oizo Remix)
- N.A.S.A. - Strange Enough (ft. Karen O, Ol' Dirty Bastard and Fatlip) (Mr. Oizo Remix)
- Justice - Civilization (Mr. Oizo Remix)
- Ryskee - Horrors Of Love ("Horrors Of Love By Mr. Oizo" Mr. Oizo Remix)
- Para One - Mother (Mr. Oizo Remix)
- Chromeo - Over Your Shoulder (Mr. Oizo Remix)
- Dog Blood - Chella Ride (Mr. Oizo Remix)
- Mocky - Soulful Beat (Mr. Oizo Remix)
- Mr. Oizo - Hand In The Fire (ft. Charli XCX) (Remix)
- Boys Noize - Midnight (Boys Noize & Mr. Oizo "Handbraekes" Remix)
- MSTRKRFT - Party Line (Mr. Oizo Remix)
- Chris Lake - Operator (Ring Ring) (ft. Dances With White Girls) (Mr. Oizo Remix)
