= List of UK singles chart number ones of the 1990s =

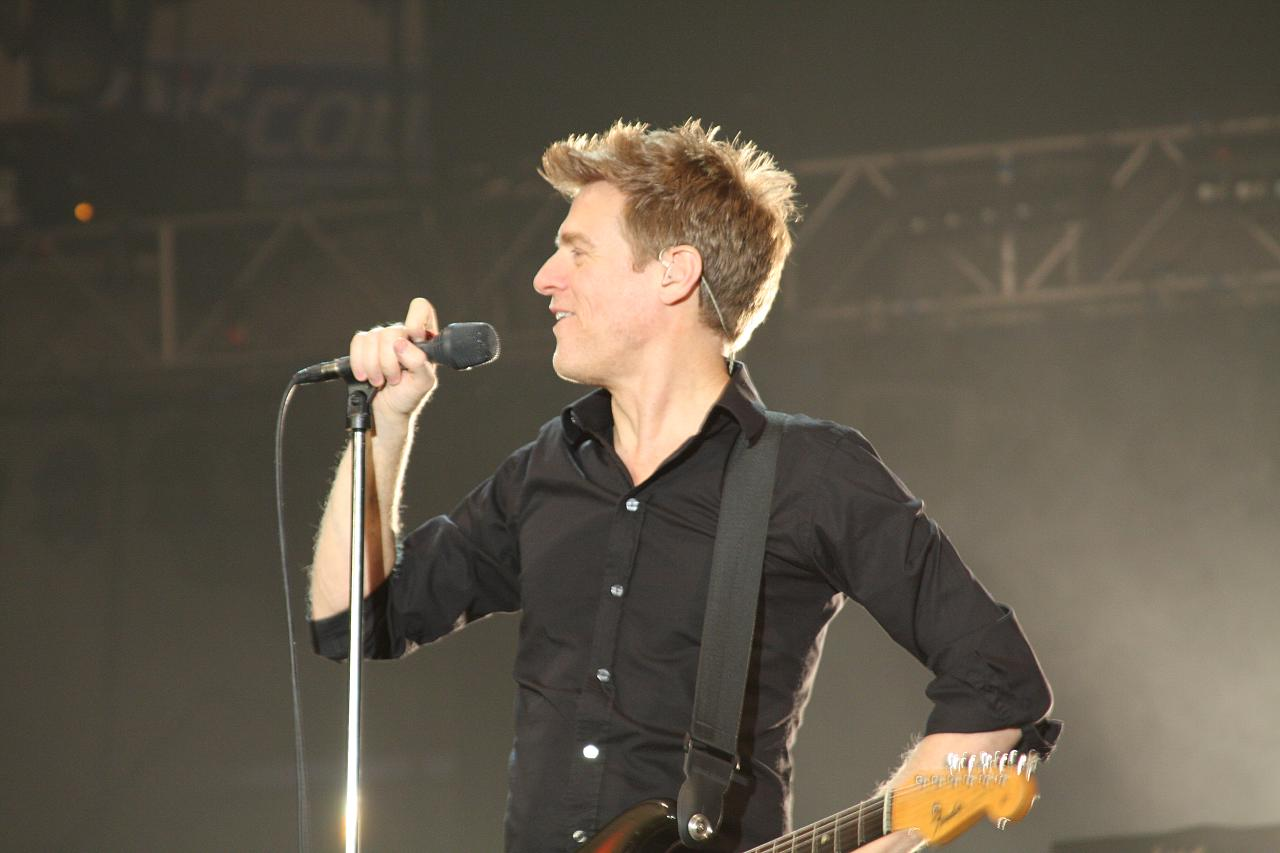
Bryan Adams set a record in 1991 for the longest run at the top of the UK charts.

The UK singles chart is a record chart compiled on behalf of the British record industry. Until 1 February 1994, the chart was compiled each week by Gallup – after this date, it was managed by Millward Brown, who expanded the number of sales figures sampled, and extended the use of electronic point of sale machines. From July 1998 onwards, compilation of the chart was overseen by The Chart Information Network (CIN) and it was based entirely on sales of physical singles from retail outlets – airplay statistics are not used in compiling the official UK singles chart. The chart week ran from Sunday to Saturday, and the Top 40 was first revealed on BBC Radio 1 on a Sunday. Record companies began making singles available to radio stations much further in advance of their release dates and making greater use of direct marketing techniques in the 1990s. As a result, the number of singles that entered the charts at number one increased dramatically, and it became commonplace for singles to enter the charts at the top and then plummet down the listing soon after.

During the decade, 206 singles reached the number-one position on the chart. "Hangin' Tough" by New Kids on the Block reached number one on the first new chart of the decade, replacing "Do They Know It's Christmas?" by Band Aid II which had been number one on the last chart issued in 1989. The longest spell at the top was achieved by Bryan Adams's song "(Everything I Do) I Do It for You", which spent 16 weeks at number one in 1991, beating the record for the longest unbroken run at the top of the charts which had been held by Slim Whitman's "Rose Marie" since 1955. Wet Wet Wet and Whitney Houston also had runs of 10 or more weeks at number one during the 1990s. Although it only spent five weeks at number one, Elton John's 1997 single "Candle in the Wind 1997" / "Something About the Way You Look Tonight" sold almost 5 million copies, becoming the biggest-selling single in UK history. Cher's song "Believe" spent 7 weeks at number-one at the end of 1998 and became the biggest-selling single by a female artist in UK history. Also, Cher is the female solo artist with the most number-one singles in the 1990s (a total of three) and the female solo artist with most weeks at number one (13). The final number one of the decade was the double A-side "I Have a Dream" / "Seasons in the Sun" by Westlife. Take That and the Spice Girls share the distinction of having achieved the most number-one hits in the 1990s, with eight each.

== Number-one singles ==
Key
†	Best-selling single of the year
‡	Best-selling single of the decade

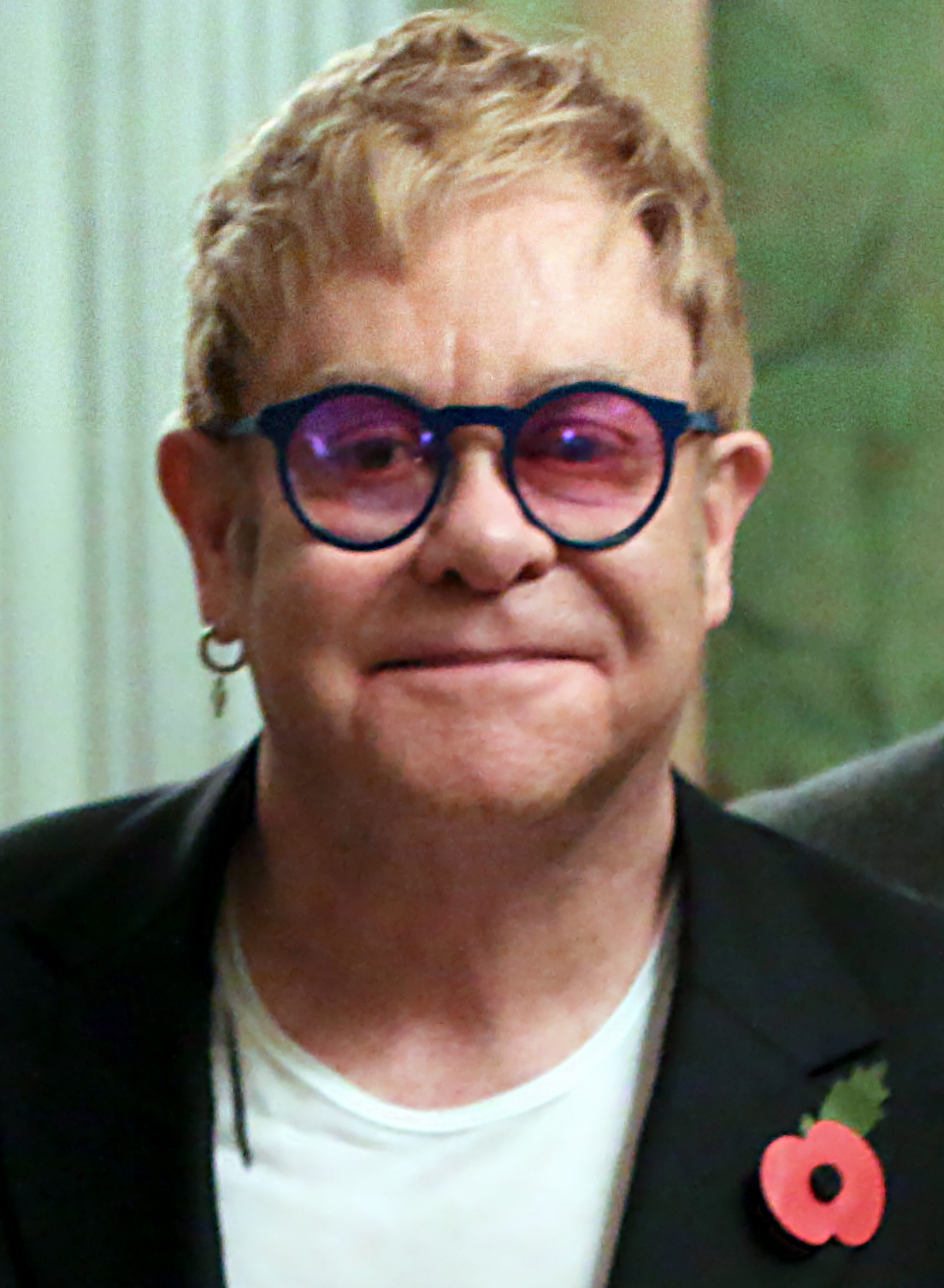
Elton John scored his first solo number one in 1990.

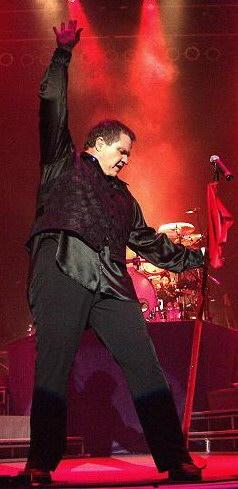
After more than a decade without a hit, Meat Loaf topped the charts for the first time in 1993.

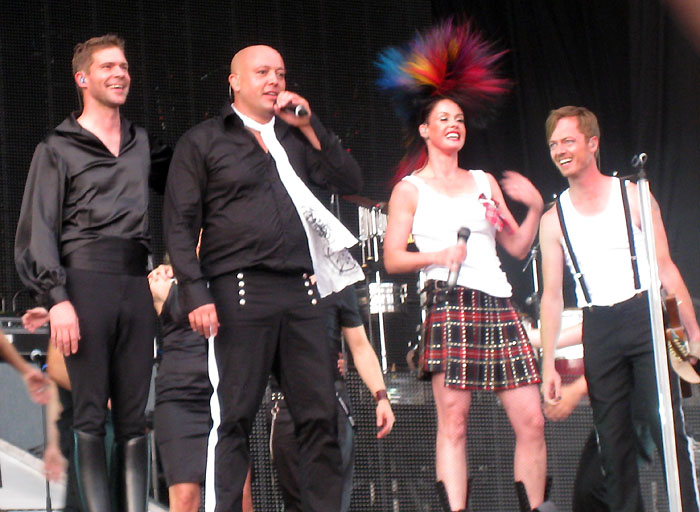
Danish pop band Aqua scored three consecutive number ones with one of the UK's biggest selling singles "Barbie Girl" in 1997, and the follow up's "Doctor Jones" and "Turn Back Time" in 1998 making them one of the most successful bands this decade.

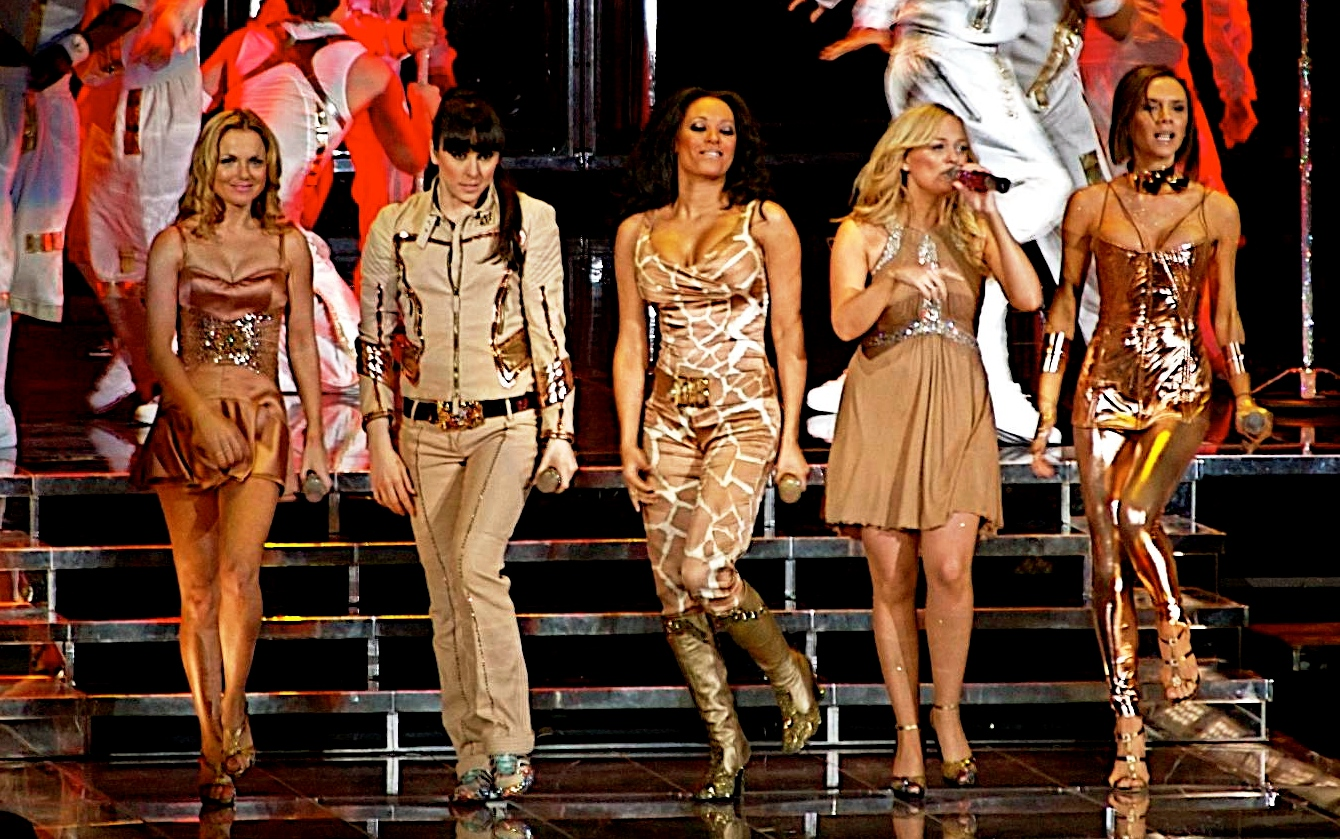
Spice Girls became the biggest act of the decade after they dominated the charts with eight out of their nine number one singles achieved in the '90s; "Wannabe", "Say You'll Be There", "2 Become 1", "Mama", "Spice Up Your Life", "Too Much", "Viva Forever" and "Goodbye".

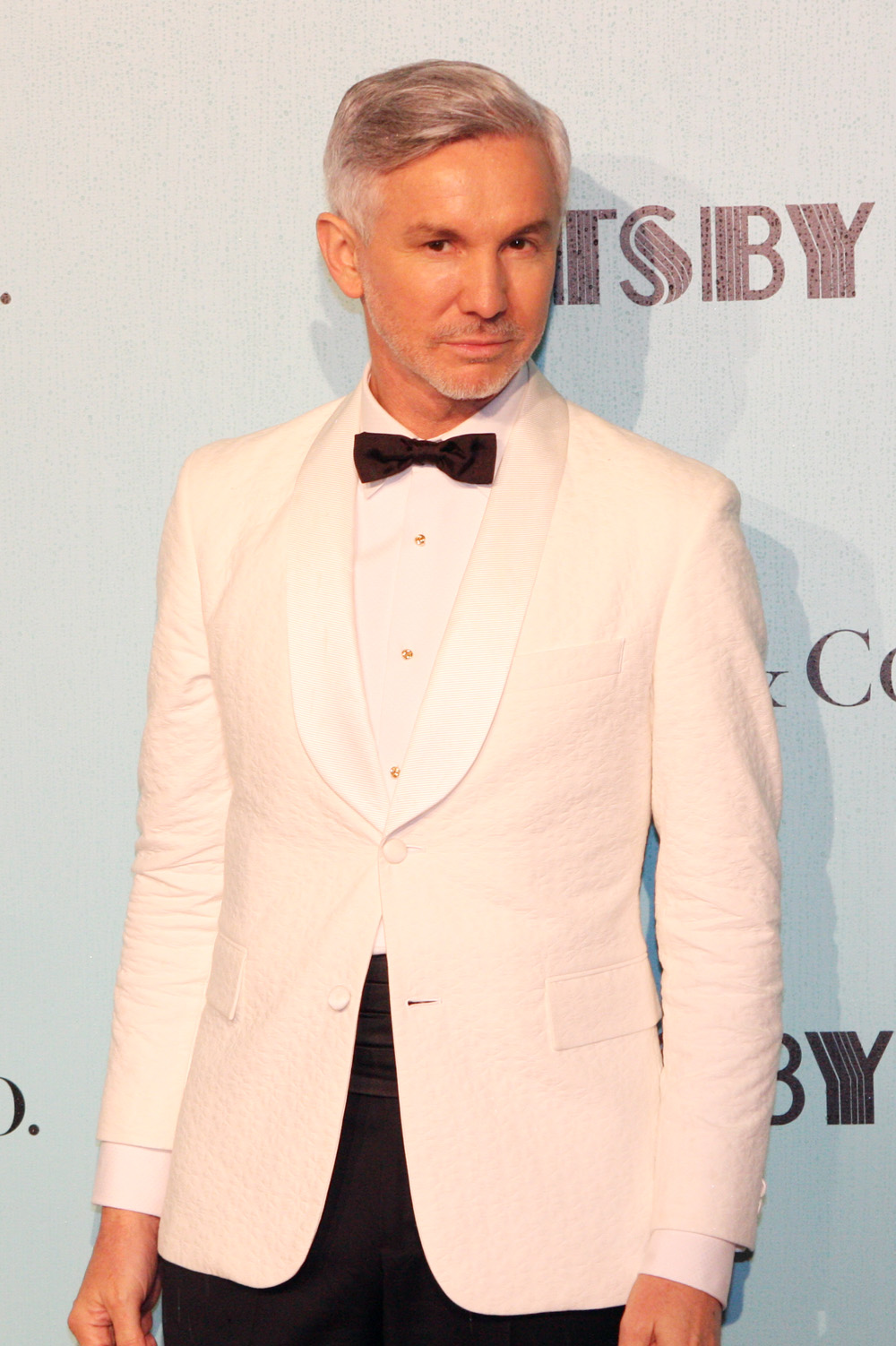
In 1999, Australian film director Baz Luhrmann scored a number-one hit with "Everybody's Free (To Wear Sunscreen)" after a radio campaign by Chris Moyles.

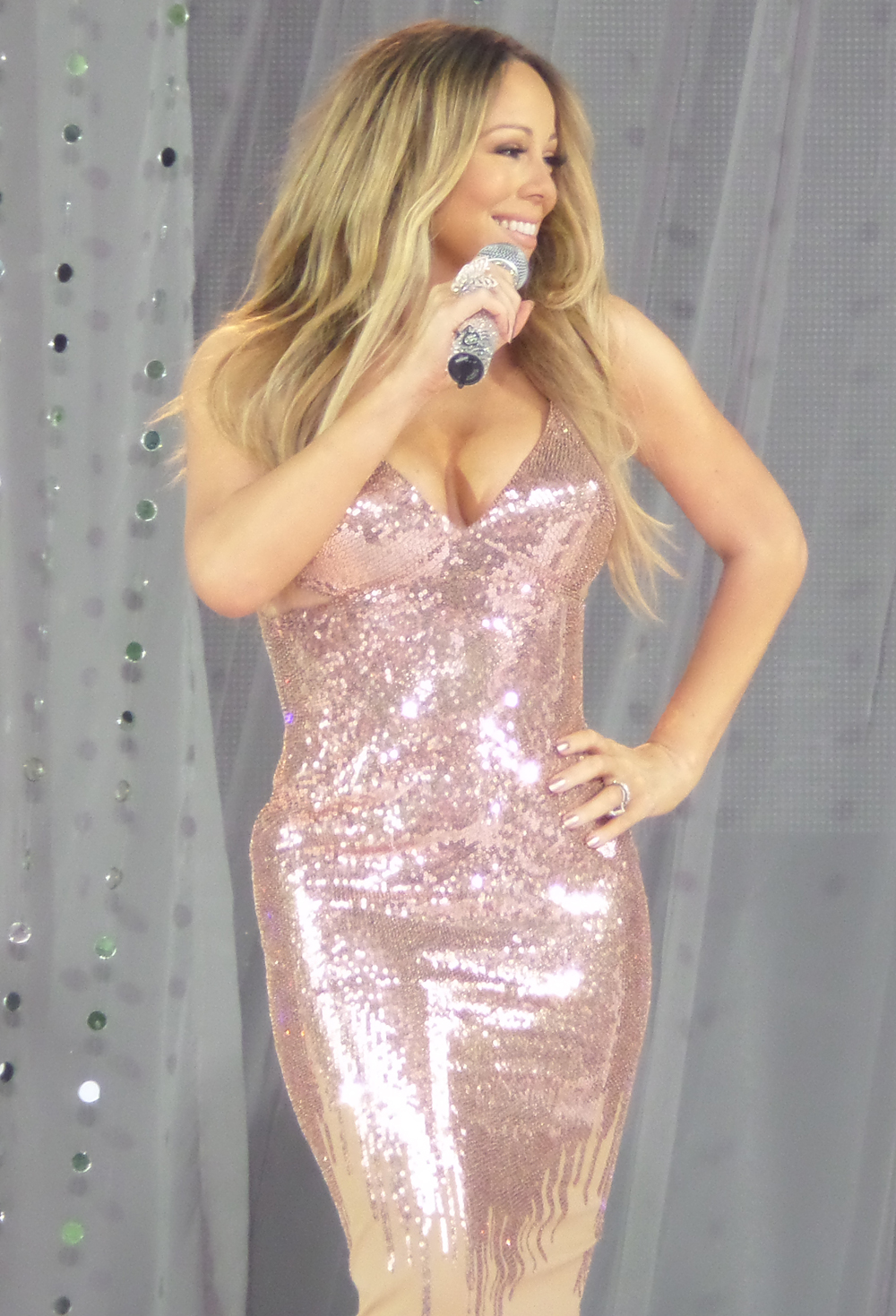
Mariah Carey scored her first solo UK number one single in 1994.

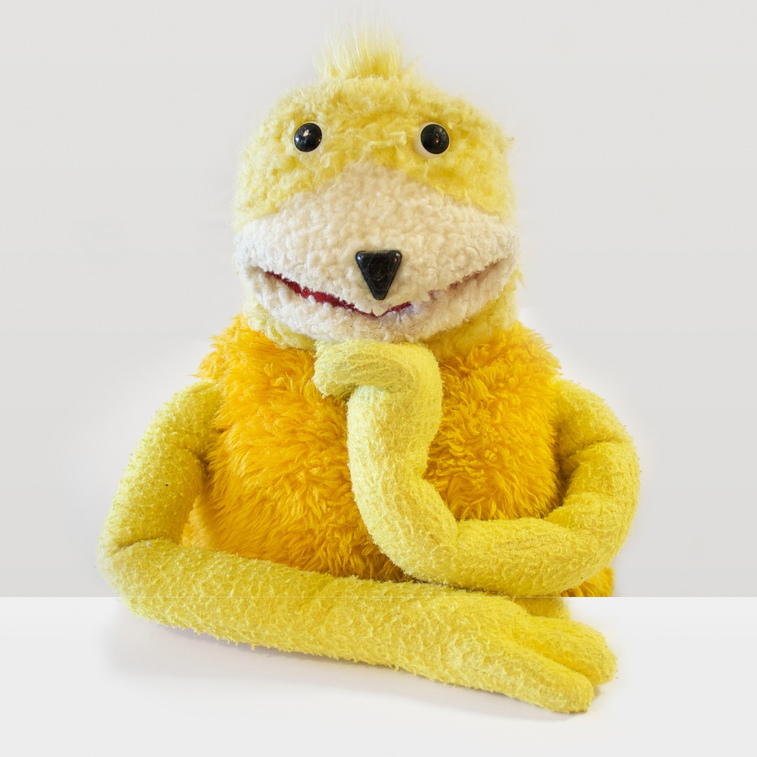
In 1999 an advert for Levi jeans featuring the puppet Flat Eric helped take Mr. Oizo's track "Flat Beat" to number one

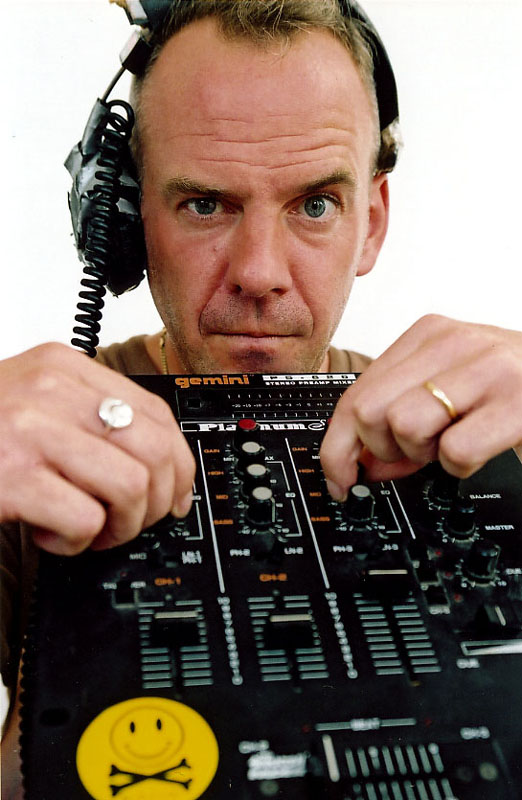
Fatboy Slim achieved commercial success in the 1990s, but Norman Cook had had several hits with other groups (including number-ones with the Housemartins and Beats International) prior to his only solo number-one single, "Praise You" in 1999.

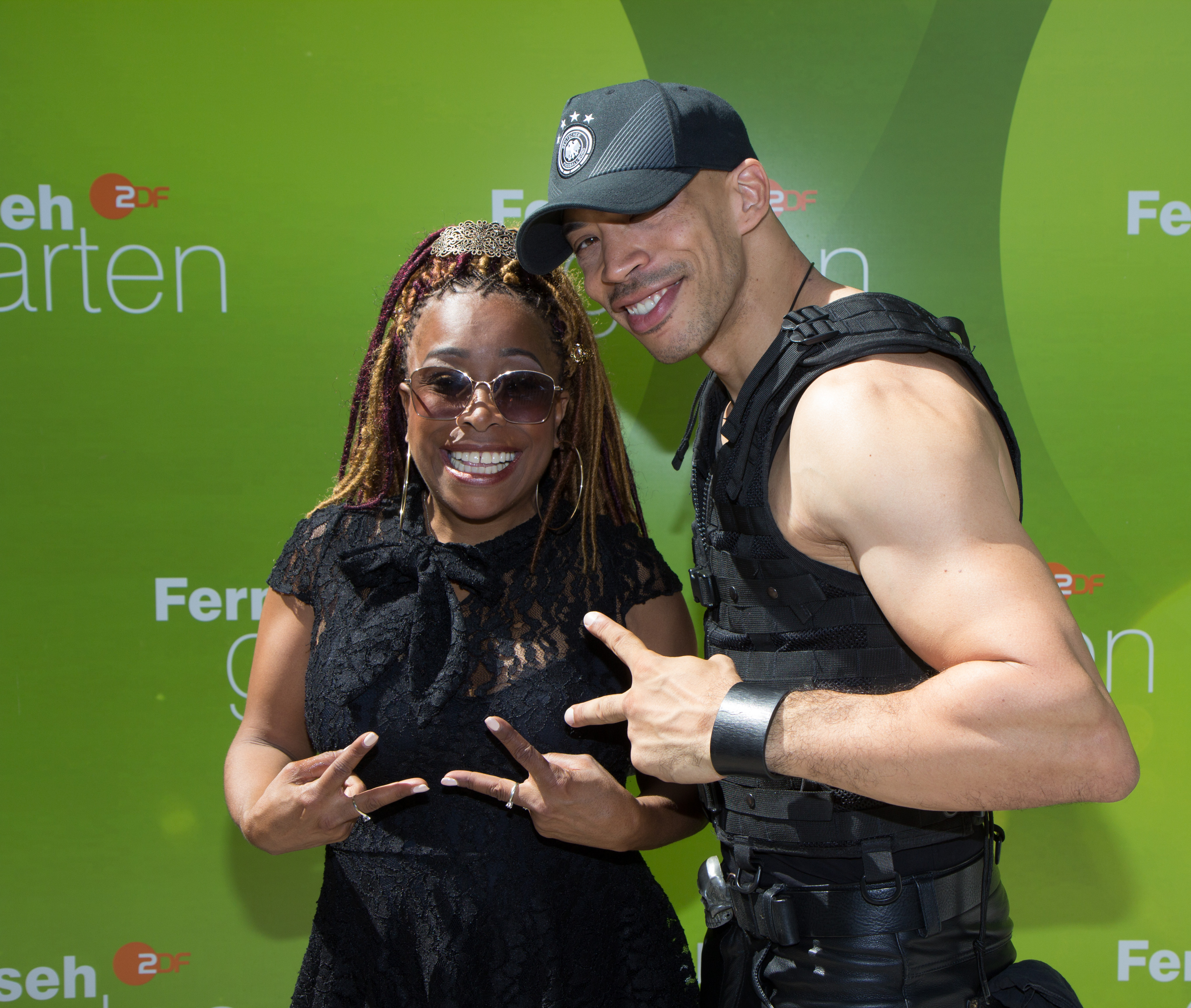
German Eurodance group Snap! gained two massive number ones, first in 1990 with "The Power" and then in 1992 with their biggest hit to date "Rhythm Is a Dancer".

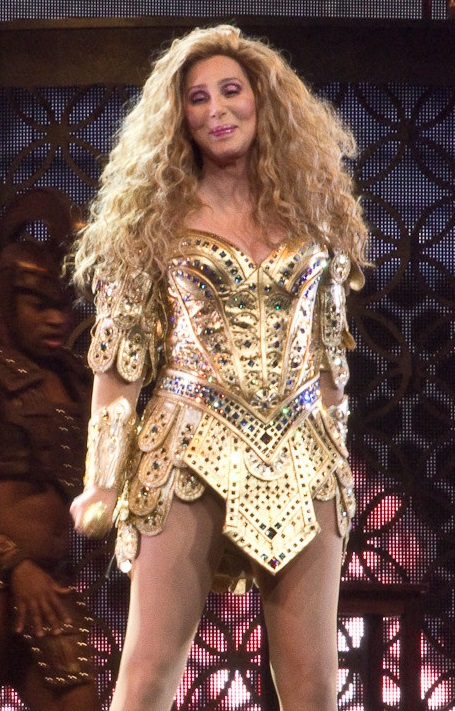
Cher managed to spend a total of thirteen weeks at number one this decade; The Shoop Shoop Song (It's in His Kiss)", the Comic Relief charity single "Love Can Build a Bridge" with Neneh Cherry, Chrissie Hynde and Eric Clapton, and one of the world's biggest selling singles "Believe".

No.	Artist (Note: The artist, song name, date of number-one and duration are those given by The Official Charts Company. The dates are those for the Saturday after publication. The actual sales week represented is that up to and including the previous Saturday (i.e. from 13 to 7 days prior to the chart date).)	Single	Record label (Note: The record labels are those given by the OCC.)	Week ending date	Weeks at number one
1990
638	Band Aid II	"Do They Know It's Christmas?"	PWL	23 December 1989	3
639	New Kids on the Block	"Hangin' Tough"	CBS	13 January 1990	2
640	Kylie Minogue	"Tears on My Pillow"	PWL	27 January 1990	1
641	Sinéad O'Connor	"Nothing Compares 2 U"	Ensign	3 February 1990	4
642	Beats International	"Dub Be Good to Me"	Go! Beat	3 March 1990	4
643	Snap!	"The Power"	Arista	31 March 1990	2
644	Madonna	"Vogue"	Sire	14 April 1990	4
645	Adamski	"Killer"	MCA	12 May 1990	4
646	New Order	"World in Motion"	Factory	9 June 1990	2
647	Elton John	"Sacrifice" / "Healing Hands"	Rocket	23 June 1990	5
648	Partners in Kryme	"Turtle Power"	SBK	28 July 1990	4
649	Bombalurina	"Itsy Bitsy Teenie Weenie Yellow Polka Dot Bikini"	Carpet	25 August 1990	3
650	Steve Miller Band	"The Joker" (Note: For the week ending 15 September 1990, "The Joker" was tied with Deee-Lite's "Groove Is in the Heart" for the number of copies sold. Due to a rule introduced in the 1980s, the song that had climbed the most in the charts from the previous weeks was classified as number-one – "The Joker" climbed five places and "Groove Is in the Heart" had climbed three places. As a result of this controversial technicality, the rule was later scrapped and it was announced that "The Joker" had sold eight more copies after sales figures had been reviewed.)	Capitol	15 September 1990	2
651	Maria McKee	"Show Me Heaven"	Epic	29 September 1990	4
652	The Beautiful South	"A Little Time"	Go! Discs	27 October 1990	1
653	The Righteous Brothers	"Unchained Melody" †	Verve/Polydor	3 November 1990	4
654	Vanilla Ice	"Ice Ice Baby"	SBK	1 December 1990	4
655	Cliff Richard	"Saviour's Day"	EMI	29 December 1990	1
1991
656	Iron Maiden	"Bring Your Daughter... to the Slaughter"	EMI	5 January 1991	2
657	Enigma	"Sadness (Part I)"	Virgin International	19 January 1991	1
658	Queen	"Innuendo"	Parlophone	26 January 1991	1
659	The KLF	"3 a.m. Eternal"	KLF Communications	2 February 1991	2
660	The Simpsons	"Do the Bartman"	Geffen	16 February 1991	3
661	The Clash	"Should I Stay or Should I Go"	Columbia	9 March 1991	2
662	Hale and Pace and the Stonkers	"The Stonk"	London	23 March 1991	1
663	Chesney Hawkes	"The One and Only"	Chrysalis	30 March 1991	5
664	Cher	"The Shoop Shoop Song (It's in His Kiss)"	Epic	4 May 1991	5
665	Color Me Badd	"I Wanna Sex You Up"	Giant	8 June 1991	3
666	Jason Donovan	"Any Dream Will Do"	Really Useful	29 June 1991	2
667	Bryan Adams	"(Everything I Do) I Do It for You" †	A&M	13 July 1991	16
668	U2	"The Fly"	Island	2 November 1991	1
669	Vic Reeves and The Wonder Stuff	"Dizzy"	Sense	9 November 1991	2
670	Michael Jackson	"Black or White"	Epic	23 November 1991	2
671	George Michael and Elton John	"Don't Let the Sun Go Down on Me"	Epic	7 December 1991	2
672	Queen	"Bohemian Rhapsody" / "These Are the Days of Our Lives"	Parlophone	21 December 1991	5
1992
673	Wet Wet Wet	"Goodnight Girl"	The Precious Organisation	25 January 1992	4
674	Shakespears Sister	"Stay"	London	22 February 1992	8
675	Right Said Fred	"Deeply Dippy"	Tug	18 April 1992	3
676	KWS	"Please Don't Go"	Network	9 May 1992	5
677	Erasure	Abba-esque (EP)	Mute	13 June 1992	5
678	Jimmy Nail	"Ain't No Doubt"	East West	18 July 1992	3
679	Snap!	"Rhythm Is a Dancer"	Arista	8 August 1992	6
680	The Shamen	"Ebeneezer Goode"	One Little Indian	19 September 1992	4
681	Tasmin Archer	"Sleeping Satellite"	EMI	17 October 1992	2
682	Boyz II Men	"End of the Road"	Motown	31 October 1992	3
683	Charles & Eddie	"Would I Lie to You?"	Capitol	21 November 1992	2
684	Whitney Houston	"I Will Always Love You" †	Arista	5 December 1992	10
1993
685	2 Unlimited	"No Limit"	PWL Continental	13 February 1993	5
686	Shaggy	"Oh Carolina"	Greensleeves	20 March 1993	2
687	The Bluebells	"Young at Heart"	London	3 April 1993	4
688	George Michael and Queen with Lisa Stansfield	Five Live (EP)	Parlophone	1 May 1993	3
689	Ace of Base	"All That She Wants"	London	22 May 1993	3
690	UB40	"(I Can't Help) Falling in Love With You"	DEP International	12 June 1993	2
691	Gabrielle	"Dreams"	Go! Beat	26 June 1993	3
692	Take That	"Pray"	RCA	17 July 1993	4
693	Freddie Mercury	"Living on My Own"	Parlophone	14 August 1993	2
694	Culture Beat	"Mr. Vain"	Epic	28 August 1993	4
695	DJ Jazzy Jeff & the Fresh Prince	"Boom! Shake the Room"	Jive	25 September 1993	2
696	Take That featuring Lulu	"Relight My Fire"	RCA	9 October 1993	2
697	Meat Loaf	"I'd Do Anything for Love (But I Won't Do That)" †	Virgin	23 October 1993	7
698	Mr Blobby	"Mr Blobby"	Destiny Music	11 December 1993	1
699	Take That	"Babe"	RCA	18 December 1993	1
re	Mr Blobby	"Mr Blobby"	Destiny Music	25 December 1993	2
1994
700	Chaka Demus & Pliers featuring Jack Radics and Taxi Gang	"Twist and Shout"	Mango	8 January 1994	2
701	D:Ream	"Things Can Only Get Better"	Magnet	22 January 1994	4
702	Mariah Carey	"Without You"	Columbia	19 February 1994	4
703	Doop	"Doop"	Citybeat	19 March 1994	3
704	Take That	"Everything Changes"	RCA	9 April 1994	2
705	Prince	"The Most Beautiful Girl in the World"	NPG	23 April 1994	2
706	Tony Di Bart	"The Real Thing"	Cleveland City Blues	7 May 1994	1
707	Stiltskin	"Inside"	White Water	14 May 1994	1
708	Manchester United F.C.	"Come On You Reds"	Polydor	21 May 1994	2
709	Wet Wet Wet	"Love Is All Around" †	The Precious Organisation	4 June 1994	15
710	Whigfield	"Saturday Night"	Systematic	17 September 1994	4
711	Take That	"Sure"	RCA	15 October 1994	2
712	Pato Banton featuring Ali and Robin Campbell	"Baby Come Back"	Virgin	29 October 1994	4
713	Baby D	"Let Me Be Your Fantasy"	Systematic	26 November 1994	2
714	East 17	"Stay Another Day"	London	10 December 1994	5
1995
715	Rednex	"Cotton Eye Joe"	Internal Affairs	14 January 1995	3
716	Celine Dion	"Think Twice"	Epic	4 February 1995	7
717	Cher, Chrissie Hynde and Neneh Cherry with Eric Clapton	"Love Can Build a Bridge"	London	25 March 1995	1
718	The Outhere Brothers	"Don't Stop (Wiggle Wiggle)"	Eternal	1 April 1995	1
719	Take That	"Back for Good"	RCA	8 April 1995	4
720	Oasis	"Some Might Say"	Creation	6 May 1995	1
721	Livin' Joy	"Dreamer"	Undiscovered	13 May 1995	1
722	Robson & Jerome	"Unchained Melody" / "White Cliffs of Dover" †	RCA	20 May 1995	7
723	The Outhere Brothers	"Boom Boom Boom"	Eternal	8 July 1995	4
724	Take That	"Never Forget"	RCA	5 August 1995	3
725	Blur	"Country House"	Food	26 August 1995	2
726	Michael Jackson	"You Are Not Alone"	Epic	9 September 1995	2
727	Shaggy	"Boombastic"	Virgin	23 September 1995	1
728	Simply Red	"Fairground"	East West	30 September 1995	4
729	Coolio featuring L.V.	"Gangsta's Paradise"	Tommy Boy	28 October 1995	2
730	Robson & Jerome	"I Believe" / "Up on the Roof"	RCA	11 November 1995	4
731	Michael Jackson	"Earth Song"	Epic	9 December 1995	6
1996
732	George Michael	"Jesus to a Child"	Virgin	20 January 1996	1
733	Babylon Zoo	"Spaceman"	EMI	27 January 1996	5
734	Oasis	"Don't Look Back in Anger"	Creation	2 March 1996	1
735	Take That	"How Deep Is Your Love"	RCA	9 March 1996	3
736	The Prodigy	"Firestarter"	XL	30 March 1996	3
737	Mark Morrison	"Return of the Mack"	WEA	20 April 1996	2
738	George Michael	"Fastlove"	Virgin	4 May 1996	3
739	Gina G	"Ooh Aah... Just a Little Bit"	Eternal	25 May 1996	1
740	Baddiel, Skinner and The Lightning Seeds	"Three Lions"	Epic	1 June 1996	1
741	Fugees	"Killing Me Softly" †	Columbia	8 June 1996	4
re	Baddiel, Skinner and The Lightning Seeds	"Three Lions"	Epic	6 July 1996	1
re	Fugees	"Killing Me Softly" †	Columbia	13 July 1996	1
742	Gary Barlow	"Forever Love"	RCA	20 July 1996	1
743	Spice Girls	"Wannabe"	Virgin	27 July 1996	7
744	Peter Andre	"Flava"	Mushroom	14 September 1996	1
745	Fugees	"Ready or Not"	Columbia	21 September 1996	2
746	Deep Blue Something	"Breakfast at Tiffany's"	Interscope	5 October 1996	1
747	The Chemical Brothers	"Setting Sun"	Virgin	12 October 1996	1
748	Boyzone	"Words"	Polydor	19 October 1996	1
749	Spice Girls	"Say You'll Be There"	Virgin	26 October 1996	2
750	Robson & Jerome	"What Becomes of the Brokenhearted" / "Saturday Night at the Movies" / "You'll Never Walk Alone"	RCA	9 November 1996	2
751	The Prodigy	"Breathe"	XL	23 November 1996	2
752	Peter Andre	"I Feel You"	Mushroom	7 December 1996	1
753	Boyzone	"A Different Beat"	Polydor	14 December 1996	1
754	Dunblane	"Knockin' on Heaven's Door" / "Throw These Guns Away"	RCA	21 December 1996	1
755	Spice Girls	"2 Become 1"	Virgin	28 December 1996	3
1997
756	Tori Amos	"Professional Widow (It's Got to Be Big)"	East West	18 January 1997	1
757	White Town	"Your Woman"	Chrysalis	25 January 1997	1
758	Blur	"Beetlebum"	Food	1 February 1997	1
759	LL Cool J	"Ain't Nobody"	Geffen	8 February 1997	1
760	U2	"Discothèque"	Island	15 February 1997	1
761	No Doubt	"Don't Speak"	Interscope	22 February 1997	3
762	Spice Girls	"Mama" / "Who Do You Think You Are"	Virgin	15 March 1997	3
763	The Chemical Brothers	"Block Rockin' Beats"	Virgin	5 April 1997	1
764	R. Kelly	"I Believe I Can Fly"	Jive	12 April 1997	3
765	Michael Jackson	"Blood on the Dance Floor"	Epic	3 May 1997	1
766	Gary Barlow	"Love Won't Wait"	RCA	10 May 1997	1
767	Olive	"You're Not Alone"	RCA	17 May 1997	2
768	Eternal featuring BeBe Winans	"I Wanna Be the Only One"	EMI	31 May 1997	1
769	Hanson	"MMMBop"	Mercury	7 June 1997	3
770	Puff Daddy and Faith Evans featuring 112	"I'll Be Missing You"	Puff Daddy	28 June 1997	3
771	Oasis	"D'You Know What I Mean?"	Creation	19 July 1997	1
re	Puff Daddy and Faith Evans featuring 112	"I'll Be Missing You"	Puff Daddy	26 July 1997	3
772	Will Smith	"Men in Black"	Columbia	16 August 1997	4
773	The Verve	"The Drugs Don't Work"	Hut	13 September 1997	1
774	Elton John	"Candle in the Wind 1997" / "Something About the Way You Look Tonight" ‡	Rocket	20 September 1997	5
775	Spice Girls	"Spice Up Your Life"	Virgin	25 October 1997	1
776	Aqua	"Barbie Girl"	Universal	1 November 1997	4
777	Various artists	"Perfect Day"	Chrysalis	29 November 1997	2
778	Teletubbies	"Teletubbies say "Eh-oh!""	BBC Worldwide	13 December 1997	2
779	Spice Girls	"Too Much"	Virgin	27 December 1997	2
1998
re	Various artists	"Perfect Day"	Chrysalis	10 January 1998	1
780	All Saints	"Never Ever"	London	17 January 1998	1
781	Oasis	"All Around the World"	Creation	24 January 1998	1
782	Usher	"You Make Me Wanna..."	LaFace	31 January 1998	1
783	Aqua	"Doctor Jones"	Universal	7 February 1998	2
784	Celine Dion	"My Heart Will Go On"	Epic	21 February 1998	1
785	Cornershop	"Brimful of Asha"	Wiiija	28 February 1998	1
786	Madonna	"Frozen"	Maverick	7 March 1998	1
re	Celine Dion	"My Heart Will Go On"	Epic	14 March 1998	1
787	Run-DMC vs. Jason Nevins	"It's Like That"	Profile	21 March 1998	6
788	Boyzone	"All That I Need"	Polydor	2 May 1998	1
789	All Saints	"Under the Bridge" / "Lady Marmalade"	London	9 May 1998	1
790	Aqua	"Turn Back Time"	Universal	16 May 1998	1
re	All Saints	"Under the Bridge" / "Lady Marmalade"	London	23 May 1998	1
791	The Tamperer featuring Maya	"Feel It"	Pepper	30 May 1998	1
792	B*Witched	"C'est la Vie"	Epic	6 June 1998	2
793	Baddiel, Skinner and The Lightning Seeds	"3 Lions '98"	Epic	20 June 1998	3
794	Billie	"Because We Want To"	Innocent	11 July 1998	1
795	Another Level	"Freak Me"	Northwestside	18 July 1998	1
796	Jamiroquai	"Deeper Underground"	Sony S2	25 July 1998	1
797	Spice Girls	"Viva Forever"	Virgin	1 August 1998	2
798	Boyzone	"No Matter What"	Polydor	15 August 1998	3
799	Manic Street Preachers	"If You Tolerate This Your Children Will Be Next"	Epic	5 September 1998	1
800	All Saints	"Bootie Call"	London	12 September 1998	1
801	Robbie Williams	"Millennium"	Chrysalis	19 September 1998	1
802	Melanie B featuring Missy Elliott	"I Want You Back"	Virgin	26 September 1998	1
803	B*Witched	"Rollercoaster"	Epic	3 October 1998	2
804	Billie	"Girlfriend"	Innocent	17 October 1998	1
805	Spacedust	"Gym and Tonic"	East West	24 October 1998	1
806	Cher	"Believe" †	WEA	31 October 1998	7
807	B*Witched	"To You I Belong"	Epic	19 December 1998	1
808	Spice Girls	"Goodbye"	Virgin	26 December 1998	1
1999
809	Chef	"Chocolate Salty Balls (P.S. I Love You)"	Columbia	2 January 1999	1
810	Steps	"Heartbeat" / "Tragedy"	Jive	9 January 1999	1
811	Fatboy Slim	"Praise You"	Skint	16 January 1999	1
812	911	"A Little Bit More"	Virgin	23 January 1999	1
813	The Offspring	"Pretty Fly (for a White Guy)"	Columbia	30 January 1999	1
814	Armand van Helden featuring Duane Harden	"You Don't Know Me"	ffrr	6 February 1999	1
815	Blondie	"Maria"	Beyond Music	13 February 1999	1
816	Lenny Kravitz	"Fly Away"	Virgin	20 February 1999	1
817	Britney Spears	"...Baby One More Time" †	Jive	27 February 1999	2
818	Boyzone	"When the Going Gets Tough"	Polydor	13 March 1999	2
819	B*Witched	"Blame It on the Weatherman"	Epic	27 March 1999	1
820	Mr. Oizo	"Flat Beat"	F Communications	3 April 1999	2
821	Martine McCutcheon	"Perfect Moment"	Innocent	17 April 1999	2
822	Westlife	"Swear It Again"	RCA	1 May 1999	2
823	Backstreet Boys	"I Want It That Way"	Jive	15 May 1999	1
824	Boyzone	"You Needed Me"	Polydor	22 May 1999	1
825	Shanks & Bigfoot	"Sweet like Chocolate"	Pepper	29 May 1999	2
826	Baz Luhrmann	"Everybody's Free (To Wear Sunscreen)"	EMI	12 June 1999	1
827	S Club 7	"Bring It All Back"	Polydor	19 June 1999	1
828	Vengaboys	"Boom, Boom, Boom, Boom!!"	Positiva	26 June 1999	1
829	ATB	"9 PM (Till I Come)"	Ministry of Sound	3 July 1999	2
830	Ricky Martin	"Livin' la Vida Loca"	Columbia	17 July 1999	3
831	Ronan Keating	"When You Say Nothing at All"	Polydor	7 August 1999	2
832	Westlife	"If I Let You Go"	RCA	21 August 1999	1
833	Geri Halliwell	"Mi Chico Latino"	EMI	28 August 1999	1
834	Lou Bega	"Mambo No. 5 (A Little Bit Of...)"	RCA	4 September 1999	2
835	Vengaboys	"We're Going to Ibiza!"	Positiva	18 September 1999	1
836	Eiffel 65	"Blue (Da Ba Dee)"	Eternal	25 September 1999	3
837	Christina Aguilera	"Genie in a Bottle"	RCA	16 October 1999	2
838	Westlife	"Flying Without Wings"	RCA	30 October 1999	1
839	Five	"Keep on Movin'"	RCA	6 November 1999	1
840	Geri Halliwell	"Lift Me Up"	EMI	13 November 1999	1
841	Robbie Williams	"She's the One" / "It's Only Us"	Chrysalis	20 November 1999	1
842	Wamdue Project	"King of My Castle"	AM:PM	27 November 1999	1
843	Cliff Richard	"The Millennium Prayer"	EMI	4 December 1999	3
844	Westlife	"I Have a Dream" / "Seasons in the Sun"	RCA	25 December 1999	4

=== Artists by total number of weeks at number one ===
Artist	Weeks at number one
Spice Girls	21
Take That	21
Wet Wet Wet	19
Bryan Adams	16
Cher	13
Robson & Jerome	13
Elton John	12
Michael Jackson	11
Whitney Houston	10
Queen	9
Celine Dion	9
George Michael	9
Boyzone	9
Snap!	8
Shakespears Sister	8
Westlife	8
Aqua	7
Meat Loaf	7
B*Witched	6
Run–D.M.C.	6
Jason Nevins	6

=== Songs by total number weeks at number one ===
The following songs spent at least six weeks at number one during the 1990s.

Artist	Song	Weeks at number one
Bryan Adams	"(Everything I Do) I Do It for You"	16
Wet Wet Wet	"Love Is All Around"	15
Whitney Houston	"I Will Always Love You"	10
Shakespears Sister	"Stay"	8
Meat Loaf	"I'd Do Anything for Love (But I Won't Do That)	7
Celine Dion	"Think Twice"	7
Robson & Jerome	"Unchained Melody" / "(There'll Be Bluebirds Over) The White Cliffs of Dover"	7
Spice Girls	"Wannabe"	7
Cher	"Believe"	7
Snap!	"Rhythm Is a Dancer"	6
Michael Jackson	"Earth Song"	6
Puff Daddy & Faith Evans featuring 112	"I'll Be Missing You"	6
Run-DMC vs. Jason Nevins	"It's Like That"	6

== By artist ==
The following artists achieved three or more number-one hits during the 1990s. George Michael's collaborations with Elton John and Queen, in which both acts received billing on the single's cover, are counted for both acts. Appearances on the "Perfect Day" single are not included, as the individuals did not receive individual credit on the cover.

Artist	Number ones
Spice Girls	8
Take That	8
Boyzone	6^{[A]}
B*Witched	4
Michael Jackson	4
George Michael	4
Oasis	4
Westlife	4
All Saints	3
Aqua	3
Cher	3
Elton John	3^{[A]}
Queen	3
Robson & Jerome	3

- A. Total does not include an appearance on the "Perfect Day" single.

== By record label ==
The following record labels had five or more number ones on the UK singles chart during the 1990s.

Record label	Number ones
RCA	22
Virgin/Virgin International	19
Epic	17
Polydor	10
Columbia/CBS	9
EMI	9
London	9
Chrysalis	5
Jive	5

== Million-selling and platinum records ==
In April 1973, the British Phonographic Industry (BPI) began classifying singles and albums by the number of units sold. In the 1990s the highest threshold was "platinum record" and was awarded to singles that sold over 600,000 units. (Note: The number of sales required to qualify for Platinum, Gold and Silver discs was dropped in 1989 from the former thresholds of Silver (250,000 units), Gold (500,000 units), and Platinum (1,000,000 units) to the current thresholds of Silver (200,000 units), Gold (400,000 units), and Platinum (600,000 units)) In February 1987, the BPI introduced multi-platinum awards so if a single sold 1,200,000 units it was classified as 2×platinum, 1,800,000 units as 3×platinum, and so on.

Sixty-six records, including forty-seven number ones, were classified platinum in the 1990s and three other songs released in the 1990s were classified as platinum in the subsequent decade. Thirty records from the decade sold over one million units. Fourteen of these also went multi-platinum and "Candle in the Wind 1997" went nine times platinum and became the best-selling single of all time. "Angels" by Robbie Williams, "Torn" by Natalie Imbruglia, and "Wonderwall" by Oasis all sold over one million copies but failed to get to number one.

Artist	Song	Date released	Date certified platinum	Year of millionth sale (Multi-platinum)
Sinéad O'Connor	"Nothing Compares 2 U"	8 January 1990	1 March 1990	—
Band Aid II	"Do They Know It's Christmas?"	11 December 1989	1 April 1990	—
Elton John	"Sacrifice"	1 May 1990	1 September 1990	—
The Righteous Brothers	"Unchained Melody"	15 October 1990	1 November 1990	2004–10
Vanilla Ice	"Ice Ice Baby"	29 October 1990	1 January 1991	—
Bryan Adams	"(Everything I Do) I Do It for You"	17 June 1991	1 August 1991	1991, (2×: 1 September 1991)
Queen	"Bohemian Rhapsody" / "These Are the Days of Our Lives"	9 December 1991	1 December 1991	—
Whitney Houston	"I Will Always Love You"	31 October 1992	1 December 1992	1993, (2×: 1 January 1993)
Charles & Eddie	"Would I Lie to You?"	12 October 1992	1 January 1993	—
Ace of Base	"All That She Wants"	1 May 1993	1 June 1993	—
UB40	"(I Can't Help) Falling in Love With You"	10 May 1993	1 July 1993	—
Meat Loaf	"I'd Do Anything for Love (But I Won't Do That)"	27 September 1993	1 November 1993	—
Mr Blobby	"Mr Blobby"	22 November 1993	1 December 1993	—
Take That	"Babe"	6 December 1993	1 January 1994	—
Wet Wet Wet	"Love Is All Around"	4 May 1994	1 June 1994	1994, (2×: 1 August 1994)
Whigfield	"Saturday Night"	12 September 1994	1 September 1994	1994
All-4-One	"I Swear"^{[No 2]}	6 June 1994	1 September 1994	—
Pato Banton	"Baby Come Back"	19 September 1994	1 November 1994	—
East 17	"Stay Another Day"	21 November 1994	1 December 1994	—
Céline Dion	"Think Twice"	10 October 1994	1 January 1995	1994
Rednex	"Cotton Eye Joe"	12 December 1994	1 February 1995	—
Take That	"Back for Good"	27 March 1995	1 April 1995	2007–2010
Robson Green & Jerome Flynn	"Unchained Melody" / "White Cliffs of Dover"	21 November 1994	8 May 1995	1995, (2×: 1 May 1995)
Robson & Jerome	"I Believe" / "Up on the Roof"	30 October 1995	1 November 1995	1995
Coolio ft. L.V.	"Gangsta's Paradise"	16 October 1995	1 November 1995	1995
Simply Red	"Fairground"	18 September 1995	1 November 1995	—
Michael Jackson	"Earth Song"	27 November 1995	1 December 1995	1996
Babylon Zoo	"Spaceman"	15 January 1996	1 January 1996	1996
Oasis	"Wonderwall"^{[No 2]}	30 October 1995	1 January 1996	2007
Everything but the Girl	"Missing"^{[No 3]}	6 October 1995	1 January 1996	—
Boyzone	"Father and Son"^{[No 2]}	13 November 1995	1 January 1996	—
Take That	"How Deep Is Your Love"	26 February 1996	1 March 1996	—
Oasis	"Don't Look Back in Anger"	19 February 1996	1 April 1996	—
Robert Miles	"Children"^{[No 2]}	12 February 1996	1 April 1996	—
Mark Morrison	"Return of the Mack"	4 March 1996	1 May 1996	—
Gina G	"Ooh Aah... Just a Little Bit"	25 March 1996	1 May 1996	—
Baddiel, Skinner & The Lightning Seeds	"Three Lions"	1 June 1996	1 July 1996	—
Fugees	"Killing Me Softly	3 June 1996	1 June 1996	1996, (2×: 1 August 1996)
Spice Girls	"Wannabe"	15 July 1996	1 August 1996	1996
Spice Girls	"Say You'll Be There"	14 October 1996	1 October 1996	—
Various Artists	"Knockin' on Heaven's Door"	9 December 1996	1 December 1996	—
Spice Girls	"2 Become 1"	16 December 1996	1 December 1996	1997
Robson & Jerome	"What Becomes of the Brokenhearted"	28 October 1996	1 January 1997	—
Toni Braxton	"Un-Break My Heart"^{[No 2]}	21 October 1996	1 January 1997	—
The Prodigy	"Breathe"	11 November 1996	1 December 1996	—
Spice Girls	"Mama" / "Who Do You Think You Are"	3 March 1997	1 March 1997	—
Hanson	"MMMBop"	26 May 1997	1 June 1997	—
R. Kelly	"I Believe I Can Fly"	17 March 1997	1 June 1997	—
Oasis	"D'You Know What I Mean?"	7 July 1997	1 July 1997	—
The Rembrandts	"I'll Be There for You"^{[No 3]}	21 August 1995	1 July 1997	—
Will Smith	"Men in Black"	4 August 1997	1 August 1997	—
Puff Daddy ft. Faith Evans	"I'll Be Missing You"	16 June 1997	1 July 1997	1997, (2×: 1 August 1997)
Elton John	"Candle in the Wind 1997" / "Something About the Way You Look Tonight"	13 September 1997	1 September 1997	1997, (2–6×: 1 September 1997) (7–9×: 1 October 1997)
Chumbawamba	"Tubthumping"^{[No 2]}	11 August 1997	1 October 1997	—
Spice Girls	"Spice Up Your Life"	13 October 1997	17 October 1997	—
Various Artists	"Perfect Day"	17 November 1997	21 November 1997	1997, (2×: 9 January 1998)
Aqua	"Barbie Girl"	1 October 1997	7 November 1997	1997, (2×: 5 December 1997)
All Saints	"Never Ever"	10 November 1997	5 December 1997	1998, (2×: 30 January 1998)
Natalie Imbruglia	"Torn"^{[No 2]}	27 October 1997	12 December 1997	2007
Teletubbies	"Teletubbies say "Eh-oh!""	1 December 1997	12 December 1997	1997, (2×: 19 December 1997)
Spice Girls	"Too Much"	12 December 1997	9 January 1998	—
Janet Jackson	"Together Again"^{[No 4]}	1 December 1997	23 January 1998	—
Run-DMC vs. Jason Nevins	"It's Like That"	9 March 1998	27 March 1998	1998
Celine Dion	"My Heart Will Go On"	9 February 1998	27 February 1998	1998, (2×: 24 April 1998)
Savage Garden	"Truly Madly Deeply"^{[No 4]}	16 February 1998	29 May 1998	—
Baddiel, Skinner & The Lightning Seeds	"3 Lions '98"	1 June 1998	3 July 1998	—
B*Witched	"C'est la Vie"	1 June 1998	3 July 1998	—
LeAnn Rimes	"How Do I Live"^{[No 7]}	2 March 1998	17 July 1998	—
Boyzone	"No Matter What"	3 August 1998	7 August 1998	1998
Spice Girls	"Viva Forever"	20 July 1998	13 August 1998	—
Pras Michel ft. Ol' Dirty Bastard & Mýa	"Ghetto Supastar (That Is What You Are)"^{[No 2]}	6 June 1998	21 August 1998	—
Cher	"Believe"	19 October 1998	30 October 1998	1998, (2×: 8 January 1999) (3×: 1 August 2014)
Stardust	"Music Sounds Better with You"^{[No 2]}	10 August 1998	6 November 1998	—
Robbie Williams	"Angels"^{[No 4]}	1 December 1997	6 February 1998	1998, (2×: 4 December 1998)
Spice Girls	"Goodbye"	14 December 1998	18 December 1998	—
Steps	"Heartbeat" / "Tragedy"	9 November 1998	8 January 1999	1999
Bryan Adams ft. Melanie C	"When You're Gone"^{[No 3]}	30 November 1998	12 February 1999	—
Chef	"Chocolate Salty Balls"	14 December 1998	26 February 1999	—
Boyzone	"When the Going Gets Tough"	1 March 1999	19 March 1999	—
Britney Spears	"Baby One More Time"	15 February 1999	19 February 1999	1999, (2×: 26 March 1999)
Mr. Oizo	"Flat Beat"	22 March 1999	1 April 1999	—
Martine McCutcheon	"Perfect Moment"	5 April 1999	14 May 1999	—
Shanks & Bigfoot	"Sweet like Chocolate"	17 May 1999	4 June 1999	—
Shania Twain	"That Don't Impress Me Much"^{[No 3]}	10 May 1999	16 July 1999	—
TLC	"No Scrubs"^{[No 3]}	14 December 1998	18 December 1998	—
ATB	"9pm (Till I Come)"	21 June 1999	23 July 1999	—
S Club 7	"Bring It All Back"	7 June 1999	30 July 1999	—
Ricky Martin	"Livin' la Vida Loca"	1 July 1999	13 August 1999	—
Lou Bega	"Mambo No.5 (A Little Bit Of...)"	1 August 1999	17 September 1999	—
Eiffel 65	"Blue (Da Ba Dee)"	13 September 1999	8 October 1999	1999
Cliff Richard	"The Millennium Prayer"	15 November 1999	3 December 1999	—
Westlife	"I Have a Dream" / "Seasons in the Sun"	13 December 1999	23 December 1999	—
R. Kelly	"If I Could Turn Back the Hands of Time"^{[No 2]}	18 October 1999	14 January 2000	—
Artful Dodger	"Re-Rewind"^{[No 2]}	29 November 1999	3 March 2000	—
Alice DeeJay	"Better off Alone"^{[No 2]}	19 July 1999	19 May 2000	—

=== Additional information ===
- ^{[No 2]}: The singles "I Swear", "Wonderwall", "Father and Son", "Children", "Un-Break My Heart", "Tubthumping", "Torn", "Ghetto Superstar", "Music Sounds Better with You", "If I Could Turn Back the Hands of Time", and "Better Off Alone" peaked at number two in the UK singles chart.
- ^{[No 3]}: The singles "I'll Be There for You", "Missing", "When You're Gone", "That Don't Impress Me Much", and "No Scrubs" peaked at number three in the UK singles chart.
- ^{[No 4]}: The singles "Together Again", "Truly Madly Deeply", and "Angels" peaked at number four in the UK singles chart.
- ^{[No 7]}: The single "How Do I Live" peaked at number seven in the UK cingles chart.
