= Wrong Cops (Best Of) =

2014 album by Mr. Oizo

Greatest hits album by Mr. Oizo
- Released: 24 February 2014
- Recorded: 2005–2013
- Genre: Electronic, avant-garde, French house
- Length: 59 minutes (approx.)
- Label: Ed Banger Records
- Producer: Quentin Dupieux

Mr. Oizo chronology
Amicalement (2013)	Wrong Cops (Best Of) (2014)	The Church (2014)

Professional ratings
Review scores
Source	Rating
Clash	6/10

Wrong Cops (Best Of) is a compilation album by Mr. Oizo, released by Ed Banger Records on 24 February 2014. It is a mix of songs from studio albums, extended plays, B-sides, soundtracks Mr. Oizo has co-produced and some unreleased material. The compilation features guest appearances and collaborations from other artists, such as Marilyn Manson, Gaspard Augé of Justice and Sébastien Tellier.

Despite being a best-of compilation, Dupieux' most famous work, "Flat Beat", was not featured.

== Track listing ==
No.	Title	Length
1.	"Copening Redits"	1:20
2.	"WC (Stade 3)"	2:31
3.	"Cut Dick (Lambs Anger)"	2:51
4.	"Flip Bat (Unfinished Unreleased Unpleasant)"	3:09
5.	"Transexual (Transexual / Patrick122)"	4:08
6.	"Textes (Stade 3)"	2:52
7.	"Z (Lambs Anger)"	4:13
8.	"Jo (Lambs Anger)"	2:18
9.	"Solid (featuring Marilyn Manson) (Amicalement (EP))"	3:32
10.	"Crows & Guts (co-produced by Gaspard Augé) (Rubber)"	2:28
11.	"Bellyball Road (co-produced by Gaspard Augé) (Rubber)"	1:07
12.	"Camelfuck (Stade 2)"	2:47
13.	"Positif (Lambs Anger)"	2:51
14.	"Druide (Stade 2)"	3:08
15.	"France7 (Stade 2)"	3:40
16.	"Stunt (co-produced by Sébastien Tellier) (Moustache (Half a Scissor))"	3:20
17.	"Polocaust (co-produced by Gaspard Augé) (Rubber)"	1:20
18.	"Peehurts (Stade 3)"	3:31
19.	"De Luca (formerly unreleased)"	2:52
20.	"Lars Von Sen (X-Mas Remix) (B-side of Pourriture, a single from Lambs Anger, released in 2008)"	3:09
21.	"The End (Moustache (Half a Scissor))"	1:57
