= List of instrumental number ones on the UK singles chart =

The UK Singles Chart is a record chart compiled on behalf of the British record industry. Since 1997, the chart has been compiled by the Official Charts Company (formerly The Official UK Charts Company and the Chart Information Network) and until 2005 (when digital downloads were included in the chart compilation), the chart was based entirely on sales of physical singles from retail outlets. The UK Singles Chart originated in 1952, when New Musical Express (NME) published the first chart of singles sales. The positions of all songs are based on week-end sale totals, from Sunday to Saturday, but pre-1987 the charts were released on a Tuesday because of the need for manual calculation.

Since inception there have been more than 1,400 number ones; of these, instrumental tracks have topped the chart on 30 occasions for a total of 96 weeks. (Note: The track "Hoots Mon" is not fully instrumental but is classified nominally as an instrumental track and described as being accompanied by "some Scottish-sounding grunts and interjections at the end of each chorus".) The Shadows have had the most instrumental number ones, with five between 1960 and 1963. Three other artists have had more than one instrumental number one: Eddie Calvert (in 1954 and 1955), Winifred Atwell (in 1954 and 1956) and Russ Conway (both in 1959). Calvert's track "O Mein Papa" stayed at the top of the charts for nine weeks, longer than any other instrumental single. The single "Cherry Pink (and Apple Blossom White)" has been an instrumental number one for two different artists (Calvert and Perez Prado) in 1955. To date, Martin Garrix is the most recent artist to have an instrumental number one, with "Animals" in November 2013.

== Number ones ==
Artist	Single	Record label (Note: The record labels are those given by the OCC.)	Week ending date (Note: The date and duration at number-one are referenced by the following: 1950s: "Number 1 Singles – 1950s". The Official UK Charts Company. Archived from the original on 30 April 2008.; 1960s: "All the Number One Singles – 1960s". Official Charts Company. Archived from the original on 9 August 2011.; 1970s: "All the Number One Singles – 1970s". Official Charts Company. Archived from the original on 17 February 2011.; 1990s: "All the Number One Singles – 1990s". Official Charts Company. Archived from the original on 9 June 2010.)	Weeks at number one	Reference
Mantovani	"The Song from Moulin Rouge"	Decca	14 August 1953	1	
Eddie Calvert	"O Mein Papa"	Columbia	8 January 1954	9	
Winifred Atwell	"Let's Have Another Party"	Philips	3 December 1954	5	
Perez Prado	"Cherry Pink (and Apple Blossom White)"	His Master's Voice	29 April 1955	2	
Eddie Calvert	"Cherry Pink (and Apple Blossom White)"	Columbia	27 May 1955	4	
Winifred Atwell	"Poor People of Paris"	Philips	13 April 1956	3	
Lord Rockingham's XI	"Hoots Mon"	Decca	28 November 1958	3	
Russ Conway	"Side Saddle"	Columbia	27 March 1959	4	
Russ Conway	"Roulette"	Columbia	19 June 1959	2	
The Shadows	"Apache"	Columbia	25 August 1960	5	
Floyd Cramer	"On the Rebound"	RCA	18 May 1961	1	
The Shadows	"Kon-Tiki"	Columbia	5 October 1961	1	
The Shadows	"Wonderful Land"	Columbia	22 March 1962	8	
B. Bumble and the Stingers	"Nut Rocker"	Top Rank	17 May 1962	2	
The Tornados	"Telstar"	Decca	4 October 1962	5	
The Shadows	"Dance On!"	Columbia	24 January 1963	1	
Jet Harris and Tony Meehan	"Diamonds"	Decca	31 January 1963	3	
The Shadows	"Foot Tapper"	Columbia	29 March 1963	1	
Hugo Montenegro	"The Good, the Bad and the Ugly"	RCA	13 November 1968	4	
Fleetwood Mac	"Albatross"	Blue Horizon	29 January 1969	1	
Royal Scots Dragoon Guards	"Amazing Grace"	RCA	15 April 1972	5	
Lieutenant Pigeon	"Mouldy Old Dough"	Decca	14 October 1972	4	
Simon Park Orchestra	"Eye Level"	Columbia	29 September 1973	4	
Doop	"Doop"	Clubstitute	19 March 1994	3	
The Chemical Brothers	"Block Rockin' Beats" (Note: The track "Block Rockin' Beats" is not fully instrumental but is classified nominally as an instrumental track, it features a sampled spoken line ("back with another one of those block-rocking beats"), however the rest of the track is entirely instrumental.)	Virgin	5 April 1997	1	
Mr. Oizo	"Flat Beat"	F Communications	3 April 1999	2	
ATB	"9 PM (Till I Come)"	Ministry of Sound	3 July 1999	2	
Crazy Frog	"Axel F"	Ministry of Sound	3 June 2005	4	
Mint Royale	"Singin' in the Rain"	Faith & Hope	14 June 2008	2	
Martin Garrix	"Animals"	Spinnin'	23 November 2013	1	
