= Here's Johnny =

Here's Johnny may refer to:

- "Here's Johnny" (song), a 1993 song by Dutch dance music duo Hocus Pocus
- "Here's Johnny", the catchphrase used by Ed McMahon for almost 30 years on The Tonight Show Starring Johnny Carson (1962–1992)
  - "Here's Johnny", catchphrase that was reused by Jack Nicholson in the 1980 film The Shining
  - "Here's Johnny", a song referencing the McMahon catchphrase by "Weird Al" Yankovic on his 1986 Polka Party! album
- Here's Johnny, a 2000 documentary film about John Hicklenton

== See also ==
- Now Here's Johnny Cash (1961), the tenth album by Johnny Cash
- "Who's Johnny", a 1986 single by El DeBarge
