= Unreasonable Behaviour =

Studio album by Laurent Garnier
- Released: 7 February 2000
- Genre: Electronic; techno
- Length: 69:03
- Label: F Communications
- Producer: Laurent Garnier

Laurent Garnier chronology
30 (1997)	Unreasonable Behaviour (2000)	The Cloud Making Machine (2005)

Singles from Unreasonable Behaviour
- 1. "The Sound of the Big Babou" Released: 1999; 2. "The Man with the Red Face" Released: 2000; 3. "Greed" Released: 2000

Unreasonable Behaviour is the third studio album by French DJ and record producer Laurent Garnier. It was released on 7 February 2000 through F Communications. It peaked at number 94 on the UK Albums Chart. It received universal acclaim from critics.

== Background ==
Unreasonable Behaviour is Laurent Garnier's third studio album, following Shot in the Dark (1994) and 30 (1997). It was created with assistance from Laurent Collat. It also features contributions from Philippe Nadaud, Daniel Bechet, and Delia.

The album was released on 7 February 2000 through F Communications. In the United States, it was released on 17 October 2000 through Mute Records. Three singles were released from the album: "The Sound of the Big Babou" (1999), "The Man with the Red Face" (2000), and "Greed" (2000).

A limited edition of the album comes with a bonus disc, Live at the Rex Club 01/06/00.

== Critical reception ==
Professional ratings
Aggregate scores
Source	Rating
Metacritic	83/100
Review scores
Source	Rating
AllMusic	4/5 stars
NME	7/10
Pitchfork	7.0/10
Q	2/5 stars
Rolling Stone	3.5/5 stars

According to the review aggregator Metacritic, Unreasonable Behaviour received "universal acclaim" based on a weighted average score of 83 out of 100 from 10 critic scores.

Kieran Wyatt of CMJ New Music Monthly wrote, "Unreasonable Behaviour is an album that smoothly connects the dots between techno, house and more angular electronica, rather than flipping erratically between styles." John Bush of AllMusic stated, "More complex and idiosyncratic than his previous full-length works (and much less danceable as a consequence), Unreasonable Behaviour focuses on midtempo jams in the verge between evocative techno, electro-jazz, and even melancholy synth-pop." He added, "He'd surely think twice before plugging any of these tracks into one of his DJ sets, but Unreasonable Behaviour is a solid fusion of jazz and techno."

Prasad Bidaye of Exclaim! commented that the album "conveys some of the ideas that you'd expect on a Derrick May or Carl Craig recording, sharing a strong affinity with the attitudes of Detroit artists, portraying a worldview through the language of underground dance music." Eamon P. Joyce of PopMatters called it "his most rigorous and highly-nuanced work to date." He added, "While Garnier is usually highly accessible, here he deviates in favor of a record much more tempestuous, menacing and genre-pushing — all of which, though foreboding, is wholly more gratifying."

=== Accolades ===
Accolades for Unreasonable Behaviour
Publication	Year	List	Rank	Ref.
Resident Advisor	2010	Top 100 Albums of the 2000s	76	

== Track listing ==
All tracks are written by Laurent Garnier.

Unreasonable Behaviour track listing
No.	Title	Length
1.	"The Warning"	1:38
2.	"City Sphere"	6:13
3.	"Forgotten Thoughts"	6:42
4.	"The Sound of the Big Babou"	7:19
5.	"Unreasonable Behaviour"	1:19
6.	"Cycles d'Oppositions"	5:01
7.	"The Man with the Red Face"	9:11
8.	"Communications from the Lab"	5:15
9.	"Greed"	6:45
10.	"Dangerous Drive"	8:49
11.	"Downfall"	5:36
12.	"Last Tribute from the 20th Century"	5:15
Total length:		69:03

Limited edition bonus disc: Live at the Rex Club 01/06/00
No.	Title	Length
1.	"Acid Eiffel"	6:53
2.	"Smart Move"	5:38
3.	"Madness"	3:19
4.	"Last Tribute from the 20th Century"	6:52
5.	"Communications from the Lab"	5:10
Total length:		27:52

== Personnel ==
Credits adapted from liner notes.

- Laurent Garnier – production, mixing
- Laurent Collat – sound design, mixing
- Philippe Nadaud – electronic wind instrument (7), saxophone (7), flute (12)
- Daniel Bechet – electronic percussion (9)
- Delia – vocals (12)
- Seb Jarnot – illustration, design

== Charts ==
Chart performance for Unreasonable Behaviour
Chart (2000)	Peak position
Belgian Albums (Ultratop Flanders)	11
French Albums (SNEP)	42
UK Albums (OCC)	94
