= Moustache (Half a Scissor) =

Studio album by Mr. Oizo
- Released: September 19, 2005
- Genres: Electro house; French house; experimental; glitch
- Length: 38:18
- Labels: F Communications; Brainfeeder
- Producers: Quentin Dupieux; Feadz

Mr. Oizo chronology
| Analog Worms Attack (1999) | Moustache (Half a Scissor) (2005) | Steak (2007) |

Professional ratings
Review scores
| Source | Rating |
|---|---|
| AllMusic | 3.5/5 stars |

Moustache (Half a Scissor) is the second full-length album by Mr. Oizo, the alias of electronic musician Quentin Dupieux, released on September 19, 2005 on F Communications.

The album was Dupieux's last release for F Communications, as Laurent Garnier strongly disliked the album and referred to it as "unlistenable". The album is characterized by uncommon time signatures, dissonant tones and unusual samples. He subsequently signed to the French label Ed Banger Records. The album was re-released by the American label Brainfeeder in 2011 on limited-edition vinyl.

== Influence ==
Justice member Xavier de Rosnay cited Moustache as an influence on the duo's music, stating: “This is total laptop music, and they were the first records exploring what you can really do with digital means”.

== Track listing ==
All tracks are written by Quentin Dupleux, except "Stunt", written by Quentin Dupleux and Sébastien Tellier.

| No. | Title | Length |
|---|---|---|
| 1. | "[untitled]" | 0:42 |
| 2. | "The End" | 1:58 |
| 3. | "Latex" | 3:06 |
| 4. | "Vagiclean 2" | 1:10 |
| 5. | "Straw Anxious" | 1:53 |
| 6. | "(e)" | 1:07 |
| 7. | "Nurse Bob" | 2:32 |
| 8. | "Berleef" | 2:46 |
| 9. | "Scum Hotel" | 1:43 |
| 10. | "Drop Urge Need Elle" | 3:16 |
| 11. | "(ee)" | 0:59 |
| 12. | "Stunt" | 3:18 |
| 13. | "Moustache" | 0:15 |
| 14. | "Half a Scissor" | 3:04 |
| 15. | "1$44" | 2:12 |
| 16. | "Square Surf" | 2:50 |
| 17. | "Vagiclean" | 5:27 |
| Total length: | | 38:18 |

Promo CD-R
| No. | Title | Length |
|---|---|---|
| 1. | "Nazis" | 4:19 |
| 2. | "The End" | 1:20 |
| 3. | "Moustache" | 0:15 |
| 4. | "A Nun" | 2:04 |
| 5. | "(e)" | 1:06 |
| 6. | "I Was A Straw And I Was Anxious" | 1:55 |
| 7. | "Berleef" | 2:44 |
| 8. | "CPU" | 2:09 |
| 9. | "Nurse Bob" | 1:35 |
| 10. | "Half a Scissor" | 3:26 |
| 11. | "(ee)" | 0:59 |
| 12. | "Stunt" | 3:41 |
| 13. | "Scum Hotel" | 1:42 |
| 14. | "Drop Urge Need Elle" | 4:48 |
| 15. | "1$44" | 2:07 |
| 16. | "Vagiclean" | 5:34 |
| Total length: | | 39:44 |
