= Analog Worms Attack =

Studio album by Mr. Oizo
- Released: 11 October 1999
- Genre: Instrumental hip-hop; experimental hip-hop; wonky; trip hop
- Length: 49:40
- Label: F Communications
- Producer: Quentin Dupieux

Mr. Oizo chronology
Analog Worms Attack (1999)	Moustache (Half a Scissor) (2005)

Singles from Analog Worms Attack
- 1. "Analog Worms Attack" Released: 1999; 2. "Flat Beat" Released: 22 March 1999; 3. "Last Night a DJ Killed My Dog" Released: January 2000

Analog Worms Attack is the debut studio album by French musician Quentin Dupieux under the pseudonym Mr. Oizo. It was released on 11 October 1999 through F Communications.

== Background ==
The album is mostly instrumental and minimal, taking cues from French house and early American hip-hop. All music was composed on mainly analogue synthesisers and equipment, most notably the Korg MS-20 analog synthesizer, as opposed to later works that would rely upon digital equipment and techniques.

The track "Last Night a DJ Killed My Dog" is a reference to Indeep's 1980's single "Last Night a D.J. Saved My Life". French producer and future Ed Banger Records labelmate Feadz provides most of the turntable work on the record.

== Release ==
Analog Worms Attack was originally released on 11 October 1999. In the United States, it was released on 22 February 2000 through Mute Records.

== Critical reception ==
Professional ratings
Review scores
Source	Rating
AllMusic	4/5 stars
NME	3.5/5 stars

The album received generally favourable reviews on release, and has become an influence in the electronic genre. AllMusic reviewer John Bush described the album as "a left-field treat for both pop-culture seekers and genuine music fans".

In 2009, Brandon Ivers of XLR8R stated, "Analog Worms Attack's overtly gritty production was the odd link between French house and a parallel-world, wonky version of instrumental hip-hop."

== Track listing ==
All tracks are written by Quentin Dupieux.

Analog Worms Attack track listing
No.	Title	Length
1.	"Bad Start"	1:46
2.	"Monophonic Shit"	3:56
3.	"No Day Massacre"	4:17
4.	"Smoking Tape"	1:31
5.	"Last Night a DJ Killed My Dog"	4:27
6.	"The Salad"	3:03
7.	"Bobby Can't Dance"	2:46
8.	"Analog Worms Attack"	4:52
9.	"One Minute Shakin"	1:13
10.	"Inside the Kidney Machine"	4:50
11.	"Miaaaw"	4:23
12.	"Flat 55"	2:22
13.	"Feadz On"	1:10
14.	"Analog Wormz Sequel"	3:40

CD edition bonus track
No.	Title	Length
15.	"Flat Beat"	5:17

== Personnel ==
Credits adapted from liner notes.

- Quentin Oizo Dupieux – production, mixing, worms drawings
- DJ Fabien Feadz Pianta – turntables
- Guillaume Dickvebraz – mixing
- Richard Reach Mvogo – logo, artwork

== Charts ==
Chart performance for Analog Worms Attack
Chart (2016)	Peak position
French Albums (SNEP)	56
German Albums (Offizielle Top 100)	90
