= Flat Eric =

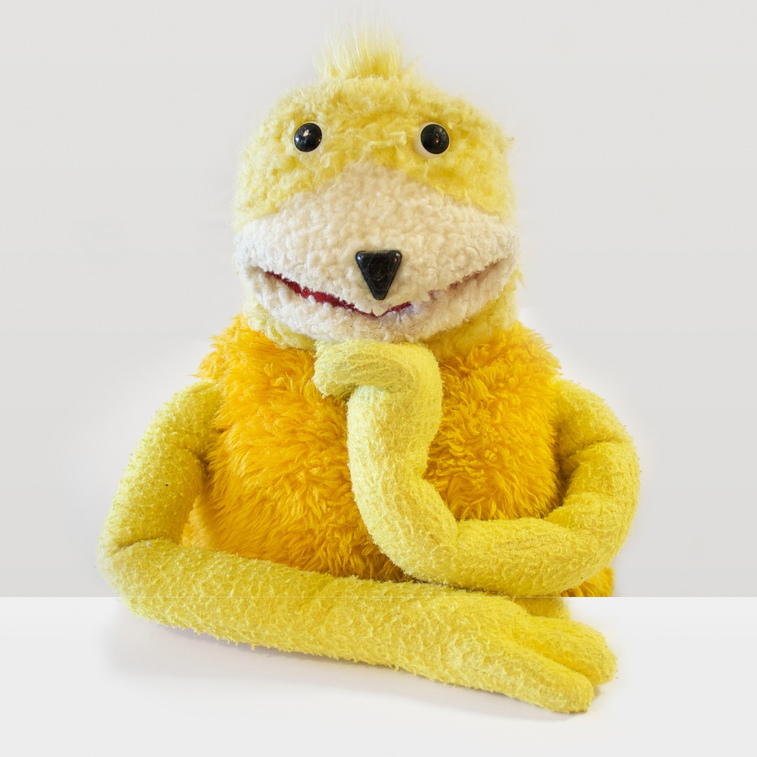
- First appearance: 1999
- Created by: Quentin Dupieux
- Designed by: Janet Knechtel
- Portrayed by: Drew Massey (Levi's commercials); Richard Coombs

Flat Eric is a puppet character, created by Quentin Dupieux (better known under his stage name Mr. Oizo), from Levi's commercials for Sta-Prest One Crease Denim Clothing, built by Jim Henson's Creature Shop. His name comes from an idea for a commercial that involved having a car run over his head and flattening it. The idea was not used, but the name stuck.

In the commercials, Flat Eric would ride with his friend Angel (played by Philippe Petit) around California, evading the police as a wanted criminal. As of 2025, Mr. Oizo still uses Flat Eric as a mascot.

== Background ==
Flat Eric was based on a dog-like monkey puppet called Stéphane that was similar, but with ears and the hands were fixed. Stéphane appeared in some short films by Mr. Oizo (including a video for the track M-Seq), and had a small cult following in the United Kingdom and France. In March 1999, Levi's decided to build a television commercial campaign around the puppet, to be directed by Oizo.

The character was renamed Eric, a more "international name", in contrast to the original French name Stéphane. The name Eric was chosen after Eric Morand, one of the founders of the record label F Communications.

He was made by Janet Knechtel for Jim Henson's Creature Shop, in the United Kingdom, and was performed by Drew Massey for all the Levi's commercials. The Levi's adverts took three days to shoot. The original short films made with Stéphane cost around 15,000 francs to produce. The two Levi's adverts cost around two or three million francs each. The rights to the character were retained by Oizo and production company Partizan.

== Characteristics ==
Eric typically does not speak, communicating only through body language. He has only spoken in the music video for "Flat Beat", doing so through electronic squawks reminiscent of Miss Othmar in the Peanuts animated specials. These squawks are similar to the ones Stéphane did in M-Seq.

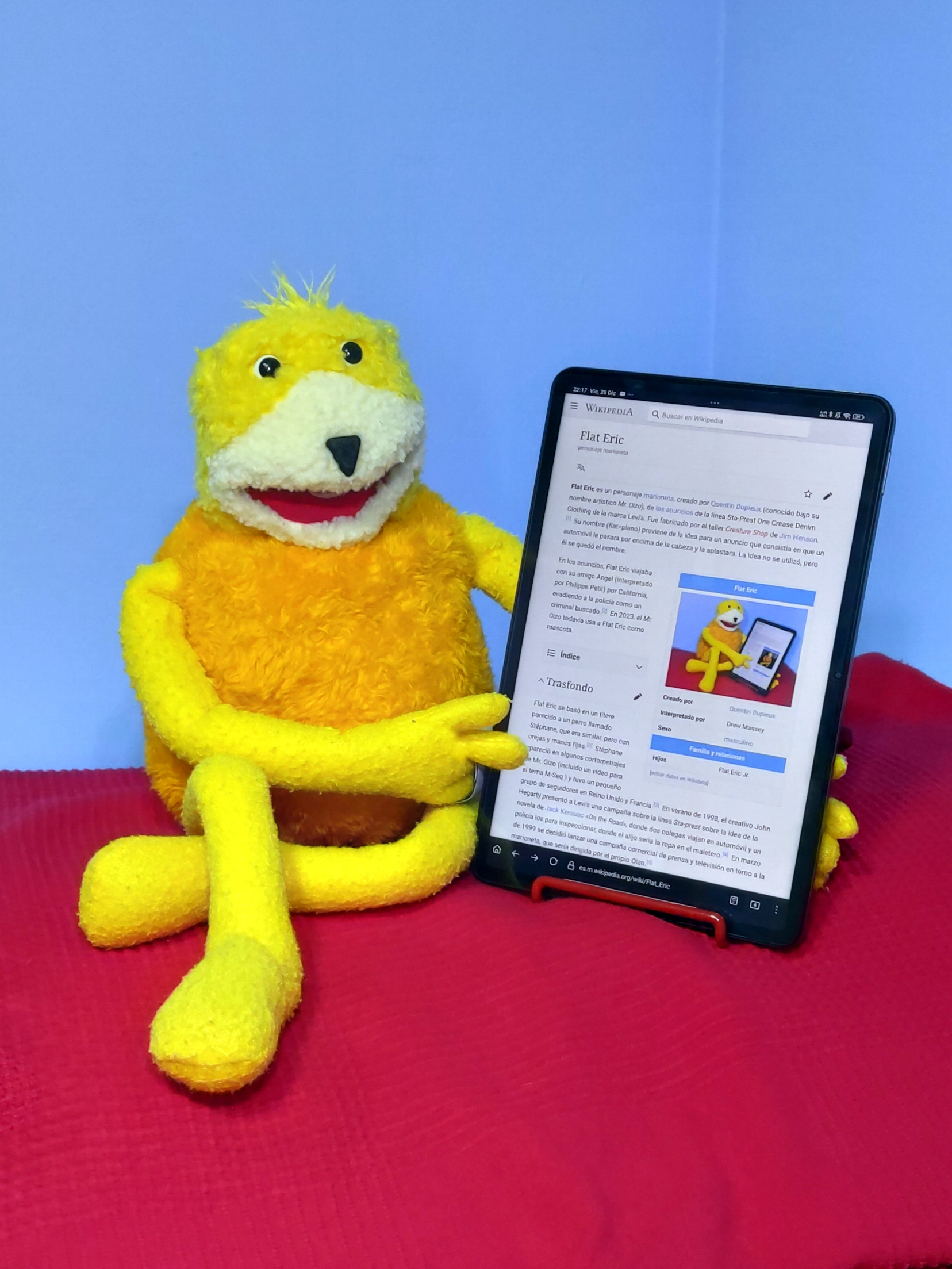
Flat Eric toy posed with a tablet

== Appearances ==
He was featured in the music videos for "Flat Beat" and "Viandes Légumes Véhicules" by French musician Mr. Oizo and he also appeared as a prop in Series 1 of the 2001 to 2003 BBC Comedy, The Office. In August 2004, he co-starred with David Soul, in a five-million-pound commercial for Auto Trader. He has also appeared on The Big Breakfast. The puppet also featured heavily as a prop for more than ten years on SIC Radical interactive chat show Curto Circuito, being usually named as "Boneco Amarelo" (Portuguese for "Yellow Puppet"). A Flat Eric stuffed toy appeared briefly in LFO, a film that makes heavy use of and nods to synthesizers.

Flat Eric has also been featured in many magazines, including Arena, Cosmopolitan, Heat, Melody Maker, Ministry, Mixmag, Muzik, NME and The Face.

Flat Eric was introduced as an unlockable character in the mobile game Crossy Road in a 2016 update, being free for a limited time.
