= Laurent Garnier =

- Laurent Garnier in 2026

Background information
- Also known as: Choice; DJ Pedro
- Born: 1 February 1966 (age 60); Boulogne-Billancourt, France
- Genres: Electronic, house
- Occupations: Disc jockey, record producer, composer
- Years active: 1987–present
- Labels: F Communications, Mute, Thirsty Ear, COD3 QR

Laurent Garnier (born 1 February 1966), also known as Choice, is a French electronic music producer and DJ. Garnier began DJing in Manchester during the late 1980s. He became a producer in the early 1990s and recorded several albums.

== Early influences ==
In 1984, Garnier started working as a waiter at the French Embassy in London. He started playing with DJ Nelson, a.k.a. DJ Stan, at a French club. He stayed there for a year and a half before moving to Manchester in 1986. Living in England he discovered the booming UK house scene and started DJing.

== Career ==
In 1987, he discovered The Haçienda in Manchester, and met Mike Pickering the resident DJ. Chicago house and Detroit techno became popular, and Garnier started mixing there under the name of DJ Pedro.

In 1988, he went back to France to fulfill his military obligations. He also spent some time in New York City where he met Frankie Knuckles. Garnier shifted his attention back to France in the early 1990s, running the Wake Up parties at the Rex Club in Paris for three years, and in Dijon from 1990 to 1994 at L'An-Fer while in 1992 he played a three-night long Weekender set at the Cork venue, Sir Henry's and an Ibiza Foam Party at The Red Box, Dublin. He also mixed in clubs such as Le Palace or Le Boy, DJing in rave parties and gradually moving into recording as well. For the FNAC label, Garnier released "French Connection" and the A Bout de Souffle EP. After that label went out of business, he formed the F Communications label with Eric Morand (a friend who had also worked for Fnac).

His first album, Shot in the Dark, was released in 1995. His second, 30, appeared in 1997 and included one of Garnier's best selling singles, "Crispy Bacon". 30 was followed by the retrospective Early Works. After appearing worldwide with DJ appearances during the late 1990s, Garnier returned to production with Unreasonable Behaviour, released in early 2000, which featured one of his best known songs, "The Man with the Red Face".

Following the release of 33 tours et puis s'en vont in 2023, Garnier maintained a significant presence on the international festival circuit. In 2026, he was announced as the headliner for the historic 30th anniversary of the Astropolis festival in Brest. Performing on the "La Cour" stage at the Manoir de Keroual, Garnier was billed for a special three-hour set, symbolizing his long-standing role as a pioneer of the French techno scene and his enduring relationship with the festival's three-decade history.

== Selected discography ==
=== Charted albums ===
Title	Year	Peak chart positions				
Title	Year	FR	BE	BE (V)	BE (W)	UK
Shot in the Dark	1994	—	—	—	—	87
30	1997	42	—	—	—	92
Early Works	1998	66	—	—	—	—
Unreasonable Behaviour	2000	42	11	—	—	94
My Excess Luggage	2003	139	—	—	—	—
The Cloud Making Machine	2005	73	—	—	—	—
Tales of a Kleptomaniac	2009	45	—	28	74	—
La Home Box	2015	98	—	98	111	—
33 tours et puis s'en vont	2023	—	—	—	41	—

=== Charted singles ===
Title	Year	Peak chart positions	
Title	Year	FR	UK
Astral Dreams (with F Communications)	1994	—	85
Crispy Bacon (with F Communications)	1997	—	60
Flashback (with F Communications)	1998	—	82
Coloured City (with F Communications)	2000	100	98
Mega Single: Techno	2003	95	—
The Sound of the Big Babou (with F Communications)	2003	—	92
Man with the Red Face (with F Communications)	2005	—	65
Gnanmankoudji	2009	99	—
Greed/The Man with the Red Face (with F Communications)	2009	—	36

=== Studio albums ===
- Shot in the Dark (1994), F Communications
- 30 (1997), F Communications/PIAS France
- Unreasonable Behaviour (2000), F Communications
- The Cloud Making Machine (2005), F Communications/PIAS
- Tales of a Kleptomaniac (2009), PIAS
- la HOME box (2015), F Communications
- De Película (2021), with The Limiñanas, Because Music
- 33 tours et puis s'en vont (2023), COD3 QR

=== Compilation albums ===
- Raw Works (US only compilation) (1996), Never Recordings
- Early Works (compilation) (1998), Arcade
- Retrospective (compilation) (2006), F Communications/PIAS (includes a track with Håkon Kornstad)

=== Live albums ===
- Public Outburst (2007), F Communications, live album with Bugge Wesseltoft, Philippe Nadaud, Benjamin Rippert

=== EPs ===
==== With Ed Banger records ====
- Timeless EP (2012)

==== With FNAC Music Dance Division ====
- As French Connection (1991), with Mix Master Doody
- Stronger by Design EP (1992)
- Paris EP (1993), with Shazz, as Choice (also published by Fragile Records)
- A bout de souffle EP (1993) (also published by Warp Records)
- Planet House EP (1993)

==== With F Communications ====
- Alliance EP (1994), with Pascal FEOS, as Dune
- Deuxième EP (1995), as Alaska
- Club Traxx EP (1995)
- Club Traxx EP Vol 2 (1998)

==== With Innervisions ====
- Back to My Roots EP (2008)

=== Singles ===
==== With FNAC Music Dance Division ====
- "Join Hands" (remixes) (1992)
- "Wake Up!" (1993) ("One year of music for house music lovers" – free to people who went to the first anniversary of the "Wake Up" club in Paris)
- "Lost in Alaska" (1993), with Nic Britton, as Alaska

==== With F Communications ====
- "Astral Dreams" (1994)
- "The Hoe" (1996)
- "Crispy Bacon Part 1" (1997) UK No. 60
- "Crispy Bacon Part 2" (1997)
- "Flashback" (1997)
- "Coloured City" (1998)
- "The Sound of the Big Babou" (1999)
- "The Man with the Red Face" (2000) UK No. 65
- "Greed" / "The Man with the Red Face" (2000) UK No. 36
- "Sambou" (2002)
- "Returning Back to Sirius" (2003), as Alaska
- "6 Months Earlier" (2004), with Ludovic Llorca, as Marl Chingus
- "The Cloud Making Machine" (reworks vol 1 & 2) (2005)

=== DVDs ===
- Greed DVD single – F Communications, Film Office, TDK Mediactive (2001)
- Live à l'Elysée Montmartre – F communications (2002)

=== Compilations and DJ sessions ===
- X-Mix – Destination Planet Dream (Studio !K7 – 1994)
- Mixmag Live Vol. 19 (1995)
- Laboratoire Mix (2xCD, React, 1996)
- Early Works (2xCD, 1998)
- Fashion TV: Spring – Summer 2001 Collection
- Classic And Rare : La Collection Chapter 3 (F Communications, 2002)
- Excess Luggage (3xCD, F Communications, 2003)
- The Kings of Techno (Rapster Records, 2006)
- Mixmag 25 Years Anniversary (2008)
