= All Wet (album) =

Studio album by Mr. Oizo
- Released: 30 September 2016
- Genres: Electronic, techno
- Length: 34:23
- Labels: Ed Banger; Because
- Producer: Quentin Dupieux

Mr. Oizo chronology
| The Church (2014) | All Wet (2016) | VOILÀ (2022) |

All Wet is the sixth studio album by French musician Mr. Oizo. The album was released on 30 September 2016 under Ed Banger Records.

== Track listing ==
All tracks composed by Quentin Dupieux except where noted.

| No. | Title | Writer(s) | Composer(s) | Length |
|---|---|---|---|---|
| 1. | "Ok Then" | Quentin Dupieux | | 2:02 |
| 2. | "Sea Horses" (featuring Tetanos) | Dupieux; Franck Lascombes | | 2:36 |
| 3. | "Freezing Out" (featuring Peaches) | Dupieux; Peaches | | 2:44 |
| 4. | "Oiseaux" | Dupieux | | 1:15 |
| 5. | "Ruhe" (featuring Boys Noize) | Dupieux; Alexander Ridha | Quentin Dupieux; Alexander Ridha | 2:39 |
| 6. | "No Tony" (featuring Phra) | Dupieux; Francesco Barbaglia | | 1:28 |
| 7. | "End of the World" (featuring Skrillex) | Dupieux; Sonny Moore | Dupieux; Sonny Moore | 3:38 |
| 8. | "The One You Buy" | Dupieux | | 1:13 |
| 9. | "All Wet" (featuring Siriusmo) | Dupieux; Moritz Friedrich | | 3:11 |
| 10. | "Chairs" (featuring Mocky) | Dupieux; Dominic Salole | | 2:32 |
| 11. | "Your Liver" | Dupieux | | 2:04 |
| 12. | "Hand in the Fire (Album version)" (featuring Charli XCX) | Dupieux; Rostam Batmanglij; Noonie Bao; Andrew Wyatt; MNDR; Charlotte Aitchison | | 3:11 |
| 13. | "Low Ink" | Dupieux | | 2:02 |
| 14. | "Goulag Drums" | Dupieux | | 2:42 |
| 15. | "Useless" | Dupieux | | 1:06 |
| Total length: | | | | 34:23 |

== Charts ==
| Chart (2016) | Peak position |
|---|---|
| Belgian Albums (Ultratop Flanders) | 143 |
| Belgian Albums (Ultratop Wallonia) | 128 |
| French Albums (SNEP) | 60 |
