= Lambs Anger =

Studio album by Mr. Oizo
- Released: 17 November 2008
- Genre: Electronic
- Length: 44:32
- Label: Ed Banger Records
- Producer: Quentin Dupieux

Mr. Oizo chronology
Steak (2007)	Lambs Anger (2008)	Rubber (2010)

Singles from Lambs Anger
- 1. "Positif" Released: November 10, 2008; 2. "Pourriture" Released: March 16, 2009

Lambs Anger is the third studio album by Mr. Oizo. It was released by Ed Banger Records in France on 17 November 2008. Unlike his previous, more experimental albums, Lambs Anger features more dance-friendly sound. The album, along with its two singles, "Positif" and "Pourriture", charted in France. Lambs Anger received mostly positive reviews, calling it Mr. Oizo's most complete and accessible work, with a few publications criticizing the album's repetitiveness and the lack of ideas.

== Recording ==
Lambs Anger was recorded in six weeks. According to Mr Oizo, the recording process went easily and he ended up creating "a lot more music than [he] needed", only keeping the best material for the album.

While recording the album, Mr Oizo altered his approach to the recording process, opting in for a less complicated way. The musician said that previously, on his more experimental albums, he was "thinking too much" and "was probably trying too hard", so he would end up bored and unable to finish songs. Changing the process allowed him to remain focused by constantly switching up and surprising himself.

== Artwork ==
The cover art was created by a French graphic designer So Me. It depicts a cartoon rendition of Mr. Oizo's character Flat Eric. Monochrome hands are holding its face, one hand is opening one of Flat Eric's eyes while the other hand is preparing to slice the eye with a razor. The artwork references the scene from the 1929 French silent short film Un Chien Andalou. According to Clash magazine, the artwork suggests the death of the character and change in Mr. Oizo's style. However, the musician himself has said that the cover art is an homage and "a nod to an artistic movement".

== Release ==
Lambs Anger was released on November 17, 2008, on the French label Ed Banger Records. It was Mr. Oizo's first album for the label. The album charted in SNEP, the French official albums chart, reaching number 142 on it.

The album was supported by two singles. "Positif", released on November 10, 2008, peaked at number 90 on the French charts. "Pourriture", released on March 16, 2009, peaked at number 73 on the French charts.

== Critical reception ==
Professional ratings
Aggregate scores
Source	Rating
Metacritic	68/100
Review scores
Source	Rating
MusicOMH	4/5 stars
NME	3.5/5 stars
Pitchfork	2.9/10
PopMatters	3/10 stars
Resident Advisor	4.0/5
Spin	3.5/5 stars
URB	4/5 stars

At Metacritic, which assigns a weighted average score out of 100 to reviews from mainstream critics, the album received an average score of 68% based on 10 reviews, indicating "generally favorable reviews".

Ian Roullier of MusicOMH commended the album, calling it "a hyperactive but genuinely exciting listen." NME's Tony Naylor called Lambs Anger a "joyously daft party album". Resident Advisor praised the album for being Mr. Oizo's "most intelligible offering ever", calling it "edgy yet consistent, odd yet easy to embrace". Writing for Spin magazine, Mosi Reeves applauded Mr. Oizo for creating a "sweaty, gleefully claustrophobic dance workout that celebrates the current electro-funk renaissance". Aylin Zafar of URB magazine called Lambs Anger "the pitch-perfect soundtrack to an epic night out" praising Mr. Oizo's use of samples throughout the album. Clash magazine called Lambs Anger Mr. Oizo's "most complete work to date", describing it as an "array of electro house tomfoolery".

Lambs Anger had also received a few negative reviews. Brian Howe of Pitchfork described the album as "overblown and frantic, with a surplus of sounds and a dearth of ideas", criticizing "rigid repetitions of a single basic theme" on most of the tracks. PopMatters' Alan Ranta in the review for the album wrote: "This album is truly half crap, and I find myself spending most of the listening experience trying to figure out which half it is, rather than just enjoying the music".

== Track listing ==
All songs written, composed and produced by Quentin Dupieux except "Steroids" written by Uffie and Feadz.

No.	Title	Length
1.	"Hun"	2:12
2.	"Pourriture 2"	2:09
3.	"Z"	4:11
4.	"Cut Dick"	2:51
5.	"Two Takes It" (featuring Carmen Castro)	2:21
6.	"Rank"	1:36
7.	"Bruce Willis Is Dead"	3:19
8.	"Jo"	2:16
9.	"Positif"	2:51
10.	"Lambs Anger"	1:13
11.	"Erreur Jean" (featuring Error Smith)	2:48
12.	"Steroïds" (featuring Uffie)	2:39
13.	"Gay Dentists"	3:38
14.	"Pourriture 7"	3:24
15.	"W"	2:11
16.	"Lars Von Sen"	1:23
17.	"Blind Concerto"	3:20

iTunes edition bonus track
No.	Title	Length
18.	"Lambs Garbage (Unfinished)"	4:19

== Personnel ==
Credits are adapted from the album's liner notes.

- Mr. Oizo – production
- Uffie – songwriting
- Feadz – songwriting
- So Me – artwork

== Charts ==
Chart	Peak position
French Albums (SNEP)	142
