= Here's Johnny (song) =

1993 single by Hocus Pocus

- Original Dutch artwork

Single by Hocus Pocus
- B-side: "Lips 'N Lungs"; "Let Me Be Your Medicineman"; "Postcard from Armageddon"
- Released: 1993
- Studio: The Residence (Den Haag, Netherlands)
- Genre: Hardcore; gabber
- Length: 4:41
- Label: Earprotector
- Songwriters: Xtro; Qbrick
- Producers: Xtro; Qbrick

Hocus Pocus singles chronology
| "Hocus Pocus" (1992) | "Here's Johnny" (1993) | "Here's Johnny ('96 remixes)" (1996) |

Music video
- "Here's Johnny" on YouTube

"Here's Johnny" (or "Here's Johnny!") is a song by Dutch dance music duo Hocus Pocus, also known as Doop. It was originally released in the Netherlands in 1993 and found success in Spain the same year, peaking at number two on the AFYVE chart. In 1995, it became a surprise hit in Australia, staying atop the ARIA Singles Chart for six weeks and becoming the first dance song to top the chart with no radio support. The song was remixed in 1996, when it briefly charted in the Netherlands as the "'96 remixes".

== Chart performance ==
In December 1993, "Here's Johnny" charted in Spain, reaching the top 10 of the AFYVE singles chart during the final chart week of the year. On 3 January 1994, the song climbed to its peak of number two. The track spent a further seven weeks in the Spanish top 20. In January 1995, the song was released in Australia and debuted at number 40 on 22 January. With no radio support, the song rose up the ARIA Singles Chart, reaching the top 10 in February. On 5 March 1995, the song climbed to number two, where it stayed for three weeks. Afterwards, "Here's Johnny" ascended to number one on 26 March, staying there for six weeks in total. In doing so, it became the first dance song to top Australia's chart without any support from radio.

On 7 May 1995, the song dropped to number five on the ARIA Singles Chart, and it remained within the top 50 for six more issues, totalling 22 weeks on the chart. "Here's Johnny" ended 1995 as Australia's 14th-best-selling single and earned a platinum certification from the Australian Recording Industry Association (ARIA) for shipping over 70,000 units. In 1996, various remixes of the song were released as a single in the Netherlands, reaching number three on the Single Top 100 Tipparade and number nine on the Dutch Top 40 Tipparade.

== Track listings ==
Dutch CD and 12-inch single

1. "Here's Johnny!" – 4:41
2. "Here's Johnny!" (Bam Bam Bam) – 5:05
3. "Lips 'N Lungs" – 5:40
4. "Here's Johnny!" (hardcore) – 5:32
5. "Let Me Be Your Medicineman" – 5:05
6. "Postcard from Armageddon" – 2:59

Dutch remix CD and 12-inch single

1. "Here's Johnny!" (Ramirez remix) – 4:26
2. "Here's Johnny!" (Remix DFC) – 4:02
3. "Bow-Chi-Bow" (Xtro & Qbrick remix) – 5:42

Australian CD and cassette single

1. "Here's Johnny" – 4:41
2. "Here's Johnny!" (Bam Bam Bam) – 5:05
3. "Here's Johnny!" (hardcore) – 5:32
4. "Here's Johnny!" (Ramirez remix) – 4:26
5. "Here's Johnny!" (Remix DFC) – 4:02
6. "Bow-Chi-Bow" (Xtro & Qbrick remix) – 5:42

Dutch CD single—'96 remixes

1. "Here's Johnny!" (Digidance Happy Hardcore radio mix) – 3:43
2. "Here's Johnny!" (Hocus Pocus '96 remix) – 4:30
3. "Here's Johnny!" (Gabba DJ mix) – 5:50
4. "C'est quoi c'est quoi" (Australian live version) – 6:00
5. "Here's Johnny!" (Greenfield's Bam Da Dub mix) – 5:20
6. "Here's Johnny!" (Digidance Happy Hardcore extended mix) – 5:15

Dutch 12-inch single—'96 remixes

A1. "Here's Johnny!" (Gabba DJ mix) – 5:50
A2. "C'est quoi c'est quoi" (Australian live version) – 6:00
B1. "Here's Johnny!" (Digidance Happy Hardcore extended mix) – 5:15
B2. "Here's Johnny!" (Hocus Pocus '96 remix) – 4:30
B3. "Here's Johnny!" (Greenfield's Bam Da Dub mix) – 5:20

German, Austrian, and Swiss CD single—'96 remixes

1. "Here's Johnny!" (Digidance Happy Hardcore radio mix) – 3:43
2. "Here's Johnny!" (original version) – 4:41
3. "Here's Johnny!" (Greenfield's Bam Da Dub mix) – 5:20
4. "Here's Johnny!" (Gabba DJ mix) – 5:50
5. "Here's Johnny!" (Digidance Happy Hardcore extended mix) – 5:15

== Charts ==
=== Weekly charts ===
==== Original version ====
| Chart (1993–1995) | Peak position |
|---|---|
| Australia (ARIA) | 1 |
| Europe (Eurochart Hot 100) | 78 |
| Spain (AFYVE) | 2 |

==== 1996 remixes ====
| Chart (1996) | Peak position |
|---|---|
| Netherlands (Dutch Top 40 Tipparade) | 9 |
| Netherlands (Single Top 100 Tipparade) | 3 |

=== Year-end charts ===
| Chart (1995) | Position |
|---|---|
| Australia (ARIA) | 14 |

== Certifications ==
| Region | Certification | Certified units/sales |
|---|---|---|
| Australia (ARIA) | Platinum | 70,000^{^} |
^{^} Shipments figures based on certification alone.
