= Stade 2 =

Studio album by Mr. Oizo
- Released: 11 November 2011
- Genres: Electronic, avant-garde
- Length: 32:09
- Label: Ed Banger Records
- Producer: Quentin Dupieux

Mr. Oizo chronology
Rubber (2010)	Stade 2 (2011)	The Church (2014)

Professional ratings
Review scores
Source	Rating
AllMusic	link
Consequence of Sound	link
musicOMH	link
Sputnik Music	link
Tiny Mix Tapes	2/5 link

Stade 2 is the fourth studio album by Mr. Oizo. The album was first released on iTunes only on 11 November 2011 on Ed Banger Records, and later released both as CD and in other music stores on 27 December. The vinyl format was released in 2012.

This album has received mixed reviews, with Tiny Mix Tapes and Consequence of Sound particularly disliking it.

The cover art is a stylized imitation of David Hockney's 1972 painting Portrait of an Artist (Pool with Two Figures) by the artist So Me.

== Track listing ==
No.	Title	Length
1.	"Introeil"	0:54
2.	"Camelfuck"	2:45
3.	"Douche Beat"	3:17
4.	"Datsun"	3:18
5.	"Ska"	3:03
6.	"Edn"	1:03
7.	"Cheeree"	3:09
8.	"Oral Sax (feat. Annie Mac)"	2:04
9.	"France7"	3:38
10.	"Chiffon"	1:54
11.	"Pompe"	0:57
12.	"Stade 2"	3:02
13.	"Druide"	3:05
Total length:		32:09
