= Flat Beat =

1999 single by Mr. Oizo

Single by Mr. Oizo

from the album Analog Worms Attack
- B-side: "Monday Massacre"; "Sick Dog Try to Speak"
- Released: 22 March 1999
- Genre: Electro house; French electronica; techno
- Length: 5:25 (original version); 4:00 (radio edit)
- Label: F Communications
- Songwriter: Mr. Oizo
- Producer: Mr. Oizo

Mr. Oizo singles chronology
"Analog Worms Attack" (1999)	"Flat Beat" (1999)	"Last Night a DJ Killed My Dog" (2000)

Music video
- "Flat Beat" on YouTube

"Flat Beat" is an instrumental by French musician Mr. Oizo. It was released on 22 March 1999 through F Communications and was included as a bonus track on his debut studio album, Analog Worms Attack (1999). An accompanying music video was released on VHS. The music video features Flat Eric, a puppet, head banging to the track.

Widely publicised by Flat Eric's appearance in many commercials for Levi's and the popularity of the music video, the track became a surprise European hit. "Flat Beat" peaked at number five on the French Singles Chart and reached number one in Austria, Finland, Flanders, Germany, Italy, and the United Kingdom. In 2003, Q Magazine ranked "Flat Beat" number 175 on their list of the "1001 Best Songs Ever".

== Background ==
In an interview with XLR8R magazine, Quentin Dupieux stated that it took him only two hours with a Korg MS-20 to produce. The instrumental is mainly composed of a repeated bassline, and it samples "Put Your Love in My Tender Care" by the Fatback Band.

== Critical reception ==
Stevie Chick from NME wrote, "Leading sociologists are calling it the 'Flat Eric Phenomenon'. Red-top tabloids print instructions for the Flat Eric window moves and White Van Man is overjoyed. Yes, helped along by his friends at the Levi's company, Mr Oizo could soon be celebrating the inevitable outcome of such a profitable partnership, a Number One record. And that would be a fine thing, not least because 'Flat Beat' is a sleek slice of supremely filtered, speaker-busting electro that would undoubtedly be a minor specialist hit in its own right if released without the might of this high-profile campaign, but also because Flat Eric, the ice-cool yellow muppet, is one of the most fascinating creatures to have entered the crazy world of rock'n'roll in recent memory."

== Commercial performance ==
The song was a surprise international success in Europe, topping the charts in Austria, Finland, Flanders, Germany, Italy, and the United Kingdom. In the UK, it sold 284,000 copies during its first week of release and was the seventh song featured in a Levi's advert to top the UK Singles Chart, as well as the 25th instrumental single to top the chart. It was also the first UK number-one single by a French musician since Charles Aznavour topped the chart with "She" in 1974. On the Eurochart Hot 100, "Flat Beat" peaked at number two and was Europe's 11th-most-successful hit of 1999. "Flat Beat" was not as successful in France, where it peaked at number five and did not receive airplay, selling only a quarter of the copies as it did in the UK.

== Music video ==
A still from the music video

Prior to the "Flat Beat", Dupieux created Flat Eric, a fictional puppet character, for Levi's commercials for Sta-Prest One Crease Denim Clothing, built by Jim Henson's Creature Shop. The popularity of the commercials lead to a music video for the song being created, also featuring Flat Eric.

The accompanying music video for "Flat Beat" was directed by Quentin Dupieux and released alongside the single release. The video was released on VHS and later on digital download services and YouTube on the official F Communications channel. The video was listed in Maxim's list of Best Puppets in a Music Video.

== Legacy ==
In 2003, Q Magazine ranked "Flat Beat" number 175 in their list of the "1001 Best Songs Ever". In September 2005, Stylus Magazine included the track's bassline at number 13 in their list of the "Top 50 Basslines of All Time", while Mixmag included it in their "The Best Basslines in Dance Music" in 2020. The magazine added, "Disclaimer: it's likely you'll be thinking there's a bees' nest in the corner of your room after listening to it. Don't let that put you off, though. 'Flat Beat' boasts one of the best basslines of all time." In 2014, English DJ and producer Duke Dumont ranked it number nine in his list of "The 10 Best UK Number One Singles", saying, "Probably the strangest number one to date. The Levi's advert helped, obviously. Directing that Levi's advert and putting your own song in it also helps. But I remember this having a cult following among garage DJs within the UK. I doubt Mr. Oizo was even aware of UK garage, but he accidentally created possibly the first dubstep record."

== Track listings ==
French VHS single
No.	Title	Length
1.	"Flat Beat"	3:06

European CD single
No.	Title	Length
1.	"Flat Beat" (radio edit)	4:00
2.	"Monday Massacre"	3:36

UK CD single
No.	Title	Length
1.	"Flat Beat" (radio edit)	4:00
2.	"Flat Beat"	5:25
3.	"Monday Massacre"	3:36

UK 12-inch single
No.	Title	Length
1.	"Flat Beat"	5:25
2.	"Monday Massacre"	3:36
3.	"Sick Dog Try to Speak"	3:36

UK cassette single
No.	Title	Length
1.	"Flat Beat" (radio edit)	4:00
2.	"Flat Beat"	5:25

Australian and New Zealand single
No.	Title	Length
1.	"Flat Beat"	5:25
2.	"Monday Massacre"	3:36
3.	"Sick Dog Try to Speak"	3:36
4.	"Flat Beat" (radio edit)	4:00

== Charts ==
=== Weekly charts ===
Weekly chart performance for "Flat Beat"
Chart (1999–2000)	Peak position
Australia (ARIA)	84
Austria (Ö3 Austria Top 40)	1
Belgium (Ultratop 50 Flanders)	1
Belgium (Ultratop 50 Wallonia)	2
Denmark (IFPI)	3
Europe (Eurochart Hot 100)	2
Finland (Suomen virallinen lista)	1
France (SNEP)	5
Germany (GfK)	1
Greece (IFPI)	5
Iceland (Íslenski Listinn Topp 40)	5
Ireland (IRMA)	2
Italy (Musica e dischi)	1
Netherlands (Dutch Top 40)	4
Netherlands (Single Top 100)	5
New Zealand (Recorded Music NZ)	12
Norway (VG-lista)	2
Scottish Singles Sales (Official Charts)	1
Spain (AFYVE)	2
Sweden (Sverigetopplistan)	4
Switzerland (Schweizer Hitparade)	4
UK Singles (Official Charts)	1
UK Dance (Official Charts)	1
UK Indie (Official Charts)	1

=== Year-end charts ===
Year-end chart rankings for "Flat Beat"
Chart (1999)	Position
Austria (Ö3 Austria Top 40)	20
Belgium (Ultratop 50 Flanders)	21
Belgium (Ultratop 50 Wallonia)	9
Europe (Eurochart Hot 100)	11
Europe Border Breakers (Music & Media)	29
France (SNEP)	26
Germany (Media Control)	8
Netherlands (Dutch Top 40)	60
Netherlands (Single Top 100)	42
Spain (AFYVE)	11
Sweden (Hitlistan)	46
Switzerland (Schweizer Hitparade)	24
UK Singles (OCC)	9

== Certifications ==
Certifications and sales for "Flat Beat"
Region	Certification	Certified units/sales
Austria (IFPI Austria)	Gold	25,000^{*}
Belgium (BRMA)	Platinum	50,000^{*}
Finland (Musiikkituottajat)	Gold	5,075
Germany (BVMI)	Platinum	500,000^{^}
Sweden (GLF)	Gold	15,000^{^}
United Kingdom (BPI)	Platinum	678,000
Summaries
Worldwide	—	3,000,000
^{*} Sales figures based on certification alone.^{^} Shipments figures based on certification alone.
