= The Church (Mr. Oizo album) =

Studio album by Mr. Oizo
- Released: 18 November 2014
- Genres: Wonky, electro house, glitch, tech house
- Length: 29:49
- Label: Brainfeeder
- Producer: Quentin Dupieux

Mr. Oizo chronology
Wrong Cops (Best Of) (2014)	The Church (2014)	All Wet (2016)

Professional ratings
Review scores
Source	Rating
AllMusic	3/5 stars
Clash	6/10
Pitchfork	4.9/10

The Church is the fifth studio album by French electronic music composer Mr. Oizo. The album was released on 18 November 2014, under Brainfeeder Records.

== Critical reception ==
AllMusic wrote that "while the best songs here are entertaining individually, they tend to diminish each other within the album's context".

== Track listing ==
All tracks written and produced by Quentin Dupieux except where noted.

No.	Title	Writer(s)	Producers	Length
1.	"Bear Biscuit"			2:42
2.	"Ham"			3:12
3.	"Destop"			2:10
4.	"Dry Run" (featuring Bart B More)	Quentin Dupieux; Bart van der Meer	Mr. Oizo; Bart B More	3:25
5.	"Mass Doom"			2:32
6.	"Machyne"			3:08
7.	"iSoap"	Dupieux; Cédric Savelli		4:02
8.	"Torero"	Dupieux; Sentier Techno Model	Mr. Oizo; Sentier Techno Model	3:58
9.	"Memorex"			1:08
10.	"The Church"			3:32
Total length:				29:49
