= Doop (band) =

Dutch dance music production duo

- Also known as: Hocus Pocus, Ferry & Garnefski
- Origin: Netherlands
- Genres: Eurodance, electro swing, happy hardcore
- Years active: 1994–present
- Members: Ferry Ridderhof; Peter Garnefski

Doop is a dance music production duo from the Netherlands formed by Ferry Ridderhof and Peter Garnefski, who have also recorded under the name Hocus Pocus and various other project names. They were producers and band members of Peplab.

Doop's 1994 single "Doop" reached No. 1 in the UK. The song was influenced by the 1920s Charleston dance, with lyrics consisting entirely of the word "doop" scatted over a fast-paced big band sample. In the US, a remix of the track by American house artist David Morales was released.

Under the name Hocus Pocus, the duo released "Here's Johnny!", which reached No. 1 in Australia in 1995.

== Discography ==
=== Doop ===
Albums

- Doop Mania – L'Album des remixes (1994)
- Circus Doop (1995) – NL #74

EPs

- The Doop Eepee (2011)

Singles

Year	Song	Peak chart positions										Certifications	Album
Year	Song	NL 40	NL 100	AUS	AUT	BEL (Fl)	FRA	GER	SWI	UK	US Dance	Certifications	Album
1994	"Doop"	11	11	5	16	24	13	6	2	1	2	AUS: Gold; UK: Gold	Circus Doop
1994	"Doop" (special remixes)	17	13	—	—	—	—	—	—	—	—		—N/a
1994	"Huckleberry Jam"	19	22	—	—	50	—	—	—	88	—		Circus Doop
1995	"Wan Too!"	—	—	—	—	—	—	—	—	—	—		Circus Doop
1996	"Ridin'"	19	16	—	—	—	—	—	—	—	—		non-album single
2011	"My Chihuahua"	—	—	—	—	—	—	—	—	—	—		The Doop Eepee
2014	"Tequila"	—	—	—	—	—	—	—	—	—	—		non-album single

=== Hocus Pocus ===
Albums

- God Devil Hell Heaven (1997)

Singles

Year	Song	Peak chart positions				Certifications	Album
Year	Song	NL 40	NL 100	AUS	SPA	Certifications	Album
1992	"Hocus Pocus" (released under the artist name Vicious Delicious)	—	—	—	—		God Devil Hell Heaven
1993	"Here's Johnny!"	—	—	1	2	AUS: Platinum	God Devil Hell Heaven
1996	"Here's Johnny!" ('96 Remixes)	— (Note: "Here's Johnny!" ('96 Remixes) did not chart on the Dutch Top 40, but peaked at number 9 on the Tipparade bubbling under chart.)	— (Note: "Here's Johnny!" ('96 Remixes) did not chart on the Single Top 100, but peaked at number 3 on the Single Tip bubbling under chart.)	—	—		God Devil Hell Heaven
1997	"God Devil Hell Heaven"	—	—	—	—		God Devil Hell Heaven
