= Doop (song) =

1994 single by Doop

Single by Doop

from the album Circus Doop
- Released: 28 February 1994
- Genre: Eurodance; electro swing; Charleston
- Length: 3:35
- Label: Clubstitute
- Songwriters: Peter Garnefski; Frederik Ferry Ridderhof
- Producers: Peter Garnefski; Frederik Ferry Ridderhof

Doop singles chronology
"Doop" (1994)	"Huckleberry Jam" (1995)

Music video
- "Doop" on YouTube

"Doop" is an instrumental by Dutch Eurodance group Doop. It was released on 28 February 1994, by Clubstitute Records, as the first single from their debut album, Circus Doop (1994). The song consists of a Charleston-based big band number set against a house backing track and has only three words: Doopi, Doopi, Doop. "Doop" achieved success in several countries, including the United Kingdom, where it spent three weeks atop the UK Singles Chart. In the United States, the song reached number two on the Billboard Dance Club Play chart. Two main versions (each with its own corresponding radio edit) were issued under the names of two different big bands, with the "Urge 2 Merge radio mix" combining sections of both. In 2005, the song was covered by Looney Tunez vs. Doop.

== Background and release ==
Dutch musicians Ferry Ridderhof and Peter Garnefski composed, arranged, and produced the song, which was recorded in November and December 1993 at their Residance Studio, located in the living room of Ridderhof's home in Kijkduin, The Hague. They got the idea after visiting house parties in and around The Hague and hearing house tracks with 130–135 beats per minute. They told in a 1994 interview, "What impressed us at the mellow house parties was the way people were dancing—with their hands kind of waving, like the Charleston was danced in the 1920s and 1930s. That was our main source of inspiration for 'Doop'."

Ridderhof and Garnefski asked three local-musicians to play Charleston-type music. They recorded it, and mixed fragments with their own house music. The first version appeared on a 12-inch vinyl maxi-single which was sent to 500 outlets of the Dutch dance scene, receiving rave reactions from underground house DJs. The duo described "Doop" as "a happy, 130 beats-per-minute house production with strong charleston influences". After the song's success in their native Netherlands, 25 UK labels wanted to release it in the UK. Citybeat won the competition and the song became a UK number-one hit for three weeks on the UK Singles Chart, cullminating in sales of close to 500,000 units with the added bonus of compilation spin-offs. After it topped the UK chart, it caused a Charleston revival in young and old sections of the British population. Before the song was released in the US and Japan in the middle of 1994, it sold nearly 1 million copies in Europe. The international chart impact of "Doop" surprised the duo. Peter Garnefski told, "Of course, we know that it is a strong composition. However, we didn't expect that it would become such a huge chart-crasher."

== Critical reception ==
Larry Flick from Billboard magazine wrote, "European pop smash finally gets a shot at stateside success. Mostly instrumental romp combines a steady dance beat with classic ragtime music to blasting effect. Crashing cymbals and brassy horns will keep the summer vibe alive on top 40 and rhythm-crossover radio. Icing on the cake are 'doop-doop' vocal samples and live marching drum rolls." Tom Ewing of Freaky Trigger noted that "while it's never anything more than 'the Charleston with a donk on it', it's also far more generous with its hooks and energy than one-line descriptions suggest. It does enough with its squealing horns and showy, tumbling drum samples that the entry of the scoo-be-doo vocals feels like a delightful bonus." In his weekly UK chart commentary, James Masterton wrote, "Quite why a piece of instrumental jazz should have become so big is really one to puzzle at, yet it is an astoundingly brilliant record and as a national talking-point has to be fancied for a No.1 position next week."

Maria Jimenez from Music & Media remarked that the single "takes the old charleston and drops it into a '90s dance music context." Andy Beevers from Music Week gave the song a score of four out of five, adding that "this unlikely combination of Nineties house sounds and Twenties Charleston/ragtime rhythms" has been "creating dancefloor mayhem ever since." He concluded, "There is bound to be strong DJ demand for the track, which could crossover in a big way thanks to its novelty value." Sylvia Patterson from Smash Hits gave "Doop" three out of five, writing, "Ludicrously catchy mickey-mouse rave-up sensation featuring someone playing the spoons, someone on the party blower with a feather on the end of it and Rolf Harris on the stylophone." In 2011, the song placed third in an NME list of the "25 most annoying songs ever".

== Chart performance ==
In Europe, "Doop" peaked at number one in the United Kingdom for three weeks in March 1994, starting from its second week on the UK Singles Chart. It also topped the UK Dance Singles Chart. The single entered the top 10 of the charts in Finland, Germany, Hungary, Ireland, Norway, Poland, Spain, and Switzerland, as well as on the Eurochart Hot 100, where the song peaked at number three. Additionally, "Doop" was a top-20 hit in Austria, Denmark, France and the Netherlands. Outside Europe, the song reached number two on the US Billboard Dance Club Play chart and number five in Australia, where it spent six weeks inside the top 10 of the ARIA singles chart. In West Asia, it became a top-20 hit in Israel, peaking at number 17 on 5 April 1994. The single was awarded with a gold record in Australia and the United Kingdom.

== Music video ==
The accompanying music video for "Doop" was directed by Czar. It features the duo as a band with two female singers, Paskalle Kruyssen and Eline van der Ploeg. Mick Green from Cash Box commented, "The accompanying video features two girl singers in flapper dresses dancing their own version of the Charleston and a dancer in top hat and tails carrying an imaginary cane, twisting and sliding in a modern variation of the original steps. It has caused a dance sensation, and in clubs throughout the UK youngsters are copying or making up their own steps. They used to say 'bop until you drop,' now it appears to be 'doop until you're pooped!'" Sylvia Patterson from Smash Hits said, "This lot did that quite good video with the turntables that turned into the word "doop"." The video was A-listed on German music television channel VIVA and received active rotation on MTV Europe in April and May 1994.

== Track listings ==
=== Original version ===
- CD single
1. "Doop" (Jean Lejeux & Son Orchestre) – 3:35
2. "Doop" (Sidney Berlin ragtime band) – 3:08
- Cassette, 7-inch single
1. "Doop" (Urge 2 Merge radio mix) – 3:33
2. "Doop" (Jean Lejeux radio mix) – 3:26
- CD maxi, Europe and Australia
1. "Doop" (Sidney Berlin's ragtime band) – 3:08
2. "Doop" (Jean Lejeux & Son Ochestre) – 3:26
3. "Doop" (Urge 2 merge) – 3:33
4. "Doop" (Sidney Berlin's ragtime band – extended version) – 5:28
5. "Doop" (Jean Lejeux & Son Ochestre – extended version) – 7:18
- CD maxi, UK
1. "Doop" (Urge 2 merge radio mix) – 3:33
2. "Doop" (Jean Lejeux radio mix) – 3:26
3. "Doop" (Sidney Berlin ragtime radio edit) – 3:08
4. "Doop" (Mother remix) – 7:17
5. "Doop" (Judge Jules and Michael Skins remix) – 6:06
- CD maxi, US
1. "Doop" (Sidney Berlin ragtime band) – 3:08
2. "Doop" (Def Doop mix) – 11:32
3. "Doop" (Sidney Berlin ragtime band—extended version) – 5:28
4. "Doop" (Jean Lejeux & Son Orchestre—extended version) – 7:18
5. "Doop" (basstrumental) – 6:40
6. "Doop" (capricorn remix) – 6:55
- CD maxi, France
1. "Doop" (original mix) – 3:10
2. "Doop" (radio edit) – 3:35
3. "Doop" (capricorn remix edit) – 4:40
- 12-inch maxi, Netherlands
1. "Doop" (Jean Lejeux & Son Orchestre) – 7:18
2. "Doop" (Sidney Berlin ragtime band) – 5:28
3. "Doop" (Doop dub) – 5:28
4. "Doop" (Urge 2 merge) – 5:31
- 12-inch maxi, UK
1. "Doop" (Jean Lejeux & Son Orchestre) – 7:18
2. "Doop" (Mother remix) – 6:10
3. "Doop" (Sidney Berlin ragtime band) – 5:28
4. "Doop" (Judge Jules and Michael Skins remix) – 6:06
- 12-inch maxi, US
1. "Doop" (Def Doop mix) – 11:32
2. "Doop" (Sidney Berlin ragtime band – extended version) – 5:28
3. "Doop" (basstrumental) – 6:40

=== Remixes ===
- CD maxi, France
1. "Doop" (Def Doop mix) – 11:32
2. "Doop" (David Morales radio mix) – 3:45
3. "Doop" (D. Beat) – 4:18
4. "Doop" (basstrumental) – 6:40
- CD maxi, Germany
1. "Doop" (Jean Lejeux & Son Orchestre) – 7:18
2. "Doop" (Mother remix) – 6:10
3. "Doop" (Sidney Berlin ragtime band) – 5:28
4. "Doop" (Judge Jules and Michael Skins remix) – 6:06
- CD maxi, Netherlands and Australia
1. "Doop" (Jean Lejeux Station edit) – 3:35
2. "Doop" (Sidney Berlin ragtime band) – 3:08
3. "Doop" (capricorn remix) – 6:55
4. "Doop" (Ferry & Garnefski remix) – 7:20
5. "Yabadabadoop!" – 8:13
- 12-inch maxi, Germany
1. "Doop" (capricorn remix) – 6:55
2. "Doop" (Doop dub) – 5:38
3. "Yabadabadoop!" – 8:13
4. "Doop" (Mother remix) – 7:17
5. "Doop" (Judge Jules & Michael Skins remix) – 6:06
- 12-inch maxi, Netherlands
1. "Doop" (Capricorn remix) – 6:55
2. "Doop" (Ferry & Garnefski remix) – 7:20
3. "Yabadabadoop!" – 8:13

== Charts ==
=== Weekly charts ===
Weekly chart performance for "Doop"
Chart (1994)	Peak position
Australia (ARIA)	5
Austria (Ö3 Austria Top 40)	16
Belgium (Ultratop 50 Flanders)	24
Denmark (IFPI)	13
Europe (Eurochart Hot 100)	3
Europe (European Dance Radio)	2
Europe (European Hit Radio)	28
Finland (Suomen virallinen lista)	3
France (SNEP)	13
Germany (GfK)	6
Iceland (Íslenski Listinn Topp 40)	27
Ireland (IRMA)	2
Israel (Israeli Singles Chart)	17
Netherlands (Dutch Top 40)	11
Netherlands (Single Top 100)	11
Quebec (ADISQ)	42
Scottish Singles Sales (Official Charts)	1
Spain (AFYVE)	3
Switzerland (Schweizer Hitparade)	2
UK Singles (Official Charts)	1
UK Airplay (Music Week)	17
UK Dance (Music Week)	1
UK Club Chart (Music Week)	2
US Dance Club Play (Billboard)	2

=== Year-end charts ===
Year-end chart performance for "Doop"
Chart (1994)	Position
Australia (ARIA)	44
Europe (Eurochart Hot 100)	28
Germany (Media Control)	50
Netherlands (Dutch Top 40)	114
Netherlands (Single Top 100)	27
Switzerland (Schweizer Hitparade)	17
UK Singles (OCC)	10
UK Club Chart (Music Week)	11
US Dance Club Play (Billboard)	43

== Certifications ==
Certifications for "Doop"
Region	Certification	Certified units/sales
Australia (ARIA)	Gold	35,000^{^}
United Kingdom (BPI)	Gold	400,000^{^}
^{^} Shipments figures based on certification alone.

== Release history ==
Release dates and formats for "Doop"
Region	Version	Date	Format(s)	Label(s)	Ref.
United Kingdom	"Doop"	28 February 1994	7-inch vinyl; 12-inch vinyl; CD; cassette	City Beat	
Australia	"Doop"	11 April 1994	CD; cassette	Liberation	
Australia	"Doop"	16 May 1994	CD; cassette (remixes)	Liberation	
United States	"Doop"	August 1994	12-inch vinyl; CD	MCA	
Japan	"Doop" / "Huckleberry Jam"	26 April 1995	CD	Mercury	
