= Rubber (soundtrack) =

2010 film soundtrack album

Soundtrack album by Gaspard Augé and Mr. Oizo
- Released: 8 November 2010
- Genre: House
- Length: 34:19
- Labels: Ed Banger Records; Because Music
- Producers: Gaspard Augé; Quentin Dupieux

Mr. Oizo chronology
Lambs Anger (2008)	Rubber (2010)	Stade 2 (2011)

Gaspard Augé chronology
Rubber (2010)	Escapades (2021)

Rubber (Original Soundtrack) is the soundtrack album to the 2010 film Rubber directed by Quentin Dupieux. The album featured the film's score composed by Dupieux under the stage name Mr. Oizo and Gaspard Augé as the co-composer. The 15-track album was released by Ed Banger Records and Because Music on 8 November 2010.

== Background ==
Quentin Dupieux also scored the film under his stage name Mr. Oizo. Having been multifaceted on his roles for this film, directing, writing, filming and editing, Dupieux wanted Gaspard Augé of Justice to co-compose the film as he cannot bring emotion and eerie vibes to the film musically and had focused on club music. Although Augé was not a score composer, Dupieux assisted him to find the specific sound of the film. Augé stated that he indulged in melodic obsessions without remorse where his ideas borrowed from French soundtracks. Speaking to The Wall Street Journal, Dupieux added that he was not happy about the film's music, while as a standalone album worked out, does not really worked perfectly with the film. Augé, however, recalled that the soundtrack was made in a hurry owing to Dupieux's working style and his likeness to stay in the emergency state and not losing the pleasure of the first draft and idea, which led the film, had this weird baroque of MIDI music that fit the film well.

== Release ==
The album was published by Ed Banger Records and Because Music. A four-track extended play from the album, preceded the release on 12 July 2010, featuring: "Rubber", "Rubber (Flying Lotus Unprotected Sex Mix)", "Tricycle Express" and "Polocaust". The soundtrack was released on 8 November 2010 in digital and physical formats.

== Reception ==
Jakob Dorof of Tiny Mix Tapes wrote "In terms of French electro-people making movie scores, SebastiAn's magnificent work this past year for Notre Jour Viendra remains the go-to album, but Rubber's next in line." Tony Poland of Juno Records said that the album "finds its legs when bass patterns reminiscent of Justice in their pomp take centre stage." Ben Hogwood of musicOMH wrote "All of which adds up to a soundtrack that is too random and too knowing for its own good, in keeping with the film it would seem. Rubber is imaginative for sure, but skids around in random directions, losing its tread by the end." Oliver Lyletton of IndieWire ranked it as one among the best soundtracks of 2011, saying "Self-consciously hip, the beats also contrast strongly with the absolute obliviousness of our human characters, cementing Rubber's "too cool for school" absurdism."

== Track listing ==
Track listing
No.	Title	Length
1.	"Sympho8"	1:28
2.	"Rubber"	4:08
3.	"Crows and Guts"	2:28
4.	"Tricycle Express"	3:50
5.	"Everything Is Fake"	1:38
6.	"Room 16"	2:27
7.	"Bellyball Road"	1:07
8.	"No Reason"	2:10
9.	"Sheila"	3:27
10.	"Racket"	1:34
11.	"Le Caoutchouc"	1:45
12.	"Polocaust"	1:20
13.	"Dump"	1:13
14.	"Sunsetire"	1:30
15.	"Tv Slut (Not Released)"	1:44
