= F Communications =

French record label

- Founded: 1994; 32 years ago
- Founder: Eric Morand; Laurent Garnier
- Defunct: 2008
- Distributors: PIAS Recordings (in Europe and the U.S); Beggars Group (in Canada); MCD (in Brazil)
- Genre: Electronic; rock
- Country of origin: France
- Official website: fcom.fr

F Communications, also known as FCom, was a French record label based in Paris. It was founded in 1994 by Eric Morand and Laurent Garnier. It produced dance and electronic music by artists like Avril, Garnier, and Mr. Oizo amongst many others.

In 1999, it was named "one of France's premier labels specializing in electronic music".

In 2003, the record label had a turnover of 2.4 million euros.

The record label folded in 2008.

== See also ==
- List of record labels
