= Record Makers =

- Industry: Music recording
- Founded: 16 July 1999
- Founders: Nicolas Godin, Jean-Benoît Dunckel, Marc Teissier du Cros, Stéphane Elfassi
- Headquarters: Paris, France
- Website: https://recordmakers.com/

Record Makers is an independent record label and music publisher based in Paris producing primarily pop and electro genres, also known for its contributions to the latter generation of the French Touch genre. It was founded in 2000 by Air and their managers Marc Teissier du Cros and Stéphane Elfassi to release Air's score to Sofia Coppola’s 1999 film The Virgin Suicides. Record Makers has produced many artists since, both French and international, across various genres, including Sébastien Tellier, Kavinsky, and Cola Boyy.

== History ==
=== Origins ===
In 2000, the French electropop band Air and their managers Marc Teissier du Cros and Stéphane Elfassi started the Record Makers label to put out the score they had composed for The Virgin Suicides. The record was met with both critical and commercial success, earning best film soundtrack at the 2001 Victoires de la musique (the French equivalent of the Grammy Awards) and a nomination for a BRIT award for best soundtrack/cast recording in 2001. The album was certified gold in France and in the UK and is considered by several music publications, including NME and Pitchfork, to be one of the best movie soundtracks of all time. The song "Playground Love", which appears on the album, was performed by the band at the closing ceremony of the 2024 summer Olympics in Paris with Gordon Tracks (a.k.a Thomas Mars) of Phoenix. Air ceased their roles within the label in 2004.

=== Sébastien Tellier ===
The first signature on the label was Sébastien Tellier, who released his debut album L'incroyable Vérité in 2001. Tellier toured alongside Air as an opener during their 2001 tour to promote the album. His song "Fantino" off the record was featured in the soundtrack of Sofia Coppola’s Lost in Translation (2003). The song "La Ritournelle" off his second album, Politics, also released on the Record Makers label, has become an essential track, and was performed by Tellier at the opening ceremony of the Summer 2024 Paralympics in Paris. The album featured drums by the legendary Tony Allen, known for his work with Fela Kuti, and was mixed by Philippe Zdar (of Cassius).

=== Subsequent Signings ===
The second signing to the label was Detroit techno producer and artist Arpanet (a.k.a. Gerald Donald) of Drexciya and Dopplereffekt fame, followed by acts such as electro-rap group DSL, hip hop group Klub des Loosers, electronic music group Turzi, electro-pop bands Hypnolove and Sex in Dallas, among others.

=== Kavinsky ===
In 2006, Record Makers signed the electronic music artist Kavinsky, releasing two EPs, Teddy Boy and 1986 (in 2006 and 2007, respectively) and a single, "Nightcall". Produced by Guy-Manuel de Homem-Christo of Daft Punk, whom Kavinsky had been the opener for on their Alive 2007 tour, the track originally garnered minimal attention, until it was featured in the opening credits of the 2011 action film Drive. "Nightcall" then became a hit, charting at number 10 in France. It has since been certified diamond in France, gold in Denmark, Germany, and New Zealand, and silver in the United Kingdom. The song was performed at the closing ceremony of the 2024 summer Olympics in Paris with Angèle and Phoenix. A studio version of this cover was released in September 2024 on the Record Makers label, charting at number 3 in France. Kavinsky has released two albums on Record Makers since "Nightcall"; OutRun in 2013 and Reborn in 2022.

=== Since 2015 ===
With the international success of its French artists, the Record Makers name was put on the map, drawing attention from acts outside of France. While in its earlier stages the quasi entirety of Record Makers' roster were French artists, as of the second half of the 2010s the label increasingly signed international artists, including American burlesque dancer Dita Von Teese, Californian disco-funk artist Cola Boyy, Norwegian drummer and songwriter Lauritz Kaasa, and British-American singer-songwriter Alexander Dexter Jones. Other signings in recent years include the electro-pop producer and singer Blasé and the electronic musician nit.

=== Film soundtracks ===
Record Makers have released several film soundtracks since The Virgin Suicides, including four scores composed by Sébastien Tellier. The label also issued the first official release of the soundtrack of John Carpenter’s 1976 film Assault on Precinct 13 in 2003 which, up until that point, had been influential but only available in bootleg form. Record Makers handled the French distribution of the soundtrack for the 2011 film Drive, with Kavinsky's "Nightcall" as its opening track, and also issued the vinyl production of the soundtrack for the 2022 documentary Fire of Love, composed by Nicolas Godin (of Air).

=== Other activities ===
As of 2017, Record Makers is directed by Marc Teissier du Cros. The label's work extends beyond music production, additionally providing music publishing and artist management services. The American-Austrian singer Sofie Royer, Nicolas Godin, and Air are managed by the label.

== Artists ==
=== Music production ===
- Acid Washed
- Air
- Alexander Dexter Jones
- Arpanet
- Blasé
- Cola Boyy
- DAMIEN
- DSL
- Dita Von Teese
- Drive
- Findlay Brown
- Hypnolove
- I Love UFO
- John Carpenter
- John Carroll Kirby
- Kavinsky
- Kirin J. Callinan
- Klub des Loosers
- Midnight Juggernauts
- Mind Gamers
- Nicolas Godin
- Nit
- Puro Instinct
- Scratch Massive
- Sébastien Tellier
- Sex in Dallas
- Tristesse Contemporaine
- Turzi

=== Management ===
- Air
- Nicolas Godin
- Sofie Royer

== Discography ==
=== 2000 ===
- Air - The Virgin Suicides (album)
- Sébastien Tellier - L’Incroyable Vérité (album)

=== 2002 ===
- A Visible Boy - Side by Side (EP)
- DSL - Les Beats Qui Tapent Fort (single)
- Arpanet - NTT DoCoMo (single)
- Arpanet - Wireless Internet (album)
- Various - I Hear Voices (compilation)

=== 2003 ===
- Air - City Reading (album)
- Klub des Loosers - Baise Les Gens (single)
- John Carpenter - Assault on Precinct 13 (The Original Motion Picture Score) (album)
- DSL - J.A.Y.M. (album)
- Klub des Loosers - La Femme De Fer (EP)
- Sébastien Tellier - Beyond All Strategies (single)
- DSL - Sexual (EP)

=== 2004 ===
- Sébastien Tellier - Politics (album)
- Klub des Loosers - Sous Le Signe Du V (Doom EP) (EP)
- Klub des Loosers - Vive La Vie (album)

=== 2005 ===
- Turzi - Made Under Authority (album)
- Hypnolove - Mademoiselle (album)
- Kavinsky - Teddy Boy (EP)

=== 2006 ===
- I Love UFO - Wish (EP)
- Sébastien Tellier - Sessions (album)
- DAMIEN - L’art du disque (album)
- Arpanet - Reference Frame (album)
- Hypnolove - Eurolove (album)
- I Love UFO - Wish (album)
- Arpanet - Inertial Frame (album)

=== 2007 ===
- Kavinsky - 1986 (EP)
- Sex in Dallas - Forever Young (EP)
- Sex in Dallas - Hit Back Bow (EP)
- Sex in Dallas - Perpetual Emotion Maschine (album)
- Turzi - A (album)
- Turzi - Seven Inch Allah (EP)
- Sébastien Tellier - Sexual Sportswear (single)
- Sébastien Tellier - Narco (The Original Motion Picture Score) (album)

=== 2008 ===
- Sébastien Tellier - Sexuality (album)
- Sébastien Tellier - Divine (EP)
- Sébastien Tellier - Roche (single)

=== 2009 ===
- Sébastien Tellier - Broadway (EP)
- Sébastien Tellier - L’amour et la violence (single)
- Sébastien Tellier - Fingers of Steel (single)
- Sébastien Tellier - Kilometer (EP)
- Turzi - Buenos Aires / Bombay (EP)
- Turzi - B (album)
- Acid Washed - General Motors, Detroit, America - Snake (EP)

=== 2010 ===
- Acid Washed - Acid Washed (album)
- Kavinsky - Nightcall (EP)
- Sébastien Tellier - Sexuality Remix (album)
- Turzi - Baltimore (EP)
- Various - 10th Record Makers (compilation)
- Findlay Brown - Promised Land (EP)
- Acid Washed - Acid Washed (EP)

=== 2011 ===
- Sébastien Tellier - Love Songs (album)
- Hypnolove - Holiday Reverie (EP)
- Turzi - Turzi Électronique Expérience - Education (album)
- Turzi - Turzi Électronique Expérience - Connaissance (EP)
- Puro Instinct - Headbangers in Ecstasy (album)
- Various - Drive (Original Motion Picture Soundtrack) (album)

=== 2012 ===
- Acid Washed - For Your Eyes Only / Prince Acid (single)
- Sébastien Tellier - Cochon Ville, Pt. 1 (EP)
- Sébastien Tellier - My God Is Blue (album)
- Sébastien Tellier - Cochon Ville, Pt. 2 (EP)
- Sébastien Tellier - Sedulous (EP)
- Sébastien Tellier - Russian Attractions (EP)

=== 2013 ===
- Kavinsky - ProtoVision (EP)
- Kavinsky - OutRun (album)
- Hypnolove - Come to my Empire (EP)
- Kavinsky - Odd Look (EP)
- Acid Washed - Fire N’ Rain (EP)
- Sébastien Tellier and Caroline Polachek - In the Crew of Tea Time (with Caroline Polachek) (single)
- Hypnolove - Ghost Carnival (album)
- Midnight Juggernauts - Memorium (single)
- Acid Washed - House of Melancholy (album)
- Tristesse Contemporaine - Woodwork (EP)
- Midnight Juggernauts - Uncanny Valley (album)
- Hypnolove - Winter in the Sun (Pilooski Radio Edit) (single)
- Tristesse Contemporaine - Stay Golden (album)
- Sébastien Tellier - Confection (album)
- Tristesse Contemporaine - Fire (EP)
- Midnight Juggernauts - Systematic (EP)

=== 2014 ===
- Tristesse Contemporaine - I Do What I Want (EP)
- Sébastien Tellier - L’Aventura (album)
- Sébastien Tellier - Aller vers le soleil (EP)
- Sébastien Tellier - Ricky l’adolescent (EP)
- Acid Washed - House of Melancholy (Remixed) (EP)

=== 2015 ===
- Turzi - Condor (EP)
- Turzi - C (album)
- Turzi - Colombe (EP)
- Kirin J. Callinan - The Teacher (single)

=== 2016 ===
- Sébastien Tellier - Saint Amour (Original Motion Picture Score) (album)
- Sébastien Tellier - Marie et les naufragés (Original Motion Picture Score) (album)
- Hypnolove - La Piscine (EP)
- Sébastien Tellier - La Ritournelle (EP)
- Scratch Massive - Days out of Days (Original Motion Picture Soundtrack)
- Tristesse Contemporaine - Let’s Go (single)

=== 2017 ===
- Tristesse Contemporaine - Stop and Start (album)
- Mind Gamers - Power of Power (single)
- Sébastien Tellier - A Girl is a Gun (Music from the Original Series) (album)
- John Carroll Kirby - Travel (album)

=== 2018 ===
- Dita Von Teese - Dita Von Teese (album)
- Tristesse Contemporaine - Out of My Dreams (single)
- Cola Boyy - Have You Seen Her (single)
- Cola Boyy - Penny Girl (single)
- Cola Boyy - Buggy Tip (single)
- Dita Von Teese - Dita Von Teese Remix (album)
- Cola Boyy - Black Boogie Neon (EP)
- Cola Boyy - Beige 70 (Domenique Dumont Bilingual Remix) (single)

=== 2019 ===
- Hypnolove - Marbella (EP)
- Hypnolove - Climax (EP)
- Hypnolove - Somebody Else (feat. Cola Boyy) (single)
- Hypnolove - Plexus (album)
- Cola Boyy - All Power to the People (single)

=== 2020 ===
- Sébastien Tellier - Domesticated (album)
- Sébastien Tellier - Simple Mind (album)

=== 2021 ===
- Cola Boyy - To Be Rich Should be A Crime (single)
- Sébastien Tellier - Birthday Boy (single)
- Cola Boyy - Kid Born in Space (single)
- Cola Boyy - Don't Forget Your Neighborhood (single)
- Cola Boyy - Don't Forget Your Neighborhood (nit remix) (single)
- Cola Boyy - Prosthetic Boombox (album)
- Sébastien Tellier - Feels Like Summer (single)

=== 2022 ===
- Kavinsky - Zenith (EP)
- Kavinsky - Renegade (EP)
- Kavinsky - Reborn (album)
- nit - Drawn to Me (EP)
- Kavinsky - Cameo (single)
- nit - Looney Tune (EP)
- Tristesse Contemporaine - Rude! (EP)
- Tristesse Contemporaine - XRaver (single)
- Tristesse Contemporaine - UNITED (album)
- nit - Pazzo (EP)

=== 2023 ===
- Nicolas Godin - Fire Of Love (Music From And Inspired By The Motion Picture) (album)
- Hypnolove - Ghost Carnival (Anniversary Edition) (album)
- nit - Paradoxe (EP)
- Blasé - Mélodie (single)
- nit - Acid Arizona (single)
- Blasé - Number One (single)
- Blasé - Pourquoi Blasé? (EP)
- Blasé - Pourquoi Blasé? (Remixes) (EP)

=== 2024 ===
- nit - Insecure (EP)
- nit - Big Bang Puzzle (album)
- Blasé - Ice Comfortable (EP)
- Blasé - Different Mind (single)

=== 2025 ===
- Blasé - BLABLABLA (album)
- Cola Boyy - Quit to Play Chess (album)
- Blasé - BLABLABLABLA (album)

=== 2026 ===
- Alexander Dexter Jones - Chains (single)
- Turzi Gage - Chevauchée (single)
- Lauritz Kaasa - To Tell You Why (single)
- Turzi Gage - Tripping (The Right Way) (single)
