= Turzi =

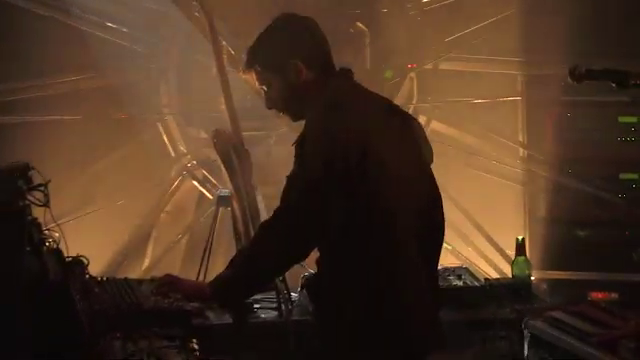
- Romain Turzi under the name of Turzi on January 21, 2017 in Paris, at the Maroquinerie, during a Gonzaï evening.

Background information
- Origin: Versailles, France
- Genres: Rock music, electronica, psychedelic rock, Krautrock, trance music
- Labels: Record Makers

Turzi is a French electronic group formed by Romain Turzi in Versailles. Their track "Afghanistan" appeared on the 2nd Amorphous Androgynous compilation, alongside other acts such as Oasis and Faust. Their 2nd album B featured guest vocals from Primal Scream's Bobby Gillespie on the track "Baltimore". "Baltimore" was featured in two episodes of CSI: Miami (904, 911).

== Discography ==
=== Studio albums ===
Title	Year of release	Label	Notes
A	2007	Record Makers	Released on Kemado Records in the US
B	2009	Record Makers	Features: Bobby Gillespie ("Baltimore"), and Brigitte Fontaine ("Bamako")
C	2015	Record Makers	Features the voice of a soprano singer (Caroline Villain) on several tracks

=== Extended plays ===
Title	Year of release	Label	Notes
Made Under Authority	2006	Record Makers	First release
Seven Inch Allah	2007	Record Makers	From "A" album
Buenos Aires - Bombay	2009	Record Makers	Remixes from Sebastien Tellier, Koudlam, Django Django
Baltimore	2010	Record Makers	Featuring Bobby Gillespie, with remixes from Lovelock, Zombie Zombie, Lynch Mob, Civil Civic
Condor	2015	Record Makers	Remixes from Matias Aguayo, Moodoïd, Zombie Zombie, Turzi Electronique Expérience

=== Solo project ===
Name	Title	Year of release	Label	Notes
Turzi Electronique Expérience	Education	2011	Record Makers	Co-produced by Pilooski
Turzi Electronique Expérience	Connaissance EP	2007	Record Makers	Remixes from Black Strobe, Sahara, Naum Gabo

=== Remixes ===
Year	Artist	Title
2005	Sebastien Tellier	La Ritournelle, Return In Hell by Turzi
2009	Phoenix	Love Like A Sunset
2009	Wolfmother	White Feather
2011	Arnaud Rebotini	The First Thirteen Minutes Of Love
2012	Don Nino	Beats
2013	Kavinsky	Protovision, Turzi Crack Remix
2013	Hypnolove	Come To My Empire, Texas Dream Distortion Remix, by Turzi

=== Live soundtracks ===
Year	Artist	Film
2007	Fritz Lang	Metropolis (1927 film)
2012	Friedrich Wilhelm Murnau	Nosferatu

=== Soundtracks ===
Year	Director	Film
2011	Alexandre Courtès	The Incident
2012	Nicolas Klotz	Low Life
2012	Héléna Klotz	L'Âge atomique
