= Steak (album) =

Steak (Music from the Motion Picture)

Soundtrack album by Sébastien Tellier, Mr Oizo and SebastiAn
- Released: November 3, 2007
- Genres: Electronic, avant-garde, French house
- Length: 38:50
- Labels: Ed Banger; Because Music

Sébastien Tellier chronology
Politics (2004)	Steak (Music from the Motion Picture) (2007)	Sexuality (2008)

Mr. Oizo chronology
Moustache (Half a Scissor) (2005)	Steak (Music from the Motion Picture) (2007)	Lambs Anger (2008)

SebastiAn chronology
Steak (Music from the Motion Picture) (2007)	Total (2011)

Steak: Music From The Motion Picture is a 2007 album by Sébastien Tellier, Mr. Oizo and SebastiAn. It is the soundtrack to the film Steak directed by Quentin Dupieux (Mr. Oizo) starring Eric Judor, Ramzy Bedia, Jonathan Lambert, Vincent Belorgey and Sebastian Akchoté.

== Track listing ==
Adapted from Apple Music

No.	Title	Performer(s)	Length
1.	"Arrival"	SebastiAn	1:05
2.	"Skatesteak"	Mr. Oizo	2:16
3.	"Chivers As A Female"	Sébastien Tellier and Mr. Oizo	2:21
4.	"Chuck"	Mr. Oizo	0:40
5.	"Letrablaise"	SebastiAn	1:03
6.	"Ringardos"	Mr. Oizo	2:17
7.	"Stadium"	Sébastien Tellier	1:45
8.	"Itea"	SebastiAn	2:10
9.	"Plug It"	Sébastien Tellier and Mr. Oizo	2:51
10.	"X Schmidt"	Mr. Oizo	1:11
11.	"Hashis Vers"	Sébastien Tellier and Mr. Oizo	2:06
12.	"Blue Wet Shirt"	Mr. Oizo	0:48
13.	"Victimo"	SebastiAn	1:33
14.	"Top 50"	Sébastien Tellier and Mr. Oizo	2:08
15.	"Exploites"	Sébastien Tellier	3:12
16.	"C.H.I.V.E.R.S"	Mr. Oizo	2:10
17.	"Bonhomme"	Mr. Oizo	2:38
18.	"Toizelle"	Sébastien Tellier and Mr. Oizo	2:17
19.	"Kinder"	SebastiAn	0:53
20.	"Bleue"	Mr. Oizo	2:30
21.	"Construction"	Sébastien Tellier and Mr. Oizo	0:56
Total length:			38:50
