= Cristal d'Acier =

Single by DyE

from the album Taki 183
- B-side: "Neige 606"
- Released: 11 January 2010
- Recorded: 2009
- Length: 4:59
- Label: Tigersushi
- Songwriter(s): Juan de Guillebon
- Producer(s): Juan de Guillebon

DyE singles chronology
"Cristal d'Acier" (2010)	"Fantasy" (2011)

"Cristal d'Acier" is the debut song recorded by French singer-songwriter DyE for his debut studio album, Taki 183 (2011). It was released as the record's first and lead single on 11 January 2010.

== Track listing ==
12" Vinyl single

- A1. "Cristal d'Acier" – 5:01
- A2. "Cristal d'Acier (Logo Remix)" – 4:56
- B1. "Neige 606 (DJ Mehdi Remix)" – 4:41
- B2. "Neige 606 (Society of Silence Remix)" – 6:06

== Release history ==
Region	Date	Format	Label
France	11 January 2010	12"	Tigersushi
