= Teddy Boy (disambiguation) =

Teddy Boy is a subculture.

Teddy Boy may also refer to:

- Teddy Boy (EP), an electro house recording Kavinsky
- "Teddy Boy" (song), a rock song by Paul McCartney
- Teddy boy cut, a hairstyle
- Teddy Boy, a manhua series best known in film adapted form as the Young and Dangerous franchise
- Teddy Boy Blues, a video game by Sega.
- "Teddy Boys", a song recorded by Kelly Willis
