= Narco (film) =

- Theatrical release poster
- Directed by: Tristan Aurouet; Gilles Lellouche
- Written by: Alain Attal (story); Philippe Lefebvre (story); Gilles Lellouche
- Produced by: Alain Attal
- Starring: Guillaume Canet; Zabou Breitman
- Cinematography: Tetsuo Nagata
- Edited by: Samuel Danési; Vincent Montrobert
- Music by: Sébastien Tellier; Sinclair
- Distributed by: Mars Distribution
- Release date: 1 December 2004
- Running time: 105 min.
- Country: France
- Language: French
- Budget: $9 million
- Box office: $4.3 million

Narco is a 2004 French film directed by Tristan Aurouet and Gilles Lellouche and starring Guillaume Canet. The film is about Gus (Canet), a narcoleptic whose life is made difficult by his inability to keep a job because of his condition.

== Plot ==
The main character Gus experiences vivid dreams during his narcoleptic episodes, which inspire him to create comic book style art of extremely high quality. When Samuel Pupkin, the psychiatrist who runs a group attended by Gus, learns of this, he recalls his own desire to be a comic book artist, instead of following the family tradition of psychiatry, a dream prevented by his lack of artistic talent. Motivated by greed, jealousy, and desire for fame he hatches a plot, involving figure skating assassins, to steal Gus's work and pass it off as his own. The attempt on Gus's life fails but he ends up in a coma. Pupkin pays Gus's wife and best friend (who have begun an affair) for the art and sells it to a failed-comedian turned successful publisher, who in turn plans to erase the text and replace it with his own, and in this way have his genius for comedy finally recognized.

When Gus awakens from his coma, he reports to the police that someone is trying to kill him, but as he can think of no reason why, the police dismiss his claims. He then discovers that he is no longer narcoleptic, but finds it convenient to pretend he still is. In this way he discovers the affair of his wife and best friend, and through further investigation the theft of his work. The publisher angry that because of the Pupkin's deception, Gus could cause problems for them, demands that Pupkin solve it. Pupkin once more sends the assassins after Gus, but Gus's best friend, after wrestling with his conscience, talks them out of killing him. The police now believe his story and investigate the publisher who goes to jail, where he finally finds success as a comedian, performing for the other inmates. Pupkin goes insane and is confined to a hospital. Gus reconciles with his wife and finally gets a job.

In a minor role, Jean-Claude Van Damme appears as an imagined version of himself, when one character who idolises him as the ultimate 'Karate man', imagines a conversation where he acts as that character's conscience.

== Cast ==
- Guillaume Canet as Gustave Klopp
- Zabou Breitman as Pamela
- Benoît Poelvoorde as Lenny Bar
- Guillaume Gallienne as Samuel Pupkin
- François Berléand as Guy Bennet
- Jean-Pierre Cassel as Gus's Father
- Vincent Rottiers as Kevin
- Philippe Lellouche as Hervé
- Laurent Lafitte as The Host
- Léa Drucker as The Twin
- Gilles Lellouche as The Twin
- Anne Marivin as The Objects Woman
- Lionel Abelanski as The Supermarket Director
- Philippe Lefebvre as The Gym Teacher
- François Levantal as The Twin's Father
- Jean-Noël Brouté as The Doctor
- Jean-Claude Van Damme as Himself

== Soundtrack ==
All music is composed by Sébastien Tellier.

Narco (original Soundtrack): Bande Originale Du Film
| No. | Title | Length |
|---|---|---|
| 1. | "La ballade du Georges" |
| 2. | "Le démon Pupkin" |
| 3. | "Le château Pupkin" |
| 4. | "Le béguin begins" |
| 5. | "Le long de la rivière tendre" |
| 6. | "Dixi" |
| 7. | "Pam! Exit la folle" |
| 8. | "Georges Thibault Rouhergues" |
| 9. | "Rien de rien par Pupkin" |
| 10. | "Gus gracie" |
| 11. | "Un Narco En été" |
| 12. | "Pupkin et des démons" |
| 13. | "La ritournelle" |
