= Divine (Sébastien Tellier song) =

2008 song by Sébastien Tellier

Single by Sébastien Tellier

from the album Sexuality
- Released: 19 May 2008
- Genre: Synth-pop; electronica
- Length: 4:04
- Songwriter: Sébastien Tellier
- Producers: Guy-Manuel de Homem-Christo; Eric Chédeville

Sébastien Tellier singles chronology
"Broadway" (2006)	"Divine" (2008)	"Roche" (2008)

Music video
- "Divine" on YouTube

Eurovision Song Contest 2008 entry
- Country: France
- Artist: Sébastien Tellier
- Languages: English, French

Finals performance
- Final result: 19th
- Final points: 47

Entry chronology
- ◄ "L'Amour à la française" (2007)
- "Et s'il fallait le faire" (2009) ►

Official performance video
- "Divine" on YouTube

"Divine" is a synth-pop/electronica song by Sébastien Tellier from his 2008 album Sexuality. The song was produced by Guy-Manuel de Homem-Christo and co-produced by Eric Chédeville. The song represented France in the Eurovision Song Contest 2008.

== Background ==
Tellier stated in an interview with Clash, "This is about the old-fashioned, sexual ways of a Californian guy. It’s a tribute to The Beach Boys, but also to the Phantom of the Paradise film by Brian De Palma".

== Eurovision Song Contest 2008 ==
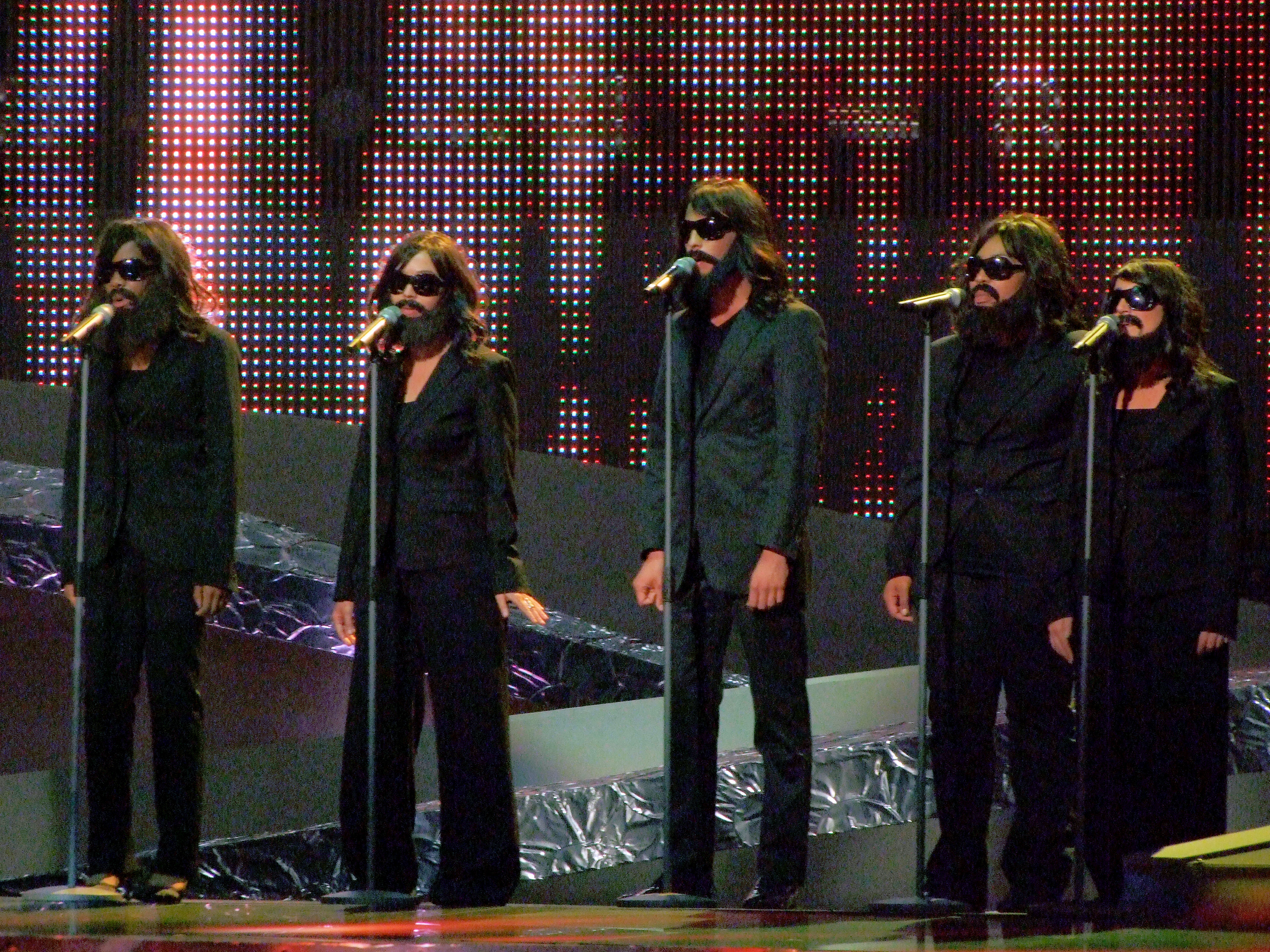
Backup singers for Sébastien Tellier at the Eurovision song contest 2008

The song represented France at the Eurovision Song Contest 2008 with lyrics in English, and a few verses in French. The fact that most of the song was sung in English caused some criticism, and was even brought up in the French parliament. Sébastien Tellier's performance was noted for entering the stage, driving a small golf buggy branded with the French Tricolour, and carrying a helium-filled inflatable globe that he inhaled from. Also, the five backup singers wore sunglasses, wigs, and fake facial hair, to resemble Tellier.

The song automatically qualified for the final of the contest due to France being a member of the Big 4. The final was held on 24 May 2008, where the song was performed 19th in the running order, following the Ukraine's Ani Lorak with "Shady Lady" and preceding Azerbaijan's Elnur and Samir with "Day After Day". It received 47 points, placing 19th in a field of 25.

== Charts ==
=== Weekly charts ===
Chart performance for "Divine"
Chart (2008)	Peak position
Belgium (Ultratop 50 Flanders)	29
Denmark (Tracklisten)	39
Sweden (Sverigetopplistan)	4
UK Singles (Official Charts)	106

=== Year-end charts ===
Chart (2008)	Position
Sweden (Sverigetopplistan)	85
