= Taki 183 (album) =

Studio album by DyE
- Released: June 13, 2011
- Recorded: 2009–11
- Genre: Electropop; electronic rock; techno
- Length: 45:33
- Label: Tigersushi
- Producer: Juan de Guillebon; Joakim Bouaziz

DyE chronology
Imperator (2009)	Taki 183 (2011)	Cocktail Citron (2014)

Singles from Taki 183
- 1. "Cristal d'Acier" Released: January 11, 2010; 2. "Fantasy" Released: January 23, 2011

Taki 183 is the debut album by French musician DyE. It was released on June 13, 2011 by Tigersushi Records. After the release of his debut extended play, Imperator, in 2009, DyE started work on a debut album. Musically influenced by electropop and electronic rock music, the album takes partial influence from techno music and dubstep. The title of the album stemmed from the popularity of "TAKI 183", a tag short for the Greek - American graffiti artist, Dimitrios.

Taki 183 received generally positive reviews from critics upon release, with most favorably comparing the work to several artists, including James Holden, Erol Alkan, and DJ Mehdi. "Fantasy" received favorable reviews although opinions on the music video were divided.

Two singles were released from the album. "Cristal d'Acier", the album's lead single, was released in 2010 and wasn't promoted heavily. The album's second single, "Fantasy", was released in early 2011 and received significant attention after the release of a controversial music video. However, neither of the songs performed well and neglected to peak on any significant record charts.

== Singles ==
"Cristal d'Acier" was released as the album's lead single on January 11, 2010.

"Fantasy" was the second single released from the album on January 23, 2011. The track received significant attention after an animated video for the song with extremely graphic content was released. As of February 26, 2016, the video has garnered over 56 million views.

== Track listing ==
All songs written and produced by Juan de Guillebon, with additional production from Joakim Bouaziz. "Fantasy" has additional lyrics by Guillaume Teyssier.

No.	Title	Length
1.	"Nike"	4:20
2.	"Fantasy"	4:49
3.	"Cristal d'Acier"	4:59
4.	"Vader"	4:53
5.	"Immortals Only"	3:41
6.	"Hole in Ocean"	5:23
7.	"Mattias & Charlotte"	6:12
8.	"Dark White"	1:04
9.	"Taki 183"	6:04
10.	"Star Vac"	4:08
Total length:		45:33

== Release history ==
Region	Date	Label	Ref.
France	June 13, 2011	Tigersushi	
United States	June 13, 2011	Tigersushi	
