= Belorgey =

Belorgey is a French surname. Notable people with the surname include:

- Jean-Michel Belorgey (born 1944), French politician
- Vincent Belorgey alias Kavinsky (1975-2026), French musician, producer, DJ, and actor
