= Orgasmic and Fuzati =

Orgasmic and Fuzati is a French duo project. Refer to

- Orgasmic (producer)
- Fuzati
