= Principles of Geometry =

French electronic music duo

- Origin: Lille, France
- Genres: Electronic
- Years active: 2004–2014, 2019
- Labels: Tigersushi; Discograph; Pandamaki Records
- Members: Guillaume Grosso; Jeremy Duval
- Website: www.principles-of-geometry.com

Principles of Geometry is a French electronic music duo from Lille, northern France, which consists of Guillaume Grosso and Jeremy Duval. The duo draws inspiration from the jingles on the VHS tapes of their childhood, John Carpenter's science fiction films, and the electronic music of British labels Warp and Skam. Principles of Geometry publishes and distributes music with the Parisian label Tigersushi.

== Biography ==
Principles of Geometry debuted in 2005 with the release of a mini-album which was a compilation of their early work. That same year, their eponymous debut album, Principles of Geometry, was released under Tigersushi Records. Le Courrier picard defines it as "a relic of electro for future generations, evoking nostalgia for what it represented for a brief moment. The synthetic and analog music from the duo caught the attention of French singer-songwriter Sébastien Tellier, who provided vocals for the track "A Mountain for President" from the duo's second album Lazare, released in 2007 under Tigersushi and Discograph.

In 2012, they released their third album, Burn the Land and Boil the Oceans. The band toured with drummer Alberto Malo between 2008 and 2010, when they presented a "stereoscopic show" with visual label AntiVJ featuring 3D images. In 2014, the duo released their fourth album, Meanstream. After a five-year hiatus, the duo released a remix of Forever Pavot's song "La Pantoufle" in February 2019.

== Musical style ==
The musical style of Principles of Geometry has been categorized by the specialized press as electronica. Xsilence.net considers the band's musical style to be "a purveyor of nocturnal and ultra-synthetic music, making the best use of visual media to create, even before listening to their music, a strong, powerful atmosphere that invites all the senses to be mobilized."

== Discography ==
=== Albums ===
- Principles Of Geometry (2005, Tigersushi)
- Lazare (2007, Tigersushi)
- Burn the Land and Boil the Oceans (2012, Tigersushi)
- Meanstream (2014, Tigersushi)
- ABCDEFGHIJKLMNOPQRSTUVWXYZ (2022, Tigersushi)

=== Singles, 12" and 7" ===
- A Mountain For President EP (2007, Tigersushi)
- Interstate Highway System (2008, Tigersushi)
- The Effect Of Adding Another Zero (Principles Of Geometry's Distributive & Associative Part One) (2009, Tigersushi/Pandamaki Records)
- P.O.G vs. THE EDITS EP (edits by KRIKOR, PILOOSKI & JOAKIM) (2011, Tigersushi Records)

=== Remixes ===
Year	Artist	Title
2006	Poni Hoax	L.A. Murder Motel (Letom Redrum Remix By Principles of Geometry)
2008	Poni Hoax	The Symbionese Bride (Principles Of Geometry's Poni Hoax's Paper Bride)
2009	Mr. Oizo	Z (Principles of Geometry's Oizo's Z)
2010	Joakim	Ad Me (Principles of Geometry's Joakim's Ad Me)
2012	Chateau Marmont	Wargames (Principles of Geometry's Chateau Marmont's Wargames)
2013	Tahiti Boy and the Palmtree Family	Thank you for the radio (Principles of Geometry's Tahiti Boy's Thank you for the radio)
2013	Egyptology	The Skies (Principles of Geometry's Egyptology's The Skies)
2013	Rone	Let's Go - Feat. High Priest (Principles of Geometry's Rone's Let's Go)
2013	Gyrls	Disruptism (Principles of Geometry's Gyrls' Disruptism)
