= Reborn (Kavinsky album) =

Studio album by Kavinsky
- Released: 25 March 2022
- Studio: Motorbass (Paris)
- Genre: Synthwave
- Length: 47:17
- Labels: Record Makers; Virgin France
- Producers: Kavinsky; Victor le Masne; Gaspard Augé

Kavinsky chronology
Odd Look (EP) (2013)	Reborn (2022)

Singles from Reborn
- 1. "Renegade" Released: 19 November 2021; 2. "Zenith" Released: 4 February 2022; 3. "Cameo" Released: 25 March 2022

Reborn is the second and final studio album by French electronic musician Kavinsky, released on 25 March 2022 by Record Makers through Virgin France. Co-produced alongside Gaspard Augé and Victor le Masne, it contains 12 tracks including collaborations with Romuald, Cautious Clay, Sébastien Tellier, Kareen Lomax, Prudence and Morgan Phalen. The album was preceded by the singles "Renegade" and "Zenith".

== Critical reception ==
Professional ratings
Aggregate scores
Source	Rating
Metacritic	76/100
Review scores
Source	Rating
Beats Per Minute	79%
Clash	8/10
Daily Express	5/5 stars
The Line of Best Fit	8/10
Gigwise	8/10 stars
Loud and Quiet	9/10
NME	3/5 stars

On Metacritic, the album received an aggregate score of 76 out of 100 from five reviews, indicating "generally favorable" reception. Christopher Hamilton-Peach of The Line of Best Fit rated the album eight out of 10 and felt that "summer dancefloor hits carouse with the meticulously mercurial" on the album, summarising it as "a collection that future-proofs Kavinsky's curation of high-end production, addictive earworms and cinematic scope". Writing for Clash, Gem Stokes also gave the album eight out of 10 and called it a "futuristic" mix of synthwave and "youthful, cinematic" influences, concluding that "the album shines bright with promise for [Kavinsky's] futuristic vista".

Ana Leorne of Beats Per Minute opined that Kavinsky's retrofuturism "remains as fresh and relevant as ever" and found its tracks to be "insanely cohesive both in terms of writing and production", although "not as simple variations of a same theme but instead as intricate internal dialogues". Thomas Smith, reviewing the album for NME, wrote that while the album "carries the air of a more relaxed creator", "Trigger" and "Renegade" are "as ambitious and futuristic as anything he's ever done". Giving the album three out of five stars, Smith felt that when Kavinsky "eases up on maximalism, the songs flourish and we see a different side to his production prowess".

== Track listing ==
Reborn track listing
No.	Title	Length
1.	"Pulsar"	3:34
2.	"Reborn" (featuring Romuald)	3:41
3.	"Renegade" (featuring Cautious Clay)	3:18
4.	"Trigger"	3:39
5.	"Goodbye" (featuring Sébastien Tellier)	4:18
6.	"Plasma" (featuring Morgan Phalen)	3:54
7.	"Cameo" (featuring Kareen Lomax)	4:19
8.	"Zenith" (featuring Prudence and Morgan Phalen)	4:41
9.	"Vigilante" (featuring Morgan Phalen)	3:38
10.	"Zombie" (featuring Morgan Phalen)	4:00
11.	"Outsider"	4:39
12.	"Horizon"	3:36
Total length:		47:17

== Personnel ==
Musicians

- Kavinsky – primary artist, producer, writer
- Gaspard Augé – producer (tracks 2, 3, 4 and 11)
- Victor le Masne – producer
- Cautious Clay – vocals (track 3)
- Jade Ly Thai Bach – background vocals (track 5)
- Kareen Lomax – vocals (track 7)
- Morgan Phalen – vocals (track 6, 8, 9, and 10)
- Phoenix – vocoder (track 12)
- Prudence – vocals (track 10)
- Romuald – vocals (track 2)
- Sébastien Tellier – vocals (track 5)
- Adrian Edeline – guitar (track 12)
- Gabriel Malaprade – guitar (track 8)
- Nicolas Bogue – guitar (track 7)
- Adrien Soleiman – saxophone (track 8)
- Corentin Kerdraon – strings (tracks 4, 6, and 11)

Technical

- Antoine Poyeton – engineer, recording
- Louis Bes – assistant engineer, recording
- Michael Declerck – mixing
- Chab – mastering

Artwork

- André Chemetoff – photography
- Thomas Jumin – artwork

== Charts ==
Chart performance for Reborn
Chart (2022)	Peak position
Belgian Albums (Ultratop Flanders)	172
Belgian Albums (Ultratop Wallonia)	20
French Albums (SNEP)	13
German Albums (Offizielle Top 100)	64
Scottish Albums (Official Charts)	56
Swiss Albums (Schweizer Hitparade)	32
UK Dance Albums (Official Charts)	3
UK Album Downloads (Official Charts)	45

== Release history ==
Release history for Reborn
Region	Date	Format	Label	Ref.
France	25 March 2022	CD; LP; download; streaming	Virgin	
United States	25 March 2022	CD; LP; download; streaming	Astralwerks	
