= Fantasy (DyE song) =

Single by DyE

from the album Taki 183
- Released: 10 January 2011
- Recorded: 2010
- Genre: Dream pop; shoegaze
- Length: 4:49
- Label: Tigersushi
- Songwriters: Juan de Guillebon; Guillaume Teyssier
- Producer: Juan de Guillebon

DyE singles chronology
| "Cristal d'Acier" (2010) | "Fantasy" (2011) | "She's Bad" (2014) |

"Fantasy" is a song recorded by French singer-songwriter DyE for his debut studio album, Taki 183 (2011). It was released as the record's second and final single on 10 January 2011. The recording was written and produced by DyE himself, while Guillaume Teyssier served as an additional lyricist.

Since its initial release, the song has been well known due to its accompanying music video. The viral clip features four teenagers sneaking off into a pool house at night before taking part in sexual activities, which transforms two of the friends into alien-like monsters.

== Background and composition ==
"Fantasy" was written and produced by DyE himself, while Guillaume Teyssier served as an additional lyricist. Despite its music video's graphic nature, João Pedro Mechelli from A Gambiarra claimed that the lyrics represented the entire opposite of that and were open for other interpretations.

== Music video ==
An animated accompanying music video for "Fantasy" directed by Jérémie Périn was released on 19 October 2011. The music video, notable for its graphic violence and sexual content, became a viral hit on YouTube; as of February 2022, it was viewed over 66 million times. Ian Gassman ranked the video fourth on his list of "10 More of the Best Animated Music Videos" for Paste, remarking that the video's "very buzzy twist ending makes it pretty hard not to click". Sometime around October 2023, the video was removed from YouTube for violating its policy on nudity or sexual content, but it has since been restored.

=== Synopsis ===
The video begins with four teenagers sneaking into a local pool at night. Two of the teenagers, a boy and a girl, jump into the pool and swim together, leading to the beginning of a sexual encounter between the two of them, while the remaining boy and girl sit by the poolside and watch them. The boy on the poolside tries to make advances on the girl, attempting to kiss her, but rather than reciprocating, she becomes flustered and jumps into the pool with her clothes still on. While underwater, she notices a spasming sensation in her genitals, causing her to panic and resurface in pain. Once she climbs out of the pool, she and the boy discover that their friends have been possessed by worm-like aliens, who attack and kill the boy. The girl manages to escape by jumping back into the pool. She enters another dimension through a portal at the bottom of the pool, whereupon she finds herself facing a giant Lovecraftian creature in the distance. Her eyes subsequently explode out of her skull, killing her.

== Track listings and formats ==
Digital download

1. "Fantasy" – 4:53
2. "Fantasy (Clement Meyer Remix)" – 7:51
3. "Fantasy (Remote Remix)" – 4:53
4. "Fantasy (CFCF Remix)" – 5:06
5. "Nike" (Jackpot Remix) – 5:33
6. "Fantasy" (CFCF Instrumental Remix) – 5:07

Remix EP (Version 1)

1. "Fantasy" – 4:53
2. "Fantasy (CFCF Remix)" – 5:06
3. "Cristal d'Acier (Logo Remix)" – 4:55
4. "Neige 606 (DJ Mehdi Remix)" – 4:37
5. "Fantasy (Radio Edit)" – 3:33
6. "Fantasy (Club Mix)" – 7:02
7. "Fantasy (Club Mix Instrumental)" – 7:02

Remix EP (Version 2)

1. "Fantasy (Club Mix)" – 7:02
2. "Fantasy (Club Mix Instrumental)" – 7:02
3. "Fantasy (Radio Edit)" – 3:33
4. "Fantasy (CFCF Remix)" – 5:06
5. "Neige 606 (DJ Mehdi Remix)" – 4:37
6. "Cristal d'Acier (Logo Remix)" – 4:55

== Release history ==
| Region | Date | Format | Label |
|---|---|---|---|
| France | 10 January 2011 | Digital download | Tigersushi |
| France | 16 October 2011 | Remix EP (256 kbit/s Edition) | Tigersushi |
| France | 17 October 2011 | Remix EP (320 kbit/s Edition) | Tigersushi |
