= Kiss the Beast =

Studio album by Sébastien Tellier
- Released: 30 January 2026
- Length: 44:15
- Label: Because; Horizons
- Producer: Oscar Holter; Victor Le Masne; Sebastian; Daniel Stricker; Sébastien Tellier

Sébastien Tellier chronology
Domesticated (2020)	Kiss the Beast (2026)

Singles from Kiss the Beast
- 1. "Refresh" Released: 3 September 2025; 2. "Naïf de Coeur" Released: 8 October 2025; 3. "Thrill of the Night" Released: 21 November 2025; 4. "Parfum Diamant" Released: 16 January 2026; 5. "Amnesia" Released: 28 January 2026

Professional ratings
Review scores
Source	Rating
AllMusic	3.5/5 stars
Far Out	1.5/5 stars
The Times	4/5 stars

Kiss the Beast is the eighth studio album by French musician Sébastien Tellier. It was released on 30 January 2026 by Because Music and Horizons, and marks his first album in five years, after Domesticated (2020), and his first album with Because Music. The album features guest appearances from Nile Rodgers, Kid Cudi, and Slayyyter, with production handled by Tellier, Oscar Holter, Sebastian, Victor Le Masne, and Daniel Stricker.

== Background and release ==
The lead single from the album, "Refresh", was released on 3 September 2025, which marked his first single in five years after the release of his seventh album, Domesticated (2020). Over a month later, on 8 October, he officially announced his eighth album, titled Kiss the Beast, along with the release of the album's second single, "Naïf de Coeur".

The third single, "Thrill of the Night", was released on 21 November 2025, and features Chic guitarist Nile Rodgers and singer-songwriter Slayyyter. On 6 January 2026, Tellier performed the song "Parfum Diamant" on the Colors YouTube channel, which would then become the fourth single from the album, released on 16 January. The fifth and final single, "Amnesia", which features rapper and singer Kid Cudi, was released on 28 January, two days before the album's release. The album was officially released on 30 January 2026.

In the album's announcement, Tellier states, "This album is the literal description of the music that plays within me. A music crossed by my dualities: the wolf and the sheep, strength and fragility, dream and nightmare. Lost between illusions and truths, my inner life isn’t based on reality, but on a succession of impressions and suppositions." He continues, "I wanted to make an album that felt monumental, maximalist. A record that’s free, instinctive, guided simply by the pleasure of making music."

== Critical reception ==
The album received mixed reviews upon release. In a positive review, Heather Phares of AllMusic says, "Not all of Kiss the Beast's risks pay off, but by letting his creativity run wild, Tellier defies the expectations of anyone who thinks they know his music inside and out." In a more positive review, Will Hodgkinson, Chief Rock and Pop Critic for The Times, admits that "although there is nothing here to match Tellier's 2004 symphonic masterpiece "La Ritournelle", there is a spirit of wide-eyed adventurousness — and a touch of the ridiculous — to it all." In a more negative review, Lauren Hunter of Far Out Magazine says the reason for the low rating is not the "language barrier", but rather "the album feels so haphazard, so bizarre, so deranged that the lack of verbal comprehension becomes the least of your worries."

== Track listing ==
All music is composed by Sébastien Tellier, except "Thrill of the Night" (composed with Amandine de la Richardière) and "Amnesia" (composed with Kid Cudi).

Kiss the Beast track listing
No.	Title	Lyrics	Producer(s)	Length
1.	"Kiss the Beast"	Sébastien Tellier; Amandine de la Richardière	Tellier; Victor Le Masne; Daniel Stricker	3:29
2.	"Naïf de Coeur"	Tellier; De la Richardière	Tellier; Stricker	4:47
3.	"Refresh"	Tellier; De la Richardière	Tellier; Oscar Holter; Sebastian	2:35
4.	"Mouton"	Tellier	Tellier; Le Masne	4:56
5.	"Thrill of the Night" (featuring Slayyyter and Nile Rodgers)	De la Richardière	Tellier; Holter; Sebastian	2:52
6.	"Romantic"	Instrumental	Tellier; Le Masne	3:27
7.	"Parfum Diamant"	Tellier	Tellier; Stricker	4:16
8.	"Copycat"	Tellier	Tellier; Holter; Sebastian	3:04
9.	"Animale"	Tellier	Tellier; Stricker	3:45
10.	"Amnesia" (featuring Kid Cudi)	Tellier; Kid Cudi	Tellier; Sebastian	3:11
11.	"Loup"	Tellier	Tellier; Le Masne; Stricker	4:22
12.	"Un Dimanche en Famille"	Tellier	Tellier; Stricker	3:26
Total length:				44:15

== Personnel ==
Credits adapted from Tidal.

=== Musicians ===
- Sébastien Tellier – lead vocals (tracks 1–4, 6–12), keyboards (1–4, 7–12), background vocals (5)
- Ann-Shirley Ngouassa – background vocals (1, 4, 6, 11)
- Klaar Frankenberg – background vocals (1, 4, 6, 11)
- Laura Etchegoyhen – background vocals (1, 4, 6, 11)
- Laurent Vernerey – bass guitar (1, 4, 6, 11)
- Freddy Sheed – drums (1, 4, 6, 11)
- Paul Cépède – guitar (1, 4, 6, 11)
- Alyssa Monet Harrigan – background vocals (1, 8)
- Joel Bailey – background vocals (1, 8)
- Peace Oluwatobi – background vocals (1, 8)
- Amandine de la Richardière – background vocals (1, 9)
- Byron Spencer – background vocals (2, 7)
- Owen Pallett – strings (3, 4, 6–12)
- Sebastian – keyboards (3, 5), bass guitar (8), arrangement (10)
- Oscar Holter – keyboards (3), guitar (8)
- Corentin Kerdraon – keyboards (4, 5, 8, 10)
- Victor Le Masne – strings (4, 6, 11), arrangement (6, 11), keyboards (6)
- Nile Rodgers – guitar (5)
- Slayyyter – lead vocals (5)
- Daniel Stricker – drums (7, 9, 10, 12)
- David Numwami – background vocals (8)
- Maxime Daoud – bass guitar, keyboards (9, 12); bells (9)
- Artem Naumenko – flute (9)
- Adélaïde Songeons – trombone (9)
- Kid Cudi – lead vocals (10)
- Kostia Bourreau – French horn (11)

=== Technical ===
- Ricky Damian – engineering (1, 4–6, 8, 11)
- Antoine Poyeton – engineering (2, 3, 7, 8)
- Bastien Doremus – engineering (3, 5, 8–10)
- David Mestre – engineering (5)
- Louis Bes – engineering (7, 9, 12), engineering assistance (1–4, 6, 8, 11)
- Louise Bouget – engineering assistance (1–4, 6–9, 11, 12)
- Federica Cottone – engineering assistance (1, 2, 8)
- Tom Elmhirst – mixing
- Chris Gehringer – mastering

== Charts ==
Chart performance for Kiss the Beast
Chart (2026)	Peak position
Belgian Albums (Ultratop Wallonia)	81
French Albums (SNEP)	42
Swiss Albums (Schweizer Hitparade)	86
UK Independent Albums (OCC)	49
UK Record Store (OCC)	17
