= Domesticated (Sébastien Tellier album) =

Studio album by Sébastien Tellier
- Released: 29 May 2020
- Length: 32:03
- Label: Record Makers
- Producer: nit; Jam City; Mind Gamers; Philippe Zdar; Varnish La Piscine

Sébastien Tellier chronology
L'Aventura (2014)	Domesticated (2020)	Kiss the Beast (2026)

Singles from Domesticated
- 1. "A Ballet" Released: 29 January 2020; 2. "Domestic Tasks" Released: 8 April 2020; 3. "Stuck in a Summer Love" Released: 19 May 2020

Professional ratings
Aggregate scores
Source	Rating
Metacritic	65/100
Review scores
Source	Rating
AllMusic	3.5/5 stars
DIY	2.5/5 stars
MusicOMH	4/5 stars
Pitchfork	6/10

Domesticated is the seventh studio album by French musician Sébastien Tellier. It was released on 29 May 2020 under Record Makers.

The album was originally scheduled for release at the end of April 2020, but got pushed back to 29 May 2020 due to COVID-19.

== Critical reception ==
Domesticated was met with generally favorable reviews from critics. At Metacritic, which assigns a weighted average rating out of 100 to reviews from mainstream publications, this release received an average score of 65, based on 6 reviews.

== Track listing ==
All tracks written and composed by Sébastien Tellier.

Domesticated track listing
No.	Title	Producer(s)	Length
1.	"A Ballet"	Jam City; nit^{[a]}	4:46
2.	"Stuck in a Summer Love"	nit	4:16
3.	"Venezia"	Philippe Zdar; Varnish La Piscine; nit	3:13
4.	"Domestic Tasks"	Mind Gamers; nit^{[a]}	5:25
5.	"Oui"	nit	3:59
6.	"Atomic Smile"	Mind Gamers	3:08
7.	"Hazy Feelings"	Varnish La Piscine; nit	3:24
8.	"Won"	Jam City; nit^{[a]}	3:51
Total length:			32:03

Notes

- ^{^[a]} signifies an additional producer

== Personnel ==
- Sébastien Tellier – primary artist, vocals (all), composer (all)
- Nk.F – mastering (all)
- Corentin "nit" Kerdraon – producer (2–3, 5, 7), additional producer (1, 4, 8), guitar (7), strings (6)
- Varnish La Piscine – producer (3, 7), additional vocals (3)
- Jam City – producer (1, 8)
- Mind Gamers – producer (4, 6)
- Daniel Stricker – drums (2, 5)
- Philippe Zdar – producer (3)

== Charts ==
Chart performance for Domesticated
Chart (2020)	Peak position
Belgian Albums (Ultratop Wallonia)	93
French Albums (SNEP)	117
Swiss Albums (Schweizer Hitparade)	85
