= Confection (Sébastien Tellier album) =

Studio album by Sébastien Tellier
- Released: 14 October 2013
- Genre: Ambient; electronic; synth-pop
- Length: 34:34
- Label: Record Makers

Sébastien Tellier chronology
My God Is Blue (2012)	Confection (2013)	L'Aventura (2014)

Singles from Confection
- 1. "L'amour naissant" Released: 24 September 2013

Professional ratings
Aggregate scores
Source	Rating
AnyDecentMusic?	6.5/10
Metacritic	68/100
Review scores
Source	Rating
AllMusic	4/5 stars
Clash	9/10
DIY	3/5 stars
MusicOMH	3/5 stars
NME	3/5 stars
Pitchfork	6.3/10
The Line of Best Fit	8/10

Confection is the fifth studio album by French musician Sébastien Tellier, released on 14 October 2013 by Record Makers.

== Background ==
Confection was partially inspired by the death of Tellier's grandmother. Some of the music on the album was intended to appear on a film soundtrack, but ended up not being used. In an interview with artistxite, Tellier noted: "You can say my grandmother's death as well as this nonexisting soundtrack had an impact on "Confection". To me this has been a super strange situation. I was full of love for my grandmother and full of dedication to this soundtrack; Confection is the result of both of these emotional conditions."

Unlike Tellier's previous albums, Confection is a mostly instrumental album, with Tellier saying he conceived it as a film soundtrack.

== Critical reception ==
Confection was met with generally favorable reviews from critics. At Metacritic, which assigns a weighted average rating out of 100 to reviews from mainstream publications, this release received an average score of 68, based on 12 reviews.

== Track listing ==
Confection track listing
No.	Title	Length
1.	"Adieu"	2:51
2.	"Coco"	2:51
3.	"L'amour naissant"	3:55
4.	"Adieu mes amours"	1:47
5.	"Hypnose"	4:00
6.	"Waltz"	2:21
7.	"Adieu comme un jeu"	1:07
8.	"Delta romantica"	2:17
9.	"Curiosa"	1:15
10.	"L'amour naissant II"	1:23
11.	"Coco et le labyrinthe"	2:52
12.	"L'amour naissant III"	4:34
13.	"Curiosa II"	1:05
14.	"Le delta des mmours"	2:16
Total length:		34:34

== Personnel ==
- Sébastien Tellier – vocals (3), piano, guitar, drums, bass, composer, producer
- Urszula Cuvellier – vocals (1)
- Thomas Naïm – guitar
- Tony Allen – drums
- Emmanuel D'Orlando – piano, arrangement
- Macedonian Radio Symphonic Orchestra – horns, strings
- Oleg Kondratenko – conductor
- Georgi Hristovski – engineering
- Bastien Vandevelde – mixing
- Julien Torb – mixing
- Philippe Zdar – mixing
- Boban Apostolov – mixing
- Mrzyk & Moriceau – artwork
- Jean-Baptiste Mondino – photography
- Graphame – design

== Charts ==
Chart performance for Confection
Chart (2013)	Peak position
Belgian Albums (Ultratop Flanders)	179
Belgian Albums (Ultratop Wallonia)	69
French Albums (SNEP)	52
