= My God Is Blue =

Studio album by Sébastien Tellier
- Released: 23 April 2012
- Genre: Electronic
- Length: 46:29
- Label: Record Makers
- Producer: Mr. Flash; Pavle Kovacevic

Sébastien Tellier chronology
Sexuality (2008)	My God Is Blue (2012)	Confection (2013)

Singles from My God Is Blue
- 1. "Pépito bleu" Released: 16 January 2012; 2. "Cochon Ville" Released: 7 March 2012; 3. "Russian Attractions" Released: 26 June 2012

Professional ratings
Aggregate scores
Source	Rating
AnyDecentMusic?	6.9/10
Metacritic	64/100
Review scores
Source	Rating
Exclaim!	7/10
Mixmag	4/5 stars
MusicOMH	4.5/5 stars
NME	3.5/5 stars
Pitchfork	7.1/10
Uncut	8/10

My God Is Blue is the fourth studio album and a concept album by French musician Sébastien Tellier, released on 23 April 2012 by Record Makers.

== Release ==
On 12 January 2012, Tellier announced he was releasing his fourth studio album, with producers Mr. Flash and Pavle Kovacevic. Of the release, Tellier said:

"Do not listen to my record, listen to my message, enter into vibration with my music, merge our dreams, all that energy propagate in a community enormous blue wave that radiate around the world, and the truth will emerge."

=== Singles ===
The first single "Pepito Bleu" was released on 17 January 2012. The music video was directed by Sanghon Kim and Mathieu Tonetti.

On 15 March 2012, the second single "Cochon Ville" was released, and featured remixes by Belgian DJ The Magician and Dimitri From Paris.

The third track from My God Is Blue was "Russian Attractions", released on 26 June 2012.

== Critical reception ==
My God Is Blue was met with "generally favorable" reviews from critics. At Metacritic, which assigns a weighted average rating out of 100 to reviews from mainstream publications, this release received an average score of 64 based on 12 reviews. Aggregate website AnyDecentMusic? gave the release a 6.9 out of 10 based on a critical consensus of 7 reviews.

At MusicOMH, Ben Hogwood wrote: "Tellier gives us effortless, slinky disco, fiery organ toccatas and exuberant guitar solos, and lovelorn poems. Characteristically he expresses himself through often cryptic lyrics, which are sometimes hard to hear as his voice gets lower in the mix when set against an orchestra, but the sentiment still shines through." Writing for Uncut, Garry Mullholland said: "Whether hiding in shame or just waiting until his fans had forgotten, it's been four years well spent, because My God Is Blue is his best album yet." In a review for Exclaim!, writer Daniel Sylvester explained: "On his fourth LP, the fittingly titled My God is Blue, Tellier doesn't just sing over his electro-baroque beats, he treats them like true duet partners, allowing rhythms to pulse and swell while responding with an equally effervescent speak-sing."

== Track listing ==
All tracks arranged by Sébastien Tellier, Mr. Flash and Pavle Kovacevic; produced by Mr. Flash and Pavle Kovacevic and composed by Sébastien Tellier except where noted.

My God Is Blue track listing
No.	Title	Writer(s)	Length
1.	"Pépito bleu"		2:48
2.	"The Colour of Your Mind"		5:04
3.	"Sedulous"		4:23
4.	"Cochon ville"		3:09
5.	"Magical Hurricane"		4:31
6.	"Russian Attractions"		2:57
7.	"Mayday"		3:32
8.	"Draw Your World"		1:54
9.	"My Poseidon"	Sébastien Tellier; Guy-Manuel de Homem-Christo	4:31
10.	"Against the Law"		4:48
11.	"My God Is Blue"		3:07
12.	"Yes, It's Possible"		5:41
Total length:			46:29

== Personnel ==
- Mr. Flash – producer (all), arranger (all), recording arranger (all), drums (1–4, 6, 8–12), synthesizer (7, 8, 11, 12), flute (1–4, 6, 8–12), cymbals (6), additional vocals (7)
- Pavle Kovacevic – producer (all), additional producer (all), recording engineer (all), recording arranger (all), arranger (all), work arranger (all), programmer (all), conductor (1, 3, 5–6, 9), synthesizer (all), piano (1, 5, 8, 11), organ (3, 6, 12), glass harmonica (5), additional vocals (7)
- Chab – mastering engineer (all)
- Guy-Manuel de Homem-Christo – composer (9)
- Nicolas Dufournet – vocal arranger (1–7, 9–10, 12)
- Rémi Barbot – recording engineer (all)
- Thomas Naïm – electric bass (3, 7, 9, 11), electric guitar (3, 9, 10, 12), acoustic guitar (5)
- The Alliance Bleue Ensemble – choir (1, 5, 6), ensemble (1, 3, 5, 6, 9)
- David Mestre – recording engineer (3, 7, 12)
- Bogue – electric bass (4), electric guitar (4, 8)
- Kirby – piano (3, 9)
- Yann Martin – horn (3)
- Simon Andrieux – horn (3)
- Laura Cortes – additional vocals (4)

== Charts ==
Chart performance for My God Is Blue
Chart (2012)	Peak position
Belgian Albums (Ultratop Flanders)	95
Belgian Albums (Ultratop Wallonia)	31
French Albums (SNEP)	17
