= L'Aventura =

Studio album by Sébastien Tellier
- Released: 17 July 2014
- Genre: Electronic; synth-pop
- Length: 53:26
- Label: Record Makers

Sébastien Tellier chronology
Confection (2013)	L'Aventura (2014)	Domesticated (2020)

Singles from L'Aventura
- 1. "Aller vers le soleil" Released: 26 May 2014; 2. "Ricky l'adolescent" Released: 26 May 2014

Professional ratings
Aggregate scores
Source	Rating
Metacritic	70/100
Review scores
Source	Rating
AllMusic	3.5/5 stars
MusicOMH	4/5 stars
NME	4/5 stars
Pitchfork	7.4/10
The Guardian	3/5 stars
The Line of Best Fit	8/10
The Music	4.5/5 stars

L'Aventura (English: The Adventure) is the sixth studio album by French musician Sébastien Tellier, released on 17 July 2014 by Record Makers.

== Background ==
The album was inspired by Tellier's childhood and Brazil, where the video to one of its songs, "L'adulte" (English: "The Adult"), is set in. Tellier states: "For this album, I wanted to rewrite my childhood. I chose to set this adventure in Brazil, a country of splendor and joy with an eternally childlike soul." The album was recorded during the promotion period for Tellier's previous album Confection in the studios of Arthur Verocai, Jean-Michel Jarre, and Philippe Zdar.

The album, consisting of ten tracks, is sung entirely in French.

== Critical reception ==
L'Aventura was met with generally favorable reviews from critics. At Metacritic, which assigns a weighted average rating out of 100 to reviews from mainstream publications, this release received an average score of 70, based on 10 reviews.

== Track listing ==
L'Aventura track listing
No.	Title	Length
1.	"Love"	4:27
2.	"Sous les rayons du soleil"	3:32
3.	"Ma Calypso"	5:16
4.	"L'adulte"	3:19
5.	"Ricky l'adolescent"	5:05
6.	"Aller vers le soleil"	5:29
7.	"Comment revoir Oursinet?"	14:12
8.	"L'amour carnaval"	2:57
9.	"Ambiance Rio"	4:32
10.	"L'enfant vert"	4:37
Total length:		53:26

== Personnel ==
- Sébastien Tellier – vocals, guitar, bass, composer, producer
- Daira Saboia – backing vocals
- Jurema de Cândia – backing vocals
- John Carroll Kirby – keyboards
- Johan Holmegard – drums
- Robertinho Silva – percussion
- Daniel Garcia – tenor saxophone, flute
- Dirceu Leite – flute
- Ana Catto – violin
- Ana de Oliveira – violin
- Andre Cunha – violin
- Her Agapito – violin
- Karolin Rosalie Broosch – violin
- Marco Catto – violin
- Pedro Mibielli – violin
- Priscila Rato – violin
- Déborah Cheyne – viola
- Eduardo Pereira – viola
- David Chew – cello
- Marcus Ribeiro – cello
- Arthur Verocai – arrangement, conductor
- David Mestre – engineering
- Mike Marsh – mastering
- Philippe Zdar – mixing
- Bastien Vandevelde – mixing
- Julien Torb – mixing

== Charts ==
Chart performance for L'Aventura
Chart (2014)	Peak position
Belgian Albums (Ultratop Flanders)	200
Belgian Albums (Ultratop Wallonia)	54
French Albums (SNEP)	53
