= OutRun (album) =

2013 studio album by Kavinsky

Studio album by Kavinsky
- Released: 22 February 2013
- Recorded: 2006–2012
- Studios: Gang (Paris) (Note: Engineering on track 8); CBE (Paris) (Note: Track 11); Third Side (Paris) (Note: Backing vocals on track 11)
- Genres: Electronic; French house; synthwave
- Length: 44:26
- Labels: Record Makers; Vertigo; Mercury
- Producers: Kavinsky; Sebastian; Guy-Manuel de Homem-Christo

Kavinsky chronology
ProtoVision (EP) (2013)	OutRun (2013)	Odd Look (EP) (2013)

Singles from OutRun
- 1. "ProtoVision" Released: 10 December 2012

OutRun is the debut studio album by French electronic musician Kavinsky, released on 22 February 2013 by Record Makers, Vertigo Records and Mercury Records. Production for the album was handled primarily by Kavinsky, along with close friend and fellow French electro house artist Sebastian. The album is named after Sega's 1986 arcade game of the same name, which featured the Ferrari Testarossa.

The concept behind OutRun follows Kavinsky's backstory of a young man who crashed his Testarossa in 1986 and reappeared in 2006 as a zombie who produces electronic music. Kavinsky cites influences from 1980s video games, television cop shows such as Miami Vice, and the films of Dario Argento. The visual style and plot are reminiscent of cult film The Wraith, a 1986 B-movie about an undead teenager who fuses with his car.

== Singles ==
"ProtoVision" was released on 10 December 2012 as the album's official lead single. The music video, directed by Marcus Herring, was released on 7 December 2012 on Vimeo and on 10 December 2012 on YouTube.

== Usage in media ==
A one-minute snippet of the song "Odd Look" was used in a 2012 French commercial for BMW i, which was shown in cinemas. "Nightcall" plays during the opening credits of the 2011 film Drive. "Roadgame" has been used by Mercedes-Benz in a 2012 French commercial and in 2015 for the Italian commercial of the CLA Shooting Brake. It was also used when Manchester City players and their staff arrives at the City of Manchester Stadium from their bus during their home matches. In a British 2021 TV commercial for Gusto pre-prepared food ingredient boxes, a short clip of "Rampage" was used as an example of 80's electronica.

== Critical reception ==
Professional ratings
Aggregate scores
Source	Rating
Metacritic	75/100
Review scores
Source	Rating
AllMusic	3.5/5 stars
Consequence of Sound	3.5/5 stars
Drowned in Sound	6/10
The Independent	4/5 stars
Mixmag	4/5
NME	8/10
Pitchfork	6.3/10
PopMatters	8/10
Spin	8/10

OutRun received generally positive reviews from music critics. At Metacritic, which assigns a normalised rating out of 100 to reviews from mainstream publications, the album received an average score of 75, based on 12 reviews.

== Track listing ==
No.	Title	Lyrics	Music	Producer(s)	Length
1.	"Prelude"	Kavinsky; Paul Hahn	Kavinsky	Kavinsky; Sebastian	1:54
2.	"Blizzard"		Kavinsky; Sebastian	Sebastian	3:27
3.	"ProtoVision"		Kavinsky; Sebastian	Kavinsky; Sebastian	3:26
4.	"Odd Look" (featuring Sebastian)		Kavinsky; Sebastian	Sebastian	4:49
5.	"Rampage"		Kavinsky; Sebastian	Sebastian	2:55
6.	"Suburbia" (featuring Havoc)	Havoc	Kavinsky	Kavinsky; Sebastian	3:28
7.	"Testarossa Autodrive"		Kavinsky	Kavinsky	3:37
8.	"Nightcall" (featuring Lovefoxxx)	Kavinsky; Guy-Manuel de Homem-Christo	Kavinsky; Homem-Christo	Kavinsky; Homem-Christo	4:18
9.	"Deadcruiser"		Kavinsky	Kavinsky	3:33
10.	"Grand Canyon"		Kavinsky; Sebastian	Kavinsky; Sebastian	3:12
11.	"First Blood" (featuring Tyson)	T. Tyson; José Reis Fontão	Kavinsky; Sebastian	Kavinsky; Sebastian	3:04
12.	"Roadgame"		Kavinsky; Sebastian	Kavinsky; Sebastian	3:44
13.	"Endless"	Kavinsky; Hahn	Kavinsky	Kavinsky	2:59

iTunes Store US bonus track
No.	Title	Length
14.	"ProtoVision" (Red Sky Mix featuring Sugar Tongue Slim)	3:02

== Personnel ==
Credits adapted from the liner notes of OutRun.

=== Musicians ===
- Kavinsky – vocals (tracks 4, 8, 12)
- Paul Hahn – voice (tracks 1, 13)
- Raw Man – guitars (tracks 2, 3, 11)
- Sebastian – vocals (track 4)
- Havoc – vocals (track 6)
- Lovefoxxx – vocals (track 8)
- Tyson – vocals (track 11)
- José Reis Fontão – backing vocals (track 11)

=== Technical ===
- Kavinsky – production (tracks 1, 3, 6–12)
- Sebastian – production (tracks 1–6, 10–12); mixing (all tracks)
- A-Trak – recording (track 6)
- Guy-Manuel de Homem-Christo – production (track 8)
- Florian Lagatta – engineering (track 8)
- David Mestre – recording (track 11)

=== Artwork ===
- The Directors Bureau Special Projects – album art concept, photography
- Marcus Herring – director
- Tari Segal – director of photography
- Benjamin Glovitz – production
- Duffy Culligan – executive production
- Charlotte Delarue – art direction
- Adrien Blanchat – image manipulation
- Graphame – layout

== Charts ==
=== Weekly charts ===
Weekly chart performance for OutRun
Chart (2013)	Peak position
Belgian Albums (Ultratop Flanders)	37
Belgian Albums (Ultratop Wallonia)	28
French Albums (SNEP)	2
Swiss Albums (Schweizer Hitparade)	38
UK Albums (Official Charts)	159
UK Dance Albums (Official Charts)	8
US Billboard 200	156
US Top Dance Albums (Billboard)	5

=== Year-end charts ===
Year-end chart performance for OutRun
Chart (2013)	Position
Belgian Albums (Ultratop Wallonia)	185
French Albums (SNEP)	68

== Certifications ==
Certifications for OutRun
Region	Certification	Certified units/sales
France (SNEP)	Gold	50,000^{*}
^{*} Sales figures based on certification alone.

== Release history ==
Release history for OutRun
Region	Date	Label	Ref.
Germany	22 February 2013	Mercury	
Ireland	22 February 2013	Record Makers; Vertigo; Mercury	
France	25 February 2013	Record Makers; Vertigo; Mercury	
United Kingdom	25 February 2013	Record Makers; Vertigo; Mercury	
United States	26 February 2013	Casablanca; Republic	
Australia	1 March 2013	Universal	
Italy	12 March 2013	Universal	
