= Dita Von Teese (album) =

Studio album by Dita Von Teese
- Released: February 16, 2018
- Recorded: 2017
- Studios: Kingsize Soundlabs (Silver Lake, California); Ningadoo and Hanging Tree (Sydney, Australia)
- Genres: Electronica; psychedelic pop
- Length: 38:52
- Languages: English; French
- Label: Record Makers
- Producers: Mind Gamers; Pierre Rousseau

Singles from Dita Von Teese
- 1. "Rendez-vous" Released: November 28, 2017

Professional ratings
Review scores
Source	Rating
AllMusic	4/5 stars
The Times	2/5 stars

Dita Von Teese is the debut studio album by American entertainer Dita Von Teese. It was released on February 16, 2018, by Record Makers. The album charted in Belgium and France. A companion remix album, titled Dita Von Teese Remix, was released digitally on August 31, 2018.

== Track listing ==
All tracks are written by Sébastien Tellier, except where noted.

No.	Title	Lyrics	Length
1.	"Sparkling Rain"	Amandine de la Richardière	3:26
2.	"Rendez-vous"	Richardière	3:46
3.	"La vie est un jeu"		4:34
4.	"My Lips on Your Lips"		4:39
5.	"Bird of Prey"		2:57
6.	"Parfum"		3:46
7.	"Fevers and Candies"		3:54
8.	"Saticula"		3:43
9.	"Dangerous Guy"	Tellier; Richardière	4:24
10.	"Porcelaine"		3:41
Total length:			38:52

== Personnel ==
Credits adapted from the liner notes of Dita Von Teese.

=== Musicians ===
- Dita Von Teese – vocals
- John Kirby – keyboards
- Daniel Stricker – beats, drums
- Smokey Hormel – guitar (track 3)
- Sébastien Tellier – guitar (track 4)
- Chris Taylor – woodwind (tracks 3, 8)
- Molly Lewis – whistling (track 3)
- Nedelle Torrisi – backing vocals
- Amber Quintero – backing vocals
- Skylar Kaplan – backing vocals
- Piper Kaplan – backing vocals

=== Technical ===
- Mind Gamers – production (tracks 2–10)
- Pierre Rousseau – production (track 1)
- Nicolas Godin – additional production (track 4)
- Eric Gorman – engineering
- David Mestre – additional vocal production
- Timothy Dunn – live drums engineering, bass engineering
- Julien Delfaud – mixing
- Guillaume Jay – mixing assistance
- Alex Gopher – mastering

=== Artwork ===
- Camille Vivier – photography
- Laurent Fétis – artwork

== Charts ==
Chart performance for Dita Von Teese
Chart (2018)	Peak position
Belgian Albums (Ultratop Wallonia)	140
French Albums (SNEP)	142
