= L'incroyable Vérité =

Studio album by Sébastien Tellier
- Released: 12 June 2001
- Genre: Chamber pop; indie rock
- Length: 41:06
- Label: Record Makers; Astralwerks
- Producer: Sébastien Tellier

Sébastien Tellier chronology
L'incroyable Vérité (2001)	Politics (2004)

Professional ratings
Review scores
Source	Rating
AllMusic	2.5/5 stars
laut.de	5/5 stars
NME	4/5 stars
Pitchfork	3.8/10

L'incroyable Vérité (English: The Incredible Truth) is the debut album by French musician Sébastien Tellier. It was released on 12 June 2001 via Record Makers. The music was written by Tellier with lyrics by Mathieu Tonetti and Tellier. With material from the album, Tellier joined the band Air in their United States tour in the summer of 2001. The song "Fantino" appears in 2003 film Lost in Translation and the song "Universe" is featured in 2006 film Daft Punk's Electroma. The album received favorable reviews upon release.

L'incroyable Vérité is a pop album featuring styles from lo-fi electronica to bizarre cabaret tunes. Its sleeve featured Tellier in full evening dress on the front, while the back of jacket had a shot of him cavorting in a playboy's pool. He instructed listeners only to listen to the album by candlelight.

== Track listing ==
All tracks are written by Sébastien Tellier, except tracks 3 and 8 written with Mathieu Tonetti.

No.	Title	Length
1.	"Oh malheur Chez O'Malley"	4:42
2.	"Kazoo III"	3:50
3.	"Universe"	5:06
4.	"L'enfance d'un chien"	4:16
5.	"Une vie de papa"	3:59
6.	"Fin chien"	1:44
7.	"Grec"	1:14
8.	"Kissed by You"	4:58
9.	"Fantino"	3:11
10.	"Triologie femme (vierges, une vraie maman, face au miroir)"	4:31
11.	"Black Douleur"	3:35
Total length:		41:06

== Personnel ==
- Sébastien Tellier – songwriter, producer, mixing
- Mathieu Tonetti – lyrics (tracks: 3, 8)
- Guillaume Le Braz – mixing
- Quentin "Mr. Oizo" Dupieux – mixing
- Christophe Saudemont – engineering
- Frank Redlich – engineering
- Julien Marty – engineering
- Willy Huvey – photography
- Jean-Michel Tixier – design
- Marc Teissier du Cros – A&R
- Stéphane Elfassi – A&R
