= Dopplereffekt =

American electronic music band

Dopplereffekt (German for 'Doppler effect') is an electronic music act from Detroit which has been active since 1995, and whose main member is producer/artist Gerald Donald (also one half of the band Drexciya with James Stinson). Another member is To Nhan Le Thi. The group released a compilation album, Gesamtkunstwerk, in 1999, and were inactive until 2003; since then numerous albums have been released.

While the musical style and the act's image changed radically during a non-release period from 1999 to 2003, two steady characteristics are the display of a thematic affiliation with science and the obvious use of pseudonyms and the hence rumored but unconfirmed identities of the members.

The group also has political influences, with the cover of Gesamtkunstwerk featuring a white hammer and sickle on a black background. In an interview, Gerald Donald stated that the album cover was intended to pay homage to socialism as an ideal political concept in theory.

The act has played gigs regularly across the globe. They perform live using two Korg Triton workstations.

== Discography ==
- Cellular Phone 7" - Dataphysix MDX2 (1995)
- Fascist State LP - Dataphysix DX001 (1995)
- Infophysix LP - Dataphysix DX002 (1996)
- Sterilization 12" - Dataphysix DX003 (1997)
- Gesamtkunstwerk 2x12" + 7"/ CD - International Deejay Gigolo Records (1999; compilation of all previous releases plus one new track)
- Scientist Mixes 10"/ 12" - International Deejay Gigolo Records
- Myon-Neutrino/ Z-Boson (12") International Deejay Gigolo Records
- Linear Accelerator 2x12"/ CD - International Deejay Gigolo Records (2003)
- Calabi-Yau Space 2x12"/ CD - Rephlex (2007)
- Tetrahymena EP 12"/ CD - Leisure System LSR007 (2013)
- Hypnagogia 12" - Leisure System LSR012 (2014), with Objekt (TJ Hertz)
- Cellular Automata LP - Leisure System LSR020 (2017)
- Athanatos EP - Leisure System LSR022 (2018)
- Neurotelepathy LP - Leisure System (2022)
- Infinite Tetraspace EP - Curtis Electronix (2024)
- Metasymmetry 12" EP - Tresor Records (2025)
