= Sexuality (album) =

Studio album by Sébastien Tellier
- Released: 25 February 2008
- Genre: Synth-pop
- Length: 50:25
- Label: Record Makers; Lucky Number
- Producer: Guy-Manuel de Homem-Christo; Eric Chédeville^{[c]}

Sébastien Tellier chronology
Politics (2004)	Sexuality (2008)	My God Is Blue (2012)

Alternative cover

Professional ratings
Review scores
Source	Rating
AllMusic	3/5 stars
Drowned in Sound	6/10
The Guardian	4/5 stars
NME	8/10
Pitchfork	7.3/10

Sexuality is the third studio album by French singer Sébastien Tellier, released on 25 February 2008 by Record Makers and Lucky Number Music. The album was produced by Guy-Manuel de Homem-Christo, who is best known as one of the members of Daft Punk.

== Background ==
Sexuality is the first studio album by Tellier produced by someone other than himself. When de Homem-Christo was asked to produce the album, he was flattered and immediately agreed to do it. He expressed that Tellier "is maybe the best singer and composer in France today" and felt that the album was one of the few collaborative efforts in which he could contribute significantly and uniquely. "If you feel it and if you feel something creatively interesting then it’s possible." Their previous professional meeting was during the production period of the film Daft Punk's Electroma, in which Daft Punk requested the use of Tellier's song "Universe".

The first "taster" from the album was "Sexual Sportswear", which was revealed on Tellier's Myspace page. He described the instrumental track as "a direct combination of what I was doing before and what Guy-Man can do." When questioned on the two seemingly strangely juxtaposed words in the title, Tellier replied: "In my own sexual fantasies I always think about women in sportswear. I like women in sports pants and prefer peeling them off women to lifting up their skirts."

Regarding the style of the album, Tellier stated, "It is not at all like what I have released before and nothing like what Guy-Man did with Daft Punk." He also elaborated that, "It's very electronic and like intellectual R&B, although not in the same way that Beyoncé or Justin Timberlake are R&B." Tellier also stated "I wanted to make music that would sexually excite people in an Italian or Latin sense of sexual music; the big seducer with the broken heart... I tried to keep vulgarity away from sex and my music." The song "Divine" from the album represented France at the Eurovision Song Contest 2008.

== Track listing ==
Adapted from Qobuz.

All tracks written by Sébastien Tellier; produced by Sébastien Tellier and Guy-Manuel de Homem-Christo; co-produced by Eric Chédeville except where noted.

No.	Title	Writer(s)	Producer(s)	Length
1.	"Roche"			5:01
2.	"Kilometer"	Sébastien Tellier; Guy-Manuel de Homem-Christo	Guy-Manuel de Homem-Christo; Romain Tranchart^{[a]}	4:18
3.	"Look"			4:34
4.	"Divine"			3:08
5.	"Pomme"			3:31
6.	"Une heure"			3:51
7.	"Sexual Sportswear"			7:17
8.	"Elle"	Tellier; de Homem-Christo	de Homem-Christo; Tranchart^{[a]}	4:37
9.	"Fingers of Steel"			5:15
10.	"Manty"			3:31
11.	"L'amour et la violence"			5:22
Total length:				50:25

Notes

- ^{^[a]} signifies an additional producer
- ^{^[c]} signifies a co-producer

== Personnel ==
- Romain Tranchart – engineer
- Guy-Manuel de Homem-Christo – producer
- Eric Chédeville – co-producer
- Manu Cossu – artwork
- Olivia Jourde – artwork layout

== Charts ==
Chart performance for Sexuality
Chart (2008)	Peak position
French Albums (SNEP)	33
Swedish Albums (Sverigetopplistan)	43
UK Dance Albums (OCC)	6
UK Independent Albums (OCC)	11
