= Poni Hoax =

French band

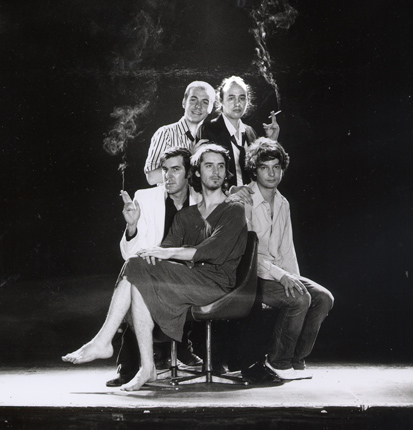
- Poni Hoax in 2011

Background information
- Origin: Paris, France
- Genres: Electronic, rock, pop
- Years active: 2001–present
- Members: Laurent Bardainne; Nicolas Villebrun; Arnaud Roulin; Vincent Taeger
- Past members: Nicolas Ker (deceased)
- Website: Poni Hoax on Facebook

Poni Hoax are a French electronic music act.

== Biography ==
The four instrumentalists of Poni Hoax met at the Conservatoire National de Musique in Paris. After graduating, they formed Poni Hoax with Nicolas Ker whom they met in a local bar. Poni Hoax first drew attention in 2006 with its debut self-titled album, produced by Joakim on his label Tigersushi. The record surprised people with its electro-rock sound and quickly asserted fame for the band in France and abroad. The album included the singles "She's on the Radio" and "Budapest". "Budapest" ranked in the "Top 100" of Pitchfork in 2006, and became a smash hit in clubs all over Europe. Since then, the band has been remixed many times by DJ's worldwide. Poni Hoax have stated that the album was slightly rushed for vocals due to lack of experience. The album cover features a nude woman with an owl, which was censored for one iTunes release by darkening the original photograph. Despite the success of "Budapest", the album flopped on sales, producing little to support the band.

The band is heralded for its unique sound that comes from having two keyboardists, Arnaud Roulin and Laurent Bardainne, combined with a more traditional pop/rock rhythmic provided by Nicolas Villebrun on guitar, and Vincent Taeger on drums and percussion. Poni Hoax has listed The Doors and The Rolling Stones as the only influences the entire band enjoys listening to.

Poni Hoax released a more successful album in 2008: Images of Sigrid. Some compared the electro energy of Daft Punk, a few notes of Bowie, and Ian Curtis to the voice of Nicolas Ker (to whom he takes strong influence), plus a dash of David Byrne-esque funk in the instrumentation. "Faces in the Water," the 13-minute conclusion to the album, received mixed consumer reviews from places like iTunes and Amazon, some considering it boring and unnecessary, and some considering it a breath of fresh air. The slower and softer tunes evoke Nick Cave, and the album undergoes all the influences of the band. The album's concept revolves around Sigrid, a "presence" who is always in concerts and dance halls, and always in a good mood. The band has stated that they tried to maintain that light air while recording the second album. Also, they found the recording process went much smoother than on their first album because they had more experience.

The single "Antibodies" quickly became a radio hit and the controversial music video clip directed by Danakil received an award. It appeared in the video game Rock Band 3, attracting attention to the band from English-speaking audiences. From 2008 to 2010, the band played in major cities across the globe (New York, Montreal, London, Oslo, Moscow, Toronto), including a sold out concert in Paris and the opening for Franz Ferdinand in London.

The single "We Are the Bankers" was released in 2010 on Abracadabra Records. The band broke away from Tigersushi because they did not think it fit their "sound".

Years after the previous album came out, with Nicolas Ker joining a few side projects along the way, the band announced that a new album, A State of War, would come out in February 2013. They wanted it to have a false sense of happiness, with extremely dark lyrics and undertones. It was released on Pan European Recording instead of Abracadabra Records. In early 2013, the release date was pushed back to March to allow time for the final touches.

In late 2016, Poni Hoax announced that they would be releasing their fourth album, Tropical Suite, on 3 February 2017. They later released the first single from the album, "All the Girls".

Vocalist Nicolas Ker died on 17 May 2021, at the age of 50.

== Discography ==
=== Albums ===
- Poni Hoax (2006, Tigersushi)
- Images of Sigrid (2008, Tigersushi)
- A State of War (2013, Pan European)
- Tropical Suite (2017, Pan European)

=== Singles and EPs ===
- Budapest EP (2005, Tigersushi)
- She's on the Radio (2006, Tigersushi)
- Involutive Star EP (2007, Tigersushi)
- Antibodies (2007, Tigersushi)
- Hypercommunication (2008, Tigersushi)
- The Bird is on Fire (2008, Tigersushi)
- We Are the Bankers (2010, Abracadabra Records)
- Life in a New Motion (2012, Pan European)
- Down on Serpent Street (2013, Pan European)
- All the Girls (2016, Pan European)
- Everything Is Real (2016, Pan European)

=== Remixes ===
Year	Artist	Title
2008	Principles of Geometry	Prophet
