= DyE =

French musician

- Also known as: Juan de Guillebon
- Genres: Alternative rock, electronic, electropop, eclectic
- Years active: 2008–present
- Label: Tigersushi

Juan de Guillebon, better known by his stage name DyE, is a French musician. He is known for the music video of the single "Fantasy" from his first album Taki 183. This video became popular, attracting over 65 million views, 49 million of those within two years.

== Discography ==
=== Albums ===
- Taki 183 (2011)
- Cocktail Citron (2014)
- Inside Out (2018)
- MySpace (2024)

=== EPs ===
- Imperator (2009)
- Emo Machine (2017)
