= Odd Look =

2013 single by Kavinsky

- Digital EP cover. The EP includes the song itself along with five different remixes.

Single by Kavinsky featuring SebastiAn

from the album OutRun
- Released: 6 June 2013
- Recorded: 2012–2013
- Length: 4:12
- Label: Record Makers
- Songwriters: Vincent Belorgey; Sebastian Akchoté
- Producer: SebastiAn

Kavinsky singles chronology
"ProtoVision" (2013)	"Odd Look" (2013)	"Blizzard" (2013)

SebastiAn singles chronology
"Tetra" (2012)	"Odd Look" (2013)	"Thirst" (2019)

Music video
- "Odd Look" on YouTube

"Odd Look" is a song recorded by French electronic musician Kavinsky featuring fellow French disk jockey SebastiAn from his album OutRun (2013). The song was co-written by the two artists and produced by the latter. It was released as a single on 6 June 2013.

== Commercial performance ==
The single was a moderate hit in France, where it charted on the SNEP charts and reached a peak position of number 46.

== Music video ==
The music video for "Odd Look" premiered on 6 August 2013 on Kavinsky's Vevo account on YouTube.

== Usage in media ==
A snippet of the song was used in a 2012 French commercial for BMW i, which was shown in cinemas.

== Track listing ==
1. "Odd Look" (featuring The Weeknd) – 4:12
2. "Odd Look" (A-Trak Remix) – 4:21
3. "Odd Look" (Surkin Remix) – 4:02
4. "Odd Look" (Prince 85 Remix) – 5:17
5. "Odd Look" (Midnight Juggernauts Remix) – 5:08
6. "Odd Look" (featuring SebastiAn) (Album version) – 4:50

== Charts ==
Chart (2013)	Peak position
France (SNEP)	46

== The Weeknd remix ==
"Odd Look"

Single by Kavinsky featuring the Weeknd

from the album Odd Look EP and Kiss Land deluxe edition
- Released: 24 July 2013
- Recorded: 2012–2013
- Genre: Electro house; techno; PBR&B
- Length: 4:12
- Label: Record Makers; XO; Republic
- Songwriters: Abel Tesfaye; Vincent Belorgey; Ahmad Balshe; Sebastian Akchoté
- Producer: SebastiAn

The Weeknd singles chronology
"Belong to the World" (2013)	"Odd Look" (2013)	"Love in the Sky" (2013)

An official remix of the song featuring Canadian singer the Weeknd from the Kavinsky's Odd Look EP (2013) was released as a single on 24 July 2013. The Weeknd later included the remix on the deluxe edition of his debut studio album, Kiss Land (2013).

=== Commercial performance ===
The remixed single was a moderate hit in Belgium, where it charted on the Ultratop 50 Singles charts of both Flanders and Wallonia. Where it peaked at number 18 and 34 respectively. The song was also a minor success in the United States where it peaked at number 46 on the Billboard Dance/Electronic Songs chart.

=== Charts ===
Chart (2013)	Peak position
Belgium (Ultratop 50 Flanders)	18
Belgium (Ultratop 50 Wallonia)	34
US Hot Dance/Electronic Songs (Billboard)	46

=== Year-end charts ===
Chart (2013)	Position
Belgium (Ultratop 50 Flanders)	93
