= Teddy Boy (EP) =

EP by Kavinsky
- Released: January 16, 2006
- Genre: Electro house
- Length: 21:33
- Label: Record Makers
- Producer: Vincent Belorgey

Kavinsky chronology
Teddy Boy (2006)	1986 (2007)

Teddy Boy is an EP by French electro house artist Kavinsky released on January 16, 2006.

== Track listing ==
1. "Testarossa Autodrive" – 3:38
2. "Testarossa Autodrive" (Mr. Oizo Autodrive T42) – 3:21
3. "Transistor" – 1:23
4. "The Crash" – 1:48
5. "Testarossa Nightdrive" – 3:27
6. "Testarossa Autodrive" (Arpanet Nightdrive Rework) – 3:45
7. "Ghost Transistor" – 4:14

== Charts ==
Chart (2006)	Peak position
France (SNEP)	2
Belgium (Ultratop [Fl])	37
Belgium (Ultratop [Wa])	28
Switzerland (Hitparade)	38
