= Fuzati =

French rapper (born 1978)

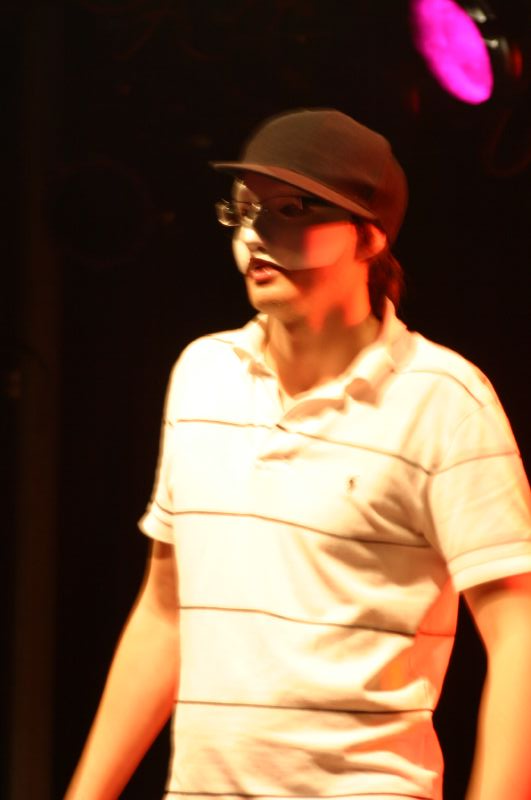
- Fuzati with the Klub des Loosers in Louvain in 2007

Background information
- Born: 1978; Versailles, France
- Genre: Hip hop
- Occupations: Rapper; singer; songwriter; DJ; record producer
- Years active: 1999–present

Fuzati (French pronunciation: [fudzati]; born in 1978 in Versailles) is a French rapper, singer, DJ and record producer. A secretive artist who performs wearing his signature white mask, and is noted for his wordplay, misanthropic and morbid lyrics, he is mostly known as the co-founder and frontman of the hip hop project Klub des Loosers. He was also the founder of rap collective Klub des 7 in the 2000s.

== Career ==
Fuzati studied communications law and worked as a journalist in Clark magazine before engaging in musical career as an MC and co-founder. His stage name is derived from Italian novelist and journalist Dino Buzzati.

=== Klub des Loosers ===
Klub des Loosers
- Genres: Rap, Hip hop
- Years active: 2000 – present
- Members: Fuzati (2000–present)
- Past members: Orgasmic (2000–2003); DJ Detect (2003–2013)

Fuzati was co-founder in 2000 of the musical project Klub des Loosers, with producer Orgasmic (as DJ Orgasmic le Toxicologue).

When Orgasmic left Klub des Loosers to join TTC, DJ Detect joined as long-time partner of the duo Klub des Loosers.

=== Le Klub des 7 ===
Le Klub des 7
- Genres: Rap, Hip hop
- Years active: 2006–2010
- Labels: Vicious Circle Records, Encore Records
- Members: Fuzati; DJ Detect; Gérard Baste; James Delleck; Le Jouage; Cyanure
- Past members: Fredy K (died in 2007)

Fuzati continued with releasing Klub des Loosers materials and organized formation of a rap collective under the emblem Le Klub de 7 with invitation to known rappers and hip hop artists from various groups. The "seven" were: James Delleck and Le Jouage (from Gravité Zéro project), Gérard Baste (of Svinkels), Cyanure and Fredy K (of the collective ATK) and Detect (his partner in Klub des Loosers).

Many had already participated in a successful joint release in 2003 titled Baise Les Gens that had been credited to Fuzati, Teki Latex, James Delleck, Cyanure, Tacteel and Para One on cover. In 2007, as the collective formalized as Le Klub des 7, they released the albums Le Klub des 7 as a self-titled album soon after which, Fredy K (part of the "seven") died in a motorcycle accident on 7 November 2007. The collective had one follow-up album La Classe de Musique in 2009 before parting ways.

=== Other collaborations ===
Fuzati collaborated with Teki Latex, a member of TTC in the program Grek'frites on Canalweb between 1999 and 2001.

In the early 2000s, Fuzati collaborated with rap collective L'Atelier with the likes of Teki Latex, Cyanure (of ATK), James Delleck and Tacteel (who were working as a DJ duo as FuckALoop) and Para One (DJ in the formation TTC). L'Atelier released the albums Buffet des anciens élèves and Thé dansant des anciens élèves both in 2003.

In a separate link, Fuzati also collaborated with Jean-Benoît Dunckel (from electronic music duo Air) in 2004.

In 2014, Fuzati and Orgasmic, former collaborators within Klub des Loosers, released the collective album Grand Siècle and a single Planetarium.

== Personal life and public image ==
Fuzati is secretive about his personal life, not publicly disclosing personal details such as his birth name, he stated he grew up in Versailles in a middle-class family. In interviews and in his songs, he has expressed arguments against having children. He is known for his signature white mask which covers the upper half of his face in his public appearances; he wears the mask on stage, in video clips and during interviews. He has stated that as an artist, wearing a mask allowed him to distance himself from his stage persona. He described the stage persona as a "character" based on his teenage self, deliberately made more upper-class than he is himself, to play on stereotypes on his native city of Versailles and to stand out in the French rap scene, he stated.

== Discography ==
in L'Atelier

- 2003: Buffet des anciens élèves

as Klub des Loosers

Year	Album	Peak positions
Year	Album	FR
2004	Vive la vie	178
2012	La fin de l'espèce [Format: CD / LP, Les Disques du Manoir]	70
2017	Le chat et autres histoires	111

Others

- 2003: La femme de fer [two releases, CD and 12" vinyl]
- 2004: Sous le signe du V [Vinyl 12"]
- 2005: AM704 [7" vinyl]
- 2005: Radio Show Vol. 1 [CD]
- 2008–2012: Broadcast Sessions [CD]
  - 2008: Vol. 1
  - 2008: Vol. 1
  - 2010: Vol. 3
  - 2012: Vol. 4
- 2010: Spring Tales [CD] (Klub Records)
- 2012: Spring Tales (release) [CD / LP] (Corso Fleuri editions)
- 2013: Last Days [CD / LP]

in Le Klub de 7

- 2003: Baise Les Gens [credited to Fuzati, Teki Latex, James Delleck, Cyanure, Tacteel, Para One – CD and 12" vinyl)
- 2006: Le Klub des 7 (credited to Le Klub de 7, Vicious Circle Records)
- 2009: La Classe de Musique – (Le Klub de 7, two releases – as EP and as an album) (Encore Records)

as Orgasmic and Fuzati

Year	Album	Peak positions	
Year	Album	FR	BEL (Wa)
2014	Grand siècle	69	83
