= Gerald Donald =

American techno producer and artist

Gerald Donald is a Detroit techno producer and artist. With James Stinson he formed the afrofuturist techno duo Drexciya, and he is the main member of Dopplereffekt.

== Biography ==
Donald is notoriously silent on himself and even his involvement with various musical projects. In a 2013 interview, when asked about his anonymity and his work with James Stinson and Drexciya, he said, "I will not directly indicate my involvement in any project. I will leave this question open to observer interpretation. The most important thing has always been the music and concept itself. I adhere to this philosophy. People spend way too much time engaging personalities rather than the music that’s accompanying that personality." Frequently referred to as an afrofuturist, he said he "do[es] not wish to specify any particular ethnicity."

With Drexciya, he made techno music on which an afrofuturist mythology was built, involving the Drexciyans, an underwater race, "the descendants of the African women thrown overboard in the transatlantic slave trade." Their songs had marine and maritime themes and titles; live, they appeared only masked.

Another musical project of his is Dopplereffekt, with To Nhan Le Thi, to whom he is married. He is also in electro group Der Zyklus (German lit. "The Cycle").

Arpanet is a pseudonym of Dopplereffekt's Gerald Donald. It was named after ARPANET, one of the precursors to the internet. Initially a suspected duo between Stinson and Donald, since Stinson's death in 2002, Arpanet is established as Donald alone.

== Discography ==
=== As Arpanet ===
- Wireless Internet (2002), Record Makers
- Quantum Transposition (2005), Rephlex
- Reference Frame (2006), Record Makers
- Inertial Frame (2006), Record Makers
