= Sébastien Tellier =

French singer and musician (born 1975)

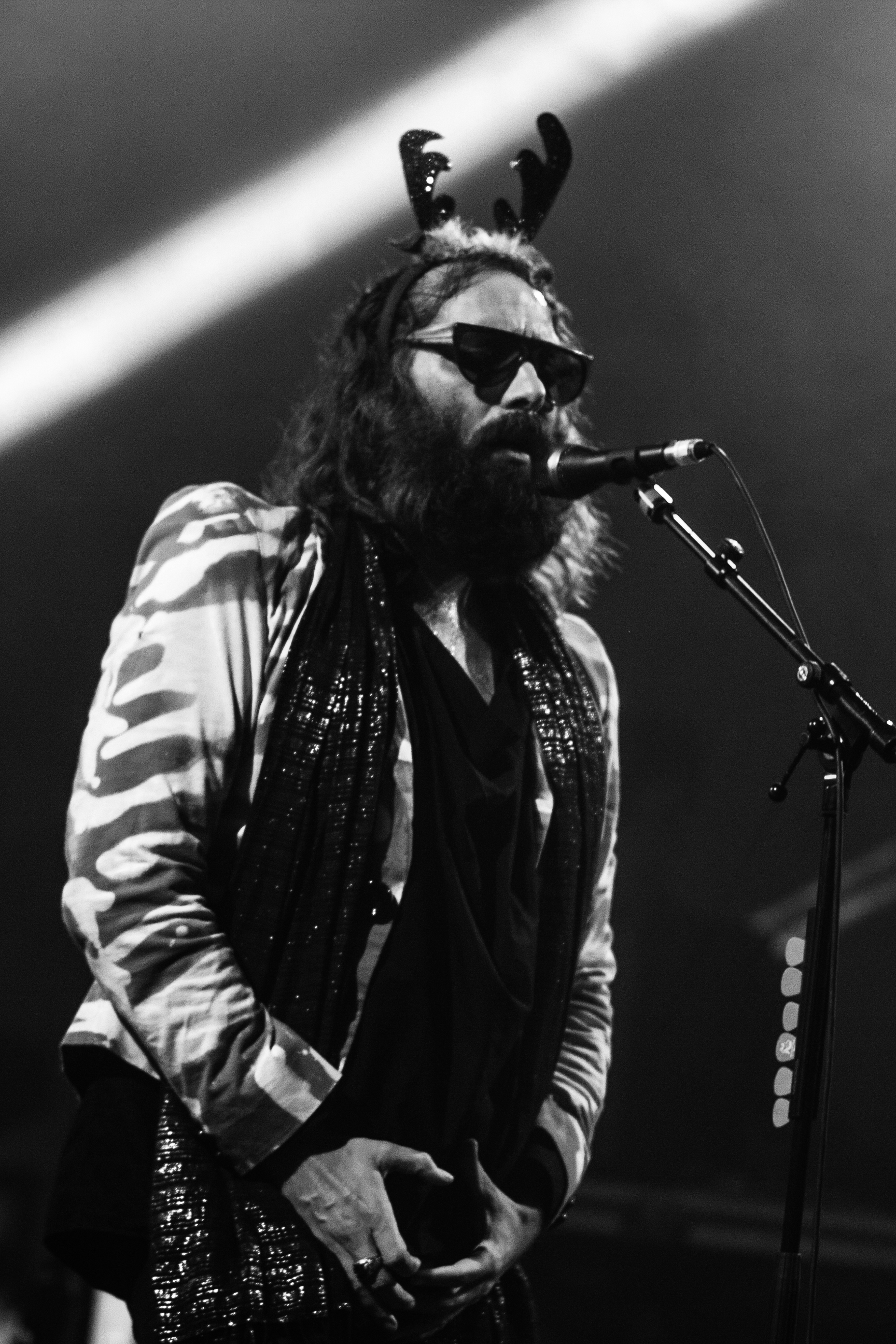
- Tellier at the 2012 Dour Festival

Background information
- Born: 22 February 1975 (age 51); Le Plessis-Bouchard, France
- Genres: French pop; new wave; synthpop; electronica
- Occupation: Musician
- Instruments: Vocals; guitar; piano; bass guitar; synthesizer; keyboards; percussion
- Years active: 2001–present
- Label: Record Makers
- Website: sebastientellier.com

Sébastien Tellier (French: [sebastjɛ̃ tɛlje]; born 22 February 1975) is a French singer, songwriter and multi-instrumentalist. He represented France in the Eurovision Song Contest 2008 with his song "Divine". He has also produced songs for Dita Von Teese and composed music for the French films Narco and Steak, among others. Tellier is currently signed to Record Makers, a French independent record label. He sings in English, Spanish, French, German and Italian.

== Biography ==
Tellier is the son of rhythm guitarist Alain Tellier, who is known to have played with the band Magma. Tellier attended the École Saint-Martin-de-France in Pontoise, Val-d'Oise.

Tellier's first album, L'incroyable Vérité (English: The Incredible Truth), was released in 2001. Tellier went on tour with Air in support of the album and was joined on stage by theremin player Pamelia Kurstin. L'incroyable Vérité is a pop album featuring styles from lo-fi electronica to bizarre cabaret tunes.

The same year, he appears, alongside Vincent Belorgey, also known as Kavinsky, in Nonfilm, directed by Quentin Dupieux.

His second studio album, Politics, released on 31 January 2004. Politics included the popular song "La Ritournelle", a string-led tune with Nigerian drummer Tony Allen.

The same year, he composed the soundtrack for the film Narco, directed by Tristan Aurouet and Gilles Lellouche. The soundtrack released two years later, on 9 November 2007.

Since the release of Politics, Tellier has also recorded an acoustic album of his more popular songs, Sessions (2006). The album was repackaged for the British market as Universe (2006), to include both highlights from the French CD, as well as compositions from Tellier's score for the film Narco. This compilation included a cover of "La Dolce Vita", a song originally by French singer Christophe.

In 2007, he composed a few songs with Quentin Dupieux, also known as Mr. Oizo, for the soundtrack of the film Steak, directed by Mr. Oizo himself. Also co-composed by Sebastian, the soundtrack was released by Ed Banger and Because Music the same year. Tellier also appears in the film as Prisme, the man with the electric wheelchair.

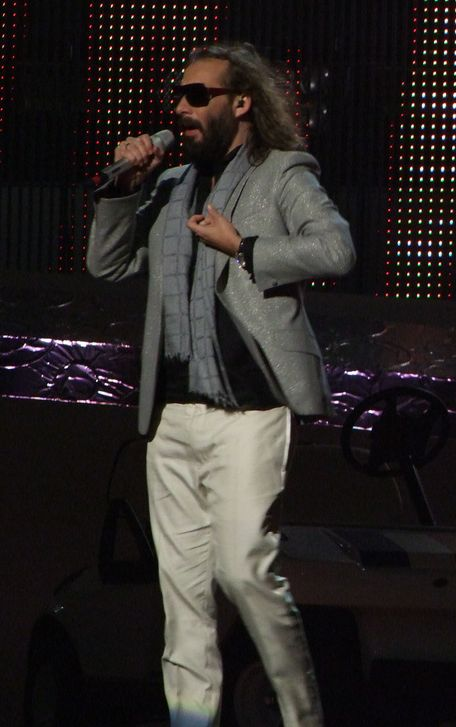
Sébastien Tellier performing "Divine" at the final of the Eurovision Song Contest 2008 in Belgrade, Serbia, 24 May 2008

His third studio album Sexuality was produced by Guy-Manuel de Homem-Christo of Daft Punk. Like his previous album Politics, Tellier used a single term as title and theme of the album. Tellier's label Record Makers collaborated with retailer American Apparel for an exclusive three-month pre-release of the album, whilst American Apparel sold limited edition versions of the Sexuality CD, LP and "Divine" 7" and 12" single through their North American stores and website.

On 7 March 2008, it was announced by Bruno Berberes, head of EBU delegation in France, that Tellier would represent France in the Eurovision Song Contest 2008. It was held in Belgrade on 24 May 2008. Tellier sang "Divine". This was the first time in the history of the contest that the nominated French entry was to be performed largely in English, which caused controversy, leading to Tellier pledging to increase the amount of French in the song prior to the competition itself. In total, the entry received 47 points.

His fourth album My God Is Blue was released on 23 April 2012. As the name suggests, the concept of this album is religion. Tellier is presented in this album as a guru, founder of a fictional sect called "Alliance Bleue". The album is entirely produced by Mr. Flash and Pavle Kovacevic.

His fifth album Confection was released in October 2013. This was partially inspired by the death of Tellier's grandmother. Some of the music on the album was intended to appear on a film soundtrack, but ended up not being used. In an interview with artistxite, Tellier noted: "You can say my grandmother's death as well as this nonexisting soundtrack had an impact on “Confection“. To me this has been a super strange situation. I was full of love for my grandmother and full of dedication to this soundtrack; Confection is the result of both of these emotional conditions." In Spring 2014, Tellier performed a medley of tracks from Confection at the Chanel Haute Couture show at the Grand Palais. Tellier recounts that Karl Lagerfeld invited him to perform, having listened to the album himself.

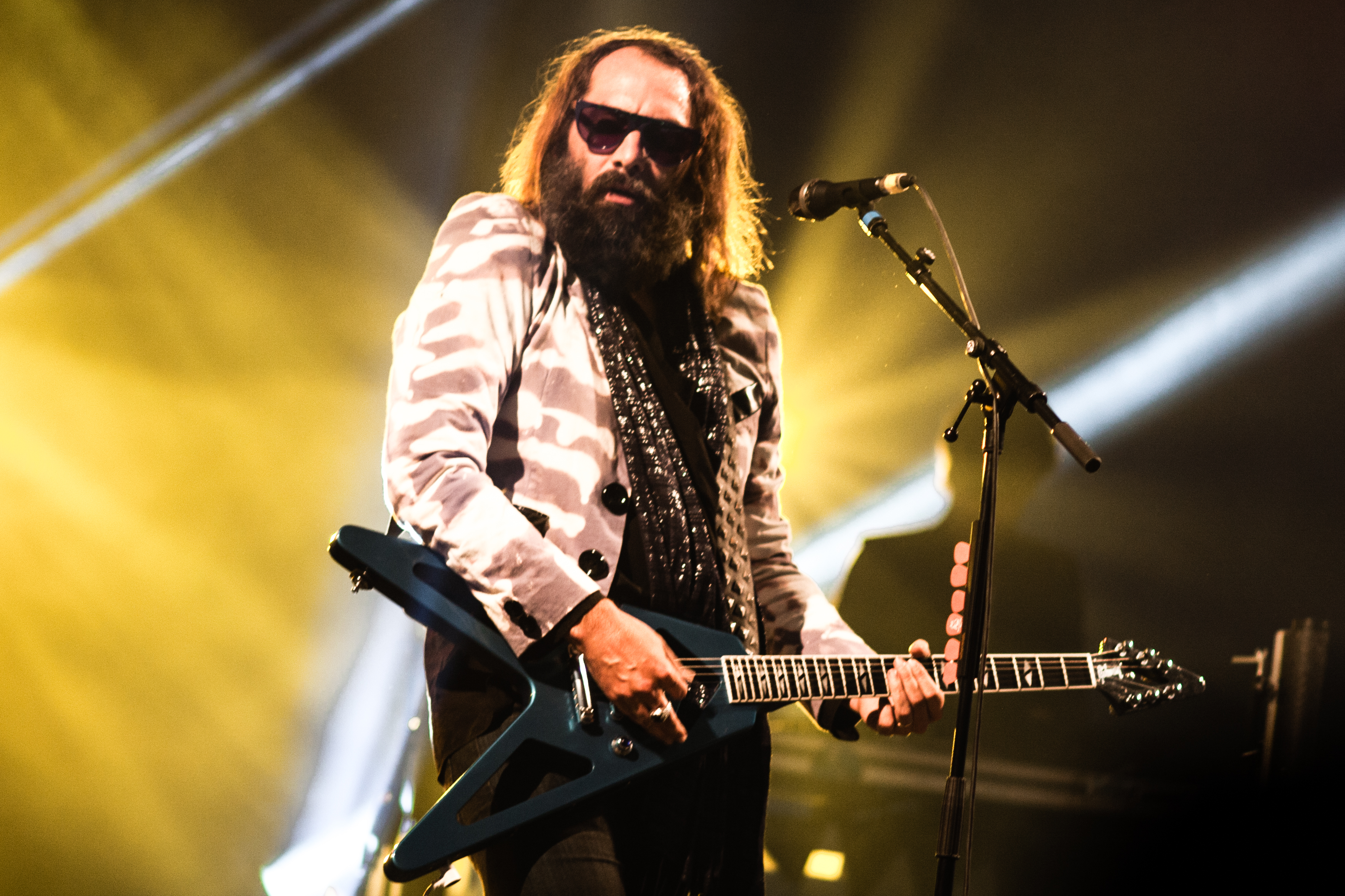
Tellier performing at the 2012 Dour Festival

His sixth album L'Aventura (English: The Adventure) was released on 14 July 2014. The album was inspired by Tellier's childhood and Brazil, where the video to one of its songs, "L'adulte", is set. This album, consisting of 10 tracks, is sung entirely in French.

In 2016, Tellier composed soundtracks for the two French films Saint-Amour, directed by Benoît Delépine and Gustave Kervern, and Marie et les naufragés, directed by Sébastien Betbeder. The same year, he composed the music for the credits of the comedy show broadcast on Canal+, Groland Le Zapoï. The next year, he composed the soundtrack for the series A Girl Is a Gun.

In 2018, Tellier composed all the songs from the eponymous album by Dita Von Teese.

In 2020, Tellier returned with a new single "A Ballet", released on 29 January, to promote his seventh album Domesticated, consisting of 8 tracks, which released on 29 May 2020. On 8 April, "Domestic Tasks", the second single released and "Stuck in a Summer Love" the third single on 19 May. The concept on this album is domestic life and this concept was born following his marriage and the birth of his two children. The album is produced by Corentin "nit" Kerdraon, Mind Gamers (John Carroll Kirby and Daniel Stricker), Jam City, Varnish La Piscine and Philippe Zdar (who died in 2019). Apart from this album, on 14 February 2020, he appeared as a featured artist on "Boycycle" by Salvatore Ganacci.

The same year, Tellier released an album titled Simple Mind, in which he covered several tracks from his previous albums, Sexuality, My God Is Blue, L'Aventura and Domesticated.

In 2024, Tellier performed La Ritournelle with Ensemble Matheus at the Paralympic Games opening ceremony in Paris.

In April 2025, Tellier was appointed as an Chevalier of the Ordre des Arts et des Lettres.

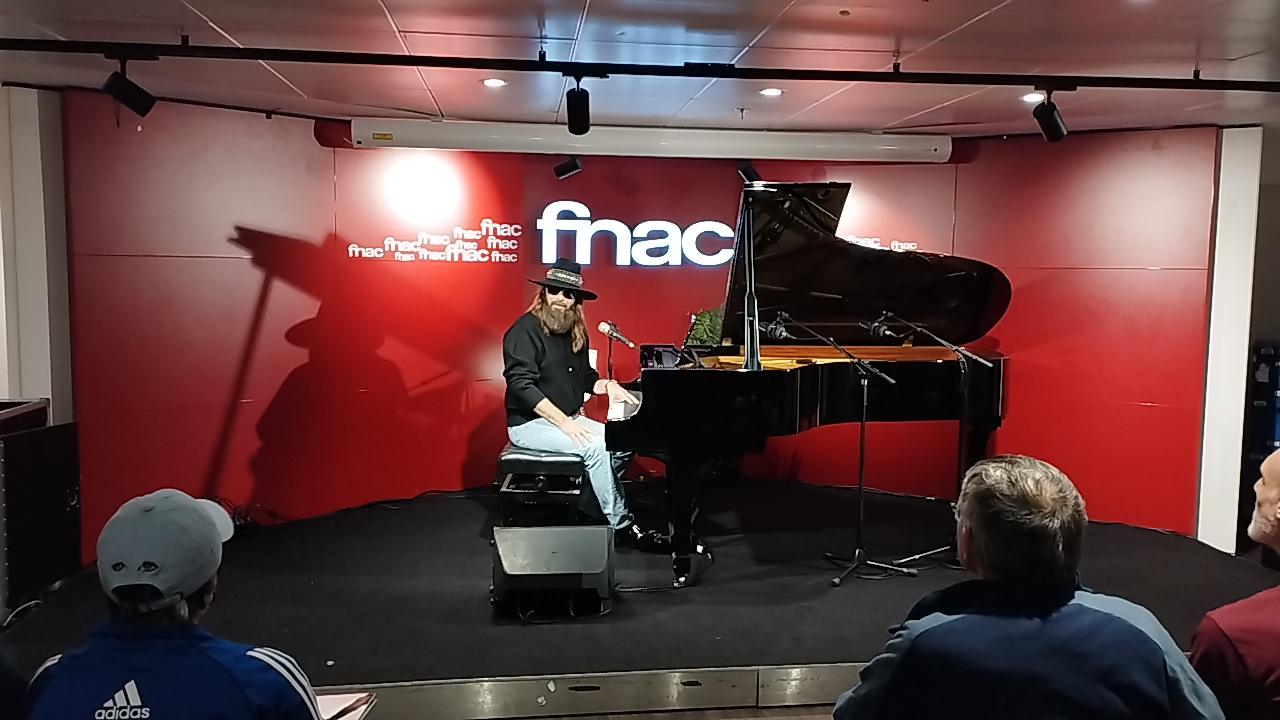
Tellier performing for Fnac in 2026

In September 2025, Tellier returned with a new single, "Refresh", which marked his first single in five years after the release of Domesticated, and would later be revealed as the lead single to his next album. A month later, in October, he officially announced his eighth album, titled Kiss the Beast, along with the release of the album's second single, "Naïf de Coeur". The third single, "Thrill of the Night", was released the next month, in November, and features Chic guitarist Nile Rodgers and singer-songwriter Slayyyter. In January 2026, Tellier performed the song "Parfum Diamant" on the Colors YouTube channel, which would then become the fourth single from the album, released days later. The fifth and final single, "Amnesia", which features rapper and singer Kid Cudi, was released two days before the album's release. The album was officially released on 30 January 2026.

== Influences ==
Tellier's musical artistry is inspired by Serge Gainsbourg, François de Roubaix, Antonin Artaud, Salvador Dalí, Lucio Battisti, and Stevie Wonder.

== Personal life ==
Tellier is married to Amandine de la Richardière with whom he has two children.

== Discography ==
=== Studio albums ===
Title	Details	Chart positions			Certifications
Title	Details	FRA	BEL	SWE	Certifications
L'incroyable Vérité	Released: 12 June 2001; Label: Record Makers; Formats: CD, LP, digital download	—	—	—	
Politics	Released: 31 January 2004; Label: Record Makers; Formats: CD, LP, digital download	123	—	—	
Sexuality	Released: 25 February 2008; Label: Record Makers; Formats: CD, LP, digital download	33	68	43	
My God Is Blue	Released: 23 April 2012; Label: Record Makers; Formats: CD, LP, digital download	17	31	—	
Confection	Released: 14 October 2013; Label: Record Makers; Formats: CD, LP, digital download	52	69	—	
L'Aventura	Released: 17 July 2014; Label: Record Makers; Formats: CD, LP, digital download	53	54	—	
Domesticated	Released: 29 May 2020; Label: Record Makers; Formats: CD, LP, digital download	117	93	85	
Kiss the Beast	Released: 30 January 2026; Label: Because Music; Formats: CD, LP, digital download	42	81	—	
"—" denotes releases that did not chart or were not released in that territory.

=== Soundtracks ===
Title	Details
Steak (Music from the Motion Picture) (with Mr. Oizo and SebastiAn)	Released: 18 June 2007; Label: Ed Banger Records, Because Music; Formats: CD, digital download
Narco (Original Motion Picture Score)	Released: 9 November 2007; Label: Record Makers; Formats: CD, LP, digital download
Marie et les naufragés (Original Motion Picture Score)	Released: 8 April 2016; Label: Record Makers; Formats: CD, LP, digital download
A Girl Is a Gun (Music from the Original Series)	Released: 13 October 2017; Label: Record Makers; Formats: Digital download

=== Compilations ===
Title	Details
Sessions	Released: 20 January 2006; Label: Record Makers; Peaked in FRANCE: #192
Universe	Released: 2006; Label: Record Makers
Sexuality Remix	Released: 9 April 2010; Label: Record Makers
Love Songs	Released: 29 April 2011; Label: Record Makers
Simple Mind	Released: 13 November 2020; Label: Record Makers

=== Other contributions ===
Title	Details	Notes
Dita Von Teese (by Dita Von Teese)	Released: 16 February 2018; Label: Record Makers; Formats: CD, LP, digital download	Written and composed by Sébastien Tellier

=== Singles ===
Title	Year	Peak chart positions						Album
Title	Year	FRA	BEL	DEN	GER	SWE	UK	Album
"La Ritournelle"	2005	167	—	—	—	—	66	Politics
"Broadway"	2006	—	—	—	—	—	—	Politics
"Divine"	2008	—	15	39	—	4	106	Sexuality
"Roche"	2009	—	—	—	—	—	—	Sexuality
"Kilometer"	2009	—	64	—	—	—	—	Sexuality
"Fingers of Steel"	2009	89	—	—	—	—	—	Sexuality
"L'amour et la violence"	2009	—	—	—	97	—	—	Sexuality
"Cochon ville"	2012	69	78	—	—	—	—	My God Is Blue
"In The Crew of Tea Time" (with Caroline Polachek)	2013	—	—	—	—	—	—	Non-album single
"L'amour naissant"	2013	154	—	—	—	—	—	Confection
"Aller vers le soleil"	2014	—	—	—	—	—	—	L'Aventura
"Ricky l'adolescent"	2014	—	—	—	—	—	—	L'Aventura
"A Ballet"	2020	—	—	—	—	—	—	Domesticated
"Domestic Tasks"	2020	—	—	—	—	—	—	Domesticated
"Stuck in a Summer Love"	2020	—	—	—	—	—	—	Domesticated
"Refresh"	2025	—	—	—	—	—	—	Kiss the Beast
"Naïf de Coeur"	2025	—	—	—	—	—	—	Kiss the Beast
"Thrill of the Night"	2025	—	—	—	—	—	—	Kiss the Beast
"Parfum Diamant"	2026	—	—	—	—	—	—	Kiss the Beast
"Amnesia"	2026	—	—	—	—	—	—	Kiss the Beast
"—" denotes releases that did not chart or were not released in that territory.

=== Other appearances ===
Title	Year	Other Artist(s)	Album
"A Mountain for President" (featuring Sébastien Tellier)	2007	Principles of Geometry	Lazare
"Gisele"	2016	Jean-Michel Jarre	Electronica 2: The Heart of Noise
"When You Die"	2018	MGMT	Little Dark Age
"Señorita"	2019	Christophe	Christophe Etc.
"Boycycle" (featuring Sébastien Tellier)	2020	Salvatore Ganacci	Boycycle EP
"Feels Like Summer – Souvenirs d'été" (Deezer Original)	2020	None	Non-album single
"Goodbye" (featuring Sébastien Tellier)	2022	Kavinsky	Reborn

Preceded by Les Fatals Picards with L'amour à la française	France in the Eurovision Song Contest; 2008	Succeeded by Patricia Kaas with Et s'il fallait le faire
