= Politics (Sébastien Tellier album) =

Studio album by Sébastien Tellier
- Released: 31 January 2004
- Genre: Lounge; orchestral pop; psychedelic pop
- Length: 40:05
- Label: Record Makers; Astralwerks
- Producer: Sébastien Tellier

Sébastien Tellier chronology
L'incroyable Vérité (2001)	Politics (2004)	Sexuality (2008)

Professional ratings
Review scores
Source	Rating
AllMusic	3/5 stars
Der Spiegel	6/10
Ondarock	6.5/10
Tiny Mix Tapes	3/5 stars

Politics is the second studio album by French singer Sébastien Tellier, released on 31 January 2004 by Record Makers and Astralwerks. The album features drumming provided by Tony Allen. The songs are sung in English, German and Spanish.

== Reception ==
Amneziak of Tiny Mix Tapes rated the album 3 out of 5 stars, saying "regardless of what has been said here, Sebastien Tellier's talents haven's been dismissed. I find myself truly loving a small handful of these songs".

== Track listing ==
No.	Title	Length
1.	"Bye-Bye"	2:19
2.	"League Chicanos"	3:12
3.	"Wonderafrica"	5:08
4.	"Broadway"	4:03
5.	"La Ritournelle"	7:34
6.	"Benny"	3:10
7.	"Slow Lynch"	1:20
8.	"Mauer"	3:19
9.	"La tuerie"	2:58
10.	"Ketchup vs. Genocide"	3:46
11.	"Zombi"	3:22
Total length:		40:05

== Personnel ==
- Sébastien Tellier – producer
- Mathieu Tonetti – producer
- Frederick N'Landu – mixing
- Philippe Zdar – mixing
- Noel Summerville – mastering
- Hélène Grand – photography
- Manu Cossu – artwork
- Alexandre Courtès – artwork

== Charts ==
Chart performance for Politics
Chart (2004)	Peak position
French Albums (SNEP)	123

Chart (2005)	Peak position
UK Dance Albums (OCC)	26
UK Independent Albums (OCC)	50
