= Kavinsky =

French DJ and record producer (1975–2026)

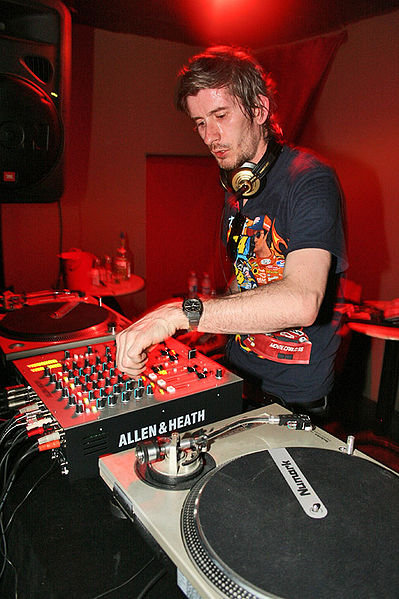
- Kavinsky in 2007

Background information
- Born: Vincent Pierre Claude Belorgey; 31 July 1975; Barbès, Paris, France
- Died: 28 July 2026 (aged 50) Paris, France
- Genres: French house; synthwave
- Years active: 2005–2026
- Labels: Record Makers; Vertigo; Universal Music France; Casablanca/Republic
- Website: kavinsky.com

Vincent Pierre Claude Belorgey (31 July 1975 – 28 July 2026), known professionally as Kavinsky, was a French DJ, record producer and actor. His production style is reminiscent of the electropop film soundtracks of the 1980s. Kavinsky said that his music was inspired by thousands of films he watched as a young boy and he grabbed the best parts from them, consolidating them into one concept.

Kavinsky has been compared to French house artists including Danger and Daft Punk. He achieved greater recognition after his song "Nightcall" was featured in the 2011 film Drive. His debut studio album, OutRun, was released in 2013, followed by Reborn in 2022.

== Career ==
Belorgey was born in the Parisian neighborhood of Barbès on 31 July 1975. After years as an actor, Kavinsky's musical career started in 2005 after he was inspired by his close friends Jackson Fourgeaud and Quentin Dupieux. He acted in Dupieux's 2007 film Steak; the film also included Kavinsky's music. During this period, Kavinsky produced his first single, "Testarossa Autodrive", inspired by the Ferrari Testarossa (one of which Belorgey drove in real life). Kavinsky presented the single to Dupieux, who in turn presented it to a record label he had access to because of his filming career, and Kavinsky signed with Record Makers.

Kavinsky went on to release three EPs on the Record Makers label: Teddy Boy in 2006, 1986 a year later, and Nightcall with Lovefoxxx of CSS in 2010. Kavinsky toured alongside Daft Punk, The Rapture, Justice, and SebastiAn in 2007.

The SebastiAn remix of "Testarossa Autodrive" off the 1986 EP is featured in the video games Grand Theft Auto IV and Gran Turismo 5 Prologue. Kavinsky's single "Nightcall" was featured in the opening credits of the film Drive, and became a major hit soon after. In December 2012, he released "ProtoVision". On 25 February 2013, he released his debut studio album, OutRun.

In November 2021, he returned from a seven year hiatus with the lead single "Renegade" from his second studio album Reborn. The song is produced by Gaspard Augé and Victor Le Masne. In March 2022, he released "Zenith", another single from Reborn which features vocals from Prudence and Morgan Phalen.

At the 2024 Summer Olympics closing ceremony in Paris, Kavinsky performed Nightcall alongside Phoenix and Angèle. The performance triggered a significant global resurgence for "Nightcall", leading to a new official studio version featuring Angèle and Phoenix released in September 2024. This version achieved a diamond certification from SNEP and reached number 3 on the French singles chart. The track's enduring status in popular culture was further solidified in 2025 when the Irish rock band Inhaler released a guitar-driven cover of the song for Triple J's Like A Version, which was subsequently released as a physical seven-inch single.

== Persona ==
Kavinsky was a stage persona used by Belorgey. The character had red eyes and blue skin. The fictional backstory is that Kavinsky crashed his Testarossa in 1986, then reappeared in 2006 as a zombie that makes electronic music. Kavinsky's songs are intended to tell the character's story. Belorgey explained, "'Night Call' is just about the zombie guy [who] goes to his girlfriend's house and says okay I'm not the same, we need to talk", referring to the resurrected Kavinsky going to find his former girlfriend, who has already moved on with her life. "Kavinsky is a character I created because just putting my face on a record sleeve isn't something that suits me. [...] Showing my own face holds absolutely no interest for me. I'd much rather make music and tell a story, because for me music is linked to images. When I'm making music, I have images in my head of films and television shows I liked when I was little. So I created this story that mixes all those memories together."

== Equipment ==
Kavinsky started making music on an old Apple computer given to him by his friend and fellow musician Quentin Dupieux. He stated in an interview that the entirety of Teddy Boy was written and recorded on a Yamaha DX7, which is associated with the synth-pop sound of the 1980s.

== Death ==
Belorgey was found dead at his home in Paris on 28 July 2026, three days before his 51st birthday. French president Emmanuel Macron posted a tribute on social media, saying he was "a source of French pride forever". French Culture Minister Catherine Pégard said, "Both danceable and nostalgic, his music will continue to resonate across generations and borders". Others such as the Weeknd, and the mayor of Paris, Emmanuel Grégoire, also wrote tributes to him after his death. The cause of Belorgey's death is not known, and there is a pending investigation, but a police source said that a stroke is suspected. He had reportedly been complaining of headaches in the preceding days. He was interred at Saint-Vincent Cemetery.

== Discography ==
=== Studio albums ===
List of studio albums, with selected chart positions
Title	Album details	Peak chart positions									
Title	Album details	FRA	BEL (FL)	BEL (WA)	GER	SCO	SWI	UK	UK Dance	US	US Dance
OutRun	Released: 22 February 2013; Label: Record Makers; Formats: CD, digital download, vinyl	2	37	28	—	—	38	159	8	156	5
Reborn	Released: 25 March 2022; Label: Record Makers; Formats: CD, digital download, vinyl	13	172	20	56	64	32	— (Note: Reborn did not enter the UK Albums Chart, but peaked at number 45 on the UK Album Sales Chart.)	3	—	—
"—" denotes a recording that did not chart or was not released in that territory.

=== Extended plays ===
Year	Title	Release date	Label
2005	Teddy Boy	10 December 2005	Record Makers
2007	1986	3 March 2007	Record Makers
2008	Blazer	1 July 2008	Fool's Gold Records
2010	Nightcall	27 March 2010	Record Makers
2011	Nightcall (Anniversary Edition)	11 November 2011	Record Makers
2013	ProtoVision	26 January 2013	Record Makers
2013	Odd Look	6 April 2013	Record Makers

=== Singles ===
Title	Year	Peak chart positions										Certifications	Album
Title	Year	FRA	BEL (FL)	BEL (WA)	SCO	SWI	UK	UK Dance	UK Indie	US Sales	US Dance	Certifications	Album
"Nightcall" (featuring Lovefoxxx)	2010	10	28	16	72	37	60	37	29	11	— (Note: "Nightcall" did not enter the Hot Dance/Electronic Songs chart, but peaked at number 5 on the Dance Single Sales chart.)	SNEP: Diamond; BPI: Gold	OutRun
"Roadgame"	2012	12	—	— (Note: "Roadgame" did not enter the Wallonie Ultratop 50, but peaked at number 32 on the Ultratip chart.)	—	74	—	—	—	—	—		OutRun
"ProtoVision"	2012	52	—	—	—	—	—	—	—	—	—		OutRun
"Odd Look" (featuring SebastiAn)	2013	46	—	—	—	—	— (Note: "Odd Look" did not enter the UK Single Sales Chart, but peaked at number 84 on the UK Physical Singles Chart.)	—	—	—	—		OutRun
"Blizzard"	2013	167	—	—	—	—	—	—	—	—	—		OutRun
"Odd Look" (featuring The Weeknd)	2013	—	18	10	—	—	—	—	—	—	46		Odd Look and Kiss Land
"Renegade" (featuring Cautious Clay)	2021	—	—	—	—	—	—	—	—	—	—		Reborn
"Zenith"	2022	—	—	—	—	—	—	—	—	—	—		Reborn
"Nightcall" (with Angèle and Phoenix)	2024	3	18	4	—	—	—	—	—	—	—	SNEP: Diamond	Non-album single
"—" denotes a recording that did not chart or was not released.

=== Remixes ===
Year	Artist	Title
2007	Klaxons	"Gravity's Rainbow"
2007	M.I.A.	"Roder" (A-Trak Re-work)
2008	Sébastien Tellier	"Roche"
2011	SebastiAn	"Embody"

=== Music videos ===
Year	Title	Director	Release date	Label
2006	"Testarossa Autodrive"	Jonas & François	23 June 2006	Record Makers
2009	"Dead Cruiser"	—	February 2009	Record Makers
2012	"ProtoVision"	Marcus Herring	12 December 2012	Record Makers
2013	"Odd Look"	Marcus Herring	6 August 2013	Record Makers
2021	"Renegade"	Alexandre Courtès	19 November 2021	Record Makers
2022	"Cameo"	Filip Nilsson	25 March 2022	Record Makers

== Filmography ==
Year	Title	Director	Role
2001	Nonfilm	Quentin Dupieux	Pattt
2003	Aaltra	Gustave Kervern and Benoît Delépine	Agent SNCF
2004	Atomik Circus, le retour de James Bataille	Didier Poiraud and Thierry Poiraud	Boon / Ricardo Bello-Radio Skotlett
2005	Ultranova	Bouli Lanners	Verbrugghe
2007	Steak	Quentin Dupieux	Dan
