= Tigersushi Records =

French record label

Tigersushi Records is an independent record label based in Paris, France. They have released music by MU, Ivan Smagghe, Poni Hoax, Pierre Bastien, DyE, The Faulty Shotgun, John Tejada, among others.

== See also ==
- List of record labels
