= La Ritournelle =

2005 single by Sébastien Tellier

Single by Sébastien Tellier

from the album Politics
- Released: 26 September 2004
- Recorded: 2003
- Genre: Baroque pop; downtempo
- Length: 7:36
- Label: Record Makers; Astralwerks
- Songwriter: Sébastien Tellier

Sébastien Tellier singles chronology
"La Ritournelle" (2004)	"Broadway" (2004)

"La Ritournelle" is a song by Sébastien Tellier from his 2004 album Politics. It was released as a single on 26 September 2004; along with the original, this included remixes by Mr. Dan, Jim Noir and Jake Bullit.

The track received much critical acclaim. On www.thebeatsurrender.co.uk, Kev writes: "Tellier has created one of the most beautiful, symphonic dance tracks you’ll ever hear in your lives". The song features drumming by Tony Allen. In October 2011, NME placed "La Ritournelle" at number 110 on its list "150 Best Tracks of the Past 15 Years".

== Promotional uses ==
In 2009, the track was used in Five US's 'scroller' ident, which features bird's eye views of New York at night. The song was also used in the eleventh episode of the third season of ABCs hit show Ugly Betty, in advertisements for Australian sports channel One HD, and in a European L'Oreal commercial starring Patrick Dempsey. Sky Sports Cricket used the track during live coverage to promote upcoming games. It was also featured in The CW's Gossip Girl and appears on the show's soundtrack. It was also used as a backing track for the credits in a Come Dine with Me episode and features on the soundtrack of award-winning film Oslo, August 31st by Joachim Trier. In 2024, Tellier performed "La Ritournelle" with Ensemble Matheus at the Paralympic Games opening ceremony in Paris.

== See also ==
- Late Night Tales: The Cinematic Orchestra
