= Gesaffelstein discography =

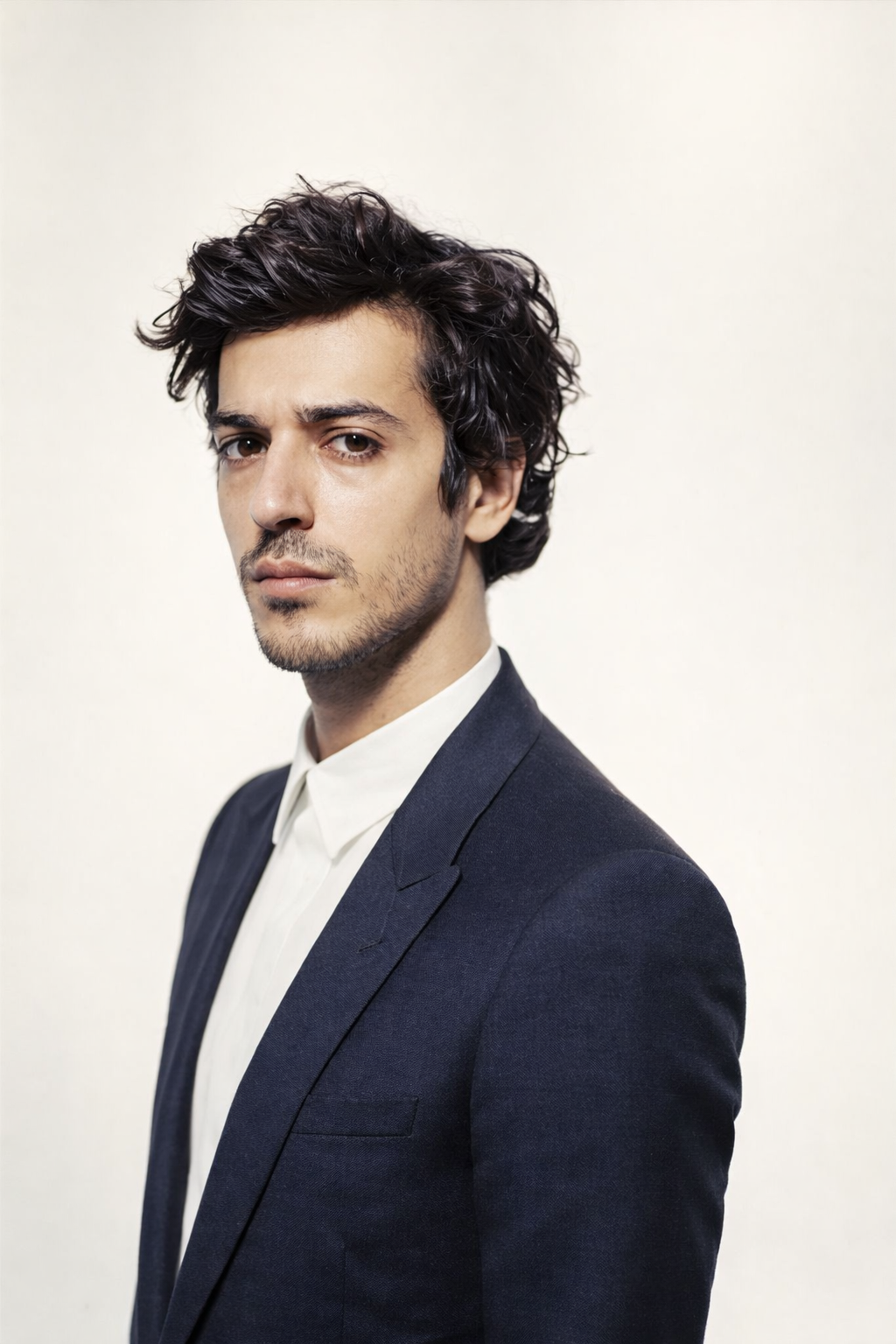
- Gesaffelstein in 2013
- Studio albums: 3
- EPs: 9
- Soundtrack albums: 1
- Live albums: 1
- Singles: 7
- Promotional singles: 2

The discography of French record producer Gesaffelstein consists of three studio albums, one live album, one soundtrack album, nine extended plays (EPs), seven singles, and two promotional singles.

== Studio albums ==
| Title | Details | Chart positions | | | | | | |
| Title | Details | FRA | BEL (Fl) | BEL (Wa) | SWI | UK Dance | US Dance | US Heat. |
|---|---|---|---|---|---|---|---|---|
| Aleph | Released: 28 October 2013; Label: Parlophone, OWSLA; Formats: CD, LP, digital download | 30 | 77 | 66 | 95 | 17 | 16 | 50 |
| Hyperion | Released: 8 March 2019; Label: Columbia; Formats: CD, digital download | 92 | — | — | — | 19 | 1 | |
| Gamma | Released: 29 March 2024; Label: Columbia; Formats: LP, digital download | — | — | — | — | — | — | — |
"—" denotes items which did not chart in that country.

== Live albums ==
| Title | Details |
|---|---|
| Enter the Gamma (Live) | Released: 23 January 2026; Label: Columbia |

== Soundtracks ==
| Title | Details |
|---|---|
| Maryland (Disorder): Original Motion Picture Soundtrack | Released: 11 September 2015; Label: Parlophone, Warner Music France |

== Extended plays ==
| Title | Details |
|---|---|
| Modern Walk | Released: 25 June 2008; Label: PIAS Recordings |
| Vengeance Factory | Released: 2008; Label: OD Records |
| The Operator | Released: 2009; Label: Zone |
| Variations | Released: 2010; Label: Turbo |
| Conspiracy Pt. I | Released: 2011; Label: Turbo |
| Conspiracy Pt. II | Released: 2011; Label: Turbo |
| Zone 4: Crainte / Errance | Released: 2011; Label: Zone |
| Bromance #4: Rise of Depravity | Released: 2012; Label: Bromance Records |
| Novo Sonic System | Released: 4 October 2019; Label: Columbia |

== Singles ==
=== As lead artist ===
List of singles as lead artist, with selected chart positions and certifications
| Title | Year | Chart positions | | | | | | | | | | Certifications | Album |
| Title | Year | FRA | AUS | BEL (Fl) | CAN | DEN | GER | NLD | SWE | UK | US | Certifications | Album |
|---|---|---|---|---|---|---|---|---|---|---|---|---|---|
| "Pursuit" | 2013 | 96 | — | — (Note: "Pursuit" did not enter the Ultratop 50 chart, but peaked at number 83 on the Ultratip chart.) | — | — | — | — | — | — | — | | Aleph |
| "Hate or Glory" | 2013 | — | — | — | — | — | — | — | — | — | — | | Aleph |
| "Conquistador" (with Jean-Michel Jarre) | 2015 | — | — | — | — | — | — | — | — | — | — | | Electronica 1: The Time Machine |
| "Reset" | 2018 | — | — | — | — | — | — | — | — | — | — | | Hyperion |
| "Lost in the Fire" (with the Weeknd) | 2019 | 78 | 24 | 43 | 14 | 17 | 49 | 60 | 9 | 9 | 27 | SNEP: Diamond; ARIA: 3× Platinum; BPI: Platinum; MC: Platinum; RIAA: 2× Platinum | Hyperion |
| "Blast Off" (with Pharrell Williams) | 2019 | — | — | — | — | — | — | — | — | — | — | | Hyperion |
| "Hard Dreams" (with Yan Wagner) | 2024 | — | — | — | — | — | — | — | — | — | — | | Gamma |
| "OPR" (live) | 2025 | — | — | — | — | — | — | — | — | — | — | | Enter the Gamma |
"—" denotes items which did not chart in that country.

=== Promotional singles ===
List of promotional singles, with selected chart positions
| Title | Year | Chart positions | Album |
| Title | Year | US Club | Album |
|---|---|---|---|
| "In Distress" (A$AP Rocky featuring Gesaffelstein) | 2014 | — | Divergent: Original Motion Picture Soundtrack |
| "A Palé" (Gesaffelstein remix) (with Rosalía) | 2020 | 30 | Non-album promotional single |
"—" denotes items which did not chart in that country.

== Other charted and certified songs ==
List of other charted songs, with selected chart positions
| Title | Year | Chart positions | | | | | | | | | | Certifications | Album |
| Title | Year | FRA | AUS | CAN | GER | SWE | UK Stream | US | US Dance Elec. | US Dance Pop | WW | Certifications | Album |
|---|---|---|---|---|---|---|---|---|---|---|---|---|---|
| "Aleph" | 2013 | 200 | — | — | — | — | — | — | — | — | — | | Aleph |
| "I Was Never There" (The Weeknd featuring Gesaffelstein) | 2018 | 112 | 40 | 12 | 91 | 40 | 42 | 35 | — | — | 119 | SNEP: Platinum; ARIA: 2× Platinum; BPI: Platinum; MC: Gold; RIAA: Platinum | My Dear Melancholy |
| "Hurt You" (The Weeknd featuring Gesaffelstein) | 2018 | 103 | 37 | 17 | 85 | 33 | 45 | 43 | — | — | — | SNEP: Gold; ARIA: 2× Platinum; BPI: Silver; MC: Gold; RIAA: Platinum | My Dear Melancholy |
| "So Bad" (featuring Haim) | 2019 | — | — | — | — | — | — | — | 50 | — | — | | Hyperion |
| "BerwynGesaffNeighbours" (with Fred Again and Berwyn) | 2024 | — | — | — | — | — | — | — | 34 | — | — | | USB |
| "Killah" (Lady Gaga featuring Gesaffelstein) | 2025 | 194 | — | 87 | — | — | 82 | 93 | — | 8 | 95 | | Mayhem |
| "Pusher" (Justice with Gesaffelstein) | 2026 | — | — | — | — | — | — | — | — | — | — | | Grand Theft Auto VI: Original Score |
"—" denotes a recording that did not chart or was not released in that territory.

== Other appearances ==
| Title | Year | Album |
|---|---|---|
| "Control Movement" | 2011 | Bromance #1 |
| "Calling from the Stars" (with Miss Kittin) | 2013 | Calling from the Stars |
| "Icia" | 2021 | Interzone |

== Songwriting, production and technical credits ==
| Title | Year | Artist(s) | Album | Occupation(s) |
|---|---|---|---|---|
| "Black Skinhead" | 2013 | Kanye West | Yeezus | Additional producer |
| "Send It Up" | 2013 | Kanye West | Yeezus | Composer, co-producer |
| "The New International Sound" | 2014 | Gener8ion | Homieland, Vol. 1 | Mixer |
| "Euphoria" (featuring Remy Banks) | 2016 | Boys Noize | Mayday | Composer, writer |
| "Fior di Latte" | 2017 | Phoenix | Ti Amo | Assistance |
| "Jesus Lord" | 2021 | Kanye West | Donda | Composer, producer |
| "No Child Left Behind" | 2021 | Kanye West | Donda | Composer, producer |
| "Jesus Lord Pt 2" | 2021 | Kanye West | Donda | Composer, producer |
| "Okay!" | 2022 | KayCyy | TW20 50 | Composer, producer |
| "The Sun" | 2022 | KayCyy | TW20 50 | Composer, producer |
| "Love & Hate" | 2022 | KayCyy | TW20 50 | Composer, producer |
| "To All the People" | 2023 | Jain | The Fool | Producer |
| "Roll the Dice" | 2023 | KayCyy | TW20 52 | Composer, producer |
| "Ashley's Heartbeat" | 2023 | KayCyy | TW20 52 | Composer, producer |
| "TImeless" | 2023 | KayCyy | TW20 52 | Composer, producer |
| "No Cold" | 2023 | KayCyy | TW20 52 | Composer, producer |
| "J Christ" | 2024 | Lil Nas X | Non-album single | Composer, producer |
| "I Might Say Something Stupid" | 2024 | Charli XCX | Brat | Composer, producer |
| "B2B" | 2024 | Charli XCX | Brat | Composer, producer |
| "What's the Cure?" | 2024 | Yodelice | What's the Cure? | Composer |
| "Garden of Eden" | 2025 | Lady Gaga | Mayhem | Composer, producer |
| "Perfect Celebrity" | 2025 | Lady Gaga | Mayhem | Composer |
| "Blade of Grass" | 2025 | Lady Gaga | Mayhem | Composer, producer |

== Remixes ==
| Track | Year | Artist(s) | Title |
|---|---|---|---|
| "So Glad" | 2009 | I Am the Cosmos | Gesaffelstein Remix |
| "Lump" | 2009 | Franz & Shape | Gesaffelstein Remix |
| "Les Enfants" | 2010 | Cassius | Gesaffelstein Remix |
| "Body of Eyes" | 2010 | Sei A | Gesaffelstein Violation Remix |
| "Heliochrome" | 2010 | Chateau Marmont | Gesaffelstein Remix |
| "New Disco Beat" | 2010 | David Carretta | Gesaffelstein Remix |
| "What's the Point" | 2010 | Ali Renault | Gesaffelstein Remix |
| "All You Need" | 2011 | Miss Kittin | Gesaffelstein Remix |
| "ZZafrika" | 2011 | ZZT | Gesaffelstein Remix |
| "The Day" | 2011 | Moby | Gesaffelstein Remix |
| "All You Need Is Techno" | 2011 | Arnaud Rebotini | Gesaffelstein Remix |
| "Speechless" (featuring Carl Craig & La Scalars) | 2011 | Agoria | Gesaffelstein Remix |
| "Big Bad Wolf" | 2011 | Duck Sauce | Gesaffelstein Remix |
| "Hilinner" | 2011 | Crackboy | Gesaffelstein Remix |
| "Blue Jeans" | 2012 | Lana Del Rey | Gesaffelstein Remix |
| "Lemonade" | 2012 | Boys Noize & Erol Alkan | Gesaffelstein Remix |
| "Shockwave" | 2012 | The Hacker | Gesaffelstein Remix |
| "Indigo" | 2012 | Azari & III | Gesaffelstein Remix |
| "Cover Your Eyes" (featuring Wave Machines) | 2012 | The Shoes | Gesaffelstein Remix |
| "Rocket Number 9" | 2012 | Zombie Zombie | Gesaffelstein Remix |
| "The Black Brad Pitt" (featuring Danny Brown) | 2012 | Evil Nine | Gesaffelstein Remix |
| "Aftermaths" | 2012 | VCMG | Gesaffelstein Remix |
| "Helix" | 2013 | Justice | Gesaffelstein Vision Remix |
| "Jacques in the Box" | 2013 | Laurent Garnier | Brodinski & Gesaffelstein Dirty Sprite Remix |
| "Goodbye" | 2013 | Depeche Mode | Gesaffelstein Remix |
| "One Hundred Realities" | 2013 | Chateau Marmont | Gesaffelstein Remix |
| "Bankrupt!" | 2014 | Phoenix | Gesaffelstein Remix |
| "Hate or Glory" | 2014 | Gesaffelstein | Gesaffelstein Remix |
| "A palé" | 2019 | Rosalía | Gesaffelstein Remix |
| "Never Come Back" | 2024 | KaS Product | Gesaffelstein & The Hacker Remix |
| "Abracadabra" | 2025 | Lady Gaga | Gesaffelstein Remix |
