= Last Thing You Need =

2026 single by Morgan Wallen

Single by Morgan Wallen

from the album Grand Theft Auto VI: The Album
- Released: September 17, 2026
- Recorded: 2026
- Genre: Pop; R&B
- Length: 3:16
- Label: Atlantic; Take-Two Interactive
- Songwriters: Morgan Wallen; John Byron; Chase McGill; Blake Pendergrass; Ryan Vojtesak
- Producers: Joey Moi; Charlie Handsome

Morgan Wallen singles chronology
"Been By Now" (2026)	"Last Thing You Need" (2026)

Audio video
- "Last Thing You Need" on YouTube

"Last Thing You Need" is a song by American country music singer Morgan Wallen. It was released on September 17, 2026, as one of six advance singles from Grand Theft Auto VI: The Album, the official soundtrack album for the video game Grand Theft Auto VI. The song was written by Wallen, John Byron, Chase McGill, Blake Pendergrass, and Ryan Vojtesak, and produced by Joey Moi and Charlie Handsome.

== Background and release ==
"Last Thing You Need" was written in early 2026 by Wallen and his team and was initially intended for his upcoming fifth studio album. Co-writer Blake Pendergrass said that the song was written during the album's recording sessions. When the team was approached about contributing to the Grand Theft Auto VI soundtrack, they selected the song because they felt it best suited the game.

Wallen and other artists began simultaneously teasing their involvement on September 15, 2026, through their social media accounts by sharing a still image from Grand Theft Auto VI depicting a pool with figures enjoying the sun. "Last Thing You Need" was released on September 17, 2026, alongside five other advance singles from Grand Theft Auto VI: The Album: "That's It" by Yung Lean featuring Future and Metro Boomin, "Rhyno" by Travis Scott, "Sexy Magic" by Ca7riel & Paco Amoroso, PinkPantheress, Fred Again, and Étienne de Crécy, "Macacoa 2000" by Rauw Alejandro, and "Bright Lights, Big City" by Keith Richards. The songs are intended to represent the fictional settings of Vice City and Leonida, while also introducing new artists to the game's audience.

== Composition ==
The song was written by Wallen alongside John Byron, Chase McGill, Blake Pendergrass, and Ryan Vojtesak, better known professionally as Charlie Handsome, with production handled by Joey Moi and Handsome. Musically and lyrically, the song was compared to Wallen's previous singles, including "Been By Now", albeit with a little more twang. It features a "synth-backed, pop-driven sound" described as capturing the game's "Miami-inspired vibe", while continuing Wallen's "pop and R&B direction".

The song revolves around an "on-and-off" relationship in which both partners recognize that they are incompatible, but remain together due to their "sexual chemistry". They agree to spend one final night together, before the narrator declares that he will always be willing to spend one more night with her. Co-writer Blake Pendergrass likened the song's storyline to the relationship between Jason Duval and Lucia Caminos, the protagonists of the game.

== Charts ==
Chart performance for "Last Thing You Need"
Chart (2026)	Peak position
Canada Hot 100 (Billboard)	12
Canada Country (Billboard)	43
Global 200 (Billboard)	29
New Zealand Hot Singles (RMNZ)	3
Norway (IFPI Norge)	84
UK Singles (Official Charts)	74
US Billboard Hot 100	9
US Country Airplay (Billboard)	24
US Hot Country Songs (Billboard)	4
