= Homem Cristo Filho =

Portuguese writer and journalist (1892–1928)

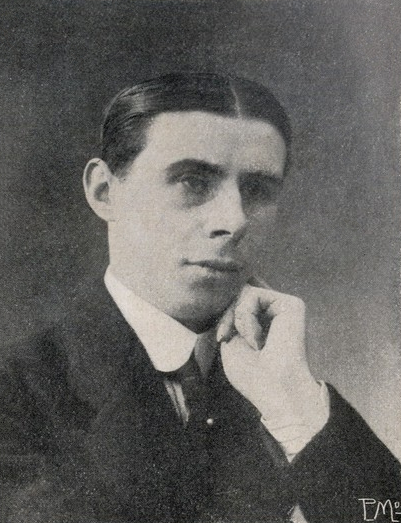
- Born: Francisco Manuel Homem Cristo; 5 March 1892; Lisbon
- Died: 12 June 1928 (aged 36); Rome
- Occupations: Writer, journalist

Francisco Manuel Homem Cristo (5 March 1892 — 12 June 1928), better known as Homem Cristo Filho, was a Portuguese writer and journalist who advocated for monarchist and nationalist movements that later led him to Italian fascism, of which he was a fervent admirer, and to various forms of European nationalism. He founded and edited the magazine Ideia Nacional and the newspaper Restauração.

== Biography ==
Because he was the son of Francisco Manuel Homem Cristo, the owner of a newspaper publishing company in Aveiro, Homem Cristo Filho, as he was referred to, began working there. He later distinguished himself in Coimbra, where he founded the weekly newspaper A Verdade. At that time, he was a follower of anarchist ideas, even before the Establishment of the Republic, which forced him to flee to Brazil; after 1910, he joined the Monarchist Cause. He had been expelled from Portugal after participating in the failed Revolta da Água-Pé, which forced him into exile in France, where he would go on to enjoy great prestige.

In 1914, Homem Cristo Filho founded the newspaper A Restauração and later the magazine A Ideia Nacional. He also published several works in French, such as Le Portugal contre l’Allemagne (1918), Le Cinema des Jours (1918), and Les Porte-Flambeaux (1920).

In 1926, after identifying himself as a nationalist and counterrevolutionary, he returned to Portugal, where he founded another periodical that same year, Informação, and served as its editor. As a writer, he published primarily novels, essays, and short stories. Due to his political views, he was exiled from Portugal in his later years.

With the rise of fascism, Homem Cristo Filho became a great admirer and personal friend of Benito Mussolini, and therefore published Mussolini, Baptizer of the Future in 1923, a piece of work translated into several languages, which advocated a union of the Latin peoples influenced by Italian fascism.

Homem Cristo Filho died in Rome on 12 June 1928, as a result of a car accident. On 9 February 1933, his remains were transferred to a monumental tomb, which had been built by the governor of Rome, by the orders of Mussolini. His memorial ceremony was attended by his son, Paulo, who was studying at the Caserta Military Aviation Academy, as well as the governor of Rome, and the Portuguese minister to the Holy See.

He was the great-grandfather of Guy-Manuel de Homem-Christo, one half of the former electronic music duo Daft Punk, and of the Portuguese politician Alexandre Homem Cristo.
