= Free Spirits (Ca7riel & Paco Amoroso album) =

Studio album by Ca7riel & Paco Amoroso
- Released: 19 March 2026
- Genre: Latin
- Length: 38:14
- Label: 5020
- Producers: Sting; Anderson .Paak; Babyboom; Boo; Federico Vindver; Fred Again; J-Mo; J.Lbs; Rafa Arcaute

Ca7riel & Paco Amoroso chronology
Papota (2025)	Free Spirits (2026)

Singles from Free Spirits
- 1. "No Me Sirve Más (Note: Previously titled "Gimme More".)" Released: 18 November 2025; 2. "Hasta Jesús Tuvo un Mal Día" Released: 12 February 2026; 3. "Goo Goo Ga Ga" Released: 12 March 2026

Free Spirits is the second studio album by Argentine duo Ca7riel & Paco Amoroso, released on 19 March 2026 via 5020 Records. A follow-up to their first extended play / second live album Papota, it features guest appearances from Jack Black, Anderson .Paak, Sting and Fred Again, alongside production from Anderson .Paak, Fred Again, Federico Vindver and Rafa Arcaute, among others.

Initially titled Top of the Hills and announced after the 26th Annual Latin Grammy Awards in November 2025, the album was delayed and later cancelled due to a swift and a sudden breakdown. In February 2026, the duo announced their new album Free Spirits in a video teased via social media, named after Sting's fictional wellness center of the same name. To promote the album, the duo are set to embark in a world tour from May to November 2026.

The album was supported by three singles: "No Me Sirve Más", "Hasta Jesús Tuvo un Mal Día" and "Goo Goo Ga Ga". Free Spirits was met with generally favorable reviews from critics.

== Background ==
Following the release of their extended play / live album Papota, Ca7riel and Paco Amoroso embarked on a 60-date world tour spanning four continents as well as a performance at Coachella 2025 and at The Tonight Show Starring Jimmy Fallon. In late 2025, the duo opened for the Latin American shows of American rapper Kendrick Lamar's Grand National Tour. In November 2025, they performed in Basel, Switzerland at the Baloise Session.

After winning five Latin Grammys in November 2025, the duo announced their upcoming second studio album, titled Top of the Hills. However, only a few weeks later in late December 2025, they shared on social media that they had made the decision to postpone their new album due to exhaustion from constant touring. The album will now be released sometime in early 2026.

In February 2026, a video appeared in their social media profiles featuring Sting, where he talks about how he took them under his wing and how Top of the Hills was cancelled because they suffered a "swift and sudden breakdown." This video is a presentation for their new studio album, Free Spirits, named after Sting's fictional wellness center in the video. With the release of this video, the release date of the album was revealed, and it will be released on March 19, 2026. Six days later, a collaborative song between Ca7riel y Paco Amoroso and Sting was released, named "HASTA JESÚS TUVO UN MAL DÍA".

== Promotion ==
To promote the album, the duo released the lead single "Gimme More" (Note: Later titled "No Me Sirve Más".) in November 2025 after their success at the 26th Annual Latin Grammy Awards. In February 2026, following the cancellation of Top of the Hills, they released the second single off Free Spirits, "Hasta Jesús Tuvo un Mal Día", which features the Police member Sting. In March 2026, they released the final single of the album, "Goo Goo Ga Ga", featuring actor and comedy rock musician Jack Black. The duo are also set to embark on a world tour that would take place from May to November 2026 across South America, North America and Europe.

== Critical reception ==
Professional ratings
Aggregate scores
Source	Rating
Metacritic	76/100
Review scores
Source	Rating
NME	4/5 stars
Pitchfork	7.8/10
Rolling Stone	3/5 stars

The album received generally favorable reviews from critics, based on a score of 76/100 and four reviews according to review aggregator Metacritic.

Writing for Pitchfork, Maria Nenet Barrios said about the album: "The lust, greed, excess, and anxiety that they grappled with on PAPOTA are still there, but this time, the atmosphere doesn’t feel as friendly or accessible. Splayed out across Bulgarian folk music, trance beats, bruxaria atmospheres, samba, and even bits of nueva ola, Free Spirits feels dialed all the way up." Billboard's Isabela Raygoza wrote about the album: "Following the explosive success of their Grammy-winning Papota, the 12-track adventure of Free Spirits doubles down on CA7RIEL y Paco Amoroso’s cheeky genre-bending vision, pushing further into chaos, humor, emotional introspection and their unrestrained lust for life. With collaborations spanning Sting, Anderson .Paak, Jack Black and Fred again.., the album feels like both an intrepid statement and an intimate self-portrait — an ode to their untouchable improvisational spark and newfound fame."

NME's Sara Delgado wrote that the album is "fun and frenetic but lacks the instant stickiness of their debut and could use fewer Anglo features as glue. CA7RIEL & Paco Amoroso have described ‘Free Spirits’ as “complex, fun, honest, with a little bit of everything” – and sonically it lives up to its name, revelling in being unconstrained, even if it's lyrically all over the place." Variety 's Jem Aswad wrote that "Free Spirits is a wild progression that finds them zipping from one style to another with a fluidity that's as focused as it is head-spinning." On a mixed review for Rolling Stone, Ernesto Lechner gave a score of three out of five stars and said that "it's the message underneath the layers of aural candy chaos that feels a bit slipshod."

== Track listing ==
Free Spirits track listing
No.	Title	Writer(s)	Producer(s)	Length
1.	"Nada Nuevo"	Catriel Guerreiro; Ulises Guerriero; Rafa Arcaute; Federico Vindver; Gino the Ghost; Vibarco	Arcaute; Vindver	2:56
2.	"Goo Goo Ga Ga" (featuring Jack Black)	C. Guerreiro; U. Guerriero; Black; Vibarco; Gino the Ghost; Amanda Ibanez; Arcaute	Vindver; Arcaute	3:11
3.	"No Me Sirve Más"	C. Guerreiro; U. Guerriero; Vindver; Arcaute; Gino the Ghost; Vibarco	Vindver; Arcaute	3:04
4.	"Ay Ay Ay" (featuring Anderson .Paak)	C. Guerreiro; U. Guerriero; Brandon Anderson; Vindver; Arcaute; Vibarco; Jairus Mozee; Jason Pounds	Vindver; Arcaute; Anderson .Paak; J.Lbs; J-Mo	3:01
5.	"Vida Loca"	C. Guerreiro; U. Guerriero; Ibanez; Vindver; Luca Oliva Knight; Arcaute; Tomás Susevich; Vibarco	Babyboom; Vindver; Arcaute	2:35
6.	"Muero"	C. Guerreiro; U. Guerriero; Sabrian Sledge; Fred Gibson; Vibarco; Vindver; Benjy Gibson; Henrik Schwarz; Emmanuel Jal	Boo; Fred Again; Vindver	3:49
7.	"Hasta Jesús Tuvo un Mal Día" (featuring Sting)	C. Guerreiro; U. Guerriero; Gordon Sumner; Vindver; Vibarco; Renee Barri; John Ryan; Martin Kierszenbaum; Arcaute; Jey One	Vindver; Arcaute	3:14
8.	"Ha Ha"	C. Guerreiro; U. Guerriero; Vindver; Arcaute; Vibarco; Gino the Ghost	Vindver; Arcaute	3:07
9.	"Soy Increíble"	C. Guerreiro; U. Guerriero; Vindver; Vibarco; Zacari Pacaldo; Arcaute	Vindver; Arcaute	3:07
10.	"Himno del Mediocre"	C. Guerreiro; U. Guerriero; Vindver; Arcaute; Vibarco; Gino the Ghost	Vindver; Arcaute	2:35
11.	"Todo Ray"	C. Guerreiro; U. Guerriero; Pacaldo; Vindver; Arcaute; Vibarco	Vindver; Arcaute	3:14
12.	"Lo Quiero Ya!" (featuring Fred Again)	C. Guerreiro; U. Guerriero; F. Gibson; B. Gibson; Sledge; Vindver; Petar Lyondev; Stijn Schrijber; Vibarco	Fred Again; Boo; Vindver	3:17
Total length:				38:14

=== Notes ===
- "Hasta Jesús Tuvo un Mal Día" features samples from "Roxanne", written by Sting and performed by The Police.

== Charts ==
Chart performance for Free Spirits
Chart (2026)	Peak position
Japanese Top Albums Sales (Billboard Japan)	74
US Latin Pop Albums (Billboard)	11
