= Suzuki (song) =

2026 single by Fuerza Regida

Single by Fuerza Regida

from the album Grand Theft Auto VI: The Album
- Language: Spanish
- Released: October 8, 2026
- Genre: Reggaeton
- Length: 1:51
- Label: Sony Latin
- Songwriters: Jesús Ortíz Paz; Diego Armando Millan; Jonathan Caro; Oswaldo Yahir López; Carlos Daniel Gutierrez; Javier Mercado; Garrison Webster
- Producer: Synthetic

Fuerza Regida singles chronology
| "Todos nos Shipean" (2026) | "Suzuki" (2026) | "Olimpo" (2026) |

"Suzuki" is a song by American regional Mexican band Fuerza Regida. It was released on October 8, 2026, by Sony Music Latin, as one of ten supporting singles from Grand Theft Auto VI: The Album, the accompanying soundtrack album to the video game Grand Theft Auto VI (2026).

== Background and release ==
On October 7, 2026, Fuerza Regida posted a video on Instagram, which shows lead vocalist Jesús Ortiz Paz driving a black Ferrari with a custom license plate that reads "Vice City" and "Leonida", hinting their involvement in the video game Grand Theft Auto VI (2026). The band briefly appeared as the main artist for the 10th track from the game's soundtrack's track listing on Spotify days prior.

"Suzuki" was released as one of the two additional singles for Grand Theft Auto VI: The Album, the other being Cardi B's "Don't Chart", on October 8. It is featured in Cocoteo FM, one of several fictional radio stations in Grand Theft Auto VI.

== Critical reception ==
In a collaborative article ranking every track from Grand Theft Auto VI: The Album, Billboard ranked "Suzuki" at number 11, with co-author Isabela Raygoza highlighting the band's shift from their usual corridos to reggaeton textures, calling it "flirtatious" and "raunchy". Ali Shutler from NME ranked it at number 26 in their own ranking, stating that the song's "sleek" sound and short length shows "the sign of true masters of work". Mark Kennedy from the Associated Press called it "hypnotic".

== Charts ==
Chart performance for "Suzuki"
| Chart (2026) | Peak position |
|---|---|
| Bolivia (Billboard) | 4 |
| Chile (Billboard) | 12 |
| Ecuador (Billboard) | 3 |
| Ecuador Streaming (Promúsica) | 4 |
| Global 200 (Billboard) | 46 |
| Mexico (Billboard) | 1 |
| Mexico Streaming (AMPROFON) | 1 |
| Panama Streaming (PRODUCE) | 101 |
| US Bubbling Under Hot 100 (Billboard) | 5 |
| US Hot Latin Rhythm Songs (Billboard) | 3 |
| US Hot Latin Songs (Billboard) | 4 |
