= Hurt You =

Hurt You may refer to:

- Hurt You (Toni Braxton and Babyface song), 2013
- Hurt You (The Weeknd song), 2018
