= Guy-Manuel de Homem-Christo =

French musician (born 1974)

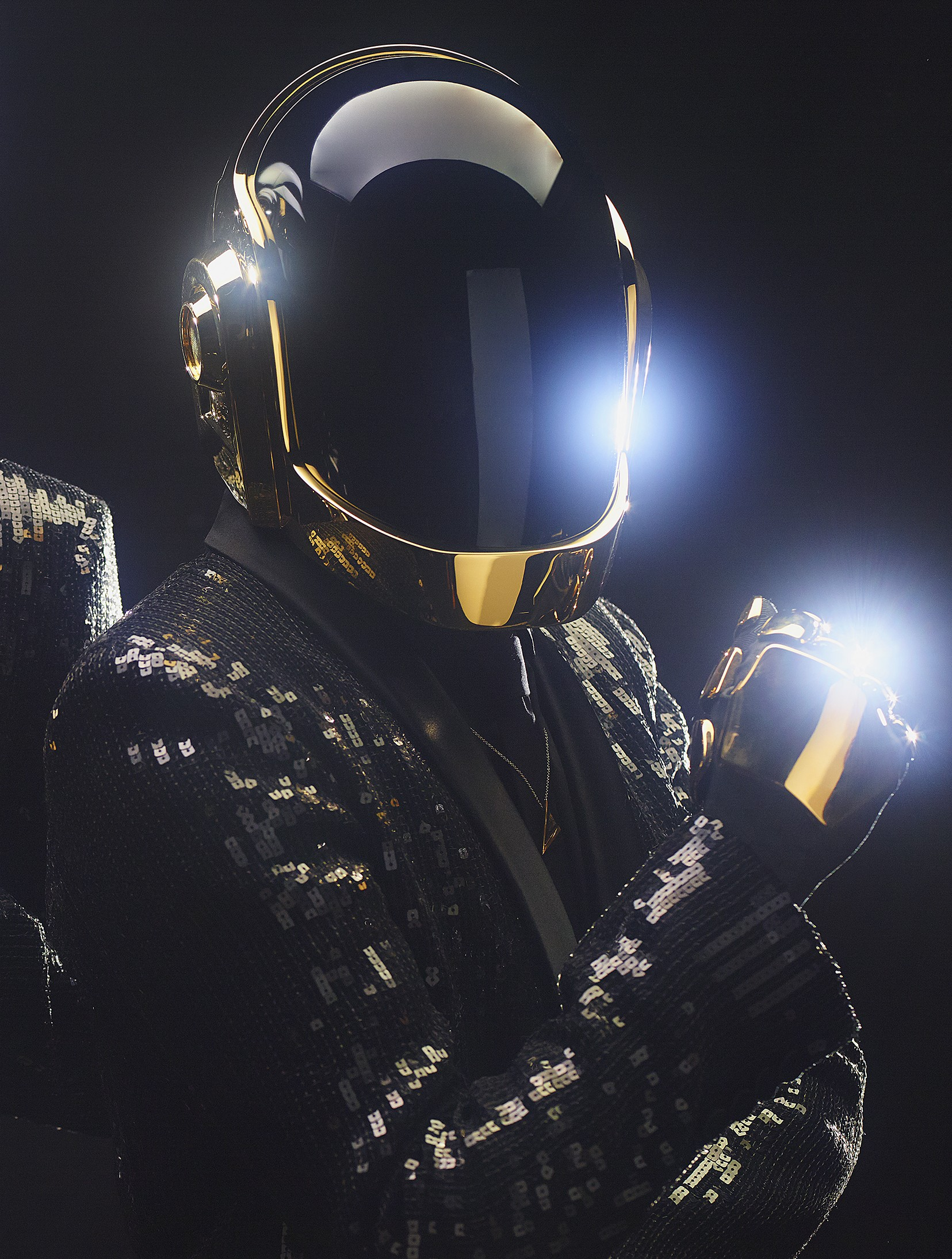
- Homem-Christo as a member of Daft Punk in 2013

Background information
- Born: Guillaume Emmanuel de Homem-Christo; 8 February 1974 (age 52); Neuilly-sur-Seine, Hauts-de-Seine, France
- Origin: Paris, France
- Genres: House; electronic; dance; disco
- Occupations: Musician; record producer; disc jockey; composer
- Instruments: Guitar; synthesizer; drums; keyboards; bass guitar; programming; vocals
- Years active: 1992–present
- Label: Crydamoure
- Formerly of: Darlin'; Daft Punk; Le Knight Club; Crydajam

Guillaume Emmanuel "Guy-Manuel" de Homem-Christo (French pronunciation: [ɡijom emanɥɛl də ɔmɛm kʁisto], [ɡi manɥɛl]; born 8 February 1974) is a French musician, record producer, and composer. He is best known as one-half of former French electronic music duo Daft Punk, alongside Thomas Bangalter. Between 1997 and 2015, Homem-Christo was a member of the electronic duo Le Knight Club with Éric Chedeville. The duo released two albums together, and they operated the now-defunct record label Crydamoure.

Homem-Christo's discography as a producer and songwriter includes work by Sébastien Tellier, Charlotte Gainsbourg, The Weeknd and Rosalía. He co-wrote and produced "Nightcall" by Kavinsky; the song was performed live at the closing ceremony of the 2024 Paris Summer Olympics in August 2024. In 2023, he helped write and produce the track "Modern Jam" for the American rapper Travis Scott. In 2026, he again collaborated with Scott on the track "Rhyno", one out of multiple advance singles from the soundtrack for the video game Grand Theft Auto VI.

As a member of Daft Punk, Homem-Christo only made public appearances wearing a robot mask, a signature of the band. Since the group's disbandment in 2021, he has not made any public appearances or released solo material; in 2023, he did an interview for the 10th anniversary of Random Access Memories with Thomas Bangalter and other collaborators.

== Early life ==
Guillaume Emmanuel de Homem-Christo was born on 8 February 1974 in Neuilly-sur-Seine, Hauts-de-Seine, France. His parents, Didier and Anne-Marie, owned and ran an advertising company together in Paris, and his father gained an appreciation for music by playing rock bands and records such as Led Zeppelin and the Eagles' "Hotel California" every Sunday, exposing Homem-Christo to Western rock influences from a young age.

Homem-Christo has Portuguese ancestry, and he is the great-grandson of Portuguese poet Homem Cristo Filho, as well as the great-great-grandson of Portuguese military figure Francisco Manuel Homem Cristo, who was forced into exile in France in 1910. He has a younger brother, Paul, who is also a producer and DJ who goes under the name Play Paul.

Homem-Christo was given a toy guitar and keyboard at around age 7. He was also given an electric guitar at age 14; he still uses a guitar when writing music.

== Career ==
=== 1987–2000: Early years and Daft Punk formation ===
In 1987, Homem-Christo met Thomas Bangalter when they attended the Lycée Carnot secondary school in Paris. It was from there that they discovered their mutual fascination for films and music of the 1960s and 1970s: "very basic cult teenager things, from Easy Rider to the Velvet Underground". The two and Laurent Brancowitz eventually joined to form an indie rock trio called Darlin', in which Homem-Christo performed guitar. Bangalter felt that "It was still maybe more a teenage thing at that time. It's like, you know, everybody wants to be in a band." A negative review referred to their music as "a daft punky thrash", which inspired Bangalter and Homem-Christo's new name. The two soon became interested in electronic dance music after going to a club in 1992. Homem-Christo is credited for designing the Daft Punk logo in the liner notes of Homework (1997), the duo's first album.

Regarding Daft Punk's creative process and working with Bangalter, Homem-Christo commented that "he's much more of the tech guy than I am. We did everything together. But I have more distance". He added, "I'm more critical of everything we do. We're two-halves of one solid combination. There's balance there – completeness between us, yeah".

Homem-Christo is a co-founder of the group Le Knight Club, along with Éric Chedeville from Pumpking Records. They were also the founders of former record label Crydamoure, until it became defunct in 2003. The label's name, Crydamoure, is named after a variation of the French phrase "cri d'amour" or "cry of love" in English. Crydamoure published works by Homem-Christo's brother Paul, under the name Play Paul. They also published records by Deelat, Raw Man, The Eternals, and many others. In regards to Crydamoure, Homem-Christo stated:

Myself and Thomas have the same tastes in music. When I make records for Crydamoure it's a different style than what may end up as Daft Punk music. I know what Thomas likes, and he knows what I like. Crydamoure is not so production oriented, even if it's not too far from Daft Punk. The Daft Punk material is more orchestrated and slightly different. I may be working on a sample for Crydamoure, and maybe no one else can hear the difference, but we know. It's very precise.

=== 2000–2020: Further Daft Punk productions and musical activities ===
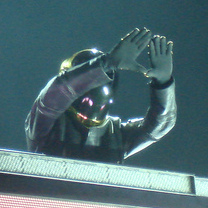
Homem-Christo performing as a member of Daft Punk at the Alive 2007 tour

Daft Punk produced three projects in the 2000s, their sophomore album Discovery (2001), their third album Human After All (2005), and the soundtrack to Tron: Legacy (2010). The duo also did a world tour in 2006 and 2007, eventually releasing an accompanying live album, Alive 2007.

In between these projects, Homem-Christo produced Sébastien Tellier's 2008 album Sexuality. He also has one cameo for each track, 'Kilometer' and 'Divine'. In 2010, Homem-Christo and Bangalter were admitted into the Ordre des Arts et des Lettres, an order of merit of France. The two were individually awarded the rank of Chevalier (knight). Homem-Christo also worked with Sebastian on the Kavinsky song "Nightcall", released in 2010. In 2012, he was featured on Tellier's album My God Is Blue on the track "My Poseidon".

Following the release of Daft Punk's fourth and final album Random Access Memories in 2013, Homem-Christo and Bangalter collaborated on two tracks with Canadian artist the Weeknd, "Starboy" and "I Feel It Coming" in 2016, with the former gaining the duo their first number one on the Billboard Hot 100 and the latter, co-written by Chedeville of Le Knight Club, peaking at number four. Homem-Christo and Bangalter both contributed writing and production credits to the 2017 song "Overnight" by Parcels. This would be Daft Punk's final main production work as a duo, as Daft Punk would go on to be largely inactive and eventually disband.

Homem-Christo worked on the title track to Charlotte Gainsbourg's fifth studio album Rest, released in 2017. He contributed to the 2018 song "Hurt You", a collaboration with the Weeknd and Gesaffelstein.

In 2020, during the COVID-19 pandemic, Homem-Christo created a curated playlist called "Star of a hero" for Italian brand Medea, containing tracks from The Beach Boys, the Weeknd, George Duke, and Thundercat, among others.

=== 2021–present: Daft Punk disbandment and further activities ===
On 22 February 2021, Daft Punk released a video on their YouTube channel titled "Epilogue", featuring an excerpt from their 2006 film Electroma, in which one robot self-destructs and the other walks away, as their song "Touch" plays over a sunset sequence, indicating their disbandment after 28 years. Daft Punk's long-time publicist Kathryn Frazier later confirmed that the duo had split up. Friend and collaborator Todd Edwards later clarified that Bangalter and Homem-Christo remain active separately. The two still share a studio and equipment.

In July 2023, American rapper Travis Scott released "Modern Jam," written and produced by Homem-Christo, from his album Utopia. This was recognized as one of Homem-Christo's first musical contributions since the disbandment of Daft Punk. In November 2025, Spanish singer Rosalía released "Reliquia," co-written by Homem-Christo, from her album Lux. In September 2026, Scott released a track co-written and produced by Homem-Christo titled "Rhyno" for the album to the video game Grand Theft Auto VI.

== Personal life ==
Homem-Christo has two children, a daughter and a son. He and his wife divorced in 2010.

Homem-Christo has no interest in being a celebrity or discussing his private life. Even though his former bandmate Thomas Bangalter had started making more public appearances in the years after Daft Punk's disbandment, Homem-Christo remains largely out of the spotlight. During Bangalter and Homem-Christo's tenure as Daft Punk, in the rare events of interviews, Bangalter did the majority of talking to journalists.

With regard to working and collaborating with other artists, Homem-Christo sees it as a matter of timing and creativity, rather than fame and opportunity. He once stated in an interview:

Well that depends on what we want to do at the time. It depends. I don't know ... it just depends on the moment you're asked. If you feel it and if you feel something creatively interesting then it's possible. For everything that we're asked to do, if we have a creative answer and think we might bring something to a project then we can do it. But if we don't have any ideas or don't think we can push the envelope by creating with anybody ... well, if you take Sébastien Tellier for example it is one of the few collaborations where I had the idea that I could do something and bring something to it. But it's all about the moment and the situation. When it feels right to us, when we feel it we do it, and when we have the time. There's so many factors.

== Discography ==
=== Production credits ===
==== Albums ====
- Waves (2000)
- Waves II (2003)
- Sexuality by Sébastien Tellier (2008)

==== Tracks ====
Year	Title	Artist	Album	Credit(s)	Notes
2006	"See Me Now"	Cassius	15 Again	Composer, producer	Produced with Éric Chedeville [credited as Le Knight Club]
2008	"Divine"	Sébastien Tellier	Sexuality	Composer, producer	Produced with Éric Chedeville
2009	"Kilometer"	Sébastien Tellier	Sexuality	Composer, producer	Produced with Éric Chedeville
2010	"Nightcall"	Kavinsky	OutRun	Composer, producer	Produced with Kavinsky
2012	"My Poseidon"	Sébastien Tellier	My God Is Blue	Composer	
2017	"Rest"	Charlotte Gainsbourg	Rest	Composer, producer	
2018	"Hurt You" (featuring Gesaffelstein)	The Weeknd	My Dear Melancholy	Composer, producer	Produced with Gesaffelstein
2023	"Modern Jam" (featuring Teezo Touchdown)	Travis Scott	Utopia	Composer, producer	Produced with Travis Scott
2025	"Reliquia"	Rosalía	Lux	Composer	
2026	"Rhyno"	Travis Scott	Grand Theft Auto VI: The Album	Composer, producer	
