= Grand Theft Auto VI: The Album =

Soundtrack album by various artists
- Released: November 20, 2026
- Length: 97:36
- Labels: Atlantic; Take-Two Interactive

Singles from Grand Theft Auto VI: The Album
- 1. "That's It" Released: September 17, 2026; 2. "Rhyno" Released: September 17, 2026; 3. "Sexy Magic" Released: September 17, 2026; 4. "Last Thing You Need" Released: September 17, 2026; 5. "Macacoa 2000" Released: September 17, 2026; 6. "Bright Lights, Big City" Released: September 17, 2026; 7. "Suzuki" Released: October 8, 2026; 8. "Don't Chart" Released: October 8, 2026; 9. "Flower in a Hurricane" Released: October 15, 2026; 10. "Blood in Your Eyes" Released: November 10, 2026

Grand Theft Auto VI: The Album is a soundtrack album for the action-adventure game Grand Theft Auto VI (2026). It was released on November 20, 2026, through Atlantic Records and Take-Two Interactive. The album, which emulates the music of Florida within Grand Theft Auto VI's fictional setting of Leonida, features 34 original tracks from a diverse ensemble of artists including Yung Lean, Travis Scott, Lana Del Rey, Ca7riel & Paco Amoroso, PinkPantheress, Fred Again, Zara Larsson, Dua Lipa and Morgan Wallen, among others. (Note: Attributed to multiple sources:) The album was supported by the release of 10 singles, and a live music festival featuring some of the album's artists was also held on November 21.

== Background ==
Rockstar Games has a history of recording unique compilation albums for their games, beginning with Grand Theft Auto IV and continuing with Grand Theft Auto V and Red Dead Redemption 2. Arca had previously hosted the fictional radio station Motomami Los Santos in Grand Theft Auto Online alongside Rosalía. Lana Del Rey's contribution, "Crazy for You", had previously been unreleased in her catalogue for some years. Many artists on the album have had songs featured in Grand Theft Auto V and Grand Theft Auto Online, including Michael McDonald, (Note: Appearing with the Doobie Brothers. The Doobie Brothers song "China Grove" had previously appeared in Grand Theft Auto IV: The Lost and Damned, however the song predates McDonald joining the band.) Justice, Playboi Carti, Travis Scott, Kodak Black, Young Thug, and Arca.

== Release, promotion, and marketing ==
On September 15, 2026, Travis Scott posted artwork reminiscent of the official art of Grand Theft Auto VI on Instagram, teasing a collaboration with Rockstar Games. Soon after, other artists featured on the album began to post similarly cryptic artwork on their feeds, coinciding with the release of several billboards featuring Vice City-themed artwork branded with the Spotify logo. On September 17, 2026, Rockstar Games formally announced the album. Alongside the announcement, six singles from the album were immediately released on all major streaming platforms.

On October 8, two additional singles from the album were released: "Don't Chart" by Cardi B and "Suzuki" by Fuerza Regida. On October 15, it was announced that electronic duo Justice would be composing the game's original score, coinciding the news with a ninth single, "Flower in a Hurricane". On November 10, to celebrate the game's pre-loading availability, a tenth single, "Blood In Your Eyes" by Tove Lo, was released.

Some artists on the album will appear as themselves in the game as non-player characters or hosts of radio stations. These artists include Lana Del Rey, Morgan Wallen, and Kodak Black. In September, it was announced that the album would be released in both double LP and CD formats. Some critics pointed out the irony of the album receiving physical formats in contrast to the base game not receiving a physical disc at launch. (Note: Attributed to multiple sources:) A limited edition vinyl release, featuring liquid filled discs, sold out almost immediately after its release, with some resellers listing copies for upwards of $440 USD.

=== Grand Theft Auto VI: The Festival ===
A live music festival was hosted by Rockstar Games on November 21 at Mana Wynwood in Miami. The event featured several musicians who appeared on the album, including Travis Scott, Cardi B, Ca7riel & Paco Amoroso, Justice, Metro Boomin, Don Toliver, Kodak Black, Fcukers, and Rauw Alejandro. Other artists who performed but are not on the album include SoFaygo, Nick León, DJ Python, Prospa, Skream, Suero, Tainy, and The Dare.

== Critical reception ==
Grand Theft Auto VI: The Album ratings
Review scores
Source	Rating
Associated Press	3/5 stars
The Times	3/5 stars
Ratings Game Music	4/5 stars
Vice	8/10
Rolling Stone	3.5/5 stars

Reception to the first six singles was generally positive, with Billie Bugara, writing for Pitchfork, describing "That's It" as the most "Floridian" of the releases. Adam Christopher Smith, of Vice, described the soundtrack as a "dazzling arsenal of real-life artists" connecting the game's virtual world to reality, noting that its fantasies of violence and crime depend on a link to "The Real", embodied, according to him, by Travis Scott. Mark Kennedy, of the Associated Press, called the album ambitious, overstuffed, and chaotic, comparing it to a "powerful, impractical and complex" muscle car while highlighting tracks such as "Flower in a Hurricane", "RHYNO", "Sexy Magic", "Power Trip", and "Don't Chart" amid uneven material.

Maura Johnston, of Rolling Stone, likened the album to "a frantic flip through a radio dial", praising both its nods to the 1980s and its broad snapshot of contemporary pop music and hip-hop, singleing out the collaboration "Largate" with Helado Negro and Kali Uchis and the project's status as "one of monoculture's last blockbusters". Similarly, Kory Grow, in the same magazine, commended Keith Richards' version of "Bright Lights, Big City" for imbuing Jimmy Reed's "guitar line with swinging swagger" and his added vocal quiver.

== Track listing ==
Grand Theft Auto VI: The Album track listing
No.	Title	Writer(s)	Producer(s)	Length
1.	"Starting from Zero" (Justice featuring Michael McDonald)	Gaspard Augé; Xavier de Rosnay; Michael McDonald; Dylan McDonald	Justice	3:09
2.	"That's It" (Yung Lean featuring Metro Boomin and Future)	Jonatan Håstad; Leland Wayne; Nayvadius Wilburn; Rami Dawod; Emmanuel Hailemariam	Metro Boomin; Dawod	2:41
3.	"Ahh Yea" (Playboi Carti)	Jordan Carter; Mark Williams; Raul Cubina; Jarrod Morgan; Richard Ortiz; Alain Cartaya; Thomas Ross	Ojivolta; Twisco; F1lthy; Mochillo; Ssor.t	2:00
4.	"Rhyno" (Travis Scott)	Jacques Webster II; Guy-Manuel de Homem-Christo	de Homem-Christo	3:00
5.	"Sexy Magic" (Ca7riel & Paco Amoroso, PinkPantheress, Fred Again and Étienne de Crécy)	Catriel Guerreiro; Vicente Jiménez Gómez; Victoria Walker; Fred Gibson; Étienne de Crécy; Benjy Gibson; Homer Banks; Carl Hampton; Raymond Jackson	Fred Again; Boo	3:15
6.	"Flower in a Hurricane" (Justice featuring Tame Impala, SZA, and King Gizzard & the Lizard Wizard)	Augé; de Rosnay; Kevin Parker; Solána Rowe; Stu Mackenzie; Ambrose Kenny-Smith; Joey Walker; Nicholas Craig; Lucas Harwood; Michael Cavanagh; Sarah Aarons	Justice; Tame Impala	3:41
7.	"Go Easy" (Dua Lipa)	Dua Lipa; Ali Tamposi; Billy Walsh; Andrew Wotman; Henry Walter	Andrew Watt; Cirkut	3:12
8.	"Last Thing You Need" (Morgan Wallen)	Morgan Wallen; John Byron; Chase McGill; Blake Pendergrass; Ryan Vojtesak	Charlie Handsome; Joey Moi	3:16
9.	"X" (Jhayco)	Jesús Nieves; Angel Remigio; Marco Masís; José Toussaint	Jhayco	3:11
10.	"Suzuki" (Fuerza Regida)	Jesús Ortíz Paz; Moisés López; Diego Millán; Jonathan Caro; Oswaldo López; Carlos Gutierrez; Javier Mercado; Garrison Webster	Synthetic	1:53
11.	"Macacoa 2000" (Rauw Alejandro)	Raúl Ocasio; Nino Segara; Jorge Echevarria; Carlos Vega	Ninow	2:55
12.	"Dance with Me" (A Boogie wit da Hoodie featuring Elkan)	Artist Dubose; Paul Elkan	Elkan	2:28
13.	"Bigger" (Burna Boy)	Damini Ogulu; Shama E. Joseph; Dwayne Richard Chin-Quee	Sak Pase	2:49
14.	"Count Up" (Gunna)	Sergio Kitchens; Chandler Great	Turbo	3:01
15.	"Let's Rock" (Kodak Black and Don Toliver)	Bill Kapri; Caleb Toliver; Jacob Canady; RushDee Williams; Jordan Johnson; Derrick Miller; Luther Campbell; Harry Wayne Casey	ATL Jacob; RushDee; Johnson; Hendrix Smoke	2:31
16.	"Wakin Up Flex" (Young Thug)	Jeffrey Williams; Wayne	Metro Boomin	1:56
17.	"IKYFL" (Tee Grizzley)	Terry Wallace Jr.; Thomas Horton; Devin Wood; Brandon Quintana; Marko Andrej	TnTXD; Djaxx; Quintana; Andyr	2:28
18.	"TF?" (Don Toliver)	Toliver; Derek Anderson; Primo Pepper; Jacob Williams; Edgard Herrera; Parker	206derek; Primo; Cxsket	2:42
19.	"Don't Chart" (Cardi B)	Belcalis Almánzar; Jordan Thorpe; Anderson Hernandez; Timothy Z. Mosley; Andre Betts	Vinylz	2:44
20.	"GMA" (JT)	Jatavia Johnson; Benjamin Wilson; Dane Mcquillan; Burke Batelle	Ben10k; Danes Blood	2:16
21.	"Power Trip" (Jennie)	Jennie Kim; Alexander Guy Cook; Badriia Bourelly; Corey Lindsay-Keay	A. G. Cook	3:16
22.	"Blood in Your Eyes" (Tove Lo)	Tove Nilsson; Ilya Salmanzadeh; Ludvig Söderberg	Ilya; A Strut	2:41
23.	"Fast Emotion" (Zara Larsson)	Zara Larsson; Amy Allen; Elvira Anderfjärd; Luka Kloser	Anderfjärd; Kloser	2:55
24.	"Sweet Like Candy" (Camila Cabello)	Camila Cabello; Pablo Diaz-Reixa; Tobias Jesso Jr.	El Guincho	3:04
25.	"Only One" (Fcukers)	Shanny Wise; Jackson Lewis; Kenneth Blume; Lily Kaplan; Dylan Brady	Blume; Brady	2:25
26.	"Sandunguea" (Arca)	Alejandra Rodríguez	Arca	2:42
27.	"TRDWFE" (Rina Sawayama)	Rina Sawayama; Kevin Hickey; Sarah Hudson	Zhone	2:36
28.	"All Again" (Rose Gray)	Rosie Hudson-Edmonds; Patricio Alvarez; Maria Hazell		3:59
29.	"Crazy for You" (Lana Del Rey)	Elizabeth Grant; Rick Nowels	Nowels	3:43
30.	"Largate" (Kali Uchis and Helado Negro)	Karly Loaiza; Roberto Lange; Ismael Cancel	Helado Negro; Cancel	3:20
31.	"No Me Busques" (Omar Apollo)	Omari Velasco; Oscar Santander; Eddie Burns; Isaac Burns; Winston Riley	Santander	2:11
32.	"Bright Lights, Big City" (Keith Richards)	Jimmy Reed	Steve Jordan	3:30
33.	"Stone Kold Krazy Luuv" (Jesse Johnson and Dâm-Funk)	Jesse Johnson; Damon Riddick	Dâm-Funk	3:09
34.	"Overtown Lights" (Stanley Clarke, Yussef Dayes and Robert Glasper)	Stanley Clarke; Yussef Dayes; Robert Glasper	Glasper	3:01
Total length:				97:36

Notes

- "Ahh Yea", "Rhyno", "Count Up", "Wakin Up Flex" and "No Me Busques" are stylized in all caps

== See also ==
- Music of Grand Theft Auto V – Music of 2013 video game
