= Crydamoure =

French record label

- Founded: 1997
- Founder: Guy-Manuel de Homem-Christo; Eric Chedeville
- Defunct: 2003
- Status: Inactive
- Distributor: Topplers (France)
- Genre: French house; nu-disco
- Country of origin: France
- Location: Puteaux

Crydamoure (a variation of the French phrase cri d'amour or "cry of love" in English) was a French house record label owned by Guy-Manuel de Homem-Christo, better known as one-half of the former electronic music duo Daft Punk, and Eric Chedeville, also known as Rico the Wizard, who is the founder of the hard house label Pumpking Records.

== Background ==
The label was founded in 1997, with their first single "Holiday on Ice / Santa Claus" being the first release by Homem-Christo and his label co-owner Eric Chedeville (under the guise of Le Knight Club). Crydamoure was one of the first French house labels to incorporate band and guitar influences into its production. The label was left defunct in 2003, and shut down.

In 2015, Crydamoure was revived after Le Knight Club released a single named "The Fight", made for the Algerian film Gates of the Sun. Le Knight Club's involvement in the revival of the label is unknown.

== Legacy ==
The launch of Crydamoure was a chance for Homem-Christo to embark in a different sonority from Daft Punk and also a chance to bring budding new producers such as Romain Séo (Raw Man) and Paul de Homem-Christo (Play Paul; brother of Guy-Manuel) into the limelight. In regards to Crydamoure, Homem-Christo stated:

Myself and Thomas have the same tastes in music. When I make records for Crydamoure it's a different style than what may end up as Daft Punk music. I know what Thomas likes, and he knows what I like. Crydamoure is not so production oriented, even if it's not too far from Daft Punk. The Daft Punk material is more orchestrated and slightly different. I may be working on a sample for Crydamoure, and maybe no one else can hear the difference, but we know. It's very precise.

== Discography ==
=== Compilation albums ===
- CRYDA CD001 Waves - 2001
- CRYDA CD002 Waves II - 2003

=== Singles ===
- CRYDA 001: Le Knight Club - Santa Claus / Holiday On Ice (12") - 1997
- CRYDA 002: Paul Johnson - White Winds / Santa Claus (Remix) (12") - 1998
- CRYDA 003: Le Knight Club - Troobadoor / Mirage (12") - 1998
- CRYDA 004: Le Knight Club vs. DJ Sneak - Intergalactik Disko / Intergalactik Disko (DJ Sneak Version) (12") - 1998
- CRYDA 005: Le Knight Club - Boogie Shell / Coco Girlz / Mosquito / Coral Twist (12") - 1999
- CRYDA 006: The Buffalo Bunch - Take It To The Street (T.I.T.T.S.) / Music Box (12") - 1999
- CRYDA 007: Le Knight Club - Hysteria / Hysteria II (12") - 1999
- CRYDA 008: Raw Man - Lovers / Number Seven / Number Seven (Le Knight Club Remix) (12") - 1999
- CRYDA 009: Deelat - United Tastes Of Deelat (Wet Indiez / G.M.F. / Wetness Anthem) (12") - 1999
- CRYDA 010: Play Paul - Spaced Out / Holy Ghostz (12") - 2000
- CRYDA 011: The Eternals - Wrath Of Zeus (Original Mix) / (Light Mix) / (Dub Mix) / (Zeusappella) (12") - 2000
- CRYDA 012: Sedat - The Turkish Avenger / Feel Inside (12") - 2000
- CRYDA 013: Le Knight Club - Gator / Chérie D'Amoure (12") - 2001
- CRYDA 014: Archigram - Mad Joe / In Flight (Raw Club Mix) / In Flight (12") - 2001
- CRYDA 015: Le Knight Club - Soul Bells / Palm Beat / Tropicall (12") - 2002
- CRYDA 016: Le Knight Club - Nymphae Song / Rhumba (12") - 2002
- CRYDA 017: Archigram - Carnaval / Carnaval (Bring Back The Rave! Mix) (12") - 2002
- CRYDA 018: Crydajam - "If You Give Me The Love I Want" by Rico & Ouk feat. James Perry & Jane / "Playground" by Rico, Mederic Nebinger & Guyman / "Loaded" by Play Paul & Rico (12") - 2002
- CRYDA 019: Archigram - Doggystyle (12", S/Sided) - 2003

==== Unreleased ====
- Le Knight Club vs. DJ Sneak - Think Love, Not Hate
- Le Knight Club - Sequence Emotion

== See also ==
- Roulé
- List of record labels
