= Francisco Manuel Homem Cristo =

Portuguese military officer (1860–1943)

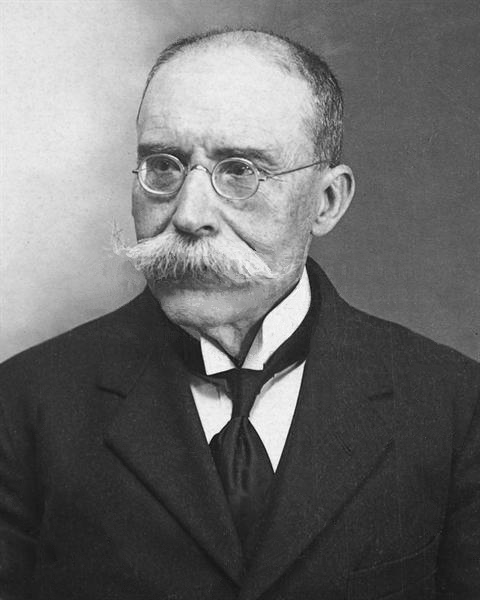
- Born: 8 March 1860; Aveiro
- Died: 25 February 1943 (aged 82); Aveiro
- Occupations: Politician, officer, professor

Francisco Manuel Homem Cristo (8 March 1860 – 25 February 1943) was a Portuguese military and political republican. He was distinguished as one of the officers of the Portuguese Army involved in the events surrounding the Anglo-Portuguese Treaty of 1891.

Accused of having betrayed the republican ideals in 1910, he found himself forced into exile in France.

He was the great-great-grandfather of Guy-Manuel de Homem-Christo, one half of the former electronic music duo Daft Punk, and of the Portuguese politician Alexandre Homem Cristo.

== Publications ==
- The events of January 31 and my imprisonment
- Pro-Patria
- Political banditry
- Letters from afar: I - Secondary education in Portugal and France
- Letters from afar: II - In defense of the instruction of the people
- Monarchists and Republicans
- Bolshevism in Russia
- Notes of my life and my time (7 volumes)
