= Le Knight Club =

French electronic music group (1997–2015)

- Origin: France
- Genres: French house; electronic; dance
- Years active: 1997–2015
- Label: Crydamoure
- Past members: Guy-Manuel de Homem-Christo; Éric Chédeville

Le Knight Club was a French electronic music duo formed in 1997 by Guy-Manuel de Homem-Christo, a member of the now-former French electronic duo Daft Punk, and Éric Chédeville, also known as Rico the Wizard, from Pumpking Records.

== Career ==
Guy-Manuel de Homem-Christo and Éric Chédeville were the founders of the record label Crydamoure, on which they released their albums Waves and Waves II, in 2000 and 2003, respectively, which include songs from various artists including Homem-Christo and Chédeville as a duo, credited as Le Knight Club.

The group then went on hiatus until 2015, when they briefly reunited to contribute to the soundtrack of the 2015 Algerian film Les Portes du soleil - Algérie pour toujours (English: Gates of the Sun - Algeria Forever), with a single named "The Fight". French music journalist Olivier Pernot's 2017 book French Touch 100: From Daft Punk to Rone lists the group among the French Touch groups in the tradition of Daft Punk.

== Discography ==
=== Albums ===
- Waves (2000)
- Waves II (2003)

=== Singles ===
- 1997: Santa Claus / Holiday on Ice (12")
- 1998: Troobadoor / Mirage (12")
- 1998: Intergalactik Disko / Intergalactik Disko (DJ Sneak Version) (12")
- 1999: Boogie Shell / Coco Girlz / Mosquito / Coral Twist (12")
- 1999: Hysteria / Hysteria II (12")
- 2001: Gator / Chérie d'Amoure (12")
- 2002: Soul Bells / Palm Beat / Tropicall (12")
- 2002: Nymphae Song / Rhumba (12")
- 2015: The Fight

==== Unreleased ====
- Think Love, Not Hate (with DJ Sneak)
- Sequence Emotion
