= Ca7riel & Paco Amoroso =

Argentinian musical duo

- Ca7riel & Paco Amoroso performing in 2025

Background information
- Origin: Buenos Aires, Argentina
- Genres: Latin alternative; Latin trap; EDM; hip house; Latin pop
- Years active: 2018–present
- Label: 5020
- Members: Ca7riel; Paco Amoroso
- Website: www.ca7rielypacoamoroso.com

Ca7riel & Paco Amoroso are an Argentine experimental trap, hip-hop, electronic dance music, and pop duo formed in Buenos Aires, consisting of Catriel Guerreiro and Ulises Guerriero, who are known individually as Ca7riel and Paco Amoroso, respectively.

Ca7riel & Paco Amoroso are known for their distinctive and eccentric style in both their music and lyrics. Their live performances often feature live instruments and a mix of genres, including Latin pop, fusion jazz, house rock, and various types of electronic music like electronic dance music. They have been awarded with a Grammy Award and eight Latin Grammy Awards.

== History ==
Catriel Guerreiro and Ulises Guerriero are both originally from Buenos Aires, Argentina. Catriel Guerreiro studied at the Juan Pedro Esnaola School of Music. Ulises Guerriero studied violin beginning at age six. The two artists met when they were just 6 years old, and first began collaborating musically in 2010.

As their sound began to evolve, they blended experimental and alternative sounds with Latin trap, and they are considered part of the first wave of urban music that emerged in Argentina. Both artists have individually recorded music sessions with the renowned Argentine producer Bizarrap, and both have collaborated with many other artists of their generation, such as Lali, Tini, and Duki, among others. In October 2024, the duo performed at the Tiny Desk Concerts, which went viral and helped them gain global recognition.

The runaway success of their Tiny Desk Concert formed the thematic material of their subsequent EP, Papota, which was released in March 2025 along with an accompanying short film featuring all four of the new songs on the EP. All of the recordings from Tiny Desk are also included. At the 26th Annual Latin Grammys later in the year, the duo was nominated for 10 awards, including Record of the Year, Album of the Year, and Song of the Year. They left with 5 award wins, for Best Pop Song, Best Alternative Music Album, Best Alternative Song, Best Short Form Music Video, and Best Long Form Music Video. Additionally, their producers, Rafa Arcaute and Federico Vindver, were awarded Producer of the Year for their work on Papota's four new songs.

In support of Papota, the duo embarked on an ambitious 60-date world tour, with stops in not only Latin America, but also Europe, Asia, and North America. They also performed on The Tonight Show with Jimmy Fallon, becoming only the second Argentine musical act to ever do so, and appeared at the popular and prestigious annual music festival Coachella. Additionally, in 2025, they were announced as the opening act for the five Latin American concerts in American rapper Kendrick Lamar's Grand National Tour.

Ca7riel & Paco Amoroso played at the Baloise Session in 2025.

In 2025, Ca7riel & Paco Amoroso announced a new LP, titled Top of the Hills. However, only a few weeks later in late December 2025, they shared on social media that they had made the decision to postpone their new album due to exhaustion from constant touring. The album will now be released sometime in early 2026.

In February 2026, a video appeared in their social media profiles featuring Sting, where he talks about how he took them under his wing and how Top of the Hills was cancelled because they suffered a "swift and sudden breakdown." This video is a presentation for their new studio album, Free Spirits, named after Sting's fictional wellness center in the video. With the release of this video, the release date of the album was revealed, and it will be released on March 19, 2026. Six days later, a collaborative song between Ca7riel y Paco Amoroso and Sting was released, named HASTA JESÚS TUVO UN MAL DÍA.

== Influences ==
When asked what albums have influenced their work, Ca7riel named Pantera's Vulgar Display of Power, while Paco Amoroso referenced Kendrick Lamar's To Pimp a Butterfly and Megadeth's Rust in Peace.

== Discography ==
=== Albums ===
==== Studio albums ====
List of studio albums with selected details
Title	Studio album details
Baño María	Released: 18 April 2024; Label: 5020 Records; Formats: Digital download, streaming
Free Spirits	Released: 19 March 2026; Label: 5020 Records; Formats: LP, digital download, streaming

==== Live albums ====
List of live albums with selected details
Title	Live album details
Baño María (En Vivo – Buenos Aires)	Released: 12 December 2024; Label: 5020 Records; Formats: Digital download, streaming

=== EPs ===
List of EPs with selected details
Title	Extended play details	Peaks
Title	Extended play details	JPN Sales
Papota	Released: 6 March 2025; Label: 5020 Records; Formats: CD, LP, digital download, streaming	69

=== Singles ===
List of singles as lead artists showing selected chart positions
Title	Year	Peak chart positions						Certifications	Album
Title	Year	ARG	IRE	JPN	NZ Hot	UK Dance	US Dance	Certifications	Album
"Piola"	2018	—	—	—	—	—	—		Non-album singles
"A Mí No"	2018	—	—	—	—	—	—		Non-album singles
"Jala Lala"	2018	—	—	—	—	—	—		Non-album singles
"Ouke"	2019	—	—	—	—	—	—		Non-album singles
"Ola Mina Xd"	2019	—	—	—	—	—	—		Non-album singles
"Mi Sombra"	2019	—	—	—	—	—	—		Non-album singles
"Cono Hielo"	2019	—	—	—	—	—	—		Non-album singles
"Paga Dios"	2022	—	—	—	—	—	—		Non-album singles
"En El After"	2022	—	—	—	—	—	—		Non-album singles
"Para Afuera"	2022	—	—	—	—	—	—		Non-album singles
"La Que Puede, Puede"	2024	—	—	—	—	—	—		Baño María
"Dumbai"	2024	68	—	92	—	—	—	AMPROFON: Gold	Baño María
"Agua" (with Tini)	2024	96	—	—	—	—	—		Baño María
"El Único"	2024	—	—	—	—	—	—		Baño María
"#Tetas"	2025	42	—	—	—	—	—		Papota
"El Día del Amigo"	2025	59	—	—	—	—	—		Papota
"Re Forro"	2025	—	—	—	—	—	—		Papota
"Beto's Horns" (with Fred Again)	2025	—	85	—	7	24	15		USB
"No Me Sirve Más" (Note: "No Me Sirve Más" was originally titled "Gimme More".)	2025	— (Note: "No Me Sirve Más" did not enter the Billboard Argentina Hot 100, but peaked at number 20 on the Argentina Pop Rhythmic airplay chart.)	—	—	—	—	—		Free Spirits
"Hasta Jesús Tuvo un Mal Día" (with Sting)	2026	— (Note: "Hasta Jesús Tuvo un Mal Día" did not enter the Billboard Argentina Hot 100, but peaked at number 13 on the Argentina Pop Rhythmic airplay chart.)	—	—	—	—	—		Free Spirits
"Goo Goo Ga Ga" (with Jack Black)	2026	—	—	—	—	—	—		Free Spirits
"Sexy Magic" (with PinkPantheress, Fred Again, and Étienne de Crécy)	2026	—	—	—	—	—	—		Grand Theft Auto VI: The Album
"—" denotes a recording that did not chart or was not released in that territory.

=== Guest appearances ===
List of guest appearances showing year released and album name
Title	Year	Other artist(s)	Album
"Todo Roto"	2024	Nathy Peluso	Grasa
"Todo Roto" (CRRDR remix)	2024	Nathy Peluso	Club Grasa

== Awards and nominations ==
Award organization	Year	Work	Category	Result	Ref.
Grammy Awards	2026	Papota	Best Latin Rock or Alternative Album	Won	
Grammy Awards	2027	Free Spirits	Best Latin Rock or Alternative Album	Pending	
Grammy Awards	2027	"Hasta Jesús Tuvo un Mal Día"	Best Latin Song	Pending	
Latin Grammy Awards	2025	Papota	Album of the Year	Nominated	
Latin Grammy Awards	2025	Papota	Best Alternative Music Album	Won	
Latin Grammy Awards	2025	"El Día del Amigo"	Best Pop Song	Won	
Latin Grammy Awards	2025	"El Día del Amigo"	Song of the Year	Nominated	
Latin Grammy Awards	2025	"El Día del Amigo"	Record of the Year	Nominated	
Latin Grammy Awards	2025	"#Tetas"	Record of the Year	Nominated	
Latin Grammy Awards	2025	"#Tetas"	Song of the Year	Nominated	
Latin Grammy Awards	2025	"#Tetas"	Best Alternative Song	Won	
Latin Grammy Awards	2025	"#Tetas"	Best Short Form Music Video	Won	
Latin Grammy Awards	2025	Papota (Short Film)	Best Long Form Music Video	Won	
Latin Grammy Awards	2026	Free Spirits	Album of the Year	Nominated	
Latin Grammy Awards	2026	Free Spirits	Best Alternative Music Album	Nominated	
Latin Grammy Awards	2026	"Ha Ha"	Record of the Year	Nominated	
Latin Grammy Awards	2026	"Hasta Jesús Tuvo un Mal Día"	Song of the Year	Nominated	
Latin Grammy Awards	2026	"Hasta Jesús Tuvo un Mal Día"	Best Pop/Rock Song	Won	
Latin Grammy Awards	2026	"Beto’s Horns" (Fred Remix) (with Fred Again)	Best Electronic Music Performance	Won	
Latin Grammy Awards	2026	Free Spirits (The Film)	Best Long Form Music Video	Won	
