= Hyperion (Gesaffelstein album) =

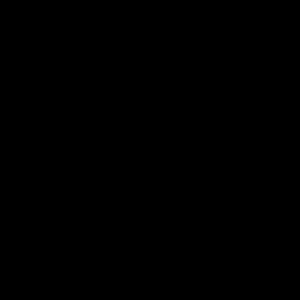

Studio album by Gesaffelstein
- Released: 8 March 2019
- Length: 40:16
- Label: Columbia
- Producers: Gesaffelstein; DaHeala; The Hacker; The Weeknd

Gesaffelstein chronology
Aleph (2013)	Hyperion (2019)	Novo Sonic System (2019)

Singles from Hyperion
- 1. "Reset" Released: 29 November 2018; 2. "Lost in the Fire" Released: 11 January 2019; 3. "Blast Off" Released: 1 March 2019

Hyperion is the second studio album by French DJ and record producer Gesaffelstein, released on 8 March 2019. The album includes the singles "Reset", "Lost In The Fire" with The Weeknd, and "Blast Off" with Pharrell Williams.

== Background ==
Gesaffelstein signed to Columbia Records in October 2018, and the following month, it was announced in a short press release that he would release new music "soon".

== Promotion ==
Gesaffelstein promoted the album with "mysterious" billboards and social media posts throughout November, with the album's cover art and title being shared on a billboard in Miami in December 2018. The website Dancing Astronaut stated that it was not clear from the billboard whether the entire billboard itself or the included picture of a "shattering black pane" was the cover art. The album's release was preceded by the release of three singles, "Reset", "Lost in the Fire", and "Blast Off". The first being released on 29 November 2018, the second being released on 11 January 2019, and the third being released on 1 March 2019.

== Critical reception ==
Professional ratings
Aggregate scores
Source	Rating
Metacritic	48/100
Review scores
Source	Rating
Highsnobiety	3/5
Knoxville News Sentinel	3.5/5 stars
NME	2/5 stars
Pitchfork	5.0/10
Release Magazine	7/10 stars
Resident Advisor	2.9/5
Spectrum Culture	2/5 stars
Sputnikmusic	3/5
The Sydney Morning Herald	2/5 stars
Under the Radar	4.5/10

Upon release, Hyperion received mixed reviews. In a positive review, Kat Bein from Billboard stated Hyperion as being good, complimenting the album cohesion and experimental tracklist.

The album's mixed reviews criticized the lack of definition in the artist's style and sound. Pitchfork's Larry Fitzmaurice called Lévy's production a "budget-level attempt to replicate ... other artists", ultimately calling Lévy an artist who has not defined himself, and stating, "that while he has consistency on his side, true artistic evolution remains out of Lévy's reach." NME's Luke Morgan Britton dismissed the LP as "uninspired and lacking in substance", mainly due to the record's lack of grip on a mood or sound. Even a supporter, Release Magazine journalist Peter Marchione, found the record's four "direct" vocal songs out of place with the "mature" instrumentals.

Critics were also generally less positive towards the tracks with featured artists. Britton argued they contributed to the "directionless feeling" and "largely see Lévy failing to truly engage with what his guests can bring to the table", made worse by the producer's own character being nonexistent. Marchione considered the instrumentals "well produced and at times more refined" than the vocal songs.

== Track listing ==
Track listing adapted from Pitchfork.

No.	Title	Writer(s)	Producer(s)	Length
1.	"Hyperion"	Mike Lévy	Gesaffelstein	2:53
2.	"Reset"	Lévy	Gesaffelstein	3:25
3.	"Lost in the Fire" (with the Weeknd)	Lévy; Abel Tesfaye; Jason Quenneville; Ahmad Balshe; Nate Donmoyer	Gesaffelstein; DaHeala; The Weeknd; Nate Donmoyer^{[a]}	3:22
4.	"Ever Now"	Lévy	Gesaffelstein; Donmoyer^{[a]}	1:38
5.	"Blast Off" (with Pharrell Williams)	Lévy; Pharrell Williams	Gesaffelstein	3:55
6.	"So Bad" (featuring Haim)	Lévy; Andrew Wyatt; Danielle Haim; Este Haim; Alana Haim	Gesaffelstein	3:36
7.	"Forever" (featuring The Hacker and Electric Youth)	Lévy; Michel Amato	Gesaffelstein; The Hacker; Austin Garrick^{[a]}	4:31
8.	"Vortex"	Lévy	Gesaffelstein	2:37
9.	"Memora"	Lévy	Gesaffelstein	3:37
10.	"Humanity Gone"	Lévy; Terrace Martin	Gesaffelstein	10:42
Total length:				40:16

Notes

- ^{^[a]} signifies a miscellaneous production credit

== Personnel ==
Musicians

- Mike Lévy – synthesizer (all tracks), programming (track 5)
- Terrace Martin – saxophone (2, 10)
- Nate Donmoyer – synthesizer (3–10), percussion (3), programming (5), whistles (8)
- Jason Quenneville – keyboards, programming (3)
- The Weeknd – vocals (3)
- Pharrell Williams – vocals (5)
- Haim – vocals (6)
- Michel Amato – synthesizer (7)
- Bronwyn Griffin – vocals (7)
- Cameron Avery – bass (9)

Technical

- Bob Ludwig – mastering
- Mike Lévy – mixing (1, 2, 4–10)
- Serban Ghenea – mixing (3)
- Michel Amato – mixing (7)
- Nate Donmoyer – engineering (1–), editing (3, 6–8)
- Derrick Stockwell – engineering (2, 4, 5), engineering assistance (1, 7–9)
- Chris Kasych – engineering (3, 5–10), engineering assistance (1, 2, 4)
- Shin Kamiyama – engineering (3)
- Chenao Wang – engineering assistance (3, 7)
- Collin Kadlec – engineering assistance (3, 7)
- John Hanes – engineering assistance (3)
- Mike Larson – engineering assistance (5)

== Charts ==
Weekly chart performance for Hyperion
Chart (2019)	Peak position
French Albums (SNEP)	92
Lithuanian Albums (AGATA)	13
US Top Dance Albums (Billboard)	10
