= Hurt You (The Weeknd song) =

Song by The Weeknd and Gesaffelstein

from the EP My Dear Melancholy
- Released: March 30, 2018
- Genre: Alternative R&B
- Length: 3:50
- Label: XO Records, Republic Records
- Songwriters: Abel Tesfaye; Mike Lévy; Guillaume Emmanuel de Homem-Christo; Henry Russell Walter
- Producers: Cirkut; Gesaffelstein; Guy Manuel de Homem-Christo

"Hurt You" is a song by Canadian singer-songwriter the Weeknd and French producer Gesaffelstein. Released as the fifth track from the Weeknd's debut extended play My Dear Melancholy (2018), it was written by the Weeknd (Abel Tesfaye), Gesaffelstein (Mike Lévy), Guy-Manuel de Homem-Christo of Daft Punk, and Cirkut, with the latter three producing the track.

== Critical reception ==
The song received mixed reviews from critics. Jordan Bassett of NME referred to the melody of the track as "sliding into in a squealing cacophony of electronic beats, howling synths and sound effects that evoke a ray gun blasting into your heart". While ranking every song on My Dear Melancholy, Michael Saponara of Billboard ranks the song at fourth place; "The second collaboration with Gesaffelstein is reminiscent of classic Abel," says Saponara, "'Hurt You' sees The Weeknd exude his wide-ranging singing abilities here more than any other track on the EP".

Craig Jenkins of Vulture described that the track, in particular the lyric "between your legs, not between your heart", as "feel[ing] like eavesdropping on a gross couples' squabble teetering between high drama and base chauvinism". Larry Fitzmaurice of Pitchfork stated that "Homem-Cristo and fellow Frenchman Gesaffelstein draw from the same well that produced Starboy's title track and 'I Feel It Coming,' but fail to match the radiance of either".

== Composition and lyrics ==
"Hurt You" is an alternative R&B song. In the song's lyrics, Tesfaye warns his partner to keep her distance, as he is, in reality, not fully in love with his partner.

== Charts ==
Chart performance for "Hurt You"
Chart (2018)	Peak position
Australia (ARIA)	37
Canada Hot 100 (Billboard)	17
Denmark (Tracklisten)	32
France (SNEP)	103
Germany (GfK)	85
Netherlands (Single Top 100)	63
Portugal (AFP)	28
Sweden (Sverigetopplistan)	33
UK Audio Streaming (Official Charts)	45
US Hot R&B/Hip-Hop Songs (Billboard)	23
US Billboard Hot 100	43

== Certifications ==
Certifications for "Hurt You"
Region	Certification	Certified units/sales
Australia (ARIA)	Platinum	70,000^{‡}
Brazil (Pro-Música Brasil)	Platinum	40,000^{‡}
Canada (Music Canada)	2× Platinum	160,000^{‡}
France (SNEP)	Gold	100,000^{‡}
New Zealand (RMNZ)	Gold	15,000^{‡}
United Kingdom (BPI)	Silver	200,000^{‡}
United States (RIAA)	Platinum	1,000,000^{‡}
^{‡} Sales+streaming figures based on certification alone.
