= Lost in the Fire =

2019 song by Gesaffelstein and the Weeknd

"Lost In The Fire"

Single by Gesaffelstein and The Weeknd

from the album Hyperion
- Released: 11 January 2019
- Length: 3:22
- Label: Columbia
- Songwriters: Mike Lévy; Abel Tesfaye; Jason Quenneville; Ahmad Balshe; Nate Donmoyer
- Producers: Gesaffelstein; The Weeknd; DaHeala

Gesaffelstein singles chronology
"Reset" (2018)	"Lost In The Fire" (2019)	"Blast Off" (2019)

The Weeknd singles chronology
"What You Want" (2018)	"Lost in the Fire" (2019)	"Price on My Head" / "Wake Up" (2019)

Music video
- "Lost in the Fire" on YouTube

"Lost In The Fire" is a song by French DJ and record producer Gesaffelstein and Canadian singer The Weeknd, released on 11 January 2019 as the second single from Gesaffelstein's second studio album, Hyperion (2019). Nate Donmoyer assisted the artists in writing and producing the song, with additional writing from Ahmad "Belly" Balshe and Jason "DaHeala" Quenneville.

== Background and release ==
A couple of months following his two previous featured collaborations with the Weeknd on the tracks "I Was Never There" and "Hurt You" from the artist's 2018 EP My Dear Melancholy, Gesaffelstein released the lead single "Reset" from his second studio album Hyperion. Following the release of the single in November 2018, both artists coincidentally began to independently tease fans about their upcoming projects, with The Weeknd sharing various shots of himself working in the studio through social media platforms and Gesaffelstein sharing images of possible artwork from Hyperion through billboards and his respective social media accounts. A week following New Year's of 2019, both Gesaffelstein and The Weeknd announced a collaborative single titled "Lost in the Fire", with both artist's posting more shots of the song's music video until the song's release on 11 January 2019.

== Lyrics and controversies ==
Charles Holmes of Rolling Stone described the song's lyrics as being that of "your straightforward Weeknd song, riding the line between epic love and neurotic lust as he tends to do." He also mentions how in the song Tesfaye is mourning the loss of a partner in one verse, while on the next he's promising to sexually satisfy his partner. It's speculated that one of the women the song refers to is model Bella Hadid. The lyrics "And I just want a baby with the right one/'Cause I could never be the one to hide one" are perceived by Holmes to be a diss at Drake regarding the controversial reveal of his son that occurred as a result of the rap feud between him and Pusha T. Other authors saw the possibility of the lyrics being a shot at the rapper as well.

The second verse of the song, with the lines "You said you might be into girls, said you're going through a phase / Keeping your heart safe / Well, baby, you can bring a friend / She can ride on top your face / While I fuck you straight", also caused controversy. The lines were called homophobic and misogynistic, and were accused by some of fetishizing bisexuality and perpetuating the falsehood that a person can be "turned straight", while others have instead speculated this is referring to her body being positioned straight during the sexual act, or even both.

== Critical reception ==
Despite its controversial lyrics, "Lost in the Fire" was met with positive reviews from critics. It was ranked as the 31st best dance song of the first half of 2019 by Billboard. On a statement discussing the single's position on the list, Kat Bein described the song as being a "steamy, slinky, foul-mouthed bedroom banger built on sci-fi synth work and midnight moods." She also compared the song's production to that of Daft Punk and complemented Gesaffelstein's new metallic look in the visuals for the song and its parent album.

== Music videos ==
After being teased by an 11-second teaser on 7 January 2019, two accompanying music videos were released alongside the single on 11 January 2019. The first of the two was a Spotify-exclusive vertical video, which was placed at the top of the streaming service's own 'Today's Top Hits' playlist following the song's release. The second of the two was the official music video for the single, which was released on Gesaffelstein's YouTube channel like the previously aforementioned teaser. It features the Weeknd performing various dance moves and poses through scenes accompanied by a dark background with Gesaffelstein standing idle alongside him. Critics noted the video as being dark and fashionable. It was directed by Manu Cossu. The song's vertical video was later uploaded to Gesaffelstein's YouTube channel on 11 February 2019.

== Charts ==
=== Weekly charts ===
Weekly chart performance for "Lost in the Fire"
Chart (2019–2022)	Peak position
Australia (ARIA)	24
Austria (Ö3 Austria Top 40)	54
Belgium (Ultratop 50 Flanders)	43
Belgium (Ultratop 50 Wallonia)	20
Canada Hot 100 (Billboard)	14
Canada CHR/Top 40 (Billboard)	9
Canada Hot AC (Billboard)	22
Czech Republic Airplay (ČNS IFPI)	48
Czech Republic Singles Digital (ČNS IFPI)	20
Denmark (Tracklisten)	17
Finland (Suomen virallinen lista)	8
France (SNEP)	78
Germany (GfK)	49
Global 200 (Billboard)	138
Greece International (IFPI)	4
Hungary (Stream Top 40)	15
Ireland (IRMA)	19
Latvia (LAIPA)	9
Lebanon (OLT20)	2
Lithuania (AGATA)	4
Mexico Airplay (Billboard)	39
Netherlands (Dutch Top 40)	35
Netherlands (Single Top 100)	60
New Zealand Hot Singles (RMNZ)	2
Norway (VG-lista)	20
Portugal (AFP)	43
Romania (Airplay 100)	18
Scottish Singles Sales (Official Charts)	35
Slovakia Airplay (ČNS IFPI)	54
Slovakia Singles Digital (ČNS IFPI)	9
Sweden (Sverigetopplistan)	9
Switzerland (Schweizer Hitparade)	29
UK Singles (Official Charts)	9
UK Hip Hop/R&B (Official Charts)	3
US Billboard Hot 100	27
US Adult Pop Airplay (Billboard)	31
US Dance Club Songs (Billboard)	6
US Hot Dance/Electronic Songs (Billboard)	3
US Hot R&B/Hip-Hop Songs (Billboard)	13
US Pop Airplay (Billboard)	13
US Rhythmic Airplay (Billboard)	11

=== Year-end charts ===
2019 year-end chart performance for "Lost in the Fire"
Chart (2019)	Position
Belgium (Ultratop Wallonia)	86
Romania (Airplay 100)	84
US Hot Dance/Electronic Songs (Billboard)	11
US Hot R&B/Hip-Hop Songs (Billboard)	99

2022 year-end chart performance for "Lost in the Fire"
Chart (2022)	Position
Lithuania (AGATA)	86

== Certifications ==
Certifications and sales for "Lost in the Fire"
Region	Certification	Certified units/sales
Australia (ARIA)	3× Platinum	210,000^{‡}
Canada (Music Canada)	4× Platinum	320,000^{‡}
Denmark (IFPI Danmark)	Platinum	90,000^{‡}
France (SNEP)	Diamond	333,333^{‡}
Germany (BVMI)	Gold	200,000^{‡}
Italy (FIMI)	Platinum	100,000^{‡}
Mexico (AMPROFON)	Platinum	60,000^{‡}
New Zealand (RMNZ)	2× Platinum	60,000^{‡}
Poland (ZPAV)	2× Platinum	100,000^{‡}
Portugal (AFP)	Gold	5,000^{‡}
Spain (Promusicae)	Gold	30,000^{‡}
United Kingdom (BPI)	Platinum	600,000^{‡}
United States (RIAA)	2× Platinum	2,000,000^{‡}
Streaming
Greece (IFPI Greece)	4× Platinum	8,000,000^{†}
Sweden (GLF)	Gold	4,000,000^{†}
^{‡} Sales+streaming figures based on certification alone.^{†} Streaming-only figures based on certification alone.

== Release history ==
Release dates for "Lost in the Fire"
Region	Date	Format	Label(s)	Ref.
United States	11 January 2019	Digital download; streaming	Columbia	
United States	14 January 2019	Hot adult contemporary	Columbia	
United States	15 January 2019	Contemporary hit radio	Columbia	
United States	22 January 2019	Dance radio	Columbia	
Italy	25 January 2019	Contemporary hit radio	Sony	

== See also ==
- Fetishization of LGBTQ people
