= Gamma (album) =

Studio album by Gesaffelstein
- Released: 29 March 2024
- Studio: Spookland (Paris); The Hit Factory (New York)
- Genre: Industrial techno; dark wave; synth pop; new wave; synthwave
- Length: 27:06
- Label: Columbia
- Producer: Gesaffelstein

Gesaffelstein chronology
Novo Sonic System (2019)	Gamma (2024)

Singles from Gamma
- 1. "Hard Dreams" Released: 1 March 2024

Professional ratings
Review scores
Source	Rating
Pitchfork	7.2/10

Gamma is the third studio album by French DJ Gesaffelstein, released on 29 March 2024 through Columbia Records. It was preceded by the single "Hard Dreams", a collaboration with Yan Wagner.

== Background and promotion ==
Skrillex tweeted in March 2023 that Gesaffelstein had just played him his new album. A trailer for the album was released upon its announcement in February 2024. The album was called a return to Gesaffelstein's "raw industrial sound" and a "surrealist approach to hard dance music".

== Track listing ==
All music is composed by Mike Lévy.

Gamma track listing
No.	Title	Lyrics	Length
1.	"Digital Slaves"	Yan Wagner	1:54
2.	"Hard Dreams"	Wagner	2:50
3.	"Your Share of the Night"	Wagner	3:09
4.	"Hysteria"		1:55
5.	"The Urge"	Wagner	2:24
6.	"Mania"		2:35
7.	"Lost Love"	Wagner	2:33
8.	"The Perfect"	Wagner	2:24
9.	"Psycho"		2:04
10.	"Tyranny"		2:38
11.	"Emet"		2:40
Total length:			27:06

== Personnel ==
Credits adapted from the album's liner notes.

- Mike Lévy – production, mixing, engineering
- Michael Harroch – engineering assistance
- Sébastian Roblin – engineering assistance
- Adam Ayan – mastering
- Yan Wagner – vocals (tracks 1–3, 5, 7, 8)
- Jordan Hemingway – photo
- Zone Studio – artwork
- Demna Gvasalia – suit
