= Aleph (album) =

Studio album by Gesaffelstein
- Released: 28 October 2013
- Recorded: 2011–2013
- Genre: Industrial techno; tech house; electronic; midtempo bass
- Length: 57:32; 66:07 (CD release)
- Label: Parlophone, Owsla (North America)
- Producer: Gesaffelstein

Gesaffelstein chronology
Bromance #4: Rise of Depravity (2012)	Aleph (2013)	Hyperion (2019)

Singles from Aleph
- 1. "Pursuit" Released: 17 June 2013; 2. "Hate or Glory" Released: 8 October 2013

Aleph is the debut album by French DJ Gesaffelstein, released on 28 October 2013 on Parlophone and through Owsla in North America. Gesaffelstein began recording it in 2011, and while still working on it, he gained popularity as one of the producers behind Kanye West's Yeezus (2013). Two singles were released to promote Aleph: "Pursuit" and "Hate or Glory". The album received positive reviews from music critics. "Hate or Glory" is also notable for being featured in the 2023 film John Wick: Chapter 4.

== Promotion and release ==
Before the release of Aleph, two singles were released to promote the album. The first one, "Pursuit", was released on 17 June 2013. Its music video was also released the same day. Spin named it one of the best music videos of 2013. The second single, "Hate or Glory", was released on 8 October 2013, along with a music video for it.

In September 2013 the album was made available for pre-order. The album packaging was also shown. Similar to Kanye West's Yeezus, physical releases feature no album cover; the album's gold disc is placed inside an empty CD jewel case covered by thin white lines, resembling a circuit board, with the Hebrew letter Aleph in white in the middle. Aleph was released on 28 October 2013 on Parlophone and through Owsla in North America.

== Critical reception ==
Professional ratings
Review scores
Source	Rating
Clash	8/10
Consequence of Sound	B
NME	8/10
Pitchfork	7.8/10

Aleph received positive reviews from critics. Writing for Pitchfork, Jamieson Cox praised the album and compared it to Kanye West's Yeezus in terms of its "thematic consistency and coherence", while citing the album's lack of concision as its main weakness. Derek Staples of Consequence of Sound noted the album's "steadfast focus on infusing dancefloor chaos with hushed melodies, soul-piercing vocals, and isolated, minimal basslines" and claimed that Gesaffelstein was "fortifying the roots of a very successful career". David Renshaw from NME magazine felt that much of the album had "a stainless-steel coldness to it" which he claimed "mostly works." In Los Angeles Times, August Brown called Aleph Gesaffelstein's breakthrough album and "a harsh reaction to the smoothed-out disco tones that have dominated radio and mainstream clubs of late". Reef Younis in his review for Clash magazine gave the album an 8/10 and wrote, "From the tom-tom thump of opener of 'Out Of Line' to the twisted electro of 'Trans', the beats hit with a thundering mechanical heft."

=== Accolades ===
Spin featured Aleph on their "20 Best Dance Albums of 2013" list, saying that Gesaffelstein "brings all the grinding menace of late-'80s Ministry [...] and creates a texturally naked battering of rusty noises and digital trash". Complex named it one of the best EDM albums of 2013, saying that the album "takes us back to the last electronica era, where major labels were shelling out for albums that pushed the boundaries" and that Gesaffelstein "maintains a vibe that's raw and aggressive, but isn't afraid of going downright murky". Billboard placed the album 14 on its list of 20 best dance music albums of 2013, stating that "Levy’s debut full-length implies an almost refreshing nihilism that rejects the sunshine and light of EDM in a sonic language it still understands".

== Track listing ==
All tracks are written by Mike Lévy

Aleph track listing
No.	Title	Length
1.	"Out of Line"	2:35
2.	"Pursuit"	4:07
3.	"Nameless"	4:39
4.	"Destinations"	3:36
5.	"Obsession"	4:09
6.	"Hellifornia"	3:40
7.	"Aleph"	4:46
8.	"Wall of Memories"	3:50
9.	"Duel"	3:59
10.	"Piece of Future"	5:09
11.	"Hate or Glory"	4:48
12.	"Values"	3:59
13.	"Trans"	4:33
14.	"Perfection"	3:34
Total length:		57:24

Notes

- On the CD version, "Perfection" plays during the first 3m31s of the 12m17s on track 14, followed by 5 minutes of silence and a hidden track "Premiere porte"

== Charts ==
Chart performance for Aleph
Chart (2013)	Peak position
Belgian Albums (Ultratop Flanders)	77
Belgian Albums (Ultratop Wallonia)	66
French Albums (SNEP)	30
Swiss Albums (Schweizer Hitparade)	95
US Top Dance Albums (Billboard)	16
US Heatseekers Albums (Billboard)	50
