= Rhyno (song) =

Single by Travis Scott

from the album Grand Theft Auto VI: The Album
- Released: September 17, 2026
- Genre: Hip-hop; experimental hip-hop
- Length: 3:00
- Label: Cactus Jack; Epic
- Songwriters: Jacques Webster II; Guy-Manuel de Homem-Christo
- Producer: Guy-Manuel de Homem-Christo

Travis Scott singles chronology
"Oh Chet" (2026)	"Rhyno" (2026)

"Rhyno" (stylized in all caps) is a song by American rapper Travis Scott, produced by French musician Guy-Manuel de Homem-Christo. The song was released on September 17, 2026, as one of the ten singles from the soundtrack to the video game Grand Theft Auto VI.

== Theme ==
Lyrically, Scott boasts his success and authenticity as a rapper, and hints at sex with women. He also references the Jack of Hearts strip club, which is set to feature in Grand Theft Auto VI.

== Reception ==
HotNewHipHop praised the beat, calling it "gnarly, in the best way possible". Ratings Game Music described the production as "mean as hell, edgy, and aggressive enough to make someone want to fight a phone booth and dropkick a mailbox", and lauded Scott's energetic performance, describing it as "unhinged but controlled, delivering the kind of intensity that should sound incredible while causing problems across Vice City."

== Charts ==
=== Weekly charts ===
Weekly chart performance
Chart (2026)	Peak position
Canada Hot 100 (Billboard)	61
Lithuania Airplay (TopHit)	39
New Zealand Hot Singles (RMNZ)	5
US Billboard Hot 100	84
US Hot R&B/Hip-Hop Songs (Billboard)	19

=== Monthly charts ===
Monthly chart performance
Chart (2026)	Peak position
Lithuania Airplay (TopHit)	61
