= Don't Chart =

2026 single by Cardi B

Single by Cardi B

from the album Grand Theft Auto VI: The Album
- Released: October 8, 2026
- Genre: Hip-hop
- Length: 2:44
- Label: Atlantic; Take-Two Interactive
- Songwriters: Belcalis Almanzar; Jordan Thorpe; Anderson Hernandez; Timothy Z. Mosley; Andre Betts
- Producers: Vinylz; Timbaland; Andre Betts

Cardi B singles chronology
"Ah Ha" (2026)	"Don't Chart" (2026)

"Don't Chart" is a song by American rapper Cardi B. It was released on October 8, 2026, and is one of ten singles released for Grand Theft Auto VI: The Album.

== Composition ==
Cardi B raps about her "opps" and disses them while also rapping about how she's "better". The track is promoted as a "playful track". The song's title and lyrics reference her successes on the Billboard Hot 100 chart, boasting that she can "name this song 'Don't Chart', it's gon' chart". Cardi B has had sixty-six placements and five number-one songs on the list throughout her career. Notably, however, the song failed to chart on the Hot 100 upon release, debuting at number two on its Bubbling Under extension chart instead.

== Festival ==
The song is scheduled to be featured at a Grand Theft Auto VI festival. Alongside Cardi B, the headliners include Travis Scott, Justice, and Don Toliver.

== Charts ==
Chart performance for "Don't Chart"
Chart (2026)	Peak position
Malta Airplay (Radiomonitor)	18
New Zealand Hot Singles (RMNZ)	27
US Bubbling Under Hot 100 (Billboard)	2
US Hot R&B/Hip-Hop Songs (Billboard)	24
US Rhythmic Airplay (Billboard)	10
