= Alexandre Homem Cristo =

Portuguese politician (born 1985)

Member of the Assembly of the Republic
- Incumbent
- Assumed office 26 March 2024
- Constituency: Lisbon

Personal details
- Born: 12 February 1985 (age 41)
- Party: Social Democratic Party

Manuel Alexandre Mateus Homem Cristo (born 12 February 1985) is a Portuguese politician serving as a member of the Assembly of the Republic since 2024. He has served as secretary of state of education since 2024.
