= Baloise Session =

Music festival in Basel, Switzerland

Baloise Session (previously known as the Rheinknie Session and AVO SESSION Basel) is an indoor music festival, which takes place every October/November in Basel, Switzerland. The festival features international as well as national artists of diverse music genres in an intimate club setting. In 2010 the festival celebrated its 25th jubilee, and in 2013 acquired sponsorship from a Swiss insurance company called Bâloise, changing the name of the event to Baloise Session. Beatrice Stirnimann has been associated with the Baloise Session for thirty years. In 2004, she became managing director. Today, she is CEO and owner. Over the past two decades, the festival's budget has doubled to approximately 8 million Swiss francs.

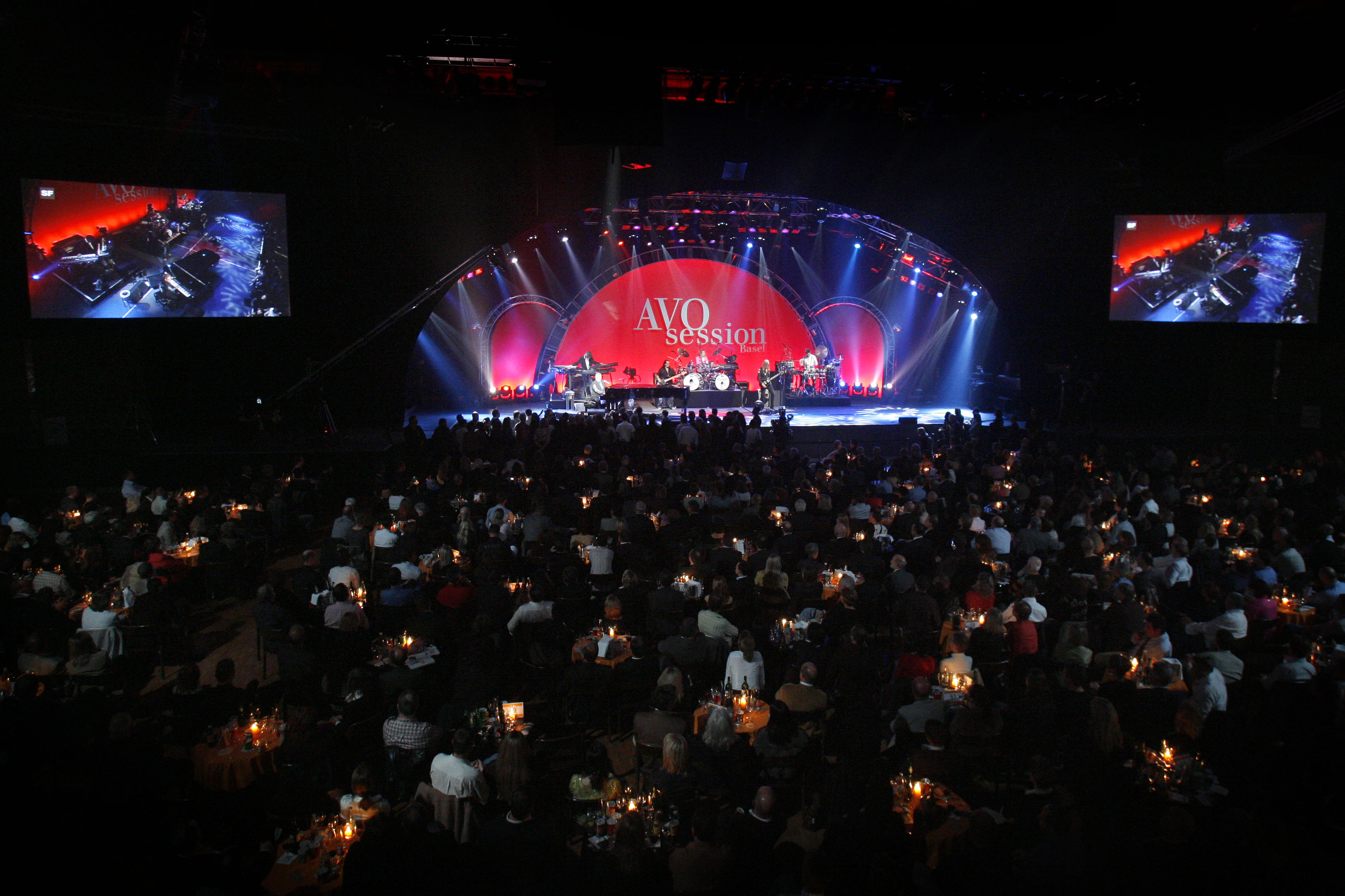
AVO SESSION Basel

== History ==
The festival was set up as the Rheinknie Session in 1985, with the five concerts of the first instalment of the festival in May 1986, including performances by Oscar Peterson, Albert Collins and Koko Taylor. The second year's edition included shows by Fats Domino and Buddy Guy.

=== Regional establishment ===
In 1988 Miles Davis agreed to perform at the festival. Subsequently, the festival was first acknowledged outside of north-western Switzerland. Names such as Dizzy Gillespie, Michel Petrucciani and Herbie Hancock followed and Claude Nobs from Montreux Jazz Festival joined as a member of the patrons committee.

In its first ten years the festival focussed on continuous growth. By gradually integrating musical styles such as world music, soul and funk after 1995, it proved possible to approach a younger audience.

=== National take-off ===
In 1997 the festival management decided to revamp the festival's content as well as its look and the festival's image was rejuvenated with greater importance attached to the attraction and driving power of international performers. The club style seating arrangement, the combination of acts and the opportunity to experience big names in an intimate atmosphere have become trademarks.

Embracing this vision, presenting sponsor AVO Cigars, part of Oettinger Davidoff, agreed to a growth-orientated sponsorship deal, with the festival becoming known as the AVO SESSION Basel.

In 2013, the festival acquired sponsorship from a Swiss insurance company called Bâloise, changing the name of the event to Baloise Session, with sponsorship in place for the ten-night event till at least 2025.

== Performances of note ==
The festival has presented headliner artists such as Buddy Guy (1987), Miles Davis, Michel Petrucciani (1988), Dizzy Gillespie, Nina Simone (1990), Herbie Hancock (1992), Fats Domino (1993), Michel Petrucciani (1997) Bob Geldof (1998); Ray Charles, Candy Dulfer (1999); James Brown (2000); Chris de Burgh, Candy Dulfer (2001); Paolo Conte, Candy Dulfer (2002); Deep Purple, Solomon Burke, Marcus Miller (2003); Lionel Richie, Lucio Dalla (2004); Simply Red, Francesco De Gregori, Candy Dulfer (2005); Elton John, Herbie Hancock, Pink (2006); Dolores O'Riordan, Patti Austin, Joe Cocker, Mark Knopfler, Katie Melua, Chuck Berry (2007); Jethro Tull, Zucchero, Amy Macdonald, Michael Bolton, Cyndi Lauper, Gary Moore (2008); Grace Jones, Tom Jones (2009).

Jamiroquai, Mary J. Blige, Sheryl Crow (2010); John Hiatt, Sonny Landreth, Liza Minnelli, Daniela Mercury, Paul Anka, Stephan Eicher, Laura Pausini (2011); Rod Stewart, Herbie Hancock, Alice Cooper, Katie Melua (2012); Birdy, Eric Clapton, Gloria Estefan, Randy Crawford (2013); Bryan Ferry, Amy Macdonald, Foreigner, James Blunt, Leona Lewis, Lisa Stansfield (2014); Toto, Candy Dulfer, Iggy Pop, Rebecca Ferguson, Sarah Connor (2015); Francesco De Gregori, Iggy Pop, Norah Jones, Marcus Miller, Alvaro Soler, John Newman, Marcus Miller (2016); Alicia Keys, Madness, Imelda May, Chris Rea, Manfred Mann's Earth Band, Nelly Furtado (2017); Tribalistas, Ms. Lauryn Hill, John Legend, Beth Hart, Candy Dulfer (2018), Dido, Michael Patrick Kelly, Snow Patrol, Rag’n’Bone Man (2019).

Nile Rodgers & CHIC performing at the Baloise Session, 20 October 2026.

Elisa, OneRepublic (2022). Jessie J, Norah Jones, Ellie Goulding, Passenger (2023), Take That, Seal, Sophie Ellis-Bextor, Natalie Imbruglia (2024). Duran Duran, Amy Macdonald, Jon Batiste, Aloe Blacc, Dermot Kennedy, Lukas Graham, Zoë Më (2025). Erykah Badu, Mark Forster, Lo & Leduc, Rick Astley, Nile Rodgers & Chic, Natasha Bedingfield, Calum Scott, Stephan Eicher, James Arthur, Joe Bonamassa (2026).

== International recognition ==
All concerts are recorded and broadcast in up to forty countries, with a potential audience of 150 million viewers, on stations such as SRF (on Swiss television and on their Radio SRF 1/Radio SRF 3 services), ARTE, Telebasel, TV24, TV25 and 3sat. Some concerts were worldwide streamed live from the Event Hall via ARTE Concert's website and YouTube channel.

In 2006 the festival's first Eurovision broadcast took place with a show of Elton John, followed by Katie Melua's Europe-wide live broadcast in 2007. Four performances, namely the concert featuring Solomon Burke (2003), Katie Melua (2007), Jethro Tull (2008) and Paul Anka (2011), were released in America and Europe on DVD. In 2022, Sky Arts started broadcasting performances from the concert to British Freeview viewers, with Kool & the Gang performance from 2017, Toto's Baloise Session from 2015 and Brian Wilson in 2016 being some of the concerts screened by the broadcaster.

== Awards ==
The Baloise Session has won the first prize in the cultural category of the International Sponsorships Awards presented by the German sponsorship association FASPO.
