= Gesaffelstein =

French musician, DJ, record producer and composer (born 1985)

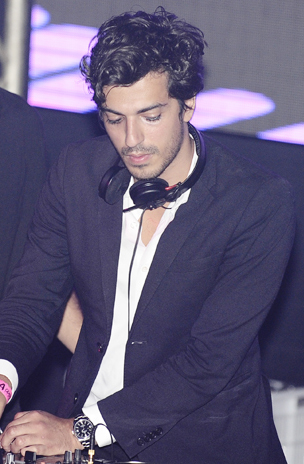
- Gesaffelstein at Amnesia, Ibiza in 2012

Background information
- Born: Mike Lévy; 24 June 1985 (age 41); Lyon, Rhône, France
- Genres: French electro; electro; alternative R&B; trap; hip hop; electro-industrial; synthwave
- Occupations: Disc jockey; record producer; songwriter; composer; music programmer
- Years active: 2008–present
- Labels: Parlophone; Columbia; OWSLA; Bromance; Zone; Turbo
- Website: gesaffelstein.com

Mike Lévy (French pronunciation: [majk levi]; born 24 June 1985), known professionally as Gesaffelstein, is a French DJ and record producer from Lyon. Dubbed the "Dark Prince of Techno", he has worked alongside artists such as the Weeknd, Lady Gaga, Daft Punk, Kanye West, A$AP Rocky, the Hacker, Lil Nas X, Charli XCX, Pharrell Williams and Justice.

He is best known for the single "Lost in the Fire" with the Weeknd. At the 68th Annual Grammy Awards, he won the Grammy Award for Best Remixed Recording, Non-Classical for his remix of Gaga's "Abracadabra".

== Stage name ==
Gesaffelstein is a portmanteau of Gesamtkunstwerk ("total artwork" in German, also the title of an album by the American electro group Dopplereffekt) and Albert Einstein.

== Career ==
Mike Lévy was born in Lyon, France, on 24 June 1985 to Jewish parents from North Africa. He started producing music at the age of sixteen when he first played an analog synthesizer. He released his first EP in 2008 through the label OD Records. In 2009, he founded the independent label Zone with the Hacker, Alex Reynaud and David Rimokh.

In July 2012, Gesaffelstein made the cover of DJ Mag with Brodinski. The same year, his track "Viol" was used by Citroën and Givenchy advertisements. He co-produced two tracks on Yeezus, the sixth album by American rapper Kanye West, including the lead single "Black Skinhead" and "Send It Up", both tracks produced with West, Daft Punk, Brodinski and Mike Dean.

On 28 October 2013, Gesaffelstein released his debut album Aleph under Parlophone Records and OWSLA (in North America only), which had been recorded since 2011. His remix of "Shockwave" by the Hacker is featured in the 2013 video game Grand Theft Auto V, on the Soulwax FM radio station.

He released the single "Conquistador" in 2015, collaborating with Jean-Michel Jarre, which is present on the album Electronica 1: The Time Machine. He also produced the soundtrack for the French-Belgian 2015 film Maryland, directed by Alice Winocour. In early 2018, he produced the tracks "I Was Never There" and "Hurt You" from the Weeknd's My Dear Melancholy, EP.

He signed to Columbia Records in November 2018, with whom he released the lead single "Reset" from his second studio album Hyperion in the same month. In January 2019, he released a collaboration with the Weeknd titled "Lost in the Fire" as the second single from Hyperion, and later in March 2019 released another collaboration with Pharrell Williams titled "Blast Off". Hyperion was released on 8 March 2019, to mixed reviews. On 3 October 2019, Gesaffelstein announced his surprise EP Novo Sonic System, consisting of 6 tracks, which was released the following day.

His track "Orck" was used as the pre-intro and outro theme music for Apple's October 2021 event. He announced a collaboration with fellow Kanye West collaborator KayCyy. TW20 50, an EP containing 3 collaborative songs between the two of them, released on 11 March 2022. KayCyy and Lévy's second collaborative EP, TW2052, was released on 26 May 2023. His third album, Gamma, was released on 29 March 2024.

Gesaffelstein co-produced and co-wrote on Lady Gaga's Grammy-winning album Mayhem in 2025, featuring on the sixth track, "Killah". His remix of the Mayhem track "Abracadabra" earned him the Grammy Award for Best Remixed Recording, Non-Classical at the 68th annual ceremony. His appearance at the ceremony attracted considerable attention, as he wore black gloves and his signature black reflective mask, reminiscent of the cover art for Gamma, and accepted the award without speaking.

== Musical style ==
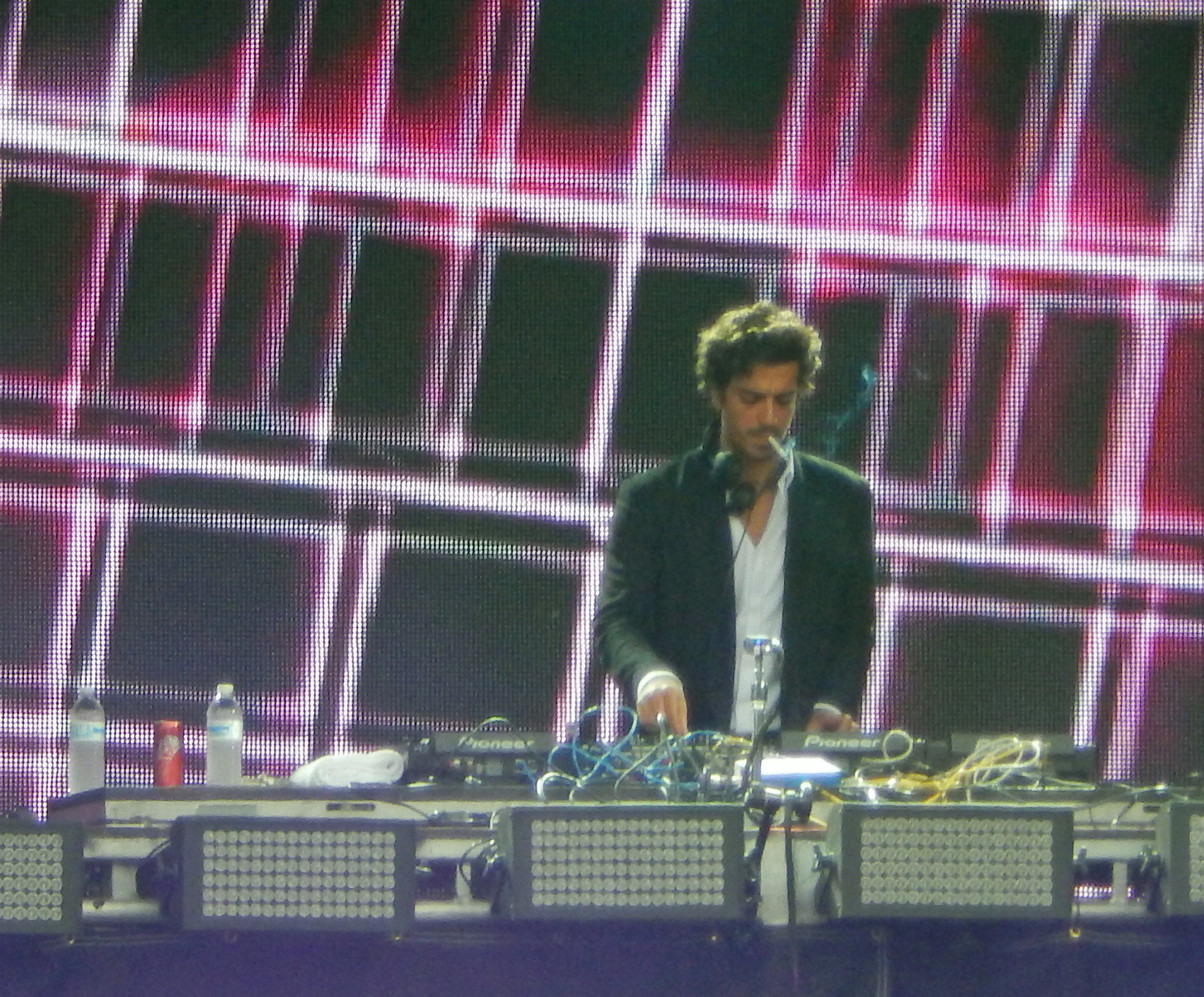
Gesaffelstein at Lollapalooza 2014

Mixmag describes Gesaffelstein's style as being a "dark and threatening techno, though enchanting"; The Inrocks see it as "black, ultra-violent music, [which] revives the techno fundamentals, the intransigence of Underground Resistance, the mental and obsessive structures of Drexciya, the contemporary power and more". Megan Buerger from the Washington Post describes his style as a mixture of dark and underground music, and notes that a specialty of the artist is his use of silences to create a "tension" before a "raucous explosion of bass and percussion".

== Influences ==
Gesaffelstein cites Dopplereffekt, Kraftwerk, and industrial dance formations from the '80s such as D.A.F. or Nitzer Ebb all as references. He has also said Joy Division and the Hacker influenced his work.

== Discography ==
=== Studio albums ===
- Aleph (2013)
- Hyperion (2019)
- Gamma (2024)

== Tours ==
- Aleph Tour (2012 - 2013)
- Requiem Tour (2019)
- Enter The Gamma Tour (2024 - 2025)

== Cinema ==
2014: Pursuit is used in the movie 3 Days to Kill

2023: Hate Or Glory is used in the movie John Wick: Chapter 4
