= Peaches discography =

List of Peaches' albums and singles

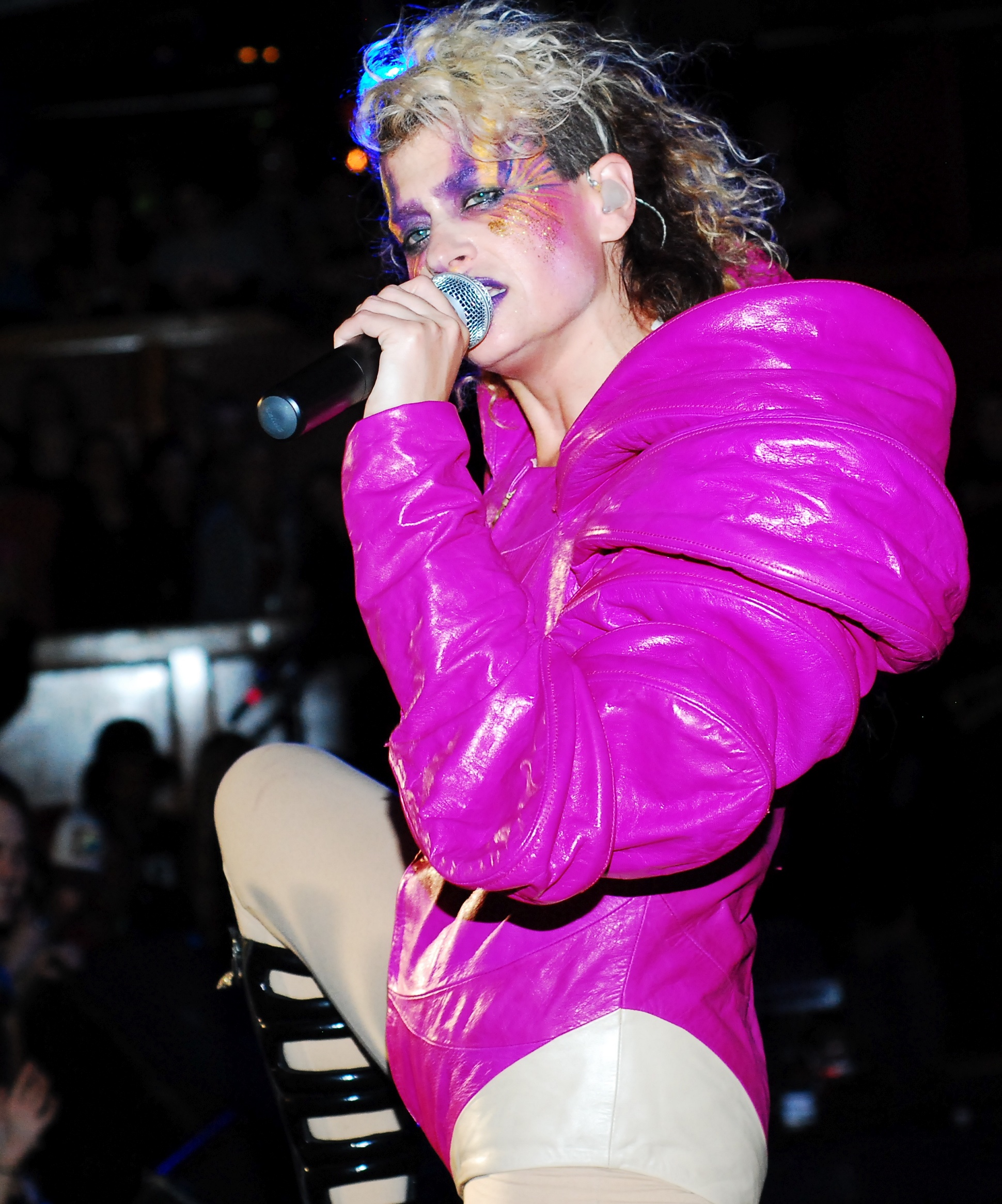
- Peaches performing in 2009
- Studio albums: 7
- Extended plays: 1
- Soundtrack albums: 1
- Remix albums: 1
- Singles: 31
- Music videos: 45
- Promotional singles: 4

Canadian singer Peaches has released seven studio albums, one remix album, one soundtrack album, one extended play, 30 singles (including 11 as a featured artist), four promotional singles, and 44 music videos. Before she gained fame as Peaches, Merrill Nisker released her debut studio album, Fancypants Hoodlum, under her own name in 1995. In 2000, Peaches released The Teaches of Peaches, her first album to break away from her avant-garde jazz and folk background.

Fatherfucker was released in 2003 and became Peaches' first charting album. It peaked at number five on the Dance/Electronic Albums chart, and reached numbers 35 and 33 on the Top Heatseekers and Independent Albums charts, respectively. In 2006, Peaches released Impeach My Bush, her first album to chart on the Billboard 200, peaking at number 168. Peaches' fifth album I Feel Cream was released in 2009 and charted in a total of six countries.

== Albums ==
=== Studio albums ===
List of studio albums, with selected chart positions
Title	Album details	Peak chart positions									
Title	Album details	AUS	BEL (FL)	FRA	GER	SWI	UK	UK Dance	US	US Dance	US Indie
Fancypants Hoodlum (as Merrill Nisker)	Released: 1995; Label: Accudub Inc.; Format: CD	—	—	—	—	—	—	—	—	—	—
The Teaches of Peaches	Released: September 5, 2000; Label: Kitty-Yo; Formats: CD, LP, digital download	—	—	—	—	—	—	—	—	—	—
Fatherfucker	Released: September 23, 2003; Label: XL; Formats: CD, LP, digital download	132	—	132	—	—	93	3	—	5	33
Impeach My Bush	Released: July 11, 2006; Label: XL; Formats: CD, LP, digital download	70	—	156	—	—	132	3	168	5	13
I Feel Cream	Released: May 1, 2009; Label: XL; Formats: CD, LP, digital download	65	73	184	75	75	152	—	160	5	23
Rub	Released: September 25, 2015; Label: I U She Music; Formats: CD, LP, digital download	—	110	—	—	—	187	—	—	4	38
No Lube So Rude	Released: February 20, 2026; Label: Kill Rock Stars; Formats: CD, LP, digital download	—	—	—	—	—	—	—	—	—	—
"—" denotes a recording that did not chart or was not released in that territory.

=== Remix albums ===
Title	Album details
Rub Remixed	Released: June 3, 2016; Label: I U She Music; Formats: LP, digital download

=== Soundtrack albums ===
Title	Album details
Big Mistakes (Soundtrack from the Netflix Series) (with Nora Kroll-Rosenbaum)	Released: April 9, 2026; Label: Netflix Music; Formats: Digital download

== Extended plays ==
Title	Extended play details
Casablanca Reworks (The Gomma All Stars featuring Peaches)	Released: January 27, 2012; Label: Gomma; Formats: 12", digital download

== Singles ==
=== As lead artist ===
List of singles as lead artist, with selected chart positions, showing year released and album name
Title	Year	Peak chart positions							Album
Title	Year	AUS	AUT	BEL (FL) Dance	FRA	UK	UK Dance	UK Indie	Album
"Lovertits"	2000	—	—	—	—	—	—	—	The Teaches of Peaches
"Set It Off"	2001	—	—	—	—	36	—	—	The Teaches of Peaches
"Rock Show"	2003	—	—	—	—	—	—	—	The Teaches of Peaches
"Operate"	2003	—	—	—	—	112	—	—	Fatherfucker
"Kick It" (featuring Iggy Pop)	2004	195	—	—	—	39	—	—	Fatherfucker
"Shake Yer Dix"	2004	—	—	27	—	97	1	—	Fatherfucker
"Downtown"	2006	—	—	—	—	50	5	8	Impeach My Bush
"Boys Wanna Be Her"	2006	—	—	—	—	—	—	—	Impeach My Bush
"Kiss Kiss Kiss" (with Ono)	2007	—	—	—	—	—	—	—	Yes, I'm a Witch
"Talk to Me"	2009	101	51	—	99	—	—	—	I Feel Cream
"Lose You"	2009	—	—	11	—	—	—	—	I Feel Cream
"I Feel Cream"	2009	—	—	—	—	—	—	—	I Feel Cream
"Jonny"	2010	—	—	—	—	—	—	—	Jonny EP
"Unzip Me" (with Cazwell)	2011	—	—	—	—	—	—	—	Hard 2 B Fresh
"Burst!"	2012	—	—	—	—	—	—	—	Non-album single
"Light in Places"	2015	—	—	—	—	—	—	—	Rub
"Bodyline" (featuring Nick Zinner)	2015	—	—	—	—	—	—	—	Non-album single
"Close Up" (featuring Kim Gordon)	2015	—	—	—	—	—	—	—	Rub
"Dick in the Air"	2015	—	—	—	—	—	—	—	Rub
"Flip This"	2020	—	—	—	—	—	—	—	Non-album singles
"Pussy Mask"	2021	—	—	—	—	—	—	—	Non-album singles
"Not in Your Mouth None of Your Business"	2025	—	—	—	—	—	—	—	No Lube So Rude
"Fuck Your Face"	2025	—	—	—	—	—	—	—	No Lube So Rude
"No Lube So Rude"	2026	—	—	—	—	—	—	—	No Lube So Rude
"Hanging Titis"	2026	—	—	—	—	—	—	—	
"Whatcha Gonna Do About It"	2026	—	—	—	—	—	—	—	
"—" denotes a recording that did not chart or was not released in that territory.

=== As featured artist ===
List of singles as featured artist, with selected chart positions, showing year released and album name
Title	Year	Peak chart positions		Album
Title	Year	CAN	UK	Album
"Red Leather" (with Gonzales)	2000	—	—	Non-album single
"Grab My Shaft" (Louie Austen featuring Peaches)	2003	—	117	Only Tonight
"We Don't Play Guitars" (Chicks on Speed featuring Peaches)	2003	—	77	99 Cents
"Motor Inn" (Iggy Pop with Feedom featuring Peaches)	2003	—	—	Skull Ring
"Do They Know It's Hallowe'en?" (as part of The North American Hallowe'en Prevention Initiative)	2005	4	—	Non-album singles
"9 of 10" (Removal featuring Peaches)	2005	—	—	Non-album singles
"Wild Thing" (Tone Lōc featuring Peaches)	2007	—	—	Non-album singles
"Map of Tasmania" (The Young Punx featuring Amanda Palmer and Peaches)	2011	—	—	Non-album singles
"Ludwig Amadeus Horzon" (Ludwig Amadeus Horzon featuring Peaches)	2012	—	—	Non-album singles
"Lesbians in the Forest" (Carole Pope featuring Peaches)	2013	—	—	Music For Lesbians
"Trouble" (Natalia Kills featuring Peaches)	2014	—	—	Trouble
"This Is Not a Pop Song" (with Regurgitator)	2024	—	—	Invader
"—" denotes a recording that did not chart or was not released in that territory.

=== Promotional singles ===
Title	Year	Album
"Fourth Sex Baby" (Playgroup featuring Peaches and Gonzales)	2001	Playgroup
"Walk the Night" (Note: "Walk the Night" was released as a limited-edition 12" vinyl single for Record Store Day 2012.) (with Phenomenal Handclap Band)	2012	Casablanca Reworks
"Get Down" (Emigrate featuring Peaches)	2014	Silent So Long
"Whistleblower" (Mumbai Science featuring Peaches)	2014	Dèjá Vu

== Guest appearances ==
List of non-single guest appearances, with other performing artists, showing year released and album name
Title	Year	Other artist(s)	Album
"Keine Melodien"	2000	None	"Keine Melodien" (single)
"Eat a Peach"	2001	Din-St	Communicating at an Unknown Rate
"Sexy Dancer"	2001	7 Hurtz, Bitch Lap Lap	If I Was Prince
"Heavy Shit"	2001	Mocky, Gonzales	In Mesopotamia
"The Joy of Thinking"	2002	Gonzales	Presidential Suite
"Boys and Girls"	2002	Taylor Savvy, Mignon	Ladies & Gentleman
"Everybody Party"	2002	Taylor Savvy	Ladies & Gentleman
"We Don’t Play Guitars"	2003	Chicks on Speed	99 Cents
"No Piss No Fun"	2003	Lost Treasures, Gonzales	Lost Treasures
"Rock Show"	2003	Iggy Pop	Skull Ring
"Oh My God"	2003	Pink	Try This
"Oo She She Wa Wa"	2004	Snax	From the Rocking Chair to the Stage
"Backass"	2006	Karen O	Jackass Number Two: Music from the Motion Picture
"Fine as Fuck"	2006	Electrosexual, Scream Club	I'm Going Crazy
"Hannelore"	2006	None	Desire Will Set You Free
"Bad Girl"	2007	Mignon	Bad Evil Wicked & Mean
"Helicopter" (Weird Science Remix)	2007	Bloc Party	Pillowface and His Airplane Chronicles
"The Dogma of Music"	2007	The Scandals	Cutouts, Patchworks & Ripoffs
"Search and Destroy"	2009	None	War Child Presents Heroes
"She's a Hellcat"	2009	The Legendary Tigerman	Femina
"Speak to Me/Breathe"	2009	The Flaming Lips, Stardeath and White Dwarfs, Henry Rollins	The Flaming Lips and Stardeath and White Dwarfs with Henry Rollins and Peaches Doing The Dark Side of the Moon
"The Great Gig in the Sky"	2009	The Flaming Lips, Henry Rollins	The Flaming Lips and Stardeath and White Dwarfs with Henry Rollins and Peaches Doing The Dark Side of the Moon
"My Girls"	2010	Christina Aguilera	Bionic
"Alligator_Aviator_Autopilot_Antimatter"	2011	R.E.M.	Collapse Into Now
"Turn It On"	2011	None	Covers
"Dead End Justice"	2011	Kathleen Hanna	Take It or Leave It – A Tribute to the Queens of Noise: The Runaways
"Maniac"	2012	Moullinex	Flora
"Scare Me"	2013	Major Lazer, Timberlee	Free the Universe
"What You Want"	2016	Jean-Michel Jarre	Electronica 2: The Heart of Noise
"Freezing Out"	2016	Mr. Oizo	All Wet
"Why D'Ya Do It?"	2023	Shirley Manson	The Faithful: A Tribute to Marianne Faithfull

== Remixes ==
Title	Year	Artist
"Get Me Off"	2002	Basement Jaxx
"TKO"	2004	Le Tigre
"Red Neck Sex"	2004	Gibby Haynes
"Broken Box"	2005	Queens of the Stone Age
"Peaches"	2005	Pink Grease
"Technologic"	2005	Daft Punk
"Cheated Hearts"	2006	Yeah Yeah Yeahs
"Fucking Boyfriend"	2006	The Bird and the Bee
"Stilettos"	2007	Crime Mob
"Marina Gasolina"	2007	Bonde do Rolê
"Funplex"	2008	The B-52s
"Paris Is Burning"	2008	Ladyhawke

== Other credits ==
Title	Year	Artist	Album	Role(s)
"The Worst MC"	2000	Gonzales	Gonzales Über Alles	Additional vocals
"Futuristic Ain't Shit to Me"	2000	Gonzales	The Entertainist	Production
"Prankster Fly"	2000	Gonzales	The Entertainist	Production
"You Belong in the Show"	2000	The World Provider	The Elements of Style	Mixing
"The Oligarchy"	2000	The World Provider	The Elements of Style	Mixing
"Let's Go Again"	2001	Télépopmusik	Genetic World	Vocals
"Dance Among the Ruins"	2007	Tommie Sunshine	Ultra.Rock Remixed	Vocals

== Music videos ==
List of music videos, showing year released and directors
Title	Year	Director(s)	Ref.
"Lovertits"	2000	Peaches	
"Diddle My Skittle"	2000	Peaches	
"Set It Off"	2000	Peaches	
"Red Leather" (with Gonzales)	2000	Unknown	
"Set It Off" (Radio Mix by Tobi Neumann)	2002	Daniel Lwowski and Frank Wilde	
"Rock Show"	2003	Nicolas Amato	
"I'm the Kinda"	2003	JD Samson (camerawoman)	
"Rock 'n' Roll"	2003	Peaches	
"Tombstone, Baby"	2003	Peaches and Maxx Ginnane	
"We Don't Play Guitars" (Chicks on Speed featuring Peaches)	2003	Deborah Schamoni	
"Kick It" (featuring Iggy Pop)	2003	Dawn Shadforth and Alex Smith	
"Downtown"	2006	Timothy Saccenti	
"Boys Wanna Be Her"	2006	Kris Lefcoe	
"Wild Thing" (Peaches Remix) (Tone Lōc featuring Peaches)	2007	Bucky Fukumoto	
"Get It"	2008	Peaches	
"Talk to Me"	2009	Price James	
"More"	2009	Frederic D	
"Lose You"	2009	Peaches	
"Serpentine"	2009	Price James	
"Take You On"	2009	Angie Reed	
"I Feel Cream"	2009	Kinga Burza	
"Trick or Treat"	2009	Bobby Good	
"Relax"	2010	Peaches	
"Mommy Complex"	2010	Antuong Nguyen	
"Billionaire"	2010	Ssion	
"Show Stopper"	2010	Caroline Sascha Cogez	
"Map of Tasmania" (The Young Punx featuring Amanda Palmer and Peaches)	2011	Michael Pope	
"Mud"	2011	Vice Cooler	
"Mud" (Video Deux)	2011	Jasmin Tarasin	
"Turn It On"	2011	Nice and Polite	
"Unzip Me" (with Cazwell)	2011	Bec Stupak	
"Maniac" (with Moullinex)	2012	Kope / Figgins	
"Our Love" (with Telonius)	2012	Bureau Mirko Borsche	
"Free Pussy Riot!"	2012	Unknown	
"Burst!"	2012	Vice Cooler	
"Light in Places"	2015	Peaches	
"Close Up" (featuring Kim Gordon)	2015	Vice Cooler	
"Dick in the Air"	2015	Peaches	
"I Mean Something" (featuring Feist)	2015	Silas Howard	
"Rub"	2015	Peaches, A.L. Steiner, and Lex Vaughn	
"Free Drink Ticket"	2016	Sara Sachs	
"Vaginoplasty" (featuring Simonne Jones)	2016	Briana Gonzales	
"Sick in the Head"	2016	Peaches	
"How You Like My Cut"	2016	Peaches	
"Pussy Mask"	2021	Leah Shore	
