= Lose You (Peaches song) =

Single by Peaches

from the album I Feel Cream
- Released: July 6–7, 2009
- Genre: Synth-pop, electropop, Italo disco
- Length: 3:32 (original); 4:55 (Brodinski & Yuksek Remix); 8:37 (Matt Walsh & Alex Jones Remix)
- Label: XL
- Songwriter(s): Peaches, Simian Mobile Disco
- Producer(s): Simian Mobile Disco

Peaches singles chronology
"Talk to Me" (2009)	"Lose You" (2009)	"I Feel Cream" (2009)

Music video
- "Lose You" on YouTube

"Lose You" is an Italo disco song written by Peaches and Simian Mobile Disco, and produced by Simian Mobile Disco. It is the second single from the album I Feel Cream. Alternatively, the DJ Hell Remix was released in Germany by International DeeJay Gigolo Records. The version "Lose You" (vs. Drums of Death) appeared on the iTunes and Japan bonus discs for I Feel Cream.

== Critical reception ==
"Lose You" received generally positive reviews from critics. Matthew Perpetua of Pitchfork Media wrote that the song "casts aside the baggage of the Peaches persona and is better for it, and the variation in vocal technique broadens the range of the record considerably." Gordon Bruce of The Skinny gave the song 4 out of 5 stars, describing the song as a "brooding electronic number" that proves Peaches' versatility. By contrast, Erin Lyndal Martin of PopMatters wrote a slightly more critical review, saying that "'Lose You' is a retro treat that wouldn’t sound out of place amidst 'Heart of Glass'-era Blondie, but its repetitiveness makes the three and a half minutes seem a bit longer than it is." In addition, Heather Phares of Allmusic wrote that "'Lose You,' an icy, fragile ballad, is pretty but doesn't quite work as a way to show Peaches' vulnerable side."

== Chart performance ==
"Lose You" became Peaches' first single to chart on the Belgian Dance Chart since "Shake Yer Dix" in 2004. "Lose You" debuted at number 23 on the Belgian Dance Chart but peaked at number 11. The song spent a total of 6 weeks on the chart.

== Music video ==
=== Development ===
The music video for "Lose You" was directed by Peaches herself.

=== Synopsis ===
In the video Peaches is seen wearing a bathrobe in her apartment. Two guests arrive at the door, one male and one female. She tells them that she has something important to say, so they should go somewhere more private. She takes them into a backroom and confesses that she's in love with both of them. Peaches dims the lights and proceeds to sing and dance for them under a disco ball as two male dancers come out and join her. At the end of the video, the lights suddenly go off and she orders them to leave.

=== Release and reception ===
The music video for "Lose You" premiered on XL's YouTube channel on June 3, 2009. It was featured on Perez Hilton's website on June 6. On June 8, it was featured on the Pickard of the Pops section of The Guardian by Anna Pickard.

Nick Neyland of Prefix Magazine said, "there's a seedy, voyeuristic feel to the clip", yet "the video perfectly complements the song."

== Track listing ==
1. "Lose You" – 3:32
2. "Lose You" (Brodinski & Yuksek Remix) – 4:55
3. "Lose You" (Matt Walsh & Alex Jones Remix) – 8:37

== Song usage ==
The DJ Hell Remix was included on the compilation album International DeeJay Gigolo CD Twelve by International DeeJay Gigolo Records.

== Charts ==
Chart (2009)	Peak position
Belgian Dance Chart	11
