= Playgroup (band) =

- Born: Trevor Jackson
- Origin: London, England
- Genres: Dance
- Years active: 2001–present
- Labels: Playgroup Records, Source UK
- Website: http://trevor-jackson.com/

Playgroup is a British dance act. It is the project of musician and designer Trevor Jackson.

They were associated with the electroclash movement. Jackson has also performed under the names Underdog and Skull.

== Discography ==
=== Albums ===
- Playgroup Party mix Vol. 1 (Playgroup Records, 2001)
- Playgroup (Source UK, 2001 and on Astralwerks in the USA on 19 March 2002. It was also re-released as a limited edition double album on Playgroup Records in June 2003)
- DJ-Kicks: Playgroup (Studio !K7, 2002)
- Reproduction (Peacefrog Records, 1 November 2004)

=== Remixes ===
- Chicks on Speed - "Wordy Rappinghood" (2003)
- Louie Austen feat. Peaches - "Grab My Shaft" (2003)

== "Number One" ==
In 2001, Playgroup released the single "Number One", an up-tempo disco dance song. The music video was computer-animated and featured a tower PC which was transformed into a humanoid dancing robot during the song. The dancing PC performed various dance moves with disco to breakdance elements in a digital dance arena, complete with lighting effects. Among the moves are some signature ones of famous artists. The list included Michael Jackson's moonwalk and the glowing tiles under each footstep first seen in his "Billie Jean" video. The rocking version of the duckwalk popularized by Angus Young of AC/DC was also recreated by the computer-generated dancer. "Number One" peaked at number 66 on the UK Singles Chart.

Playgroup also remixed the number one single "Carols" by Ayumi Hamasaki for her remix album, Ayu-mi-x 6: Silver.
