= I Feel Cream (song) =

Single by Peaches

from the album I Feel Cream
- Released: November 9, 2009
- Recorded: CD single
- Genre: Disco; house; techno
- Length: 4:31
- Label: XL
- Songwriter(s): Peaches, Simian Mobile Disco, Drums of Death
- Producer(s): Peaches, Drums of Death, Shapemod

Peaches singles chronology
| "Lose You" (2009) | "I Feel Cream" (2009) | "Jonny" (2010) |

"I Feel Cream" is a song by Canadian recording artist Peaches from her fifth studio album, I Feel Cream (2009). Written by Peaches, Simian Mobile Disco and Drums of Death, and produced by Peaches, Drums of Death and Shapemod, the house and disco track incorporates elements of techno. Its lyrics, which Peaches sings and raps, describe experiencing love at first sight in a club.

The song was released as the third single from her album of the same name. The track was favorably received by music critics, who praised its style and melody, as well as deeming it a highlight of the album. An accompanying music video, released via XL Recordings' YouTube account in October 2009, depicts Peaches performing in a variety of costumes.

== Composition ==
"I Feel Cream" is a house and disco track with techno influences. It drew comparison to the work of the Chemical Brothers and "Blinded by the Lights" by The Streets, and was also described as a "soothing rave". Critic Heather Phares, writing for AllMusic, likened the song's "breathy appeal" to her previous single "Downtown". Her delivery has been noted for being in an unusually high voice, and has been described as "cooing". The song has also been noted for its stylistic contrast with "Billionaire", the preceding track on its parent album; writing for PopMatters, Erin Lyndal Martin likened the transition between the two songs to that of "an heiress going from a sex video star to a delicate, puppy-toting celebutante", also noting the song's "sweetness" and opining that its style almost allows listeners to "imagine that the titular cream is simply a rich dairy product. Almost."

Lyrically, the song describes love at first sight at a club. The song's chorus opens with the line "I know the role that I could play", while in the rapped breakdown, she rhymes "guitar hero" with "DeNiro" and "Robert Shapiro". Its lyrics grow more explicit over the course of the song, while the beat gets progressively glitchier. Phares compared the lyrics to Andrea True Connection's "More, More, More" and Donna Summer's "I Feel Love".

== Critical reception ==
Ian Wade of BBC Music said that "I Feel Cream" "is a hands-in-the-air laser elation." In an album review for Rolling Stone, critic Caryn Ganz wrote that Peaches "plays the part of a... club goddess" on the song. Writing for Uncut, John Mulvey praised the melody as "lovely". A record review for New Musical Express, penned by Tim Chester, deemed the track one of the "most notable" songs on the album in terms of production. Phares, in her AllMusic review, deemed the track an album highlight.

== Music video ==
The music video for "I Feel Cream" was directed by Kinga Burza. In an interview with PromoNews, Burza explained the appeal of the video despite its low-budget:

We were particularly restricted on this one budget-wise [...] It's a video that really gained a lot from Peaches' ability to express herself in dramatic metallic shoulders, cut out leotards and thigh-high, lace up Louis Vuitton boots, taking you back to those early but exciting Bowie videos that were merely a wonderful performance of a red-headed David against a white wall wearing blue shadow. I knew if we were forced to go minimal, we were best to make a statement!

In the video Peaches wears a variety of outfits, both futuristic and retro. Her lips are painted gold and she sings and dances as a variety of colors, shapes, and special effects flash across the screen. It premiered on XL's YouTube channel on October 15, 2009. PromoNews described the music video as "hypnotically gorgeous, with experimental camerawork, projections, and vision-mixing."

== Track listing ==
1. "I Feel Cream" – 4:33
2. "I Feel Cream" (Cory Enemy Remix) – 6:45
3. "I Feel Cream" (Blogula Mix) - 7:13
4. "I Feel Cream" (Proxy Remix) - 4:30
