= Fat Truckers =

UK musical group

- Origin: Sheffield, England
- Genres: Electroclash
- Years active: 2000–2004
- Labels: Roadtrain Recordings; International DeeJay Gigolo Records
- Past members: Ben Rymer; Mark Hudson; Ross Orton

The Fat Truckers were a British electroclash group from Sheffield, comprising Ben Rymer, Mark Hudson, and Ross Orton. They toured in support of Jarvis Cocker, apparently wielding light sabres on stage and described themselves as writing songs about "cheap motorbikes, import-export business and multiplex cinemas - we're a social comment on modern living" and having a fondness of Henderson's Relish.

The band split up in 2004. Orton now works in production with Pulp's Steve Mackey, and has recently worked with M.I.A. Rymer DJs as part of Gucci Soundsystem, and Hudson has his own band, Meat for a Dark Day.

== The First Fat Truckers Album Is for Sale ==
The First Fat Truckers Album Is for Sale

Studio album by Fat Truckers
- Released: September 15, 2003
- Genre: Electronic
- Length: 46:59
- Label: Roadtrain Recordings
- Producer: Fat Truckers

The First Fat Truckers Album Is for Sale is the only album by Fat Truckers. It was released on September 15, 2003, through Roadtrain Recordings.

=== Critical reception ===
Professional ratings
Review scores
Source	Rating
AllMusic	3/5 stars
The Guardian	3/5 stars
Now	4/5 Ns
Muzik	4/5 stars
Uncut	1/5 stars

Adam Sweeting of The Guardian called it "quite a feat by the Truckers to have made an album so barbarically retro-techno. The drum machine sounds like something they found rusting on a council tip, and whatever they are using for keyboards probably came out of a Christmas cracker". Benjamin Boles of Now called it "a bit silly here and there, but so are the Ramones, so turn it up and pogo around your living room". Uncut said, "Unfortunately, the ideas do eventually run dry".

=== Track listing ===
1. "Teenage Daughter"
2. "Ron Is Back"
3. "Superbike"
4. "I Love Computers"
5. "Favvers Plimsoles"
6. "Anorexic Robot"
7. "I Love U Son"
8. "Roxy's"
9. "Lock 'n' Load"
10. "Fix It"

== Discography ==
=== Albums ===
- The First Fat Truckers Album Is for Sale (2003)

=== Singles ===
- "Superbike" (2001)
- "Teenage Daughter" (2001)
- "Anorexic Robot" (2003)

=== Remixes ===
- Louie Austen featuring Peaches - "Grab My Shaft" (2003)
