= Cogez =

Cogez is a surname. Notable people with the surname include:

- Caroline Sascha Cogez, Danish-French director and writer
- Anna Cogez
