= 99 Cents (Chicks on Speed album) =

Studio album by Chicks on Speed
- Released: 2003
- Genres: Electropop, electroclash
- Length: 53:57
- Label: Chicks On Speed
- Producers: Ramon Bauer, Glove, Gerard Potuznik, Mika Vainio, Cristian Vogel

Chicks on Speed chronology
The Re-Releases Of The Un-Releases (2000)	99 Cents (2003)	Press The Spacebar (2004)

Professional ratings
Review scores
Source	Rating
Allmusic	4/5 stars

99 Cents (stylized as 99¢) is an album by German electroclash trio Chicks on Speed. It was released in 2003 through Chicks On Speed Records and is the group's second album after Chicks On Speed Will Save Us All.

== Album information ==
A different approach to their apparent aim to expose the superficiality of pop culture, this album is heavily electronic and, with the exception of Tom Tom Club's "Wordy Rappinghood", features completely original material. The same track features a bevy of guests including Miss Kittin (who appears later on "Shick Shaving"), Anki Lepper (also known as "Acid Maria"), singers Jill Mingo, Kevin Blechdom, Soffy O and Inga Humpe, ADULT. member Nicola Kuperus, Tina Weymouth (who composed the lyrics and sang on the original) and all three members of Le Tigre.

As per usual, the album was rife with collaborators, though the Chicks (Melissa Logan, Alex Murray-Leslie and Kiki Moorse) were responsible for all of the album's lyrics and in part for the music. "We Don't Play Guitars", a sarcastic track featuring defiant input of an equally sarcastic nature and a guitar solo from Canadian rapper Peaches received some positive attention on Australia's youth radio, reaching 84 on the Hottest 100 2003 and was included on the compilation release for that year.

There was a mixed reaction by critics. While the positive reviews portrayed them as unique, sharp and trendy, the more unfavorable critics chose to label them as unappealing and clichéd in their lyrics.

== Track listing ==
No.	Title	Writer(s)	Length
1.	"Shooting from the Hip"	Bauer/Logan/Moorse/Murray-Leslie/Potuznik	4:40
2.	"We Don't Play Guitars" (featuring Peaches)	Hanreich/Hothomato/Kloss/Kluske/Logan/Moorse/Murray-Leslie	3:55
3.	"Wordy Rappinghood"	Frantz/Stanley/Weymouth	6:27
4.	"Coventry"	Logan/Moorse/Murray-Leslie/Potuznik	3:43
5.	"99 Cents"	Logan/Moorse/Murray-Leslie/Mynther/Neumann	3:34
6.	"Sell-Out"	Logan/Moorse/Murray-Leslie/Potuznik	3:54
7.	"Culture Vulture"	Logan/Moorse/Murray-Leslie/Mynther/Neumann	3:44
8.	"Universal Pussy"	Bauer/Logan/Moorse/Murray-Leslie/Potuznik	4:30
9.	"Love Life"	Logan/Moorse/Murray-Leslie/Mynther/Neumann	4:15
10.	"Shick Shaving" (featuring Miss Kittin)	Hervé/Logan/Moorse/Murray-Leslie/Mynther/Neumann	4:21
11.	"Fashion Rules" (includes "Flame On")	Logan/Moorse/Murray-Leslie/Mynther/Neumann; Logan/Moorse/Murray-Leslie/Vainio

A video clip for "We Don't Play Guitars", directed by Deborah Schamoni, is included.
