= We Don't Play Guitars =

Single by Chicks on Speed

from the album 99 Cents
- Released: October 2003
- Recorded: 2003
- Genre: Electroclash
- Songwriter(s): Hanreich; Hothomato; Kloss; Kluske; Logan; Moorse; Murray-Leslie

Chicks on Speed singles chronology
"We Don't Play Guitars" (2003)	"Wordy Rappinghood" (2003)

Peaches singles chronology
"Operate" (2003)	"We Don't Play Guitars" (2003)	"Kick It" (2004)

Music video
- "We Don't Play Guitars" on YouTube

"We Don't Play Guitars" is the first single from Chicks on Speed's album 99 Cents and features Peaches. It was placed at #84 on the Triple J Hottest 100, 2003.

== Critical reception ==
Dan Lett of Pitchfork Media commented that the song "is a gutsy, rambunctious melee that puts mantra before message."

== Music video ==
The music video for "We Don't Play Guitars" was directed by Deborah Schamoni costumes by Chicks on Speed and Kathi Glas

== Track listings ==
- German Vinyl, 12-inch single
1. "We Don't Play Guitars (Chicken Lips Play Dub Version)" - 11:04
2. "We Don't Play Guitars (Tiefschwarz Black Box Mix)" - 7:25
- UK CD single
1. "We Don't Play Guitars (Radio Version)" - 3:59
2. "We Don't Play Guitars (Beat To The Drum Mix)" - 7:11
3. "We Don't Play Guitars (Cristian Vogel Remix)" - 4:32

== Song usage ==
"We Don't Play Guitars" was included on the compilation albums FM4 Sound Selection 9 and Now 9.

== Charts ==
Chart (2003)	Peak Position
UK Singles Chart	77
