= Shake Yer Dix =

Single by Peaches

Single by Peaches

from the album Fatherfucker
- Released: May 24, 2004
- Genre: Electronica; electroclash
- Length: 3:32
- Label: XL Recordings
- Songwriter(s): Peaches
- Producer(s): Peaches

Peaches singles chronology
"Kick It" (2004)	"Shake Yer Dix" (2004)	"Downtown" (2006)

"Shake Yer Dix" is an electroclash song written and produced by Peaches, and featuring Mignon. The song was originally released as part of a double limited vinyl A-side along with the song "Operate". The song was later remixed by Tiga and rereleased as a single on May 24, 2004 in the UK.

== Critical reception ==
Andrew Magilow of Splendid Magazine gave a positive review, commenting that "a buzzing keyboard riff adds to the fun, as the techno-laden groove gets you in the mood." Conversely, Heather Phares of Allmusic opined that "the potty-grade sexuality of 'Shake Yer Dix,' could give the mistaken impression that Peaches is just rehashing her previous work with less creativity."

== Chart performance ==
"Shake Yer Dix" debuted and peaked at #97 on the UK Singles Chart, spending two weeks in the top 200. In addition, the song debuted and peaked at #27 on the Belgian Dance Chart and spent a total of two weeks on the chart.

== Track listings ==
- UK CD single
1. "Operate" – 3:28
2. "Shake Yer Dix" – 3:32
- UK (Tiga Remixes) CD single
1. "Shake Yer Dix" (Tiga's Where Were You in 92 Remix) – 6:21
2. "Shake Yer Dix" (Tiga's Where Were You in 92 Instrumental) – 6:21
3. "Shake Yer Dix" (Original Acappella) – 3:31

== Charts ==
Chart (2004)	Peak position
Belgium Dance (Ultratop Flanders)	27
Scotland (OCC)	88
UK Singles (OCC)	97
UK Dance (OCC)	1
