= Operate =

Single by Peaches

from the album Fatherfucker
- Released: September 8, 2003
- Genre: Electroclash; dance-punk
- Label: XL Recordings
- Songwriters: Peaches; Sticky Henderson
- Producer: Peaches

Peaches singles chronology
"Grab My Shaft" (2003)	"Operate" (2003)	"We Don't Play Guitars" (2003)

"Operate" is a song by Peaches from her second studio album Fatherfucker. It was written by Peaches and Sticky Henderson, and was released as a limited edition vinyl double A-side with "Shake Yer Dix" as the first single from the album.

== Track listing ==
- UK CD single
1. "Operate" – 3:28
2. "Shake Yer Dix" – 3:32

== Song usage ==
"Operate" has been used in movies Mean Girls and Waiting.... The song was also used in the American television series Las Vegas (episode title: New Orleans).

In 2017, following the release of Taylor Swift's "Look What You Made Me Do", some commentators suggested that the song sampled "Operate". Some speculated that the alleged sample was a reference to a Katy Perry tweet warning people to "watch out for the Regina George in sheep's clothing"; George appeared in the Mean Girls scene which featured the Peaches song. For a time, music annotation website Genius listed "Operate" as being sampled in the Swift single.

Writing for the Alternative Press, Maggie Dickman argued that Swift's song "clearly sounds like" the Peaches song, and also remarked that Swift's music video was similar to Peaches'. In an article for W, Kyle Munzenrieder argued that the beat in Swift's song sounded similar but not the same, since it was "cleaner and more toned down". In her liner notes, Swift credited a sample of the Right Said Fred song "I'm Too Sexy", but did not list the Peaches song as a sample.

== Charts ==
Chart (2003)	Peak position
UK Singles Chart	112
