= I Feel Cream =

2009 studio album by Peaches

Studio album by Peaches
- Released: May 1, 2009
- Recorded: 2008
- Studio: Studio Rapp (Berlin)
- Genres: Electroclash; synth-pop; electropunk; electro house; techno
- Length: 41:26
- Label: XL
- Producers: Digitalism; Drums of Death; Peaches; Shapemod; Simian Mobile Disco; Soulwax

Peaches chronology
Impeach My Bush (2006)	I Feel Cream (2009)	The Dark Side of the Moon (2009)

Singles from I Feel Cream
- 1. "Talk to Me"/"More" Released: April 27, 2009; 2. "Lose You" Released: July 6, 2009; 3. "I Feel Cream" Released: November 9, 2009

I Feel Cream is the fifth studio album by Canadian singer Peaches, released on May 1, 2009, by XL Recordings. The album was produced by Simian Mobile Disco, as well as Soulwax, Digitalism, Shapemod and Drums of Death.

== Promotion ==
In summer 2007, German band Sweet Machine was asked by Peaches to join her as her backing band for one show at the Berlin Festival. After this successful collaboration, Sweet Machine became her new full-time backing band. They performed together at the Exotic Erotic Ball 2007, the Hard New Year's Eve 2007 and also joined her Australia and New Zealand tour in 2008. In 2009, they teamed up again for a Peaches' I Feel Cream tour. Peaches and Sweet Machine also toured as part of the festivals Festival Internacional de Benicàssim and Get Loaded in the Park in August 2009. In 2010, Peaches and Sweet Machine once again toured Australia performing at the sold out Big Day Out festivals and at a series of sideshows. Peaches was supported on this tour by Shunda K who performed their collaboration "Billionaire", and was also the opening act.

On November 6, 2009, Peaches appeared on the Last Call with Carson Daly, where she performed the song "Talk to Me".

To promote I Feel Cream, Peaches released a music video for every song from the album. Musical group Ssion directed and starred in a Wizard of Oz-themed video for "Billionaire" that also features Shunda K of Yo Majesty. The video for "Show Stopper" was directed by Caroline Sascha Cogez, and stars Danish film actress Charlotte Munck. In the video, Peaches references and sings a snippet of Nina Hagen's song "New York / N.Y."

"Mud" was used in The Vampire Diaries episode "The Night of the Comet" and "Show Stopper" was featured in the Gossip Girl episode "How to Succeed in Bassness". "Mommy Complex" was used in an ad for the Citroën DS3 in 2012.

== Singles ==
The lead single is a double A-side of "Talk to Me" and "More". "Talk to Me" peaked at number 51 on the Austrian Singles Chart and at number 99 on the French Singles Chart.

"Lose You" was released as the album's second single on July 5, 2009. The song reached number 11 on the Belgian Dance Chart in Flanders.

The third and final single "I Feel Cream" was released on November 9, 2009.

== Critical reception ==
Professional ratings
Aggregate scores
Source	Rating
Metacritic	74/100
Review scores
Source	Rating
AllMusic	4/5 stars
The A.V. Club	B−
Los Angeles Times	3/4 stars
NME	7/10
The Observer	3/5 stars
Pitchfork	7.3/10
PopMatters	7/10
Rolling Stone	3/5 stars
Slant Magazine	3.5/5 stars
The Times	4/5 stars

I Feel Cream received generally favorable reviews from music critics. At Metacritic, which assigns a weighted mean rating out of 100 to reviews from mainstream critics, the album received an average score of 74, based on 22 reviews, which indicates "generally favorable reviews". AllMusic's Heather Phares noted that the album has "plenty of moments that aren't groundbreaking, but still show that Merill Nisker has a lot to say about sex, music, and pop culture nearly a decade after Teaches of Peaches was released." Los Angeles Times' Margaret Wappler commented that on I Feel Cream, Peaches "drops the Iggy Pop fetishism that distracted her last couple of albums and engages in elemental club throbbers, stripped down to equal parts fire and ice." She continued, "At times the minimalist compositions expose her limited range, but no one should be listening to Peaches for the pitch-defying melismas." Matthew Perpetua of Pitchfork opined, "Whereas it was beginning to seem that Peaches' shtick was an artistic dead end, there is now plenty of reason to believe that she may have the skills and vision necessary to produce interesting, emotionally affecting work well beyond menopause." Likewise, Slant Magazine's Eric Henderson claimed that "maybe age has softened Peaches a tad, but if I Feel Cream is the result, it sounds more compelling and radical than any number of new iterations of 'sucking on my titties.'"

The Times critic Peter Paphides expressed that "what strikes you on I Feel Cream is just how merely existing in a post-Gossip musical firmament has brought the Toronto singer's carnally empowered monologues within waving distance of the mainstream. And yet, with the exception of the clammy, catchy remonstrations of 'Talk to Me', this remains an album firmly rooted in the lineage of great electronic dance music." Tim Chester of the NME wrote, "The notoriously hardcore sexual aggressor has swapped strap-ons for sentiment and turned all flaccid in the process, and guess what: it's quite... nice." Rolling Stone's Caryn Ganz described the album as "part Lil' Kim, part Lita Ford and all hot mess" and added, "Though it hits only a few different notes, Peaches' bawdy pop feels like a refreshing breath of filthy air." In a review for PopMatters, Erin Lyndal Martin referred to I Feel Cream as "a fun and worthwhile album, though is unlikely to change any minds about Peaches. Fortunately, that also means she shows no signs of losing her touch." Emma Warren of The Observer gave the album three out of five stars, stating, "Ideology aside, this is a diverse album that retains her trademark dirty electro but on collaborations with Simian Mobile Disco still delights." However, Genevieve Koski of The A.V. Club felt that the album "feels subdued and safe, a less-than-inspiring move for an artist who made her name by being neither." Drowned in Sound's Alexander Tudor concluded, "Ultimately, Peaches shows herself developing, late in her career, but unlikely to infiltrate the market she's targeted."

Iguana magazine placed I Feel Cream at number 141 on its Albums of the Year 2009 list. It was ranked number 278 on The Village Voice's Pazz & Jop critics' poll of 2009.

Spin listed the album at number six on its 20 Worst Album Titles of 2009 list, writing, "Keep it in your hot pants, Merrill, you're 42."

== Commercial performance ==
I Feel Cream is Peaches' highest-charting album in the United States to date. It debuted and peaked at number 160 on the Billboard 200 with first-week sales of 3,000 copies, before falling off the chart completely the following week.

I Feel Cream became Peaches' first album to chart on the German Albums Chart, where it debuted and peaked at number 75 before falling to number 88 in its second week.

== Track listing ==
All tracks are written by Peaches and Gonzales, except where noted.

No.	Title	Writer(s)	Producer(s)	Length
1.	"Serpentine (I Don't Give A... Pt. 2)"	Peaches	Peaches	3:22
2.	"Talk to Me"		Soulwax; Shapemod^{[a]}	3:07
3.	"Lose You"	Peaches; Simian Mobile Disco	Simian Mobile Disco	3:34
4.	"More"	Peaches	Peaches; Shapemod^{[a]}	4:34
5.	"Billionaire"	Peaches; Gonzales; Shunda K	Simian Mobile Disco	3:26
6.	"I Feel Cream"	Peaches; Drums of Death; Simian Mobile Disco	Drums of Death; Shapemod; Peaches; Simian Mobile Disco^{[b]}	4:33
7.	"Trick or Treat"		Peaches	3:17
8.	"Show Stopper"		Peaches	2:17
9.	"Mommy Complex"	Peaches; Digitalism	Digitalism	2:57
10.	"Mud"		Simian Mobile Disco	3:08
11.	"Relax"		Peaches	3:29
12.	"Take You On"	Peaches	Peaches; Shapemod^{[a]}	3:44

iTunes Store and Japanese edition bonus tracks
No.	Title	Writer(s)	Producer(s)	Length
13.	"Billionaire" (vs. Drums of Death)	Peaches; Gonzales; Shunda K; Drums of Death	Simian Mobile Disco; Drums of Death^{[c]}	3:26
14.	"Lose You" (vs. Drums of Death)	Peaches; Simian Mobile Disco; Drums of Death	Simian Mobile Disco; Drums of Death^{[c]}	3:36

=== Double LP edition ===
The double LP edition also contains a digital download card, which allows you to download MP3s of this album through Beggars Group USA. The track listing of the download is in the same order as the LP release, not the CD release.

Side one
No.	Title	Length
1.	"Talk to Me"	3:09
2.	"More"	4:36
3.	"Mommy Complex"	2:58

Side two
No.	Title	Length
1.	"Billionaire"	3:28
2.	"Serpentine (I Don't Give A... Pt. 2)"	3:24
3.	"Relax"	3:31

Side three
No.	Title	Length
1.	"Lose You"	3:36
2.	"I Feel Cream"	4:35
3.	"Mud"	3:10

Side four
No.	Title	Length
1.	"Show Stopper"	2:19
2.	"Trick or Treat"	3:19
3.	"Take You On"	3:44

Notes

- ^{^a} signifies an additional producer.
- ^{^b} signifies a vocal producer.
- ^{^c} signifies a co-producer.

== Personnel ==
Credits adapted from the liner notes of I Feel Cream.

- Peaches – vocals (all tracks); production (tracks 1, 4, 6–8, 11, 12)
- Tom Ache – mastering
- Adam Cohen – photography (front and back cover)
- Digitalism – mixing, production (track 9)
- Drums of Death – production (track 6)
- AJ English – logo
- Elizabeth Goodwin – panel pics
- Shunda K – rap (track 5)
- Fubbi Karlsson – artwork, panel pics
- Conner Rapp – vocal recording (track 2); additional editing, additional vocal engineering (tracks 3, 7, 8)
- Shapemod – additional production (tracks 2, 4, 12); mixing, production (track 6)
- Simian Mobile Disco – mixing (tracks 1, 3–5, 7, 8, 10–12); production (tracks 3, 5, 10); additional production (track 6)
- Soulwax – mixing, production (track 2)
- Anthony Tran – panel pics

== Charts ==
Chart (2009)	Peak position
Australian Albums (ARIA)	65
Belgian Albums (Ultratop Flanders)	73
Belgian Alternative Albums (Ultratop Flanders)	33
French Albums (SNEP)	184
German Albums (Offizielle Top 100)	75
Swiss Albums (Schweizer Hitparade)	75
UK Albums (OCC)	152
UK Album Downloads (Official Charts)	97
UK Independent Albums (Official Charts)	14
US Billboard 200	160
US Top Dance Albums (Billboard)	5
US Independent Albums (Billboard)	23

== Release history ==
Region	Date	Label	Ref.
Germany	May 1, 2009	XL	
Netherlands	May 1, 2009	4AD	
Australia	May 4, 2009	XL; Remote Control	
United Kingdom	May 4, 2009	XL	
Canada	May 5, 2009	XL	
France	May 5, 2009	XL	
United States	May 5, 2009	XL	
Japan	May 13, 2009	Beggars Japan	
