= Mignon (musician) =

- Origin: Germany
- Genres: Punk rock, electronic, metal
- Occupations: Performer, songwriter, singer, DJ
- Instruments: Vocals, guitar, piano, organ, theremin
- Years active: 2001–present
- Website: http://www.mignonmusic.com

Mignon Baer is a international punk-rock and electronica musician. She is notable for her high energy stage shows and the use of provocative horror imagery.

== Music and performance ==
In 2001, Mignon began playing keyboard and performing in the theater play Bloody Daughters in Berlin's "Bar jeder Vernunft", starring Corinna Harfouch and Catherine Stoyan.

Following this she toured with Peaches in 2001 and 2002 as a performer and vocalist. Discovering a similar taste in music and a desire to shock audiences, they co-wrote and performed tracks together such as "Casanova" and "She's a Rebel". Jointly they have played in England at the Leeds and Reading Festival as well as Australia and New Zealand for the Big Day Out accompanied by Cobra Killer. They also supported Queens of the Stoneage and ...And You Will Know Us by the Trail of Dead on 16 tour dates in North America through the fall of 2002.

Mignon's solo career began in 2003 when she performed with an array of artists at festivals such as Larry Tee’s Electroclash Festival in New York and Arthur Baker's Return to New York Festival in London. During this time she also supported Ellen Allien and Chicks on Speed in Switzerland, as well as played other music festivals in Germany and France. She supported 'Trail of Dead' in Germany on their 2004 tour and undertook her own tour of California in 2005. Mignon has performed her solo shows at venues all across Europe.

In 2004, Mignon released an EP on Pale Music, which included remixes of three original tracks; "Demons of Love" where she united Adamski and Lady Miss Kier, "Death Race" remixed by Patric Catani and "Bad Girl" remixed by Suat G.

Mignon self-produced her debut album, Bad Evil Wicked and Mean, in Berlin and invited guests Lady Miss Kier, Peaches, Thomas Wydler (Nick Cave and the Bad Seeds), Gonzales and Taylor Savvy to contribute. The album was released in Europe, Japan and Australia in 2007.

Mignon played the role of Peaches ex-lover in the musical Peaches Does Herself in Berlin at the Hebbel Hau Theater 2010 and 2011.

In 2010, Mignon released her single "Hot Love" with dance remixes by Namosh and Bronstibock. The video featured the burlesque performer, Lada Redstar.

In 2011, Mignon released her second album, Kiss of Death, produced by Mignon and Rob Hill and supported Rob Zombie in Germany the same year.

In 2012, Mignon performed a metal DJ set with performance and costume changes, she also performed her original songs, supporting Marilyn Manson and Rob Zombie on the Twins of Evil Tour in Germany.

In 2019 Mignon supported ...And You Will Know Us by the Trail of Dead on tour in Germany and played the Dot to Dot Festival in Bristol

== Discography ==
=== Solo ===
2026: Single Release Fist in a Honeypot [Digital] BadGirl-Records

2026: Single Release This Crazy World [Digital] BadGirl-Records

2025: Single Release We're the Monsters [Digital} BadGirl-Records

2018: Mignon Toys Tantrum Vinyl LP and CD
2011: Mignon Kiss of Death CD Impedance Records
2010: Mignon Hot Love EP BadGirl-Records
2007: Mignon Bad Evil Wicked and Mean [CD] BadGirl-Records
2004: Mignon Bad Girl EP Pale Music

=== Contributing artist ===
- 2003: Peaches Fatherfucker XL Recordings "Shake Yer Dix" vocals
- 2002: Taylor Savvy Ladies and Gentlemen Kitty-Yo Vocals on "She's Got It," "Boys and Girls," "Everybody Party," and "Ladies"
- 2002: Peaches The Teaches of Peaches XL Recordings "Casanova" collaboration

=== Various artist compilations ===
- 2010: Ich Bin Ein Berliner Araknid Records "Hot Love"
- 2006: Girlmonster Chicks on Speed records "Demons of love"
- 2006: Some Tunes Basserk "Death Race Remix"
- 2006: Styles Selection Toshiba/EMI Japan "Death Race"
- 2005: Berlin Insane III Pale Music "Succubus"
- 2005: Party Escalator Escalator Records "Bad Girl"
- 2004: Agenda 2010 Lage D'Or "Little Miss Feelgood"
- 2003: Lexoleum Trilogy Lex Records "Casanova"
- 2002: Wir Lage D'Or "Bad, Evil, Wicked and Mean"
- 2002: Colette No 4 Colette Records "Bad Evil Wicked and Mean"
- 2002: Y03 Lage D'Or "Bad Evil Wicked and Mean"

== Contributing movies ==
- 2012 Peaches Does Herself Film; Mignon plays Peaches Ex-Lover singing "Lovertits", a little boy and Laserharp-Player
- 2007 MTV Bust a Move "Bad Girl"
- 2006 "Kampfansage der letzte Schüler" DVD release Germany "Black Soul"
- 2004 "Clash of Cultures: The Rise of the Electro Scene" DVD release Brazil "Bad, Evil, Wicked and Mean"
