= Generation Hexed =

Studio album by Drums of Death
- Released: 23 August 2010
- Genre: Rave; synthpop
- Label: Greco-Roman

Generation Hexed is the debut studio album of Scottish electronic musician Drums of Death.

== Composition ==
Generation Hexed is a rave synthpop album; while it does it have elements from a variety of genres such as disco, its influences mostly stem from 1990s dance music.

The Line of Best Fit critic Steve Lampiris noted the album's undertone of nostalgia for video games, dance and gothic scene music of the 1980s. "Creak" has a synth riff in the style of a Castlevania game, while "Everything All At Once"'s "spiraling" synthesizer line has a similar feel to The Legend of Zelda. Lampiris described "London Teeth" as a more industrial version of a track from Depeche Mode's Violator (1990), and analogized "Modern Age"'s instrumental as one of the early songs by singer Kylie Minogue. Generation Hexed also takes influence from modern pop as well, one example being "Karaoke", a track which opens the record. The song only consists of a hymnal-esque vocal section and "minimal keyboard chimes," giving it a primitive Animal Collective-style vibe, writes Lampiris.

== Critical reception ==
Professional ratings
Review scores
Source	Rating
Clash	8/10
Contactmusic.com	3/10
Drowned in Sound	9/10
Fact	3.5/5
Loud and Quiet	8/10
Mojo	3/5 stars
musicOMH	3.5/5 stars
Q	3/5 stars
Resident Advisor	3/5
State	3/5 stars

Generation Hexed holds an aggregate 6.4 out of ten on the website AnyDecentMusic? based on nine reviews. Clash magazine's Joe Gamp described Generation Hexed as "fresh, organic and from the heart," writing that "there’s something here for all as he experiments with the pop mould." Adam Johns of Drowned in Sound honored the record for how "expertly" the tracks were crafted: "The song structures here are expertly crafted and demonstrate an individual who’s not content just to make tracks. And this discontentedness has resulted in some serious bangers."

Lampiris called Generation Hexed a "stellar disc" for fans of rave music, but felt the influences were too evident on most of the tracks: "For album number two Bailey should embrace the idea that wearing your influences on your sleeve only works for so long before it’s called a rip-off." musicOMH wrote that the album had "everything expected of a dance record," but also wrote that it didn't bring anything new to dance music. A State magazine reviewer found the record to be "slightly lacking" for those who enjoyed Drums of Death's live performances. He wrote that it "promises much but can’t quite deliver" given that it's "more a clubnight adventure than a sit-down and listen album." Resident Advisor praised the instrumentals, but felt the LP was lacking in vocal parts and wasn't "excellent" due to this: "Pop music (on anyone's terms) is nothing without a vocalist." In contrast, a Fact magazine reviewer felt the vocal parts were unsuitable with the instrumentals on tracks such as "Along these Plains," "Modern Age, "and "Lonely Days."

In a mixed review, BBC Music criticized the album for being "derivative" of other acts, most prominently LCD Soundsystem: "There are moments [...] when it’s possible to imagine a much better Drums of Death album than this. In its present incarnation, though, Bailey’s freshman effort is distant from that ideal." Alastair Thompson of Contactmusic.com heavily panned Generation Hexed mainly for Bailey's lead vocal performance, writing that he should've hired guest performers: "'Karaoke' couldn't have been more apt for a man with a voice flatter than Simon Cowell's head with an encyclopaedia on it."

== Release history ==
Region	Date	Format(s)	Label
United Kingdom	23 August 2010	Digital download; CD; Vinyl	Greco-Roman
Europe; Japan	September 2010	Digital download; CD; Vinyl	Greco-Roman
