= Grab My Shaft =

Single by Louie Austen featuring Peaches

from the album Only Tonight
- Released: 2003
- Recorded: 2003
- Genre: Electroclash
- Length: 7:13
- Label: Instant Karma

Peaches singles chronology
"Rock Show" (2003)	"Grab My Shaft" (2003)	"Operate" (2003)

"Grab My Shaft" is a single by Louie Austen featuring Canadian electronic musician Peaches.

== Critical reception ==
Charlie Amter of East Bay Express that the duet with Peaches results in a "sick triple-X South Beach dance floor anthem that manages to be both hilarious and sexual at the same time." Likewise, Louis Pattinson of NME praised Peaches' rapping and commented that the "extremely lewd" song was the "best of all" of Only Tonight's tracks.

== Track listing ==
- UK 12-inch single
1. "Grab My Shaft (Richard X Remix)" - 4:31
2. "Grab My Shaft (Original Mix)" - 7:13
3. "Grab My Shaft (Playgroup Mix)" - 6:05
4. "Grab My Shaft (Fat Truckers Bung Bung Hardcore Mix)" - 4:44
5. "Amore" -

== Song usage ==
"Grab My Shaft" was included on the DJ mix album Lektroluv by Dr Lektroluv.

== Charts ==
Chart (2003)	Peak Position
UK Singles Chart	117
