= Peaches Goes Bananas =

2024 French-Belgian documentary film

- Film poster
- Directed by: Marie Losier
- Produced by: Sebastian Andres; Carole Chassaing; Alice Lemainre
- Starring: Peaches
- Cinematography: Marie Losier
- Edited by: Aël Dallier-Vega
- Production companies: Michigan Films; Tamara Films
- Distributed by: Norte Distribution; Galeries Distribution
- Release date: February 17, 2024 (Venice)
- Running time: 73 minutes
- Countries: France; Belgium
- Language: English

Peaches Goes Bananas is a French-Belgian documentary film, directed by Marie Losier and released in 2024. The film is a profile of Canadian electroclash musician Peaches.

It was the second of two documentary films about Peaches to premiere in 2024, following Teaches of Peaches. Peaches described the two films as very different from each other, stating that "one is more of a documentary of a certain album at a certain place in time, [whereas] Marie's film – well, I don't even consider it documentary. It's more of a painting, a portrait. Marie gets excited about an artist and then goes her own way."

The film premiered at the 81st Venice International Film Festival.
