= Teaches of Peaches =

2024 German documentary film

- Directed by: Philipp Fussenegger; Judy Landkammer
- Written by: Susanne Heuer; Cordula Kablitz-Post; Schyda Vasseghi
- Produced by: Cordula Kablitz-Post
- Starring: Peaches
- Cinematography: Dino Osmanoviç
- Edited by: Judy Landkammer
- Production company: Avanti Media
- Distributed by: Farbfilm-Verleih
- Release date: February 17, 2024 (Berlin)
- Running time: 102 minutes
- Country: Germany
- Languages: English; German

Teaches of Peaches is a German documentary film, directed by Philipp Fussenegger and Judy Landkammer and released in 2024. The film is a profile of Canadian musician Peaches, during her 2022 concert tour marking the 20th anniversary of her breakthrough album The Teaches of Peaches.

Other figures appearing in the film include Peaches' frequent collaborators Feist, Chilly Gonzales and Shirley Manson.

The film premiered at the 74th Berlin International Film Festival, where it won a Teddy Award for Best LGBTQ Documentary.

It was the first of two documentary films about Peaches to premiere in 2024, preceding Marie Losier's Peaches Goes Bananas. Peaches described the two films as very different from each other, stating that "one is more of a documentary of a certain album at a certain place in time, [whereas] Marie’s film – well, I don’t even consider it documentary. It’s more of a painting, a portrait. Marie gets excited about an artist and then goes her own way."
