= Drums of Death (musician) =

- Birth name: Colin Bailey
- Origin: Oban, Scotland
- Genres: House, techno, alternative dance
- Occupation(s): Songwriter, producer, DJ, remixer
- Years active: 2008–present
- Labels: Black Butter Records, Civil Music, Greco-Roman Recordings

Colin Bailey, better known by his stage name Drums of Death, is a London-based electronic musician, originally from Scotland. His music is a blend of techno, house, and electro. He is known for energetic and exciting live shows and has said in interviews that his debut album is all "Love songs and rave horns".

Drums of Death worked on Peaches' album I Feel Cream, producing and co-writing the title track as well as a 40-minute mixtape of remixes of several of Peaches' other songs (released in early 2009 by XL Recordings). Drums of Death has toured the US and Canada with Hot Chip (2008) and Peaches (2009) and remixed artists such as Tricky and Franz Ferdinand. He has also toured extensively through Europe and the UK, performing at music festivals.

Drums of Death has released two 12" vinyl singles on the Greco-Roman record label and a video for the second single "Got Yr Thing". In 2008 a limited edition 12" picture disc called Dodfucksupanescorttune (a legit bootleg of the song "Starlight" by Escort) was released on Civil Music. In 2009 Drums of Death created a DJ mix for the Resident Advisor Podcasts. There was also a special version of the new original song "Lonely Days" made for inclusion in Toddla T's Fabric Live mix CD. Drums of Death's first album, Generation Hexed, was released on the Greco-Roman record label on 6 September 2010.

From 2011 through to 2012 Drums of Death released three 12" EPs called "Black Waves", "Red Waves" and "Blue Waves" on Civil Music. Following this was the digital release "This Night / Bang The Dub" on the same label. In August 2013 the new single "True" featuring Yasmin Shahmir was released on Black Butter Records. At some point in 2012/2013 he also ceased wearing the mask that he had worn as Drums of Death.

In recent years he has written and produced for artists such as Azealia Banks and Ryan Ashley. A version of Drums of Death's song "Fierce" featuring vocals by Azealia Banks was used in an ASOS Commercial in 2013.

== Discography ==
=== LPs ===
- 2010: Generation Hexed

=== EPs and singles ===
- 2008: Dodfucksupanescorttune (12", single)
- 2008: Drums of Death Steps into The Ring EP (12", EP)
- 2009: Got Yr Thing (Single)
- 2011: Black Waves EP (12", EP)
- 2011: Red Waves EP (12", EP)
- 2012: Blue Waves EP (12", EP)
- 2013: This Night / Bang The Dub (Digital)
- 2013: True (Digital)

=== Other releases ===
- 2008: "Ozzy" (MP3 single)
- 2009: "RA.165" (MP3 single)

=== Remixes ===
- Tricky "Council Estate" (Domino)
- Franz Ferdinand "What She Came For" (Domino)
- Hot Chip "One Life Stand" (Parlophone)
