= Kick It (Peaches song) =

Single by Peaches featuring Iggy Pop

from the album Fatherfucker
- Released: January 5, 2004
- Label: XL
- Songwriter: Peaches
- Producer: Peaches

Peaches singles chronology
"We Don't Play Guitars" (2003)	"Kick It" (2004)	"Shake Yer Dix" (2004)

Iggy Pop singles chronology
"Little Know It All" (2004)	"Kick It" (2004)

Music video
- "Kick It" on YouTube

"Kick It" is a collaboration between Peaches and Iggy Pop and is the third single from the album Fatherfucker.

== Critical reception ==
Tim Jonze of NME commented that the song is "splattered with sleaze and sharp as a blade," and that "this is rock'n'roll how it should be played." Conversely, Heather Phares of Allmusic described that the song "should be more exciting than it actually it is."

== Music video ==
The music video for "Kick It" was directed by Dawn Shadforth and Alex Smith. It shows Peaches and Iggy fighting against some zombies. The video begins with zombies walking on the streets while Peaches and Iggy are yelling the lyrics at each other. They hit the zombies throughout the video until they've beaten them all down.

== Track listing ==
1. "Kick It (Featuring Iggy Pop)" – 2:32
2. "Felix Partz Remake (featuring Gonzales)" – 2:58

== Song usage ==
In 2004, the song was included on the Big Day Out 04 compilation album, the soundtrack for Midnight Club 3: DUB Edition, and it was featured in the Best Action Sequence category at the 2004 MTV Movie Awards to highlight the battle of Gondor scene from The Lord of the Rings: The Return of the King. In addition, "Kick It" was featured on the commercial in Australia for the 2008 Subaru Impreza.

== Charts ==
Chart (2004)	Peak position
Australia (ARIA)	195
UK Singles Chart	39
