= Impeach My Bush =

Studio album by Peaches
- Released: July 7, 2006
- Studios: Echo Studio (Los Angeles, California); Hot Pie Recording (Pasadena, California); Poolhause II; Seedy Underbelly (Valley Village, California)
- Genres: Electronic; glam rock
- Length: 41:08
- Label: XL
- Producers: Greg Kurstin; Peaches; Micky Petralia

Peaches chronology
Fatherfucker (2003)	Impeach My Bush (2006)	I Feel Cream (2009)

Singles from Impeach My Bush
- 1. "Downtown" Released: July 3, 2006; 2. "Boys Wanna Be Her" Released: November 6, 2006

Impeach My Bush is the fourth studio album by Canadian singer Peaches, released on July 7, 2006, by XL Recordings. The album includes guest appearances by Joan Jett, Beth Ditto, Josh Homme, Samantha Maloney, David Catching, Mocky and her one-time roommate Feist.

== Writing and development ==
Early sessions of Impeach My Bush were recorded at Peaches' Berlin studio with Eagles of Death Metal singer Jesse "The Devil" Hughes. She finished recording the album with producers Mickey Petralia and Greg Kurstin at Jeff Porcaro's (Toto) self-built studio in Los Angeles.

== Composition ==
The album draws from glam rock, punk, and electro. Lyrically, Impeach My Bush continues the explicit references, double entendres, and gender politics of Peaches' two previous albums. "Two Guys (For Every Girl)" deals with threesomes while "Rock the Shocker" centers on foreplay. "Stick It to the Pimp" is a backlash against hip hop chauvinism.

== Promotion ==
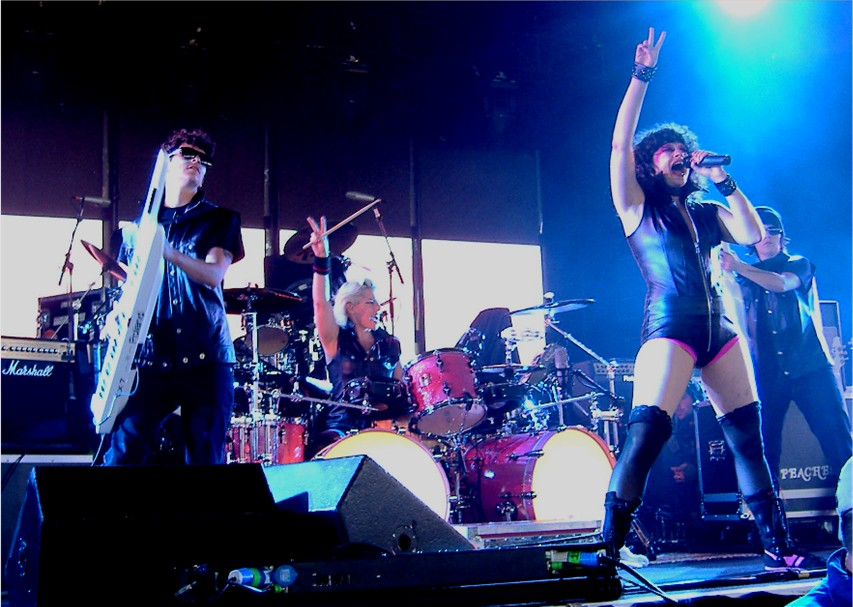
Peaches and the Herms performing in July 2006

Peaches formed the Herms (short for hermaphrodites) in early 2006 as her live backing band. Herms members included Samantha Maloney (Hole), JD Samson (Le Tigre), and Radio Sloan. "Herms" is a reference to the 1970s duo Peaches & Herb and blending of words her and him. Peaches and Herms were the opening act for Nine Inch Nails and Bauhaus during the second half of their 2006 summer US tour. Peaches and Herms also toured as part of the Australian festival Big Day Out and the 2007 Coachella Valley Music and Arts Festival.

"Do Ya" was used in the Gap clothing commercials for the fall 2006 season. "Do Ya" also appeared in the 2006 horror film All the Boys Love Mandy Lane. In addition, "You Love It" was played at the ending of the CSI: NY season three episode "Oedipus Hex" on October 18, 2006, and "Tent in Your Pants" was used in the 2007 comedy film Young People Fucking. On April 13, 2007, Peaches appeared on the season two premiere of The Henry Rollins Show, where she performed the song "Hit It Hard".

Peaches directed a music video for "Get It", which debuted on May 7, 2008, as part of the third season of SHOWstudio.com's series of fashion films titled Political Fashion, which was developed by British director Nick Knight. In 2013, the song "Downtown" was used in a commercial to promote Downtown Milwaukee, Wisconsin.

== Singles ==
"Downtown" was released as the album's lead single on July 3, 2006. It received positive reviews for its disco sound and sexual lyrics. The single peaked at number 50 on the UK Singles Chart. "Boys Wanna Be Her" was released as the second and final single on November 6, 2006.

== Critical reception ==
Professional ratings
Aggregate scores
Source	Rating
Metacritic	74/100
Review scores
Source	Rating
AllMusic	4/5 stars
Entertainment Weekly	C
Los Angeles Times	2/4 stars
musicOMH	3/5 stars
NME	8/10
The Observer	4/5 stars
Pitchfork	6.5/10
Rolling Stone	3/5 stars
Slant Magazine	2.5/5 stars
Spin	2/5 stars

Impeach My Bush received generally favorable reviews from music critics. At Metacritic, which assigns a weighted mean rating out of 100 to reviews from mainstream critics, the album received an average score of 74, based on 22 reviews, which indicates "generally favorable reviews". Heather Phares of AllMusic said, "Even if it's not as traffic-stopping as her debut, this album suggests that she can keep her music interesting for the long haul. Likewise, Tony Naylor of the NME commented that the album "is no great sonic leap forward, but it is a near-perfect distillation of Peaches' 'thing'." Conversely, Dan Marton of The Observer opined, "After three albums, though, Nisker has pushed the sexual warrior princess routine as far as it can go."

Impeach My Bush ranked at number 36 on eMusic's Best Albums of 2006 list. The album earned Peaches a nomination for Outstanding Music Artist at the 18th GLAAD Media Awards.

== Commercial performance ==
Impeach My Bush spent one week on the US Billboard 200 at number 168, selling 5,000 copies its first week.

== Track listing ==
All tracks are written by Peaches, except where noted. All tracks are produced by Peaches and Mickey Petralia, except where noted.

No.	Title	Writer(s)	Producer(s)	Length
1.	"Fuck or Kill"			0:49
2.	"Tent in Your Pants"	Peaches; Greg Kurstin	Kurstin; Peaches; Petralia	2:52
3.	"Hit It Hard"	Peaches; Samantha Maloney (additional beat); Vice Cooler (additional melody)		3:25
4.	"Boys Wanna Be Her"			3:55
5.	"Downtown"	Peaches; Kurstin	Kurstin; Peaches; Petralia	3:31
6.	"Two Guys (For Every Girl)"			4:04
7.	"Rock the Shocker"	Peaches; Maloney (additional beat)		3:00
8.	"You Love It"			3:00
9.	"Slippery Dick"			3:02
10.	"Give 'er"	Peaches (also guitar lead); Cornelius Rapp (guitar lead)		3:01
11.	"Get It"			4:05
12.	"Do Ya"			2:35
13.	"Stick It to the Pimp"			3:49

Japanese edition bonus disc
No.	Title	Writer(s)	Length
1.	"Make Me"	Peaches; Kurstin	3:24
2.	"Hanky Code"		4:03
3.	"Damage"		3:23
4.	"Fan Etiquette"	Peaches; Kathleen Daignault; Maren Hancock	3:14
5.	"Downtown" (Simian Mobile Disco Remix)	Peaches; Kurstin	6:20

== Personnel ==
Credits adapted from the liner notes of Impeach My Bush.

- Peaches – vocals, production; guitar (tracks 3, 4, 12); beat programming, keyboards (tracks 3, 6, 7, 9, 11, 13); lead guitar, rhythm guitar (track 10); dancers photo
- "Darlin" Dave Catching – guitar (track 8)
- Jerry DiRienzo – EBow guitar, guitar (track 12)
- Beth Ditto – chorus vocals (track 6)
- Feist – backing vocals (track 10)
- Josh Homme – guitar (track 10)
- Janager – finger snaps, handclaps (track 3)
- Joan Jett – guitar, vocals (track 8)
- Greg Kurstin – beat programming (tracks 1, 2, 5); keyboards (tracks 2–7, 11–13); production (tracks 2, 5)
- Samantha Maloney – drums (tracks 8, 10, 12)
- Mocky – backup moans (track 7)
- Brian "Big Hands" O'Connor – bass (tracks 8, 12)
- Micky Petralia – mixing, production (all tracks); live drums (track 3); beat programming (tracks 4, 9); drums (track 12)
- Tyler Shields – cover, poster
- Jacques Wait – studio photos

== Charts ==
Chart (2006)	Peak position
Australian Albums (ARIA)	70
Australian Dance Albums (ARIA)	8
French Albums (SNEP)	156
UK Albums (OCC)	132
UK Dance Albums (Official Charts)	3
UK Independent Albums (Official Charts)	13
US Billboard 200	168
US Top Dance Albums (Billboard)	5
US Independent Albums (Billboard)	13

== Release history ==
Region	Date	Label	Ref.
Germany	July 7, 2006	XL	
Japan	July 8, 2006	Hostess	
United Kingdom	July 10, 2006	XL	
Canada	July 11, 2006	XL	
United States	July 11, 2006	XL	
