= Fatherfucker =

Studio album by Peaches
- Released: September 23, 2003
- Studio: Studio Rapp (Berlin)
- Genres: Electroclash; dance-punk; electropunk
- Length: 38:10
- Label: XL
- Producers: Peaches; Joan Jett

Peaches chronology
The Teaches of Peaches (2000)	Fatherfucker (2003)	Impeach My Bush (2006)

Singles from Fatherfucker
- 1. "Operate"/"Shake Yer Dix" Released: September 8, 2003; 2. "Kick It" Released: January 5, 2004; 3. "Shake Yer Dix" Released: May 24, 2004

Fatherfucker is the third studio album by Canadian singer Peaches, released on September 23, 2003, by XL Recordings. Cover versions of Electric Six's "Gay Bar" and Berlin's "Sex (I'm a ...)" are included as bonus tracks.

== Writing and development ==
Peaches penned and programmed all the music for Fatherfucker herself. She wrote "Kick It" specifically for Iggy Pop, and the two teamed up in Miami in March 2003 to record it. Peaches told Rolling Stone, "The song is more about rock 'n' roll than sex."

== Composition ==
Musically, Fatherfucker is more rock-oriented than The Teaches of Peaches. "I Don't Give A..." samples the Joan Jett song "Bad Reputation" as Peaches yells, "I don't give a fuck!" and "I don't give a shit!" during the song.

== Promotion ==
To promote Fatherfucker, Peaches toured as the opening act on Marilyn Manson's 2003 European tour. Peaches also toured as part of the 2004 State of Exit festival in Novi Sad, Serbia. "Operate" is played during the Halloween house party scene in the 2004 film Mean Girls. On May 8, 2005, Peaches performed the song "I U She" in an episode of season two of The L Word, titled "L'Chaim".

Peaches and Maxx Ginnane directed a promotional video for "Tombstone, Baby" that features Ella Ferrante and Billi Lime dancing with knives and cutting each other's clothing. "Tombstone, Baby" was included on the compilation album FM4 Sound Selection 9. "The Inch" was used in the 2007 comedy films Itty Bitty Titty Committee and Young People Fucking, as well as in the 2011 romantic comedy film Getting That Girl.

== Singles ==
"Operate"/"Shake Yer Dix" was released as a limited-edition 12-inch single on September 8, 2003. It peaked at number 112 on the UK Singles Chart.

"Kick It" was released as the album's second single on January 5, 2004. It features Iggy Pop and received positive reviews from the NME. It became Peaches' second top 40 entry in the United Kingdom, peaking at number 39.

"Shake Yer Dix" was remixed by Tiga and re-released as the album's third and final single on May 24, 2004.

== Critical reception ==
Professional ratings
Aggregate scores
Source	Rating
Metacritic	70/100
Review scores
Source	Rating
AllMusic	3.5/5 stars
Alternative Press	3/5
Entertainment Weekly	B+
The Guardian	3/5 stars
Mojo	4/5 stars
Pitchfork	3.5/10
Q	4/5 stars
Rolling Stone	3/5 stars
Spin	B
Uncut	4/5 stars

Fatherfucker received generally favorable reviews from music critics. At Metacritic, which assigns a weighted mean rating out of 100 to reviews from mainstream critics, the album received an average score of 70, based on 20 reviews, which indicates "generally favorable reviews". Heather Phares of AllMusic described Fatherfucker as "neither the triumph or the disaster that it could've been." Similarly, Andy Battaglia of The A.V. Club wrote that "nearly all of Fatherfucker falls back into ostensibly bracing anthems that sound plain stupid in such abundance." Robert Christgau named "I Don't Give A..." as a "Choice Cut".

The NME ranked Fatherfucker at number 29 on its 50 Best Albums of 2003 list. The album was ranked at number 49 on Q magazine's list of The 50 Best Albums of 2003. Drowned in Sound placed it at number 73 on its list of the Top 75 Albums of 2003. The Village Voice ranked Fatherfucker at number 157 on its Pazz & Jop critics' poll of 2003. The Wire included Fatherfucker on its 50 Records of the Year list for 2003. In October 2009, Gigwise placed the album cover at number 40 on The 50 Best Album Covers of the 2000s. Fatherfucker earned Peaches a nomination for Outstanding Music Artist at the 15th GLAAD Media Awards, but lost out to Rufus Wainwright.

== Commercial performance ==
Fatherfucker became Peaches' first album to chart in the United States. Despite debuting at number 35 on the Top Heatseekers chart and at number 33 on the Independent Albums chart, the album spent only one week on both charts. Nevertheless, Fatherfucker peaked at number five on the Top Electronic Albums chart, where it spent a total of eight weeks. As of July 2006, Fatherfucker had sold 40,000 copies worldwide.

== Track listing ==
All tracks are written by Peaches, except where noted. All tracks are produced by Peaches, except where noted.

No.	Title	Writer(s)	Producer(s)	Length
1.	"I Don't Give A..."	Peaches; Joan Jett	Peaches; Jett	1:22
2.	"I'm the Kinda"			3:31
3.	"I U She"			2:45
4.	"Kick It" (featuring Iggy Pop)			2:31
5.	"Operate"	Peaches; Sticky Henderson		3:29
6.	"Tombstone, Baby"			3:08
7.	"Shake Yer Dix" (featuring Mignon)	Peaches; Gonzales		3:34
8.	"Rock 'n' Roll" (featuring Feedom)	Peaches; Feedom		4:12
9.	"Stuff Me Up" (featuring Taylor Savvy)	Peaches; Taylor Savvy		3:13
10.	"Back It Up, Boys"			3:59
11.	"The Inch"			3:21
12.	"Bag It"			3:05

Limited edition bonus EP
No.	Title	Writer(s)	Length
1.	"Get Me Off" (vs. Basement Jaxx)	Peaches; Felix Buxton; Simon Ratcliffe	3:13
2.	"Gay Bar"	Tyler Spencer	2:02
3.	"Sex (I'm a ...)"	John Crawford; Terri Nunn; David Diamond	3:40

== Personnel ==
Credits adapted from the liner notes of Fatherfucker.

- Peaches – vocals, production
- Cornelius Rapp – engineering (all tracks); mixing (tracks 6, 12)
- Feedom – performer (track 8)
- Janice Gaffney – photography
- Gonzales – additional drums (tracks 4, 5)
- Hadley Hudson – photography
- Iggy Pop – vocals (track 4)
- Joan Jett – production (track 1)
- Renaud Letang – mixing (tracks 1–5, 7–12)
- Mignon Baer – additional vocals (track 7)
- Thomas Moulin – mixing assistance
- Nilesh Patel – mastering
- Walter Schönauer – artwork
- Conrad Ventur – photography

== Charts ==
Chart (2003)	Peak position
Australian Albums (ARIA)	132
French Albums (SNEP)	132
Scottish Albums (Official Charts)	69
UK Albums (Official Charts)	93
UK Dance Albums (OCC)	3
UK Independent Albums (Official Charts)	14
US Top Dance Albums (Billboard)	5
US Independent Albums (Billboard)	33
US Heatseekers Albums (Billboard)	35
