= Louie Austen =

Austrian crooner in the electronic music scene (born 1946)

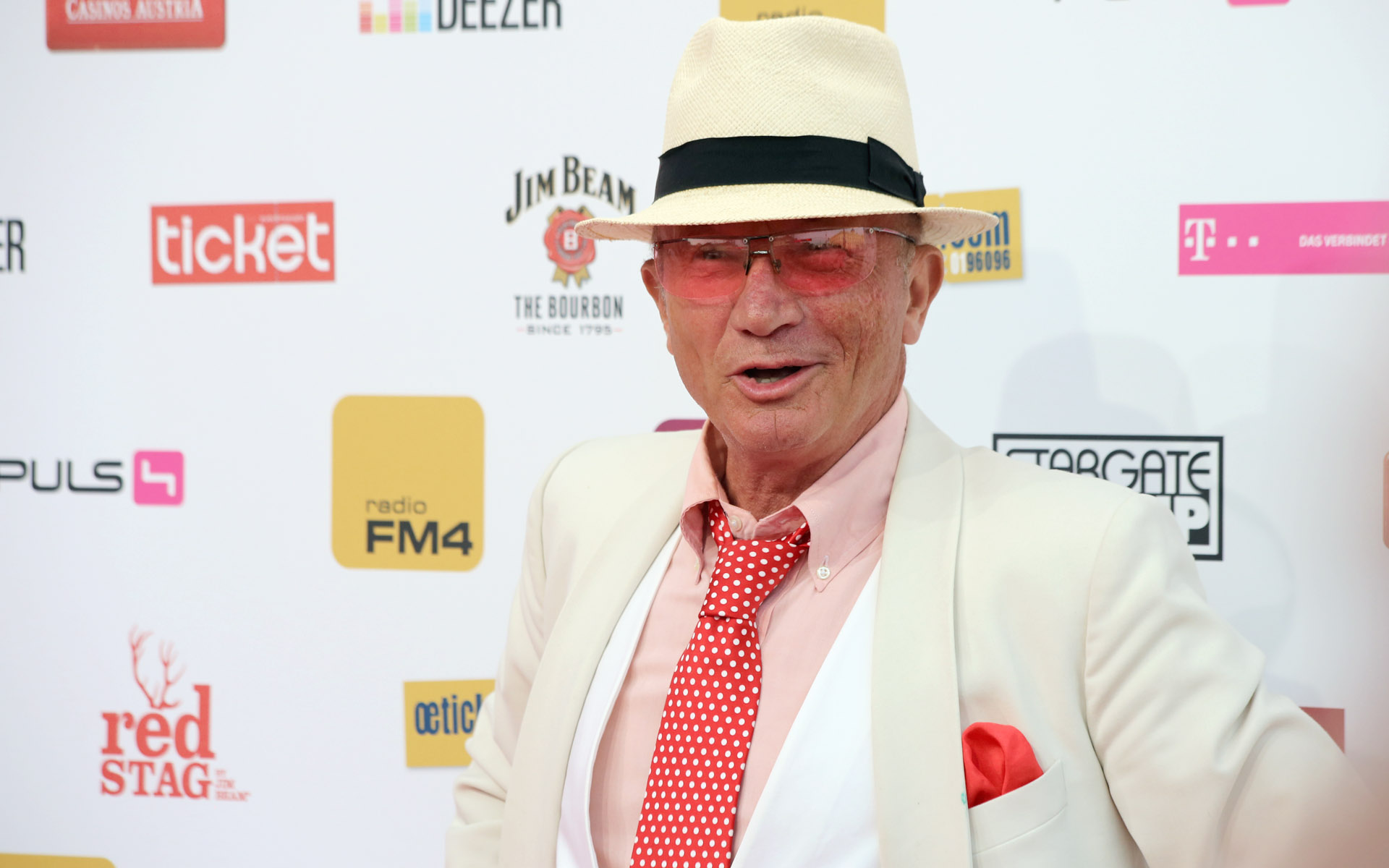
- Austen in 2013

Background information
- Born: Alois Luef; 19 September 1946 (age 79)
- Origin: Vienna, Austria
- Genres: Jazz, Electronic, Hip hop, Pop
- Occupations: Singer, crooner, musician
- Instruments: Vocals, piano, guitar
- Years active: 1999–present
- Labels: Cheap Records, Kitty-Yo, Tirk Recordings, LA Music
- Website: http://www.louieausten.com/

Louie Austen (born Alois Luef on 19 September 1946) is an Austrian classically trained bar and jazz crooner who has been active in the electronic music scene.

== Biography ==
Austen was born on 19 September 1946 in Vienna, Austria.

Austen, among other cultural and musical activities, played a part in an adaption of Johann Nestroy's play "Höllenangst" at the Viennese Burgtheater and, as of 2007, was regularly still performing every Saturday at the Cascade Bar of the Marriott hotel in Vienna.

Since 1999, Louie Austen has also been a performer in electronic music and has released many albums and singles in this genre he refers to as electrocrooning. His last album, Iguana, was released on Klein Records in 2006, and his new double album Last Man Crooning / Electrotaining You! was released in 2010, along with two singles, and is his seventh studio album on his own label LA Music – Louie Austen Music, which he founded in 2007 as a home for his musical releases.

Austen has a cameo as a gambler in Stefan Ruzowitzky's film The Counterfeiters, which won Best Foreign Language Film at the 2008 Oscars.

== Discography ==
=== Albums ===
- Consequences (1999 album)
- Only Tonight (2001 album)
- Easy Love (2003 album)
- Heaven's Floor (2005 EP)
- Hear my Song: The Best Of Louie Austen (2006 album)
- Iguana (2006 album)
- Summer Love EP (2007)
- Dreams Are My Reality EP (2007)
- Too Good To Last EP (2008)
- "Myamy EP" (2009, Digital)
- "Coconut Girl Remixes" (2009, Digital)
- "Take your time" Ada Fijal. Louie Austen
- "Endless Love" Phonique feat. Louie Austen. Track from album "Kissing Strangers" label Dessous (2010)
- "Estate" (2010) ep track for Rodion
- "Make Your Move Ruede Hagelstein Rmx" (2010, Vinyl)
- "Paris / Make Your Move Remixes" (2010, Digital-Single)
- "Last Man Crooning / Electrotaining You!" (2010, Double album – 2CD)
- "I Wander / Now Or Never Remixes" (2010, Digital-Single)
- "What a Comeback!" (2012, Digital-Single)

=== Singles ===
- "Amore" (2001)
- "Hoping" (2001)
- "Grab My Shaft" (feat. Peaches) (2003) No. 117 UK
- "Open Up Your Heart" (with Korsakow) (2005)
- "More" (2005)
- "Disco Dancer" (2006)
- "Glamour Girl" (2006)
- "Der Kreislauf"- with Remute (2011)
