= Chicks on Speed Will Save Us All =

Studio album by Chicks on Speed
- Released: 2000
- Genre: Electroclash
- Length: 43:32
- Label: Chicks on Speed Records

Chicks on Speed chronology
The Un-Releases (2000)	Chicks on Speed Will Save Us All (2000)	The Re-Releases of the Un-Releases (2000)

Professional ratings
Review scores
Source	Rating
AllMusic	4/5 stars
Pitchfork	7.3/10
Spin	8/10
The Village Voice	A−

Chicks on Speed Will Save Us All is an album released in 2000 by the then Munich-based artists Chicks on Speed (COS). The album is considered to epitomize the German electroclash movement, as well as Eurotrash culture.

== Album information ==
Although The Un-Releases was released first, Will Save Us All is considered to be COS' official debut album because the former's content included bits of sound collages, taped conversations and moments in-between takes (The Re-Releases Of The Un-Releases was released later in 2000). Will Save Us All included four of the five singles released by the group since 1998 and combined cover songs such as "Warm Leatherette" and "Mind Your Own Business" and original songs. COS' cover of Malaria!'s "Kaltes Klares Wasser" was a subsequent single. COS collaborated with a diverse range of producers and DJs from the German techno scene to create the album.

The album was well received by critics, who praised in particular the reinterpretations of various 80s songs and the strength of COS' original compositions such as "Glamour Girl" and "Little Star" and took note of the implications of the group's politics that were largely manifested through a deliberate emphasis on style over substance in terms of both music and image.

== Track listing ==
1. "Stop Records Advert"
2. "Give Me Back My Man" (The B-52s cover)
3. "For All The Boys In The World"
4. "Glamour Girl"
5. "Pedstang [Re]Issue"
6. "Little Star"
7. "Warm Leatherette" (Daniel Miller/The Normal cover)
8. "Kaltes Klares Wasser" (Malaria! cover)
9. "Yes I Do!"
10. "Procrastinator"
11. "Mind Your Own Business" (The Delta 5 cover)
12. "The Floating Pyramid Over Frankfurt That The Taxi Driver Saw When He Was Landing"
13. "Euro Trash Girl" (Cracker cover)

== Singles ==
- "Warm Leatherette"
- "Mind Your Own Business"
- "Euro Trash Girl"
- "Glamour Girl"
- "Kaltes Klares Wasser" (Released after the album)
