= Downtown (Peaches song) =

Single by Peaches

from the album Impeach My Bush
- Released: July 6, 2006
- Recorded: 2006
- Genre: Techno, electroclash
- Length: 3:34 (original); 6:22 (Simian Mobile Disco Remix)
- Label: XL
- Songwriter(s): Peaches
- Producer(s): Peaches, Greg Kurstin

Peaches singles chronology
"Shake Yer Dix" (2004)	"Downtown" (2006)	"Boys Wanna Be Her" (2006)

Music video
- "Downtown" on YouTube

"Downtown" is the first single from Peaches' third album Impeach My Bush. "Downtown" was the "Single of the Week" on XFM and chosen by NME as their choice single. The single is also Peaches' third to chart on the UK Singles Chart.

== Critical reception ==
NME described the song as "not an earth-stopping departure," when compared to her former songs but praised it for sounding "like a giant robot cat spewing up sound like an invitation to some kind of all-night New Orleans dwarf sex coke rave."

== Music video ==
The video for "Downtown" was made to promote the first single from Impeach My Bush. In the video Peaches plays two characters, a woman in a red dress (probably a sex worker) and a man. Both of them interact in the video. In the end Peaches the man seems dead or passed out while androgynous Peaches cleans her face in front of a mirror.

== Track listings ==
1. "Downtown" – 3:34
2. "Hanky Code" – 4:03
3. "Downtown" (Simian Mobile Disco Remix) – 6:22

== Song usage ==
"Downtown" was used in the video game The Sopranos: Road to Respect in 2006.

== Charts ==
Chart (2006)	Peak position
UK Singles Chart	50
UK Dance Singles Chart	5
UK Indie Singles Chart	8
