= Talk to Me (Peaches song) =

Single by Peaches

from the album I Feel Cream
- Released: April 27, 2009
- Genre: Electroclash ("Talk to Me"); Electronica ("More")
- Length: 3:05 (Talk to Me"); 4:32 ("More")
- Label: XL
- Songwriters: Peaches, Gonzales
- Producer: Soulwax

Peaches singles chronology
"Wild Thing (Peaches Remix)" (2007)	"Talk to Me" (2009)	"Lose You" (2009)

Music video
- "Talk to Me" on YouTube "More" on YouTube

"Talk to Me" is an electroclash song written by Peaches and her longtime collaborator and friend Gonzales, and produced by Soulwax. It is the first single from the album I Feel Cream. The song was released as part of a double A-side, along with the song "More".

== Critical reception ==
The song received mostly positive reviews from critics, praising Peaches' singing and versatility when compared to her previous work. Heather Phares of Allmusic wrote,"'Talk to Me' is a standout, with Soulwax providing an electro-soul backdrop for some of Peaches' most powerful singing." Likewise, Matthew Perpetua of Pitchfork Media described the song as "one of the best songs of Peaches' career to date, has her confronting problems with a partner head-on without pulling any punches, and singing her heart out with the aggrieved intensity of Tina Turner. Barry Walters of SPIN wrote that the song is "so tense and nasty it out-sexes her salacious rhymes elsewhere." Conversely, Darren Carle of The Skinny gave the song 2 out of 5 stars, commenting, "'Talk To Me' is a plea to a partner to open up, where once she would have rather shoved her crotch in their face."

== Chart performance ==
"Talk to Me" became Peaches' first single to chart on the Austrian Singles Chart. It debuted and peaked at #51 before falling to #73 in its second week.

== Music videos ==
=== Development ===
Price James directed the music video for "Talk to Me". Filming took place at the George Tavern in Whitechapel.

=== Synopsis ===
In the music video for "Talk to Me," Peaches is seen in an abandoned house wearing an outfit made out of faux human hair. Throughout the video various women appear and dance while wearing outrageously large wigs of various colors and styles. Hair starts to grow from the walls, out of paintings and out from under doors. The hair moves on its own throughout the house as more and more accumulates. While the hair is growing, the women in wigs dance and cavort with Peaches.

The video for "More" starts off with Peaches on a bike made out of balloons. Then she goes around in a place filled with balloon people and bright lights while she is popping and groping them.

=== Release and reception ===
The music video for "Talk to Me" premiered on XL's YouTube channel on April 10, 2009. That same day, it also premiered on Perez Hilton's website. The video for "More" premiered on XL's YouTube channel on April 29, 2009.

Kate Harper of Chart described "Talk to Me" as "Peaches' least raunchy video," that is "more scary than sexy." Matthew Richardson of Prefix Magazine commented that "Peaches has always been preoccupied with hair symbolism, but her message was way clearer when said hair was coming from her crotch."

== Live performances ==
On October 26, 2009, Peaches appeared on the French television show Canal+ Album de la Semaine and performed "Talk to Me".

On November 6, 2009, Peaches appeared on the Last Call with Carson Daly and performed "Talk to Me".

== Track listing ==
1. "Talk to Me" – 3:05
2. "More" – 4:32

== Charts ==
Chart (2009)	Peak position
Australia (ARIA)	101
Austrian Singles Chart	51
French Singles Chart	99

== Nominations ==
Year	Category	Genre	Recording	Result
UK Music Video Awards
2009	Best Styling	Music Video	"Talk to Me"	Nominated
