= Boys Wanna Be Her =

Single by Peaches

from the album Impeach My Bush
- Released: November 6, 2006
- Recorded: 2006
- Genre: Glam punk
- Length: 3:55 (album version); 3:57 (radio edit)
- Label: XL
- Songwriter: Peaches
- Producer: Peaches

Peaches singles chronology
"Downtown" (2006)	"Boys Wanna Be Her" (2006)	"Wild Thing (Peaches Remix)" (2007)

Music video
- "Boys Wanna Be Her" on YouTube

"Boys Wanna Be Her" is a song written and recorded by the Canadian artist Peaches, released as the second single from her third full-length album, Impeach My Bush.

== Track listing ==
1. "Boys Wanna Be Her" – 3:57
2. "Boys Wanna Be Her" (The Flaming Lips Eat Peaches) – 3:14
3. "Boys Wanna Be Her" (Tommy Sunshine's Brooklyn Fire Retouch) – 5:04
4. "Boys Wanna Be Her" (Weird Science Remix) – 3:53

== Music video ==
The music video shows Peaches and The Herms, all dressed in glam rock fashion, hitting themselves until they bleed while performing the song on stage.

== Uses in other media ==
"Boys Wanna Be Her" was featured in episodes of television series Ugly Betty ("Don't Ask, Don't Tell") and The L Word (featured on the L Tunes: Music from and inspired by The L Word compilation album).

The song is used in the Canadian supernatural TV show Lost Girl.

"Boys Wanna Be Her" was used in the promos for the FX network show Dirt and the Fox network show Dollhouse.

The Tommy Sunshine remix of the song is featured in the Electronic Arts video game Need For Speed: ProStreet.

The song is used in the Matchstick Productions ski film Push.

The song was featured in the trailer of the 2012 movie Bad Kids Go to Hell.

The song is featured in the 2009 movie Whip It and the movie's trailer. In addition, the song appears on the official Whip It soundtrack.

Part of the song was used in Canadian car television commercials for the 2011 Subaru Forester as part of the "Sexy Comes Standard" advertising campaign.

The song is used as the theme music for the TBS late-night TV series Full Frontal with Samantha Bee. Peaches also performed the song for the Not the White House Correspondents' Dinner.

Peaches performed the song on season 4, episode 7 of Orphan Black, "The Antisocialism of Sex."

The song is used in the trailer for the BBC series Fleabag.

The song is also included on the soundtrack to the 2016 film, How to Be Single.

In the UK, during the UEFA Women's Euro 2017, the song was used as part of Channel 4's coverage of the tournament, it featured a schoolgirl playing keepie uppie.

The song is featured in a 2017 ad for CoverGirl starring professional motorcycle racer Shelina Moreda.

In 2019, Christina Aguilera featured the song in her Las Vegas concert residency Christina Aguilera: The Xperience and also The X Tour, which comprised 15 shows in Europe.

Also in 2019, the song was used as part of UK channel Sky Atlantic's promotion of Catherine the Great.

In 2020, the song was featured on the season 2 finale of the Amazon Prime series The Boys, specifically the scene where Queen Maeve, Kimiko and Starlight/Annie January beat up the Nazi supe Stormfront.

In 2022, the song was featured during the end credits of The 355.

In 2024, the song was used as the entrance/exit music in Taylor Tomlinson's 3rd Netflix special, Have It All.

In 2024, the song appears in Episode 1 of Disney's documentary of female wildlife, Queens.

In 2025, the song was featured during the end credits of M3GAN 2.0.

In 2025, the song was featured in the final scene and end credits of the pilot episode of the HBO series I Love LA.

In 2026, the song was featured in the first scene of the final episode of season one of the Apple TV series Margo's Got Money Troubles.

== Other versions ==
"Boys Wanna Be Her (Tommie Sunshine's Brooklyn Fire Retouch)" appeared on the Ultra.Rock Remixed compilation album from Ultra Records in 2007.

The Weird Science remix of the song was included on the 2008 album Pillowface and His Airplane Chronicles by Steve Aoki.

== Live performances ==
On April 13, 2007, Peaches made her second appearance on The Henry Rollins Show and performed "Boys Wanna Be Her" and "Hit it Hard".

== Nominations ==
Year	Category	Genre	Recording	Result
MVPA Awards
2007	Best Make-up	Music Video	"Boys Wanna Be Her"	Nominated
