= Chicks on Speed =

Feminist music and fine art ensemble

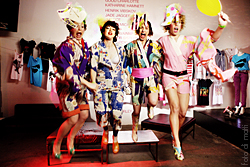
- Chicks on Speed in Berlin on 7 February 2008

Background information
- Origin: Munich, Germany
- Genres: Electroclash; electropop
- Years active: 1997–present
- Labels: Grönland; UniCAT; Chicks on Speed; K
- Members: Alex Murray-Leslie; Anat Ben David; Kathi Glas; Tina Frank; Unnur Andrea Einarsdóttir
- Past members: Melissa E. Logan; Kiki Moorse; Faustine Komplewjski; A.L. Steiner; Erica Lewis; Krõõt Juurak
- Website: www.chicksonspeed.com

Chicks on Speed is a feminist art music ensemble, formed in Munich, Germany, in 1997 at the Munich Academy of Fine Arts. Though Chicks on Speed reached cult status throughout the 2000s and became most well known as catalysts of the musical genre electroclash, the band performs as a multidisciplinary art group working in performance art, electronic dance music, collage graphics, textile design, fashion, musical instrument design, artistic research and art education.

== History ==
The co-founders, Alex Murray-Leslie and Melissa E. Logan met in 1997 as art students at the Academy of Fine Arts, Munich, while attending one of the academy's parties. Logan and Kiki Moorse met through their Japanese boyfriends. Moorse came from fashion, formally an editor at Condé Nast. Moorse was a performer in an early Chicks on Speed video (Für die Bessere Welt/ for the better world, Seppi welt ist besser/ (a member until 2006 now on Toffeetones Records).

In 1996, Murray-Leslie invited Logan and Moorse to join an illegal bar she founded named Seppi Bar. Logan and Murray-Leslie, along with co-art student Lisa Walker, began working as a group at Seppi Bar to create art exhibitions and host illegal parties. It was an art project based on the Cabaret Voltaire in Zürich where Dada artists met and performed.

After painting 25 collage paintings in one night to sell at the annual sale of paintings at the Art Academy, Murray-Leslie needed a collective name in order to be part of the sale, for which they coined the name Chicks on Speed.

In this period, Murray-Leslie worked with Upstart (Label owner of Disko B) at the techno nightclub Ultraschall working the door, curating live-art events and interior media art installations. Chicks on Speed created a live-art piece named I Wanna Be A DJ...Baby!. They stood behind DJ decks and smashed records while a sound collage tape was playing. For this project they also put together a "box set" with a T-shirt, a cassette, a paper record and a fake interview for their "band".

During this time they met Upstart (a.k.a. Peter Wacha) of Disko B record label who joined their freshly started record label, Go Records, which later become Chicks on Speed Records with Jeurgen Söder.

Go Records was a suicide label—the release numbers started at 10 and went down to zero; the motto was, perhaps what is wrong with the world is that things are made to grow & get bigger. The 10 releases were primarily limited edition 7" and 10" records that sold out fast.

== Philosophy ==
In an interview with Undertheradar, Melissa Logan, a founding and current member stated, "We are humanists. Feminism is a small and at the same time a great part of this. Besides the obvious deserved rights for females through sexual equality, equality offers white males a way out of the white male oppressor role." Logan states that their political activism is a form of feminism and that their form of feminism does not have to fit into a box. She asserts, "We were confused and aggressive: what do you mean, we’re feminists? We’re just making our work. And then, at the time, I had a really political boyfriend, who said, yes, you guys are really political, if you’re not feminists you can’t do what you want to do. It doesn’t mean that there’s a definition and you have to fit with it – you can make your own definition of it – and then it was oh yeah."

== Music ==
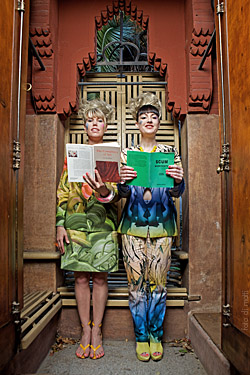
Alex Murray-Leslie and Melissa Logan, portrayed in a Gaudi building in Barcelona in 2009

A cassette titled Analog Internet was the first piece of music released by Chicks On Speed. The cassette was released in 1997, though it seems widely agreed that the first Chicks on Speed single was a cover of the song "Warm Leatherette", originally by Daniel Miller (as The Normal), released in 7" form. The single was released in 1998 and four further singles ("Smash Metal", "Euro Trash Girl" (originally by Cracker in 1993), "Mind Your Own Business" (originally by Delta 5 in 1979) and "Glamour Girl" over 1998 and 1999) preceded any actual album releases. In March 2000, two Chicks on Speed LPs were released; the first, titled The Un-Releases, is not considered an official album, instead described as a "collage" of various songs in various forms. Chicks on Speed's debut, Chicks On Speed Will Save Us All appeared later in the month and featured all five of the previous singles as well as a new one, "Kaltes Klares Wasser", a cover of a song by the German all-women punk band Malaria!. All six of these singles proved popular and in October 2000, The Re-Releases Of The Un-Releases was issued.

Several EPs were issued over the next few years such as chix 52, a collection of B-52's covers and Fashion Rules that heralded the arrival of the 2003 second album 99 Cents released on Chicks on Speed records and licensed to EMI. The album produced three more singles: "We Don't Play Guitars", a collaboration with Canadian artist Peaches, which was a hit around the world; a cover of Tom Tom Club's "Wordy Rappinghood" which saw a number of guest stars including Le Tigre; and "Flame On", a hidden track on the album with Mika Vainio. By this time Chicks on Speed have already been collaborating with Anat Ben-David, an unofficial band member working with them since 2002.

In 2004, their third album, Press The Spacebar was released. The album was a collaboration with the Spanish band The No-Heads and Cristian Vogel. No singles were issued from the album, though it included a new version of "Culture Vulture", a song from their previous LP release 99 Cents.

In November 2006, Chicks on Speed released the 12" single "Art Rules" produced with Christopher Just, with guests Anat Ben David and Turner prize artist Douglas Gordon; after the release, Chicks on Speed concentrated on live art performances under the same name and toured art institutions the world over, collaborating with A.L. Steiner, Anat Ben David, Kathi Glas and Adi Nachman.

Chicks on Speed began researching and developing ObjektInstruments (self-made musical instruments) in 2005 for studio and stage implementation, and held a solo exhibition presenting the instruments in a performative installation at Dundee Contemporary Arts Centre in 2010.

2011–2013 Chicks on Speed were Artist Residents at ZKM, Centre for Art and Media, Karlsruhe producing the new Chicks on Speed album UTOPIA and a series of 6 APP's as musical instruments for interactive stage performances. Chicks on Speed collaborated with Julian Assange, Yoko Ono, Peter Weible and Francesca Thyssen, Anat Ben David, Angie Seah, Oliver Horton and Christopher Just on the album UTOPIA released September 2014.

== Other artistic endeavours ==
Chicks on Speed's work is not limited to one specific genre, but rather encompasses various forms of creative expression, resulting in a unique and diverse body of work. They ran a record label, Chicks On Speed Records, together with Peter Wacha, Juergen Söder and Gero Loferer (design), releasing recordings by Le Tigre, Kevin Blechdom, Planningtorock, Gustav, Ana da Silva of The Raincoats, DAT Politics, Susanne Brokesch, Kids on TV, Anat Ben-David, Angie Reed and the Girl Monster compilation series curated by Murray-Leslie.

Chicks on Speed's interest lies in art, something that also characterizes their live performances. Major solo art exhibitions include "Synthesize" touring exhibition in 2024-28 starting at The Espai d' Art Contemporani de Castelló (EACC)(Contemporary Art Space of Castellón) 2024, ArtSpace Sydney 2013, Institute of Modern Art, Brisbane 2013 and Design Hub RMIT University, Melbourne, 2014, Dundee Contemporary Arts 2011, Kunstraum Kreuzberg 2010, CAC Vilnius 2007, Kunstverein Wolfsburg 2004 and Kunstraum Innsbruck 2005.

Group exhibitions include "Kiss Kiss Bang Bang", Bilbao Fine Arts Museum 2007 and "Switch On the Power", Vigo, Spain 2006, XMas, Sell-Out, and ChicksTV. Chicks on Speed performed at the Australian Pavilion vernisage, the 55th Venice Biennale and Museum of Contemporary Art Sydney, 2013, Thyssen Bornemisza Art Contemporary 2012, Turner Prize Retrospective at the Tate in October 2007, and at MoMA in June 2006, as part of a special evening with Douglas Gordon. Their work with Douglas Gordon included a performance at the Centre Georges Pompidou in February 2007, Collection TBA-21 hosted a performance in Vienna in April 2007, and an exhibition at Yvonne Lambert in Paris in September 2007.

They have been responsible for the cover art for various other artists, particularly ones signed to their label and Mego Records in Vienna.

Chicks on Speed's focus on fashion began in 1997 with their first stage costumes; these developed into a longtime collaboration with Kathi Glas, and more recently with Peggy Noland, Ari Fish and Jeremy Scott. The fashion side of Chicks on Speed has grown into collaborations with independent fashion brands, including textile yardages for Crystal Ball Japan in 2007/2008, DAA (Designers Against Aids) and Hennes and Mauritz "Fashion Against Aids" in 2008. In 2009, Chicks on Speed and Insight launched the project, Insight on Chicks on Speed, with a range of girls' surf wear, and a song and video, titled "Super Surfer Girl". They are currently working on a larger collaboration with another larger brand.

Logan and Murray-Leslie published 2 books with Booth-Clibborn Editions: Chicks on Speed: It's A Project 2005 containing historical pieces of information about the band and their art from their beginning stages onward, including a dress, a DIY pattern to make overalls, designed by Chicks on Speed and Jeremy Scott, a CD of unreleased music and a poster, all together in a tote bag designed by Chicks on Speed. "Chicks on Speed Don't Art, Fashion, Music 2011".

Chicks on Speed's series of what they call ObjectInstruments sees the group shy away from filling the stage with conventional band instruments, they invented their own instruments, which at times double as fashionable stage outfits –for example: Super suits, outfits which remotely trigger audio/video, and an haute couture hat which is a self-contained amplification device.

The 2010 exhibition "Chicks on Speed Don't, Art, fashion, Music" at Dundee Contemporary Arts Centre was their first major solo exhibition in the UK. Chicks on Speed opened with a live art performance for invited guests, featuring the 'e-shoe' – the world's first wireless high-heeled shoe guitar, made in collaboration with Milan-based shoe designer Max Kibardin and Hangar.org. These shoes were unveiled alongside Chicks on Speed's self made ‘objektinstruments’ – A Theremin Tapestry, cigar-box synthesizers, super suits with sewn-in body sensors that trigger audio/video samples and two hats made in collaboration with Christophe Coppins and Hangar.org, based on illuminated drawings of Hildegard von Bingen, a 12th-century Christian mystic. These hats transmit the utterances of their wearers by way of microphones and speakers.

The DCA galleries were further transformed into a giant stage and studio set for making music videos, experimenting with no-choreography and ongoing craft projects live, including loom-weaving inspired by Bauhaus design, lectures and workshops, film screenings of their fashion archive and selected video pieces. Chicks on Speed worked with local and international makers to combine traditional craft with digital technology.

In 2013 & 2014, Chicks on Speed toured their major solo interactive multimedia exhibition SCREAM to global cultural institutions: ArtSpace, Sydney, RMIT Design Hub Melbourne, Fremantle Arts Centre, Perth, Institute of Modern Art, Brisbane and Institute of Contemporary Art, Singapore.

== Current members ==
- Alex Murray-Leslie (Bowral, New South Wales, Australia)
- Anat Ben David (London, UK/Israel)
- Kathi Glas (Berlin, Germany)
- Tina Frank (Vienna, Austria)
- Unnur Andrea Einarsdóttir (Reykjavík, Iceland)

== Discography ==
=== Albums ===
- The Un-Releases (1999)
- Chicks on Speed Will Save Us All (2000)
- The Re-Releases of the Un-Releases (2001)
- 99 Cents (2003)
- Press the Spacebar (with the No Heads) (2004)
- Cutting The Edge (2009)
- Artstravaganza (2014)
- HEARandNOWtopia (2025)

=== EPs and singles ===
- "Warm Leatherette" (with DJ Hell) (1997)
- "Euro Trash Girl" (with Mäuse) (1998)
- "Smash Metal" (with DMX Krew) (1999)
- "Mind Your Own Business" (with Pulsinger, Gaier/Reents) (1999)
- "Glamour Girl" (1999)
- "Kaltes Klares Wasser" (2000)
- "Split 7" with V/VM" (2000)
- "Chix 52" (2000)
- "The Chicks on Speed / Kreidler Sessions" (with Kreidler) (2001)
- "Fashion Rules" (2002)
- "We Don't Play Guitars" (2003)
- "Wordy Rappinghood" (2003) – UK 66
- "Flame On" (with Mika Vainio) (2004)
- "What Was Her Name?" (2004) (Dave Clarke featuring Chicks on Speed) – UK #50
- "Art Rules" (2007)
- "Super Surfer Girl" (2008)
- "10 Years Thyssen Bornemisza Art Contemporary 21-Art Dump" (2012)
- UTOPIA (2014)
- "We Are Data" (remix) Cora Nova (2017)
- "Vaccinate Me Baby" (2021)
- "Arctic Rabbit" (2022)
- "Uploading the Human" (2023)
- "Synthesize" (2024)
