= Caroline Sascha Cogez =

Danish-French director/writer

- Born: Caroline Sascha Cogez; Paris, France
- Occupations: Director, writer
- Years active: 1998 – present
- Notable work: She Sings, Show Stopper
- Awards: Jury's Special Award, Cinema Varite (Iran); Robert Awards 2015 (Denmark)

Caroline Sascha Cogez is a Danish-French director/writer whose short films include fiction, documentary, commercials and music promos. Cogez is educated from the Danish independent film school super16 and she has studied sociology at Roskilde University.

Cogez film She Sings (2011) received the Jury's Special Award at Cinema Varite in Iran. Her movie Lulu (2014) won the 2015 Robert Awards in Denmark.

== Filmography ==
=== Writer and director ===
Cogez has both written and directed most of her films, short films and documentaries.

Year	Title	Notes
2001	Hi, my name is Candy	18-minute short
2003	Bus	Short fiction
2004	Mellem rum	Short fiction
2005	Les amours perdus	Short fiction
2006	Emmalou	Short fiction
2008	The Present	
2009	Show Stopper	
2011	She Sings	Documentary
2013	The Working Life	Director only. Short documentary for Superflex.
2014	Lulu	Short fiction

=== Other works and appearances ===
Cogez has worked on and appeared in several other films, notably Dancer in the Dark (2000) and Dogville (2003), in which she was an assistant director.

Glasgow Short Film Festival made a retrospective on Cogez in 2013.

== Sources and external links ==
- Caroline Sascha Cogez at IMDb
- Caroline Sascha Cogez at U Itch I Scratch
- Caroline Sascha Cogez on Vimeo
- Super16 homepage
