= Peaches (musician) =

Canadian musician (born 1966)

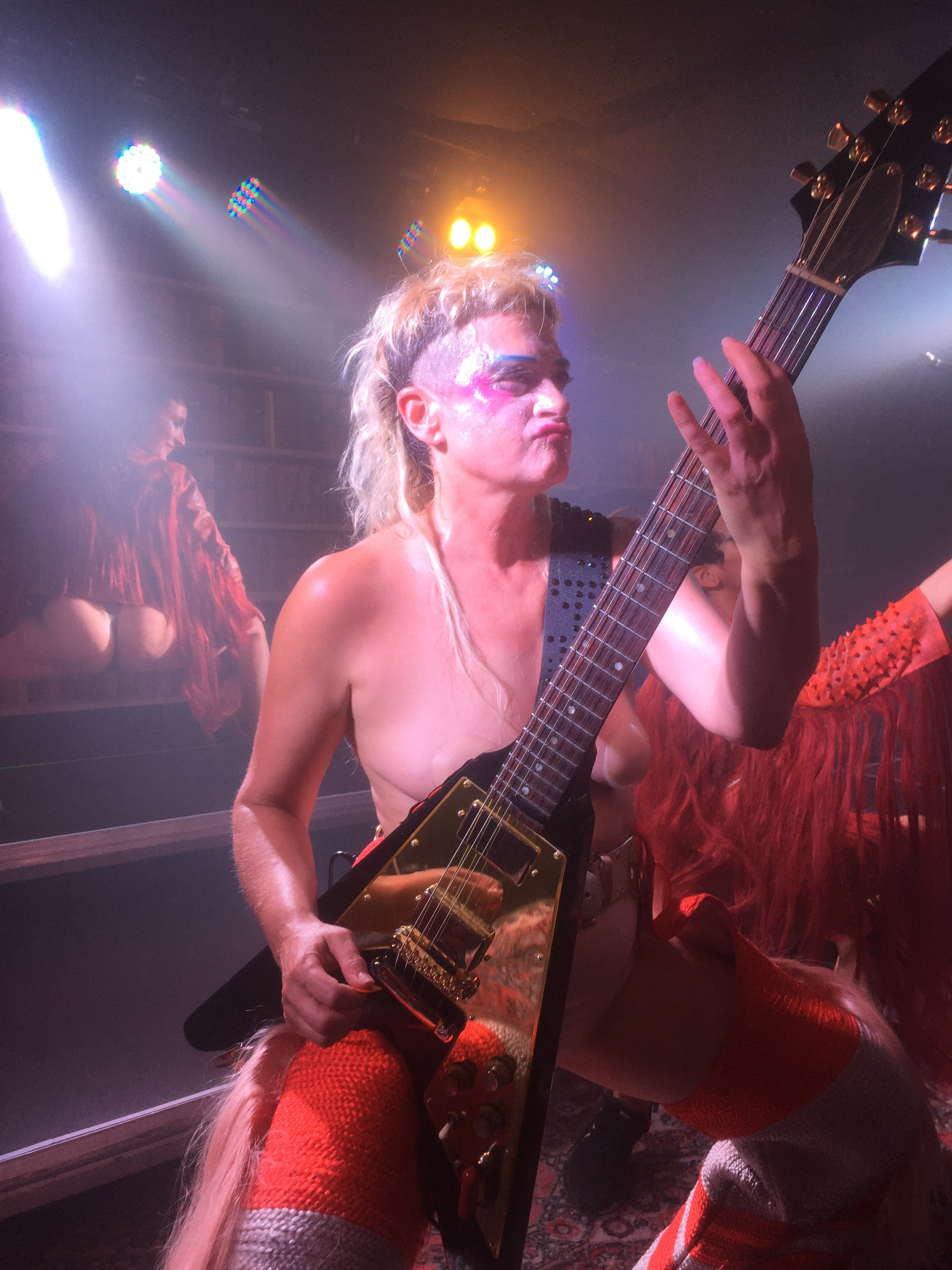
- Peaches performing in Wellington, February 2023

Background information
- Born: Merrill Nisker; 11 November 1966 (age 60); Toronto, Ontario, Canada
- Genres: Electroclash; electropunk; dance-punk; punk rock; alternative hip-hop; synth-pop; alternative dance
- Occupations: Rapper; singer; producer
- Years active: 1990–present
- Labels: Kill Rock Stars; XL; Kitty-Yo; Teenage USA
- Website: teachesofpeaches.com

Merrill Nisker (born 11 November 1966), also known by the stage name Peaches, is a Canadian electroclash musician and producer.

Peaches has been described as a "feminist and queer icon" by Variety.

== Early life ==
Merrill Nisker was born in 1966 in Toronto, Ontario. Her family was culturally Jewish, though not religious. Her maternal grandparents immigrated to Canada from Ustrzyki Dolne in Poland. Her paternal grandparents were from Galicia (western Ukraine).

Growing up, she experienced antisemitism from students at a nearby Catholic school who would throw stones at her and call her a "dirty Jew".

As a teenager, Nisker appeared in two plays alongside future Barenaked Ladies singer Steven Page, including a musical, My Brother's Keeper.

Before becoming a full-time musician, Nisker worked as a teacher.

== Career ==
=== 1990–1999: Mermaid Cafe, Fancypants Hoodlum, The Shit ===
During the early 1990s, Nisker was part of a folk trio called Mermaid Cafe. The name was taken from the Joni Mitchell song "Carey."

In 1995, Nisker released her first solo album, Fancypants Hoodlum. Later that year, she joined The Shit, a four-piece band with Jason Beck (a.k.a. Chilly Gonzales), bassist Sticky Henderson (later of Weeping Tile and Music Maul), and Dominic Salole (a.k.a. Mocky). Every member of the band had a moniker and Nisker's was Peaches, inspired by Nina Simone's song "Four Women" in which Simone screams at the end, "My name is Peaches!"

In Toronto, she lived above the sex shop Come as You Are with her roommate, Feist. Feist sang backup at Peaches' shows, using a sock puppet and adopted the stage name "Bitch Lap Lap." The two toured together in England from 2000 to 2001, staying with Justine Frischmann of Elastica and M.I.A. M.I.A. went on to video-document Peaches' 2000 US tour and made clothes for the musician, while Peaches inspired M.I.A. to use the Roland MC-505 in her own compositions.

=== 2000–2002: The Teaches of Peaches ===
After creating a six track EP, Lovertits, Peaches moved to Berlin, Germany, where she was signed by the Kitty-Yo label. The label offered her the chance to record a new album, The Teaches of Peaches, back in her hometown of Toronto, and the already-completed Lovertits EP was released in the summer of 2000. The full-length album The Teaches of Peaches was released that fall. The album contains her signature song "Fuck the Pain Away".

Peaches appeared on the British TV show Top of the Pops, but her performance was not aired.

Nisker signed a European contract with Sony following the release of The Teaches of Peaches. She later made a music video for the song "Set It Off" in which she sat in a locker room as her pubic and armpit hair grew to Rapunzel length. Sony subsequently dropped her.

In 2001, Nisker's bust was one of the first female busts cast by famous 1960s groupie Cynthia Plaster Caster, who was better known for making molds of male rockers' genitalia.

In 2002, Peaches appeared in "Hideous Man", a short film directed by John Malkovich. The short film was created as a showcase for clothing designed by Bella Freud and featured poetry from Gary Sinise.

=== 2003–2005: Fatherfucker ===
In 2003, Peaches released her second album Fatherfucker on XL/Kitty-Yo after years of touring and opening for artists like Marilyn Manson and Queens of the Stone Age. She wrote and programmed all of the album's music herself. The single "Kick It", which features Iggy Pop, was described by Peaches to Rolling Stone as "more about rock 'n' roll than sex."

For her album Fatherfucker, Peaches was nominated in the "Outstanding Music Artist" category for the 15th GLAAD Media Awards.

=== 2006–2008: Impeach My Bush ===
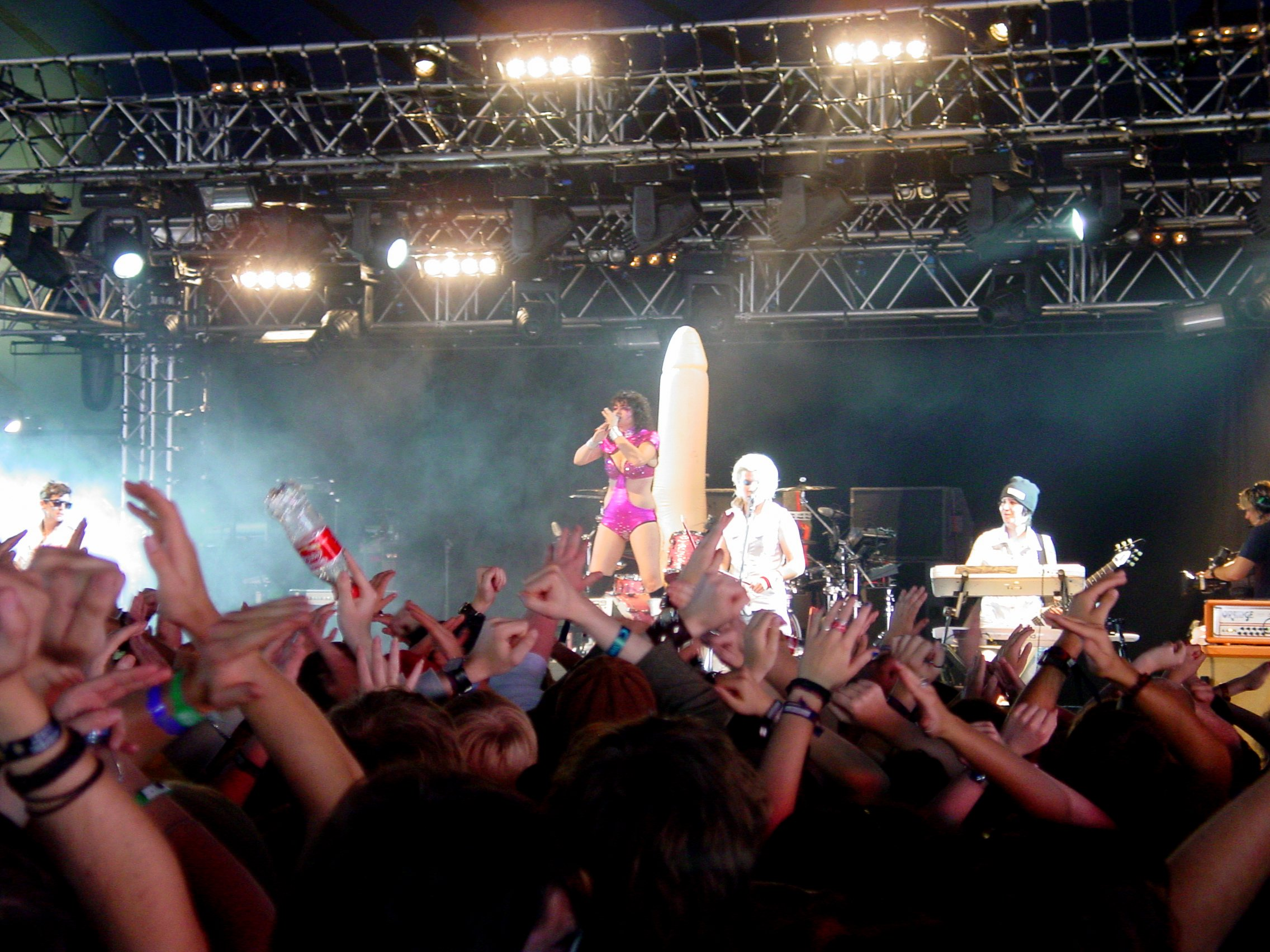
Peaches onstage in 2006

Peaches was nominated for her album Impeach My Bush in the category of "Outstanding Music Artist" at the 18th GLAAD Media Awards.

Peaches' song "Boys Wanna Be Her" is featured in an online teaser for the live-action feature film Bad Kids Go to Hell (2012). It also serves as the theme music for the late-night television series Full Frontal with Samantha Bee. It was featured as well in an episode of Orphan Black.

=== 2009–2012: I Feel Cream and other work ===
Peaches' fourth album, I Feel Cream, was released on the 4th of May 2009 in Europe and the 5th of May in North America. The first single from the album is a double A-side of "Talk to Me" and "More". Peaches enlisted some of her contemporaries to co-produce a number of tracks, including Simian Mobile Disco, Soulwax, Digitalism, and Shapemod. Long time collaborator Chilly Gonzales co-wrote some of the songs on I Feel Cream and Shunda K (the voice of Yo Majesty) sang on the track "Billionaire."

In 2010, Peaches and backing band, Sweet Machine, toured Australia performing at the sold out Big Day Out (BDO) festivals and at a series of sideshows, with Shunda K as her support.

On 14 March 2010, Peaches won the "Electronic Artist of the Year" award at the 10th Annual Independent Music Awards held in Toronto, Canada.

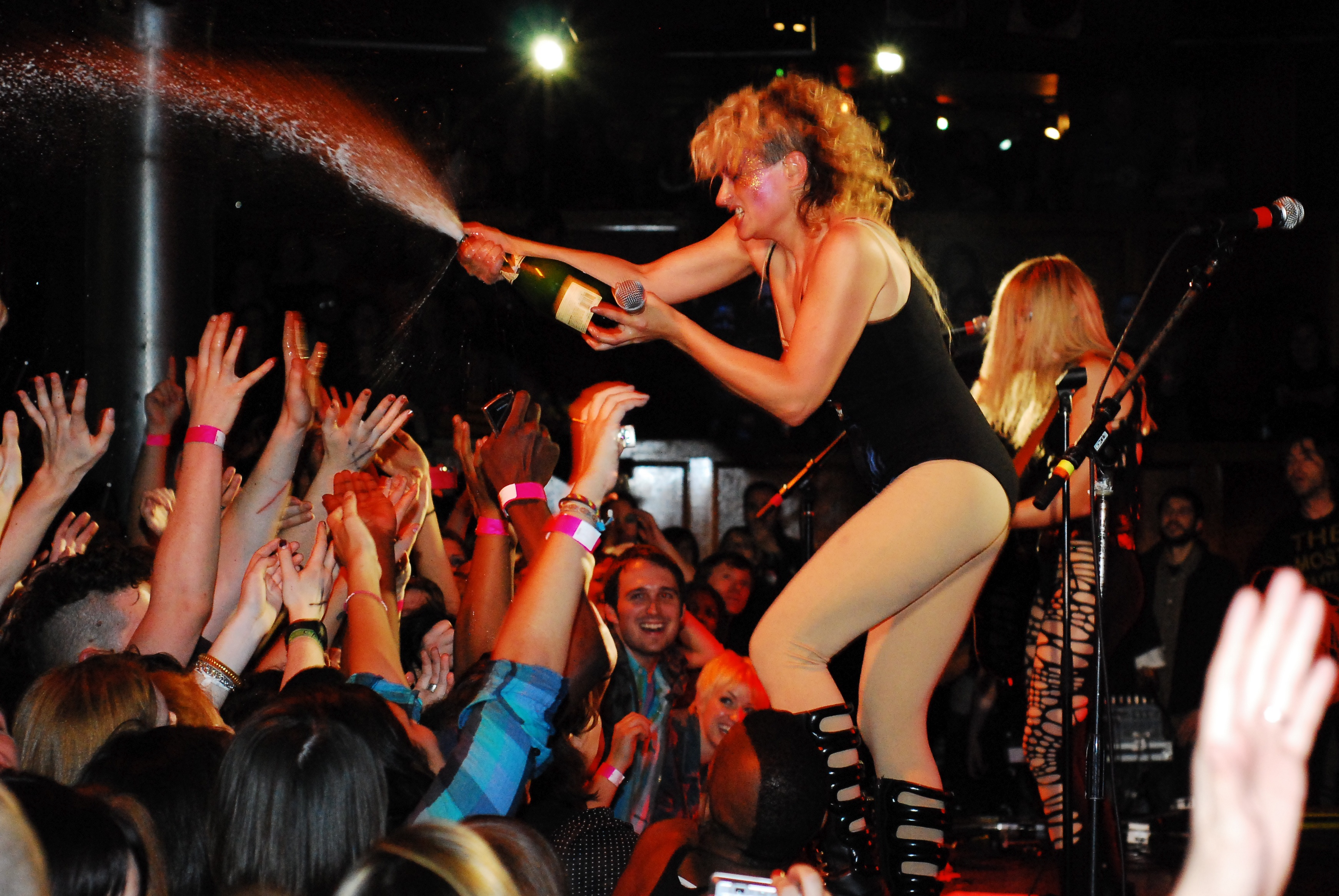
Peaches performing in 2009

In March 2010, Peaches performed a one-woman version of Jesus Christ Superstar at Berlin's HAU1. Gonzales accompanied Peaches on piano during the shows. Travis Jeppesen stated in his review for Artforum, "Not only did Peaches set it off, she managed to surprise us all by showing off an expansive vocal range, a musician's natural sensitivity to the dynamics of Andrew Lloyd Webber's score, and an emotive prowess that is rarely if ever displayed in her own, less holy, music."

In May 2010, Christina Aguilera announced that Peaches was among the collaborators on her fourth studio album, Bionic. Peaches is featured on a track called "My Girls". The song was co-written and produced by Le Tigre.

Peaches appeared in a film called Ivory Tower, directed by Adam Traynor and produced by Nicolas Kazarnia. Ivory Tower was given a limited theatrical release in August 2010.

On 30 August 2010, Peaches released a single titled "Johnny", part of a tribute series to Alan Vega of Suicide. Other musicians who have released tribute singles as part of the series include The Horrors, Primal Scream, Klaxons, and Bruce Springsteen.

Peaches also appeared as a guest musician on R.E.M.'s 2011 release Collapse into Now, contributing vocals to the song "Alligator_Aviator_Autopilot_Antimatter".

In 2019, Peaches premiered the large-scale stage production There’s Only One Peach with the Hole in the Middle at Kampnagel in Hamburg, featuring an ensemble of 12 musicians and dancers. The core touring band was led by musical director Tif Lamson and included Maya Postepski, Lizzy Scharnofske, and Sky Deep. MIDI musical direction for the show was provided by Postepski and Sky Deep.

=== 2015–2021: What Else Is in the Teaches of Peaches and Rub ===
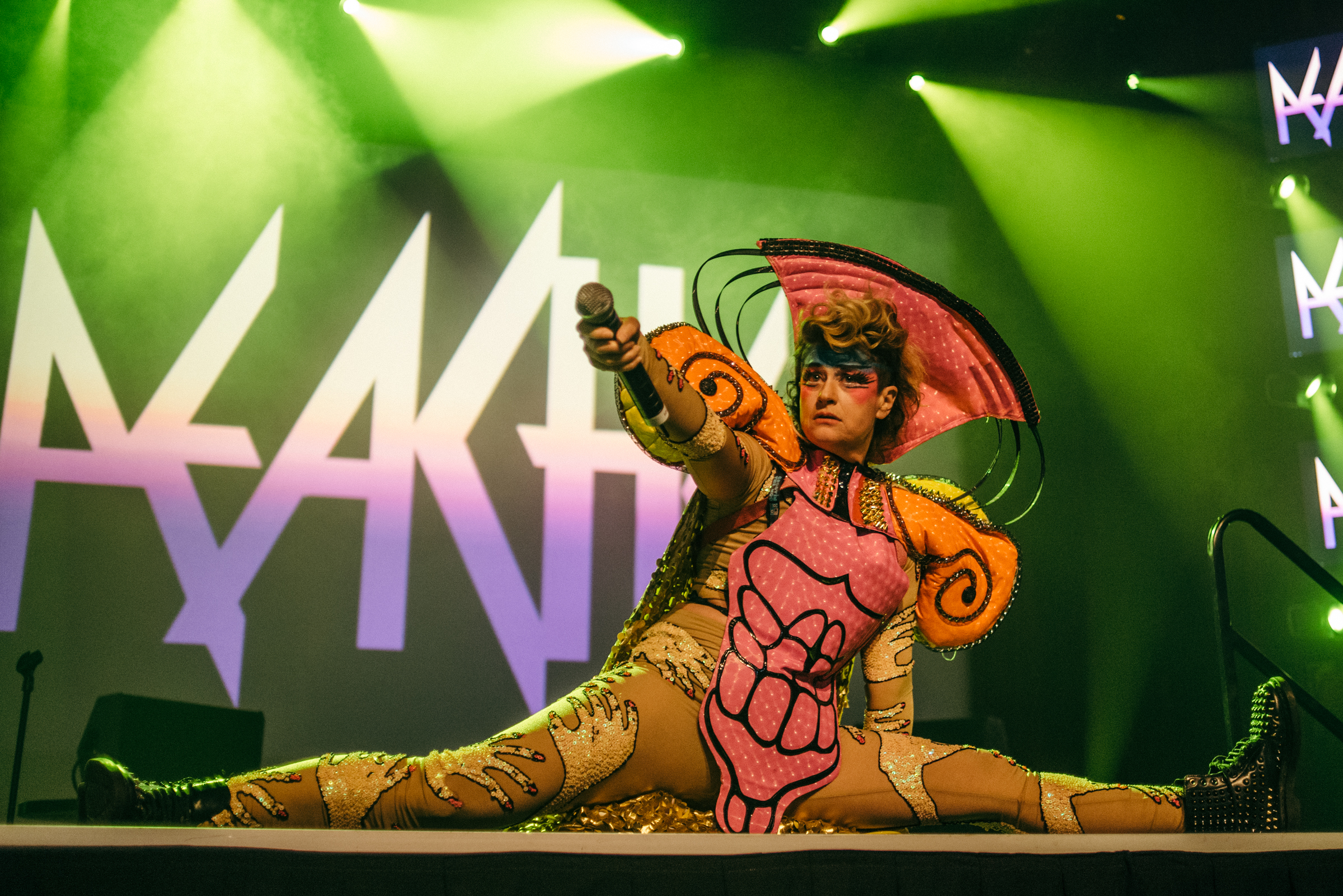
Peaches performing in 2016

Photographer Holger Talinski collaborated with Peaches on a book of photographs, What Else Is in the Teaches of Peaches, released on 2 June 2015. The book, published by Akashic Books, also includes text written by Peaches, R.E.M. lead singer Michael Stipe, artist and singer Yoko Ono, and actor Elliot Page.

Peaches' sixth studio album, Rub, was released on 25 September 2015. It was produced by Vice Cooler with Peaches in her Los Angeles garage. In June 2015, it was announced to contain guest vocal appearances by Kim Gordon, Feist, and Simonne Jones.

An unused track from the Rub sessions titled "Bodyline" was released by Adult Swim on 20 July 2015. The Vice Cooler-produced track features Nick Zinner on guitar and was described as "a heavy, chugging guitar line over which Peaches half raps, half sings a high-octane space jam." In May 2016, Peaches appeared in a fourth-season episode of the Canadian TV series Orphan Black as herself, performing "Bodyline" in a club. She performed "Boys Wanna Be Her" at the Not the White House Correspondents' Dinner on 29 April 2017. In February 2019, Peaches made her debut with the Staatstheater Stuttgart, co-directing and performing as Anna I in Kurt Weill's/Bertolt Brecht's Die sieben Todsünden.

=== 2022: Documentaries ===
In 2022, Peaches went on tour to mark the 20th anniversary of The Teaches of Peaches. The tour was profiled in the documentary film Teaches of Peaches, which premiered at the 74th Berlin International Film Festival. In the same year, she was the subject of Marie Losier's documentary Peaches Goes Bananas. Peaches described the two films as very different from each other, stating that "one is more of a documentary of a certain album at a certain place in time, [whereas] Marie’s film – well, I don’t even consider it documentary. It’s more of a painting, a portrait. Marie gets excited about an artist and then goes her own way."

Peaches' song "Boys Wanna Be Her" is featured in the 2022 film The 355.

=== 2025: Featured artist on In the Garden ===
In March 2025, it was announced that Peaches is featured on In the Garden, a concept album and musical by the artist Boyfriend.

=== 2026: No Lube So Rude ===
On February 20, 2026, Peaches' seventh studio album, titled No Lube So Rude, was released. The album was shortlisted for the 2026 Polaris Music Prize.

== Personal life ==
Peaches is bisexual.

In 1999, prior to recording her debut album, she was diagnosed with thyroid cancer, which was treated with surgery.

Peaches lists John Waters, Cindy Sherman, Paul McCarthy, and the films Tron, Grease, Liquid Sky, and Phantom of the Paradise as inspiration for the visuals in her live shows.

== Art ==
Peaches opened her first institutional solo art exhibition, "Whose Jizz Is This?" at the Kunstverein in Hamburg on 10 August 2019 (through 20 October 2019).

== Themes ==
Gender identity is one theme of Peaches' music, often playing with traditional notions of gender roles representation. Her lyrics and live shows consciously blur the distinction between male and female; for example, she appears on the cover of her album Fatherfucker with a full beard. When asked if she had chosen the title for shock value, she commented:

Motherfucker's so over. You call everybody a motherfucker – you call your mother a motherfucker. It's a pretty extreme and intense word. Instead of shying away from that, I thought I'd bring the fact that we're using the word motherfucker in a really mainstream way to the fore.

She disputes accusations of "penis envy", preferring the term "hermaphrodite envy", since "there is so much male and female in us all."

Age is another theme of Peaches' music. The lyrics from several songs from her 2009 album I Feel Cream tackle the issue of age, including "Trick or Treat" ("you lick my crow's feet"), "Show Stopper" ("Never mind my age, it's like we're breaking out of a cage"), and "Mommy Complex". Peaches has criticized ageism directed against her, telling the New York Daily News that "I'm going to make aging cool."

Nisker has criticized the "censorship" of pro-Palestinian progressive Jews in Germany. She believes that many Germans "can't separate Israeli politics from Jewish feelings" and that diverse Jewish opinions on the Israeli–Palestinian conflict are not "honored" in Germany, telling The New York Times that "for any progressive Jewish person who is thinking about what is going on, and understanding the history of what is going on, to be called antisemitic — by Germans — is ridiculous. Never did I think in 2024 that I would be thinking about that."

== Discography ==
=== Albums ===
- Fancypants Hoodlum (Note: As Merrill Nisker) (1995)
- The Teaches of Peaches (2000)
- Fatherfucker (2003)
- Impeach My Bush (2006)
- I Feel Cream (2009)
- Rub (2015)
- No Lube So Rude (2026)

== Filmography ==
=== Film ===
Year	Title	Role	Notes
2001	Chromezone XXX	Herself	Super-8 bike porn that Peaches directed and starred in
2002	Hideous Man	Beat Poet	Part of ensemble for short film collaboration with John Malkovich and Bella Freud
2009	Life on the Road with Mr. and Mrs. Brown	Herself	Documentary film about James Brown and Tomi Rae Brown
2010	Ivory Tower	Marsha Thirteen	Plays performance artist in collaboration with Gonzales, Feist and Tiga
2026	Antidiva: The Carole Pope Confessions	Self	Documentary about Carole Pope; also executive producer

=== Biopic musicals/documentaries ===
Year	Title	Director	Country	Notes
2012	Peaches Does Herself	Peaches	Germany	
2024	Peaches Goes Bananas	Marie Losier	France/Belgium	Premiered at the 81st Venice International Film Festival.
2024	Teaches of Peaches	Philipp Fussenegger and Judy Landkammer	Germany	Filmed during the 2022 concert tour marking the 20th anniversary of her breakthrough album The Teaches of Peaches. Premiered at the 74th Berlin International Film Festival, winning a Teddy Award for Best LGBTQ Documentary.

=== Television appearances ===
Year	Title	Role	Notes
2001	SexTV	Herself	1 episode
2004	Clash of Cultures	Herself	TV documentary about the electroclash music scene
2004	Sex 'n' Pop	Herself	1 episode, TV mini-series
2004	Durch die Nacht mit ...	Herself	1 episode alongside Heike Makatsch and Marilyn Manson, TV documentary series
2005	The L Word	Herself	1 episode
2006	Current TV	Herself	Episodes unknown
2006	Flight of the Conchords: A Texan Odyssey	Herself	TV documentary aired in New Zealand
2006–2007	The Henry Rollins Show	Herself	2 episodes in 2006 and 2007
2008	What Perez Sez	Herself	1 episode
2008	Nightline	Herself	Interview
2009	Last Call with Carson Daly	Herself	2 episodes
2009	House of Venus Show	Herself	1 episode
2009	Canal+ Album de la Semaine	Herself	1 episode
2010	Q TV	Herself	1 episode
2010	Subterranean	Herself	Host for 1 episode
2016	Orphan Black	Herself	1 episode

== Awards and nominations ==
Year	Awards	Category	Recording	Result
2006	Best Art Vinyl	Best Vinyl Art	Impeach My Bush	Nominated
2007	MVPA Awards	Best Make-up	"Boys Wanna Be Her"	Nominated
2009	UK Music Video Awards	Best Styling	"Talk to Me"	Nominated
2010	International Dance Music Awards	Best Electro Dance Track	"Talk to Me"	Nominated
2015	Polaris Music Prize	Heritage Award	The Teaches of Peaches	Won
2016	Polaris Music Prize	Album of the Year (Longlist)	Rub	Nominated
2016	A2IM Libera Awards	Video of the Year	"Dick in the Air"	Nominated
2026	Berlin Music Video Awards	Best Director	"No Lube So Rude"	Nominated
2026	Polaris Music Prize	Album of the Year	No Lube So Rude	Nominated

== See also ==
- List of electroclash bands and artists
