= Feist discography =

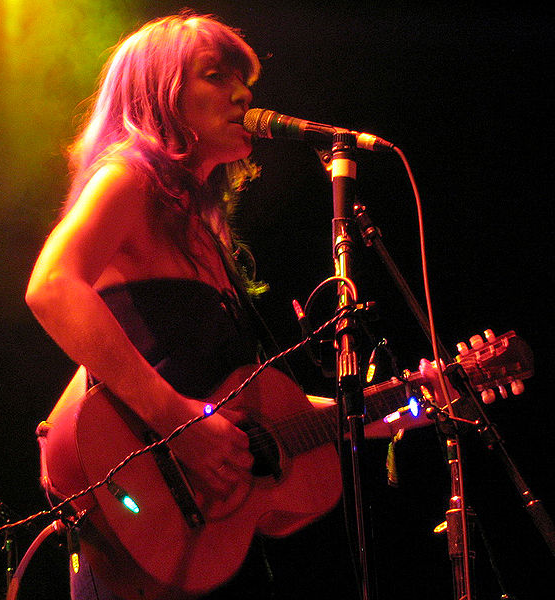
- Feist performing in 2006
- Studio albums: 6
- Singles: 10
- Collaborations: 5
- Remix albums: 1

The discography of Feist, a Canadian singer-songwriter, consists of six studio albums, eight singles and a remix album as well as four releases with Broken Social Scene.

Feist spent much of her early career collaborating with various bands and artists, such as By Divine Right, who she toured with for three years. In 1999 she released her first solo album, Monarch (Lay Your Jewelled Head Down), though the record didn't receive the attention of her later works. 2001 saw her work with Kevin Drew and Brendan Canning on Feel Good Lost, the first album by Broken Social Scene. Feist would go on to appear on every one of the band's albums, and toured intermittently with them until 2005.

Her second solo album, Let It Die, brought Feist to an international audience, charting in multiple countries whilst garnering three nominations at the 2005 Juno Awards with wins for Best Alternative Album and Best New Artist. The record has since gone platinum in Canada. In 2006, she released Open Season, a remix album of Let It Die featuring collaborations with various artists. Her third studio album, The Reminder, which was released in 2007, proved to be her most successful yet. The album charted at number 16 on the Billboard 200 and would go on to win the Shortlist Music Prize. The second single, "1234", was also a worldwide hit after being featured in an advertisement for the third-generation iPod Nano.

== Albums ==
=== Studio albums ===
Title	Album details	Peak chart positions										Certifications
Title	Album details	CAN	AUS	AUT	FRA	GER	IRE	SWE	SWI	UK	US	Certifications
Monarch (Lay Your Jewelled Head Down)	Released: September 1999; Label: Bobby Dazzler	—	—	—	—	—	—	—	—	—	—	
Let It Die	Released: May 18, 2004; Label: Arts & Crafts	—	—	51	38	92	—	—	—	121	— (Note: Let It Die did not enter the US Billboard 200, but peaked at number 36 on the US Heatseekers Albums Chart.)	MC: Platinum; BPI: Silver; SNEP: Gold
The Reminder	Released: April 13, 2007; Label: Cherrytree	2	46	4	8	11	61	8	12	28	16	MC: 2× Platinum; ARIA: Gold; BPI: Gold; RIAA: Gold; SNEP: Gold
Metals	Released: October 4, 2011; Label: Cherrytree/Interscope (US), Polydor (UK)	2	17	11	9	6	27	18	9	28	7	MC: Platinum
Pleasure	Release: April 28, 2017; Label: Universal	7	69	13	52	12	41	—	13	48	91	
Multitudes	Released: April 14, 2023; Label: Polydor	96	—	57	85	22	—	—	18	— (Note: Multitudes did not enter the UK, but peaked at number 26 on the UK Album Downloads Chart Chart.)	— (Note: Multitudes did not enter the US Billboard 200, but peaked at number 43 on the Top Album Sales Chart.)	
"—" denotes releases that did not chart

=== Remix albums ===
Title	Album details
Open Season	Released: May 16, 2006; Label: Arts & Crafts

=== Video albums ===
Title	Video details
Look at What the Light Did Now	Released: December 7, 2010; Label: Arts & Crafts; Format: DVD/CD; Documentary and Live DVD

== Singles ==
Title	Year	Peak chart positions										Certifications	Album
Title	Year	CAN	AUS	FRA	GER	IRE	NLD	SWI	UK	US	US AAA	Certifications	Album
"Mushaboom"	2004	—	—	—	—	—	—	—	97	—	9	MC: Gold	Let It Die
"One Evening"	2004	—	—	97	—	—	—	—	—	—	—		Let It Die
"Inside and Out"	2005	—	—	—	—	—	—	—	83	—	—		Let It Die
"Secret Heart"	2006	—	—	—	—	—	—	—	—	—	—		Let It Die
"My Moon My Man"	2007	13	—	—	—	31	— (Note: "My Moon My Man" did not enter the Netherlands' Single Top 100 but peaked on the Netherlands' Single Tip Chart at number three.)	87	29	—	8	MC: Gold; BPI: Silver	The Reminder
"1234"	2007	3	36	— (Note: "1234" did not enter the France singles chart, but peaked at number 7 on the France Digital Song Sales chart.)	75	33	97	63	8	8	11	MC: 2× Platinum; BPI: Gold; RIAA: 2× Platinum	The Reminder
"I Feel It All"	2008	47	58	—	—	—	—	—	—	—	22	MC: Gold	The Reminder
"Sealion" (Note: "Sealion" charted in Canada under the title "Sea Lion Woman".)	2008	94	—	—	—	—	—	—	—	—	—		The Reminder
"Honey Honey"	2008	—	—	—	—	—	—	—	—	—	—		The Reminder
"How Come You Never Go There"	2011	—	—	—	—	—	—	—	—	—	5		Metals
"The Bad in Each Other"	2011	—	—	—	—	—	—	—	—	—	30		Metals
"Bittersweet Melodies"	2011	—	—	—	—	—	—	—	—	—	—		Metals
"Pleasure"	2017	—	—	184	—	—	—	—	—	—	—		Pleasure
"Century" (featuring Jarvis Cocker)	2017	—	—	—	—	—	—	—	—	—	—		Pleasure
"—" denotes releases that did not chart

== Appearances ==
=== Contributions ===
Year	Artist	Song	Album
2006	Feist	"La Même Histoire"	Paris, je t'aime Soundtrack
2006	Feist	"We're All in the Dance"	Paris, je t'aime Soundtrack
2006	Gonzales, Feist & Dani	"Boomerang 2005"	Monsieur Gainsbourg Revisited
2007	Feist	"Somewhere Down the Road"	The Hottest State Soundtrack
2008	Constantines + Feist	"Islands in the Stream"	Non-album single
2008	Feist	"Please Be Patient"	A Colbert Christmas: The Greatest Gift of All!
2008	Stephen Colbert, Elvis Costello, Feist, Toby Keith, John Legend, and Willie Nelson	"(What's So Funny 'Bout) Peace, Love, and Understanding"	A Colbert Christmas: The Greatest Gift of All!
2009	Feist and Ben Gibbard	"Train Song"	Dark Was the Night
2009	Grizzly Bear and Feist	"Service Bell"	Dark Was the Night
2012	Feist	"Fire in the Water"	The Twilight Saga: Breaking Dawn – Part 2 soundtrack
2013	Feist feat. Timber Timbre	"Homage"	Arts & Crafts: X
2013	Feist feat. Timber Timbre	"Don't Give Up"	I'll Scratch Yours

=== Guest appearances ===
Year	Artist	Song	Album	Notes
2000	Gonzales	"Real Motherfuckin' Music"	Über alles	Vocals
2000	Gonzales	"Clarinets"	Über alles	Vocals
2000	Peaches	"Diddle My Skittle"	The Teaches of Peaches	Additional vocals, as Bitch Laplap
2001	7 Hurtz with Peaches + Bitch Lap Lap	"Sexy Dancer"	If I Was Prince	Vocals; tribute compilation to Prince
2002	Gonzales	"Shameless Eyes"	Presidential Suite	Vocals
2002	Gonzales	"Salieri Serenade"	Presidential Suite	Vocals
2003	Gonzales	"Lovertits"	Z	Vocals
2003	Gonzales	"Why Don't We Disappear"	Z	Vocals
2003	Gonzales	"Starlight"	Z	Vocals
2003	Albin de la Simone	"Elle aime"	Albin de la Simone	Vocals
2003	The New Deal	"Don't Blame Yourself"	Gone Gone Gone	Co-writer, vocals
2004	Jane Birkin	"The Simple Story"	Rendez-vous	Co-writer, vocals
2004	Kings of Convenience	"Know-How"	Riot on an Empty Street	
2004	Kings of Convenience	"The Build-Up"	Riot on an Empty Street	
2004	Kings of Convenience	"Cayman Islands"	Know-How	
2004	The World Provider	"Persistence Is Feudal"	Enabler	Vocals
2005	The North American Hallowe'en Prevention Initiative	"Do They Know It's Hallowe'en?"	Non-album single	Contributor
2006	Hypnolove	"Get to Know the Girl"	Eurolove	Co-writer, vocals, as Bitch Lap Lap
2006	Jamie Lidell	"Game for Fools" (Live in Paris)	Multiply Additions	
2006	Mocky	"Fighting Away the Tears"	Navy Brown Blues	
2006	Peaches	"Give 'Er"	Impeach My Bush	
2007	Teki Latex	"The Ish"	Party de plaisir	Vocals, as Bitch Lap Lap; written, produced and arranged by Gonzales
2009	Mocky	"Somehow Someway"	Saskamodie	
2009	Record Club		Oar	Vocals
2009	Wilco	"The Jolly Banker"	Non-album single	Percussion
2009	Wilco	"You and I"	07-13-09 – Keyspan Park – Brooklyn, NY	Vocals
2009	Wilco	"California Stars"/"You Never Know"	07-13-09 – Keyspan Park – Brooklyn, NY	Backup vocals, percussion
2009	Wilco	"Hoodoo Voodoo"	07-13-09 – Keyspan Park – Brooklyn, NY	Backup vocals, percussion
2009	Wilco	"You and I"	Wilco	
2010	Doug Paisley	"Don't Make Me Wait"	Constant Companion	
2010	Jamie Lidell	"Big Drift"	Compass	Co-writer
2010	Nikki Yanofsky	"Try Try Try"	Nikki	Writer
2010	Taylor Eigsti	"The Water"	Daylight at Midnight	Writer
2011	Jason Segel, Amy Adams and Peter Linz	"Life's a Happy Song"	The Muppets Soundtrack	vocals ("special appearance")
2012	Bahamas	"Snowplow"	Barchords	Vocals
2014	Kevin Drew	"You in Your Were"	Darlings	Backup vocals
2015	Jenny Lewis	"She's Not Me"	The Voyager	Music video cameo
2015	Mocky	"Living in the Snow"	Key Change	Drums
2015	Peaches	"I Mean Something"	Rub	
2021	Kings of Convenience	"Catholic Country"	Peace or Love	
2021	Kings of Convenience	"Love Is a Lonely Thing"	Peace or Love	

== Music videos ==
Year	Music video	Director(s)
1999	"It's Cool to Love Your Family"	
2004	"Mushaboom"	George Vale
2004	"Mushaboom" (alternate version)	Patrick Daughters
2004	"One Evening"	George Vale
2005	"Inside and Out"	Ramon & Pedro
2007	"My Moon My Man"	Patrick Daughters
2007	"1234"	Patrick Daughters
2008	"I Feel It All"	Patrick Daughters
2008	"Honey, Honey"	Anthony Seck
2011	"How Come You Never Go There"	
2012	"The Bad in Each Other"	Martin de Thurah
2012	"Bittersweet Melodies"	Holle Singer
2012	"Cicadas and Gulls"	Keith Megna
2012	"A Commotion"	Vice Cooler
2012	"Anti-Pioneer"	Martin de Thurah
2012	"Graveyard"	
2017	"Pleasure"	
2017	"Century"	
