= List of awards and nominations received by Feist =

Feist awards and nominations
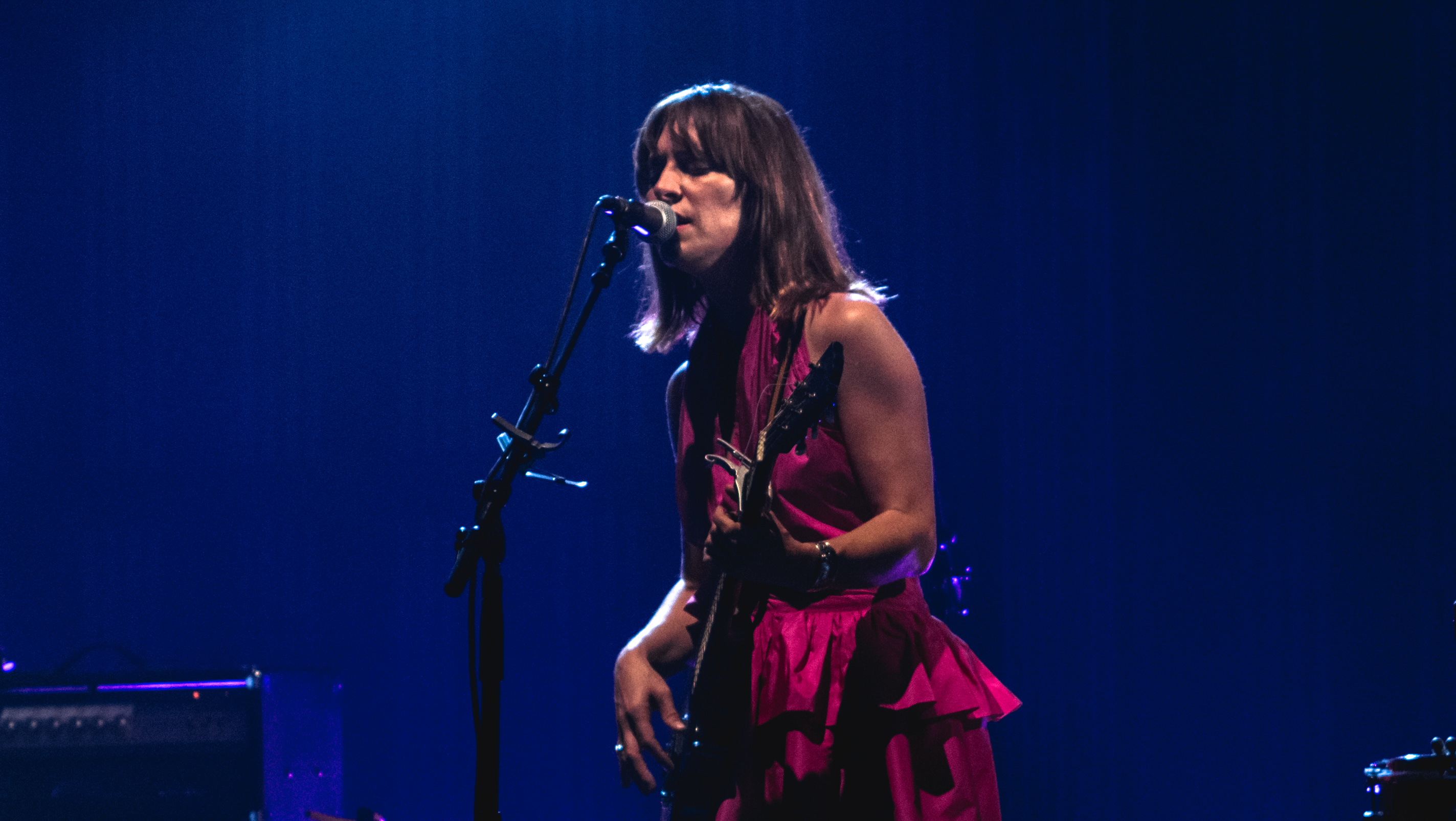
- Feist performing in 2017
Awards and nominations
Award	Wins	Nominations

Totals (Note: Certain award groups do not simply award one winner. They acknowledge several different recipients, have runners-up, and have third place. Since this is a specific recognition and is different from losing an award, runner-up mentions are considered wins in this award tally. For simplification and to avoid errors, each award in this list has been presumed to have had a prior nomination.)
- Wins: 14
- Nominations: 30

Feist is a Canadian singer-songwriter from Amherst, Nova Scotia. She has released four studio albums as a member of the indie rock supergroup Broken Social Scene: Feel Good Lost (2001), You Forgot It in People (2002), Bee Hives (2004), and Broken Social Scene (2005). All four albums were released with the Arts & Crafts record label. She has also released four studio albums as a solo artist: Monarch (Lay Your Jewelled Head Down) (1999), Let It Die (2004), Open Season (2006), and The Reminder (2007). These four albums were also released with the Arts & Crafts record label, with the exception of her first album, which was released by the Bobby Dazzler record label.

Feist has found success at awards shows in Canada, receiving eleven awards from sixteen nominations at the Juno Awards. She received five awards from five nominations in 2008 from the Juno Awards, including Single of the Year for "1234", Album of the Year for The Reminder, and Artist of the Year. She has also received four Grammy Award nominations, including Best Pop Vocal Album for The Reminder and Best New Artist in 2008, but has yet to win an award.

== APRA Awards ==
The APRA Awards are presented annually by the Australasian Performing Right Association (APRA). Feist has received one nomination.

Year	Nominee / work	Award	Result
2008	"1234"	Song of the Year	Nominated

== Antville Music Video Awards ==
The Antville Music Video Awards are online awards for the best music video and music video directors of the year. They were first awarded in 2005. Feist has one award.

Year	Nominee / work	Award	Result
2007	"1234"	Best Choreography	Won

== BRIT Awards ==
The BRIT Awards are the British Phonographic Industry's annual pop music awards. Feist has received two nominations.

Year	Nominee / work	Award	Result
2008	Feist	Best International Female Artist	Nominated
2012	Feist	Best International Female Artist	Nominated

== Grammy Awards ==
The Grammy Awards are awarded annually by the National Academy of Recording Arts and Sciences of the United States. Feist has received four nominations.

Year	Nominee / work	Award	Result
2008	Feist	Best New Artist	Nominated
2008	"1234"	Best Female Pop Vocal Performance	Nominated
2008	"1234"	Best Short Form Music Video	Nominated
2008	The Reminder	Best Pop Vocal Album	Nominated

== Juno Awards ==
The Juno Awards is a Canadian awards ceremony presented annually by the Canadian Academy of Recording Arts and Sciences. Feist has received 11 awards from 16 nominations.

Year	Nominee / work	Award	Result
2005	Let It Die	Alternative Album of the Year	Won
2005	Feist	New Artist of the Year	Won
2005	"One Evening"	Video of the Year	Nominated
2005	"Inside and Out"	Single of the Year	Nominated
2008	Feist	Artist of the Year	Won
2008	Feist	Songwriter of the Year	Won
2008	"1234"	Single of the Year	Won
2008	The Reminder	Album of the Year	Won
2008	The Reminder	Pop Album of the Year	Won
2009	Feist	Juno Fan Choice Award	Nominated
2009	"Honey Honey"	Video of the Year	Won
2012	Feist	Artist of the Year	Won
2012	Feist	Songwriter of the Year	Nominated
2012	Metals	Adult Alternative Album of the Year	Won
2012	Metals	Recording Package of the Year	Nominated
2012	Look at What the Light Did Now	Music DVD of the Year	Won

== MuchMusic Video Awards ==
The MuchMusic Video Awards is an annual awards ceremony presented by the Canadian music video channel MuchMusic. Feist has received two nominations.

Year	Nominee / work	Award	Result
2006	"Mushaboom"	MuchMoreMusic Award	Nominated
2007	"My Moon My Man"	MuchMoreMusic Award	Nominated

== Polaris Music Prizes ==
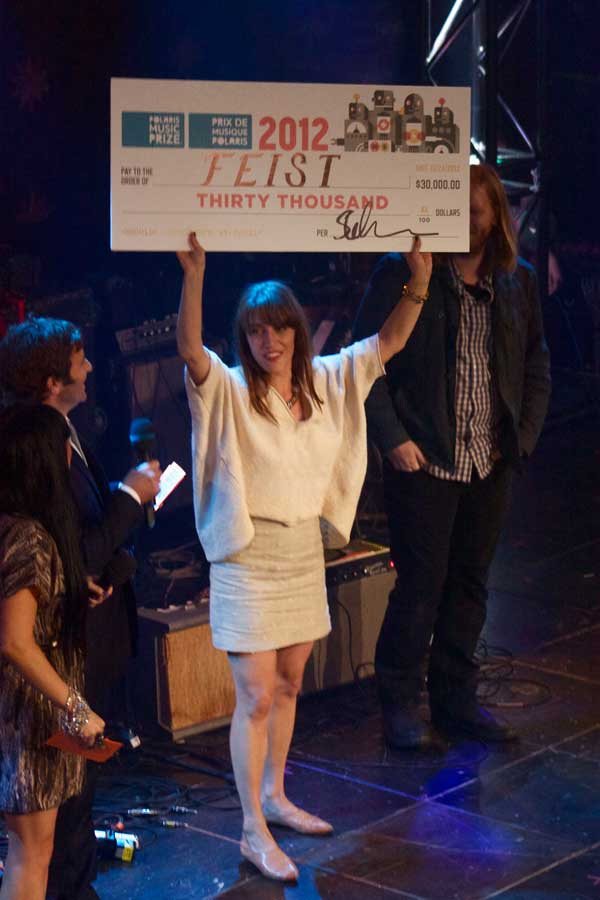
Feist after winning the 2012 Polaris Music Prize

The Polaris Music Prize is awarded annually to one Canadian album. Feist has received three nominations and won the award once.

Year	Nominee / work	Award	Result
2007	The Reminder	2007 Polaris Music Prize	Nominated
2012	Metals	2012 Polaris Music Prize	Won
2017	Pleasure	2017 Polaris Music Prize	Nominated
2023	Multitudes	2023 Polaris Music Prize	Nominated

== Shortlist Music Prize ==
The Shortlist Music Prize is a music award given annually to an album released in the United States within the last year. Feist has received one award.

Year	Nominee / work	Award	Result
2007	The Reminder	Shortlist Music Prize	Won

== UK Music Video Awards ==
Year	Nominee / work	Award	Result
2012	"The Bad in Each Other"	Best Cinematography in a Video in Association with Panalux	Won
2012	"The Bad in Each Other"	Best Alternative Video – International	Nominated
