= Look at What the Light Did Now =

Video and Live album by Feist
- Released: 7 December 2010 (Canada)
- Recorded: 2007–2009
- Genre: Alternative rock
- Label: Arts & Crafts Productions
- Director: Anthony Seck
- Producers: Jannie McInnes, Anthony Seck, Chip Sutherland

Feist chronology
| The Reminder (2007) | Look at What the Light Did Now (2010) | Metals (2011) |

Professional ratings
Review scores
| Source | Rating |
|---|---|
| AllMusic | 3.5/5 stars |
| Drowned in Sound | (8/10) |
| Indiewire | B+ |

Look at What the Light Did Now is a documentary/live album DVD/CD by Canadian indie pop artist Feist, first released in December 2010. The DVD comprises an 80-minute documentary directed by Anthony Seck, five music videos from 2007 album The Reminder, and a number of live performances recorded between 2007 and 2009, including covers of songs by artists such as Little River Band and Ron Sexsmith.

The set's accompanying CD features live tracks and solo piano takes of tracks from The Reminder, along with live covers of songs by artists such as The Kinks and Peggy Lee, and two studio recordings of a new song, Look at What the Light Did Now, written by Little Wings.

Prior to its December 2010 home video release, the documentary screened at number of international fall festivals, including the 2010 Raindance Film Festival in London, CPH:DOX in Copenhagen, and the Pop Montreal music festival in Quebec. Look at What the Light Did Now marks both Feist's first official documentary and first official live album.

== Reception ==
Look at What the Light Did Now received limited reviews upon release that were mostly positive. Music site Drowned in Sound gave the release 8/10, stating that it is "absolutely worth your time and attention," while at AllMusic, reviewer Andrew Leahey gave the release 3.5/5, commenting: "Feist sounds great throughout, with a quirky alto voice that, although imperfect, only seems to break at the right moments."

Meanwhile, film site Indiewire gave the film a B+ rating, stating that it was not a typical rock documentary. Reviewer Kimber Myers said it "sets itself apart with an aesthetic that veers between art film and hipster craft fair, a tone that perfectly matches Feist’s own music, itself a mixture of polished and smartly produced tracks and earthy, quirky additions".

=== Accolades ===
Look at What the Light Did Now won the 'DVD of the Year' prize at the 2012 Juno Awards in Canada, and was nominated for the Sound & Vision Award at CPH:DOX in Denmark.

== Tour dates ==
| Date | City | Country | Venue |
|---|---|---|---|
North America
| 15 May 2007 | Victoria | Canada | Royal Theatre |
| 16 May 2007 | Vancouver | Canada | Orpheum Theatre |
| 18 May 2007 | Edmonton | Canada | Winspear Centre |
| 19 May 2007 | Calgary | Canada | Jubilee Auditorium |
| 22 May 2007 | Regina | Canada | Conexus Arts Centre |
| 23 May 2007 | Winnipeg | Canada | Burton Cummings Theatre |
| 25 May 2007 | Toronto | Canada | Massey Hall |
| 26 May 2007 | Toronto | Canada | Massey Hall |
| 31 May 2007 | Ottawa | Canada | Bronson Centre |
| 1 June 2007 | Montreal | Canada | Olympia Theatre |
| 2 June 2007 | Quebec | Canada | Imperial Theatre |
| 8 June 2007 | Northampton | United States | Calvin Theatre |
| 9 June 2007 | Boston | United States | Berklee Performance Center |
| 11 June 2007 | New York | United States | Town Hall |
| 12 June 2007 | New York | United States | Town Hall |
| 13 June 2007 | Washington DC | United States | 9:30 Club |
| 14 June 2007 | Greensboro | United States | Carolina Theater |
| 15 June 2007 | Atlanta | United States | Variety Playhouse |
| 17 June 2007 | Manchester | United States | Bonnaroo |
| 19 June 2007 | Chicago | United States | The Vic Theatre |
| 20 June 2007 | Minneapolis | United States | Pantages Theatre |
| 22 June 2007 | Boulder | United States | Boulder Theater |
| 24 June 2007 | Seattle | United States | Moore Theatre |
| 25 June 2007 | Portland | United States | Crystal Ballroom |
| 26 June 2007 | San Francisco | United States | The Fillmore |
| 27 June 2007 | San Francisco | United States | The Fillmore |
| 29 June 2007 | Los Angeles | United States | Wiltern Theatre |
Europe
| 17 July 2007 | Portsmouth | United Kingdom | Wedgewood Rooms |
| 19 July 2007 | Manchester | United Kingdom | Academy 3 |
| 22 July 2007 | Birmingham | United Kingdom | Birmingham Glee Club |
| 24 July 2007 | London | United Kingdom | La Scala |
North America Leg 2
| 26 August 2007 | New York | United States | Beacon Theatre |
| 7 September 2007 | Buffalo | United States | Albright-Knox Museum |
| 8 September 2007 | Montreal | Canada | Oshega Festival |
| 9 September 2007 | Burlington | Flynn Theatre | |
| 11 September 2007 | Baltimore | Ram's Head Live | |
| 12 September 2007 | Philadelphia | Tower Theatre | |

== Track listing ==
=== Disc one (DVD) ===
Feature Length Documentary

- Look at What the Light Did Now directed by Anthony Seck

Music videos

- My Moon My Man directed by Patrick Daughters
- 1234 directed by Patrick Daughters
- I Feel It All directed by Patrick Daughters
- The Water directed by Kevin Drew and starring Cillian Murphy
- Honey Honey directed by Anthony Seck

Live Performances from The Reminder Tour 2007–2009

- Limit to Your Love
- Secret Heart (Ron Sexsmith cover)
- Help is On Its Way (Little River Band cover)
- The Water

=== Disc two (CD) ===
1. Look at What the Light Did Now (Solo) – 3:59
2. Limit To Your Love (Live) – 5:22
3. When I Was a Young Girl (Live) – 4:55
4. My Moon My Man (Live at the Cameron House, 29 October 2008) – 3:41
5. Secret Heart (Live Ron Sexsmith cover) – 4:40
6. Strangers (Live at the Cameron House, 29 October 2008, The Kinks cover) – 2:34
7. So Sorry (Live) – 3:46
8. Where Can I Go Without You? (Live in Paris 2007, Peggy Lee cover) – 3:37
9. Intuition (Chilly Gonzales solo) – 4:33
10. The Water (Chilly Gonzales solo) – 7:04
11. Sea Lion Woman (Chilly Gonzales solo) – 3:35
12. 1234 (Chilly Gonzales solo) – 6:39
13. Look at What the Light Did Now (Duet with Little Wings) – 4:09

Tracks 9–12: Chilly Gonzales Original Score - Songs from The Reminder improvised and performed on solo piano.

Total running time: 58:43
