= Patrick Daughters =

American director (born 1976)

- Born: 1976 (age 49–50); Berkeley, California

Patrick Daughters (born 1976 in Berkeley, California) is an American music videomaker and commercial director currently signed to Anonymous Content.

Daughters is a graduate of Walt Whitman High School in Bethesda, Maryland. While still in college, he gained attention with three award-winning short films: In Life We Soar, Any Creature about a young girl who witnesses a mysterious car accident, and Unloved. Unloved earned Daughters the $20,000 Grand Prize Award at Nintendo's Eternal Darkness film contest in 2002. He started directing music videos in 2003.

In December 2003 he directed a concert film for The Rapture titled The Rapture is Live, and Well, in New York City, filmed over a 3-day residency at New York's Bowery Ballroom, released on June 28, 2004.

His video for "1234" by Feist, consists of one single continuous tracking shot, and was nominated for a Grammy and won the award for Best International Video at the British CADs. The video was featured in "Stacks", a late 2007 commercial spot for the release of the third generation iPod nano directed by Mark Coppos and Virginia Lee.

He has also directed commercials for the ONDCP, PETA, Microsoft Zune, Ford, Clarks, Motorola ROKR E8 and Wrigley's. He frequently collaborates with cinematographer Shawn Kim and editor Anthony Cerniello.

== Videography ==
- Yeah Yeah Yeahs - "Date with the Night" (April 2003)
- Yeah Yeah Yeahs - "Maps" (September 2003)
- Secret Machines - "Nowhere Again" (July 2004)
- Kings of Leon - "The Bucket" (September 2004)
- Kings of Leon - "Four Kicks" (December 2004)
- Death Cab for Cutie - "Title and Registration" (January 2005)
- The Futureheads - "Hounds of Love" (February 2005)
- Kings of Leon - "King of the Rodeo" (March 2005)
- Muse - "Stockholm Syndrome" (2005)
- KT Tunstall - "Suddenly I See" (August 2005)
- Feist - "Mushaboom" (September 2005)
- Yeah Yeah Yeahs - "Gold Lion" (February 2006)
- The Secret Machines - "Lightning Blue Eyes" (February 2006)
- Snow Patrol - "Hands Open" (April 2006)
- Yeah Yeah Yeahs - "Turn Into" (May 2006)
- The Blood Brothers - "Laser Life" (October 2006)
- Beck - "Nausea" (October 2006)
- Albert Hammond, Jr. - "101" (November 2006)
- The Shins - "Phantom Limb" (December 2006)
- Bright Eyes - "Four Winds" (January 2007)
- Feist - "My Moon My Man" (March 2007)
- Feist - "1234" (March 2007)
- Bright Eyes - "Hot Knives" (June 2007)
- Mika - "Big Girl (You Are Beautiful)" (June 2007)
- Liars - "Plaster Casts of Everything" (July 2007; shown on Cartoon Network's Adult Swim show Off the Air episode "Nightmares" in 2012 that reran in reverse on Halloween night 2014)
- Interpol - "No I in Threesome" (August 2007)
- Har Mar Superstar - "D.U.I." (November 2007)
- Feist - "I Feel It All" (January 2008)
- Department of Eagles - "No One Does It Like You" (2008)
- Depeche Mode - "Wrong" (April 2009)
- Grizzly Bear - "Two Weeks" (May 2009)
- No Age - "Fever Dreaming" (January 2011)
- Depeche Mode - "Personal Jesus (Stargate Remix)" (April 2011)
- Phoenix - "Entertainment" (March 2013)
- Yeah Yeah Yeahs - "Despair" (June 2013)
- Adele - "Send My Love (To Your New Lover)" (May 2016)
