= How Come You Never Go There =

Single by Feist

from the album Metals
- Released: August 12, 2011
- Genre: Indie pop
- Length: 3:24
- Label: Interscope
- Songwriter(s): Leslie Feist

Feist singles chronology
| "I Feel It All" (2008) | "How Come You Never Go There" (2011) |

"How Come You Never Go There" is the only single from Feist's 2011 album, Metals.

An accompanying music video, filmed in New Zealand, was released on November 17, 2011.

== Musicians ==
- Feist - vocals, guitar
- Mocky - electric bass
- Chilly Gonzales - piano
- Brian LeBarton - drums
- Colin Stetson - tenor and baritone sax, French horn, trumpet
- Evan Cranley - trombone, euphonium
- The Real Vocal String Quartet - group vocals

== Charts ==
=== Weekly charts ===
| Chart (2011) | Peak position |
|---|---|
| US Adult Alternative Songs (Billboard) | 5 |
| US Rock Digital Singles (Billboard) | 29 |
