= Lovertits =

2000 single by Peaches

Single by Peaches

from the album The Teaches of Peaches
- Released: July 15, 2000
- Recorded: 1999
- Genre: Electronic, electroclash, synth-pop
- Length: 4:46
- Label: Kitty-Yo
- Songwriter: Peaches
- Producer: Peaches

Peaches singles chronology
"Lovertits" (2000)	"Set It Off" (2001)

Music video
- "Lovertits" on YouTube

"Lovertits" is a song by Canadian electroclash singer Peaches. It was released as part of the Lovertits EP in 2000 after Merrill Nisker adopted the performing name Peaches.

== Critical reception ==
Mark Desrosiers of PopMatters commented that the "Roland 505 sets up a glorious soundscape, and the whole retro-sound is compelling and unique."

Les Inrockuptibles listed "Lovertits" at number 16 on their Best Singles of 2000 list. In addition, Muzik placed "Lovertits" at number 3 on their Best Singles of 2000 list. NME placed "Lovertits" at number 98 on their 100 Best Singles of 2000 list.

== Music video ==
The song has a music video made in Super 8 format. The video shows Peaches dancing in front of a mirror and two girls riding suggestively on bicycles. One of these girls is Peaches' roommate, Feist.

== Cover versions ==
Feist created a rendition of this song in collaboration with Gonzales which can be found on her remix album Open Season.

== Track listing ==
- German vinyl, 12-inch single
1. "Lovertits" – 4:46
2. "Diddle My Skittle" – 4:50
3. "AA XXX" – 4:33
4. "Slap On" – 3:45

== Song usage ==
In 2007, "Lovertits" was used in the film Young People Fucking. It was also included on the DJ-Kicks: The Glimmers mix album.
