= Set It Off (Peaches song) =

2002 single by Peaches

Single by Peaches

from the album The Teaches of Peaches
- Released: 2001, 2002
- Genre: Electroclash
- Length: 3:17 (original); 4:02 (Radio Mix by Tobi Neumann)
- Label: Kitty-Yo
- Songwriter(s): Peaches
- Producer(s): Peaches

Peaches singles chronology
"Lovertits" (2000)	"Set It Off" (2001)	"Rock Show" (2003)

Music video
- "Set It Off" on YouTube

"Set It Off" is a song written and recorded by Peaches. The song was released as the lead promo single from her second album The Teaches of Peaches. The single peaked at number 36 in the UK and was chosen by NME as their single of the week.

== Critical reception ==
Jim Wirth of NME said, "Filthy, trashy and not entirely unlike Gary Numan after a sex change operation, Peaches is a winner all the way." Similarly, Mark Desrosiers of PopMatters described the song as "infectious and mnemonic."

The Face placed "Set It Off" at number 12 on their Best Singles of 2002 list.

== Chart performance ==
"Set It Off" became Peaches' first single to chart on the UK Singles Chart. It is her highest charting single to date on the chart. It debuted at number 36 and spent a total of 12 weeks in the Top 200 singles.

== Music videos ==
Two versions of the video exist. The first one was shot in Super 8 format and consists of three different shots of Peaches united simulating her entire body. Peaches is seen dancing in the video.

Nisker signed to a European contract by Sony. Her second video was a big-budget video for the Tobi Neumman version of song "Set it Off," in which she danced in a locker room and restrooms as her pubic and armpit hair grew to Rapunzel proportions. Sony dropped her after the music video's release and demanded their money back. This was the first music video that Peaches made with professional directors.

== Track listings ==
- German CD single, Maxi single
1. "Set It Off" (Radio Mix by Tobi Neumann) – 4:02
2. "Set It Off" (DJ Assault Accelerated Funky Mix) – 3:03
3. "Fuck the Pain Away" (Kid606 Going Back to Bali Remix) – 5:02
4. "Set It Off" (GMF Mix By Tobi Neumann) – 5:33
5. "Set It Off" (Lexy & K-Paul Remix) – 5:27
6. "Set It Off" (Northern Lite Remix) – 4:24
- German (Punkers Remix) CD single
1. "Set It Off" (Punkers Remix) – 4:02
- UK CD single
1. "Set It Off" (Radio Mix by Tobi Neumann) – 4:04

== Song usage ==
"Set It Off" has been used in movies Walking Tall and Cashback. In addition, the song is also used in The Cut (episode title: Rewind Me).

== Charts ==
Chart (2002)	Peak position
UK Singles Chart	36
