= Oi Oi Oi (album) =

Studio album by Boys Noize
- Released: 25 September 2007
- Genres: Electro house; electroclash; tech house
- Length: 67:30
- Label: Boysnoize Records
- Producer: Alexander Ridha

Boys Noize chronology
Oi Oi Oi (2007)	Oi Oi Oi (Remixed) (2008)

Professional ratings
Review scores
Source	Rating
AllMusic	4/5 stars
BBC Music	favorable
The Guardian	3/5 stars
NME	3.5/5 stars
PopMatters	4/10 stars
Resident Advisor	4.0/5

Oi Oi Oi is the debut studio album by German electronic music artist Boys Noize, released on 25 September 2007 by Boysnoize Records. In 2015, Vice placed it at number 93 on the "99 Greatest Dance Albums of All Time" list.

== Track listing ==
All tracks are written by Alexander Ridha, except where noted.

No.	Title	Writer(s)	Length
1.	"& Down"		4:19
2.	"Lava Lava"		4:02
3.	"The Battery"		5:26
4.	"Oh!"		5:06
5.	"Let's Buy Happiness"		4:53
6.	"Arcade Robot"		4:14
7.	"Deny Selected"		3:36
8.	"Shine Shine"		5:59
9.	"Vergiftet"		4:48
10.	"Superfresh"		5:27
11.	"Wu-Tang (The Battery Pt. 2)"		3:21
12.	"Don't Believe the Hype"		5:30
13.	"Frau" (featuring I-Robots)	G. Pandullo, M. Palmieri, A. Ridha	5:06

Bonus track by Feist
No.	Title	Writer(s)	Length
14.	"My Moon My Man (Boys Noize Remix)"	Feist, Jason "Gonzales" Charles Beck	6:40

== Charts ==
Chart	Peak position
Belgian Albums (Ultratop)	65
French Albums (SNEP)	95
