= Rock Show (Peaches song) =

2003 song performed by Peaches

Single by Peaches

from the album The Teaches of Peaches
- Released: 2003
- Genre: Electroclash; glam punk
- Label: Kitty-Yo
- Songwriter: Peaches
- Producer: Peaches

Peaches singles chronology
"Set It Off" (2001)	"Rock Show" (2003)	"Grab My Shaft" (2003)

Music video
- "Rock Show" on YouTube

"Rock Show" is a song written and recorded by Peaches. The song was released as a promotional and limited single from her full-length studio album, The Teaches of Peaches in 2003.

== Music video ==
There are two versions of the music video for "Rock Show", both of which were online in an e-card special of The Teaches of Peaches from Kitty-Yo.

== Cover versions ==
Electric Six covered the song with their version included as the B-side for Peaches' single-release. Peaches returned the favour by including a cover of the band's song Gay Bar as a bonus track on Fatherfucker.

The song was covered by Eels during their 2006 "Live and in Person! No Strings Attached" tour, with a London performance released on Live and in Person! London 2006.

== Song usage ==
"Rock Show" has been used in the VH1 television special Totally Gay! and the documentary Filthy Gorgeous: The Trannyshack Story.

== Track listing ==
1. "Rock Show" by Peaches
2. "Rock Show" by Electric Six
