= Multitudes (album) =

Studio album by Feist
- Released: April 14, 2023
- Length: 46:18
- Label: Polydor
- Producer: Leslie Feist; Robbie Lackritz; Blake Mills; Mike Mills; Mocky

Feist chronology
Pleasure (2017)	Multitudes (2023)

Multitudes is the sixth studio album by the Canadian singer-songwriter Feist. It was released on April 14, 2023, by Polydor Records. It is Feist's first album since Pleasure (2017). Three songs from Multitudes were released simultaneously with the album announcement: "Hiding Out in the Open", "In Lightning", and "Love Who We Are Meant To".

== Background ==
The work on Multitudes began following the birth of Feist's adopted daughter in 2019 and the death of her father. She recorded the songs while embarking on her live residency of the same name, throughout 2021 and 2022. In a press release, Feist explained the recording process and the inspiration behind the album: "The last few years were such a period of confrontation for me, and it feels like it was at least to some degree for everyone. We confronted ourselves as much as our relationships confronted us. It felt like our relational ecosystems were clearer than ever and so whatever was normally obscured — like a certain way of avoiding conflict or a certain way of talking around the subject — were all of a sudden thrust into the light. And in all that reassessment, the chance to find footing on healthier, more honest ground became possible, and the effort to maintain avoidance actually felt like it took more effort than just handing ourselves over to the truth."

== Singles ==
On the day of the announcement, three songs from Multitudes were released as singles: "Hiding Out in the Open", "In Lightning", and "Love Who We Are Meant To". The fourth single called "Borrow Trouble" was released on March 15, 2023, alongside a music video for it. The video was co-directed by Feist, Mary Rozzi, Colby Richardson, and Heather Goodchild.

== Reception ==
Professional ratings
Aggregate scores
Source	Rating
AnyDecentMusic?	7.7/10
Metacritic	85/100
Review scores
Source	Rating
AllMusic	4.5/5 stars
Evening Standard	4/5 stars
Financial Times	4/5 stars
The Line of Best Fit	9/10
MusicOMH	4/5 stars
NME	4/5 stars
The Observer	4/5 stars
Pitchfork	7.6/10
The Skinny	4/5 stars
Slant Magazine	2.5/5 stars

The album was shortlisted for the 2023 Polaris Music Prize and nominated for the Grammy Award for Best Engineered Album, Non-Classical at the 66th Annual Grammy Awards.

It won the Juno Award for Adult Alternative Album of the Year at the Juno Awards of 2024.

== Track listing ==
All tracks are written by Feist; "Borrow Trouble" co-written by Mocky, "Calling All the Gods" co-written by Todd Dahlhoff and Shahzad Ismaily^{[a]}.

Multitudes track listing
No.	Title	Length
1.	"In Lightning"	3:24
2.	"Forever Before"	5:17
3.	"Love Who We Are Meant To"	3:55
4.	"Hiding Out in the Open"	3:20
5.	"The Redwing"	3:17
6.	"I Took All of My Rings Off"	3:55
7.	"Of Womankind"	3:51
8.	"Become the Earth"	4:15
9.	"Borrow Trouble"	4:04
10.	"Martyr Moves"	3:25
11.	"Calling All the Gods"	3:47
12.	"Song for Sad Friends"	3:48
Total length:		46:18

- ^{^[a]} "Calling All the Gods" contains excerpts from Emily Wilson's translation of the Odyssey.

== Personnel ==
Musicians

- Leslie Feist – vocals (all tracks), additional vocals (1, 2, 5–9, 11, 12), drums (1, 2, 6, 9, 12), electric guitar (1, 2, 6, 8, 9, 11), keyboards (1, 4, 6, 12), recorder (1, 10), bass guitar (1), acoustic guitar (3–5, 7, 10, 12)
- Blake Mills – bass guitar (1), drums (6, 9)
- Gabe Noel – cello (1, 8), keyboards (2, 4, 10, 11), electric guitar (4, 6, 7), bass guitar (10, 12)
- Mocky – drums (1, 8, 9), recorder (1, 10), keyboards (3, 4, 8, 9), electric bass (4, 6, 9, 11), piano (10)
- Shahzad Ismaily – keyboards (1, 2, 5–8, 10, 11); additional vocals, drums, electric bass (11); organ (12)
- Todd Dahlhoff – keyboards (1, 4, 6–12), clarinet (2, 7, 8, 10, 11), bass guitar (5)
- Miguel Atwood-Ferguson – violin (1, 3, 7, 8)
- David Ralicke – baritone saxophone (2, 6, 9), tenor saxophone (2), flute (10)
- Amir Yaghmai – electric guitar (2, 4), acoustic guitar (4, 8), nylon-string guitar (5), violin (6, 7, 9, 12), brass (12)
- Chilly Gonzales – keyboards (2)
- Sarah K Pedinotti – additional vocals, percussion, field recording samples (11)

Technical

- Feist – production
- Blake Mills – production, mixing
- Robbie Lackritz – production, engineering (all tracks), mixing (9)
- Mike Mills – production
- Mocky – production
- Joseph Lorge – mixing
- Michael Harris – engineering
- Miguel Atwood-Ferguson – engineering (1, 3, 7)
- Mark Vreeken – engineering (6), additional engineering (7)
- Pete Min – engineering (6)
- David Reichardt – engineering (11)
- Samur Khouja – engineering (11)
- Shahzad Ismaily – engineering (11)
- Sarah K Pedinotti – engineering (11)

== Charts ==
Chart performance for Multitudes
Chart (2023)	Peak position
Austrian Albums (Ö3 Austria)	57
Belgian Albums (Ultratop Flanders)	13
Belgian Albums (Ultratop Wallonia)	91
Canadian Albums (Billboard)	96
French Albums (SNEP)	85
German Albums (Offizielle Top 100)	22
Scottish Albums (OCC)	21
Swiss Albums (Schweizer Hitparade)	18
UK Album Downloads (OCC)	26
US Top Album Sales (Billboard)	43
