= Pleasure (Feist album) =

Studio album by Feist
- Released: 28 April 2017
- Recorded: Early 2016
- Length: 53:28
- Label: Universal
- Producers: Leslie Feist; Mocky; Renaud LeTang

Feist chronology
Metals (2011)	Pleasure (2017)	Multitudes (2023)

Singles from Pleasure
- 1. "Pleasure" Released: 17 March 2017; 2. "Century"

Pleasure is the fifth studio album by the Canadian singer-songwriter Feist, released on 28 April 2017, through Universal Music Canada. Thematically, the album is said to explore "emotional limits ... loneliness, private ritual, secrets, shame, mounting pressures, disconnect, tenderness, rejection, care and the lack thereof." All of the songs on the album are actually raw takes, as Feist explained on her Twitter: "Our desire was to record that state without guile or go-to's and to pin the songs down with conviction and our straight up human bodies."

== Critical reception ==
Professional ratings
Aggregate scores
Source	Rating
AnyDecentMusic?	7.6/10
Metacritic	80/100
Review scores
Source	Rating
AllMusic	4/5 stars
The A.V. Club	A−
Entertainment Weekly	B+
The Irish Times	3/5 stars
Mojo	3/5 stars
The Observer	4/5 stars
Pitchfork	7.7/10
Q	4/5 stars
Rolling Stone	3.5/5 stars
Uncut	9/10

=== Accolades ===
==== Semester-end lists ====
Pleasure on semester-end best-of lists
Publication	Accolade	Rank	Ref.
The A.V. Club	The Best Albums of 2017 So Far	*	
Consequence of Sound	Top 25 Albums of 2017 (So Far)	13	
Exclaim!	Top 29 Albums of 2017 So Far	3	
Spin	50 Best Albums of 2017 So Far	24	
Stereogum	50 Best Albums of 2017 So Far	19	
Under the Radar	Top 50 Albums of 2017 So Far	13	

==== Year-end lists ====
Pleasure on year-end best-of lists
Publication	Accolade	Rank	Ref.
BrooklynVegan	Top 50 Albums of 2017	8	
Drowned in Sound	Favourite Albums of 2017	7	
Exclaim!	Top 20 Pop & Rock Albums of 2017	2	
Noisey	The 100 Best Albums of 2017	65	
The Ringer	The Best Albums of 2017	10	
The Skinny	Top 50 Albums of 2017	27	
Spin	50 Best Albums of 2017	42	
Stereogum	50 Best Albums of 2017	40	
Uncut	Albums of the Year 2017	74	
Under the Radar	Top 100 Albums of 2017	30	
Uproxx	50 Best Albums of 2017	26	

== Track listing ==
Pleasure track listing
No.	Title	Writer(s)	Length
1.	"Pleasure"	Leslie Feist; Dominic Salole	4:45
2.	"I Wish I Didn't Miss You"	Feist	4:18
3.	"Get Not High, Get Not Low"	Feist	4:57
4.	"Lost Dreams"	Feist	5:18
5.	"Any Party"	Feist; Salole	5:22
6.	"A Man Is Not His Song"	Feist	4:41
7.	"The Wind"	Feist	4:35
8.	"Century" (featuring Jarvis Cocker)	Feist; Jarvis Cocker; Brian LeBarton	5:53
9.	"Baby Be Simple"	Feist; Salole	6:21
10.	"I'm Not Running Away"	Feist; Salole	3:24
11.	"Young Up"	Feist; Salole	3:54
Total length:			53:28

== Personnel ==
Musicians

- Leslie Feist – vocals, guitar (all tracks); organ (3, 10, 11); drums, percussion (3); melodica (4), keyboards (5, 8), piano (7), electric bass (8), Mellotron (9)
- Mocky – background vocals (1, 5, 6), drums (1, 5, 6, 8), electric bass (1, 3, 4, 6, 9–11), Mellotron (1), keyboards (3–5, 7), percussion (3, 4, 7–9), organ (8)
- Paul Taylor – background vocals (1, 5, 6), electric bass (1, 2), synthesizer (1), drums (3, 10, 11), percussion (3, 7–9), programming (7)
- Chilly Gonzales – piano (1), organ (8)
- Renaud Letang – background vocals (6)
- Choir! Choir! Choir! – vocals (6)
- Colin Stetson – saxophone (7)
- Jarvis Cocker – oration (8)

Technical

- Feist – production
- Mocky – production
- Renaud Letang – production, mixing, engineering
- Mandy Parnell – mastering
- Thomas Moulin – engineering, mixing assistance
- Jane Tattersall – editing, sound design
- Bella Blasko – engineering assistance
- Guillaume Dujardin – engineering assistance
- Scott McDowell – engineering assistance

Artwork

- Mary Rasmussen – art direction, design
- Cass Bird – cover photo
- Jeremy Stewart – design
- Tyler Clark Burke – lettering
- Mary Rozzi – photography

== Charts ==
Chart performance for Pleasure
Chart (2017)	Peak position
Australian Albums (ARIA)	69
Austrian Albums (Ö3 Austria)	13
Belgian Albums (Ultratop Flanders)	14
Belgian Albums (Ultratop Wallonia)	38
Canadian Albums (Billboard)	7
Dutch Albums (Album Top 100)	70
French Albums (SNEP)	52
German Albums (Offizielle Top 100)	12
Irish Albums (IRMA)	41
New Zealand Heatseekers Albums (RMNZ)	3
Portuguese Albums (AFP)	27
Scottish Albums (Official Charts)	37
Swiss Albums (Schweizer Hitparade)	13
UK Albums (Official Charts)	48
US Billboard 200	91
