= Open Season (Feist album) =

Remix album by Feist
- Released: April 2006
- Genre: Indie rock
- Labels: Arts & Crafts, Polydor

Feist chronology
Let It Die (2004)	Open Season (2006)	The Reminder (2007)

Professional ratings
Review scores
Source	Rating
AllMusic	3/5 stars
Pitchfork	(6.6/10)

Open Season is a remix album by the Canadian singer and songwriter Feist, released in April 2006. The second version was released July 18, 2006.

The album contains alternative versions and remixes of songs from her award-winning album Let It Die, including collaborations with Peaches, The Postal Service, k-os and Kings of Convenience.

== Track listing ==
1. "One Evening" (Gonzales solo piano)
2. "Inside + Out" (Apostle of Hustle unmix live at the BBC)
3. "Mushaboom" (Mocky mix)
4. "Gatekeeper" (One Room One Hour mix)
5. "Lonely Lonely" (Frisbee'd mix)
6. "Mushaboom" (k-os mix)
7. "Snow Lion" (with Readymade FC)
8. "Tout doucement"
9. "The Simple Story" (with Jane Birkin)
10. "Lovertits" (with Gonzales)
11. "Mushaboom" (The Postal Service mix)
12. "Gatekeeper" (Do Right mix)
13. "One Evening" (VV mix)
14. "When I Was a Young Girl" (VV mix)
15. "Mushaboom" (VV mix)
