= Sea Lion Woman =

African-American folk song popularized by Nina Simone

"Sea Lion Woman" (also "Sealion Woman", "Sea-Line Woman", "See [the] Lyin' Woman", "She Lyin' Woman", "See-Line Woman", or "C-Line Woman") is a traditional African-American folk song originally used as a children's playground song.

== History ==
The song was first recorded by folklore researcher Herbert Halpert on May 13, 1939. Halpert was compiling a series of field recordings for the Library of Congress in Byhalia, Mississippi, when he ran across Walter Shipp, a minister, and his wife Mary, a choir director of a local church. Halpert recorded Shipp's daughters, Katherine and Christine, singing a spare version of "Sea Lion Woman" that defined the basic rhymes and rhythm of the song.

The exact origins of the song are unknown but it is believed to have originated in the southern United States. According to Tom Schnabel of KCRW, he was told that Nina Simone's "See-line Woman" was a 19th-century seaport song about sailors coming into port (such as Charleston or New Orleans) and prostitutes waiting for them, lined up along the dock, hence the term 'sea line' (a line of women by the sea) or alternatively, "see-line" (women standing in a line to be seen). In this account, their dress colors allegedly signified the specific services they offered.

Nina Simone popularized the song as "See-Line Woman". Her original studio recording was first released in 1964 as the single B-side of "Mississippi Goddam", a song that marked her turn to political engagement with Civil Rights protest songs. On the single's label, "See-Line Woman" is credited as having been written by George Houston Bass and arranged by Simone. The song was then part of her album Broadway-Blues-Ballads of the same year, and it was featured again as a single the next year, this time as an A-side coupled with "I Love Your Lovin' Ways". She often performed the song in concert, and, according to Tom Schnabel, Simone occasionally altered her lyrics.

== Song versions ==
Most versions of the song cover Nina Simone's lyrics and arrangement with syncopated hand-claps (or percussion) and more than one back-up voice for the response.

An early cover of Simone's version was recorded in 1967 by the Australian beat band the Easybeats as the closing track for their album Good Friday.

In 1987, Irish rock band Hothouse Flowers released a live recording of the song (credited only to G. H. Bass) on a 12" maxi edition of their first single, "Love Don't Work This Way", a year before their first album.

Nina Simone's version of the song was prominently covered by Feist for her 2007 album The Reminder. "Sea Lion Woman" was Feist's original title for this song but on the album it was shortened to "Sealion". It charted through digital downloads under the title "Sea Lion Woman" and peaked at No. 94 on the Billboard Canadian Hot 100 chart.

The folk-rock group Ollabelle rearranged the song in 2006 as a rock version for their album Riverside Battle Songs.

American experimental band Xiu Xiu covered the song as "See Line Woman" on their 2013 Nina Simone tribute album Nina.

The song was also covered by singers Katie Melua (featuring Arno) and Brooke Fraser (from New Zealand), among others.

An instrumental version of the song was recorded by jazz saxophonist Yusef Lateef on his 1967 Atlantic album The Complete Yusef Lateef.

== Remixes and sampling ==
A remix of the seldom used original recording of the traditional song performed by the Shipp sisters was produced by Greg Hale Jones and Russell Ziecker entitled "She Began to Lie"; it became part of the soundtrack for the 1999 feature film The General's Daughter.

A house remix of the song was produced by Jerome Sydenham and Kerri Chandler, calling themselves The Songstress, for Ibadan Records in 1997. In 1999, a UK garage version titled "See Line Woman '99" reached No. 64 on the UK Singles Chart and No. 3 on the UK Dance Singles Chart.

Nina Simone's 1964 recording was remixed by Masters at Work for a 12" single release in 2002 (coupled with the original 1964 recording), and was part of the Verve label compilation Verve//Remixed of the same year. Other remixes of the recording were produced by J.Views in 2008, and by Ogris Debris in 2012.

The song is sampled in H.C.P. by Frayser Boy from the 2003 album Gone on That Bay.

The Durutti Column sampled this on the track "Woman" on their 2003 album Someone Else's Party.

Kanye West sampled Nina Simone for the track "Bad News" on his 2008 album 808s & Heartbreak.

A house version of the song with samples of Nina Simone's recording by was produced by French DJ Bob Sinclar for his 2013 album Paris by Night.

A version is also found over the ending credits of the 2016 movie American Fable.

Wade's Remix of See Line by Dennis Cruz released by Solid Grooves Records.

== Lyrics ==
"Sea Lion Woman"
Sea Lion Woman (Sea Lion)
She drank coffee (Sea Lion)
She drank tea (Sea Lion)
And gamble, lie (Sea Lion)

Way down yonder (Sea Lion)
I'm going maul (Sea Lion)
And the rooster crow (Sea Lion)
And he got no lie (Sea Lion)

Sea lion woman (Sea Lion)
She drank coffee (Sea Lion)
She drank tea (Sea Lion)
And gamble, lie (Sea Lion)

Sea lion woman (Sea Lion)
She drank coffee (Sea Lion)
She drank tea (Sea Lion)
And gamble, lie (Sea Lion)

The children's song lyrics
Sea lion woman (sea-la)
She drinks coffee (sea-la)
She drink tea (sea-la)
In the candle light (sea-la)

Way down yonder (sea-la)
'Hind a log (sea-la)
And the rooster crowed (sea-la)
And the gander lied (sea-la)

"See-line Woman"

by Nina Simone and George Bass

See-line woman
She drink coffee
She drink tea
And then go home

See-line woman
See-line woman
Dressed in green
Wears silk stockings
With golden seams

See-line woman
See-line woman
Dressed in red
Make a man
Lose his head

See-lind woman
See-line woman
Dressed in yellow
Watch out, girl
She will steal your fellow

See-line woman
See-line woman
Black dress on
For a thousand dollars
She wail and she moan

See-line woman
Wiggle wiggle
Turn like a cat
Wink at a man
And he wink back

Now child
See-line woman
Empty his pockets
And wreck his days
Make him love her
And she'll fly away

See-line woman
Take it on out now
Empty his pockets
And she wreck his days
And she make him love her
Then she sure fly away
She got a black dress on
For a thousand dollars
She wail and she moan

© Warner/Chappell Music, Inc.
