= The Teaches of Peaches =

Studio album by Peaches
- Released: September 5, 2000
- Genre: Electroclash
- Length: 46:57
- Labels: Kitty-Yo, XL
- Producer: Peaches

Peaches chronology
Fancypants Hoodlum (1995)	The Teaches of Peaches (2000)	Fatherfucker (2003)

Singles from The Teaches of Peaches
- 1. "Lovertits" Released: July 15, 2000; 2. "Set It Off" Released: 2001; 3. "Rock Show" Released: 2003

The Teaches of Peaches is the second studio album by Canadian recording artist Merrill Nisker, and her first under the stage name Peaches. It was released on September 5, 2000, by Kitty-Yo. Her roommate Feist contributed vocals for the album.

In 2002, XL Recordings re-released the album and as well put out an "Expanded Edition" featuring a bonus disc.

== Writing and development ==
After creating a six-track "Lovertits" EP, Peaches moved to Berlin, Germany. While visiting her old friend, Jason Beck, who was enjoying modest European success as Chilly Gonzales in Berlin, Peaches landed a one-night gig. On the merits of that show alone, Berlin's Kitty-Yo label signed her on the spot. The label offered her the chance to record The Teaches of Peaches back home in Toronto.

== Composition ==
Musically, The Teaches of Peaches, like many other electroclash albums, draws from 1980s new wave music. It incorporates the Roland MC-505 and lo-fi beats in songs such as "AA XXX", which also features a roller-rink electro bassline. "Sucker" and "Rock Show" employ guitar and Runaways-like singing.

Lyrically, many of the songs on The Teaches of Peaches deal with pro-sex postfeminist themes. "Felix Partz" is a tribute to Felix Partz, a Canadian artist who was associated with the arts collective General Idea.

== Critical reception ==
Professional ratings
Aggregate scores
Source	Rating
Metacritic	73/100
Review scores
Source	Rating
AllMusic	4.5/5 stars
Blender	3/5 stars
Muzik	4/5 stars
NME	7/10
Pitchfork	7.5/10
Q	4/5 stars
Rolling Stone	3.5/5 stars
Sputnikmusic	4.0/5
Uncut	3/5 stars
The Village Voice	B−

The Teaches of Peaches received generally favorable reviews. The album holds a score of 73 out of 100 on the review aggregator website Metacritic. Heather Phares from AllMusic said, "Funny, sexy, outrageous, and danceable (not to mention endlessly quotable) all at once, The Teaches of Peaches is a great introduction to a unique artist who defines herself by gleefully blurring boundaries." Likewise, Mark Desrosiers of PopMatters described the album as "one of the year's defining albums."

The Guardian included The Teaches of Peaches in its 1000 Albums to Hear Before You Die. Slant Magazine placed it at No. 236 on its Best of the Aughts: Albums list. SPIN placed it at No. 10 on the Ten Memorable Albums From Forgotten Genres for electroclash. The Village Voice ranked it among the Best Albums of 2000.

At a performance on July 22, 2015, Trey Anastasio of Phish called The Teaches of Peaches the "greatest album ever".

In 2015, the album won the 2000s category of the inaugural Slaight Family Polaris Heritage Prize, an annual Canadian music award for classic albums released prior to the creation of the Polaris Music Prize.

The Teaches of Peaches was included on The Guardian's 100 Best Albums of the 21st Century list, based on a 2019 poll of music writers.

"The first four tracks are incredible," remarked Iggy Pop. "The way she uses the drum machine gives it a great sense of space. 'Fuck the Pain Away' is a great song. It sounds like the title to a Stooges track."

== Chart performance ==
After a glowing review in Q, The Teaches of Peaches sold 10,000 copies in its first three weeks. The Teaches of Peaches sold 50,000 copies worldwide.

As of 2001, sales in the United States have exceeded 15,000 copies, according to Nielsen SoundScan.

== Singles ==
- "Lovertits" was released as the album's lead single on July 15, 2000 by Kitty-Yo. The song was critically appreciated with reviewers complimenting its new wave sound. "Lovertits" appeared on several Best Singles of 2000 lists.
- "Set It Off" was released as the album's second single in 2001 by Kitty-Yo. It was later remixed by Tobi Neumann and re-released by Epic Records. "Set It Off" became a top forty hit in the United Kingdom, peaking at number thirty-six.
- "Rock Show" was released as the third and final single in 2003.

== Promotion ==
To promote The Teaches of Peaches, Peaches toured as the opening act for British alternative rock band Elastica. Elastica frontwoman Justine Frischmann had personally invited Peaches and Gonzales to open for Elastica's North American tour.

After "Set It Off" became a top forty hit, Peaches appeared on the British TV show Top of the Pops, but her performance was deemed too racy to be aired.

"AA XXX" was used in the 2003 Victoria's Secret Fashion Show and in the 2004 HBO documentary Thinking XXX.

The first track was used in the film Lost in Translation, although it was not included on the soundtrack.

In 2022, Peaches undertook a tour marking the album's 20th anniversary, which was profiled in the 2024 documentary film Teaches of Peaches.

== Track listing ==
All tracks are written by Peaches, except where noted.

No.	Title	Length
1.	"Fuck the Pain Away"	4:08
2.	"AA XXX"	4:30
3.	"Rock Show"	2:10
4.	"Set It Off"	3:15
5.	"Cum Undun"	4:20
6.	"Diddle My Skittle"	4:37
7.	"Hot Rod"	4:43
8.	"Lovertits"	4:42
9.	"Suck and Let Go"	6:27
10.	"Sucker"	3:37
11.	"Felix Partz"	4:28

Special edition bonus disc
No.	Title	Writer(s)	Length
12.	"Keine Melodien"	Jeans Team	3:26
13.	"Casanova" (featuring Mignon)	Peaches; Mignon	3:31
14.	"Sex (I'm a ...)"	Berlin	3:39
15.	"Felix Partz" (Remake with Gonzales)		2:57
16.	"Fuck the Pain Away" (Kid606 Going Back to Bali Remix)		5:03
17.	"Set It Off" (Radio Mix by Tobi Neumann)		5:32
18.	"Set It Off" (Tobi Neumann Video)		3:34
19.	"Set It Off" (Peaches Original Super 8 Video)		3:18

== Personnel ==
- Peaches – lead and backing vocals, producer
- Alorenz Berlin – design
- Steve Keeping – drums, mixing
- Bo Kondren – mastering

== Release history ==
Country	Date	Label	Catalog
United States	September 5, 2000	Kitty-Yo	KY55233
Germany	September 8, 2000	Kitty-Yo	KY00033
United Kingdom	October 21, 2002	XL Recordings	XL 163
Russia	2003	Soyuz Music, XL Recordings	XL 163
