= The Reminder =

2007 studio album by Feist

Studio album by Feist
- Released: April 23, 2007
- Recorded: March 2006
- Genre: Indie pop
- Length: 50:01
- Label: Arts & Crafts; Cherrytree; Interscope; Polydor
- Producer: Chilly Gonzales; Leslie Feist; Renaud Letang; Mocky; Ben Mink

Feist chronology
Open Season (2006)	The Reminder (2007)	Metals (2011)

Singles from The Reminder
- 1. "My Moon My Man" Released: March 6, 2007; 2. "1234" Released: April 2007; 3. "I Feel It All" Released: May 26, 2008; 4. "Sealion" / "Sea Lion Woman" Released: 2008; 5. "Honey, Honey" Released: 2008

The Reminder is the third studio album by the Canadian singer-songwriter Feist. It was released on April 23, 2007 in countries outside of North America, and May 1, 2007 in the United States and Canada.

Following its release, it debuted on the US Billboard 200 at number 16, selling about 31,000 copies in its first week, and debuted at number 2 in Canada, selling just over 18,000 copies. The single "1234" charted on both the U.S. Billboard Hot 100 and the UK Top 40. As of July 25, 2011, the album has sold 729,000 copies in the US. The Reminder was also the best-selling album of 2007 on the iTunes Store.

On November 25, 2008, a deluxe edition of the album was released as a two-disc package featuring nine bonus tracks on the second disc.

== Composition ==
Track 6 of the album, "Sealion", is an adaptation of a song by singer Nina Simone (Broadway-Blues-Ballads, 1964). The original title was "See Line Woman" (a reference to sealions was never intended), and refers to the life of an upper-class sex worker.

== Promotion ==
The Reminder was supported by four singles: "My Moon My Man", "1234", "I Feel It All", and "Honey Honey". The "My Moon My Man" single includes a remix by German electronic musician Boys Noize. Videos were directed by Patrick Daughters, who also directed the video for "Mushaboom".

During September 2007, the song "1234" was featured in Apple's television advertisement for the third-generation iPod Nano. The advert caused a sudden increase in the song's popularity, which resulted in a surge in the song's chart position. It reached number 8 in the UK Singles Chart on October 7 and number 8 in the Billboard Hot 100 for the week ending October 13. The music video was shot in a single unbroken take after two days of rehearsals.

eBay also used the song in Australian advertisements. Another single, "My Moon My Man", was used in a Verizon Wireless commercial.

== Critical reception ==
Professional ratings
Aggregate scores
Source	Rating
Metacritic	79/100
Review scores
Source	Rating
AllMusic	3.5/5 stars
The A.V. Club	A−
Blender	4/5 stars
Entertainment Weekly	A
The Guardian	3/5 stars
The Irish Times	4/5 stars
Pitchfork	8.8/10
Rolling Stone	3/5 stars
Spin	4/5 stars
Uncut	4/5 stars

This album was No. 35 on Rolling Stone's list of the Top 50 Albums of 2007.

On July 10, 2007, the shortlist for the Polaris Music Prize was revealed. The Reminder was announced as a finalist, alongside such other acts as The Besnard Lakes, Chad VanGaalen, and eventual winner Patrick Watson.

Kelefa Sanneh of The New York Times ranked The Reminder at #1, and Jon Pareles ranked it at No. 2 on list of the 10 Best Albums of 2007.

Time magazine named "1234" one of The 10 Best Songs of 2007, ranking it at #2. The song was written by Australian artist Sally Seltmann (a.k.a. New Buffalo). Writer Josh Tyrangiel called the song a “masterpiece”, praising Feist for singing it "with a mixture of wisdom and exuberance that's all her own."

Less than a year after its release, Blender listed the album 80th on their list of The 100 Greatest Indie-Rock Albums Ever. Online music magazine Pitchfork placed The Reminder at number 112 on their list of top 200 albums of the 2000s.

Feist won the 2007 Shortlist Music Prize for The Reminder; she is the second woman (after Cat Power) to ever win the award.

It won Juno Awards in 2008 for Pop Album of the Year and for Album of the Year. After winning her 5 Junos, in Canada her album sales shot back up the chart from No. 12 to No. 2, the position her album debuted at. It was also nominated for Best Pop Vocal Album at the 50th Grammy Awards.

Best of the year (2007) lists
Publisher	Accolade	Rank
Amazon.com	Best of 2007: Top 100 Editors' Picks	1
Amazon.com	Best of 2007: Top 100 Customer Favorites	11
National Public Radio	Listeners' Picks	3
No Ripcord	Top 50 Albums of 2007	11
Pitchfork	Top 50 Albums of 2007	19
PopMatters	The Best Albums of 2007	26
Rolling Stone	The Best Albums of 2007	35
Spin	The 40 Best Albums of 2007	18
Time	Top 10 Albums	3

== Track listing ==
The Reminder – Standard edition
No.	Title	Writer(s)	Length
1.	"So Sorry"	Leslie Feist; Dominic "Mocky" Salole	3:12
2.	"I Feel It All"	Feist	3:39
3.	"My Moon My Man"	Feist; Jason Beck	3:48
4.	"The Park"	Feist	4:34
5.	"The Water"	Feist; Brendan Canning	4:34
6.	"Sealion"	Feist; George Bass; Nina Simone	3:51
7.	"Past in Present"	Feist	2:54
8.	"The Limit to Your Love"	Feist; Beck	4:21
9.	"1234"	Feist; Sally Seltmann	3:03
10.	"Brandy Alexander"	Feist; Ron Sexsmith	3:36
11.	"Intuition"	Feist	4:36
12.	"Honey Honey"	Feist	3:27
13.	"How My Heart Behaves"	Feist; Andrew Whiteman	4:26
Total length:			53:41

- "Sealion" contains elements from "Sea Lion Woman" by George Bass and Nina Simone.

UK bonus track

14. "Honey Honey" (Live at Toronto's Danforth Music Hall) – 4:37

Japanese bonus tracks

14. "Intuition" (Live at Toronto's Danforth Music Hall) – 6:14
15. "My Moon My Man" (video) – 3:41
16. "1234" (video) – 3:14

iTunes Store bonus tracks

14. "Sealion" (Feist, Bass, Simone) (Chromeo remix) – 3:45
15. "The Water" (Red demos) – 4:13

Best Buy bonus tracks

1. "Honey Honey" (live with fade out) – 4:34
2. "Intuition" (live with fade out) – 6:14
3. "Fighting Away the Tears" (with Mocky) – 3:17

Deluxe edition second disc bonus tracks

1. "I Feel It All" (Escort Remix)
2. "Sealion" (Chromeo Remix)
3. "My Moon My Man" (Boys Noize Classic Mix)
4. "1234" (Van She Remix)
5. "Fightin' Away the Tears" [with Mocky]
6. "So Sorry" (One Mic Mix)
7. "My Moon My Man" (Grizzly Bear Remix)
8. Broken Social Scene: "Lover's Spit" (Redux)
9. "Islands in the Stream" (with The Constantines)
10. "My Moon My Man" [video]
11. "1234" (Director's Cut) [video]
12. "I Feel It All" [video]
13. "Honey Honey" [video]

== Singles ==
Physical Singles

- "My Moon My Man"
- "1234"
- "I Feel It All"

Digital Downloads

- "My Moon My Man"
- "1234"
- "I Feel It All"
- "Sea Lion Woman"

== Charts ==
=== Weekly charts ===
Chart (2007)	Peak position
Australian Albums (ARIA)	46
Austrian Albums (Ö3 Austria)	4
Belgian Albums (Ultratop Flanders)	16
Belgian Albums (Ultratop Wallonia)	38
Canadian Albums (Billboard)	2
French Albums (SNEP)	8
German Albums (Offizielle Top 100)	11
Irish Albums (IRMA)	61
Japanese Albums (Oricon)	92
Portuguese Albums (AFP)	29
Scottish Albums (OCC)	77
Swedish Albums (Sverigetopplistan)	8
Swiss Albums (Schweizer Hitparade)	12
UK Albums (OCC)	28
US Billboard 200	16
US Top Alternative Albums (Billboard)	5

=== Year-end charts ===
Chart (2007)	Position
French Albums (SNEP)	57
US Billboard 200	149
Chart (2008)	Position
Canadian Albums (Billboard)	24
French Albums (SNEP)	101
US Billboard 200	166

== Certifications and sales ==
Region	Certification	Certified units/sales
Australia (ARIA)	Gold	35,000^{^}
Austria (IFPI Austria)	Gold	10,000^{*}
Canada (Music Canada)	2× Platinum	200,000^{^}
France (SNEP)	Gold	75,000^{*}
Germany (BVMI)	Gold	100,000^{‡}
United Kingdom (BPI)	Gold	100,000^{^}
United States (RIAA)	Gold	729,000
Summaries
Worldwide	—N/a	1,500,000
^{*} Sales figures based on certification alone.^{^} Shipments figures based on certification alone.^{‡} Sales+streaming figures based on certification alone.

== Personnel ==
(Expressions in italics taken from the album credits)

- Leslie Feist – vocals, acoustic and electric guitars, banjo, piano on "The Water"
- Chilly Gonzales – piano, organs, vibraphone, drums
- Jesse Baird – drums
- Mocky – acoustic bass, Farfisa, organ
- Bryden Baird – trumpet, flugelhorn, percussion
- Julian Brown – electric bass, melodica
- Jamie Lidell – energy arrangement and vocals on "So Sorry"
- Town Hall (Jamie Lidell, Julian Brown, Bryden Baird, Mocky, Jesse Baird, Chilly Gonzales and Feist) – group percussion and backup vocals

Guests

- Ohad Benchetrit – the mystery on the bridge of "My Moon My Man"
- Charles Spearin – the mystery on the bridge of "My Moon My Man"
- Afie Jurvanen – leader of the lead guitars on the bridge of "Sealion"
- Sandra Baron – violin on "The Limit to Your Love" and "1234"
- Mary Stein – cello on "The Limit to Your Love" and "1234"
- Ben Mink – strings and acoustic rhythm guitar on "1234"
- Kevin Drew – backing vocals on "Honey Honey"
- Brendan Canning – backing vocals on "Honey Honey"
- Pierre Luc Jamain – organ bass on "Honey Honey"
- Lori Gemmel – harp on "Honey Honey"
- Eirik Glambek Bøe – vocals on "How My Heart Behaves"
