= 1234 (Feist song) =

2007 single by Feist

Single by Feist

from the album The Reminder
- B-side: "Fightin' Away the Tears"
- Released: April 2007
- Genre: Indie pop; folk-pop
- Length: 3:03
- Label: Cherrytree, Interscope, Arts & Crafts
- Songwriters: Sally Seltmann, Feist
- Producers: Gonzales, Ben Mink, Feist

Feist singles chronology
"My Moon My Man" (2007)	"1234" (2007)	"I Feel It All" (2008)

"1234" is a song by the Canadian singer-songwriter Feist from her third studio album, The Reminder (2007). The song was co-written by Feist and Sally Seltmann, an Australian singer-songwriter who also recorded under the stage name New Buffalo. It was a massive success in several countries, peaking at number 3 on the Canadian Hot 100. It remains Feist's biggest hit single in the US to date, and her only song to chart on the Billboard Hot 100 and UK Top 40, where it peaked at number 8 for both.

== History ==
In an interview with Songfacts, Sally Seltmann said:

I had been listening to Feist's album Let It Die. I thought my little song about lost love, and the hope to recapture what you once had, sounded too much like a Feist song for me to use for New Buffalo, so I shelved it. Then, in late 2005 I did a tour across Canada supporting Feist, and Broken Social Scene. After meeting Feist, I started to wonder whether she might like to do a cover of "1234," but I was too shy to tell her about it. At the last Broken Social Scene show, I plucked up the courage to tell her that I had written a song which I thought she might like to use. We went onto the tour bus, and I recorded a simple version of the song into her laptop, with guitar and vocals. To my surprise, she loved the song, and started playing it live.

On December 14, 2005, Feist played the song live at The Trabendo in Paris, France in a show broadcast on Europe2 TV, with the title "Sally's Song" and with somewhat different lyrics than in the commercially released version.

The original version of the song was mixed by Renaud Letang. It was later remixed by Van She Tech, an offshoot of the band Van She.

== Release ==
The song was digitally released through the iTunes Store. It gained notice after its use in an iPod nano commercial.

It also appeared in an Australian commercial for eBay. It has been released in the United Kingdom, in Canada and in other countries digitally.

== Chart performance ==
Since its digital release, "1234" peaked at number four on the US Hot Digital Songs chart. The single also reached number eight on the US Hot 100 the week of October 13, 2007, number 10 on the US Pop 100, and number 34 on the US Modern Rock Tracks chart. As of July 25, 2011, "1234" had sold 1.2 million downloads in the US. The single's unexpected success led to its release worldwide. In the UK it proved to be a huge hit, making the top 10 and peaking at number eight. It had a very successful release in Canada, making it to number two. The song also entered the top 10 in several European countries. The single's success made Feist famous globally and boosted sales of her other releases. It also managed to debut at number 67 on the Australian ARIA Singles Chart, as digital tracks were counted towards chart positions from November 5, 2007, onwards in Australia. It later entered the top 50 of the chart in late December and peaked at number 36. It also ranked number 34 in the Triple J Hottest 100. In April 2023, the single was certified gold by the British Phonographic Industry (BPI) for 400,000 sales and streams.

In the April 28, 2008, episode of The Colbert Report where she was a guest, Feist said that she had planned to offer "1234" as the official campaign theme for Stephen Colbert's presidential bid, before he dropped out.

== Awards and accolades ==
"1234" was nominated for Grammy Awards in the categories of Best Female Pop Vocal Performance and Best Short Form Music Video. Likewise, the success of the song largely contributed to Feist's other nominations that year for Best New Artist and Best Pop Vocal Album. It also won the Juno award for Single of the Year on April 6, 2008, in Calgary. Sally Seltmann also received a nomination at the 2008 APRA Awards for Song of the Year.

This song was number 19 on Rolling Stone's list of the 100 Best Songs of 2007, and number nine on the list of Readers' 25 Best Songs of 2007. It was also ranked number five on Amazon.com's Best Songs of 2007. Pitchfork Media deemed the video the fifth best video of the decade, and named the song number 16 on the top 100 tracks of 2007. Blender named the video number two on The Top 10 Music Videos of 2007. In France, the video won Music Video of the Year at the Victoires de la Musique.

Time magazine named "1234" one of The 10 Best Songs of 2007, ranking it at number two after "Rehab" by Amy Winehouse. Writer Josh Tyrangiel called the song a “masterpiece”, praising Feist for singing it “with a mixture of wisdom and exuberance that's all her own."

== Charts ==
=== Weekly charts ===
Chart (2007–2008)	Peak position
Australia (ARIA)	36
Belgium (Ultratip Flanders)	19
Canada (Canadian Hot 100)	3
Canada CHR/Top 40 (Billboard)	21
Canada Hot AC (Billboard)	13
Canada Rock (Billboard)	50
Germany (GfK Entertainment)	75
Ireland (IRMA)	33
Netherlands (Mega Single Top 100)	97
Scotland (OCC)	43
Slovakia (IFPI)	54
Switzerland (Schweizer Hitparade)	63
UK Singles (OCC)	8
US Billboard Hot 100	8
US Adult Alternative Airplay (Billboard)	11
US Adult Top 40 (Billboard)	30
US Alternative Songs (Billboard)	34
US Hot Digital Songs (Billboard)	4

=== Year-end charts ===
Chart (2007)	Position
UK Singles (OCC)	111

Chart (2008)	Position
Canada (Canadian Hot 100)	35
Canada AC (Billboard)	5

== Certifications ==
Region	Certification	Certified units/sales
Canada (Music Canada)	2× Platinum	160,000^{‡}
United Kingdom (BPI)	Gold	400,000^{‡}
United States (RIAA)	2× Platinum	2,000,000^{‡}
^{‡} Sales+streaming figures based on certification alone.

== Cover versions ==
The song was rewritten as a counting song for a performance on Sesame Street, in which Feist counts chickens, monsters (Elmo, Zoe, Rosita, and Telly) and penguins to 4.

Brooke White of American Idol fame performed a cover of "1234" during her set on the American Idols LIVE! Tour 2008, which ran from July 1 to September 13.

Electropop band Joy Electric released a cover of the song in 2009 on their album Favorites at Play.

Singer-songwriter Kenny Loggins covered the song for his 2009 album All Join In. The lyrics were changed because of dark subject material and the song also featured Kenny's 11-year-old daughter Hana.

Pianist Louis Durra recorded an instrumental trio version released on Mad World EP and Arrogant Doormats (2011).

== Parodies ==
It was parodied by MADtv for the continuous releases of new iPods, a commercial in which the song was originally used.

== In popular culture ==
It was sung by the character of Andy Bernard in "Lecture Circuit", an episode of The Office, in an attempt to woo a client he finds attractive. This attempt fails, and Dunder Mifflin loses the account. It was used in a trailer for the 2009 film New York, I Love You. It was also used in the ending of The Inbetweeners Series 1 episode, 'Bunk Off'.

The song plays over the opening sequence of "Green Juice," the third episode of the limited American drama series The Dropout about disgraced Theranos founder Elizabeth Holmes (2022).
