= I Feel It All =

2008 single by Feist

Single by Feist

from the album The Reminder
- Released: 2008
- Genre: Indie pop; guitar pop
- Length: 3:39
- Label: Cherrytree; Interscope; Arts & Crafts; Polydor
- Songwriter: Feist
- Producers: Gonzales; Feist

Feist singles chronology
"1234" (2007)	"I Feel It All" (2008)	"Sealion" (2008)

"I Feel It All" is a song by Canadian indie pop singer-songwriter Feist, released as the third single from her third full-length album, The Reminder (2007), in 2008. The song was acclaimed by music critics and appeared on several music charts, peaking at number 47 on the Canadian Hot 100 and number 22 on the US Billboard Triple A chart. The single-shot music video features Feist igniting many oil drums and fireworks as she runs around a field at night.

== Song information ==
The song is amongst the most critically acclaimed from her album. The New Yorker praised its tight instrumental arrangement and Gonzales' subtle production. It was performed live on Jimmy Kimmel Live! on May 15, 2007; the episode was taped on a bus and performed acoustic with a bell set replacing the piano. It was also performed on The Colbert Report on April 28, 2008, and on Late Night with Conan O'Brien on April 30, 2008. It was featured in the 2008 film The Women and in the 2010 film The Last Song. It was also featured on an episode of the MTV series The Hills, in several episodes of the British television sitcom The Inbetweeners, and in an episode of the VH1 celebrity series The Fabulous Life of.... In 2009, a cover version of the song appeared in a television advertisement for Masterfoods in Australia.

Feist is shown playing the song with Broken Social Scene in the 2010 film This Movie Is Broken. It is performed as a duet with bandleader Kevin Drew, and is intertwined with parts of his song "Safety Bricks".

== Music video ==
The video begins with Feist dancing in an open field around stacks of oil drums. During the first few moments, Feist hits an oil drum with a stick, causing fireworks to shoot out from them. In turn, all the other drums light up, and firework shoot onto the sky. For most of the rest of the video, Feist is seen dancing all around the lights produced by the fireworks, which no longer need to be hit to spark. Like in her previous video for "1234", the sounds in this video are not muted—the sounds of the fireworks cracking are perfectly audible. The video ends with an outburst of fog and Feist walking into a body of water. Also, like her previous videos, this one was done in one continuous shot. The music video was shot on the property of Perfect North slopes in Lawrenceburg Indiana, and the pyrotechnics were provided by Rozzi's Famous Fireworks. Feist was ultimately removed, via an ambulance, after complaining of a foreign object in her eye, after the last take.

== Track listing ==
European CD single

1. "I Feel It All" (album version) — 3:39
2. "I Feel It All" (Britt Daniel remix) — 4:41
3. "I Feel It All" (Gonzales remix) — 4:34
4. "I Feel It All" (video) — 3:50

== Charts ==
Chart (2008)	Peak position
Canada Hot 100 (Billboard)	47
US Adult Alternative Airplay (Billboard)	22

== Certifications ==
Region	Certification	Certified units/sales
Canada (Music Canada)	Gold	40,000^{‡}
^{‡} Sales+streaming figures based on certification alone.
