= Metals (album) =

Studio album by Feist
- Released: September 30, 2011
- Recorded: February 15 – March 17, 2011
- Studios: Big Sur, California
- Length: 49:58
- Labels: Arts & Crafts; Cherrytree; Polydor
- Producers: Leslie Feist; Chilly Gonzales; Mocky; Valgeir Sigurðsson

Feist chronology
The Reminder (2007)	Metals (2011)	Pleasure (2017)

Singles from Metals
- 1. "How Come You Never Go There" Released: August 12, 2011

Metals is the fourth studio album by the Canadian singer-songwriter Feist. It was released on September 30, 2011, in Ireland, Austria, Switzerland, Germany, Sweden and Belgium; October 3, 2011 in the United Kingdom; and October 4, 2011, in the United States and Canada. The first single from the album is "How Come You Never Go There", which was released on August 12, 2011. The album was supported by a world tour which started in Amsterdam, Netherlands on October 15, 2011, and finished on October 20, 2012, in Latin America.

Metals debuted on the US Billboard 200 at number 7, and sold 38,000 copies in its first week. It earned Feist's best sales week and it was her first top 10 album to chart in the US. The album received acclaim from critics. It won the 2012 Polaris Music Prize, an award for the best Canadian album of the year.

== Promotion ==
Promotion for the album began with short videos which feature snippets of tracks and the making of the album. They were posted on her website and other social networking sites since July 21, 2011. Four days after, she officially announced the release of Metals. Artwork for the album was revealed on August 2, 2011; previously, fans were given the opportunity to select the color design for the album cover on Facebook.

== Writing and recording ==
After touring for her previous album, The Reminder, Feist was "emotionally deaf". She stopped playing music for two years, saying that she "wasn't curious anymore". In 2010, she went to the studio in Paris where she had recorded The Reminder. After coming back from Paris six months later, she wrote most of the album. For recording Metals, Feist went to Big Sur with the lyrics almost completed and set up an ad hoc recording studio. Metals was recorded in Toronto and Big Sur, with collaborators including Chilly Gonzales, Mocky, Brian LeBarton, Dean Stone, and producer Valgeir Sigurðsson. They began recording the album in January 2011. She said of the recording process that "I allowed for mistakes more than I ever have, which end up not being mistakes when you open things up and make room for them."

The album's title was partially inspired by Charles C. Mann's non-fiction book 1491: New Revelations of the Americas Before Columbus, where it describes the Aztecs' and conquistadors' differing ideas about precious metals such as gold.

== Composition ==
For the album, Feist aimed for a sound she described as "modern ancient", mixing old and new instruments. She stated that the album had "more chaos and movement and noise than I've had before." The music of Metals is influenced by genres such as jazz and the blues, and contains elements of folk. The lyrics of Metals contain a lot of "nature imagery", as Feist was fascinated by the weather since "it makes you feel so minute." They also contemplate topics such as dying love, mortality and solitude. She also pointed to "Sealion" from The Reminder and said that it "grandfathered some of the concepts in Metals". There are many minor chords and open fifths on Metals, as well as a lot of voices sung in unison. The songs "How Come You Never Go There" and "Anti-Pioneer" are ballads, the latter she had worked on for ten years.

== Reception ==
Professional ratings
Aggregate scores
Source	Rating
AnyDecentMusic?	7.8/10
Metacritic	81/100
Review scores
Source	Rating
AllMusic	3.5/5 stars
The A.V. Club	B+
Entertainment Weekly	B+
The Guardian	4/5 stars
The Independent	4/5 stars
Los Angeles Times	4/4 stars
NME	8/10
Pitchfork	7.7/10
Rolling Stone	3.5/5 stars
Spin	7/10

Metals debuted at number seven on the Billboard 200, selling about 38,000 copies. It was Feist's best ever sales week, and was her first appearance on the top 10 of the Billboard 200. At Metacritic, a website which assigns a normalised rating out of 100 to reviews from mainstream critics, the album received a score of 81, based on 39 reviews, indicating "universal acclaim".

Spin gave "Metals" a score of 7/10, writing "Taken individually, each song is as sturdy as oak -- the guitars have a magnesium shimmer, and every instrument seems bathed in its own spotlight, especially Feist's vocals, which feel like they're being whispered directly into your ear." In a positive review, Lindsay Zoladz of Pitchfork Media gave the album a 7.7 out of 10. She noted that there was no "1234" on the album, which is the reason that "it feels like such a refreshing and slyly badass statement of artistic integrity" and also that "it doesn't reach The Reminder's heights." Andrew Leahey of AllMusic wrote that "Feist's days as a provider of hip, trendy TV jingles may be over", and that "Metals does its best work at a slower speed".

Elysa Gardner of USA Today gave the album 2.5 stars out of 4, and named "The Bad in Each Other" and "Caught a Long Wind" as the highlights of the album. A mixed review from Slant Magazine criticized most of the album for not having a "real spark to it" and stated that "Metals is too dull for [Feist] to overcome".

The album has received a number of accolades. The New York Times and The Globe and Mail named Metals as the best album of 2011. Uncut and Paste named it the 17th and 29th best album of 2011, respectively. Q named it the 29th best album of 2011. Feist was nominated for Best International Female Artist at the 2012 BRIT Awards for Metals.

The album was named as a longlisted nominee for the 2012 Polaris Music Prize on June 14, 2012. The album won the Polaris Music Prize making her the first female artist to win the award and, as of September 25, 2012, it has sold 141,000 copies in the U.S. As of January 2012 UK sales stand at 40,000 copies according to The Guardian.

== Track listing ==
All tracks are written by Leslie Feist, except where noted.

No.	Title	Length
1.	"The Bad in Each Other"	4:44
2.	"Graveyard" (Feist, Mocky, Chilly Gonzales)	4:17
3.	"Caught a Long Wind" (Feist, Mocky, Chilly Gonzales)	4:54
4.	"How Come You Never Go There"	3:24
5.	"A Commotion"	3:53
6.	"The Circle Married the Line" (Feist, Brian LeBarton)	3:22
7.	"Bittersweet Melodies" (Feist, Mocky)	3:56
8.	"Anti-Pioneer"	5:33
9.	"Undiscovered First"	4:58
10.	"Cicadas and Gulls"	3:16
11.	"Comfort Me"	4:04
12.	"Get It Wrong, Get It Right"	3:39
Total length:		49:58

iTunes Store bonus track:
No.	Title	Length
13.	"Pine Moon"	4:52

Amazon.com bonus track:
No.	Title	Length
13.	"Woe Be"	3:13

Japanese Edition (UICO-1228) bonus tracks:
No.	Title	Length
13.	"Woe Be"	3:13
14.	"Pine Moon"	4:52
15.	"How Come You Never Go There (Acoustic)"	3:54
Total length:		62:17

== Personnel ==
Band

- Leslie Feist – guitars, organ, piano
- Mocky – drums, acoustic and electric bass, piano
- Chilly Gonzales – piano, organ, electric bass, drums
- Brian LeBarton – organs, synths, piano, electric bass, drums
- Dean Stone – drums, percussion

Additional musicians

- Colin Stetson – bass, baritone and tenor saxophones, bass and tenor clarinets, French horn, flute, trumpet
- Evan Cranley – euphonium, trombone
- Bry Webb – voice (on "The Bad in Each Other")
- Irene Sazer – violin, group vocals
- Alisa Rose – violin, group vocals
- Dina Maccabee – viola, group vocals
- Jessica Ivry – cello, group vocals

Technical

- Robbie Lackritz – engineering, mixing (on "Caught a Long Wind" and "The Circle Married the Line")
- Lionel Darenne – engineering, mixing ("Cicadas and Gulls")
- Renaud Letang – mixing (except where noted)
- Howie Beck – mixing (on "Undiscovered First")
- Thomas Moulin – mix assistance
- Mandy Parnell – mastering
- Philip Shaw Bova – additional mastering
- Management – Chip Sutherland and Robbie Lackritz

Arrangement

- Feist – arrangement, string and horn arrangements
- Mocky – arrangement, string and horn arrangements
- Chilly Gonzales – arrangement, string and horn arrangements
- Colin Stetson – additional horn arrangements
- Evan Cranley – additional horn arrangements
- Valgeir Sigurðsson – additional horn arrangements

Design

- Jannie McInnes – creative direction
- Mary Rozzi – photography
- Heather Goodchild – typography, print design
- Graydon Sheppard – graphic design, with:
  - Robyn Kotyk
  - Petra Cuschierl
  - Sammy Rawal
  - Rory Them Finest
- Dean Conger/National Geographic Stock – additional photography
- Sammy Rawal – additional photography

== Charts ==
Chart (2011)	Peak position
Australian Albums Chart	17
Austrian Albums Chart	11
Belgian Albums Chart (Flanders)	7
Belgian Albums Chart (Wallonia)	18
Canadian Albums Chart	2
Danish Albums Chart	10
Dutch Albums Chart	34
Finnish Albums Chart	30
French Albums Chart	9
German Albums Chart	6
Irish Albums Chart	27
New Zealand Albums Chart	13
Norwegian Albums Chart	10
Portuguese Albums Chart	21
Spanish Albums Chart	72
Swedish Albums Chart	18
Swiss Albums Chart	9
UK Albums Chart	28
U.S. Billboard 200	7
U.S. Billboard Rock Albums	1

== Certifications and sales ==
Region	Certification	Certified units/sales
Canada (Music Canada)	Platinum	80,000^{^}
France	—	20,000
United Kingdom	—	40,000
United States	—	141,000
^{^} Shipments figures based on certification alone.

== Tour ==
Metals Tour

=== Opening act ===
- Chilly Gonzales (select dates)
- M. Ward (select dates)
- Timber Timbre (select dates)
- Bon Iver (select dates)
- The Low Anthem (select dates)

Date	City	Country	Venue
Europe
15 October 2011	Amsterdam	Netherlands	Carre Theater
17 October 2011	London	United Kingdom	Palladium
19 October 2011	Brussels	Belgium	Cirque Royal
20 October 2011	Paris	France	Olympia
22 October 2011	Berlin	Germany	Tempodrom
North America
29 October 2011	Philadelphia	United States	World Cafe 20th Anniversary
2 November 2011	New York City	United States	Howard Gilman Opera House
4 November 2011	Chicago	United States	Riviera Theater
6 November 2011	Atlanta	United States	The Tabernacle
8 November 2011	Dallas	United States	Majestic Theatre
12 November 2011	Los Angeles	United States	The Wiltern
14 November 2011	San Francisco	United States	The Warfield
16 November 2011	Portland, Oregon	United States	Arlene Schnitzer Concert Hall
17 November 2011	Seattle	United States	The Moore Theater
18 November 2011	Vancouver	Canada	The Centre In Vancouver For Performing Arts
20 November 2011	Edmonton	Canada	Northern Alberta Jubilee Auditorium
21 November 2011	Calgary	Canada	Jack Singer Concert Hall
1 December 2011	Toronto	Canada	Massey Hall
3 December 2011	Montreal	Canada	Métropolis
5 December 2011	Ottawa	Canada	National Arts Centre
6 December 2011	Quebec City	Canada	Grand Théâtre de Québec
12 December 2011	Mexico City	Mexico	Teatro Fru Fru
13 December 2011	Mexico City	Mexico	Teatro Fru Fru
15 December 2011	Mexico City	Mexico	Teatro Fru Fru
16 December 2011	Mexico City	Mexico	Teatro Fru Fru
Oceania
28 January 2012	Brisbane	Australia	Laneway Festival
30 January 2012	Auckland	Australia	Laneway Festival
1 February 2012	Melbourne	Australia	Palais Theatre
4 February 2012	Melbourne	Australia	Laneway Festival
5 February 2012	Sydney	Australia	Laneway Festival
7 February 2012	Sydney	Australia	Enmore Theatre
9 February 2012	Adelaide	Australia	Thebarton Theatre
11 February 2012	Perth	Australia	Laneway Festival
Asia
12 February 2012	Singapore		Laneway Festival
15 February 2012	Jakarta	Indonesia	Fairgrounds
Europe
6 March 2012	Oslo	Norway	Sentrum Scene
7 March 2012	Stockholm	Sweden	Cirkus
8 March 2012	Copenhagen	Denmark	Falkoner Theatre
10 March 2012	Vienna	Austria	Gasometer
11 March 2012	Zürich	Switzerland	Volkshaus
12 March 2012	Munich	Germany	Tonhalle
13 March 2012	Cologne	Germany	E-Werk
15 March 2012	Frankfurt	Germany	Jahrhunderthalle
18 March 2012	Lisbon	Portugal	Coliseu
19 March 2012	Porto	Portugal	Coliseu
21 March 2012	Paris	France	Le Zénith
22 March 2012	Villeurbanne	France	Transbordeur
23 March 2012	Lille	France	Theatre Sebastopol
25 March 2012	London	United Kingdom	Royal Albert Hall
26 March 2012	Manchester	United Kingdom	O2 Apollo
27 March 2012	Glasgow	United Kingdom	Royal Concert Hall
North America
14 April 2012	Indio	United States	Coachella Music Festival
21 April 2012	Indio	United States	Coachella Music Festival
22 April 2012	Phoenix	United States	Orpheum Theater
23 April 2012	Tucson	United States	TCC Arena
25 April 2012	Marfa	United States	Crowley Theatre
26 April 2012	Austin	United States	Stubb's
28 April 2012	New Orleans	United States	New Orleans Jazz & Heritage Festival
30 April 2012	Indianapolis	United States	Egyptian Room
1 May 2012	Nashville	United States	Ryman Auditorium
2 May 2012	Asheville	United States	Thomas Wolfe Auditorium
3 May 2012	Raleigh	United States	Memorial Auditorium
5 May 2012	New York	United States	Radio City Music Hall
7 May 2012	Boston	United States	House of Blues
8 May 2012	Philadelphia	United States	Academy of Music
9 May 2012	North Bethesda	United States	Strathmore
11 May 2012	Burlington, Vermont	United States	Flynn Theater
28 May 2012	George, Washington	United States	Sasquatch! Music Festival
29 May 2012	Boise, Idaho	United States	Idaho Botanical Garden
31 May 2012	Morrison, Colorado	United States	Red Rocks Amphitheatre
2 June 2012	Minneapolis	United States	Zoo Amphitheater
3 June 2012	Madison	United States	Orpheum Theatre
5 June 2012	Ann Arbor	United States	Ann Arbor Summer Festival
6 June 2012	Columbus	United States	Wexner Center
8 June 2012	Manchester, Tennessee	United States	Bonnaroo Music Festival
22 June 2012	Calgary	Canada	Sled Island Festival
23 June 2012	Saskatchewan	Canada	Sasktel Saskatchewan Jazz Fest
4 July 2012	Winnipeg	Canada	Winnipeg Folk Festival
13 July 2012	Chicago	United States	Pitchfork Music Festival
14 July 2012	Pittsburgh	United States	Stage AE
15 July 2012	Buffalo, New York	United States	Buffalo Place Rocks the Harbor
4 August 2012	Montreal	Canada	Osheaga Festival
Europe
8 August 2012	Oslo	Norway	Oya Festival
10 August 2012	Gothenburg	Sweden	Way Out West Festival
12 August 2012	Helsinki	Finland	Flow Festival
13 August 2012	Tallinn	Estonia	Kadioru Castle Flower Garden
15 August 2012	Hamburg	Germany	Stadtpark
16 August 2012	Hasselt	Belgium	Pukkelpop
17 August 2012	Biddinghuizen	Netherlands	Lowlands
19 August 2012	Brecon Beacons	United Kingdom	Green Man Festival
21 August 2012	Cologne	Germany	Tanzbrunnen
22 August 2012	Stuttgart	Germany	Freilichtbuhne Killesberg
23 August 2012	Lausanne	Switzerland	For Noise Festival
25 August 2012	Istanbul	Turkey	Istanbul Jazz Festival
North America
31 August 2012	Rouyn-Noranda	Canada	Festival de Musique Emergente
1 September 2012	Hamilton	Canada	Greenbelt Harvest Picnic
Latin America
18 October 2012	Buenos Aires	Argentina	Teatro Opera
20 October 2012	Santiago	Chile	Teatro Caupolicán
22 October 2012	São Paulo	Brazil	Cine Joia
23 October 2012	São Paulo	Brazil	Cine Joia
24 October 2012	Rio de Janeiro	Brazil	Circo Voador
23 November 2012	Querétaro	Mexico	Indio Emergente
24 November 2012	Puebla	Mexico	Indio Emergente
25 November 2012	Guadalajara	Mexico	Indio Emergente

== Release history ==
Region	Date	Format	Label
Worldwide	September 30, 2011	Digital download	Polydor
Germany	September 30, 2011	CD, Vinyl	Polydor
France	October 3, 2011	CD, Vinyl	Polydor
United Kingdom	October 3, 2011	CD, Download, Vinyl	Polydor
Canada	October 4, 2011	CD, Download, Vinyl	Arts & Crafts
United States	October 4, 2011	CD, Download, Vinyl	Cherrytree
