= Let It Die (album) =

Studio album by Feist
- Released: May 18, 2004
- Recorded: 2002–2003
- Studios: Ferber, Paris
- Genres: Lounge; indie pop; French pop; folk; jazz
- Length: 38:34 (CAN); 37:49 (US & UK)
- Labels: Arts & Crafts; Polydor
- Producer: Renaud Letang

Feist chronology
Monarch (Lay Your Jewelled Head Down) (1999)	Let It Die (2004)	Open Season (2006)

Alternative cover
- US release by Cherrytree Records

Let It Die is the second studio album by the Canadian singer-songwriter Feist. It was released in Canada on May 18, 2004, by Arts & Crafts Records. Recorded at Paris's Studios Ferber in 2002 and 2003, the album combines jazz, bossa nova and indie rock.

== Background ==
Let It Die was welcomed as one of the best Canadian pop albums of 2004. It was nominated for three Juno Awards in 2005, and won two: Best Alternative Album and Best New Artist. A track from the album, "Inside and Out", was nominated as Single of the Year in the 2006 Juno Awards. In 2012, NOW Magazine ranked Let It Die at No. 4 on list of The 50 Best Toronto Albums Ever.

Let It Die has attracted a significant international audience. The album was originally divided into original compositions on the first half and cover versions on the second, though a reissue later in 2004 added a further original composition as the penultimate track.

== Composition ==
=== Music and lyrics ===
Barry Walters of Rolling Stone likened Feist's vocals on the album to "the jazz tingle of Peggy Lee", and her melodicism to Tin Pan Alley. Walters also said that Let It Die to draw influence from chamber pop, chill-out, postmodern folk, and Burt Bacharach, and described the album as "indie lounge pop".

Let It Die contains elements of folk, bossa nova, and indie rock.

== Critical reception ==
Professional ratings
Review scores
Source	Rating
AllMusic	4.5/5 stars
The Austin Chronicle	4/5 stars
The Boston Phoenix	3/4 stars
Entertainment Weekly	A−
The Guardian	3/5 stars
The Irish Times	3/5 stars
Pitchfork	8.1/10
PopMatters	8/10
Rolling Stone	4/5 stars
Uncut	8/10

MacKenzie Wilson of AllMusic gave praise to the various production choices on the tracks and the vocal work over it, saying that "[S]he's playful with her design and the overall composition flows nicely. Feist has varied styles and sounds just right, and that's what makes Let It Die the secret treasure that it is." Barry Walters, writing for Rolling Stone, also lauded praise for the album's eclectic genre and vocal dynamics, saying that "Feist proves she's a modern gal with a sparse yet varied sound that draws from chamber pop, chill-out, postmodern folk, Burt Bacharach and beyond."

At the 2017 Polaris Music Prize, the album won the public vote for the Heritage Prize in the 1996–2005 category.

== Track listing ==
=== Canadian release ===
All tracks are written by Feist, except where noted.

1. "Gatekeeper" (Feist, Gonzales) – 2:16
2. "Mushaboom" – 3:44
3. "Let It Die" – 2:55
4. "One Evening" – 3:36
5. "Leisure Suite" (Feist, Gonzales) – 4:07
6. "L'amour ne dure pas toujours" (Françoise Hardy) – 3:16
7. "Lonely Lonely" (music by Tony Scherr, lyrics by Feist) – 4:10
8. "When I Was a Young Girl" (trad., inspired by Texas Gladden) – 3:08
9. "Secret Heart" (Ron Sexsmith) – 3:49
10. "Inside and Out" (Barry Gibb, Maurice Gibb, Robin Gibb) – 4:17
11. "Now at Last" (Bob Haymes) – 3:16

=== US and UK release ===
All tracks are written by Feist, except where noted.

1. "Gatekeeper" (Feist, Gonzales) – 2:16
2. "Mushaboom" – 3:44
3. "Let It Die" – 2:55
4. "One Evening" – 3:36
5. "Leisure Suite" (Feist, Gonzales) – 4:07
6. "Lonely Lonely" (music by Scherr, lyrics by Feist) – 4:10
7. "When I Was a Young Girl" (trad., inspired by Gladden) – 3:08
8. "Secret Heart" (Sexsmith) – 3:49
9. "Inside and Out" (B. Gibb, M. Gibb, R. Gibb) – 4:17
10. "Tout doucement" (Emile Jean Mercadier, Rene Albert Clausier) – 2:31
11. "Now at Last" (Haymes) – 3:16

== Personnel ==
- Gonzales – piano, various instruments
- Feist – guitar, vocals
- Julien Chirol – trombone
- Frédéric Couderc – saxophone

== Charts ==
Chart	Peak position
Austrian Albums Chart	51
Belgian Albums Chart (Wallonia)	47
French Albums Chart	38
German Albums Chart	92
U.S. Billboard Top Heatseekers	36

== Certifications and sales ==
Region	Certification	Certified units/sales
Canada (Music Canada)	Platinum	115,000
France (SNEP)	Gold	100,000^{*}
United Kingdom (BPI)	Silver	60,000^{‡}
United States	—	190,000
Summaries
Worldwide	—	500,000
^{*} Sales figures based on certification alone.^{‡} Sales+streaming figures based on certification alone.
