= Feist (singer) =

Canadian singer

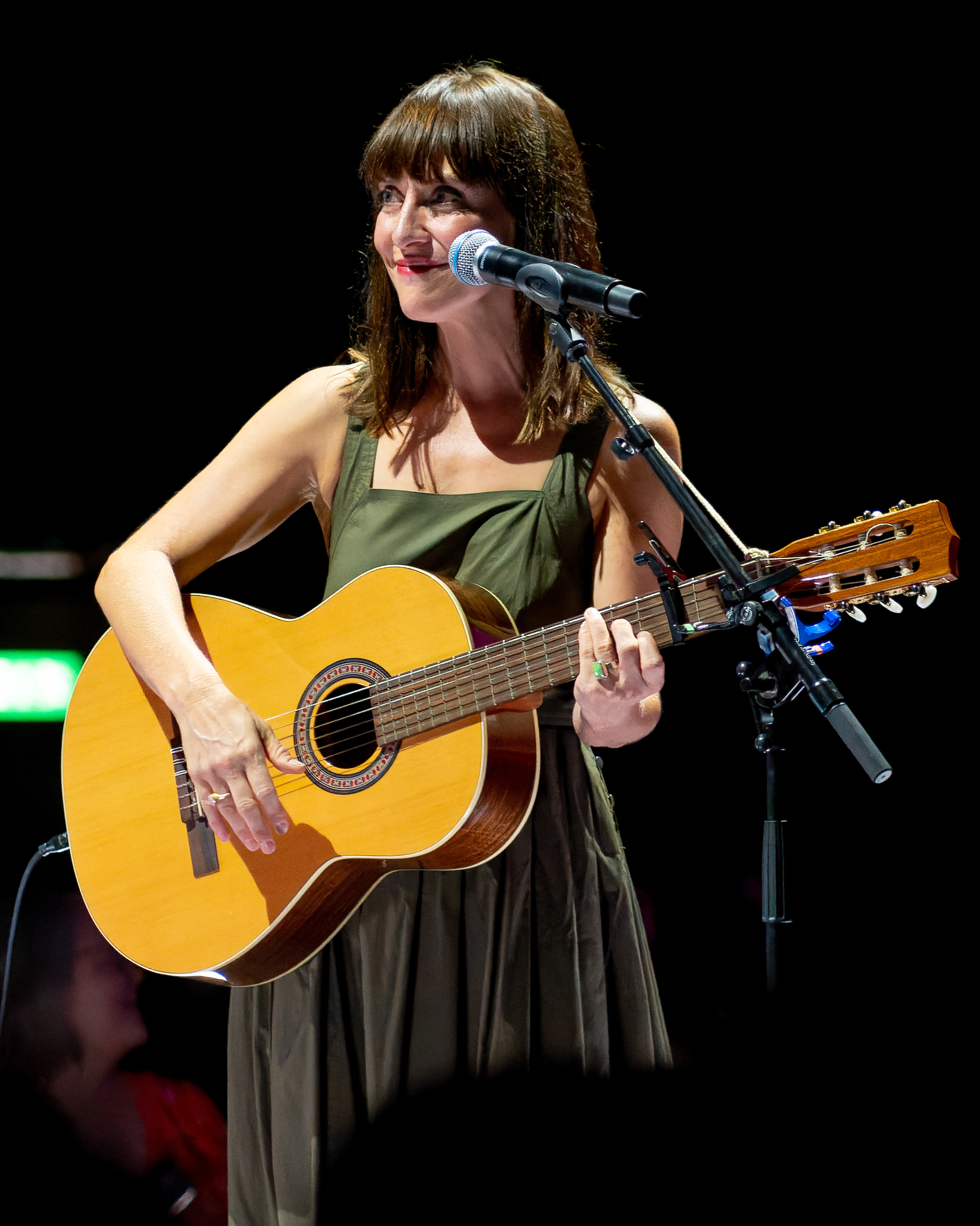
- Feist at the Roundhouse, London in 2023

Background information
- Born: Leslie Feist; February 13, 1976 (age 50); Amherst, Nova Scotia, Canada
- Origin: Calgary, Alberta, Canada
- Genres: Indie pop; folk; baroque pop
- Occupations: Musician; singer; songwriter
- Instruments: Vocals; guitar
- Years active: 1991–present
- Labels: Arts & Crafts; Cherrytree; Interscope
- Member of: Broken Social Scene
- Formerly of: By Divine Right
- Website: www.listentofeist.com

Leslie Feist (born February 13, 1976), known mononymously as Feist, is a Canadian indie pop singer and songwriter, performing both as a solo artist and as a member of the indie rock group Broken Social Scene.

Feist launched her solo music career in 1999 with the release of Monarch. Her subsequent studio albums, Let It Die, released in 2004, and The Reminder, released in 2007, were critically acclaimed and commercially successful, selling over 2.5 million copies. The Reminder earned Feist four Grammy nominations, including a nomination for Best New Artist. She has received 11 Juno Awards, including two Artist of the Year awards. Her fourth studio album, Metals, was released in 2011. In 2012, Feist collaborated on a split EP with metal group Mastodon, releasing an interactive music video in the process.

Feist has released six studio albums as of 2023. Feist received three Juno awards at the 2012 ceremony: Artist of the Year, Adult Alternative Album of the Year for Metals, and Music DVD of the Year for her documentary Look at What the Light Did Now. Additionally, she was nominated for four Grammy Awards including the Best Pop Vocal Album for The Reminder and Best New Artist.

== Early life ==
Leslie Feist was born on February 13, 1976, in Amherst, Nova Scotia, Canada. Her parents are both artists. Her father, Harold Feist, was an American-Canadian abstract expressionist painter who taught fine arts at Mount Allison University in Sackville, New Brunswick. Her mother, Lyn Feist, was a student of ceramics from Saskatchewan. After their first child, Ben, was born, the family moved to Sackville.

Feist is the niece of guitarist Dan Achen, who played in the 1990s rock band Junkhouse and had produced for numerous artists (Achen died in 2010 of a heart attack).

Feist's parents divorced soon after she was born, and Ben, Feist and their mother moved to Regina, Saskatchewan, where they lived with her grandparents. They later moved to Calgary, Alberta, where she attended Bishop Carroll High School as well as Alternative High School. She aspired to be a writer, and spent much of her youth singing in choirs. At the age of 12, Feist performed as one of 1,000 dancers in the opening ceremonies of the Calgary Winter Olympics, which she cites as inspiration for the video "1234."

As her father is American, Feist has dual Canadian–U.S. citizenship.

== Music career ==
In 1991, at the age of fifteen, Feist got her start in music when she founded, and was the lead vocalist for, a Calgary punk band called Placebo (not to be confused with the English band Placebo). She and her bandmates won a local Battle of the Bands competition and were awarded the opening slot at the festival Infest 1993, featuring the Ramones. At this concert, she met Brendan Canning, whose band hHead performed immediately before hers, and with whom she joined Broken Social Scene ten years later.

In 1995, Feist was forced to take time off from music to recover from vocal cord damage. She moved from Calgary to Toronto in 1996. Also in 1996, she was asked by Noah Mintz of hHead to play bass in his solo project Noah's Arkweld. She played the bass guitar in Noah's Arkweld for a year despite never having played bass before. In 1998, she became the rhythm guitarist for the band By Divine Right and toured with them throughout 1998, 1999, and 2000. She also played guitar for some live performances by Bodega, but was never an official member of the band. During this era, Feist also worked at The Rivoli and Lava Lounge, both popular Toronto music venues at the time.

In 1999, Feist moved into a Queen West apartment above Come As You Are with a friend of a friend, Merrill Nisker, who then began to perform as electro-punk musician Peaches. Feist worked the back of the stage at Peaches' shows, using a sock puppet and calling herself "Bitch Lap Lap". The two also toured together in England from 2000 to 2001, staying with Justine Frischmann of Elastica and MIA. Feist appeared as a guest vocalist on The Teaches of Peaches. Feist appears in Peaches' video for the song "Lovertits", suggestively rubbing and licking a bike. Later, Feist covered this song with Gonzales (whom she met while touring with Peaches) on her album Open Season. In 2006, Feist contributed backup vocals on a track entitled "Give 'Er", which appeared on Peaches' album Impeach My Bush.

=== Monarch (Lay Your Jewelled Head Down) (1999–2001) ===
Feist's solo debut album, Monarch, was released in 1999. It is composed of ten songs, including "Monarch" and "That's What I Say, It's Not What I Mean". The album was produced by Dan Kurtz, who would later form Dragonette.

=== Let It Die (2001–2006) ===
In the summer of 2001, Feist self-produced seven songs at home which she called The Red Demos, which have never been released commercially. She spent more than two years touring throughout Europe with Gonzales. In that same year she joined a group of old friends in forming a new version of Toronto indie rock group Broken Social Scene, adding vocals to many tracks after being forbidden to play guitar by de facto bandleader Kevin Drew. She subsequently recorded You Forgot It in People with the band. While on tour in Europe with Gonzales, they began recording new versions of her home-recorded Red Demos, which would later become her major label debut Let It Die. Let It Die featured both original compositions and covers. After the recording, Feist moved to Paris. While in Europe, she collaborated with Norwegian duo Kings of Convenience as co-writer and guest vocalist on their album Riot on an Empty Street, singing on "Know How" and "The Build Up". She also co-wrote and sang "The Simple Story" as a duet with Jane Birkin on her album Rendezvous.

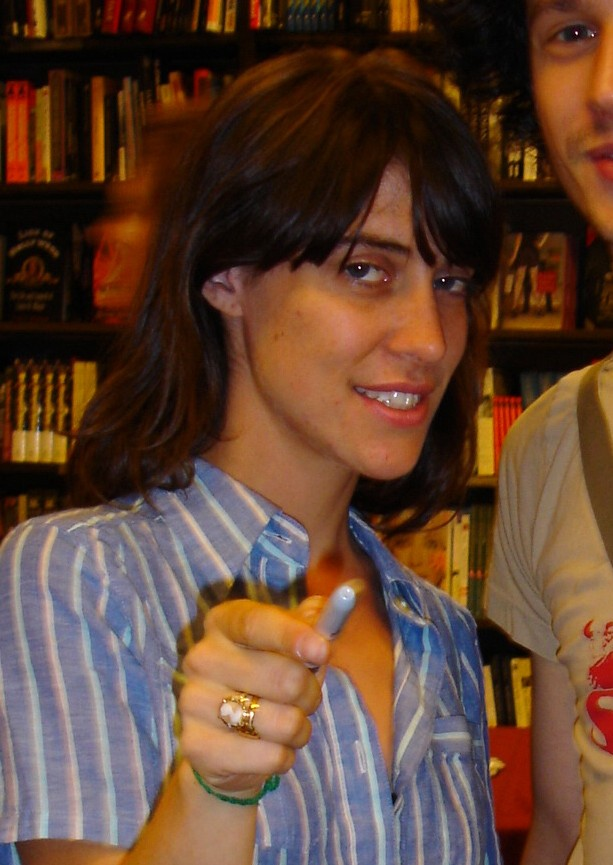
Feist in 2005

Feist toured during 2004, 2005, and 2006 through North America, Europe, Asia, and Australia supporting Let It Die. She won two Canadian Juno Awards for "Best New Artist" and "Best Alternative Rock Album" in 2004. Sales of Let It Die totaled 500,000 internationally, and she was awarded a platinum record in Canada, as well as a gold album in France. Fellow Canadian Buck 65 appeared in the Feist-directed music video for "One Evening", which was also nominated for Video of the Year at the 2004 Juno Awards.

In 2005, Feist contributed to the UNICEF benefit song "Do They Know It's Hallowe'en?" The track "Mushaboom" was used in an advertisement for a Lacoste men's fragrance, as well as in the film 500 Days of Summer. An album of remixes and collaborations, Open Season, was released on April 18, 2006. She lent her voice to the two tracks "La Même Histoire" and "We're All in the Dance" for the soundtrack to the 2006 film Paris, je t'aime.

=== The Reminder (2006–2007) ===
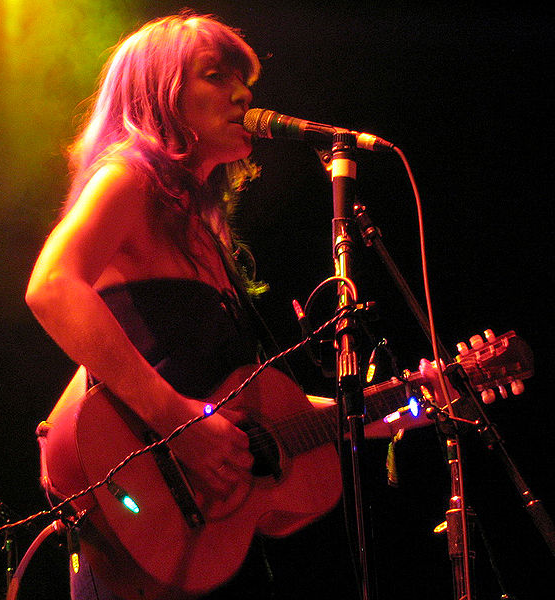
Feist performing in 2006

In early 2006, Feist moved to Paris, where she recorded a followup to Let It Die at LaFrette Studios with Gonzales, Mocky, Jamie Lidell, and Renaud Letang, as well as her touring band Bryden Baird, Jesse Baird, Julian Brown of Apostle of Hustle, and Afie Jurvanen of Paso Mino.

Feist's third solo album, The Reminder, was released on April 23, 2007, in Europe, and on May 1, 2007, in the rest of the world. She toured worldwide to promote the album. The album features "1234", a song co-written by New Buffalo's Sally Seltmann, that became a surprise hit after being featured in a commercial for the iPod nano, hitting No. 8 in the US, a rare feat for indie rock musicians and even more notable since it hit the Top Ten on the strength of downloads alone. She has been lauded in the press and was featured on the cover of the New York Times arts section in June 2007. The Reminder had sold worldwide over 1,000,000 copies and is certified gold in the U.S. The album also won a 2008 Juno Award for "Album of the Year" on April 6, 2008, in Calgary, Alberta.

Videos for many of the singles were directed by Patrick Daughters, who previously directed the video for "Mushaboom" and went on to direct "1234," "My Moon, My Man", and "I Feel It All". "1234" and "My Moon, My Man" were choreographed by the acclaimed choreographer and dancer Noemie Lafrance. The video for Honey, Honey features the work of avant-garde puppet troupe, The Old Trout Puppet Workshop.

"I Feel It All" was featured in the UK teen comedy The Inbetweeners and was used in the film The Accidental Husband. "Honey Honey" was featured in The L Word (episode 5.06, "Lights! Camera! Action!"). "I Feel It All" was featured in the 2008 film The Women. Popular German DJ Boys Noize remixed "My Moon, My Man", which appears on his 2007 debut album Oi Oi Oi. The DJ has also been known to close sets with the remix. In January 2009, Bon Iver played a cover of Feist's "The Park" from The Reminder on Australian radio's Triple J. The song "Limit to Your Love" was featured in season 2, episode 1 of British teen drama Skins, and was used in the film The Accidental Husband. A cover version of the song was released by UK singer-producer James Blake as a single from his 2011 self-titled album.

Prior to the airing of an Apple iPod nano commercial featuring this song, The Reminder was selling at approximately 6,000 copies per week, and "1234" at 2,000 downloads per week. Following the advertisement, the song passed 73,000 total downloads and reached No. 7 on Hot Digital Songs and No. 8 on the Billboard Hot 100; The Reminder jumped from No. 36 to No. 28 on the Billboard 200, with sales of 19,000.

Following the television advertisement for the iPod nano in the UK, the single beat its original chart position of 102 to become number 8 in the UK charts. Time magazine named "1234" one of The Ten Best Songs of 2007, ranking it at No. 2. Writer Josh Tyrangiel called the song a "masterpiece", praising Feist for singing it "with a mixture of wisdom and exuberance that's all her own". On April 6, 2008, Feist won a Juno Award for the single as "Single of the Year".

Feist performed an alternate version of "1234" on Sesame Street during its 39th season (2008), teaching children to count to the number four. She said working with the Muppets was a career highlight.

In 2009, Feist appeared in a short film directed by Broken Social Scene bandmate Kevin Drew that focused on her song "The Water". Feist appears alongside Cillian Murphy and David Fox in the silent role of "Mother". This film was streamed from Pitchfork.com for a week starting on March 2, 2009. In an interview with the site, Feist described the experience of being in this movie as "watching a movie while being in a movie."

=== Metals (2007–2013) ===
In 2007, Feist was placed No. 9 on Spinner.com's 2007 Women Who Rock Right Now. and named both Spin's and Blender's Breakout Artist of the Year. After taking Bob Wiseman on the road as her opening act in Europe she acted in his video Who Am I and joined him on drums for You Don't Love Me.

Feist was photographed by Annie Leibovitz for the November 2007 issue of Vanity Fair as part of a photo essay on folk music. On November 3 that year, she performed "1234" and "I Feel It All" on Saturday Night Live.

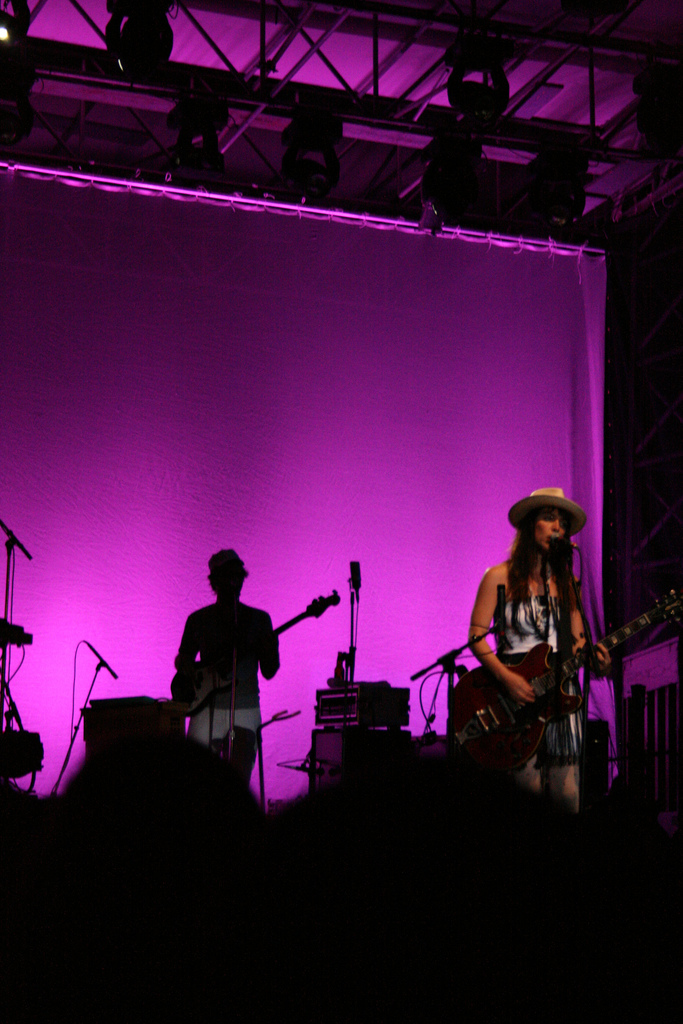
Feist live at the Festival d'été de Québec 2008 (Québec, Canada)

Feist was on the cover of the Spring 2008 edition of Naked Eye. On April 28, Feist was interviewed by Stephen Colbert. At the end of the show she performed "I Feel It All", while Colbert donned Feist's blue, sequined, strapless jumpsuit from the "1234" video. Feist joined Colbert again on his first-ever Christmas special, A Colbert Christmas: The Greatest Gift of All!, which first aired on November 23, 2008. She played an angel working for Heaven's overloaded phone (prayer) service. She also accompanied the Disko Bay Expedition of Cape Farewell. On October 20, 2008, she told The Canadian Press that, following the success of her last album, The Reminder, she felt she needed to step away from the pressures of the music industry to consider her next career move and "rest for a minute".

In March 2009, it was announced that she would make a guest appearance on the track "You and I" on Wilco's seventh album.

In 2009, Feist was featured in the CTV television film "My Musical Brain" with neuroscientist and writer Daniel Levitin, based on Levitin's bestselling book This Is Your Brain on Music.

Feist collaborated with Brooklyn band Grizzly Bear on the song "Service Bell" for the AIDS charity the Red Hot Organization. This song appears on Red Hot's album Dark Was the Night, and she joined the band in June 2009 during their Toronto show to sing this song and contribute backing vocals to the song "Two Weeks". She also collaborated with Ben Gibbard on a cover of Vashti Bunyan's "Train Song" for the same Dark Was the Night album.

In June 2009, she re-joined Broken Social Scene at a North by Northeast performance celebrating the launch of the band's biography entitled This Book Is Broken, in which she is prominently featured. This contradicted various rumors saying that it was unlikely Feist would ever play with the band again; this was the first of several appearances with BSS. She performed with Broken Social Scene during their concert of July 11, 2009, at Toronto's Harbourfront Centre, singing and playing guitar through most of the concert, as well as performing a medley of her solo songs with Kevin Drew and his solo songs. The concert was filmed by director Bruce Macdonald and released as This Movie Is Broken. She sings on Broken Social Scene's fourth studio album Forgiveness Rock Record. She performed with the band again in June 2010 on Olympic Island, and at the Sound Academy in Toronto on December 9 and 10, 2010.

Feist joined Beck, Wilco, Jamie Lidell, and James Gadson in a Los Angeles studio covering Skip Spence's Oar as part of Beck's Record Club series, with videos appearing on Beck's website beginning November 2009.

She also contributed vocals on Constant Companion the second album from Canadian songwriter Doug Paisley. Feist sings on the track "What I Saw" and the duet "Don't Make Me Wait". The album was released October 12, 2010.

Her song "Limit to Your Love" was covered by British post-dubstep artist James Blake and later remixed as a dubstep track by Benny Benassi and played to high acclaim at the 2011 Ultra Music Festival. I

On July 7, 2011, Feist with Radiohead's Colin Greenwood, Air's Nicolas Godin, The Hotrats and Soap&Skin performed The Velvet Underground and Nico's "Femme Fatale" at an all-star gig "The Velvet Underground Revisited" which took place in Cité de la Musique, Paris.

In 2011 Leslie Feist contributed two songs to Sarah Polley's film Take This Waltz: "Secret Heart" by Ron Sexsmith, and "Closing Time" by Leonard Cohen. Feist had a cameo in the 2011 movie The Muppets.

Her album Metals was released on September 30, 2011. Collaborators include Valgeir Sigurðsson, Chilly Gonzales, and Mocky. The album received widespread acclaim from music critics and appeared on the !earshot Campus and Community National Top 50 Albums chart in January 2012. Feist recorded Metals in a custom-built studio on a cliff in Big Sur, California.

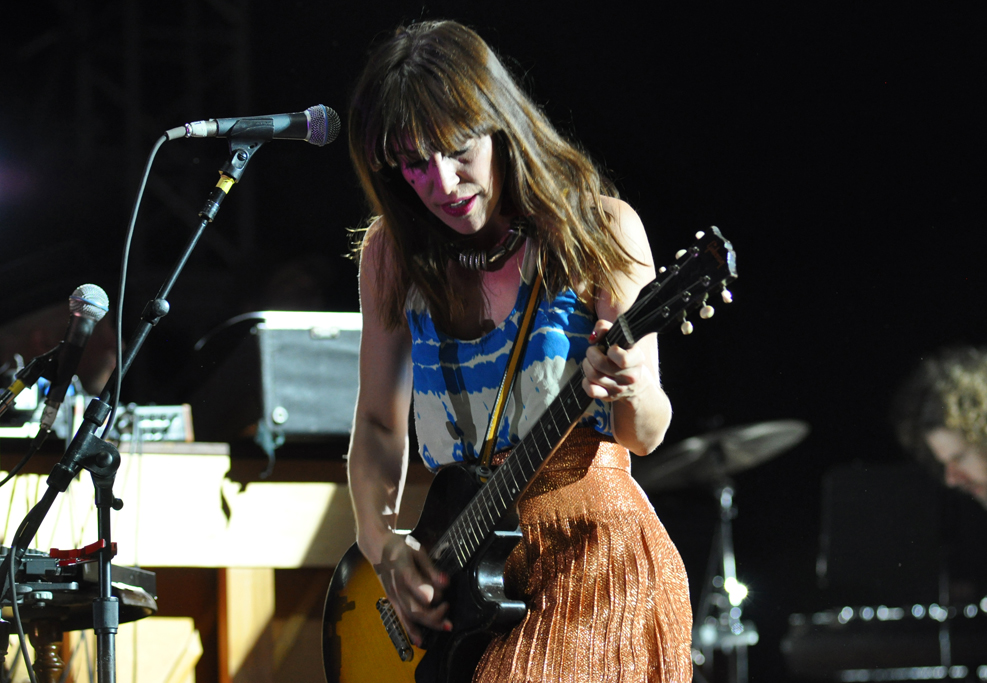
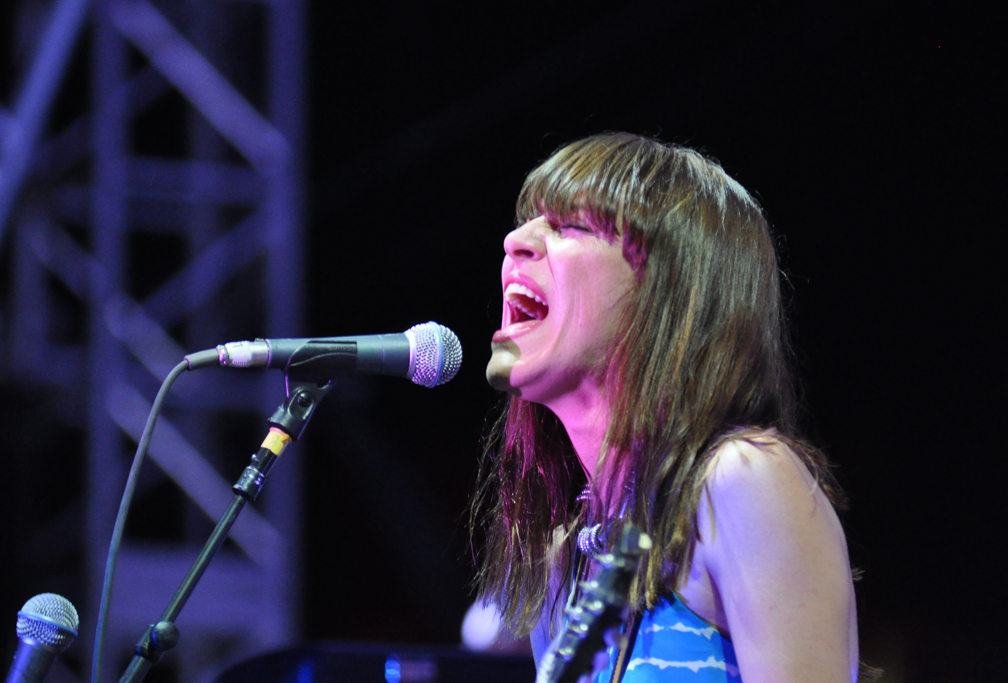
Feist at Coachella 2012

In 2012, Feist covered a song by the progressive metal band Mastodon, and they in turn covered one of hers, with both songs released on a split seven-inch on Record Store Day. They also released a crossfading interactive video for the track "A Commotion".

In 2012, she wrote the song "Fire in the Water" exclusively for the film The Twilight Saga: Breaking Dawn – Part 2. Her song "The Water" was covered on American jazz violinist Zach Brock's 2012 album Almost Never Was. In January 2013, it was announced Feist would headline, along with labelmate Broken Social Scene, the Arts & Crafts Field Trip Music Festival to commemorate the tenth anniversary of Arts & Crafts.

=== Look at What the Light Did Now and Pleasure (2013–2021) ===
In September 2010, Feist announced through her website the release of a documentary film about the creative process of making of The Reminder, called Look at What the Light Did Now. It was directed by Canadian film director Anthony Seck and was shot on Super 8 mm film. The film was released on DVD in December 2010, and a limited series of screenings were conducted including a Toronto screening at the Royal Ontario Museum, which featured a post-film interview of Feist by George Stroumboulopoulos. The film focuses on the recording of The Reminder as well as the development of the tour through puppetry and projection. The film includes interviews with band member Afie Jurvanen; producer Chilly Gonzales; Broken Social Scene bandmates Kevin Drew and Andrew Whiteman; and video director Patrick Daughters.

Bonus materials on the DVD include "This One Jam", an early performance of Feist with Gonzales at Trash Club; live performances from the Reminder tour; and two short films: "The Water" starring Feist and "Departures" starring Kevin Drew and based on an idea by Feist. A CD is also included that contains the documentary soundtrack (tracks from The Reminder re-interpreted and performed by Gonzales), live performances by Feist, as well as two versions of the title track, "Look at What the Light Did Now", one of which was recorded as a duet with the song's writer, American musician Kyle Field.

In April 2017, Feist released Pleasure, preceding it with the release of the title track "Pleasure" as a single in March 2017. On April 27, 2017, she introduced the album (a day ahead of its release) at Trinity St. Paul, Toronto. She performed the entire content of the album (in reverse order) as well as some of her earlier work including, "I Feel It All".

At the Juno Awards of 2021, Feist performed with the surviving members of The Tragically Hip on their 2002 single "It's a Good Life If You Don't Weaken", which marked the band's first televised performance since Gord Downie's death. In a promotional interview on CBC Radio's Q before the ceremony, the band stated that they agreed to perform specifically because Feist had been proposed as the vocalist, with Langlois stating that "OK, so that's not going to be some guy trying to sing like Gord or some guy trying not to sing like Gord. It was a 'no' until Feist came up."

=== Multitudes (2021–present) ===
In June 2021, Feist announced that her live Multitudes residency would begin in Europe in summer 2021. It included performances in Hamburg, Ottawa and Toronto, and featured new songs without the release of a new album. Initially intended to accompany the release of Pleasure, the style of Multitudes as a traditional, intimate and communal experience for smaller audiences was a concept that Feist and designer Rob Sinclair co-designed.

On September 1, 2022, Feist announced that she would withdraw from opening for Arcade Fire on their tour after their frontman Win Butler was accused of sexual misconduct.

On February 14, 2023, Feist released three new songs, "Hiding Out In The Open", "In Lightning" and "Love Who We Are Meant To", from her sixth studio album, Multitudes, announcing its scheduled release on April 14, 2023. In the same year, she appeared on Hayden's album Are We Good, as a duet vocalist on the single "On a Beach". Feist also announced a North American and European tour to promote Multitudes.

In 2025, Feist and Andrew Barr were the executive producer of two tracks of Argentine experimental musician Juana Molina's album Doga, which she recorded at the Hotel2Tango studio in Montreal.

In 2026, she was inducted into the Canadian Songwriters Hall of Fame.

== Personal life ==
Feist has one adopted daughter, who was born at the end of 2019.

== Discography ==
- Monarch (Lay Your Jewelled Head Down) (1999)
- Let It Die (2004)
- The Reminder (2007)
- Metals (2011)
- Pleasure (2017)
- Multitudes (2023)

== Filmography ==
List of television and films credits
Year	Title	Role	Notes
2007	Departures	Herself	Is in the process of filming the video for "My Moon My Man"; does not speak
2007	Saturday Night Live	Herself	"Brian Williams/Feist" (Season 33, Episode 4)
2007	Grey's Anatomy	Soundtrack	"Sealion Woman" (Season 3, Episode 22) "My Moon My Man" (Season 4, Episode 3)
2007	Gossip Girl	Soundtrack	"I Feel It All" (Season 1, Episode 3)
2008	Sesame Street	Herself	"The Golden Triangle of Destiny" (Season 39, Episode 1), performed an alternate version of "1234"
2008	A Colbert Christmas: The Greatest Gift of All!	Angel/Herself	
2009	The Musical Brain	Herself	Documentary
2009	In the Corner.	Herself	Documentary
2009	Burning Ice	Herself	Documentary
2009	Love Shines	Herself	Documentary
2009	The Water	The Mother	
2010	Ivory Tower	Unknown	
2010	Look at What The Light Did Now	Herself	
2011	The Muppets	Smalltown Resident	Performs "Life's A Happy Song" with Jason Segel, Amy Adams, "Walter" (Peter Linz), and Mickey Rooney
2011	Grey's Anatomy	Soundtrack	"How Come You Never Go There" (Season 8, Episode 8)
2011	Gossip Girl	Soundtrack	"The Bad In Each Other" (Season 5, Episode 8)
2012	Grey's Anatomy	Soundtrack	"Cicadas and Gulls" (Season 8, Episode 16) "Graveyard" (Season 8, Episode 23)
2012	Gossip Girl	Soundtrack	"Graveyard" (Season 5, Episode 16)
2012	The Twilight Saga: Breaking Dawn Part 2	Soundtrack	"Fire in the Water"
2017	Legion	Soundtrack	"The Undiscovered First" (Season 1, Episode 4)
2024	The Bachelor	Herself	"Week 6: Montreal" (Season 28, Episode 6)
2025	Heated Rivalry	Soundtrack	"Sealion Woman" (Season 1, Episode 1) "My Moon My Man" (Season 1, Episode 4)

== See also ==
- Music of Canada
- Canadian rock
- List of Canadian musicians
- List of bands from Canada
- Mononymous persons

Awards and achievements
Preceded by Michael Bublé	Juno Award for New Artist of the Year; 2005	Succeeded by Daniel Powter
Preceded by Nelly Furtado; Neil Young	Juno Award for Artist of the Year; 2008; 2012	Succeeded by Sam Roberts; Leonard Cohen
