= My Moon My Man =

Single by Feist

from the album The Reminder
- B-side: "The Water"
- Released: 6 March 2007
- Genre: Indie pop
- Length: 3:48
- Label: Cherrytree/Interscope, Arts & Crafts
- Songwriters: Gonzales; Feist
- Producers: Gonzales; Feist

Feist singles chronology
"Secret Heart" (2006)	"My Moon My Man" (2007)	"1234" (2007)

"My Moon My Man" is a song by Canadian singer-songwriter Feist, released as the first single from her album The Reminder (2007). The song was co-written by Feist and songwriter Chilly Gonzales.

"My Moon My Man" was used in a Verizon Wireless LG Chocolate commercial, and featured in the Grey's Anatomy episode "Let the Truth Sting". An extended version of the song was played during the montage at the beginning of the Heated Rivalry episode "Rose". The song is also featured in Season 2 of the Hulu series, Tell Me Lies.

A Boys Noize remix of the song was featured as a bonus track on his debut album Oi Oi Oi.

In 2026, it had a resurgence due to a cover by American artist, Finneas, that was performed at Feist's induction into the Canadian Music Hall of Fame. This lead to increased usage of the song on TikTok and other social media platforms.

== Music video ==
The video for "My Moon My Man" takes place in an airport at night. Feist steps onto a moving walkway, puts down her suitcase, and begins to dance as other travelers pass in and out of the frame. At times, the travelers dance as well. As the song progresses, the normal airport lighting changes to dramatic blue tinted lighting. When the song ends, the other travelers disappear, the lights come back on, and Feist picks up her suitcase and leaves the moving walkway.

The music video was shot in Toronto Pearson International Airport in the middle of the night. Because of the lighting, the beginning of the video had to be re-shot in the upstairs of a bar near the airport.

== Charts ==
Weekly chart performance for "My Moon My Man"
Chart (2007)	Peak position
Canada Hot 100 (Billboard)	13
Canada Hot AC (Billboard)	39
US Adult Alternative Airplay (Billboard)	8

2026 weekly chart performance for "My Moon My Man"
Chart (2026)	Peak position
Austria (Ö3 Austria Top 40)	71
Ireland (IRMA)	31
Lithuania (AGATA)	15
Netherlands (Single Tip)	3
Norway (IFPI Norge)	60
Sweden (Sverigetopplistan)	96
Switzerland (Schweizer Hitparade)	87
UK Singles (Official Charts)	29
US Hot Rock & Alternative Songs (Billboard)	23

== Certifications ==
Region	Certification	Certified units/sales
Canada (Music Canada)	Platinum	80,000^{‡}
United Kingdom (BPI)	Silver	200,000^{‡}
^{‡} Sales+streaming figures based on certification alone.
