= Mushaboom (song) =

Single by Feist

from the album Let It Die
- B-side: "When I Was A Young Girl" (VV Remix)
- Released: November 23, 2004
- Genre: Pop
- Length: 3:44
- Label: Cherrytree/Interscope, Arts & Crafts
- Songwriter(s): Feist
- Producer(s): Renaud Letang

Feist singles chronology
"Mushaboom" (2004)	"One Evening" (2004)

"Mushaboom" is the first single released by indie pop singer Feist from her album Let It Die. It was released November 23, 2004 by Universal International, and is Feist's second single released in Canada, after "Inside and Out". Feist performed the song live on Jimmy Kimmel Live! in January 2006 and appears on the 2008 compilation album, Northern Songs: Canada's Best and Brightest.

It also is part of the soundtrack of the movie 500 Days of Summer.

== Music videos ==
There are two music videos for this song. The first video starts off with clips of Feist in what appear to be canyons or some sort of mountainous region at sunset with clouds swirling around her. Scenes of Feist singing, as well as walking through a meadow, are shown. Then snowflake designs appear everywhere and they are removed to reveal the clouds, still at sunset. The last scenes are that of Feist dancing with her scarf, and the video ends.

The second video starts off with scenes of her bare feet in a town (which is not Mushaboom, Nova Scotia but Prague, Czech Republic), with people sitting around on top of cars and walking about in the street. The camera moves upwards through the window of an apartment, where Feist is shown sleeping. After putting some bread in a toaster, she goes to the mirror and draws a necklace on herself before realizing her toast is flying off. She chases the toast out of the window and glides through the sky, where a crowd is beginning to gather in the streets to watch her. She grabs a nearby man's acoustic guitar and begins to play, floating up into the sky again as the crowd starts to dance all around her. One woman in a pink shirt (Peaches) attempts to pull her back down, but she keeps floating back up; this repeats until finally Feist lets go of the guitar and it floats away. She dances with a man and then the rest of the crowd before running off, and enters a black rectangular box standing up. However, she is shown getting out of a white box before running toward a carousel and hopping onto a white horse that immediately becomes alive. It cuts to her riding the horse in the street, with the crowd following her (Peaches is among them, holding a devil's spear). Feist rides through an intersection and the crowd splits up in two different directions. Then the sky darkens, and Feist flies back into her window. The flying toast ducks back into the toaster as she heads through the apartment toward her bedroom. She falls into her mattress as a plant inside the room reaches into the lampshade and turns off the light.

This video was directed by Patrick Daughters.

== Remixes and covers ==
The song has been remixed by The Postal Service and Mocky on Open Season.

Rapper K-Os also remixed the song, beatboxing behind the vocals and adding a few verses of his own.

It was covered by Bright Eyes on the live album Motion Sickness, as well as on their tour to promote I'm Wide Awake, It's Morning.

Canadian jazz musician Laila Biali includes a cover on her album From Sea to Sky released: June 19, 2007.

The song was covered by Canadian a capella quartet Cadence on their 2018 album, "Home".

It's referenced in My Singing Monsters via a monster sporting the song's name that plays taiko drums and a tam-tam.

== Charts ==
Chart	Peak Position
UK Singles Chart	97
US Adult Alternative Songs (Billboard)	9

== Certifications ==
Region	Certification	Certified units/sales
Canada (Music Canada)	Gold	40,000^{‡}
^{‡} Sales+streaming figures based on certification alone.
