= Shame (soundtrack) =

Shame (Original Motion Picture Soundtrack)

Soundtrack album by various artists
- Released: 6 December 2011
- Genre: Electronic; jazz; funk; soul; blues; pop; classical; disco; acid jazz; smooth jazz; swing
- Length: 80:13
- Label: Sony Classical

Shame (Original Motion Picture Soundtrack) is the soundtrack album to the 2011 film Shame directed by Steve McQueen and starring Michael Fassbender and Carey Mulligan. The soundtrack was released through Sony Classical Records on 6 December 2011 and featured songs from Glenn Gould, Tom Tom Club, Blondie, Chic, John Coltrane, Chet Baker, Howlin' Wolf along with few original score themes composed by Harry Escott.

== Background ==
Shame features an original film score composed by Harry Escott. Escott revealed that his involvement was very set even before he came on board, and there were numerous pre-existing compositions ranging from classical to post-modern. Escott revealed that he had to compose two pieces of music that summarizes the soul of the protagonist Brandon, and which was not a traditional scoring, but capturing the mood of the piece and the urge within the protagonist. Escott noted on Steve's clarity about the musical landscape and environment he wanted the film to be in, where he demand pure orchestra and devoid of any synth music.

Editor Iain Canning noted that the theme represented of a ticking clock, reminiscent of the idea that Brandon had a process and a way of waking up, where life was a sort of a rotation. Canning liked the ticking clock aspect which served an importance in the film, attributing that the music would serve as a character. Besides the original compositions, which appeared only in few instances, the soundtrack primarily featured classical, periodic and contemporary film compositions, including a "New York, New York "Theme"" performed by Carey Mulligan.

== Reception ==
William Ruhlmann of AllMusic wrote "A viewing of Shame is required to understand how all this music works together, but the individual recordings are classics in their own right." Daniel Schweiger of AssignmentX wrote "A sex addict's greatest hits will do anything but turn you off". Calum Marsh of Coke Machine Glow wrote "Shame, despite what its detractors say, is a deceptively old-fashioned project, stylized and artful, and its soundtrack follows suit, offering style but sounding classically good as an album." Justin Chang of Variety described it a "resonant, largely cello-based score." Amy Biancolli of San Antonio Express-News called it a "disgruntled, murmuring strings" score. David Edelstein of Vulture described it a "plaintive drone of a score". Oliver Lyletton of IndieWire called it as one of the best soundtrack of 2011, saying "With "Shame," the images are cold and atmospheric, but never distant, thanks in part to Escott's stellar work."

== Track listing ==
No.	Title	Writer(s)	Artist	Length
1.	"Brandon"	Harry Escott	Harry Escott	8:28
2.	"Goldberg Variations, BWV 988: Aria"	Johann Sebastian Bach	Glenn Gould	3:04
3.	"Genius of Love"	Adrian Belew; Chris Frantz; Steven Stanley; Tina Weymouth	Tom Tom Club	3:26
4.	"Rapture"	Chris Stein; Deborah Harry	Blondie	5:32
5.	"I Want Your Love"	Bernard Edwards; Nile Rodgers	Chic	6:54
6.	"My Favorite Things"	Oscar Hammerstein II; Richard Rodgers	John Coltrane	13:39
7.	"New York, New York "Theme""	Fred Ebb; John Kander; Stephen Oremus (arrangements and production)	Carey Mulligan and Liz Caplan (piano)	4:55
8.	"Let's Get Lost"	Frank Loesser; Jimmy McHugh	Chet Baker	3:40
9.	"Prelude & Fugue No. 10 in E Minor, BWV 855: Prelude"	Bach	Glenn Gould	2:49
10.	"Goldberg Variations, BWV 988: Variation 15 a 1 Clav. Canone alla quinta. Andante"	Bach	Glenn Gould	5:00
11.	"Unravelling"	Escott	Harry Escott	9:35
12.	"You Can't Be Beat"	Chester Burnett	Howlin' Wolf	3:05
13.	"The Problem"	Mark Louque	Mark Louque	5:14
14.	"Prelude & Fugue No. 16 in G Minor, BWV 885: Praeludium"	Bach	Glenn Gould	3:09
15.	"End Credits"	Escott	Harry Escott	1:43
Total length:				80:13

== Accolades ==
In addition to the following awards, the score was shortlisted as one among the 97 contenders for the Best Original Score category at the 84th Academy Awards, albeit not receiving a final nomination.

Award	Date of ceremony	Category	Recipient(s) and nominee(s)	Result	Ref.
Black Reel Awards	12 February 2012	Outstanding Original Score	Harry Escott	Nominated	
Houston Film Critics Society	14 December 2011	Best Original Score	Harry Escott	Nominated	

== Personnel ==
Credits adapted from liner notes:

- David Butterworth – orchestration (1, 11, 15)
- Rolf Wilson – leader (1, 11, 15)
- Nick Wollage – engineering, recording, mixing (1, 11, 15)
- Pete Hutchings – assistant engineering (1, 11, 15)
- Manfred Melchior – mastering
- Ian Wood – score editor (1, 11, 15)
- Isobel Griffiths – orchestra contractor (1, 11, 15)
- Lucy Whalley – assistant orchestra contractor (1, 11, 15)
- White Label Productions – design
- Steve McQueen – liner notes
