= Dark Sneak Love Action =

Studio album by Tom Tom Club
- Released: May 1992
- Studio: Clubhouse
- Genre: Funk rock
- Length: 57:11
- Label: Sire/Reprise/Warner Bros. Records (U.S.); 26951
- Producer: Chris Frantz, Tina Weymouth, Bruce Martin, Mark Roule

Tom Tom Club chronology
Boom Boom Chi Boom Boom (1988)	Dark Sneak Love Action (1992)	The Good, the Bad, and the Funky (2000)

Professional ratings
Review scores
Source	Rating
AllMusic	2/5 stars
Robert Christgau	(choice cut)
The Encyclopedia of Popular Music	3/5 stars

Dark Sneak Love Action is the fourth studio album by Tom Tom Club, released in 1992. It includes the band's cover version of the Hot Chocolate track, "You Sexy Thing."

The album's final track, "Daddy Come Home," contains a sample of "Measure Up," a track from the band's 1983 album Close to the Bone.

== Critical reception ==
The Encyclopedia of Popular Music called the album "experimental" and "funky." Trouser Press deemed it a "thoroughly delightful and diverse multi-cultural exposition on easygoing, sexy pop rhythmotics."

Billboard called lead single "Sunshine and Ectasy" a "kinetic pop/dance gem."

== Track listing ==
All songs written by Tina Weymouth, Chris Frantz, Mark Roule and Bruce Martin except where noted.

1. "Love Wave" – 5:13
2. "Sunshine and Ecstasy" – 5:09
3. "You Sexy Thing" (Errol Brown, Tony Wilson) – 3:46
4. "Who Wants an Ugly Girl?" – 4:54
5. "Say I Am" – 4:54
6. "Irresistible Party Dip" – 5:11
7. "Dark Sneak Love Action" – 4:21
8. "Innocent Sex Kiss" – 4:00
9. "Dogs in the Trash" – 4:28
10. "My Mama Told Me" – 4:33
11. "As the Disco Ball Turns" – 5:48
12. "Daddy Come Home" (Frantz, Martin, Dougie Pincock, Roule, Weymouth) – 5:27

== Personnel ==
Tom Tom Club

- Tina Weymouth – bass guitar, vocals
- Chris Frantz – drums, percussion, vocals
- Lani Weymouth, Victoria Clamp – vocals
- Mark Roule – guitar, vocals
- Bruce Martin – computer programming, percussion, keyboards, accordion, vocals
