= Under the Boardwalk =

1964 single by the Drifters

Single by the Drifters
- B-side: "I Don't Want to Go On Without You"
- Released: June 1964
- Recorded: May 21, 1964
- Studio: Atlantic (New York City)
- Genre: Pop-soul
- Length: 2:45
- Label: Atlantic
- Songwriters: Kenny Young, Arthur Resnick
- Producer: Bert Berns

The Drifters singles chronology
"One Way Love" (1964)	"Under the Boardwalk" (1964)	"I've Got Sand in My Shoes" (1964)

"Under the Boardwalk" is a pop song written by Kenny Young and Arthur Resnick and recorded by the Drifters in 1964. It charted at number four on the Billboard Hot 100 chart on August 22, 1964. The song has since been covered by many other artists, with versions by Bette Midler, Sam & Dave, Tom Tom Club, the Rolling Stones, Billy Joe Royal, the Beach Boys, Bruce Willis, Bad Boys Blue, John Mellencamp and Lynn Anderson all charting in the United States or overseas. The song ranked number 487 on Rolling Stone's list of The 500 Greatest Songs of All Time in 2004 and number 489 in 2010.

== Premise ==
The lyric describes a tryst between a man and his beloved in a seaside town, who plan to privately meet "out of the sun" and out of sight from everyone else under a boardwalk. The instrumentation includes güiro, triangle and violins. The song's chorus switches from a major to minor key. The opening line of the song references The Drifters' prior hit "Up on the Roof." Also, the violins play the riff of "Up on the Roof" before the chorus.

== History ==
The song was set to be recorded on May 21, 1964, but the Drifters' lead singer, Rudy Lewis, died of a suspected heroin overdose the night before. Lewis had sung lead on most of their hits since the 1960 departure of Ben E. King, including "Up on the Roof". Rather than reschedule the studio session, the lead on "Under the Boardwalk" was given to the group's other lead vocalist, Johnny Moore, who had returned to the group in April 1963. The personnel on that recording included Ernie Hayes on piano, Everett Barksdale, Bill Suyker and Bob Bushnell on guitar, Milt Hinton on bass, Gary Chester on drums and George Devens on percussion. The arranger was Teacho Wiltshire. The last-minute move was a success, as the single, released on Atlantic Records, went to number four on the Billboard Hot 100 charts and number one for three non-consecutive weeks on Cashbox magazine's R&B chart.

In 2014, this recording of the song was inducted into the Grammy Hall of Fame.

== Cover versions ==
"Under the Boardwalk"

Single by the Rolling Stones

from the album 12 × 5 (US) and The Rolling Stones No. 2 (UK)
- B-side: "Walking the Dog"
- Released: January 1965 (AUS)
- Recorded: 1964
- Genre: Rock and roll, rhythm and blues
- Length: 2:48
- Label: Decca
- Songwriters: Kenny Young, Arthur Resnick
- Producer: Andrew Loog Oldham

The Rolling Stones singles chronology
"Route 66" (1965)	"Under the Boardwalk" (1965)	"The Last Time" (1965)

"Under the Boardwalk"

Single by Tom Tom Club

from the album Tom Tom Club
- Released: 1982
- Length: 3:03
- Label: Island
- Songwriters: Kenny Young, Arthur Resnick
- Producers: Steve Stanley, Tina Weymouth, Chris Frantz

Tom Tom Club singles chronology
"Genius of Love" (1981)	"Under the Boardwalk" (1982)	"The Man with the Four Way Hips" (1983)

"Under the Boardwalk"

Single by Bruce Willis

from the album The Return of Bruno
- Released: May 1987
- Length: 3:03
- Label: Motown
- Songwriters: Kenny Young, Arthur Resnick
- Producer: Robert Kraft

Bruce Willis singles chronology
"Respect Yourself" (1987)	"Under the Boardwalk" (1987)	"Secret Agent Man" (1987)

"Under the Boardwalk"

Single by Lynn Anderson

from the album What She Does Best
- B-side: "Turn the Page"
- Released: July 1988
- Genre: Country; country pop
- Length: 4:19
- Label: Mercury
- Songwriters: Kenny Young, Arthur Resnick
- Producers: Michael Clark, Jerry Kennedy, Nelson Larkin

Lynn Anderson singles chronology
"Read Between the Lines" (1987)	"Under the Boardwalk" (1988)	"What He Does Best" (1988)

"Under the Boardwalk"

Song by the Untouchables

from the album Agent Double 0 Soul
- Released: 1988
- Recorded: 1964
- Studio: Lotek Studio
- Genre: Soul, Ska, Mod Revival
- Length: 3:48
- Label: Twist
- Songwriters: Kenny Young, Arthur Resnick
- Producer: Arthur Barrow

A cover of this song by the Rolling Stones was released the same year as the original version. Their version was released as a single only in Australia, South Africa and Rhodesia, and peaked at No. 1 in the first two (the song was the band's first No. 1 hit in Australia) and at No. 2 in Rhodesia. It appeared on their albums 12 × 5 and The Rolling Stones No. 2. In 2007, it was included on the album Rhythms del Mundo Classics.

In 1966, Los Apson released a Spanish-language version titled "Fue en un Café" on their album No Hay Amor, which was a hit in Latin America, reaching the top 5 in Mexico.

"Under the Boardwalk" has since been covered by many artists, including the Northern Irish punk rock band The Undertones (on their 1980 album Hypnotised), Bette Midler on the 1988 Beaches soundtrack (number 26 in Australia), and the Tom Tom Club on their self-titled album (whose version reached number 22 on the UK Singles Chart in 1982, becoming the first version of the song to chart in Britain). Versions by Billy Joe Royal in 1978, Bruce Willis on his 1987 album The Return of Bruno (a number 2 success in the UK), and Lynn Anderson on her 1988 album What She Does Best (number 24 on the Country chart) all reached the Billboard charts. Rickie Lee Jones also covered the song for her 1983 EP Girl at Her Volcano.

John Mellencamp released the track as the B-side of his single "R.O.C.K. in the U.S.A.". In Australia, the single effectively became a double-A side when the B-side "Under the Boardwalk" received significant airplay and both tracks were listed together on the singles chart, reaching number 18. The track also reached number 19 on the Billboard Top Rock Tracks chart.

Afroman used the tune of "Boardwalk" for his 2022 protest song "Lemon Pound Cake", which served as the title track for his 18th studio album.

== Charts ==
=== Weekly charts ===
The Drifters version

Chart (1964)	Peak position
Australia (Kent Music Report)	7
Canada Top Singles (RPM)	5
New Zealand (Lever)	6
UK Singles (OCC)	45
US Billboard Hot 100	4
US Cash Box Top 100	5
US Cash Box R&B	1

The Rolling Stones version

Chart (1965)	Peak position
Australia (Kent Music Report)	1
Rhodesia	2
South Africa	1

Billy Joe Royal version

Chart (1978)	Peak position
Canada Top Singles (RPM)	74
US Billboard Hot 100	82

Tom Tom Club version

Chart (1982)	Peak position
Austria	6
Belgium	3
Ireland (IRMA)	17
Italy	42
Netherlands	9
New Zealand (RIANZ)	3
UK Singles (OCC)	22
US Billboard Dance Club Songs	31

John Mellencamp version

Chart (1986)	Peak position
Australia (Kent Music Report) with "R.O.C.K. in the U.S.A"	18
US Top Rock Tracks (Billboard)	19

Bruce Willis version

Chart (1987)	Peak position
UK Singles (OCC)	2
US Billboard Hot 100	59
US Adult Contemporary (Billboard)	20

Lynn Anderson version

Chart (1988)	Peak position
US Billboard Hot Country Songs	24

Bette Midler version

Chart (1989)	Peak position
Australia (ARIA)	26

=== Year-end charts ===
The Drifters version

Chart (1964)	Rank
US Billboard Hot 100	20
US Cash Box	21

Bruce Willis version

Chart (1987)	Position
UK Singles (OCC)	12

== See also ==
- 1964 in music
- Afroman#Raid on Ohio home
