= Boom Boom Chi Boom Boom =

Studio album by Tom Tom Club
- Released: 1988
- Studio: Compass Point, Nassau, Bahamas; Sigma Sound, New York City
- Genre: New wave
- Length: 39:40
- Label: Sire; Reprise; Warner Bros. (U.S.); Fontana; Polygram (UK)
- Producer: Chris Frantz; Tina Weymouth; Arthur Baker

Tom Tom Club chronology
Close to the Bone (1983)	Boom Boom Chi Boom Boom (1988)	Dark Sneak Love Action (1991)

Singles from Boom Boom Chi Boom Boom
- 1. "Don't Say No" Released: 1988; 2. "Suboceana" Released: 1988; 3. "Call of the Wild" Released: 1989

Professional ratings
Review scores
Source	Rating
AllMusic	2/5 stars
Robert Christgau	C+
The Encyclopedia of Popular Music	2/5 stars
Los Angeles Times	3/5 stars
MusicHound Rock: The Essential Album Guide	3/5 stars
The Rolling Stone Album Guide	2.5/5 stars

Boom Boom Chi Boom Boom is the third studio album by Tom Tom Club, released in 1988. It includes a cover version of the Velvet Underground's "Femme Fatale", with David Byrne, Lou Reed, and Jerry Harrison. The track "Suboceana" was released as a single in the UK in late 1988 and received some radio airplay. In the US, a 12-inch (5 track maxi) single of the song was released, which featured a remix by Marshall Jefferson, and contains the track "Devil, Does Your Dog Bite". That song is a bonus (track 11) on the Japanese issue of the album that has the original 10 songs (like the European 1988 issue). The track "Don't Say No" was released as a single in the UK, Europe, and Australia. The 7" version was remixed by Tuta Aquino and various 12" releases included acid house remixes by Marshall Jefferson. "Challenge of the Love Warriors" is played over the ending credits of Mary Lambert's 1987 mystery thriller Siesta though it is not included on the soundtrack album, also released in 1987, from Miles Davis and Marcus Miller.

== Production ==
The band began working on the album in 1986, and eventually spent two months recording it.

== Critical reception ==
Trouser Press preferred the US version of the album, writing that it "is as much fun for as deep as you care to listen." The Rolling Stone Album Guide called the album "forced" and "hollow-sounding." The Los Angeles Times called it "a fluffy funkasonic fun house that serves as a fine complement to the Heads’ more arty melanges." The Rough Guide to Rock deemed the songs "polite white soul arrangements."

== Track listing ==
All songs written by Tina Weymouth and Chris Frantz, except where noted.

1. "Suboceana" (Tina Weymouth, Frantz, Laura Weymouth) – 4:53
2. "Shock the World" – 3:51
3. "Don't Say No" – 4:30
4. "Challenge of the Love Warriors" (Frantz) – 3:07
5. "Femme Fatale" (Lou Reed) – 2:48
6. "Born for Love" – 4:24
7. "Broken Promises" – 3:45
8. "She Belongs to Me" (Bob Dylan) – 4:03
9. "Little Eva" – 4:00
10. "Mighty Teardrop" (Tina Weymouth, Frantz, Laura Weymouth) – 4:13

=== US/Canada (1989) track listing ===
The album was heavily revised for issue in the US and Canada. Three tracks of the original 1988 issue were dropped ("Born for Love", "Broken Promises" and "Mighty Teardrop"), while four new tracks were added ("Call of the Wild", "Kiss Me When I Get Back", "Wa Wa Dance" and "I Confess").

1. "Call of the Wild" (Tina Weymouth, Frantz, Mark Roule, Gary Pozner) mixed by Gary Wilkinson
2. "Kiss Me When I Get Back" (Tina Weymouth, Frantz, Mark Roule, Gary Pozner) mixed by Louis Scalise
3. "Wa Wa Dance" (Tina Weymouth, Frantz, Mark Roule, Gary Pozner) mixed by Gary Wilkinson
4. "I Confess" (Tina Weymouth, Frantz, Mark Roule, Gary Pozner) mixed by David Sussman
5. "Challenge of the Love Warriors"
6. "Suboceana"
7. "Don't Say No"
8. "Shock the World"
9. "Little Eva"
10. "Femme Fatale"
11. "She Belongs to Me" (on CD version only) mixed by Mark Roule

== Personnel ==
- Tina Weymouth – bass, keyboards, rhythm guitar, vocals; harmonium on "Femme Fatale"
- Chris Frantz – drums, keyboards, percussion, front cover painting
- Mark Roule – guitar, backing vocals
- Gary Pozner – keyboards, drum programming, percussion, backing vocals
- Laura Weymouth – backing vocals
- Wally Badarou – Synclavier on "Challenge of the Love Warriors" and Bell keyboards on "Broken Promises"
- Steve Scales – bongos, percussion on "Challenge of the Love Warriors"
- Jerry Harrison – keyboards, backing vocals on "Femme Fatale"
- Lou Reed – guitar, backing vocals on "Femme Fatale"
- David Byrne – guitar, backing vocals on "Femme Fatale"
- Eddie Martinez – guitar on "Born for Love"
- Jay Berliner – Spanish guitar on "Broken Promises"
- Glenn Rosenstein – rhythm guitar on "Born for Love", keyboards on "She Belongs to Me"
- Heidi Berg – violin on "Little Eva"
- Coco Arnesen Roule – vocals on "Call of the Wild"
- Tiny Valentine – vocals on "Wa Wa Dance"

Technical

- Glenn Rosenstein – engineer, mixing
- Mark Roule and Steven Stanley – additional engineer

== Chart performance ==
The album spent 11 weeks on the U.S. Billboard album charts and reached its peak position of #114 in May 1989.
