= Die Monster Die =

Die Monster Die may refer to:

== Film ==
- Die, Monster, Die!, 1965 British-American horror directed by Daniel Haller; British title Monster of Terror
- Die, Monster, Die, 2018 Argentine drama; distributed as Murder Me, Monster; original title Muere, Monstruo, Muere

== Music ==
- Die Monster Die, American grunge band fronted by Alice Cohen#Musical history; active 1987–1995
- DieMonsterDie, American horror punk band based in Salt Lake City; founded in 1995 as Casa Diablo
