= The Good, the Bad, and the Funky =

Studio album by Tom Tom Club
- Released: 12 September 2000
- Genre: New wave
- Label: Rykodisc
- Producers: Chris Frantz, Tina Weymouth

Tom Tom Club chronology
Dark Sneak Love Action (1991)	The Good, the Bad, and the Funky (2000)	Downtown Rockers (2012)

Professional ratings
Review scores
Source	Rating
Allmusic	3.5/5 stars

The Good, The Bad, and the Funky is the fifth studio album of the Tom Tom Club. A remix of the album's second track, "Who Feelin' It?", was featured in the 2000 dark comedy American Psycho as the "Philip's Psycho Mix".

== Track listing ==
All tracks composed by Chris Frantz and Tina Weymouth; except where indicated

1. "Time to Bounce"
2. "Who Feelin' It?"
3. "Happiness Can't Buy Money"
4. "Holy Water" (Frantz, Weymouth, Charles Pettigrew)
5. "Soul Fire" (Lee Perry)
6. "She's Dangerous"
7. "She's a Freak"
8. "(C'Mon) Surrender" (Frantz, Weymouth, Charles Pettigrew)
9. "Love to Love You Baby" (Donna Summer, Giorgio Moroder, Pete Bellotte)
10. "Superdreaming"
11. "Lesbians by the Lake" (Frantz, Weymouth, Abdou M'Boup)
12. "Let There Be Love" (Frantz, Weymouth, Charles Pettigrew)
13. "Time to Bounce" (Dubbed version)
14. "Dangerous Dub"

== Personnel ==
- Bernie Worrell – organ, clavinet
- Chris Frantz – drums, percussion, keyboards, loops, vocals
- Toots Hibbert – vocals
- Abdou M'Boup – percussion, kora
- Doug McKean – mixing, sample arrangements
- James Rizzi – artwork
- Steve Scales – mixing, conga
- Tina Weymouth – organ, synthesizer, synthesizer bass, piano, acoustic guitar, bass, vocals
- Bruce Martin – keyboards
- Charles Pettigrew – vocals
- Robby Aceto – electric guitar, guitar effects
- Sergio Rotman – electric guitar, saxophone
- Mystic Bowie – toasting
