= Wordy Rappinghood =

1981 single by Tom Tom Club

Single by Tom Tom Club

from the album Tom Tom Club
- B-side: "Elephant" (UK); "Spooks" (US)
- Released: 1981 (UK); May 1982 (US)
- Genre: Funk; new wave; hip hop
- Length: 6:27
- Label: Sire; Warner Bros.; Island; PolyGram (outside US)
- Songwriters: Tina Weymouth; Lani Weymouth; Laura Weymouth; Chris Frantz; Steven Stanley
- Producers: Steven Stanley; Tina Weymouth; Chris Frantz

Tom Tom Club singles chronology
"Wordy Rappinghood" (1981)	"Genius of Love" (1981)

Audio
- "Wordy Rappinghood" on YouTube

"Wordy Rappinghood" is the debut single by American new wave band Tom Tom Club, from their 1981 self-titled debut album. It uses part of a traditional Moroccan children's song and game, "A Ram Sam Sam", made popular by the 1971 Rolf Harris recording. In the United States, the song topped the Billboard Disco Top 80 chart along with "Genius of Love".

== Structure, instrumentation and production ==
The song opens with the sound of a typewriter and features jarring synthesizer chords and a distinctive drum break. The words of the fifth verse are spoken in French: "Mots pressés, mots sensés, mots qui disent la vérité, mots maudits, mots mentis, mots qui manquent le fruit d'esprit" which translate as: "hurried words, sensible words, words that tell the truth, cursed words, lying words, words that lack the fruit of the mind."

Tina Weymouth and Chris Frantz had relocated to Nassau, Bahamas. A neighbor, Chris Blackwell, owner of Island Records, invited them to record at his Compass Point Studios. Frantz and Weymouth co-opted Steven Stanley, a keyboard player who had worked as the sound engineer on Ian Dury's album Lord Upminster, and Monte Browne, a bass player formerly with T-Connection.

== Track listings ==
- US 12" single

A. "Wordy Rappinghood" (Special 12" Version) – 6:39
B. "Spooks" – 6:28

- European 7" single

A. "Wordy Rappinghood" – 3:50
B. "Wordy Rappinghood" (You Don't Ever Stop) – 4:05

- European 12" single

A. "Wordy Rappinghood" (Remix) – 6:42
B. "Elephant" – 5:11

== Chart performance ==
=== Weekly charts ===
Weekly chart performance for "Wordy Rappinghood"
Chart (1981–1982)	Peak position
Australia (Kent Music Report)	44
Belgium (Ultratop 50 Flanders)	1
France (IFOP)	9
Ireland (IRMA)	10
Netherlands (Dutch Top 40)	2
Netherlands (Single Top 100)	2
New Zealand (Recorded Music NZ)	35
Spain (AFYVE)	3
UK Singles (Official Charts)	7
US Billboard Bubbling Under the Hot 100	102
US Billboard Disco Top 80	1

=== Year-end charts ===
Year-end chart performance for "Wordy Rappinghood"
Chart (1981)	Position
Belgium (Ultratop Flanders)	17
Netherlands (Dutch Top 40)	32
Netherlands (Single Top 100)	64

== Chicks on Speed version ==
"Wordy Rappinghood"

Single by Chicks on Speed

from the album 99 Cents
- Released: 2003
- Length: 6:26
- Label: Chicks on Speed
- Songwriters: Tina Weymouth; Chris Frantz; Steven Stanley
- Producer: Glove

Chicks on Speed singles chronology
"We Don't Play Guitars" (2003)	"Wordy Rappinghood" (2003)	"Flame On" (2004)

Music video
- "Wordy Rappinghood" on YouTube

"Wordy Rappinghood" was covered by German electroclash group Chicks on Speed and released as the second single from their album 99 Cents in 2003. Their version featured guest vocals by other female musicians such as Miss Kittin, Kevin Blechdom, Le Tigre, Adult.'s Nicola Kuperus, and Tom Tom Club founding member Tina Weymouth.

This cover was sampled in the song "Really Rappin' Something" by the Kleptones from the album From Detroit to J.A. in 2005. In 2007, the Playgroup remix of Chicks on Speed's version appeared on the compilation album FabricLive.33 by Spank Rock.

=== Critical reception ===
Christopher Lloyd of Drowned in Sound described the song as an "ultra-catchy seven minute dancefloor killer".

=== Track listings ===
- European CD maxi single
1. "Wordy Rappinghood" (Radio Edit) – 4:20
2. "Wordy Rappinghood" (The Playgroup Remix) – 5:23
3. "Wordy Rappinghood" (Dave Clarke's Non Techno Mix) – 3:37
4. "Wordy Rappinghood" (The Playgroup Instrumental Mix) – 5:24
5. "Wordy Rappinghood" (music video)
- German 12" single

A1. "Wordy Rappinghood" (Album Mix) – 6:26
A2. "Wordy Rappinghood" (Acapella Version) – 4:10
B1. "Wordy Rappinghood" (The Playgroup Remix) – 5:23
B2. "Wordy Rappinghood" (Dave Clarke's Non Techno Mix) – 3:37

=== Charts ===
Weekly chart performance for "Wordy Rappinghood" by Chicks on Speed
Chart (2003–2004)	Peak position
Belgium Dance (Ultratop Flanders)	5
Scottish Singles Sales (Official Charts)	72
UK Singles (Official Charts)	66
UK Dance (Official Charts)	4

== Uffie version ==
"Wordy Rappinghood"

Single by Uffie
- Released: 2011
- Length: 3:08
- Label: Ed Banger; Because; Elektra
- Songwriters: Tina Weymouth; Chris Frantz; Steven Stanley
- Producer: DJ Mehdi

Uffie singles chronology
"Difficult" (2010)	"Wordy Rappinghood" (2011)	"Drugs" (2018)

French-American singer Uffie covered the song in 2011. The single, produced by labelmate DJ Mehdi, was released on April 18, 2011, through Ed Banger Records, Because Music and Elektra Records. Her version was used in a global Evian ad campaign.

== See also ==
- List of number-one dance singles of 1982 (U.S.)
- List of number-one hits (Belgium)
