= The Vels =

- Also known as: Vels
- Origin: Philadelphia, Pennsylvania, U.S.
- Genres: New wave; synth-pop
- Years active: 1980–1987
- Labels: Mercury; PolyGram
- Past members: Alice Cohen (as Alice Desoto); Charles Hanson; Chris Larkin (deceased)

The Vels was an American new wave and synth-pop band formed in Philadelphia, Pennsylvania in 1980. The band consisted of lead vocalist and keyboardist Alice Cohen (as Alice Desoto), bassist and guitarist Charles Hanson, and keyboardist and LinnDrum programmer Chris Larkin.

== Career ==
The Vels began when Charles Hanson, former member of the 1970s New Orleans punk rock band, the Normals, invited Chris Larkin and Alice Desoto to join him for a show at the now defunct Love Club in Philadelphia. The band used low tech synthesizers, drum machines, and bass guitar. The Philadelphia Inquirer music critic, Lee Paris was there, and wrote a positive review. The Vels were a prominent fixture on the Philadelphia music scene of the early 1980s. They caught the attention of Mercury Records and signed a recording contract with them.

The Vels' debut studio album, Velocity (1984), was recorded at Compass Point Studios in Nassau, Bahamas with producer Steven Stanley, known for his work with Tom Tom Club. Chris Larkin had left sometime before their second studio album, House of Miracles (1986), and it was recorded without him, this time with production by Steve Levine, known for his work with Culture Club.

A music video for their song "Look My Way" was filmed in London, England, and became popular during the early days of MTV.

In 1986, the Vels toured the U.S. as the opening act for English rock band the Psychedelic Furs, but disbanded in 1987.

Keyboardist and singer, Chris Larkin, died from complications due to pneumonia, on November 21, 2007.

== Discography ==
Studio albums

- Velocity (1984)
- House of Miracles (1986)

Singles

- "Private World" / "Hieroglyphics" (1984)
- "Look My Way" / "Tell Me Something" (1984)
- "Girl Most Likely To" (1986)
