= Velocity (album) =

Studio album by the Vels
- Released: 1984
- Recorded: February–March 1983
- Studios: Compass Point (Nassau, Bahamas); Park South (New York City)
- Genres: New wave; synth-pop
- Length: 32:49
- Labels: Mercury; PolyGram
- Producers: Steven Stanley; Peter Lubin

The Vels chronology
Velocity (1984)	House of Miracles (1986)

Singles from Velocity
- 1. "Look My Way" Released: 1984; 2. "Private World" Released: 1984

Velocity is the debut studio album by American new wave and synth-pop band the Vels, released in 1984 by Mercury Records and PolyGram. Whilst the album itself failed to chart, it featured two songs that charted on the U.S. Billboard Dance Club Songs chart, with "Hieroglyphics" peaking at No. 30 and "Look My Way" peaking at No. 39. "Look My Way" also peaked at No. 72 on the U.S. Billboard Hot 100, their only showing on that chart.

To date, the album remains unavailable on CD, and it has been out of print since its initial release on vinyl and cassette. However, in 2023 Vels' founding member Charles Hanson made Velocity available for streaming, and as a digital download on Amazon Music, and the iTunes Store, with a rearranged track listing, and two bonus tracks.

== Recording ==
It was principally recorded at Compass Point Studios in Nassau, Bahamas, with producer Steven Stanley, known for his work with Tom Tom Club, whereas "Secret Garden" was produced by their A&R representative Peter Lubin at Park South Studios in New York City. When reflecting on the recording of the album, lead vocalist Alice Cohen said, "the whole Compass Point thing was great. We were unassuming Philly folks, living in cheap apartments, suddenly in this amazing studio in the Bahamas. It was very surreal."

The album was principally recorded by the three band members alone, without the use of any live drums. Instead Chris Larkin used the LinnDrum drum machine, with each member playing percussion, and Chuck Sabo providing additional percussion. Sanford Ponder was also brought in to program the digital sampling synthesizer the Fairlight CMI on certain tracks, and it can be heard most prominently on "Can't You Hear Me?".

== Critical reception ==
Professional ratings
Review scores
Source	Rating
AllMusic	4.5/5 stars
Robert Christgau	B+

Music journalist Robert Christgau gave the album a B+, and stated that "These three Steven Stanley-produced Philadelphians don't just dance in their heads. Not only do they command the spare formal pop eloquence that many popdance minimalists claim and few get next to, they have a generous regard for pop pleasure. Their simple hooks add up to full-fledged tunes, their basic-English lyrics are more than runes. And singer Alice DeSoto is unaffected and vivacious, a rare combination."

== Track listing ==
All songs are written by Alice Desoto, Charles Hansen and Chris Larkin.

Side one

1. "Tell Me Something" – 3:23
2. "Secret Garden" – 3:39
3. "Can't You Hear Me?" – 3:54
4. "Coming Attractions" – 4:21

Side two

5. "Look My Way" – 4:38
6. "Day After Day" – 3:14
7. "Private World" – 4:30
8. "Hieroglyphics" – 5:10

== Personnel ==
Credits are adapted from the Velocity liner notes.

The Vels

- Alice Cohen (as Alice Desoto) — vocals; keyboards; percussion
- Charles Hanson — bass guitar; keyboards; vocals; percussion; guitar
- Chris Larkin — keyboards; vocals; LinnDrum; percussion

Additional musicians

- Sanford Ponder — Fairlight CMI programming
- Chuck Sabo — additional percussion

Production and artwork

- Steven Stanley – producer; engineer
- Benjamin Armbrister – assistant producer
- Peter Lubin – producer (track 2)
- Bruce Tergensen – engineer
- Mark Procopio – assistant engineer
- Jeff Levy – assistant engineer; assistant mixer
- Howie Weinberg – mastering engineer
- Manhattan Design – design
- Frank Olinsky – illustration
- Deborah Feingold – photography
- Bill Levy – art direction
