= Tom Tom Club (album) =

Studio album by Tom Tom Club
- Released: October 1981
- Recorded: November 1980 – April 1981
- Studio: Compass Point, Nassau, Bahamas
- Genre: Funk
- Length: 39:35
- Label: Sire/Warner Bros. (US); Island/PolyGram (UK); A&M (Argentina); Mercury (Australia)
- Producer: Chris Frantz; Tina Weymouth; Steven Stanley

Tom Tom Club chronology
Tom Tom Club (1981)	Close to the Bone (1983)

Singles from Tom Tom Club
- 1. "Wordy Rappinghood" Released: February 1981; 2. "Genius of Love" Released: September 1981; 3. "On, On, On, On..." / "L'éléphant" Released: January 1982 (Japan only); 4. "Under the Boardwalk" Released: June 1982

Professional ratings
Review scores
Source	Rating
AllMusic	4/5 stars
Record Collector	4/5 stars
Record Mirror	5/5 stars
Rolling Stone	4/5 stars
Smash Hits	6.5/10
The Village Voice	A−

Tom Tom Club is the debut studio album by American new wave band Tom Tom Club, released in October 1981, containing the UK hit singles "Wordy Rappinghood", which reached No. 7 in June 1981 and "Genius of Love", which reached No. 65 in October of the same year. It was re-released in the UK in 1982 to include "Under the Boardwalk", which reached No. 22 in August 1982. When released in the United States, "Genius of Love" peaked at No. 31 on the Billboard Hot 100. Both "Wordy Rappinghood" and "Genius of Love" topped the US dance chart.

The album was re-released on May 19, 2009, as a part of a two-CD deluxe package with the band's second studio album, Close to the Bone (1983). The album was further reissued on Limited Edition white vinyl by Real Gone Music on March 1, 2019.

Slant Magazine listed the album at No. 87 on its Best Albums of the 1980s list.

== Track listing ==
Composer credits as registered with ASCAP or APRA: all works by Tina Weymouth, Chris Frantz, Adrian Belew and Steven Stanley, unless otherwise noted below. First printings of the album simply give composer credit on all tracks to Tom Tom Club as a collective.

=== LP version ===
==== Side 1 ====
1. "Wordy Rappinghood" (Tina Weymouth, Lani Weymouth, Laura Weymouth, Frantz, Stanley) – 6:27
2. "Genius of Love" – 5:34
3. "Tom Tom Theme" (Belew, Frantz) – 1:25
4. "L'éléphant" – 4:50

==== Side 2 ====
1. "As Above, So Below" – 5:23
2. "Lorelei" (Tina Weymouth, Laura Weymouth, Frantz, Belew, Stanley) – 5:05
3. "On, On, On, On..." (Tina Weymouth, Frantz, Belew) – 3:33
4. "Booming and Zooming" (Tina Weymouth, Frantz, Belew) – 4:32

=== Cassette version ===
==== Side 1 ====
1. "Wordy Rappinghood"
2. "Genius of Love"
3. "Tom Tom Theme"
4. "L'éléphant"

==== Side 2 ====
1. "As Above, So Below"
2. "Lorelei" (Remix)
3. "On, On, On, On..."
4. "Under the Boardwalk" (Kenny Young, Arthur Resnick)

=== CD version ===
1. "Wordy Rappinghood" – 6:27
2. "Genius of Love" – 5:34
3. "Tom Tom Theme" – 1:24
4. "L'éléphant" – 4:51
5. "As Above, So Below" – 5:22
6. "Lorelei" – 5:05
7. "On, On, On, On..." – 3:33
8. "Booming and Zooming" – 4:35
9. "Under the Boardwalk" – 5:46
10. "Lorelei" (Remix) – 6:17
11. "Wordy Rappinghood" (Long version) – 6:42
12. "Genius of Love" (Long version) – 7:26

Deluxe edition CD1

1. "Wordy Rappinghood" – 6:27
2. "Genius of Love" – 5:34
3. "Tom Tom Theme" – 1:24
4. "L'éléphant" – 4:51
5. "As Above, So Below" – 5:22
6. "Lorelei" (Album version) – 5:05
7. "On, On, On, On..." – 3:33
8. "Booming and Zooming" – 4:35
9. "Under the Boardwalk" – 5:46
10. "On, On, On, On..." (Remix) – 3:44
11. "Lorelei" (Remix) – 6:17
12. "Spooks" (Single version) – 6:32
13. "Elephant" (Single version) – 5:12
14. "(You Don't Stop) Wordy Rappinghood" (Single version) – 4:08

== Personnel ==
Tom Tom Club

- Tina Weymouth – lead vocals, bass guitar, co-producer
- Chris Frantz – drums, co-producer
- Adrian Belew – guitar
- Monte Brown – guitar
- Tyrone Downie – keyboards
- Uziah Thompson – percussion
- Lani Weymouth – vocals
- Laura Weymouth – vocals
- Loric Weymouth – vocals
- either Benji Armbrister or Kendal Stubbs – bass guitar on "Genius of Love" (uncredited)

Technical

- Steven Stanley – co-production, engineering, mixing
- Benji Armbrister – engineering
- Kendal Stubbs – engineering
- James Rizzi – cover illustration

== Charts ==
=== Weekly charts ===
Weekly chart performance of Tom Tom Club
Chart (1982)	Peak position
Australian Albums (Kent Music Report)	51
New Zealand Albums (RMNZ)	18
Swedish Albums (Sverigetopplistan)	32
UK Albums (OCC)	78
US Billboard 200	23

=== Year-end charts ===
Year-end chart performance of Tom Tom Club
Chart (1982)	Position
New Zealand Albums (RMNZ)	50

== Certifications ==
Certifications for Tom Tom Club
Region	Certification	Certified units/sales
Hong Kong (IFPI Hong Kong)	Gold	10,000^{*}
United States (RIAA)	Platinum	1,000,000^{‡}
^{*} Sales figures based on certification alone.^{‡} Sales+streaming figures based on certification alone.
