= Look My Way =

Look My Way may refer to:

- Look My Way (Madball album)
- Look My Way (Rosemary Clooney album)
- "Look My Way" (The Vels song)
- "Look My Way", a song by Britny Fox from Bite Down Hard
- "Look My Way", a song by Joe Satriani from Joe Satriani
- "Look My Way", a song by Kylie Minogue from Kylie
