= Withdrawal Method =

Studio album by Die Monster Die
- Released: 1994
- Recorded: October 1993
- Studio: RPM Studios (New York City); Shelter Island (New York City)
- Genre: Alternative rock; indie rock
- Length: 45:01
- Label: Roadrunner
- Producer: Steven Haigler

Die Monster Die chronology
Chrome Molly (1993)	Withdrawal Method (1994)

Singles from Withdrawal Method
- 1. "Slumber" Released: 1993; 2. "Barknuckle" Released: 1993

Withdrawal Method, originally titled Vagina Dentata, is the second and final studio album by American alternative rock band Die Monster Die, released in 1994 by Roadrunner Records. The album was recorded during October 1993 at RPM Studios in New York City with producer Steven Haigler, except for the track "Slumber" which was engineered by Ray Martin at Shelter Island. Withdrawal Method like their debut studio album, Chrome Molly (1993), failed to chart. Two singles were released from the album: "Slumber" and "Barknuckle", both of which also failed to chart.

== Critical reception ==
Professional ratings
Review scores
Source	Rating
AllMusic	2.5/5 stars

In a retrospective review for AllMusic, critic Eduardo Rivadavia wrote of the album, "no matter how hard it tries to be eclectic, Withdrawal Method never once breaks into truly uncharted territory, and if not for the haunting innocence of Alice Cohen's girlish croons, there'd be nothing memorable about the album."

== Track listing ==
All songs are written by Die Monster Die.

Side one

1. "Barknuckle" – 3:12
2. "Swallowed" – 3:33
3. "Wallflower Garden" – 2:54
4. "Slumber" – 3:51
5. "Toad" – 3:56
6. "Teeth" – 3:14

Side two

7. "Vagina Dentata" – 4:31
8. "Sympathy" – 3:38
9. "Cadmium Oscuro" – 4:37
10. "Wip" – 0:32
11. "Bones" – 2:15
12. "Pennies" – 4:59
13. "Portrait" – 3:55

== Personnel ==
Credits are adapted from the Withdrawal Method liner notes.

- Alice Cohen – vocals; bass guitar; organ
- Evan Player – guitar; bass guitar
- Kenny Sanders – drums; vocals
- Shawn Tracy – guitar
- Jane Scarpantoni – cello (track 3)
- Joe McGinty – vibraphone (track 12)

Production and artwork

- Steven Haigler – producer; engineer
- Ray Martin – engineer (track 4)
- Julio Paulino Peralta – assistant engineer
- Greg Calbi – mastering engineer
- LMD – design; type collage
- Mark Garland – artwork
- Alice Cohen – lyric page collage
- Karen Kuehn – photography

== Note on the band name ==
Since this Die Monster Die's breakup, another band called DieMonsterDie was founded in Utah; they are unrelated.
