= Close to the Bone (Tom Tom Club album) =

Studio album by Tom Tom Club
- Released: July 1983
- Studios: Compass Point, Nassau, Bahamas
- Length: 37:32
- Label: Sire/Warner Bros.
- Producers: Chris Frantz, Tina Weymouth, Steven Stanley

Tom Tom Club chronology
Tom Tom Club (1981)	Close to the Bone (1983)	Boom Boom Chi Boom Boom (1988)

Professional ratings
Review scores
Source	Rating
AllMusic	3/5 stars
Robert Christgau	C+

Close to the Bone is the second studio album by Tom Tom Club that was released in 1983. The Tom Tom Club's musicians were Wally Badarou, Tyrone Downie, Chris Frantz, Roddy Frantz, Rupert Hine, Raymond Jones, Steve Scales, Steven Stanley, Alex Weir; and sisters Lani, Laura and Tina Weymouth. The album was released on compact disc for the first time on May 19, 2009, as a part of a two-CD deluxe package with the band's first album, Tom Tom Club, as part of Universal Music's deluxe editions series.

== Singles ==
Two tracks from the album were released as singles, "Pleasure of Love" and "The Man with the 4-Way Hips", the latter reaching number 82 on the UK Singles Chart in August 1983.

== Track listing ==
All tracks composed by the Tom Tom Club

1. "Pleasure of Love" – 6:33
2. "On the Line Again" – 4:56
3. "This Is a Foxy World" – 3:39
4. "Bamboo Town" – 3:56
5. "The Man With the 4-Way Hips" – 5:48
6. "Measure Up" – 5:05
7. "Never Took a Penny" – 3:33
8. "Atsababy! (Life Is Great)" – 4:02

Bonus tracks:

1. "The Man with the 4-Way Hips" (extended version)
2. "Pleasure of Love" (instrumental)
3. "The Man With the 4-Way Hips" (dub version)
4. "Yella" (Mr. Yella Version)

== Personnel ==
Tom Tom Club

- Tina Weymouth – bass, vocals
- Chris Frantz – drums, vocals
- Alex Weir – guitar
- Wally Badarou – keyboards
- Tyrone Downie – keyboards
- Raymond Jones – keyboards
- Rupert Hine – keyboards
- Steve Scales – percussion
- Lani Weymouth – vocals
- Laura Weymouth – vocals
- Steven Stanley
- Roddy Frantz

Technical personnel

- James Rizzi – cover illustration
- Steven Stanley, Benjamin Armbrister, Frank Hanna, Kendall Stubbs – recording, mixing

== Chart performance ==
The album spent 13 weeks on the US Billboard album charts and reached its peak position of number 73 in early September 1983.

Chart performance for Close to the Bone
Chart (1983)	Peak position
Canada Top Albums/CDs (RPM)	96
New Zealand Albums (RMNZ)	31
Swedish Albums (Sverigetopplistan)	42
US Billboard 200	79
US Top R&B/Hip-Hop Albums (Billboard)	49
