= Genius of Love =

1981 single by Tom Tom Club

- Artwork used as front cover of the French single and as back cover of the UK single

Single by Tom Tom Club

from the album Tom Tom Club
- B-side: "Lorelei"
- Released: September 6, 1981; October 2, 1981 (UK)
- Recorded: 1980
- Genre: Post-disco; new wave; dance; synth-pop; funk
- Length: 3:36 (7" single); 5:34 (album version); 7:26 (long version)
- Label: Sire; Warner Bros.
- Songwriters: Adrian Belew; Chris Frantz; Steven Stanley; Tina Weymouth
- Producers: Chris Frantz; Steven Stanley; Tina Weymouth

Tom Tom Club singles chronology
"Wordy Rappinghood" (1981)	"Genius of Love" (1981)	"Under the Boardwalk" (1982)

Music video
- "Genius of Love" on YouTube

"Genius of Love" is a song by American new wave band Tom Tom Club, released in September 1981 by Sire and Warner Bros. as the second single from their eponymous debut studio album (1981). The song is written by Adrian Belew, Chris Frantz, Steven Stanley and Tina Weymouth, and produced by the three latter. It reached number one on the US Billboard Disco Top 80 chart, and was performed by Talking Heads (the group from which Tom Tom Club originated) in the 1984 concert film Stop Making Sense. "Genius of Love" was accompanied by a hand-drawn crayon and colored pencil animated music video. In 2022, Rolling Stone ranked the song number 26 in their list of the "200 Greatest Dance Songs of All Time".

== Background ==
"Genius of Love" is credited to songwriters Tina Weymouth, Chris Frantz, guitarist Adrian Belew, and producer Steven Stanley. According to Talking Heads biographer David Bowman, the song originated after Frantz "copped a beat from Zapp's 1980 hit 'More Bounce to the Ounce'." Belew created a rhythm guitar part, Stanley created the keyboard melody, and Weymouth later wrote the words.

The lyrics also pay tribute to many notable black musicians and singers, including George Clinton, Bootsy Collins, Smokey Robinson, Bob Marley, Sly and Robbie, Kurtis Blow, Hamilton Bohannon, and James Brown.

"Genius of Love" was designated as Tom Tom Club's second single. Although the album had not been released in North America, over 100,000 copies of the single sold as imports from Island Records UK, at which point Sire Records made a deal to release the single and the album in North America in late 1981.

Frantz and Weymouth performed the song as Tom Tom Club in the 1984 Talking Heads concert movie Stop Making Sense, as an interlude to allow Talking Heads frontman David Byrne to change into the "big suit" costume for the film's performance of "Girlfriend Is Better". The recording of the song was also included on the soundtrack to the film.

== Recording ==
Weymouth sings the primary lead on "Genius of Love", and Frantz plays drums and sings the song's later male vocals. Weymouth's sisters, Lani and Laura, feature on backing vocals. Adrian Belew is credited with guitar, Tyrone Downie with synthesizers and Uziah "Sticky" Thompson with percussion.

=== Identity of bassist on studio version ===
Although Tina Weymouth was responsible for writing the bassline, and had intended to play it herself on the record, she was forced to pass this onto another musician. She later recounted, in a 1997 interview with Bassplayer.com:

"We were given extremely limited studio time – just three days – and when it was time to do that track my whole right arm seized up in a terrible cramp, and I couldn't play. I had never played in the studio around the clock like we were doing, so I didn't even know that could happen. I ended up waking the assistant engineer – he was asleep under the console – and I showed him the part, and he played it. Chris was mad, but I really couldn't play; my hand wouldn't even close. So we did what we had to do. These things happen."

== Chart performance and music video ==
"Genius of Love" became a commercial success. Frantz credited the success of the single for convincing David Byrne to "soldier on with Talking Heads." The official hand-drawn crayon and colored pencil animated music video for "Genius of Love" was produced by the band along with Cucumber Studios Ltd.

On its release in November 1981, "Genius of Love" became a huge hit in clubs and on R&B and dance charts worldwide, soon earning the Tom Tom Club studio album a Gold Sales Award in 1982. In the US, the song reached No. 1 on the Billboard Disco Top 80 chart along with "Wordy Rappinghood", and also reached No. 2 on the Hot Soul Singles chart. It later went on to peak at No. 31 on the Billboard Hot 100 in April 1982, becoming Tom Tom Club's only entry on the Hot 100.

"Genius of Love" reached No. 65 on the UK Singles Chart, while both of the other two singles released from the Tom Tom Club album achieved top 30 placings in the UK. The single also became a club success all around Europe, and peaked at number 28 in New Zealand, the first of three top 40 hits for the band there.

== Legacy ==
=== Use as a sample ===
"Genius of Love" was one of the most interpolated hooks of the 1980s, and has continued to be one of the most popular beats within the hip hop, rap and R&B genres, in particular. Notable early versions include Dr. Jeckyll & Mr. Hyde's "Genius Rap" (1981) and Grandmaster Flash and the Furious Five's "It's Nasty" (1982).

Perhaps the most well-known use of "Genius of Love" is heard on American singer Mariah Carey's "Fantasy", the lead single off her multiplatinum fifth studio album, Daydream (Columbia 1995). The single was a major success, peaking at No. 1 on the Billboard Hot 100 for eight consecutive weeks and remaining on the chart for 25 weeks. "Fantasy" has also been credited with exposing the Tom Tom Club and "Genius of Love" to newer and possibly younger listeners, a point further solidified when the song was sampled over 25 years later by rapper Latto on her single "Big Energy" (2021). Carey herself made a surprise appearance to perform the song with Latto, live, at the 2022 BET Awards.

=== Accolades ===
In June 2020, Slant Magazine ranked "Genius of Love" number 70 in their list of "The 100 Best Dance Songs of All Time". In July 2022, Rolling Stone ranked the song number 26 in their "200 Greatest Dance Songs of All Time" list.

== Personnel ==
- Tina Weymouth – vocals
- Chris Frantz – vocals, drum machine
- Adrian Belew – guitar
- Tyrone Downie – synthesizers
- Uziah "Sticky" Thompson – percussion
- Uncredited assistant engineer (either Kendal Stubbs or Benji Armbrister) – bass
- Laura Weymouth – backing vocals
- Lani Weymouth – backing vocals, spoken words

== Singles ==
- "Genius of Love" / "Lorelei" (Instrumental) UK, 1981 (7"/12")
- "Genius of Love" / "Lorelei" (Instrumental) Netherlands, 1981 (7"/12")
- "Genius of Love" / "Lorelei" (Instrumental) Germany, 1981 (7")
- "Genius of Love" / "Lorelei" (Instrumental) United States, 1981 (7"/12")

== Charts ==
Chart performance for "Genius of Love"
Chart (1982)	Peak position
Belgium (Ultratop 50 Flanders)	26
New Zealand (Recorded Music NZ)	28
UK Singles (Official Charts)	65
US Billboard Hot 100	31
US Hot Dance Club Songs (Billboard)	1
US Hot R&B/Hip-Hop Songs (Billboard)	2
