= Pleasure of Love =

Pleasure of Love may refer to:

- Pleasure of Love (Tom Tom Club song), 1983
- "The Pleasure of Love", a 2005 song by Kimeru
- "The Pleasure of Love", a literally translated title of the 1784 poem, "Plaisir d'amour"
