= Downtown Rockers =

Studio album by Tom Tom Club
- Released: September 11, 2012
- Studio: Clubhouse Music
- Genre: Dance-rock; indie rock
- Length: 44:52
- Language: English
- Label: Nacional
- Producer: Chris Frantz, Tina Weymouth

Tom Tom Club chronology
The Good, the Bad, and the Funky (2000)	Downtown Rockers (2012)	Let There Be Love (2026)

We’ve always been on the upbeat side, and I think these songs are good for parties and dancing. I think it’s safe to say they will lift people’s spirits.

— Tom Tom Club drummer and album producer Chris Frantz on the tone of Downtown Rockers.

Downtown Rockers is a 2012 EP and the sixth studio album by American rock band Tom Tom Club, released on Nacional Records. The vinyl EP features five songs, with some digital versions expanding the track listing to nine or twelve with remixes and alternate versions. A music video was also produced for the title track.

== Reception ==
The editorial staff at AllMusic Guide gave the album four out of five stars, with reviewer Fred Thomas writing, "every song feeling more natural, relaxed, and groovy than the last". Hilary Saunders of Paste rated this album a 6.8 out of 10, characterizing it as "a much-needed filler in the wide-ranging void that is the modern dance scene" that has strong instrumentation and weak lyrics.

== Track listing ==
All songs written by Chris Frantz, Bruce Martin, Pablo Martin, and Tina Weymouth

1. "Downtown Rockers" – 4:08
2. "Won't Give You Up" – 4:29
3. "You Make Me Rock and Roll" – 4:17
4. "Kissin' Antonio" – 3:43
5. "Sweets to the Sweet" – 4:34
6. "Downtown Rockers" (Ed Stasium E-Dub Mix) – 6:35
7. "Downtown Rockers" (Arthur Baker Superstar DJ Mix) – 7:35
8. "Kissin' Antonio" (Entro & Ginseng Short Mix) – 5:44
9. "Kissin' Antonio" (DJ Latin Bitman Mix) – 3:47

The albums vinyl EP edition contains only the first five tracks. Other digital editions expand the nine listed here to twelve.

== Personnel ==
Tom Tom Club

- Chris Frantz – artwork, drums, percussion, production, vocals
- Bruce Martin – keyboards, percussion
- Pablo Martin – guitar
- Tina Weymouth – artwork, bass guitar, overdub engineering, percussion engineering, production, synthesizer, tambourine, vocal engineering, vocals

Additional personnel

- Adam Ayan – mastering
- Tyler Bird – engineering, mixing, vocal engineering
- Victoria Clamp – vocals
- Egan Frantz – package design
- Ed Stasium – mixing
