= Victoria Clamp =

American musician

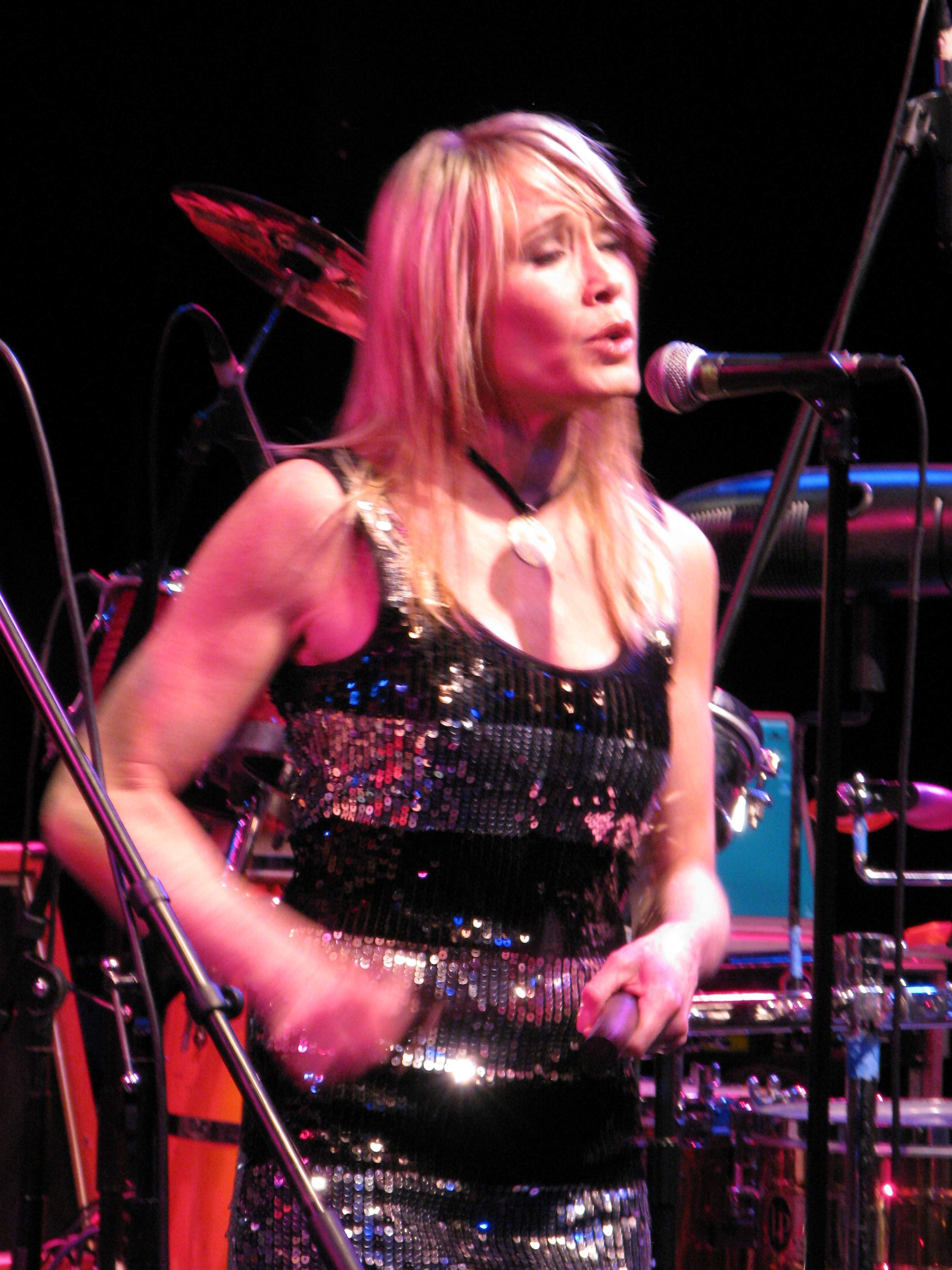
Victoria Palagy (aka Victoria Clamp) with Tom Tom Club in 2008

Victoria Clamp, also known as Victoria Palagy is an American musician, best known as a vocalist in Tom Tom Club, led by Chris Frantz and Tina Weymouth. She is also the lead singer of the band BlondeStreak.

Victoria graduated at Northcentral University in 2014
