= Read Between the Lines (song) =

Single by Lynn Anderson
- B-side: "If This Ain't Love"
- Released: September 1987
- Recorded: April 1980
- Genre: Country
- Length: 3:21
- Label: Mercury
- Songwriters: Kathy Baillie; Michael Bonagura; Don Schlitz
- Producer: Gary Scruggs

Lynn Anderson singles chronology
"Didn't We Shine" (1986)	"Read Between the Lines" (1987)	"Under the Boardwalk" (1988)

"Read Between the Lines" is a song written by Kathie Baillie, Michael Bonagura and Don Schlitz. It was recorded by American country music artist Lynn Anderson and released as a single in 1987 via Mercury Records.

== Background and release ==
"Read Between the Lines" was Anderson's second single release for Mercury Records. It was recorded in April 1987 in a session produced by Gary Scruggs. "Read Between the Lines" was released as a single in September 1987. The song spent 12 weeks on the Billboard Hot Country Singles chart before reaching the top 40 at number 38 in November 1987. It was Anderson's first top 40 hit since 1984's "You're Welcome to Tonight." It was among her final charting singles as well. "Read Between the Lines" was not included on an album release.

== Track listings ==
7" vinyl single

- "Read Between the Lines" – 3:21
- "If This Ain't Love" – 2:40

== Chart performance ==
Chart (1987)	Peak position
US Hot Country Songs (Billboard)	38
