= Look My Way (The Vels song) =

Single by the Vels

from the album Velocity
- Released: 1984
- Studio: Compass Point (Nassau, Bahamas)
- Genre: New wave; synth-pop
- Length: 4:38
- Label: Mercury
- Songwriters: Alice Desoto; Charles Hansen; Chris Larkin
- Producer: Steven Stanley

The Vels singles chronology
"Private World" (1984)	"Look My Way" (1984)	"Girl Most Likely To" (1986)

Music video
- "Look My Way" on YouTube

"Look My Way" is a song by American new wave and synth-pop band the Vels, released as both a 7" and 12" single from their debut studio album, Velocity (1984). Produced by Steven Stanley, the single was released by Mercury Records exclusively in the U.S and Australia. The single peaked at No. 39 on the U.S. Billboard Dance Club Songs chart and at No. 72 on the U.S. Billboard Hot 100.

A music video for "Look My Way" was filmed in London, England, and became popular during the early days of MTV.

== Track listing ==
7" single

1. "Look My Way"
2. "Can't You Hear Me?"

12" single

1. "Look My Way"
2. "Look My Way (Dub Version)"
3. "Tell Me Something"
4. "Tell Me Something (Dub Version)"

== Chart performance ==
Chart	Position
US Billboard Hot 100	72
US Dance Club Songs (Billboard)	39
