= House of Miracles (The Vels album) =

Studio album by the Vels
- Released: 1986
- Studios: Studio Miraval (Correns, France)
- Genres: New wave; synth-pop
- Length: 34:31
- Label: Mercury
- Producer: Steve Levine

The Vels chronology
Velocity (1984)	House of Miracles (1986)

Singles from House of Miracles
- 1. "Girl Most Likely To" Released: 1986

Professional ratings
Review scores
Source	Rating
AllMusic	3/5 stars

House of Miracles is the second and final studio album by American new wave and synth-pop band the Vels, released in 1986 by Mercury Records and it was performed as a duo of lead vocalist and keyboardist Alice Cohen and bassist and guitarist Charles Hansen following the departure of founding member Chris Larkin. It was recorded at Studio Miraval in Correns, southeastern France with record producer Steve Levine, best known for his work with Culture Club. House of Miracles like their debut studio album, Velocity (1984), failed to chart. "Girl Most Likely To" was the sole single released from the album but it also did not chart and the band broke up a year after the album was released. The track "Souvenirs" had been written for the Bangles but that failed to materialise and it was instead recorded for this album.

The album has remained unavailable on CD or MP3 and has been long out of print on vinyl since its initial release.

== Track listing ==
Side one

1. "Danger Zone" – 3:15
2. "Girl Most Likely To" – 3:42
3. "Way with Words" – 3:53
4. "Face to Face" – 3:16
5. "Hand in Hand" – 3:00

Side two

6. "House of Miracles" – 3:19
7. "Souvenirs" – 3:23
8. "Guardian Angel" – 3:36
9. "Buried Treasure" – 3:14
10. "Once Upon a Time" – 3:42

== Personnel ==
Credits are adapted from the House of Miracles liner notes.

The Vels

- Alice Cohen (as Alice Desoto) — vocals; keyboards
- Charles Hansen — drums; bass; guitar; keyboards; percussion

Additional musicians

- Julian Lindsay — Yamaha QXI sequencer programming
- Robert Holmes — guitars on "Girl Most Likely To"

Production

- Steve Levine — producer; mixer
- The Vels — mixing
- Ron Saint Germain — mixing on "Girl Most Likely To"
- Greg Laney — engineer
- Jacques Hermet — assistant engineer
