= Alice Cohen =

American singer-songwriter

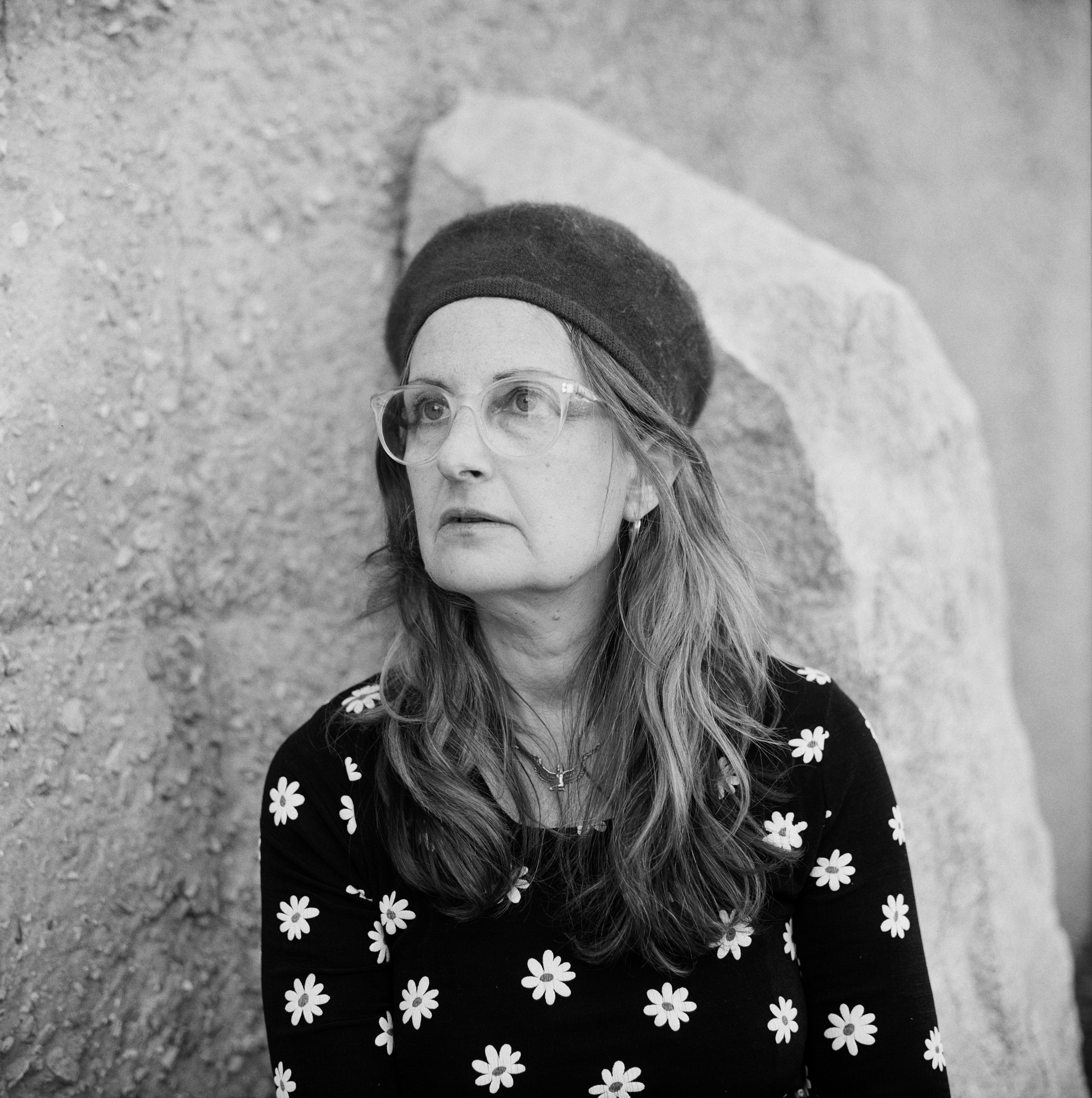
- Cohen in 2021

Background information
- Also known as: Alice Desoto
- Born: Alice Melinda Cohen; November 25, 1958 (age 67); Cincinnati, Ohio, U.S.
- Origin: Philadelphia, Pennsylvania, U.S.
- Genres: New wave; synth-pop; alternative rock; indie rock; experimental pop; lo-fi
- Occupations: Singer; songwriter; musician; fine artist
- Instruments: Vocals; keyboards; guitar; bass guitar
- Years active: 1978–present
- Labels: Chrysalis; Atlantic; Mercury; Dutch East; Roadrunner; Lungcast; Evil Teen; Spare Me; Zilcho; BMG; Olde English Spelling Bee; Crinoline; Sixteen Tambourines; NNA Tapes; Styles Upon Styles; Dinosaur City
- Formerly of: The Vels; Die Monster Die; Helivator; Fun City
- Website: alicecohen.com

Alice Melinda Cohen (born November 25, 1958) also known by the stage name Alice Desoto, is a New York City-based American singer, songwriter, musician and fine artist. She has performed as the lead vocalist for two major label bands, the Vels and Die Monster Die. The Vels were the more commercially successful of the two, with their 1984 single "Look My Way" peaking at No. 72 on the U.S. Billboard Hot 100. Cohen has also pursued a solo career and has released eight studio albums since 2008.

== Early years ==
Alice Melinda Cohen was born on November 25, 1958 in Cincinnati, Ohio, and grew up in Conshohocken, and later Center City in Philadelphia, Pennsylvania, the daughter of two professional jazz pianists, Robert Cohen (died 2019) and Harriet Levin Cohen (died 2002). Her father Robert was a respected figure in the Philadelphia jazz community, having performed for decades in the area, and he also had a chance performance with highly influential saxophonist Charlie Parker.

Her parents would have jam sessions, and her father had a small 2 track recording studio in their basement at one point, which is where she started recording her demos.

== Career ==
=== The Vels ===
Cohen is best known for her work as the lead vocalist and primary songwriter of the Vels, a Philadelphia new wave and synth-pop band that she co-founded in 1980. In 1984, they signed a recording contract with Mercury Records and released two studio albums, Velocity (1984) and House of Miracles (1986), neither of which charted. However, they had one minor hit ("Look My Way") and a successful MTV music video.

The Vels toured the U.S. in 1986, opening for English rock band the Psychedelic Furs.

== Musical history ==
In 1980, Cohen wrote the disco song "Deetour" for Karen Young which was then released as a single in 1982, re-released on Horse Meat Disco in July 2009. To date this is the only time that she has written a song for someone else. The track "Souvenirs" was originally written for the Bangles but the recording deal failed to materialise and the song was instead recorded for the Vels' second studio album, House of Miracles.

After the Vels broke up in 1987, Cohen's career changed direction and she became active in the indie rock and underground touring scene. Cohen's best-known venture in this period was the band Die Monster Die. DMD released two studio albums: 1992's Chrome Molly on Dutch East, and 1994's Withdrawal Method on Roadrunner Records. The band broke up soon after. (N.B. In 2000, another band, founded in Salt Lake City in 1995 as Casa Diablo, renamed itself DieMonsterDie; this band is unrelated to the band Cohen was in.)

In 1996, Cohen sang a track (on camera) in the Martin Scorsese-produced musical comedy-drama film Grace of My Heart (1996), directed by Allison Anders.

In recent years, Cohen has performed frequently as a solo act, as well as collaborating with a number of groups including LYDSOD, Long Lost, Raw Thrills, Castles, and Espadrille. In 2008, she released her debut solo studio album Sky Flowers on her self-owned label Crinoline Records. Other solo studio albums include Walking Up Walls (2009), Pink Keys (2012), Wild Vines & Tenement Shrines (2013), Into the Grey Salons (2016), Artificial Fairytales (2019), Moonrising (2022), and her most recent album, Archaeology (2025).

With the release of Cohen's solo albums, she became active in video and animation, creating music videos to accompany her own releases, as well as composing soundtracks for other animations and video projects.

== Visual arts ==
Cohen's collages and paintings have appeared in galleries in New York City, San Francisco and elsewhere. She has made music videos for dozens of indie bands and musicians.

In 2008, Cohen began to produce animated music videos for artists such as Ducktails, Coasting, Broken Deer, and Greatest Hits, using found imagery and objects in traditional cutout and stop motion animation style.

Other video and animation work includes "Single Sentence Animations" for the independent publisher Electric Literature as well as gallery and installation work. Cohen animated 17 episodes of the 2016 TV show Single + Swiping for Full Screen Network.

In 2010, Cohen had her first solo exhibition of visual works including video, collage, and installation, which took place at Live with Animals gallery in Williamsburg, Brooklyn.

Her work has been screened at Anthology Film Archives, the Film-Makers' Cooperative, Printed Matter, Inc., Microscope Gallery, Millennium Film Workshop, the New Museum, the Morbid Anatomy Museum, and the Palace of Culture and Science in Warsaw, Poland.

== Discography ==
=== Solo releases ===
- Sky Flowers (2008) (Crinoline Records)
- Walking Up Walls (2009) (Olde English Spelling Bee)
- Pink Keys (2012) (Olde English Spelling Bee and Crinoline Records)
- Wild Vines and Tenement Shrines (2013) (Sixteen Tambourines Records)
- Into the Grey Salons (2015) (Olde English Spelling Bee and Crinoline Records)
- Artificial Fairytales (2019) (NNA Tapes)
- Moonrising (2022) (Styles Upon Styles and Dinosaur City Records)
- Archaeology (2025) (Crinoline Records)
- Cardboard Mermaids (2026; EP)

=== With the Vels (Mercury Records) ===
- Velocity (1984)
  - "Private World/Hieroglyphics 12" Dub" (1984)
  - "Look My Way/Tell Me Something 12" Dub" (1984)
- House of Miracles (1986)
  - "Girl Most Likely To 12" Dub" (1986)

=== With Die Monster Die ===
  - "Planet b/w Blackwater Trailer Park Blue" 7" (Deadbolt Records) (1992)
  - "Slumber b/w Pennies" 7" (Roadrunner Records) (1993)
  - "Barknuckle b/w Wallflower Garden" 7" (Funky Mushroom Records) (1993)
- Chrome Molly (Johnson Brothers Music/Dutch East India Trading) (1993)
- Withdrawal Method (Roadrunner Records) (1994)

=== With Espadrille (Spare Me Records) ===
- "Swimmeret" (2001)
- "Bikini Girl" b/w Hollow Sidewalk 7" (1999)

=== With Moroccos ===
- "3D Sound B/W Soul Safari" 7" (t.m.i Products) (1982)
- "t.m.i. 015 A Compilation" (t.m.i Products) (1982)

=== With Helivator (Lungcast) ===
- Gasoline T-Shirt (1994)

=== Appearing on ===
- "Feed a Pigeon, Breed a Rat" Zach Philiips (la Loi) (2021)
- "Blue Ragu Volume 2" Blue Jazz TV (Galtta) (2018)
- "The New Age" Nick Stevens (Galtta) (2018)
- "Karaoke Life" Blue Jazz TV (Hunka Vinyl) (2018)
- "Chiba Girl" Blue Jazz TV (Hunka Vinyl) (2018)
- "Vacation Man" Adrian Knight (Galtta) (2018)
- "On the Prowl Again" Adrian Knight (Galtta) (2016)
- "Radio Scenic Glow Vol. 1" Compilation (Upstairs) (2009)
- "Africa Germany Germany Mexico Turkey Australia" (Olde English Spelling Bee) (2009)
- "Breakout" Compilation (Compilation, Chrysalis Records) (1979)
- "Deetour" (songwriter) Karen Young (Atlantic Records) (1980)
- "Greetings from Port Authority" Benna (Evil Teen Records) (1996)
- "The Best of Nilsson" Nilsson (BMG) (1998)

== Filmography ==
=== Music videos ===
- "Landrunner" — Ducktails (2009)
- "Ichthus Hop" — Talbot Tagora (2009)
- "Black Pepper" — Alice Cohen (2009)
- "Memories of Glaciers" — Alice Cohen (2009)
- "White Woman" — Broken Deer (2010)
- "Kids" — Coasting (2010)
- "Ambulance" — Greatest Hits (2010)
- "Where the Walls Are Made of Grass" — Fergus and Geronimo (2010)
- "Totem" — Weekends (2010)
- "Marsupial Shenanigans" — Linda Hagood (2010)
- "Ice Cream" — Big Gold Belt (2011)
- "The Gutter" — K-Holes (2011)
- "Dream World" — Majical Cloudz (2011)
- "Swells" — Norse Horse (2011)
- "Baltika 9" — Deleted Scenes (2011)
- "Earth to Friend" — Pop Winds (2011)
- "Broken Heartscape" — Vomit Heat (2011)
- "Sludgy Dreams" — The Band in Heaven (2011)
- "Same Old Same Old" — Coasting (2012)
- "Saxophones are Golden" — Octa#grape (2012)
- "Gone in a Second" — John Singer Sergeant (2012)
- "Private Booths for Sallow Suits" — Human Resources (2012)
- "Jungle of Vines" — Alice Cohen (2012)
- "The Phantom's Theme" — Ruckus Roboticus (2013)
- "Black Magic" — Maria Minerva (2013)
- "Swords" — Lovers and Reflections (2013)
- "Music Television" — The Band in Heaven (2013)
- "Alpha Beta" — MAYa (2014)
- "In White Relief" — Archie Bronson Outfit (2014)
- "Don't Go" — Quinn (2014)
- "In the Morning" — Lizard Kisses (2014)
- "Spiritual" — Tidal Channel (2015)
- "Children Games" — Mirage (2015)
- "Dress Well" — Tigue (2015)
- "California Numbers" — Douglas Miles Clarke (2015)
- "Go" — Underground System (2018)
- "Heleyos" — Mitra Sumara (2018)
- "Swaying Plants" — Linda "Goldie" Hagood (2019)
- "Suzie" — The Sweethearts (2020)

=== Art videos ===
- "Spools" (2009)
- "Trance Actions" (2010)
- "Mirror Moves for Private Eyes" (2010)
- "Ear Candy" (2010)
- "For Claire" (2011)
- "Perfumes of Venus" (2014)
- "Elegant Interiors" (2014)
- "Spirit of the Magpie" (2015)

=== Other commissioned work ===
- "Three Girls" — Single Sentence Animation for Electric Literature (2009)
- "Baba Iaga and the Pelican Child" — Single Sentence Animation for Electric Literature (2010)
- The BJ Rubin Show — Cable Access Television Show (2014–2020)
- Single + Swiping — TV Docu-series (Full Screen Media Network) (2016)
- "Skeleton Woman" — Animation for a story by Olivia Wyatt (2019)
