= James Rizzi =

American painter (1950–2011)

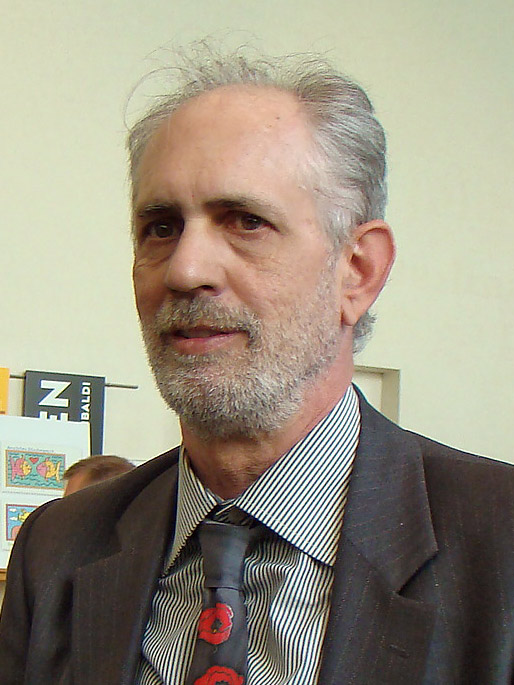
- Rizzi in 2008
- Born: October 5, 1950; Brooklyn, New York, U.S.
- Died: December 26, 2011 (aged 61); New York City, New York, U.S.
- Education: University of Florida
- Known for: Pop art

James Rizzi (October 5, 1950 – December 26, 2011) was an American pop artist who was born and raised in Brooklyn, New York.

In 2011, at the age of 61, Rizzi died after suffering from a heart condition.

== Biography ==
Rizzi graduated from University of Florida in Gainesville, Florida. He came up with the idea of 3D multiples now mostly associated with his name when, having taken classes in painting, printmaking and sculpturing, he had to hand in grade work for all three subjects, but only had time for doing one. So he created an etching, printed it twice, handcolored it, and mounted parts of the one print on top of the other, using wire as a means of adding depth. Having received good grades from all three teachers, he stuck with the idea and developed it further.

Rizzi was most famous for his 3D artwork, "especially the large, elaborate prints and teeming anthropomorphic cityscapes. His merry maximalism and delight in delirious detail and elaborate minutiae created a true art brand, a trademark style as recognizable as any in the world."

Late in life, he returned to painting. His "latest paintings combine his Picasso meets Hanna-Barbera drawing style with an increasingly chromatic palette and a complex graphic structure that simultaneously evokes cubism and the most sophisticated Amerindian friezes."

== Timeline ==
| Year | Projects |
|---|---|
| 1974 | Rizzi graduated from University of Florida and had his first exhibitions in outdoor art shows in Washington Square Park and Brooklyn Heights, New York. |
| 1976 | Participation in the exhibition "Thirty Years of American Printmarking, including the 20th National Print Exhibition" at the Brooklyn Museum. |
| 1980—1983 | Rizzi designed album-cover artwork and created animation for music videos by Tom Tom Club. |
| 1987 | Japanese television produces a film about Rizzi. |
| 1988 | The first book about Rizzi is published:James Rizzi - 3D Constructions. |
| 1988–90 | Various design projects in Japan. |
| 1992 | The second book about Rizzi is published: Glenn O'Brien, Rizzi. |
| 1993 | Rizzi designs the ring coat for German boxer Henry Maske. |
| 1994 | Design of china for Rosenthal and of a limited MetroCard for the Metropolitan Transportation Authority. |
| 1996 | Publication of The New York Paintings. Rizzi is the official artist of the 1996 Olympic Summer Games in Atlanta, Georgia. He designs the exterior shell of a Boeing 757 for Lufthansa's charter airline Condor Airlines - the "Rizzi Bird". |
| 1997 | Official artist for the Montreux Jazz Festival in Switzerland. Retrospective in Brooklyn, New York at the Mill Basin Kosher Deli and Gallery and declaration of the opening day as "James Rizzi Day" by the Brooklyn Borough President. |
| 1998 | Artist of the year, United States Sports Academy. Official Artist, FIFA World Cup, France. Official participation in the World Economic Forum in Davos, Switzerland. Distinguished Alumni Award, University of Florida. |
| 1999 | Design of three New Beetles for Volkswagen. Design of covers for 15-volume Brockhaus encyclopedia. |
| 2000 | Participation in CowParade, New York City. Work for UNICEF and the Japanese Railway. |
| 2001 | Opening of the "Happy Rizzi House", an office building designed by Rizzi in Braunschweig, Germany. |
| 2002 | Front page design for a newspaper in Hamburg, Germany. Design of a Teddy bear for Steiff. Design of three light railway cars for city of Heilbronn. Official participation in the World Economic Forum in New York City. |
| 2003 | Design of official poster for German public radio (SWR3). |
| 2004 | Design of a model New York fire engine for Schuco. |
| 2005 | Charity project together with Lions Club Germany and "action medeor" for the victims of the Pakistan earthquake. |
| 2006 | Receives Steiger Award in Dortmund, Germany, together with Mohamed ElBaradei, Claude Nobs, José Carreras, Jean-Claude Juncker, and others. Publication of his latest book titled James Rizzi: Artwork 1993-2006, by Glenn O'Brien and Mark Weinberg. Design of official poster for the opening of the New York golf course on Governors Island. |
| 2007 | Children's charity project together with Peter Maffay. Joint project with fellow artist, Volker Kühn. Rizzi gets honored with the "Outstanding Alumni Award" by the College of Fine Arts at the University of Florida at Gainesville, FL, his former art school. Design of album cover for Bob Sinclar's 2007 album Soundz of Freedom. |
| 2008 | Rizzi is the first living artist ever to be commissioned by the German government to create official postage stamps for Germany. On the occasion of the 30th anniversary of Artexpo New York, Rizzi is inducted into the inaugural Artexpo Hall of Fame. Retrospective exhibition of Rizzi's work in the Rheingold Hall in Mainz, Germany - the largest Rizzi exhibition ever with over 1,000 pieces of artwork on display, and over 50,000 paying visitors. |

== Gallery ==
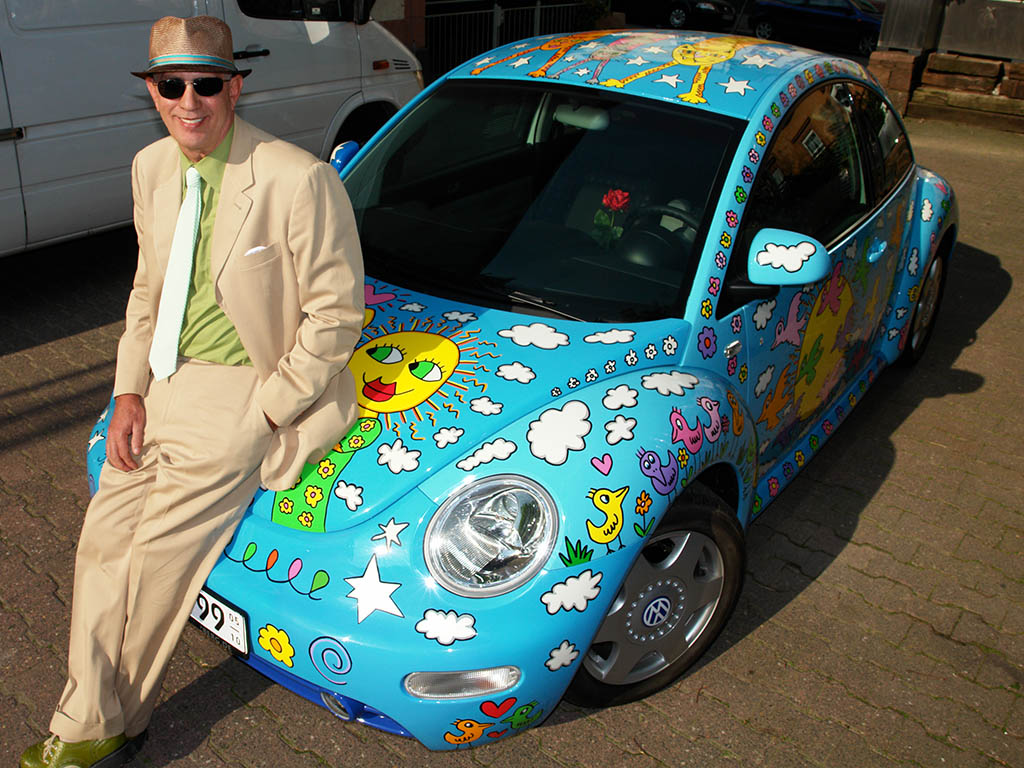
James Rizzi with the Volkswagen New Beetle designed by him.

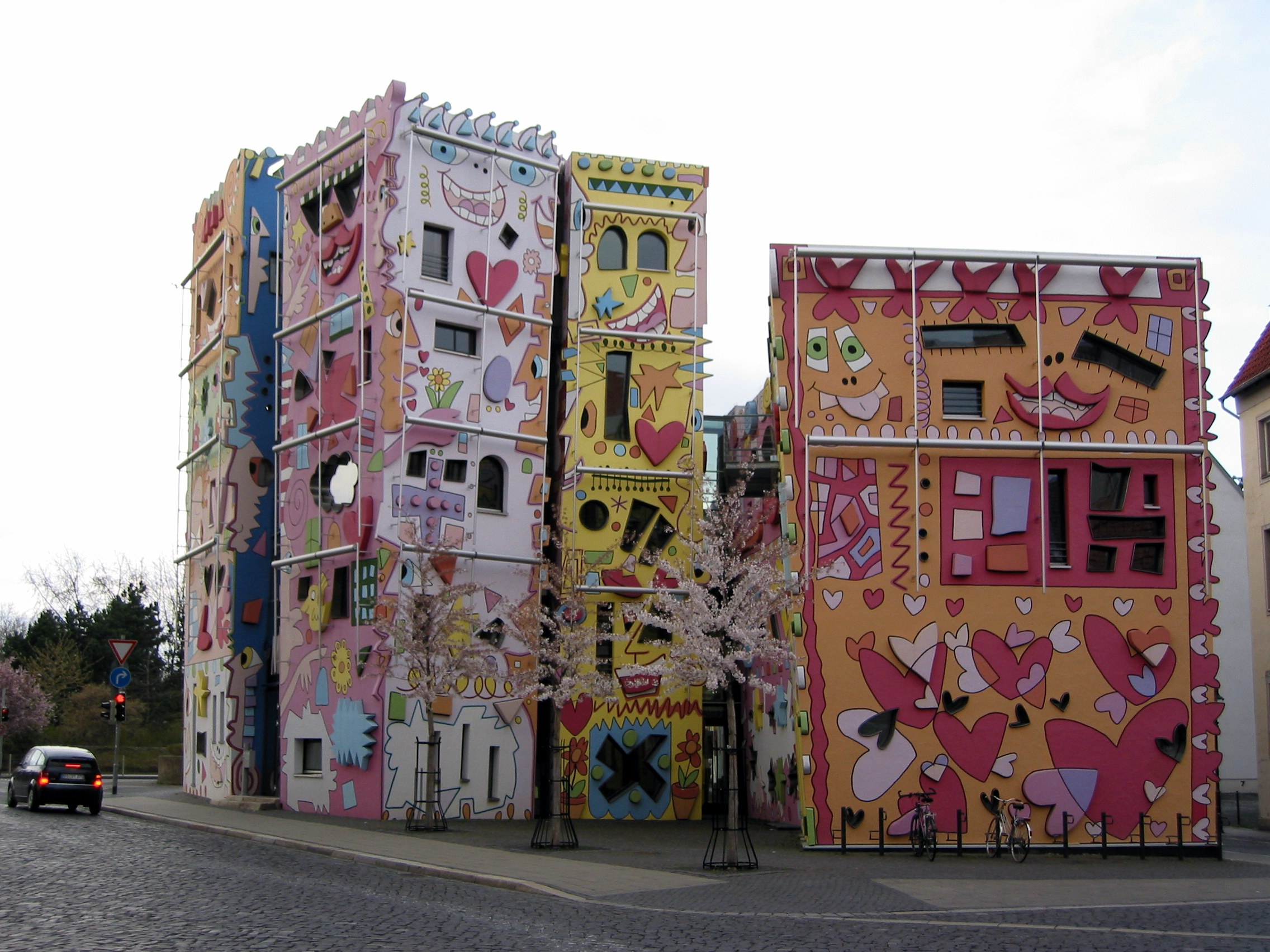
The "Happy Rizzi House" in Braunschweig, Germany.

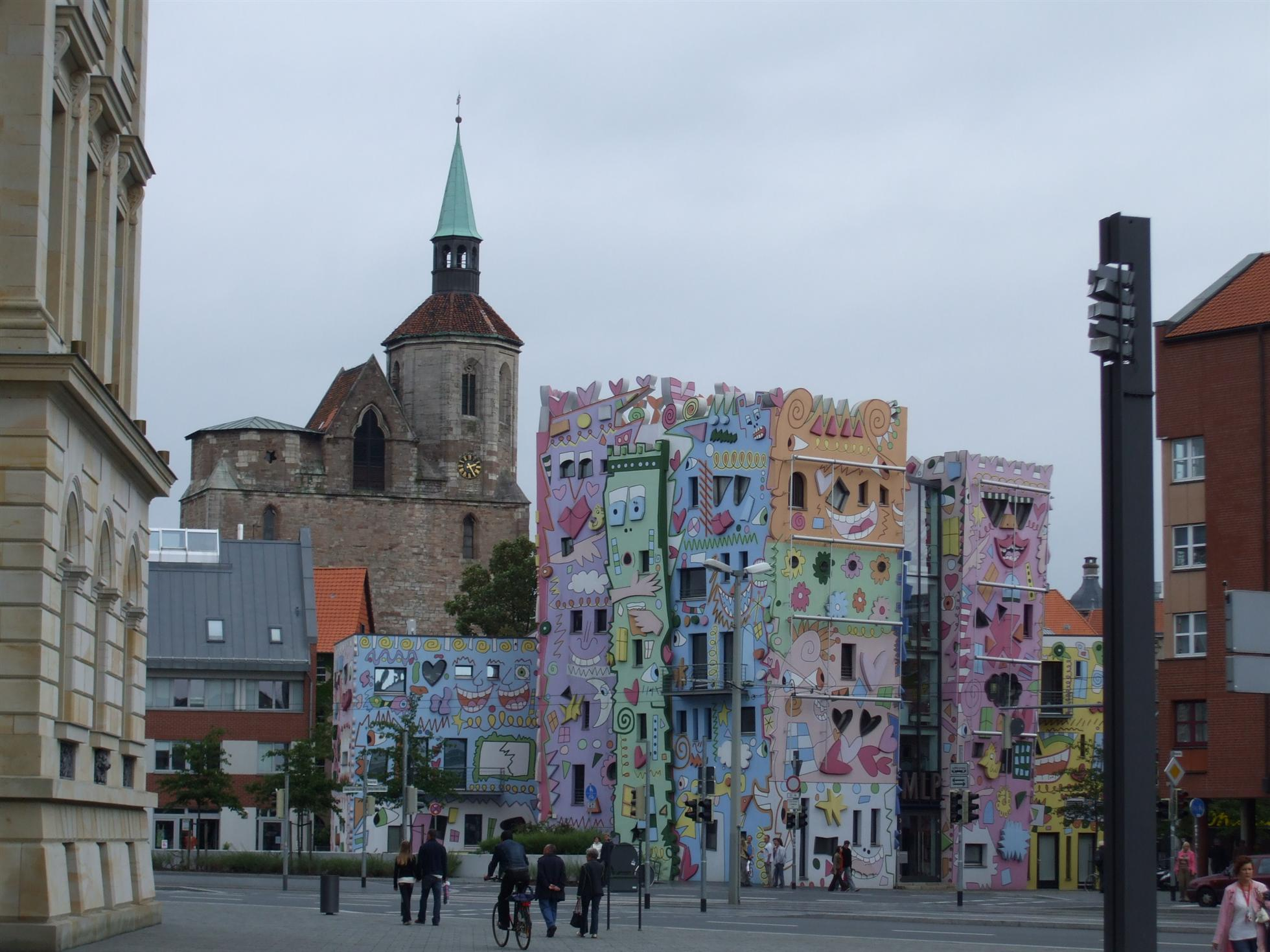
The "Happy Rizzi House" in Braunschweig, Germany.

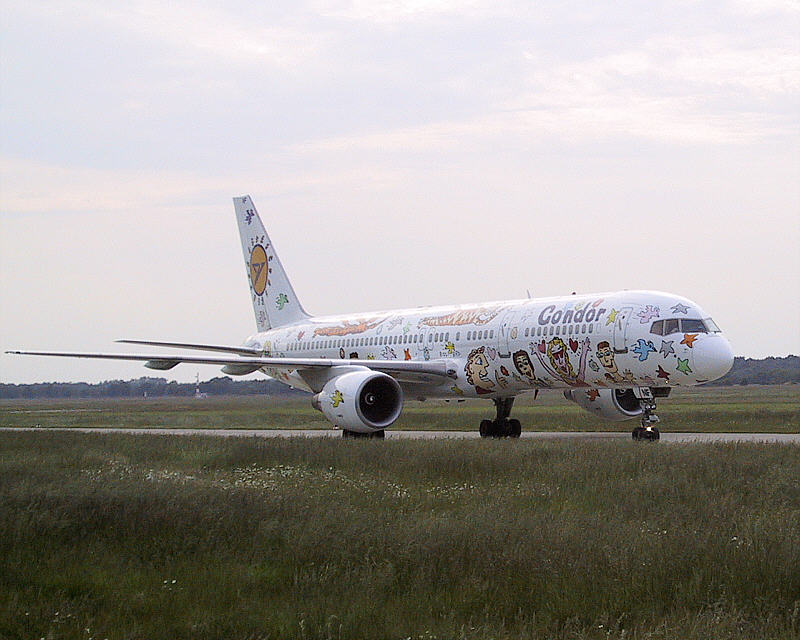
Rizzi's design on a Boeing 757, the "Rizzi Bird".

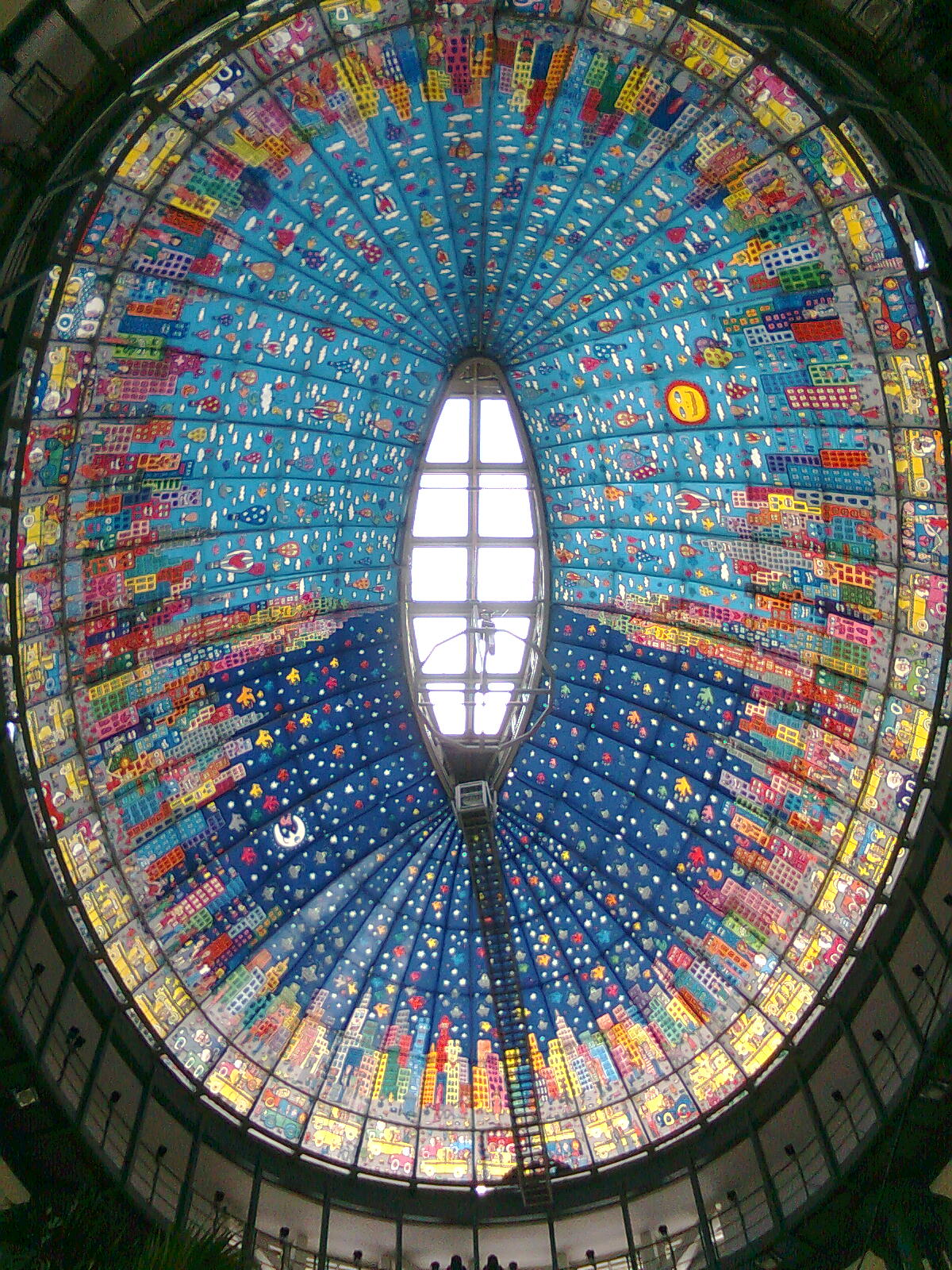
Rizzi designed dome in the CentrO shopping mall.

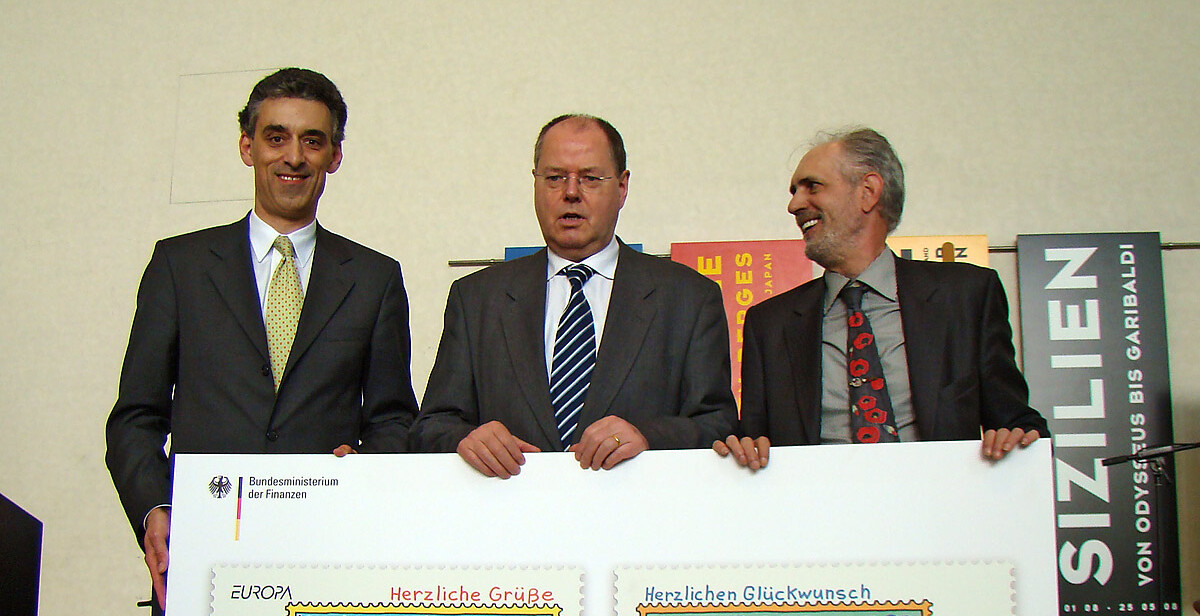
Frank Appel, Peer Steinbrück and James Rizzi at the Bundeskunsthalle in Bonn.

== Books ==
- James Rizzi: New York. Prestel 1996, ISBN 3-7913-1644-3
- James Rizzi, Peter Bührer: Mein New York Kochbuch. Hahn 1997, ISBN 3-87287-432-2
- James Rizzi, Peter Bührer: American Cookies and more. Südwest 2000, ISBN 3-517-06323-1
- James Rizzi, Glenn O`Brien: James Rizzi. Artwork 1993-2006, Art28 2006, ISBN 3-9811238-0-8
