= DieMonsterDie =

American horror punk band

Diemonsterdie

Background information
- Origin: Salt Lake City, Utah, U.S.
- Genre: Horror punk
- Years active: 1995–2020
- Label: Dr Cyclops
- Past members: Zero Delorean; Meatwhistle; Grimlock Morgue; Mercury Rising; Raven Blades; Stikki Nixx; Shadow Windhawk; Vladina Khalishnikova; LaVerne LaVey (Jimmy Scott)
- Website: diemonsterdie.com

Diemonsterdie, commonly abbreviated as DMD. is an American horror punk band based in Salt Lake City. Their name is a reference to the 1965 horror movie of the same name starring Boris Karloff.

== History ==
Originally formed in 1995 as Casa Diablo by frontman Huey "Zero Delorean" Diablo and drummer Shane "Meatwhistle" Diablo, the band released two albums before disbanding in 2000. Later that year, Delorean and Meatwhistle re-emerged as Diemonsterdie. Including the years as Casa Diablo, DMD has endured 17 years as a band, and currently have released eight full-length studio records, a limited edition split 7-inch vinyl (with fellow horror punks The Crimson Ghosts of Germany) and a live album. Reviews of DMD records have appeared in publications all over the world, most notably in the pages of Rue Morgue Magazine and on Rue Morgue Radio. The band's seventh album, Fall to Your Knees (2010), was received well and featured in a glowing review on Fear Net in November 2010.

During their long tenure, Diemonsterdie have shared the stage with fellow horror punk legends 45 Grave, The Misfits, GWAR, Type O Negative, Celtic Frost, Graves, Impaler, Lizzy Borden and Dr. Chud's X-Ward, among many others. Despite commanding a global audience of thousands and a loyal worldwide fan base, the band has never been signed to a major label. In 2003, DMD formed their own indie horror-punk label Doctor Cyclops Records, which has served as the US label not only for Diemonsterdie, but other top acts in the genre, such as the Crimson Ghosts (Germany), Left For Dead (USA), The Dead Next Door (Sweden), Others (USA) and The Nightshift (Sweden). Currently Dr. Cyclops provides digital distribution for all of these bands with exception of the Crimson Ghosts. In recent years, Dr. Cyclops Digital has also signed the up-and-coming German band, Jamey Rottencorpse and the Rising Dead. The band consists of four members; founding members, lead singer Zero Delorean and drummer Shane "Meatwhistle" Diablo and more recent additions, Mercury Rising as lead guitarist and bassist Grimlock Morgue. Past members include guitarist Shadow Windhawk and bassist Stikki Nixx. In 2012, after drifting into a status of relative obscurity since the release of the band's seventh studio album, Fall to Your Knees, DMD have since made it back into the eye of the horror punk scene and on August 11, 2012, the band successfully crowd funded a $6,000 project to release October 21st, 1976 on 12-inch limited edition vinyl in 2013. The album will feature 13 unreleased tracks celebrating 13 years since Casa Diablo transformed into Diemonsterdie and officially began defining themselves as horror punk.

2012 has also seen the revival of Diemonsterdie's free fan club, the secret order of the Zealots of the Bloody Circle. In July 2012, the band elected Steven Godfrey, an American fan from PA, as the president of the Zealots of the Bloody Circle.

It was announced via the DMD Facebook page that on March 30, 2022, Zero Delorean had died while battling an undisclosed illness.

== Members ==
=== Current lineup ===
- Zero Delorean - lead vocals, guitar (2000–2022)
- Melissa Bradford - backing vocals (2009–present)
- Trip Corvus - drums, backing vocals (2010–present)
- Grimlock Morgue - bass, backing vocals (2002–2004; 2014–present)
- Mercury Rising - guitar, backing vocals (2013–present)

=== Past members ===
- Meatwhistle - drums (2002–2010)
- LaVerne LaVey - guitar, backing vocals (2002–2004; 2008–2010)
- Stikki Nixx - bass, backing vocals (2010–2013)
- Shadow Windhawk - guitar, backing vocals (2010–2013)
- Vladina Khalishnikova - bass, backing vocals, violin (2008–2009)
- Raven Blades - bass, backing vocals (2000–2008, 2009–2010, 2013–2014)

== Discography ==
=== Albums ===
- (as Casa Diablo) The Continuing Mission to Destroy Rock N Roll (1997)
- (as Casa Diablo) No Future for the Weak (2000)
- What Is Shall Always Be (2002)
- Honor Thy Dead (2003) (re-released in '07)
- Only the Dead Will Survive (2005)
- A Great and Terrible Loss (2008)
- Sharing Prey (split 7-inch featuring the Crimson Ghosts) (2009)
- Fall to Your Knees (2010)
- October 21, 1976 (2013)

=== Compilations ===
- Triple Threat of Terror (featuring Creepersin and Others)
- Bands of Dr. Cyclops Records
- Horror of It All, Vol. 1
- Horror of It All, Vol. 2
- Horror of It All, Vol. 3
- This is Horrorpunk 2
- Bands of Horror-Punks.com
- Stay Undead, Vol. 1
- Stay Undead, Vol. 2
