= Tom Tom Club =

American rock band

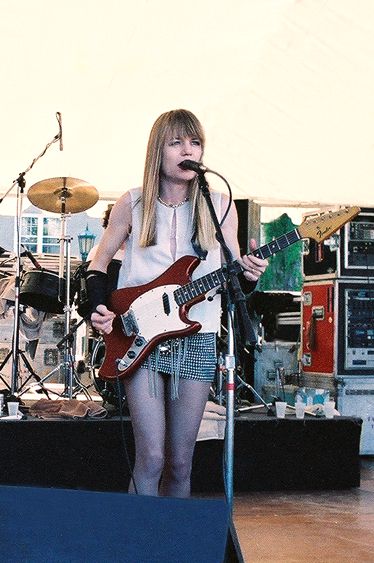
- Tina Weymouth with Tom Tom Club, 1986

Background information
- Origin: United States
- Genres: R&B; new wave; funk
- Years active: 1981–present
- Labels: Sire; Reprise; Warner Bros.; Rykodisc; Island; Fontana; PolyGram; Nacional
- Spinoff of: Talking Heads
- Members: Chris Frantz; Tina Weymouth; Bruce Martin; Victoria Clamp; Pablo Martin
- Past members: Adrian Belew; Monte Browne; Tyrone Downie; Mark Roule; Gary Pozner; Steve Scales; Steven Stanley; Alex Weir; Mystic Bowie; Fuzz Sangiovani; Laura Weymouth; Lani Weymouth; Charles Pettigrew; Wally Badarou
- Website: tomtomclub.com

Tom Tom Club is an American new wave band founded in 1981 by husband-and-wife team Chris Frantz and Tina Weymouth as a side project from Talking Heads. Their best known songs include the UK top 10 hit "Wordy Rappinghood" and the US top 40 hit "Genius of Love", both from their 1981 debut album, and a cover of The Drifters' "Under the Boardwalk" that reached the UK top 30.

== History ==
=== Formation and debut ===
Originally established as a side project from Talking Heads, Tom Tom Club comprised a loose aggregation of musicians, sound engineers, and artists of the Compass Point All Stars family, including Tina Weymouth's sisters and guitarist Adrian Belew, the latter of whom toured with Weymouth and Frantz in the expanded version of Talking Heads in 1980 and 1981. Named after the dancehall in the Bahamas where they rehearsed for the first time while on hiatus from Talking Heads in 1980, Tom Tom Club enjoyed early success in the dance club culture of the early 1980s with the hits "Genius of Love" and "Wordy Rappinghood", both of which were taken from their self-titled first album released on Sire and Warner Bros. Records in the United States and Island Records elsewhere in 1981. Despite being dismissed by Talking Heads frontman David Byrne for its more commercial direction, the album was a moderate success, peaking at No. 23 on the Billboard 200 and certified gold by the RIAA.

"Genius of Love" has been sampled or reinterpreted by many artists, including L'Trimm, Redman, Funkdoobiest, Ziggy Marley and the Melody Makers in "Tumblin' Down", the 12" Remix, and Mariah Carey in her hit single "Fantasy" as well as Mark Morrison in "Return of the Mack". "It's Nasty" (1982) by Grandmaster Flash and the Furious Five was one of the early hip-hop versions of the song; however, it was re-recorded by a live band, as interpolation and not sampling (using the actual original recording) was the more common practice at the time. Another version, "Genius Rap" (1981), by Dr. Jeckyll & Mr. Hyde, was the first cover version. Max B also sampled "Genius of Love" in his single "Get Outta Jail".

Early British pressings of the first Tom Tom Club album featured shorter versions of "Genius of Love" and "Wordy Rappinghood", but to capitalize on the club success of these songs, Island Records reissued the album with the full 12-inch versions in 1982. A new single, a cover version of The Drifters' "Under the Boardwalk", which was the group's second and final UK Top 40 hit, replaced another song "Booming and Zooming". The US version did not contain these modifications until the album was released on compact disc in the 1990s.

"Genius of Love" was featured in the 1984 Talking Heads concert film Stop Making Sense (filmed in December 1983). Frantz and Weymouth were credited as Tom Tom Club, but in this case the band was simply Talking Heads minus Byrne.

=== Close to the Bone ===
The following year, the group released a follow-up, Close to the Bone, which was similar in style to their first album but did not fare as well, though "The Man with the Four Way Hips" was a minor hit on suburban radio in the United States. The album was released on cassette and vinyl and was not released on CD until May 2009, as part of a Deluxe Edition package of Tom Tom Club's first album. The original British vinyl album was released in six different colors. One of the album's singles, "Pleasure of Love", was sampled in "Turning You On", by the Treacherous Three. As it happened with "It's Nasty", the sample was re-recorded by a live band rather than just taken from the original recording.

=== Boom Boom Chi Boom Boom and Dark Sneak Love Action ===
There was then a four-year gap until the band's next album, the first version of Boom Boom Chi Boom Boom, released in 1988. By this stage, the band's non-US deal with Island had expired and the album was released outside the United States on Fontana/PolyGram. On the album, the group adapted a more conventional rock style with a harder edged sound and a hint of menace in the lyrics of some songs. The group's line-up was also solidified along more conventional commercial lines. Whereas the previous two albums had been recorded by a loose collective of a dozen musicians, the band was now reduced to the trio of Weymouth, Frantz, and Weymouth's sister Laura Weymouth. Members Mark Roule, Gary Pozner and Victoria Clamp were part of the recording of this album and there were a number of prominent guest musicians on the record, including Lou Reed and Talking Heads' front man David Byrne on a cover of Reed's "Femme Fatale". The fourth member of Talking Heads, Jerry Harrison, also featured on some tracks. As with Close to the Bone, the album was not a commercial success although "Suboceana" received some radio play, mainly in the UK, and the single "Don't Say No" made the UK Singles Chart (Tom Tom Club's fifth, and to date final, single to do so). The album was the first Tom Tom Club album to be issued on CD and the Japanese CD version featured an added bonus track, the B-side "Devil, Does Your Dog Bite?", which was also featured on the soundtrack to the film Married to the Mob. "Suboceana" and "Don't Say No" were also remixed for dance clubs in Deep House and Acid House styles respectively by house music pioneer Marshall Jefferson in 1988.

The following year, in a bid to recapture the attention of the US market, the group and Sire Records decided to issue a radically altered version of the album in the United States. The US version of Boom Boom Chi Boom Boom replaced four songs with four others, one of which, "I Confess", was a total overhaul of the original album's "Mighty Teardrop". The four new songs, Call of the Wild, Wa Wa Dance, Kiss Me When I Get Back and I Confess were co-written by new band members Mark Roule and Gary Pozner. Notably, those songs were also produced by Arthur Baker. The running order of the rest of the album was shuffled while the artwork was revamped. However, the changes had little effect on the album's US commercial success.

In 1991, Frantz and Weymouth built the Clubhouse, a painting and music studio, over their garage near Gamecock Island, Connecticut. In 1992, they released the fourth Tom Tom Club album, Dark Sneak Love Action, which included a cover of Hot Chocolate's "You Sexy Thing". The album focused on the burgeoning techno music scene. A single, "Sunshine and Ecstasy", featured remixes by Roger Sanchez.

=== The Good, the Bad, and the Funky and present activities ===
The group's next album, The Good, the Bad, and the Funky, was released in 2000 and featured cover versions of Donna Summer's "Love to Love You Baby" and Lee "Scratch" Perry's "Soul Fire". One of the album's tracks, "Who Feelin' It", was also featured in remixed form in the soundtrack album of the 2000 film American Psycho. Among the musicians on The Good, the Bad, and the Funky are Jamaican singer Mystic Bowie, Charles Pettigrew and Toots Hibbert of Toots and the Maytals. The album's release was followed by one European and several American tours. Tom Tom Club also recorded a cover of Phish's "Sand" for a benefit CD, helping them bring in a new, jamband audience.

In 2002, Frantz and Weymouth, along with their former Talking Heads bandmates, were inducted into the Rock and Roll Hall of Fame. A complete live concert was released in 2003 on the double CD Live @ the Clubhouse, recorded at Tom Tom Club's regular hide-out studio, the Clubhouse in Connecticut, in front of an audience of fifty guests. Since then, Tom Tom Club has done incidental live shows.

In 2007, the band released a special Christmas single called "Mistletunes", containing two specially recorded Christmas songs: "Il est né" and "Christmas in the Club", which featured Mystic Bowie and scratcher/turntableist Kid Ginseng (Weymouth and Frantz's son, Robin). The single was released by Dutch indie label La La Land Records, which was founded by the former Tom Tom Club merchandise crew. In 2009, a deluxe expanded edition of the band's first album was released, with Close to the Bone added on disc 2. That marked the first time the latter was ever released on CD in its entirety. On September 28, 2010, the band released Genius of Live on Nacional Records. The album featured tracks from the album Live @ the Clubhouse as well as remix tributes of "Genius of Love" by such artists as Ozomatli, Nortec Collective, Kinky, Mexican Institute of Sound, Money Mark and The Pinker Tones.

Their first studio material in twelve years, Downtown Rockers, was released in 2012 on Nacional Records and featured guitarist Pablo Martin and keyboard player Bruce Martin.

== Discography ==
=== Studio albums ===
Year	Album	Chart positions							Certifications
Year	Album	US	US R&B	AUS	CAN	NZ	SWE	UK	Certifications
1981	Tom Tom Club: Released: June 23, 1981; Labels: Island (UK), Sire (US)	23	—	51	—	18	32	78	RIAA: Platinum
1983	Close to the Bone: Released: August, 1983; Labels: Island (UK), Sire (US)	73	49	—	96	31	42	—	
1988	Boom Boom Chi Boom Boom: Released: 1988; Labels: Fontana (UK), Sire (US)	114	—	—	60	—	—	—	
1992	Dark Sneak Love Action: Released: May 26, 1992; Labels: WEA (UK), Sire (US)	—	—	—	—	—	—	—	
2000	The Good, the Bad, and the Funky: Released: September 12, 2000; Labels: Rykodisc	—	—	—	—	—	—	—	
2012	Downtown Rockers: Released: September 4, 2012; Labels: Nacional	—	—	—	—	—	—	—	
"—" denotes releases that did not chart or were not released in that territory.

=== Live albums ===
- 2003: Live @ the Clubhouse
- 2010-09-28: Genius of Live

=== Singles ===
Year	Title	Chart positions										Album
Year	Title	US	US Dance	AUS	AUT	BEL	FRA	ITA	NL	NZ	UK	Album
1981	"Wordy Rappinghood"	102	1	44	—	1	9	18	2	35	7	Tom Tom Club
1981	"Genius of Love"	31	1	—	—	26	—	—	—	28	65	Tom Tom Club
1982	"Under the Boardwalk"	—	31	—	6	3	—	42	9	3	22	Tom Tom Club
1983	"The Man with the Four Way Hips"	106	4	—	—	—	—	—	—	—	82	Close to the Bone
1983	"Pleasure of Love"	—	23	—	—	—	—	—	—	—	—	Close to the Bone
1988	"Don't Say No"	—	—	97	—	—	—	—	—	—	79	Boom Boom Chi Boom Boom
1988	"Suboceana"	—	4	—	—	—	—	—	—	—	—	Boom Boom Chi Boom Boom
1989	"Call of the Wild"	—	—	—	—	—	—	—	—	—	—	Boom Boom Chi Boom Boom
1992	"Sunshine and Ecstasy"	—	9	—	—	—	—	—	—	—	—	Dark Sneak Love Action
1992	"You Sexy Thing"	—	—	—	—	—	—	—	—	—	—	Dark Sneak Love Action
2000	"Love to Love You Baby"	—	—	—	—	—	—	—	—	—	—	The Good, the Bad, and the Funky
2000	"Happiness Can't Buy Money"	—	—	—	—	—	—	—	—	—	—	The Good, the Bad, and the Funky
2007	"Mistletunes"	—	—	—	—	—	—	—	—	—	—	—N/a
"—" denotes releases that did not chart or were not released in that territory.

== See also ==
- List of number-one dance hits (United States)
- List of artists who reached number one on the US Dance chart
