= Chris Frantz =

American musician, drummer and record producer (b. 1951)

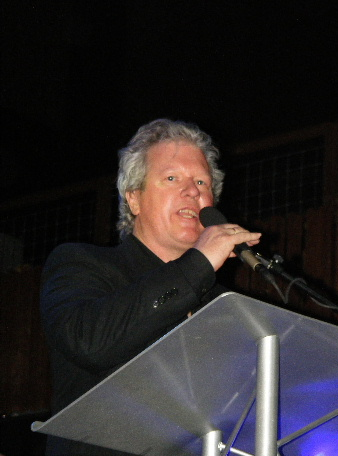
- Frantz at South by Southwest 2010

Background information
- Born: Charton Christopher Frantz; May 8, 1951 (age 75); Fort Campbell, Kentucky, U.S.
- Occupation: Drummer
- Instrument: Drums
- Member of: Tom Tom Club
- Formerly of: Talking Heads
- Spouse: Tina Weymouth (m. 1977)

Charton Christopher Frantz (born May 8, 1951) is an American musician and record producer. He is the drummer for both Talking Heads and Tom Tom Club, both of which he co-founded with wife and Talking Heads bassist, Tina Weymouth. In 2002, Frantz was inducted into the Rock and Roll Hall of Fame as a member of Talking Heads.

== Career ==
Born in Fort Campbell, Kentucky, Frantz graduated from Shady Side Academy in Pittsburgh. He studied in the early 1970s at the Rhode Island School of Design, where he met both David Byrne and Tina Weymouth. Byrne and Frantz formed a band called the Artistics, which went on to become Talking Heads, in 1973. Weymouth, then Frantz's girlfriend, joined the band in 1975 after they had moved to New York City. Frantz and Weymouth were married in 1977 and have two sons.

Frantz and Weymouth formed Tom Tom Club in 1980, when Talking Heads went on hiatus due to Byrne's solo efforts. Weymouth, Frantz, and Jerry Harrison reunited as The Heads for a one-off album called No Talking, Just Head in 1996, featuring a rotating cast of vocalists, including Debbie Harry. He and Weymouth produced the Happy Mondays' 1992 album, Yes Please! and the Scottish group Angelfish's self-titled album, in addition to producing multiple albums for Ziggy Marley and the Melody Makers. Frantz and Weymouth also contributed backing vocals and percussion for Gorillaz self-titled debut album.

He is ranked number 12 in Stylus Magazine's list of the 50 greatest rock drummers and hosts a monthly radio program, "Chris Frantz the Talking Head", on 89.5 WPKN in Bridgeport, Connecticut. Frantz and Weymouth are also closely associated with the Compass Point All Stars movement. After Phish covered Talking Heads' Remain in Light, Frantz become known as an influence on the modern jamband scene. Frantz's memoir, Remain in Love: Talking Heads, Tom Tom Club, Tina, was published in July 2020 (St. Martin's Press in the US and Faber and Faber in the UK).

== Health ==
On Memorial Day Weekend 2020, Frantz suffered a heart attack that required the insertion of three stents. In March 2022, Frantz and Tina Weymouth were in a car collision with a drunk driver.

== Discography ==
Talking Heads

- Talking Heads: 77 (1977)
- More Songs About Buildings and food (1978)
- Fear of Music (1979)
- Remain In Light (1980)
- Speaking in Tongues (1983)
- Little Creatures (1985)
- True Stories (1986)
- Naked (1988)

Tom Tom Club

- Tom Tom Club (1981)
- Close to the Bone (1983)
- Boom Boom Chi Boom Boom (1988)
- Dark Sneak Love Action (1992)
- The Good, the Bad, and the Funky (2000)
- Downtown Rockers (2012)

Appears On

- David Byrne & Brian Eno - My Life in the Bush of Ghosts (1981)
- David Byrne - Sounds from True Stories (1986)
- Robert Palmer - "Addictions" Volume 1 (1989)
- The Heads - No Talking, Just Head (1996)
- Gorillaz - Gorillaz (2001)

== Bibliography ==
- — (21 July 2020). Remain in Love: Talking Heads, Tom Tom Club, Tina (Illustrated ed.). St. Martin's Publishing. ISBN 978-1250209221. LCCN 2020002700. OCLC 1137735530. OL 28244911M.
