= Steven Stanley =

Jamaican record producer

- Born: Steven J. C. Stanley; July 11, 1958 (age 67)
- Genres: Reggae; dub; rock music
- Occupations: Engineer; record producer; keyboardist
- Instrument: Keyboards
- Years active: 1976–present
- Formerly of: Tom Tom Club

Steven J. C. Stanley (born July 11, 1958), is a Jamaican audio engineer, record producer and keyboardist who has worked in the reggae, dub and rock music genres since 1975, most notably with Talking Heads, Tom Tom Club and Black Uhuru.

Stanley began as an in-house apprentice sound engineer at Aquarius Recording Studio in Halfway Tree, Kingston, Jamaica, September 1975. An integral part of the Compass Point All Stars, he was considered a member of the 1980s new wave group Tom Tom Club, co-producing its eponymous debut album in 1981. He is credited as co-writer of "Genius of Love", one of the most sampled songs in hip hop music, having been re-interpreted by Grandmaster Flash and the Furious Five in the 1982 song "It's Nasty (Genius of Love)", and sampled by Dr. Jeckyll & Mr. Hyde, the X-Ecutioners, and on Mariah Carey's No. 1 hit "Fantasy" (1995) which earned Stanley a 1997 ASCAP Pop Award as a songwriter.

Stanley worked on the Grammy Award-winning studio albums Anthem (1984) by Black Uhuru, which he co-produced with Sly and Robbie, and Dutty Rock (2002) by Sean Paul, mixing the song "I’m Still in Love with You". Outside of the reggae genre, Stanley has also worked with Grace Jones, the Blockheads's Chaz Jankel, Lizzy Mercier Descloux, and the B-52's, receiving a Gold Album for Wild Planet (1981). He lives in Kingston, Jamaica, and works at his studio there, Steven Stanley Recording Studio.

== Discography ==
- Never Ending by Beres Hammond (2018), VP Records - Mixing Engineer
