= Tina Weymouth =

American musician, bassist, and singer-songwriter (born 1950)

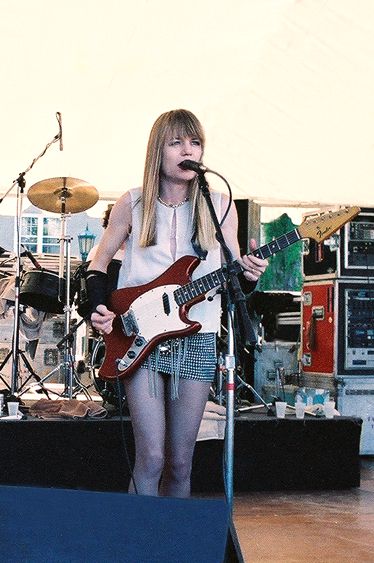
- Weymouth in Tom Tom Club (1986)

Background information
- Born: Martina Michèle Weymouth; November 22, 1950 (age 76); Coronado, California, U.S.
- Genres: New wave; funk; post-punk; art pop; art punk
- Occupations: Musician; singer; songwriter; author
- Instruments: Vocals; bass guitar; guitar; keyboards
- Years active: 1975–present
- Labels: EMI; Sire
- Member of: Tom Tom Club
- Formerly of: Talking Heads
- Spouse: Chris Frantz (m. 1977)
- Website: tomtomclub.com

External videos
- "Tina Weymouth Tribute Film, Connecticut Women's Hall of Fame

Martina Michèle Weymouth (/ˈweɪməθ/ WAY-məth; born November 22, 1950) is an American musician, singer, songwriter, and a founding member and bassist of the new wave group Talking Heads and its side project Tom Tom Club, which she co-founded with her husband, Talking Heads drummer Chris Frantz. In 2002, Weymouth was inducted into the Rock and Roll Hall of Fame as a member of Talking Heads.

== Early life ==
Weymouth was born November 22, 1950, in Coronado, California, the daughter of Laura Bouchage and U.S. Navy Vice Admiral Ralph Weymouth (1917–2020). Her mother was a French-Breton immigrant from Brittany and her father was American. Weymouth's maternal great-grandfather is Anatole Le Braz, a Breton writer. The third of eight children, her siblings include Lani and Laura Weymouth, who are collaborators in Tina's band Tom Tom Club, and architect Yann Weymouth, the designer of the Salvador Dalí Museum in Florida.

Weymouth was raised in a devout Roman Catholic family. Because of her father's military career, the family relocated frequently: When she was two years old, they moved from San Diego County to Hawaii, and later to France, Belgium, Switzerland, Los Angeles and Iceland, before eventually settling in the Washington, D.C. area. Weymouth described herself as a "very, very shy" child, which she attributed to her family's frequent relocations.

When she was 12, Weymouth joined the Mrs. Tufts’ Potomac English Hand Bell Ringers, a handbell ensemble directed by Nancy Tufts, and toured with them. At 14, she started to teach herself the guitar. Her early inspirations came from Bob Dylan and Peter, Paul & Mary.

== Career ==
=== Talking Heads ===
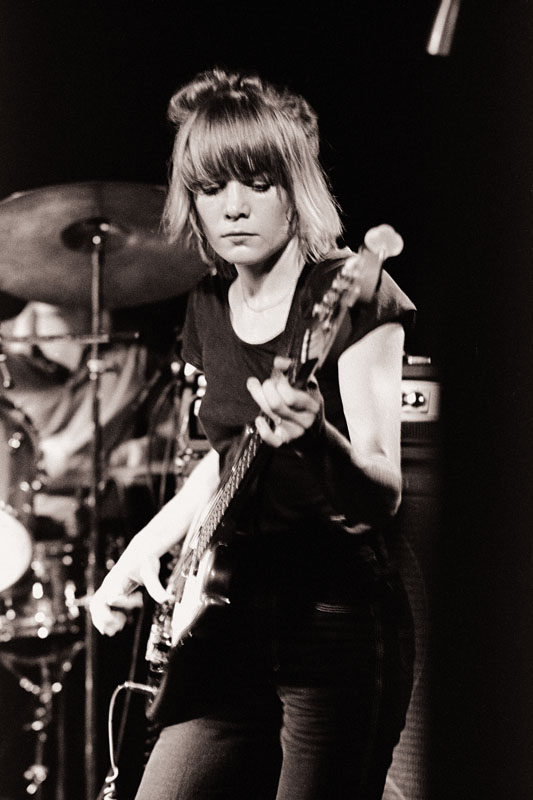
Weymouth with Talking Heads in Minneapolis, 1977

As a student at the Rhode Island School of Design, she met Chris Frantz and David Byrne, who formed a band called the Talking Heads. She began dating Frantz and served as the band's driver. After graduation, the three of them moved to New York City. Since Byrne and Frantz were unable to find a suitable bass guitar player she joined them at the latter's request and began learning and playing the instrument. As a bass player she combined the minimalist art-punk bass lines of groups such as Wire and Pere Ubu with danceable, funk-inflected riffs to provide the bedrock of Talking Heads' signature sound.

=== Other musical activities ===
Full members of the Compass Point All Stars, Weymouth and Frantz formed Tom Tom Club in 1980, which kept them busy during a fairly long hiatus in Talking Heads activity. Later on, when it became obvious that Talking Heads frontman David Byrne had no interest in making more Talking Heads albums, Weymouth, Frantz, and Jerry Harrison reunited without him for a single album called No Talking, Just Head under the name "The Heads" in 1996, featuring a rotating cast of vocalists. Weymouth has been critical of Byrne, describing him as "a man incapable of returning friendship". She co-produced the Happy Mondays' 1992 album Yes Please!, the 1994 self-titled Angelfish album featuring Shirley Manson's vocals, and in 2001 contributed backing vocals and percussion for the alternative rock virtual band Gorillaz on their track "19-2000".

Weymouth was a judge for the second annual Independent Music Awards to support independent artists' careers. She collaborated with Chicks on Speed on their cover of the Tom Tom Club's "Wordy Rappinghood" for their album 99 Cents in 2003 along with other female musicians such as Miss Kittin, Kevin Blechdom, Le Tigre, and Adult's Nicola Kuperus. The cover became a moderate dance hit in Europe, peaking at number five on the Belgian Dance Chart.

== Personal life ==
Weymouth and Chris Frantz married in 1977. The couple moved to Fairfield, Connecticut, in 1985, where they raised their two sons. Tina's niece, Katharine Weymouth, the daughter of her older brother, prominent architect Yann Weymouth, was publisher and chief executive officer of The Washington Post from 2008 until her resignation in 2014. In March 2022, Weymouth and Frantz were in a car collision with a drunk driver. Weymouth suffered a fractured sternum and three fractured ribs.

== Legacy ==
In 2020, Rolling Stone ranked her as the 29th greatest bass player of all time. Weymouth has inspired many female bassists such as Este Haim, as well as Victoria De Angelis of Måneskin.

== Equipment ==
- Höfner 500/2 Club Bass – Two pickup with single-cutaway hollowbody, purchased in 1978
- Fender Musicmaster Bass Used in early Talking Heads performances including Talking Heads: 77
- Fender Mustang Bass Used in early Talking Heads performances, seen on Saturday Night Live performance
- Veillette-Citron Standard 4 String – Neck Through, teal green
- Fender Precision Bass – Used in early Talking Heads performances
- Gibson Les Paul Triumph Bass – used in early Talking Heads performances
- Fender Jazz Bass – Used for Tom Tom Club live performances
- Steinberger L-Series Bass – Seen during Little Creatures period
- Fender Swinger Guitar – Seen in Stop Making Sense during the performance of "This Must Be the Place (Naive Melody)"
- Chapman Stick

== Sources ==
- Bowman, David (3 April 2001). "Chapter 1 – the secret life of tina weymouth". This Must Be the Place: The Adventures of Talking Heads in the Twentieth Century. New York: HarperEntertainment. ISBN 978-0-380-97846-5. LCCN 00046082. OCLC 44914246. OL 7435999M – via Internet Archive.
- Gans, David (December 1985). "Chapter One: Providence". Talking Heads: The Band & Their Music (First ed.). Avon Books. ISBN 978-0380899548. LCCN 85047829. OCLC 12938771. OL 2552512M – via Internet Archive.
- Roach, Martin (2015). Damon Albarn - Blur, Gorillaz and Other Fables. London, England: Music Press Publishing. ISBN 978-1-784-18791-0.
