= Nikka Costa discography =

- Studio albums: 8
- EPs: 4
- Singles: 27
- Video albums: 1
- Promotional albums: 4

This is the discography of American singer Nikka Costa.

== Albums ==
=== Studio albums ===
| Title | Album details | Peak chart positions | | | | | | | | | Certifications |
| Title | Album details | US | US R&B | AUS | AUT | FRA | ITA | SPA | SWI | UK | Certifications |
|---|---|---|---|---|---|---|---|---|---|---|---|
| Nikka Costa | Released: November 1981; Label: CGD, Ariola, Epic, CBS; Formats: LP, MC; Europe and South America-only release | — | — | — | — | 8 | 7 | 1 | — | — | SPA: Platinum |
| Fairy Tales | Released: 1983; Label: CGD, Ariola, Epic; Formats: LP, MC; Europe and South America-only release | — | — | — | — | — | — | 13 | — | — | |
| Here I Am... Yes, It's Me | Released: November 6, 1989; Label: Polydor; Formats: CD, LP, MC; Europe and South America-only release | — | — | — | — | — | — | — | — | — | |
| Butterfly Rocket | Released: April 10, 1996; Label: Mushroom; Fomats: CD, MC; Australia-only release | — | — | 103 | — | — | — | — | — | — | |
| Everybody Got Their Something | Released: May 22, 2001; Label: Virgin; Fomats: CD, LP, MC | 120 | 63 | 97 | 49 | — | — | — | 41 | 109 | |
| Can'tneverdidnothin' | Released: May 24, 2005; Label: Virgin; Fomats: CD, MC | 157 | 95 | — | — | — | — | — | 75 | — | |
| Pebble to a Pearl | Released: October 14, 2008; Label: Stax/Go Funk Yourself; Fomats: CD, 2xLP | 157 | 56 | — | — | — | — | — | — | — | |
| Nikka & Strings: Underneath and in Between | Released: June 2, 2017; Label: Metropolis; Fomats: CD, LP, digital download | — | — | — | — | — | — | — | — | — | |
"—" denotes releases that did not chart or were not released in that territory.

=== Promotional albums ===
| Title | Album details |
|---|---|
| Everybody Got Their Something Sampler | Released: 2001; Label: Virgin; Formats: CD; Also released with a different track listing as The Sampler |
| Return of the Funky White Bitch | Released: 2001; Label: Cheeba; Formats: CD; Features remixed versions of songs from Everybody Got Their Something, with remixes by Mark Ronson |
| Live in Tokyo | Released: 2001; Label: Virgin; Formats: CD-R; Features a performance at Astro Hall; Japan-only release |
| Pro★Whoa! | Released: 2011; Label: Go Funk Yourself; Formats: CD, 2xCD; Promo version of the EP |

=== Video albums ===
| Title | Album details |
|---|---|
| Live at the Roxy | Released: May 24, 2005; Label: Dream Merchant 21; Formats: DVD; Limited release |

== EPs ==
| Title | Album details |
|---|---|
| Live at the Bridge | Released: 1997; Label: Mushroom; Formats: CD; EP bundled with the re-released version of Butterfly Rocket |
| Stuck to You | Released: 2008; Label: Stax/Go Funk Yourself; Formats: CD; Promo remix EP |
| Pro★Whoa! | Released: June 21, 2011; Label: Go Funk Yourself; Formats: CD, digital download |
| Daytrotter Session | Released: 2012; Label: Daytrotter; Formats: digital download |

== Singles ==
| Name | Year | Peak chart positions | | | | | | | | | | Album |
| Name | Year | US Dance | AUS | BEL (FL) | FRA | GER | ITA | NLD | SPA | SWI | UK | Album |
|---|---|---|---|---|---|---|---|---|---|---|---|---|
| "(Out Here) on My Own" | 1981 | — | — | 13 | 1 | 72 | 1 | 32 | 1 | 7 | — | Nikka Costa |
| "I Believe in Love" (Brazil-only release) | 1981 | — | — | — | — | — | — | — | — | — | — | Nikka Costa |
| "You" (Spain-only release) | 1982 | — | — | — | — | — | — | — | 11 | — | — | Nikka Costa |
| "So Glad I Have You" | 1982 | — | — | — | 25 | — | — | — | — | — | — | Nikka Costa |
| "Maybe" | 1982 | — | — | — | — | — | — | — | — | — | — | Nikka Costa |
| "First Love" (Spain and Brazil-only release) | 1983 | — | — | — | — | — | — | — | 8 | — | — | Fairy Tales |
| "I Believe in Fairy Tales" | 1983 | — | — | — | — | — | — | — | — | — | — | Fairy Tales |
| "Stay Daddy Stay" | 1983 | — | — | — | — | — | — | — | — | — | — | Fairy Tales |
| "Don't Cry" (with Pierre Cosso) | 1989 | — | — | — | — | — | — | — | — | — | — | Here I Am... Yes, It's Me |
| "Renegade (Take My Breath Away)" | 1989 | — | — | — | — | — | — | — | — | — | — | Here I Am... Yes, It's Me |
| "Loca Tentación" (Spain-only release) | 1990 | — | — | — | — | — | — | — | — | — | — | Here I Am... Yes, It's Me |
| "All for the Love (Vattene amore)" (Italy and Belgium-only release) | 1990 | — | — | — | — | — | — | — | — | — | — | Non-album single |
| "Master Blaster" (Australia-only release) | 1996 | — | 126 | — | — | — | — | — | — | — | — | Butterfly Rocket |
| "Get Off of My Sunshine" (Australia-only release) | 1996 | — | 106 | — | — | — | — | — | — | — | — | Butterfly Rocket |
| "Treat Her Right" (Australia-only release) | 1996 | — | 160 | — | — | — | — | — | — | — | — | Butterfly Rocket |
| "Like a Feather" | 2001 | — | 93 | — | — | — | — | 88 | — | — | 53 | Everybody Got Their Something |
| "Everybody Got Their Something" | 2001 | — | — | — | — | — | — | — | — | — | — | Everybody Got Their Something |
| "Push & Pull" (promo-only release) | 2001 | — | — | — | — | — | — | — | — | — | — | Everybody Got Their Something |
| "I Don't Think We've Met" | 2004 | — | — | — | — | — | — | — | — | — | — | Non-album single |
| "Till I Get to You" | 2005 | — | — | — | — | — | — | — | — | — | — | Can'tneverdidnothin' |
| "Stuck to You" | 2008 | 8 | — | — | — | — | — | — | — | — | — | Pebble to a Pearl |
| "Maybe Baby" | 2008 | — | — | — | — | — | — | — | — | — | — | Non-album single |
| "Ching Ching Ching" (Germany-only release) | 2010 | — | — | — | — | 69 | — | — | — | — | — | Pro★Whoa! |
| "Little Lion Man" | 2011 | — | — | — | — | — | — | — | — | — | — | Non-album single |
| "Nothing Compares 2 U" | 2017 | — | — | — | — | — | — | — | — | — | — | Nikka & Strings: Underneath and in Between |
| "Come Rain or Shine" | 2017 | — | — | — | — | — | — | — | — | — | — | Nikka & Strings: Underneath and in Between |
| "Arms Around You" | 2017 | — | — | — | — | — | — | — | — | — | — | Nikka & Strings: Underneath and in Between |
"—" denotes releases that did not chart or were not released in that territory.
