= List of number-one albums of 1982 (Spain) =

The List of number-one albums of 1982 in Spain is derived from the Top 100 España record chart published weekly by PROMUSICAE (Productores de Música de España), a non-profit organization composed by Spain and multinational record companies. This association tracks record sales (physical and digital) in Spain.

== Albums ==
No.	Artist	Album	Reached number one	Weeks at number one
1	Miguel Ríos	Rock & Ríos	7 June 1982	13
2	Nikka Costa	Nikka Costa	1 March 1982	8
3	Mecano	Mecano	17 May 1982	6
4	Julio Iglesias	Momentos	25 September 1982	6
5	Simon & Garfunkel	The Simon and Garfunkel Collection	18 January 1982	5
6	The Alan Parsons Project	Eye in the Sky	19 July 1982	4
7	Mocedades	Amor de hombre	6 December 1982	4
8	Queen	Greatest Hits	3 May 1982	1
9	Barón Rojo	Volumen brutal	26 April 1982	1
10	Orquesta Mondragón	Bésame tonta	10 May 1982	1
11	Pecos	20 años	8 February 1982	1
12	Varios intérpretes	Juntos	11 January 1982	1
13	Adamo	Aquellas manos en tu cintura	4 January 1982	1

== See also ==
- List of number-one singles of 1982 (Spain)
