= Jamie Lidell (album) =

Studio album by Jamie Lidell
- Released: February 18, 2013
- Genre: Electronic
- Label: Warp Records
- Producer: Jamie Lidell

Jamie Lidell chronology
Compass (2010)	Jamie Lidell (2013)	Building a Beginning (2016)

Jamie Lidell is an album by Jamie Lidell released in 2013 and produced by Lidell and Justin Stanley in Lidell's Nashville, Tennessee studio. The lead single, "What a Shame," was released on YouTube on Nov 16, 2012.

Lidell cited Janet Jackson as the inspiration for the album, saying "I got into 'Rhythm Nation' and 'Control' and thought 'these are amazing songs, why don't they make them like this anymore? I want to make them like that!' So that's what kicked it off for me." Lidell added, "it’s the sound of the era I was going for, that [Janet Jackson] 'Rhythm Nation' vocal sound.”

== Reception ==
Professional ratings
Aggregate scores
Source	Rating
Metacritic	71/100
Review scores
Source	Rating
The A.V. Club	A−
AllMusic	3.5/5 stars
The Guardian	3/5 stars
The Independent	3/5 stars
NME	7/10
Pitchfork	5.6/10
PopMatters	7/10 stars
Rolling Stone	2.5/5 stars
Slant Magazine	4/5 stars
Spin	8/10

Consequence of Sound ranked the album four out of five stars, while Pitchfork gave the album a mediocre review. The album's blend of synthesized electropop and "futuristic" industrial music was praised and likened to Janet Jackson's 1986 album Control by About.com. The electronic drum intro of "Big Love" was also described as reminiscent of Jackson's hit "The Pleasure Principle."

Spin gave the album an 8 out of 10, "Though the Minneapolis Sound is new territory for Lidell, he capably imports the dweeby, self-doubting, cyborg-Lothario persona that made Multiply a hit, now with enough confidence that a song like "You Naked" hits a bullseye that earlier incarnations would’ve missed".

== Track listing ==
1. I'm Selfish - 4:54
2. Big Love - 4:44
3. What a Shame - 4:37
4. Do Yourself a Faver - 4:07
5. You Naked - 4:48
6. why_ya_why - 3:32
7. Blaming Something - 4:40
8. You Know My Name - 4:18
9. So Cold - 3:56
10. Don't You Love Me - 4:16
11. In Your Mind - 4:25

== Personnel ==
- Jamie Lidell: Vocals, vocal loops, guitar, bass, synth, synth programming, piano, horns, drum programming, percussion
- Justin Stanley: Guitar, bass, synth, drums, percussion, drum programming, horns
- James Rowland: Guitar, bass, synth, keyboards, guitar synthesizer, horns, talkbox
- (Lucky) Paul Taylor: Drums, percussion
- Brian LeBarton: Synth, bass
- Jamison Sevitts: Trumpet, tuba
- Jake Aron: Guitar
- André Vida: Synth
- Jeff Lorber: Piano
- Matt Sherrod: Drums
- Matt Chamberlain: Drums

== Charts ==
=== Weekly charts ===
Chart (2013)	Peak position
Belgian Albums (Ultratop Flanders)	13
Belgian Albums (Ultratop Wallonia)	129
Dutch Albums (MegaCharts)	64
Dutch Alternative Albums (MegaCharts)	23
Swiss Albums (Schweizer Hitparade)	66
UK Independent Albums (Official Charts)	35
US Heatseekers Albums (Billboard)	27
US Top R&B/Hip-Hop Albums (Billboard)	27

=== Year-end charts ===
Chart (2013)	Position
Belgian Albums (Ultratop Flanders)	194
