= Compass (Jamie Lidell album) =

Studio album by Jamie Lidell
- Released: May 18, 2010
- Genre: Soul, folk, blues
- Label: Warp Records
- Producer: Jamie Lidell

Jamie Lidell chronology
Jim (2008)	Compass (2010)	Jamie Lidell (2013)

Compass is a 2010 album by Jamie Lidell, released May 18. It is produced by Lidell and features additional production by Beck, Grizzly Bear's Chris Taylor, Lindsey Rome and Robbie Lackritz.

== Track listing ==
All tracks are written by Jamie Lidell, except where noted.

No.	Title	Writer(s)	Length
1.	"Completely Exposed"		3:24
2.	"Your Sweet Boom"		3:13
3.	"She Needs Me"		5:55
4.	"I Wanna Be Your Telephone"	Lidell & Snax	3:29
5.	"Enough's Enough"		2:55
6.	"The Ring"		3:44
7.	"You Are Waking"		3:42
8.	"I Can Love Again"		2:10
9.	"It's a Kiss"		3:47
10.	"Compass"		5:33
11.	"Gypsy Blood"		2:16
12.	"Coma Chameleon"	Lidell & Beck Hansen	3:20
13.	"Big Drift"	Lidell, Hansen, Leslie Feist & Lindsey Rome	4:45
14.	"You See My Light"		2:09
15.	"Completely Exposed – Heavy Ramble" (iTunes Bonus track)		8:30

Deluxe edition bonus CD
No.	Title	Length
1.	"Turn It Around"
2.	"Lies Inside"
3.	"Your Sweet Boom Dub"
4.	"Pat's Compass"
5.	"Lies Inside Cold Dub"
6.	"Enhanced: A Video Introduction To Compass"

== Reception ==
Professional ratings
Aggregate scores
Source	Rating
Metacritic	76/100
Review scores
Source	Rating
AllMusic	4.5/5 stars
BBC Music	Positive
The Boston Globe	Positive
Clash	8/10 stars
In One Ear	4/5 stars
NME	6/10 stars
NU.nl	8/10 stars
One Thirty BPM	78%
Pitchfork Media	6.6/10
Slant	4/5 stars
Spin	3.5/5 stars
Times Online	4/5 stars
Washington City Paper	Positive
XLR8R	7.5/10 stars

Compass received generally favorable reviews upon its release, earning a rating of 76 out of 100 on review aggregator website Metacritic.

== In popular culture ==
A shortened version of track 10, "Compass", was used in the 2010 action-adventure game Red Dead Redemption, published by Rockstar Games.

== Credits ==
- Jamie Lidell: Production, vocals, vocal effects, beat box, synths, Moog, piano, drum machine, guitar, tambourine, percussion, drums, mixing
- Bryan Baird (Feist): Shaker, trumpet, French horn, fugel
- Jesse Baird (Feist): Drums, percussion
- Chris Bautista: Trumpet
- Chris Bear (Grizzly Bear): Drums, percussion, tambourine
- Nikka Costa: Vocals
- Matt Demeritt: Tenor sax
- Leslie Feist: Vocals, shouts, percussion, guitar
- James Gadson (Ray Charles, Marvin Gaye): Drums, percussion
- Daniel Raymond Gahn: Drums
- Chilly Gonzales: Piano
- Beck Hansen: Production, guitar, Juno synth, vocals
- Robbie Lackritz (Feist): Production
- Brian Lebarton (Beck): Percussion, electronic drums, synth, keys, vocals
- Carlin Nicholson (Zeus): Bass
- Mike O'Brien (Zeus): Guitar
- David Ralicke: Trombone, sax
- Lindsey Rome: Production, vocals, percussion, design, photos and artwork
- Daniel Rossen (Grizzly Bear): Guitar
- Dan Rothschild: Bass
- Pat Sansone (Wilco): Wurlitzer, bass, rhodes, mellotron, percussion, gongs, celeste, vocals, mallets
- Justin Stanley (Beck): Drums, Mexican bass, percussion
- Snax: Vocals, synth
- Chris Taylor (Grizzly Bear): Production, mixing, bass, synth, guitar, bass clarinet, flute, sax
