= Jim (album) =

Studio album by Jamie Lidell
- Released: 28 April 2008
- Genre: Soul
- Length: 37:58
- Label: Warp
- Producer: Jamie Lidell, Mocky

Jamie Lidell chronology
Multiply Additions (2006)	Jim (2008)	Compass (2010)

Singles from Jim
- 1. "Little Bit of Feel Good" Released: 2008; 2. "Another Day" Released: 2008

Professional ratings
Aggregate scores
Source	Rating
Metacritic	72/100
Review scores
Source	Rating
AllMusic	3.5/5 stars
The A.V. Club	A−
Entertainment Weekly	B
The Guardian	3/5 stars
The Observer	4/5 stars
Pitchfork	7.9/10
PopMatters	8/10 stars
Slant Magazine	4.5/5 stars
URB	4/5 stars

Jim is a studio album by Jamie Lidell. It was released through Warp on 28 April 2008. It peaked at number 8 on the UK Independent Albums Chart, as well as number 183 on the Billboard 200 chart, number 7 on the Billboard Heatseekers Albums chart, and number 23 on the Billboard Independent Albums chart.

== Track listing ==
All tracks are written by Jamie Lidell and Dominic 'Mocky' Salole, except where noted.

No.	Title	Length
1.	"Another Day"	3:49
2.	"Wait for Me"	3:23
3.	"Out of My System"	3:58
4.	"All I Wanna Do"	5:13
5.	"Little Bit of Feel Good" (Lidell, Salole, Andre Vida)	4:03
6.	"Figured Me Out"	4:27
7.	"Hurricane"	3:13
8.	"Green Light" (Lidell, Salole, Jason Charles Beck)	3:49
9.	"Where D'You Go?" (Beck)	2:24
10.	"Rope of Sand"	3:39
Total length:		37:58

Limited edition bonus disc
No.	Title	Length
1.	"Multiply" ('That's Live' Multiply Sessions)	4:08
2.	"What's the Use" ('That's Live' Multiply Sessions)	4:11
3.	"What Is It This Time?" ('That's Live' Multiply Sessions)	3:04
4.	"Game for Fools" ('That's Live' Multiply Sessions)	2:29
Total length:		14:01

== Personnel ==
Credits adapted from liner notes.

- Jamie Lidell – vocals, guitar, bass guitar, keyboards, saxophone, kazoo, recorder, drums, percussion, tape
- Mocky – backup vocals, guitar, bass guitar, mandolin, keyboards, drums, percussion
- Gonzales – keyboards, drums, percussion
- Hildur Guðnadóttir – backup vocals, cello
- Linda Lee Hopkins – backup vocals
- Tatiana Heintz – backup vocals
- Joniece Jamison – backup vocals
- Nikka Costa – backup vocals
- Peaches – backup vocals
- Stuart Cole – horns
- David Ralicke – horns
- Brian LeBarton – keyboards
- David Palmer – keyboards
- Shawn Davis – bass guitar, percussion
- Bill Youngman – percussion
- Snax – drum programming

== Charts ==
Chart	Peak position
UK Independent Albums (OCC)	8
US Billboard 200	183
US Heatseekers Albums (Billboard)	7
US Independent Albums (Billboard)	23
