= Building a Beginning =

Studio album by Jamie Lidell
- Released: 14 October 2016
- Genre: Soul, electronic, experimental
- Length: 49:50
- Label: Jajulin Records
- Producer: Justin Stanley; Ben Ash

Jamie Lidell chronology
Jamie Lidell (2013)	Building a Beginning (2016)

Professional ratings
Aggregate scores
Source	Rating
Metacritic	72/100
Review scores
Source	Rating
AllMusic	4/5 stars
The A.V. Club	B+
The Guardian	4/5 stars
Pitchfork	6.2/10
PopMatters	6/10 stars

Building a Beginning is a studio album by English musician Jamie Lidell. It was released on 14 October 2016. This album marks Lidell's departure from long time label Warp. Instead, it was released on Lidell's own label Jajulin Records with distribution handled by Kobalt.

== Track listing ==
No.	Title	Length
1.	"Building a Beginning"	3:48
2.	"Julian"	3:41
3.	"I Live to Make You Smile"	3:57
4.	"Find It Hard to Say"	2:47
5.	"Me and You"	2:54
6.	"How Did I Live Before Your Love"	3:22
7.	"Walk Right Back"	3:39
8.	"Nothing's Gonna Change"	3:09
9.	"In Love and Alone"	2:48
10.	"Motionless"	3:39
11.	"Believe in Me"	3:55
12.	"I Stay Inside"	4:04
13.	"Precious Years"	4:17
14.	"Don't Let Me Let You Go"	3:46

Japanese edition bonus tracks
No.	Title	Length
15.	"Love Me Please"	3:35
16.	"You Rewind"	3:28

== Charts ==
Chart (2016)	Peak position
Belgian Albums (Ultratop Flanders)	68
Belgian Albums (Ultratop Wallonia)	176
Dutch Albums (Album Top 100)	97
