= Justin Stanley =

- Born: Sydney, New South Wales, Australia
- Genres: Rock
- Occupations: Musician; Producer; Mixer; Composer
- Instruments: keyboards drums bass piano guitar

Justin Stanley is an Australian musician, producer and songwriter.

He has worked with an eclectic range of musicians including Beck, Prince, Jimmy Cliff, Leonard Cohen, Paul McCartney and Snoop Dogg. Some of the artists Stanley had produced, include Eric Clapton, Sheryl Crow, Jet, Jamie Lidell, Nikka Costa, Jimmy Fallon, Mark Ronson, Mocky and Ryan Bingham. He lives in California, with his wife, Nikka Costa.

== Work with Beck ==
Stanley joined Beck's band in 2005 for the Guero tour, playing guitars and percussion.

He then went on to play on Beck's album, The Information, and worked with Beck on the soundtrack and score for the film Nacho Libre, starring Jack Black.

== Selected discography ==
Project	Artist	Credit	Release Date
Noiseworks	Noiseworks	Keyboards, Songwriting	1987
Touch	Noiseworks	Keyboards, Harp, Vocals, Songwriting	1988
Love Versus Money	Noiseworks	Keyboards, Vocals, Songwriting	1991
The Electric Hippies	Electric Hippies	Produced, Engineered	1994
Butterfly Rocket	Nikka Costa	Produced, Engineered	1996
Angel Blood	Leonardo's Bride	Produced	1997
Ashes	The Superjesus	Produced, Engineered	1998
Open Sesame	Leonardo's Bride	Produced	2000
Everybody Got Their Something	Nikka Costa	Produced, Engineered	2001
Highly Evolved	The Vines	Producer	2002
The Bathroom Wall	Jimmy Fallon	Drums, Keyboards, Backing vocals	2002
Bliss Descending	Jason Falkner	Mixed	2004
Playing Boyfriends and Girlfriends	Holidays on Ice	Produced, Engineered	2005
can'tneverdidnothin'	Nikka Costa	Produced, Engineered	2005
TV Eyes	TV Eyes	Mixed	2006
The Information	Beck	Electric guitar, Acoustic guitar, Background vocals, Percussion, Flute	2006
Secrets of the Lost Satellite	Ken Andrews	Guitar, bass, Synthesizer, Vibraphone, E-bow	2007
Pebble to a Pearl	Nikka Costa	Produced, Engineered	2008
Last Days at the Lodge	Amos Lee	Drums, Bass, Keys	2008
Jim	Jamie Lidell	Producer	2008
A Little Happiness	Aimee Allen	Produced	2009
Compass	Jamie Lidell	Drums, Bass, Percussion	2010
Clapton	Eric Clapton	Engineered, Mixed, Co-Produced	2010
100 Miles from Memphis	Sheryl Crow	Produced, Engineered, Mixed, Songwriting	2010
Jamie Lidell	Jamie Lidell	Produced, Guitar, Bass, Synth, Drums, Percussion, Drum programming	2013
Wise Man	The Hipstones	Producer	2014
My Life Is a Symphony	Kate Ceberano and Melbourne Symphony Orchestra	Producer	2023

== Filmography ==
Project	Credit	Release Date
Dust off the Wings	Composed, Mixed	1997
Billy Elliot	Producer, Composer	2000
Blow	Producer, mixed, composer of end credit song	2001
Zoolander	Producer of open title song	2001
Blue Crush	Producer, Composer of end credit song	2002
Slackers	Composed, Mixed	2002
The Banger Sisters	Producer, Composer	2002
Lost in Translation	Mixed additional songs	2003
Friday Night Lights	Composer, Recorded, Mixed	2004
Pretendiendo	Composer, Produced, Mixed	2006
Stranger than Fiction	Mixing	2006
Before the Music Dies	Mixing various songs	2006
30 Days of Night	Mixing	2007
The Kite Runner	Additional Mixing	2007
