= Keep Pushin' =

Keep Pushin' may refer to the title of a song.

== As a single ==
- "Keep Pushin'" by Boris Dlugosch

== From an album ==
- "Keep Pushin'" from R.E.O. (album)
- "Keep Pushin'" from Pebble to a Pearl
- "Keep Pushin'" from Silverback Gorilla
