= My Favorite Dream =

Studio album by John Legend
- Released: August 30, 2024
- Genre: Children's music
- Length: 45:03
- Labels: John Legend; Republic
- Producers: John Legend; Sufjan Stevens

John Legend chronology
Legend (2022)	My Favorite Dream (2024)	Muse (2026)

Singles from My Favorite Dream
- 1. "L-O-V-E" Released: August 9, 2024

My Favorite Dream is the first children's album and tenth studio album by American singer John Legend. It was released on August 30, 2024, through John Legend Music Inc. and Republic Records. The album includes the single "L-O-V-E". It follows up his 2022 album Legend (2022).

The album is entirely produced by Sufjan Stevens.

== Background and conception ==
My Favorite Dream marks Legend's first entry into children's music. Legend stated his idea for the album came from learning the Fisher-Price song "Maybe" on the piano. Chrissy Teigen, his spouse, uploaded a video of Legend playing and singing "Maybe" to one of their children. The warm reception from Legend's fans inspired him to start creating children's music: "I kind of took it as a challenge, not to just cover some songs kids already knew and loved, but to try to create something new. So, I wrote nine new original songs and made a whole album of it."

== Artwork ==
The album cover features a picture of Legend from his childhood, with childlike drawings in the margins.

== Promotion ==
The lead single from the album "L-O-V-E" was published on August 9, 2024.

On September 4, 2024, Legend performed "Always Come Back" on Jimmy Kimmel Live!.

On September 26, the official video for "Always Come Back" was uploaded to Legend's YouTube channel.

Legend collaborated with social media educator Ms. Rachel on a Sing-A-Longs rendition of "L-O-V-E".

== Accolades ==
In November 2024 it was announced that the album had received a nomination for Best Children's Music Album at the 2025 Grammy Awards.

== Track listing ==
All tracks are written by John Stephens, except where noted.

My Favorite Dream track listing
No.	Title	Writer(s)	Length
1.	"We're a Family"		2:43
2.	"When I Feel Sad"		2:50
3.	"Three Little Birds"	Bob Marley	3:46
4.	"L-O-V-E" (with Sufjan Stevens featuring Chrissy, Luna, and Miles)		2:32
5.	"Deep in the Ocean Blue"		2:24
6.	"For You"		1:57
7.	"You Are My Sunshine"	Charles Mitchell; Jimmie Davis	2:01
8.	"When We Fly"		3:07
9.	"Safe"		3:38
10.	"Go to Sleep"		4:00
11.	"Always Come Back"	Stephens; Leslie Bricusse; Anthony Newley	3:46
12.	"We're a Family" (solo piano)		2:39
13.	"Great, Great Day" (bonus track)	Cherilyn Pauly Neyman; Jeremy Keller	2:47
14.	"Friendship" (bonus track)	Timothy Clarke; Maggie McEwen	3:43
15.	"Maybe" (bonus track)	Jamie Hert	3:10
Total length:			45:03

== Personnel ==
Musicians

- John Legend – lead vocals (all tracks), background vocals (1, 5, 7, 8, 11), piano (7, 12)
- Sufjan Stevens – background vocals (tracks 1–11), drums, percussion, piano (1–6, 8–11); celesta (1–6, 9, 10), acoustic guitar (1–3, 5, 6), vibraphone (1, 2, 4, 9), drum machine (1, 3–6), bagpipes (1, 5, 6); alto recorder, tenor recorder (2–6, 10); sopranino recorder (2–4, 6, 10), recorder (2, 3, 5, 6, 10), ukulele (2, 9), electric guitar (3–6, 11), electric bass (3, 7, 8), banjo (3), keyboards (4); conga, drum programming (8)
- Hannah Cohen – background vocals (tracks 1–6, 8–11)
- Keenan O'Meara – background vocals (tracks 1–6, 8–11)
- Megan Lui – background vocals (tracks 1–6, 8–11)
- David Nelson – trombone (tracks 1–6, 9–11), flugelhorn (3, 4), tuba (3, 6), trumpet (4), horn (13)
- Matt Bauder – flute, tenor saxophone (tracks 1, 2, 4–6, 9, 11); baritone saxophone (1, 2, 4–6), soprano saxophone (2), alto saxophone (4–6, 9)
- David Lizmi – electric bass (tracks 1, 2, 4–6, 9), double bass (10, 11)
- Parker Kindred – drums (track 1)
- Chris Thile – mandolin (tracks 2, 9)
- Kay Manee – background vocals (tracks 3, 5, 6, 8, 11)
- Natalie Imani – background vocals (tracks 3, 5, 6, 8, 11)
- Erick Walls – acoustic guitar, electric guitar (track 3)
- Liam Cunningham – background vocals (track 3)
- Sima Cunningham – background vocals (track 3)
- Macie Stewart – background vocals (track 3)
- Kaveh Rastegar – bass (track 3)
- Munyungo Jackson – percussion (track 3)
- Sam Evian – electric guitar (tracks 4, 8)
- Chrissy Teigen – background vocals (track 4)
- Miles Stephens – background vocals (track 4)
- Luna Stephens – background vocals (track 4)
- Matt Jones Orchestra (Note: The Matt Jones Orchestra consists of conductor Matt Jones; cellists Aaron Stokes, Ro Rowan, Caleb Jones, Giovanna Clayton, Leah Metzler, and Joy Payton-Stevens; violists Thomas Lea, Stefan Smith, Kayla Cabrera, and Drew Forde; and violinists Stephanie Matthews, Daniell Adams, Adé Williams, Hwieun Kim, Kyle Gilner, Kayvon Sesar, Rhea Fowler, Clayton Penrose-Whitmore, Benjamin Jacobson, Amanda Lo, Stephanie Yu, and Hakmah White.) – chamber orchestra (tracks 8, 11)
- Hakeem Holloway – bass (track 8)
- Abby Gundersen – cello, viola, violin (track 10)
- Maeve Gilchrist – harp (tracks 10, 11)
- Sean Mullins – drums (track 11)
- Matt Jones – piano (track 11)
- Clare Manchon – background vocals (tracks 13–15), clapping (13)
- Ernestine Manchon – background vocals (tracks 13–15), clapping (13)
- Gustave Manchon – background vocals (tracks 13–15), clapping (13)
- Olivier Manchon – orchestration (tracks 13–15), background vocals (13, 15), clapping (13), keyboards (14, 15); viola, violin (14); strings, vibraphone (15)
- Gail Ann Dorsey – background vocals (track 13), bass (14)
- James McAlister – drums (tracks 13–15), percussion (14, 15)
- Thomas Deis – guitar (tracks 13, 14)
- Hideaki Aomori – woodwinds (tracks 14, 15)
- Anita Balázs – cello (track 14)
- Anthea White – background vocals (track 15)
- Mark Palmer – background vocals (track 15)
- Vicente Archer – bass (track 15)
- Jacqueline Kerrod – harp (track 15)

Technical

- Sufjan Stevens – production (tracks 1–11)
- John Legend – production (tracks 7, 12)
- Clare Manchon – production, engineering, recording arrangement (tracks 13–15)
- Olivier Manchon – production, engineering, recording arrangement (tracks 13–15)
- Dave Kutch – mastering
- Serban Ghenea – mixing
- Tim McClain – engineering
- Billy Hickey – engineering (tracks 1–3, 5–12)
- Sufjan Stevens – engineering (tracks 1–3, 5, 6, 8–11)
- Fabio Patrignani – engineering (tracks 3, 7)
- Patrick Dillon Curry – engineering (tracks 8, 11)
- Sam Evian – engineering (tracks 8, 11)
- James McAlister – engineering (tracks 13–15)
- Pete Rende – engineering (tracks 13, 15)
- Thomas Deis – engineering (tracks 13, 15)
- Alex Venguer – engineering (tracks 14, 15)
- Hideaki Aomori – engineering (tracks 14, 15)
- Gail Ann Dorsey – engineering (track 14)
- Jacqueline Kerrod – engineering (track 15)
- Kendrick Scott – engineering (track 15)
- Bryce Bordone – mixing assistance
- Matt Jones – string arrangement (tracks 8, 11)
