= Clapton (2010 album) =

2010 solo studio album by Eric Clapton

Studio album by Eric Clapton
- Released: 27 September 2010
- Recorded: 2009–10
- Genres: Rock, blues, jazz
- Length: 61:55
- Labels: Duck, Reprise
- Producers: Eric Clapton, Doyle Bramhall II, Justin Stanley

Eric Clapton chronology
Live from Madison Square Garden (2009)	Clapton (2010)	Play the Blues: Live from Jazz at Lincoln Center (2011)

Clapton is the eighteenth solo studio album by English rock guitarist and singer-songwriter Eric Clapton. It was released on 27 September 2010 in the United Kingdom and the following day in the United States.

== Background ==
The album was Clapton's first studio album in four years following his duet with J.J. Cale in The Road to Escondido (2006), and is made up of a mix of new material and cover songs. Clapton has played tracks off this album such as "Rocking Chair" and "When Somebody Thinks You're Wonderful" live on tour. Clapton has said, "This album wasn’t what it was intended to be at all. It's actually better than it was meant to be because, in a way, I just let it happen."

== Chart performance ==
Clapton debuted at number seven on the UK Albums Chart, his highest-charting album on the chart since Reptile from 2001. In the United States it entered the Billboard 200 at number six, selling 47,000 copies in its first week on the chart. The album reached top five positions in Austria, Denmark, Germany, Norway, Spain, Sweden and Switzerland.

== Critical reception ==
Professional ratings
Aggregate scores
Source	Rating
AnyDecentMusic?	6.1/10
Review scores
Source	Rating
Allmusic	4.5/5 stars
Billboard	(favourable)
Entertainment Weekly	C
Los Angeles Times	3.5/4 stars
PopMatters	6/10 stars
Rolling Stone	4/5 stars

According to review aggregator Metacritic, Clapton received an average of 72 out of 100 indicating generally favourable reviews from music critics, based on ten critiques. In his review of Clapton for Allmusic, Stephen Thomas Erlewine said that "there's no record quite like Clapton in Eric Clapton's catalog," and goes on to say that the album "flows easy, the blues never hitting too hard, the New Orleans jazz never getting too woozy, the standards never too sleepy, the sounds subtly shifting but changing all the same." In David Fricke's review for rollingstone.com he called Clapton, "a serenely masterful engagement with roots – the guitarist co-wrote just one original – that is all over the place in repertoire yet devoutly grounded in its roaming. Irving Berlin's "How Deep Is the Ocean" comes with an earnest, sandy Clapton vocal and lighthouse beams of trumpet by Wynton Marsalis. Little Walter's "Can't Hold Out Much Longer" has the crusty flair of Clapton's 1965 and '66 recordings with John Mayall. A pair of Fats Waller romps are decked out in New Orleans brass and pianos, one of them played by Allen Toussaint."

=== Grammy Awards ===
The track "Run Back to Your Side" was nominated for Best Solo Rock Vocal Performance at the 53rd Annual Grammy Awards, held on 13 February 2011.

== Track listing ==
No.	Title	Writer(s)	Length
1.	"Travelin' Alone"	Lil' Son Jackson	3:56
2.	"Rocking Chair"	Hoagy Carmichael	4:04
3.	"River Runs Deep"	J.J. Cale	5:52
4.	"Judgement Day"	Snooky Pryor	3:13
5.	"How Deep Is the Ocean"	Irving Berlin	5:29
6.	"My Very Good Friend the Milkman"	Lyrics: Johnny Burke, Music: Harold Spina	3:20
7.	"Can't Hold Out Much Longer"	Walter Jacobs	4:08
8.	"That's No Way to Get Along"	Robert Wilkins	6:07
9.	"Everything Will Be Alright"	J.J. Cale	3:51
10.	"Diamonds Made from Rain"	Doyle Bramhall II, Nikka Costa, Justin Stanley	4:23
11.	"When Somebody Thinks You're Wonderful"	Harry M. Woods	2:51
12.	"Hard Times Blues"	Lane Hardin	3:45
13.	"Run Back to Your Side"	Bramhall, Clapton	5:17
14.	"Autumn Leaves"	Joseph Kosma, Johnny Mercer, Jacques Prévert	5:40

ericclapton.com Deluxe Limited Edition bonus track
No.	Title	Length
15.	"You Better Watch Yourself"

Barnes & Noble and Best Buy bonus track
No.	Title	Length
15.	"Take a Little Walk with Me"

iTunes bonus track
No.	Title	Length
15.	"I Was Fooled"

Amazon.com bonus track
No.	Title	Length
15.	"Midnight Hour Blues"

== Personnel ==
Performers

- Eric Clapton – vocals, guitar, mandolin (12)
- Doyle Bramhall II – guitar (1, 4, 7, 10, 12, 13, 15), vocal arrangement (4), hi-hat (7), guitar solo (8, 12), percussion (8), vocals (10)
- Derek Trucks – slide guitar (2), guitar (3)
- J. J. Cale – guitar (3, 8), vocals (3, 8, 9)
- Greg Leisz – pedal steel guitar (3)
- Walt Richmond – Hammond organ (1), acoustic piano (2, 4–15), Wurlitzer electric piano (3), keyboards (14)
- James Poyser – Hammond organ (3, 8)
- Allen Toussaint – acoustic piano (6, 11)
- Steve Riley – accordion (8)
- Paul Carrack – Hammond organ (9)
- Sereca Henderson – organ (10)
- Willie Weeks – bass guitar (1, 4, 8, 9, 10, 13), double bass (2, 3, 5, 7, 12, 14, 15)
- Chris Severan – double bass (6, 11)
- Jim Keltner – drums (1, 4, 5, 7, 8, 10, 12, 13), percussion (1, 8, 12, 13)
- Abe Laboriel Jr. – drums (2, 14)
- Jeremy Stacey – drums (3, 10)
- Justin Stanley – drums (3), additional percussion (8), horn arrangements (10)
- Herman Labeaux – drums (6, 11)
- Cayetano "Tanio" Hingle – bass drum (6, 11), cymbal (6, 11), clarinet (8)
- Jason Moeller – drums (15)
- David Guy – horn arrangements (3)
- Neal Sugarman – tenor saxophone (3)
- Leon Michaels – trumpet (3)
- Thomas Brenneck – horns (3)
- Kim Wilson – harmonica (4, 7, 15)
- Wynton Marsalis – trumpet (5, 6, 11)
- Troy Andrews – trombone (6, 11), trumpet (6, 11), bass drum (8)
- Matt Pyreem – tuba (6, 11)
- Michael White – clarinet (6, 11)
- Clarenee Slaughter – baritone saxophone (8)
- Bruce Brackman – sousaphone (8)
- Edward Lee – tenor saxophone (8)
- Tim Callagan – trombone (8), trumpet (8)
- Dan Ostreicher – horns (8)
- Sherrell Chenier Mouton – washboard (8)
- Tim Izo Orindgreff – saxophone (9, 10)
- Elizabeth Lea – trombone (9, 10)
- Printz Board – trumpet (9, 10)
- Nick Ingman – string arrangements (1–9, 11–14), conductor
- Patrick Warren – string arrangements (10)
- The London Session Orchestra – strings (3, 5, 9, 10, 14)
- Perry Montague-Mason – concertmaster
- Nikka Costa – backing vocals (2, 10, 13)
- Terry Evans – backing vocals (4, 8)
- Willie Green Jr. – backing vocals (4, 8)
- Arnold McCuller – backing vocals (4, 8)
- Lynn Mabry – backing vocals (10, 13)
- Debra Parsons – backing vocals (10, 13)
- Sheryl Crow – vocals (10)
- Arnold Kłymkiw – vocals (15)

Production

- Producers – Eric Clapton, Doyle Bramhall II, Justin Stanley (Track #10).
- Engineer and Mixed by Justin Stanley
- Recorded at Ocean Way Recording (Hollywood, CA) and Piety Street Recording (New Orleans, LA).
- Mastering – Gavin Lurssen at Lurssen Mastering (Hollywood, CA).
- Photography – Doyle Bramhall II (recording studio), Nigel Carroll (recording studio), Terry O'Neill (front and back), Gregory Malphurs (guitars).
- Design – Stephen Walker
- Production Coordinator – Debbie Johnson

== Chart positions ==
=== Weekly charts ===
Chart (2010–14)	Peak position
Australian Albums (ARIA)	21
Austrian Albums (Ö3 Austria)	5
Belgian Albums (Ultratop Flanders)	16
Belgian Albums (Ultratop Wallonia)	8
Canadian Albums (Billboard)	7
Croatian International Albums (HDU)	1
Czech Albums (ČNS IFPI)	3
Danish Albums (Hitlisten)	3
Dutch Albums (Album Top 100)	9
European Albums (Billboard)	3
Finnish Albums (Suomen virallinen lista)	16
French Albums (SNEP)	10
German Albums (Offizielle Top 100)	3
Greek Albums (IFPI)	36
Hungarian Albums (MAHASZ)	6
Irish Albums (IRMA)	20
Italian Albums (FIMI)	6
Japanese Albums (Oricon)	8
Mexican Albums (Top 100 Mexico)	73
New Zealand Albums (RMNZ)	11
Norwegian Albums (VG-lista)	5
Polish Albums (ZPAV)	7
Russian Albums (2M)	7
Scottish Albums (Official Charts)	6
Spanish Albums (Promusicae)	5
Swedish Albums (Sverigetopplistan)	5
Swiss Albums (Schweizer Hitparade)	4
UK Albums (Official Charts)	7
US Billboard 200	6
US Digital Albums (Billboard)	9
US Top Album Sales (Billboard)	6
US Top Internet Albums (Billboard)	1
US Top Rock Albums (Billboard)	1
US Indie Store Album Sales (Billboard)	3

=== Year-end charts ===
Chart (2010)	Position
Austrian Albums (Ö3 Austria)	132
Danish Albums (Hitlisten)	48
Dutch Albums (MegaCharts)	76
European Albums (Billboard)	72
German Albums (Offizielle Top 100)	69
Swiss Albums (Schweizer Hitparade)	118
UK Albums (OCC)	197

== Certifications ==
Sales certifications for Clapton
Region	Certification	Certified units/sales
Brazil (Pro-Música Brasil)	Gold	20,000^{*}
Canada	—	5,100
Denmark (IFPI Danmark)	Gold	10,000^{‡}
Germany (BVMI)	Gold	100,000^{^}
Poland (ZPAV)	Gold	10,000^{*}
United States	—	215,000
^{*} Sales figures based on certification alone.^{^} Shipments figures based on certification alone.^{‡} Sales+streaming figures based on certification alone.
