= The Hipstones =

- The Hipstones (left to right): Anthea White (vocals), Mark Palmer (keys) and house band, performing live at Venue 505, January 2014 in Sydney

Background information
- Origin: Sydney, New South Wales, Australia; Brooklyn, New York City, New York
- Genres: Soul, funk, jazz, electronic
- Years active: 2006–present
- Label: Independent
- Members: Anthea White - Vocals; Mark Palmer - Piano/Vocals; Chris Tarry - Bass; Jordan Perlson - Drums; Tim Stocker - Baritone Sax; Dylan Heaney - Tenor Sax; Josh Deutsch - Trumpet
- Website: thehipstones.com.au

The Hipstones are an Australian/American seven-piece soul, jazz and funk musical group that formed in 2006. Their music is unique in the sense that it fuses traditional soul-like song structures with elements of electronic music (notably vocoders and synthesizers), and vocal harmonies. The band consists of two permanent members, Mark Palmer and Anthea White, with a rotating ensemble of other jazz and soul musicians based in both Sydney and New York. Mark Palmer is also a member of New York band Wheatus, best known for their 2000 single "Teenage Dirtbag" which was featured in the movie Loser, as well as in the HBO miniseries Generation Kill.

== History ==
The band was formed in 2006, by Mark Palmer and Anthea White, during a six-month contract gig at the Tokyo Hilton in Shinjuku, Japan. The couple then moved to Sydney, Australia where they formed a 10-piece band and began recording their first album, Something's Gonna Start.

Prior to the release of their second album, Dreamers, in 2009, the band moved to Brooklyn, New York to both develop their musical style and take advantage of the city's vibrant original music scene.

The band is now permanently based in New York City.

The Hipstones' third album Wise Man was funded by the band's fans through crowd sourcing. The album was produced by Justin Stanley, who has also produced for Nikka Costa, Sheryl Crow, Jamie Liddel and Chaka Chan. It was to be released in mid-2014.

== Style ==
The band's music spans a variety of tempos and styles. Performances see the band fuse traditional jazz, soul and funk with a variety of other alternative including beat-boxing, voice modulation and Oud.

Michael Smith of Drum Media, said that "tonally White is closer to the glistening dulcet tones of local pop diva Abby Dobson than the edgy growl of the classic soul queens, but that merely adds an evocative ache to songs like Revolution."

== Members ==
The Hipstones' band is generally composed of a bass player, drummer, a string section, and horn section.

=== Permanent Members ===
- Anthea White (Vocals/Modulation)
- Mark Palmer (Vocals/Keys/Modulation)

=== Current Collaborators ===
Live performance make up varies depending on location and set list.

- Victor Rounds (Bass)
- Tim Firth (Drums)
- Matt Ottignon (Saxophone)
- Joy Yates (Backing Vocals)
- Virna Sanzone (Backing Vocals)

=== Past Collaborators ===
- Jackie Orszaczky (Vocals/Bass/Piano)

== Influences ==
During an interview for Jamsphere, Anthea said that the band was strongly influenced by classic American RnB, soul and funk artists, including, Donny Hathaway, Stevie Wonder, Aretha Franklin, Ray Charles, and Roberta Flack. She also cited more modern artists including Erykah Badu, and D’Angelo, as having strong influences on the band's sound.

== Discography ==
=== Albums ===
- Something's Gonna Start (2007)
- Dreamers (2009)
- Wise Man (2014)

=== Singles ===
List of singles, showing year released and album name
Year	Single	Peak chart positions		Album
Year	Single	AUS	AUS Indie	Album
2014	"Wise Man"	–	–	Wise Man
