= Josh Deutsch =

American trumpet player and composer

- Born: Seattle, Washington, U.S.
- Genres: Jazz
- Occupations: Musician, composer
- Instrument: Trumpet
- Years active: 2011 - present

Josh Deutsch is an American jazz musician and composer. Primarily known as a trumpet player, he is a founding member of the Queens Jazz Overground, leads the band Pannonia and the Josh Deutsch Quintet, is a member of the Grammy-nominated Terraza Big Band, and performs regularly in a duo with guitarist Nico Soffiato. Deutsch is also an educator, who has taught privately and at various institutions including the Queens College CPSM and the University of Oregon, as well as mentoring at the Young Composers and Improvisors Workshop. He has toured extensively throughout North America, Europe and Asia during his career.

== Early life and education ==
Deutsch was born and raised in Seattle. He began playing piano and composing music at the age of five, then added the trumpet in middle and high school. He received his bachelor's degree in Jazz Studies from the New England Conservatory of Music, where he studied with Danilo Pérez, Bob Brookmeyer, John McNeill, Allan Chase and composer Lee Hyla. Deutsch received his Masters of Music in Jazz Performance and Composition in 2009 from the University of Oregon.

== Performing & Recording ==
Deutsch is the leader of the band Pannonia, which he formed in 2011 and whose debut recording, Another Time, Another Place was released in 2014. Downbeat named it a January 2014 editors pick and notes: "This well-planned, beautifully executed program draws on influences from practically everywhere. Deutsch seems to be obsessive on details, and he’s hell-bent on making music that’s just a little (or perhaps a *lot*) different than what you’ve heard before." Deutsch also performs in a duo with guitarist Nico Soffiato that has toured extensively in Italy and the United States. Guitar International hailed their recording Time Gels (2011) as "an elegant, fresh take on the timeless (duo) tradition" and praised the duo's ability to "perform as a cohesive unit with improvisational vigor and mature musicianship." Deutsch and Soffiato host the 2x3 Series, presenting a trio of diverse duos in a night of separate and collaborative performances at various NYC venues. The trumpeter also plays regularly and has recorded with Argentinian singer/composer Sofia Rei, Pedro Giraudo's Expansions Big Band, the Australian soul/funk band The Hipstones and Nathan Parker Smith's Large Ensemble. Deutsch has also performed with Michael Bates' Outside Sources and the Duke Ellington Big Band directed by Victor Goines. He has presented his own projects at Dave Douglas's Festival of New Trumpet Music as well as at the Earshot Jazz Festival in Seattle and the Outpost Summer Music Festival in Albuquerque and has appeared in the U.S. at The Jazz Gallery and The Stone in New York City and at Yoshi's in Oakland, among other locations.

== Teaching ==
Deutsch has appeared as a clinician and conducted master classes throughout the U.S. He was on the faculty of the Oregon Festival of American Music's Summer Jazz Academy from 2007 through 2009 and of the University of Oregon Summer Jazz Camp from 2007 to the present. In 2008, he received the Excellence in Teaching Award from the University of Oregon for his work with large and small jazz ensembles and private improvisation students. He currently offers private instruction in trumpet, piano, improvisation, composition and music theory in New York City where he is on the faculty of the Queens College CPSM and a mentor in the Young Composers and Improvisors Workshop.

== Composing ==
Deutsch writes music in multiple genres and his compositions and arrangements have been performed by artists ranging from the Seattle Symphony Orchestra and cellist Ruth Marshall to the Oregon Jazz Ensemble, Ron Miles and Danilo Pérez. He has received commissions from the NPR radio program From The Top, the Seattle Symphony Orchestra, Music Northwest and the Head-Royce School. In addition to having composed hundreds of pieces for various performing ensembles, Deutsch has also written several long-form pieces including "The Ligeti Project," a 12-movement, cross-genre work for jazz septet that has been performed on both the East and West Coasts that is based loosely on György Ligeti's Musica Ricercata.

== Discography ==
=== As a leader/co-leader ===
- Josh Deutsch/Nico Soffiato, Redshift (nusica.org, 2020)
- Pannonia, Another Time, Another Place (Alternate Side Records, 2014)
- Josh Deutsch/Nico Soffiato, Time Gels (2011)
- Four Across, Four Across (8bells/Circavision, 2008)
- The Poisonous Birds, Live @ Jo Fed's (2008)

=== As a sideman ===
- Sofia Rei, De Tierra y Oro (Cascabelera/Lillihouse, 2012)
- Brian Adler, Helium Music Project (Circavision, 2013)
