= Like a Feather =

Single by Nikka Costa

from the album Everybody Got Their Something
- B-side: "Heaven Sinner"
- Released: July 30, 2001
- Genre: Jazz; funk; rock; technofunk; rock and roll; hip-hop
- Length: 3:55
- Label: Virgin; Cheeba Sound
- Songwriter(s): Nikka Costa; Justin Stanley; Mark Ronson
- Producer(s): Costa; Stanley; Ronson; Dominique Trenier

Nikka Costa singles chronology
"Treat Her Right" (1996)	"Like a Feather" (2001)	"Everybody Got Their Something" (2001)

Music video
- "Like a Feather" on YouTube

"Like a Feather" is a song by the American pop/soul singer Nikka Costa, released as the first single from her 2001 album Everybody Got Their Something.

== Release and reception ==
Professional ratings
Review scores
Source	Rating
NME	3.5/5 stars

"Like a Feather" was released as the first single from Costa's 2001 album Everybody Got Their Something. It was ranked the seventeenth best song of 2001 by SPIN magazine. Due to its use in advertisement campaigns for Tommy Hilfiger, it managed to obtain a viewer impression number of 530 million.

== In popular culture ==
"Like a Feather" was used in many of Tommy Hilfiger's advertisement campaigns, which has been claimed to be the cause of Costa's success in the United States.

== Awards and accolades ==
The music video for "Like a Feather" was nominated for "Best new-artist clip of the year" in the modern rock and pop genres for Billboard's Music Video Awards.

== Charts ==
Weekly chart performance for "Like a Feather"
Chart (2001)	Peak position
Australia (ARIA)	93
Netherlands (Single Top 100)	88
UK Singles (OCC)	53
