= Shunda K =

American rapper

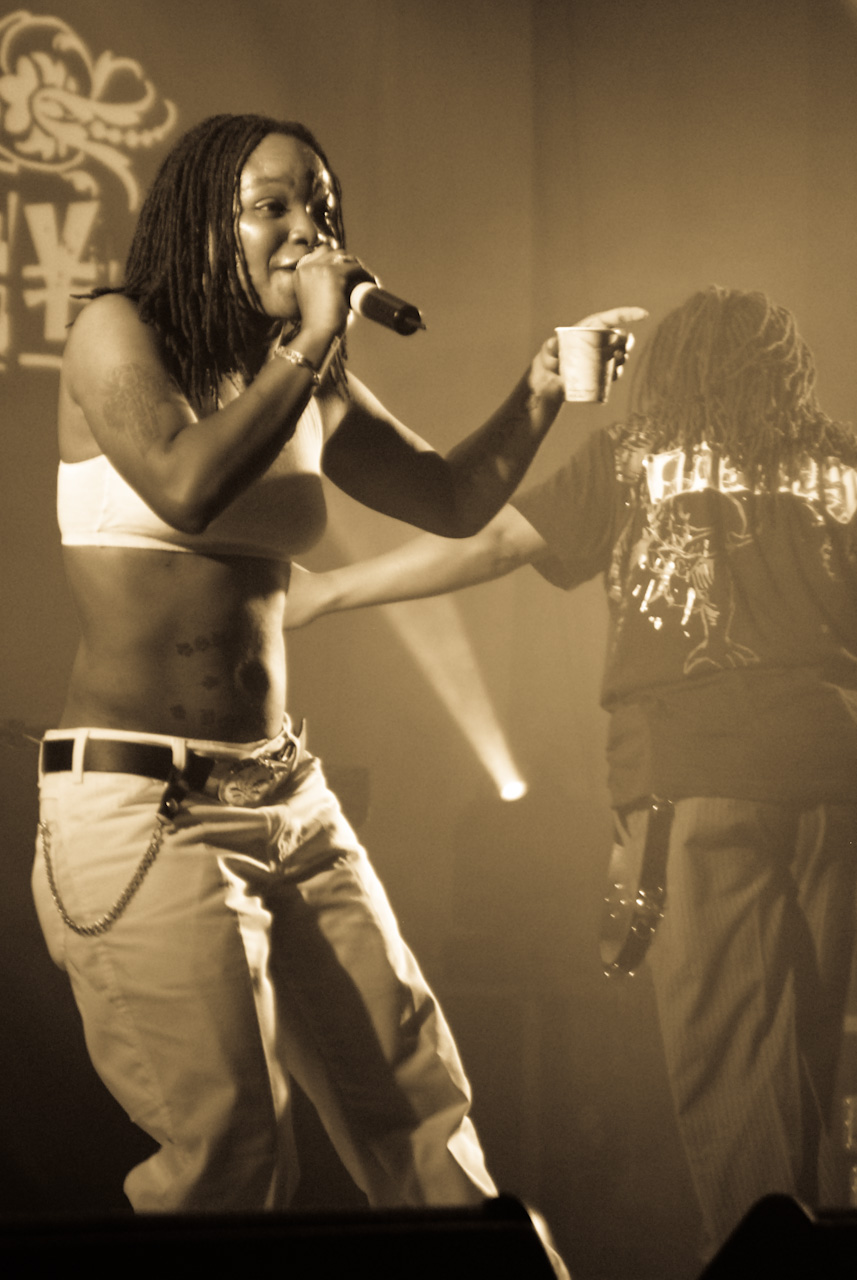
- Sonar 2008 – Barcelona – Shunda K

Background information
- Also known as: Shunda K
- Born: Lashunda Nicole Flowers; August 3, 1980 (age 46)
- Origin: Tampa, Florida, U.S.
- Genres: Hip hop, electroclash
- Occupations: Singer, songwriter
- Years active: 1998–present
- Label: GMEQCA/Matriarch Records
- Website: https://shundak.com/

Lashunda Nicole Flowers, better known as Shunda K, is an American rapper whose songs are noted both for their use of spiritual and sexually explicit lyrics.

== Current ==
With her release of "The Return of Shunda K" EP in 2019, Shunda K is set to drop her sophomore album "Return of The Dragon / Rise of The Divine Feminine" June 6, 2022. The double album features 26 tracks featuring producers such as Thunderbird Juiceboxx, Tori Fixx aka DJ Naughtboyy, Koax The Droid and newcomer DJ Ambs. Her new label GMEQCA/Matriarch Records is finding success in the digital market, where Shunda K will release "soul stirring" tunes, featuring top producers worldwide.

=== Yo Majesty 1998–Current ===
Shunda K started her career with Shon B as a duo named Ya Majesty before they were rounded out circa 2001 by gospel-raised vocalist Jwl B. They started collaborating with London-based electronica duo HardfeelingsUK (David Alexander and Richard Winstanley), who supplied the newly named Yo! Majesty with their electro-rap club beats, in 2002. Once they established a name for themselves on the underground club circuit, both in the US and the UK, Yo Majesty self-released their first official release, the Yo EP, in 2006.

They "made a splash" at SXSW in 2007 and that year toured alongside CSS and the Gossip. The group signed with Domino Records in 2007, and the label released an EP and full-length record by the band in 2008, which included a track produced by Basement Jaxx. Shon B left in 2008, soon after the group was signed, leaving Shunda and Jwl to tour as Yo Majesty. However, during January 2009 Shunda K was forced to finish the Yo Majesty tour solo as Jwl B was incarcerated as she assaulted a family member. When Jwl B was released, Domino forced Shunda to tour with her, so Shunda left the group and pursued solo interests.

=== Solo career ===
After leaving Yo Majesty, Shunda has gone on to work with Peaches on her I Feel Cream, collaborating on the track and starring in the music video for Billionaire, and released a series of EPs with French producer Flore and Damp Heat all the while steadily working on her album which is set for release under Fanatic Records on January 11, 2011. She began 2010 by touring in Australia, performing at the roving Big Day Out festival, headlining club gigs and opening shows for friend Peaches.

Shunda's first maxi-single off her next album The Most Wanted, "Here I Am to Save the World", was released on July 27, 2010. It was co-producedby French electronic dance music producer Electrosexual and Chicago based label owner Chrissy Murderbot. It features remixes of the album version by several up and coming producers.

The second maxi-single from The Most Wanted was "I'm da Best" and was released on October 25, 2010. The song is the reunion on record with original Yo! Majesty member Shon B, notable for the fact that it was Shunda K and Shon B that appear on the original version of "Club Action" that brought Yo! Majesty its initial round of attention. The maxi-single again features multiple remixes by many new producers from around the world.

Also of note is Shunda's collaboration with musician/producer Snax, "It's Time to Get Paid." The music video for the song, directed by Robin Thompson, quickly garnered hundreds of thousands of views on YouTube (686,722 as of this writing), prompting positive comments as well as many homophobic and racist ones. Snax responded to the reaction in an article in the Huffington Post.

== Discography ==
=== Albums ===
- Futuristically Speaking...Never Be Afraid (as Yo Majesty) (2008), Domino Records
- The Most Wanted (as Shunda K) (2011), Fanatic Records
- Return of The Dragon / Rise of The Divine Feminine (as Shunda K) (2022), GMEQCA/Matriarch Records

=== EP ===
- "The Return of Shunda K" (2019, GMEQCA/Matriarch Records)

=== Singles ===
- "Here I Am to Save the World" (2010, Fanatic Records)
- "I'm da Best" (2010, Fanatic Records)

=== Collaborations ===
- Shunda K (Yo Majesty) and Electrosexual collaborated on the track "Screaming and Crying" alongside Scream Club which features on Electrosexual's 12" vinyl "Break You Nice/Screaming and Crying".
- Shunda K (Yo Majesty) collaborated with Snax on the track "It's Time to Get Paid" released on Shunda's LP The Most Wanted.
- Shunda K (Yo Majesty) and Peaches collaborated on the track "Billionaire" which features on Peaches' album I Feel Cream.
- Shunda K and Flore worked together on each other's album with Flore's album Raw. Two singles have been released preceding the album, both featuring Shunda K's vocals.
- Shunda K and Damp Heat released an EP together to round out 2009.
- Yo Majesty and Neon Neon worked on the track "Sweat Shop" for their album Stainless Style.
