= Yo Majesty =

American hip hop group

Yo! Majesty
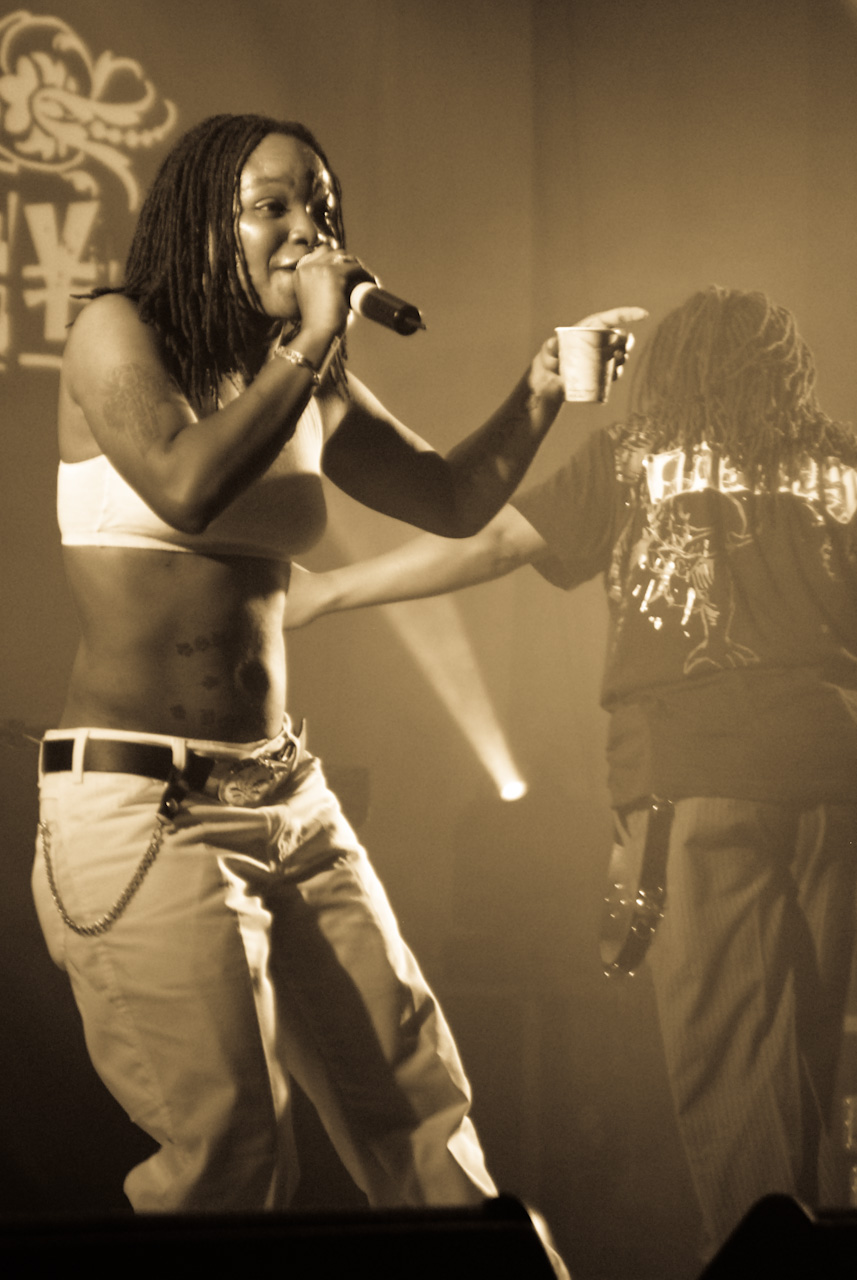
- Yo! Majesty's Shunda K performing at Sonar 2008, Barcelona, Spain

Background information
- Origin: Tampa, Florida, U.S.
- Genres: Dirty rap, alternative hip hop, electro
- Label: GMEQCA/Matriarch Records
- Members: Shunda K Shon B
- Website: yomajesty.bandcamp.com/music

Yo! Majesty is an American hip hop group consisting of singer and rappers Shunda K and Shon B, produced by UK-based electro group HardfeelingsUK.

Yo! Majesty was mentioned as one of the 'Top 11 new bands of 2008' by NME magazine as well as one of the '25 Most Exciting Bands in America'.

== Biography ==
Yo! Majesty's current members are W, Shon Burt, stage name Shon B, and LaShunda Flowers, known as Shunda K. The group members are openly lesbian and self-identify as Christian. Their sound is a hybrid of crunk, Baltimore club music, and electro, and they have garnered comparisons to punk for their defiance of labels and creation of new sounds.

Rappers Shunda K and Shon B started out as a duo named Yeah Majesty before they were rounded out circa 2001 by gospel-raised vocalist Jwl B. They started collaborating with London-based electronica duo HardfeelingsUK (David Alexander and Richard Winstanley), who supplied Yo! Majesty with their electro-rap club beats, in 2002. After a hiatus during Shunda K's marriage, Yo! Majesty regrouped. Once they established a name for themselves on the underground club circuit, both in the US and the UK, Yo! Majesty self-released their first official release, the Yo EP, in 2006.

They "made a splash" at SXSW in 2007 and that year toured alongside CSS and Gossip. Yo! Majesty has also toured with Peaches and was featured in her parody video of the Black Eyed Peas' "My Humps" called "My Dumps". The group signed with Domino Records in 2007, and the label released an EP and full-length record by the band in 2008, which included a track produced by Basement Jaxx.

A documentary based on the band, Das Wassup, directed by Johannes Schaff, was released in 2017.

== Discography ==
=== Albums ===
Year	Album	Record label
2006	Yo EP	Out There
2008	Kryptonite Pussy EP	Domino
2008	Futuristically Speaking... Never Be Afraid	Domino
2020	Bumpin' Too Hard f/ Basement Jaxx Single	GMEQCA/Matriarch Records
2021	FLEX Maxi Single	GMEQCA/Matriarch Records
2021	Make Em' Regret EP	GMEQCA/Matriarch Records
2021	Return of The Matriarch Album	GMEQCA/Matriarch Records
2022	The Belgian Stallion FLEX Remix	GMEQCA/Matriarch Records

=== Appears on ===
Year	Song	Album	Record label
2008	"Pony Girl"	Dub Gabriel – Anarchy & Alchemy	Destroy All Concepts
2008	"Sweat Shop"	Stainless Style by Neon Neon	Lex
2011	"Flavor" featuring Yo Majesty	Carbon Copy by ★STAR GUiTAR	

=== Singles ===
- 2009: "Don't Let Go"
- 2021: "FLEX Maxi Single"
- 2022: "FLEX - The Belgian Stallion Remix"
