= Can'tneverdidnothin' =

Studio album by Nikka Costa
- Released: May 24, 2005
- Recorded: Stellasound
- Length: 45:53
- Label: Virgin
- Producer: Justin Stanley; Nikka Costa

Nikka Costa chronology
Everybody Got Their Something (2001)	Can'tneverdidnothin' (2005)	Pebble to a Pearl (2008)

Singles from Hurt No More
- 1. "I Don't Wanna Know" Released: February 17, 2004; 2. "I Don't Think We've Met" Released: 2005; 3. "Till I Get to You" Released: 2005

Professional ratings
Aggregate scores
Source	Rating
Metacritic	67/100
Review scores
Source	Rating
Allmusic	4/5 stars
Blender	3/5 stars
Entertainment Weekly	D
Slant Magazine	3/5 stars
Rolling Stone	3/5 stars
The Village Voice	(choice cut)

Can'tneverdidnothin' is the sixth studio album by Nikka Costa, released on May 24, 2005, by Virgin Records as her second and final album with the label. It received generally favorable reviews from critics but was a commercial disappointment, peaking at #157 on the Billboard 200.

== Track listing ==
=== 2005 retail release ===
#	Title	
1.	"Till I Get to You"; Writers: Nikka Costa, Justin Stanley, Craig Ross	3:17
2.	"Can'tneverdidnothin'"; Writers: Costa, Stanley	3:10
3.	"Fooled Ya Baby"; Writers: Costa, Stanley	4:33
4.	"I Gotta Know"; Writers: Costa, Stanley	4:46
5.	"Around the World"; Writers: Costa, Stanley	5:22
6.	"Swing It Around"; Writers: Costa, Stanley, Shawn Davis	3:15
7.	"Funkier Than a Mosquita's Tweeter"; Writers: Aillene Bullock	3:46
8.	"On & On"; Writers: Costa, Stanley, Ross	2:53
9.	"Happy in the Morning"; Writers: Costa, Stanley	3:33
10.	"Hey Love"; Writers: Costa, Stanley, R.J. Manning Jr.	4:02
11.	"Fatherless Child"; Writer: Costa	4:20
12.	"Sugar in My Bowl" (hidden track); Writer: Nina Simone	2:11

=== 2004 promotional release ===
#	Title	
1.	"I Don't Think We've Met"; Writers: Nikka Costa, Justin Stanley	3:43
2.	"Till I Get to You"; Writers: Costa, Stanley, Craig Ross	3:24
3.	"I Gotta Know"; Writers: Costa, Stanley	4:30
4.	"Around the World"; Writers: Costa, Stanley	5:43
5.	"Swing It Around"; Writers: Costa, Stanley, Shawn Davis	3:04
6.	"Happy in the Morning"; Writers: Costa, Stanley	3:37
7.	"Can'tneverdidnothin'"; Writers: Costa, Stanley	3:04
8.	"I'm Gonna Leave You"; Writers: Costa, Stanley	2:56
9.	"The Last Time"; Writers: Costa, Stanley	4:35
10.	"Hey Love"; Writers: Costa, Stanley, R.J. Manning Jr.	4:02
11.	"Fatherless Child"; Writers: Costa	4:22

Notes

- "Till I Get to You", "Can'tneverdidnothin'", "Swing It Around", "Happy in the Morning", "I Gotta Know", and "Hey Love" are some of the tracks that were remixed and reorganized for the retail release.

== Personnel ==
Credits for Can'tneverdidnothin' adapted from Allmusic

- ?uestlove – drums on ("Happy in the Morning")
- Charlie Bisharat – violin
- John Blackwell – drums ("Around the World")
- Printz Board – horn on ("Can'tneverdidnothin", "Funkier Than a Mosquita's Tweaker")
- Jon Brion – organ on ("I Gotta Know"), synthesizer on ("Happy in the Morning")
- Aillene Bullock – composer ("Funkier Than a Mosquita's Tweaker")
- David Campbell – string arrangements on ("I Gotta Know", "Around the World")
- Dave Chegwidden – bongos, conga on ("Fooled Ya Baby", "Funkier Than a Mosquita's Tweaker")
- Larry Corbett – cello
- Nikka Costa – audio production, composer, Fender Rhodes, keyboard, Korg synthesizer, piano, producer, tambourine, vocals
- Shawn Davis – composer, bass, guitar (bass)
- Joel Derouin – violin
- Bruce Dukov – violin
- Berj Garabedian – violin
- Brian Gardner – mastering
- Ranjit Grewal – photography
- Chris Holmes – engineer on ("I Gotta Know", "Around the World")
- Stan "Chance" Howard – Moog bass, Moog synthesizer, organ
- Lenny Kravitz – bass, drums, bass
- Abe Laboriel, Jr. – drums
- Felix Lau – assistant engineer
- Brian LeBarton – clavinet, organ
- Tim LeBlanc – engineer
- Joshua "Trumpet Solo" Lopez – guitar, guitar (electric), shaker
- Roger Joseph Manning, Jr. – clavinet
- Manny Marroquin – mixing
- Keith Megna – guitar, guitar (acoustic), guitar (electric), sitar
- Wendy Melvoin – guitar (electric)
- Adam Moseley – engineer, mixing
- Tim Izo Orindgreff – horn, horn arrangements on ("Can'tneverdidnothin", "Funkier Than a Mosquita's Tweaker")
- Len Peltier – art direction, design
- James Poyser – Moog synthesizer
- Satnam Ramgotra – drums, turntables
- Brian Reitzell – drums
- Steven Rhodes – engineer
- Craig Ross – composer, guitar, guitar (acoustic), guitar (electric)
- Jim Scott – mixing
- Sinisha – photography
- Justin Stanley – audio production, bass, engineer, fuzz bass, guitar, guitar (bass), guitar (electric), kalimba, Mellotron, mixing, organ, percussion, producer

== Charts ==
Weekly chart performance for Can'tneverdidnothin'
Chart (2005)	Peak position
Swiss Albums (Schweizer Hitparade)	75
US Billboard 200	157
US Top R&B/Hip-Hop Albums (Billboard)	95
