= Muse (John Legend album) =

Studio album by John Legend
- Released: October 23, 2026
- Recorded: January 2025
- Studio: Louis Vuitton headquarters (Paris)
- Length: 42:47
- Label: Republic
- Producer: Pharrell Williams

John Legend chronology
My Favorite Dream (2024)	Muse (2026)

Singles from Muse
- 1. "Daylight" Released: September 8, 2026; 2. "Fireflies" Released: September 25, 2026; 3. "Bodies on the Floor" Released: October 23, 2026

Muse is the eleventh studio album by American musician John Legend, released on October 23, 2026, via Republic Records. It was written and recorded with producer Pharrell Williams at his studio at the headquarters of Louis Vuitton in Paris in January 2025. Named after the Muses from Greek mythology, the album cites musicians Nina Simone, Marvin Gaye, and Nat King Cole as influences. Lead single "Daylight" was released on September 8, 2026.

The album came about after Legend featured on Clipse's "The Birds Don't Sing" from Let God Sort Em Out (2025), produced by Williams. Legend described the album's aesthetic as "Black James Bond", with inspiration from Afrobeats, hip-hop, gospel, doo-wop, and soul music. "Fireflies" was released as the second single on September 25, 2026, alongside a music video directed by Paul Hunter. "Bodies on the Floor" was released as a single on the same day as the album.

== Background ==
Legend and Williams first met through Kanye West and have collaborated a few times, including on "It's Over", from Legend's Evolver (2008) and "Aim High" from Love in the Future (2013). Clipse's album Let God Sort Em Out (2025), entirely produced by Williams, features Legend on the track "The Birds Don't Sing". Several months later, Williams called Legend from Paris to ask about his next album and an opportunity to work together again. He sent Legend "Daylight", a song written with Samm Henshaw, which Legend recorded at home in December 2024. Most of the album was recorded in Williams's studio at the Louis Vuitton headquarters in the 8th arrondissement of Paris, with Legend making visits to the city, as well as sessions via Zoom.

== Critical reception ==
Professional ratings
Review scores
Source	Rating
AllMusic	3/5 stars
Beats Per Minute	72%

Andy Kellman of AllMusic gave Muse 3 out of 5 stars, saying that the album overall "comes off as more a creative exercise... than an essential part of Legend's catalog". He praised Legend's Sprechgesang technique in "Firefles" and "Her" but criticized Williams's "overstuffed" instrumentation as taking away from the vocals.

== Track listing ==
Muse track listing
No.	Title	Writer(s)	Length
1.	"Muse" (featuring Pharrell Williams)	John Stephens; Pharrell Williams	2:43
2.	"Pray for Ya"	Stephens; Williams; Kawan "KP" Prather; Samm Henshaw	3:18
3.	"Her Introduction"	Matt Jones	0:19
4.	"Her" (featuring Pharrell Williams)	Stephens; Williams; Prather; Henshaw	2:44
5.	"Daylight"	Stephens; Williams; Henshaw; Wayne Hector	3:17
6.	"Get Back" (featuring Pharrell Williams)	Stephens; Williams; Prather	3:35
7.	"Are You Ok?" (featuring Pharrell Williams)	Stephens; Williams; Prather; Sweata	2:38
8.	"Under the Bridge Introduction"	Jones; Williams	0:29
9.	"Under the Bridge"	Stephens; Williams; Prather; Sweata	3:00
10.	"Next Time" (featuring Pharrell Williams)	Stephens; Williams; Henshaw	3:27
11.	"Bodies on the Floor – Taps Intro"	Public domain	0:18
12.	"Bodies on the Floor" (featuring Clipse)	Stephens; Williams; Terrence Thornton; Gene Thornton; Henshaw	3:48
13.	"Doing Me"	Stephens; Williams	3:15
14.	"Fireflies" (featuring Pharrell Williams)	Williams	3:02
15.	"Everything"	Stephens; Williams	3:23
16.	"Sail Off"	Stephens; Williams; Henshaw	3:31

== Personnel ==
=== Production ===
- Pharrell Williams – production, mixing engineer
- Nicolas Beugnot – recording engineer
- Bryce Bordone – recording engineer, mixing engineer
- Jeff Chestek – recording engineer
- Thomas Cullison – assistant recording engineer
- Ananda Dhar-James – recording engineer
- Serban Ghenea – mixing engineer
- Larry Gold – conductor, recording arrangement, string arrangement
- Tom Gwaltney – assistant recording engineer
- John Hanes – immersive mixing engineer
- Matt Jones – conductor, recording arrangement, string arrangement
- John Krischer – assistant recording engineer
- John Legend – additional production
- Mike Larson – recording engineer, mixing engineer, programming
- Terrace Martin – recording arrangement, horn arrangement, background vocals
- Tim McClain – recording engineer
- Randy Merrill – mastering engineer
- Hal Ritson – programming
- Benjamin Thomas – recording engineer
- Matthew Ticconi – assistant recording engineer
- Steve Tirpak – recording arrangement, string arrangement
- Rob Ulsh – recording engineer

=== Instrumentation ===
- Kalie Fares Akel – viola
- Jéremie Billet – cello
- Arabella Bozic – viola
- Natasha Colkett – violin
- Gared Crawford – violin
- Blake Espy – viola, violin
- Glenn Fischbach – cello
- Clara Germont – cello
- Manon Gillardot – cello
- Léo Guiguen – cello
- Quintin 'Q' Gulledge – background vocals, acoustic guitar, electric guitar, Hammond B3, keyboard, organ, piano, Rhodes, synthesizer, tambourine
- Steven Heitlinger – viola
- Samm Henshaw – background vocals, acoustic guitar
- Natalie Imani – background vocals
- Danny Janklow – alto flute, alto saxophone, baritone saxophone, bass trombone, flute, tenor saxophone, trombone
- Jonathan Kim – viola
- Emma Kummrow – violin
- Yu-Hui Tamme Lee – violin
- Eugénie Le Faure – violin
- John Legend – lead vocals, background vocals, piano
- Sulivan Rachel Loiseau – bass
- Terrace Martin – background vocals, alto saxophone, bariton saxophone, tenor saxophone
- Matt Jones Orchestra – ensemble
- Luigi Mazzocchi – violin
- Mariam Mnatsakanyan – violin
- Aurore Moutome – violin
- Yoshihiko Nakano – viola
- Brent Paschke – electric guitar
- Brandyn Philips – bass trumpet, flugelhorn, trumpet
- Valentine Pierre – violin
- Emilie Planche – violin
- Kawan Prather – background vocals
- Florestan Raes – violin
- Usher Raymond IV – background vocals
- Hal Ritson – background vocals
- Marielle De Rocca Serra – violin
- Arthur Simonini – violin
- Devon Taylor – bass trombone, sousaphone, trombone, tuba
- Nina Tonji – viola
- Scott Tixier – violin
- Hugo Van Rechem – violin
- Tess Varley – violin
- Voices of Fire – choir
  - Alrenzo Albritton – chorus member
  - Kamron Blue – chorus member
  - Megan Buhmann – chorus member
  - Jazmine Canales – chorus member
  - Jordan Felisbret – chorus member
  - Larry George – chorusmaster, chorus member
  - T. Alexandria Gray – chorus member
  - Lauren Hendrick – chorus member
  - Trenise Holloman – chorus member
  - Jahzeel Mumford – chorus member
  - Maria Rosado – chorus member
  - Yunassea Thomas – chorus member
  - Colette Williams – chorus member
  - Bishop Ezekiel Williams – chorus member
- Pharrell Williams – background vocals
- Jessyca Wilson – background vocals

== Charts ==
Chart performance for Muse
Chart (2026)	Peak position
Japanese Digital Albums (Oricon)	85
Japanese Download Albums (Billboard Japan)	87
UK Album Downloads (Official Charts)	44
UK R&B Albums (Official Charts)	8
US Billboard 200	36
US Top R&B/Hip-Hop Albums (Billboard)	11

== See also ==
- Pharrell Williams production discography
