= Multiply (Jamie Lidell album) =

Studio album by Jamie Lidell
- Released: 13 June 2005
- Genre: Electronic; soul; funk; R&B
- Length: 39:17
- Label: Warp
- Producer: Jamie Lidell, Mocky

Jamie Lidell chronology
Muddlin Gear (2000)	Multiply (2005)	Multiply Additions (2006)

Multiply is a studio album by Jamie Lidell. It was released by Warp Records in 2005. Unusually for Warp, which for many years released mainly electronic music, the album has much in common with soul and funk music.

== Critical reception ==
Professional ratings
Aggregate scores
Source	Rating
Metacritic	84/100
Review scores
Source	Rating
AllMusic	2.5/5 stars
Entertainment Weekly	B+
Mojo	4/5 stars
NME	8/10
Pitchfork	8.5/10
Q	3/5 stars
Slant	4/5 stars
Spin	B
URB	4.5/5 stars
The Village Voice	A−

At Metacritic, which assigns a weighted average score out of 100 to reviews from mainstream critics, Multiply received an average score of 84% based on 24 reviews, indicating "universal acclaim".

Jonathan Keefe, writing for Slant, praised the album's mixture of classic soul and modern dance music while commenting on its departure from Warp's usual sound, saying "It’s hard to imagine what Warp’s post-IDM demographic might make of Multiply, but it’s an album fully deserving of finding a massive fanbase across multiple genres of more mainstream pop."

Mark Pytlik wrote a similarly positive review for Pitchfork, stating that "Multiply represents Lidell's dramatic transformation from a knob-twiddling laptopper to a red-blooded soul singer." Additionally, Pitchfork placed it at number 189 on its list of top 200 albums of the 2000s, calling it "a remarkable statement made by a remarkable artist."

== Track listing ==
No.	Title	Writer(s)	Length
1.	"You Got Me Up"	Jamie Lidell	1:48
2.	"Multiply"	Lidell, Dominic "Mocky" Salole	4:26
3.	"When I Come Back Around"	Lidell, Salole	5:27
4.	"A Little Bit More"	Jamie Lidell	3:06
5.	"What's the Use?"	Lidell, Salole	4:29
6.	"Music Will Not Last"	Jamie Lidell	3:29
7.	"New Me"	Jamie Lidell	4:07
8.	"The City"	Jamie Lidell	5:07
9.	"What Is It This Time?"	Lidell, Salole	3:05
10.	"Game for Fools"	Lidell, Salole	4:13

== Personnel ==
- Jamie Lidell – vocals, drums, keyboards, vibraphone, programming, production
- Mocky – bass guitar, guitar, piano, farfisa, synthesizer, tambourine, vocals, production
- Tony Buck – drums
- Daniel Raymond Gahn – drums
- Gonzales – piano
- Jordan McLean – horns
- Taylor Savvy – bass guitar
- Snax – synthesizer
- André Vida – horns
- Bill Youngman – guitar
