= Butterfly Rocket =

Studio album by Nikka Costa
- Released: August 1996
- Length: 51:22
- Label: Mushroom
- Producer: Justin Stanley

Nikka Costa chronology
Here I Am... Yes, It's Me (1989)	Butterfly Rocket (1996)	Everybody Got Their Something (2001)

Butterfly Rocket is Nikka Costa's fourth studio record and first "adult" album, released in August 1996 in Australia on Mushroom Records.

== Track listing ==
No.	Title	Lyrics	Length
1.	"Get Off My Sunshine"	Nikka Costa, Justin Stanley, J. Garner	4:11
2.	"Come Clean"	Nikka Costa, Justin Stanley	4:28
3.	"Flowers"	Nikka Costa, Justin Stanley	3:55
4.	"Master Blaster"	Nikka Costa, Justin Stanley	5:16
5.	"In This Life"	Nikka Costa	3:57
6.	"Treat Her Right"	Nikka Costa, Justin Stanley, R. Woolf	5:05
7.	"Meltdown"	Nikka Costa, Justin Stanley, M. Ward	5:14
8.	"I Do Believe"	Nikka Costa, Justin Stanley	4:19
9.	"Black Seed"	Nikka Costa	3:44
10.	"Grab Hold"	Nikka Costa	4:24
11.	"Who's Loving You?"	Nikka Costa	4:27

Later copies of the album were released with the limited edition bonus CD "Live at the Bridge". The songs were recorded live at The Bridge Hotel in November, 1996.

No.	Title	Lyrics	Length
1.	"Some Love"	Nikka Costa, Justin Stanley, J. Garner	5:08
2.	"Come Clean"	Nikka Costa, Justin Stanley	6:44
3.	"Get Off My Sunshine"	Nikka Costa, Justin Stanley, J. Garner	4:31
4.	"When My Man Cries"	Nikka Costa	5:07
5.	"Stay With Me"	Ron Wood, Rod Stewart	4:56
6.	"Yer Blues"	John Lennon, Paul McCartney	4:13

== Charts ==
Chart (1996)	Peak position
Australian Albums (ARIA)	103
