= Brian LeBarton =

American musician

Brian Lebarton
- Origin: Los Angeles, California
- Genres: Alternative rock, electronic
- Occupations: Musician, producer
- Instruments: Keyboards, drums, bass
- Label: None

Brian LeBarton is a musician from Los Angeles, California.

LeBarton gained some minor recognition in the 2000s by working for better known artists, including his worked on Beck's Grammy-nominated 2007 self-released single "Timebomb", the score to Nacho Libre.

Played drums and bass on Beck's cover of Bob Dylan's "Leopard-Skin Pill-Box Hat" for the War Child: Heroes charity album, and was an early member of the Record Club, a project launched for Beck's website in 2010 featuring contributions from Nigel Godrich, MGMT, St. Vincent, The Liars, Thurston Moore and Wilco.

== Work ==
Jamie Lidell : JIM, Intern on "Compass" and "Jamie Lidell" for Warp Records

Featured musician for the film Scott Pilgrim Vs. The World. Credited as "Sex Bob-Omb". His recording "Threshold 8-bit", was used in the end credits, sequenced entirely on a Commodore 64 computer.

Feist's album Metals.

co-wrote "Fire In The Water" by Feist for The Twilight Saga: Breaking Dawn – Part 2 film and soundtrack.

engineer on "Manhattan" and "Always On My Own" from the Cat Power album, Sun. Additional engineering on her follow-up album WANDERER

Guest vocal for the track "Streaker" by Tobacco, for his album Ultima II Massage.
