= Pro Whoa =

PRO★WHOA

EP by Nikka Costa
- Released: June 21 2011 (US)
- Genre: Pop; electropop; pop rock; dance-pop
- Label: Go Funk Yourself Records

Nikka Costa chronology
Pebble to a Pearl (2008)	PRO★WHOA (2011)

PRO★WHOA is a six-track EP by the American soul singer-songwriter Nikka Costa released on 21 June 2011. It marks a change in musical direction, from funk and soul toward a more pop-oriented aesthetic. It was the first release on Costa's own Go Funk Yourself Records. Reviewers noted the EP's mix of diverse influences into a pop sound, and called the songs "adventurous" and "freewheeling". A promotional version of the album was released with instrumental versions of the tracks and additional tracks that had been left off of Costa's previous album.

== Track listing ==
No.	Title	Length
1.	"Head First"	5:23
2.	"Never Wanna C U Again"	3:59
3.	"Nylons In a Rip"	4:20
4.	"Pro*Whoa!"	3:49
5.	"Stuff"	4:03
6.	"Chase the Thrill"	5:37
Total length:		27:11

Promotional version
Several tracks recorded after the release of Costa's previous album Pebble to a Pearl (2008) did not make the final EP, although "Not the Only One", "Everybody Loves You When You're Dead", "Ching Ching Ching", "Song for Stadiums", and "Radio" were included on an earlier promotional version of Pro Whoa (from which "Chase the Thrill" was omitted). "Ching Ching Ching" was released as a single in Europe and entered the German Charts at #77, making it Costa's first single to chart in that country since "On My Own" in 1981. "Not the Only One" was also released as a single. "Kick" appeared on the INXS tribute album Original Sin.

Disc One:

No.	Title	Length
1.	"Pro*Whoa!"	3:40
2.	"Never Wanna C U Again"	3:56
3.	"Not the Only One"	5:01
4.	"Head First"	5:26
5.	"Nylons In A Rip"	4:20
6.	"Everybody Loves You When You're Dead"	4:42
7.	"Ching Ching Ching"	3:33
8.	"Stuff"	4:02
9.	"Song for Stadiums"	4:40
10.	"Joshua"	3:57
11.	"Chase the Thrill"	5:51
12.	"Maybe Baby"	4:07
13.	"Radio"	5:01
14.	"I Got You"	2:23
15.	"Live B4 We Die"	3:17

Disc Two:

No.	Title	Length
1.	"Pro*Whoa! (Instrumental)"	3:34
2.	"Never Wanna C U Again (Instrumental)"	4:08
3.	"Not the Only One (Instrumental)"	4:03
4.	"Head First (Instrumental)"	5:25
5.	"Nylons in a Rip (Instrumental)"	4:27
6.	"Everybody Loves You When You're Dead (Instrumental)"	4:47
7.	"Ching Ching Ching (Instrumental)"	3:47
8.	"Stuff (Instrumental)"	4:03
9.	"Song for Stadiums"	5:24
10.	"Joshua (Instrumental)"	3:57
11.	"Chase The Thrill (Instrumental)"	5:40
12.	"Maybe Baby (Instrumental)"	3:32
13.	"Radio (Instrumental)"	5:13
14.	"I Got You (Instrumental)"	2:21
