= Nikka Costa (album) =

Studio album by Nikka Costa
- Released: 1981
- Recorded: 1981
- Genre: Pop
- Length: 35:29
- Labels: CGD (Italy); Columbia-CBS
- Producers: Don Costa; Tony Renis; Danny B. Besquet

Nikka Costa chronology
| Nikka Costa (1981) | Fairy Tales (1983) |

Nikka Costa is the debut studio album by Nikka Costa. It was released in 1981 by CGD Records in Italy in conjunction with CBS Records when Costa was nine years old, fifteen years before her first album for older audiences was released, and twenty years before her breakthrough album Everybody Got Their Something.

== Background ==
Costa's cover of "(Out Here) on My Own", originally from the musical film Fame, was released as a single from the album. The single topped the charts in Italy and Europe. The single's success prompted suspicions that Costa would be a one-hit wonder, and that her success would be short-lived, but neither of these predictions came true. Instead, by September 1982, the album had sold over 200,000 copies in Italy alone, and about 1.5 million copies worldwide.

== Track listing ==
Side one
| No. | Title | Writer(s) | Length |
|---|---|---|---|
| 1. | "Someone to Watch Over Me" (from Oh, Kay!) | Ira and George Gershwin | 2:53 |
| 2. | "I Believe in Love" | Danny B. Besquet; Ronald Jackson | 2:56 |
| 3. | "(Out Here) on My Own" (from Fame) | Lesley and Michael Gore | 3:31 |
| 4. | "Grown Up World" | Terry Ray, Nikka and Don Costa; Santo Farina | 2:33 |
| 5. | "Through the Eyes of Love" (from Ice Castles) | Marvin Hamlisch; Carole Bayer Sager | 3:57 |
| 6. | "Go Away, Little Boy" | Gerry Goffin; Carole King | 2:45 |

Side two
| No. | Title | Writer(s) | Length |
|---|---|---|---|
| 1. | "It's Your Dream" | Peter Sinfield; Teddy Randazzo | 3:27 |
| 2. | "Maybe" (from Annie) | Martin Charnin; Charles Strouse | 2:53 |
| 3. | "Bubble Full of Rainbows" | Marva Jan Marrow; Tony Renis | 3:09 |
| 4. | "Chained to the Blues" | Terry Ray Costa; Santo Farina | 2:21 |
| 5. | "You" | Paul Anka; Sammy Cahn | 3:17 |
| 6. | "So Glad I Have You" | Terry Ray and Nikka Costa; Santo Farina | 3:47 |

== Personnel ==
- Nikka Costa – lead vocals
- Don Costa – arranger/conductor
- Gaetano Leandro – synthesizer
- Victor Bach – Keyboards, piano
- Ernesto Massimo Verardi – guitar
- Ivo Meletti – guitar
- Julius Farmer – bass
- Carlo Russo – guitar
- Gigi Cappellotto – bass
- Tullio De Piscopo – drums, percussion
- Sergio Farina – guitar
- Giorgio Cocilovo – guitar
- Ronnie Jackson – guitar
- Giorgio Baiocco – tenor saxophone
- Françoise Goddard, Ornella Cherubini, Eloisa Francia, Silvia Annicchiarico, Naimy Hackett, Lella Esposito – backing vocals

== Certifications and sales ==
Certifications and sales for Nikka Costa
| Region | Certification | Certified units/sales |
|---|---|---|
| Brazil (Pro-Música Brasil) | Gold | 120,000 |
| France | — | 200,000 |
| Italy | — | 500,000 |
| Spain (Promusicae) | Platinum | 100,000^{^} |
Summaries
| Worldwide | — | 1,500,000 |
^{^} Shipments figures based on certification alone.
