= Pebble to a Pearl =

Studio album by Nikka Costa
- Released: October 14, 2008
- Genre: Soul; funk; jazz
- Label: Go Funk Yourself; Stax
- Producer: Justin Stanley, Nikka Costa

Nikka Costa chronology
Can'tneverdidnothin' (2005)	Pebble to a Pearl (2008)	Pro Whoa (2011)

Professional ratings
Review scores
Source	Rating
Allmusic	4/5 stars
Entertainment Weekly	B
PopMatters	7/10 stars
Slant Magazine	3.5/5 stars
Spin	3.5/5 stars

Pebble to a Pearl is the seventh studio album by American funk/soul singer Nikka Costa. Produced by Costa's husband Justin Stanley, who also worked with Jamie Lidell and Beck, it was released independently on the couple's label Go Funk Yourself Records, and distributed by the then recently re-activated Stax Records.

== Track listing ==
#	Title	
1.	"Stuck To You"; Writers: Nikka Costa, Justin Stanley	3:43
2.	"Can't Please Everybody"; Writers: Costa, Stanley, S. Balbi, P. Searels	5:05
3.	"Pebble to a Pearl"; Writers: Costa, Stanley, K. Ciancia	4:30
4.	"Someone for everyone" Writers: Costa, Stanley	3:47
5.	"Cry Baby"; Writers: Costa, L. Dozier, J. Poyser	5:08
6.	"Keep Wanting More"; Writers: Costa, Stanley, J. Falkner	4:48
7.	"Keep Pushin'"; Writers: Costa, Stanley	3:46
8.	"Love To Love You Less"; Writers: Costa	4:26
9.	"Without Love"; Writers: Costa, Stanley, "Mocky" Salole	4:24
10.	"Damn I Said It First"; Writers: Costa, Stanley	6:52
11.	"Loving You"; Writers: Johnny "Guitar" Watson	5:27
12.	"Bullets In The Sky"; Writers: Costa, Stanley	4:37

=== European bonus tracks ===
- 13. "The Denial Twist"

=== LP edition bonus tracks ===
- 13. "Stuck To You" (Instrumental)
- 14. "Pebble to a Pearl" (Instrumental)
- 15. " !@#$%^&*, I said it first" (Instrumental)

== Singles ==
- "Maybe Baby"
- "Stuck to You" - the first single from the album available as digital download
- "Pebble to a Pearl" - promo only

== Production ==
- Producer: Justin Stanley
- Co-Producer: Nikka Costa
- Executive producer: Andre Recke
- Mixing: Russell Elevado
- Mastering: Dave Collins
- Design: Hans Hettich
- Cover art concept: Nikka Costa
