= Everybody Got Their Something =

Studio album by Nikka Costa
- Released: May 22, 2001
- Recorded: 2000
- Studios: Electric Lady in New York and King Sound, Music Grinder, Glow2 Studios in Los Angeles
- Genres: Soul; funk; rock
- Length: 50:11
- Label: Virgin
- Producers: Justin Stanley, Mark Ronson, Nikka Costa

Nikka Costa chronology
Butterfly Rocket (1996)	Everybody Got Their Something (2001)	Can'tneverdidnothin' (2005)

Singles from Everybody Got Their Something
- 1. "Like a Feather" Released: July 30, 2001

Professional ratings
Review scores
Source	Rating
AllMusic	4/5 stars
Rolling Stone	3/5 stars
Slant Magazine	3.5/5 stars

Everybody Got Their Something is the fifth album by American pop/soul singer Nikka Costa, released in 2001. Although she had released several albums internationally as a child, this was her first release in the United States, and was released on May 22, 2001, by Virgin Records. It peaked at number 120 on the Billboard 200 in June 2001. As of 2005, it has shifted 250,000 units in United States.

== Uses in media ==
- The title song "Everybody Got Their Something" was originally released as a single in 2000, and was featured in various media: in the pilots of the TV series Arrested Development and Drop Dead Diva; the movies Blue Crush, Coach Carter, The Ugly Truth, and All About Steve; and in episodes of the TV series Buffy the Vampire Slayer, Felicity, ER, and Nip/Tuck; and was used in promos for ABC Daytime. On the strength of the song, she then recorded and released the eponymous album the following year. Chase also used the song in a 2020 commercial. A cover version of the song was used in a 2024 JCPenney commercial.
- The first single, "Like a Feather", was Costa's biggest hit. The song samples "I Dig Love" by George Harrison. It was used in many of Tommy Hilfiger's advertising campaigns.
- The song "Push & Pull" was featured in the movie Blow, starring Johnny Depp, and the video was included on its DVD release. Prince covered "Push & Pull" on his direct-to-DVD concert Live at the Aladdin Las Vegas, with the help of Costa.
- The song "So Have I for You" (co-written by the Beastie Boys) was used in the 2002 Britney Spears film Crossroads.

== Track listing ==
Everybody Got Their Something track listing
No.	Title	Lyrics	Length
1.	"Like a Feather"	Nikka Costa, Justin Stanley, Mark Ronson	3:55
2.	"So Have I for You"	N. Costa, Stanley, Michael "Mike D" Diamond, Adam "Ad-Rock" Horovitz, Adam "MCA" Yauch, John King, Michael Simpson, Matt Dike	5:10
3.	"Tug of War"	N. Costa, Xavier Cugat	4:32
4.	"Everybody Got Their Something"	N. Costa, Stanley	4:20
5.	"Nothing"	N. Costa	4:13
6.	"Nikka What?"	N. Costa, Stanley, Ronson	0:25
7.	"Hope It Felt Good"	N. Costa, Mark Anthony Jones, Pino Palladino, Stanley, Ronson	3:52
8.	"Some Kind of Beautiful"	N. Costa, Stanley	3:05
9.	"Nikka Who?"	Terry Ray Costa	0:42
10.	"Just Because"	N. Costa	3:48
11.	"Push & Pull"	N. Costa, Stanley	5:27
12.	"Corners of My Mind"	N. Costa, Stanley, Ronson, Joe Zawinul, James Rein, Ester Marrow	5:50
13.	"I Don't Want to Be the Rain (Japanese Bonus Track)"	N. Costa	4:39

=== Leftover tracks ===
Several tracks were recorded for Everybody Got Their Something, but later excluded from the final release.

- "Heaven Sinner" appears as a b-side on the "Like a Feather" single and on some promotional copies of the album.
- Early promotional versions of the album featured the tracks "La La La", "Stranger's Way", "Comes Around, Goes Around" and "Rain". The track "Rain" is an extended version of "I Don't Want to Be the Rain", which is featured on the Japanese edition of the album. "Comes Around, Goes Around" has been occasionally performed live.
- A stripped-down, acoustic version of "Push & Pull" is featured on the soundtrack of the 2001 movie Blow.
- An extended version of "Everybody Got Their Something" is featured on the 2009 movie All About Steve.

== Singles ==
- "Like a Feather" (#53 UK)
- "Push & Pull" (Promo only)
- "Everybody Got Their Something" (Promo only)

== Personnel ==
Credits for Everybody Got Their Something adapted from Allmusic

- Questlove – drums
- Printz Board – keyboards, trumpet
- Pat Burkholder – assistant, assistant engineer
- David Campbell – string arrangements
- Larry Corbett – cello
- Nikka Costa – arranger, Celeste, Fender Rhodes, guitar (acoustic), piano, producer, vocal arrangement, vocals, Wurlitzer
- Richard Dodd – cello
- Russell Elevado – engineer, mixing
- Mark Anthony Jones – guitar
- Pete Magdaleno – assistant, assistant engineer
- Pino Palladino – bass
- Len Peltier – art direction, design, photography
- James Poyser – clavinet, Wurlitzer
- Billy Preston – clavinet
- Tony Rambo – assistant, assistant engineer
- Jeff Skelton – assistant, assistant engineer
- Luis Sanchez – photography
- Justin Stanley – bass, Chamberlin, clavinet, digital editing, drums, engineer, guitar, Mellotron, Mini Moog, producer, xylophone
- Dominique Trenier – executive producer
- Scott Wolfe – assistant, assistant engineer

== Charts ==
Chart performance for Everybody Got Their Something
Chart (2001)	Peak position
Australian Albums (ARIA)	97
Austrian Albums (Ö3 Austria)	49
Swiss Albums (Schweizer Hitparade)	41
UK Albums (OCC)	109
US Billboard 200	120
