= Snax =

American musician, songwriter, producer, and DJ

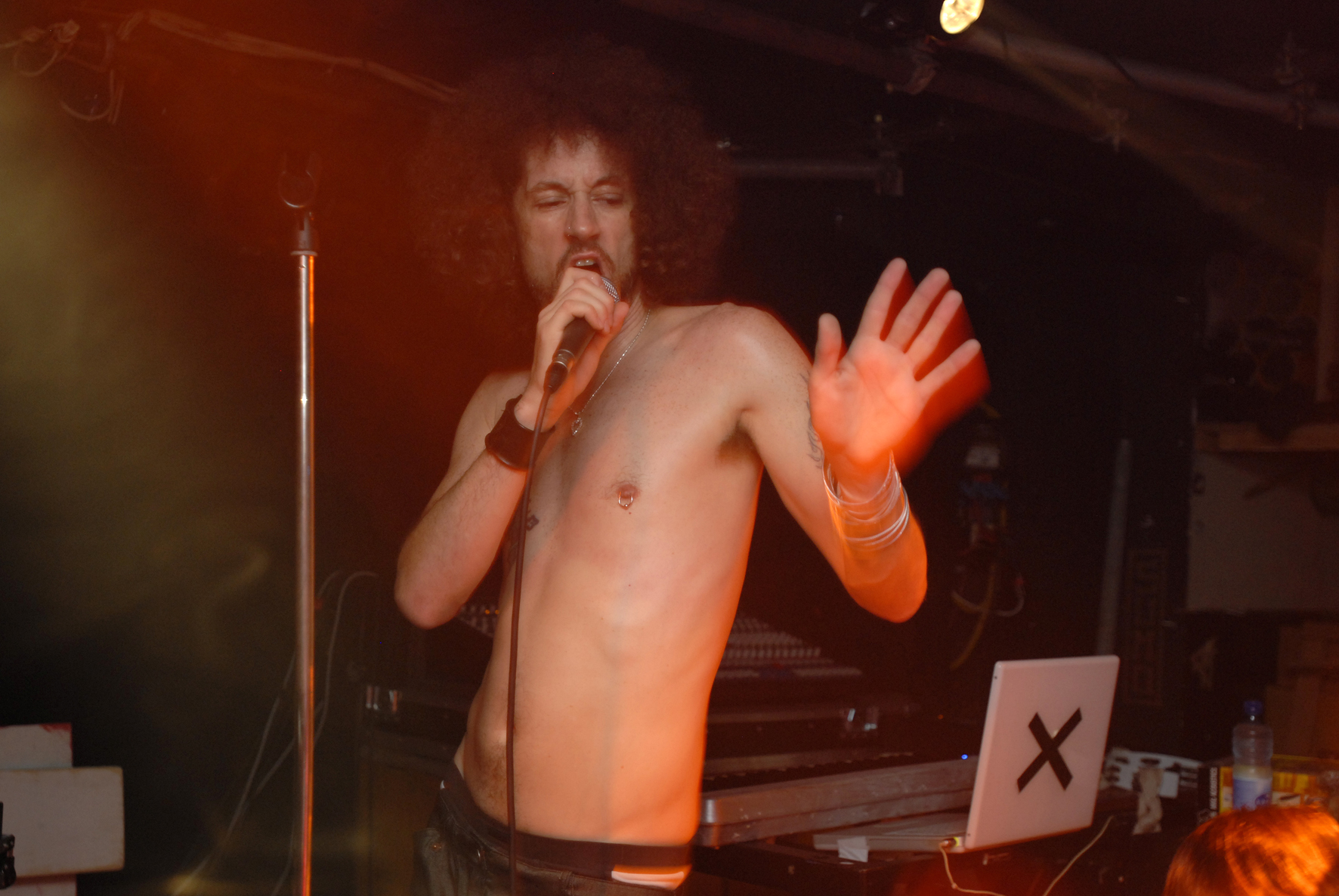
- Snax performing live in Delémont, Switzerland

Background information
- Also known as: Snax
- Born: Paul Bonomo; November 9, 1969 (age 56); Silverspring, Maryland
- Genres: Electronic, disco, soul, funk, house, experimental, pop, rock
- Occupations: Musician, producer, singer, DJ, entertainer
- Instruments: Keyboards, guitar, drums
- Years active: 2002–present
- Labels: Random Records, Mental Groove, TNT/Four Music, defDrive, Playhouse
- Website: snaxonline.org

Paul Bonomo (born November 9, 1969), better known as Snax, is an American musician, singer, songwriter, producer, performer and DJ from the Washington, D.C. area. He is currently based in Berlin, Germany.

Snax became well known as a member of electro-pop duo Captain Comatose and subsequently for his solo single "Honeymoon's Over", the remix of which by Konrad Black was an underground club hit in 2007. He has collaborated and toured with several artists including Peaches, Scissor Sisters, Mocky, Jamie Lidell and Joey Arias. Snax is proficient on keyboards and also plays guitar, bass and drums. He performs most instruments and vocals himself on his releases.

== Career ==
Snax founded the art-rock homopunk band Fagbash, who were active in Washington, D.C. and San Francisco. After moving to New York City, he was one half of the lo-fi hip hop act Bedroom Productions. Snax began collaborating with Khan and toured as keyboardist with Foetus. Together with Khan he formed the disco-pop band Captain Comatose, eventually releasing two albums, the first featuring the hit "$100".

In support of his first solo album From The Rocking Chair to the Stage, Snax embarked on a one-man-show tour of Europe in winter 2004. Subsequently, he collaborated with the likes of Kaos, Jamie Lidell, Mocky, Peaches and Soffy O.

Fall 2006 brought Snax's second album, Love Pollution. The Konrad Black tech-house remix for the single "Honeymoon's Over" became popular in 2007 In support of his second album Snax performed in the US with Jamie Lidell and as support act for Scissor Sisters through Europe.

In 2010 Snax released his third album Special Guest Star and in 2014 the EP Up and Coming Children. The year 2017 saw the release of Snax's fourth long player, Shady Lights. These were all released on his own label Random Records.

== Influences ==
Snax grew up on rock radio and discovered funk, disco and Go-Go in his teens. His music is influenced by artists such as Prince, Sly & the Family Stone, Parliament-Funkadelic, Iggy Pop as well as the genres of house music and lo-fi electronica.

== Discography ==
=== Albums ===
- 2004: From the Rocking Chair to the Stage (Mental Groove)
- 2006: Love Pollution (TNT/Four Music)
- 2010: Special Guest Star (Random)
- 2017: Shady Lights (Random)

=== EPs ===
- 2002: No Dancing (Freund)
- 2004: Pornosoundtracks (Freundinnen)
- 2008: Trouble (defDrive)
- 2009: Out of Trouble (defDrive)
- 2014: Up and Coming Children (Random)
- 2019: Loose Beats (Random Records)

=== Singles ===
- 2004: "No Dancing" (Mental Groove)
- 2005: "Hat Trick-US remixes" (Mental Groove)
- 2005: "Hat Trick-Swiss remixes" (Mental Groove)
- 2006: "It Ain't Love-Fill Me Up" as Snax and Ianeq (Get Physical)
- 2006: "Immer So" (TNT/Four Music)
- 2007: "Honeymoon's Over" (TNT/Four Music)
- 2011: "Special Guest Remix" (Random Records)
- 2017: "Turn It (feat. Mavin)" (Random Records)
- 2018: "Hands Dirty" (Random Records)

=== With Captain Comatose ===
- 2003: Going Out (Playhouse)
- 2005: Up in Flames (Playhouse)

=== As Tony Amherst ===
- 2008: "Rush" (Random Records)

=== As Box Office Poison ===
- 2016: "One Good Thing feat. Adam Joseph" (Random Records)

=== Collaborations ===
- 2006: Shapemod feat. Snax – Love's Too Much (Suicide)
- 2009: Nu Frequency feat. Snax – Passage of Time (Rebirth)
- 2010: Lorenz Rhode feat. Snax – Something Hot (Exploited)
- 2010: Maximillian Skiba feat. Snax – One to Pray To (Exploited)
- 2011: Shunda K feat. Snax – "It's Time to Get Paid" (The Most Wanted, Fanatic Recordings)
- 2011: Chaim feat. Snax – Wish (BPitch Control)
- 2012: Terranova feat. Snax – "Ain't No Thing" (Hotel Amour, Kompakt)
- 2012: Rimshooters vs. Snax – Pledge Allegiance (Her Majesty's Ship)
- 2013: Manhooker and Snax – Based on Misunderstandings 7 (Sonar Kollektiv)
- 2015: Hotel Motel feat. Snax – The Fall (LateNightTales)
- 2016: Guiddo feat. Jamie Lidell and Snax – Walked Out (LuvShack Records)

=== Other appearances ===
- 2011: "Take Care of Me" (Jerk Off, Zingy)
