= Jamie Lidell =

English musician

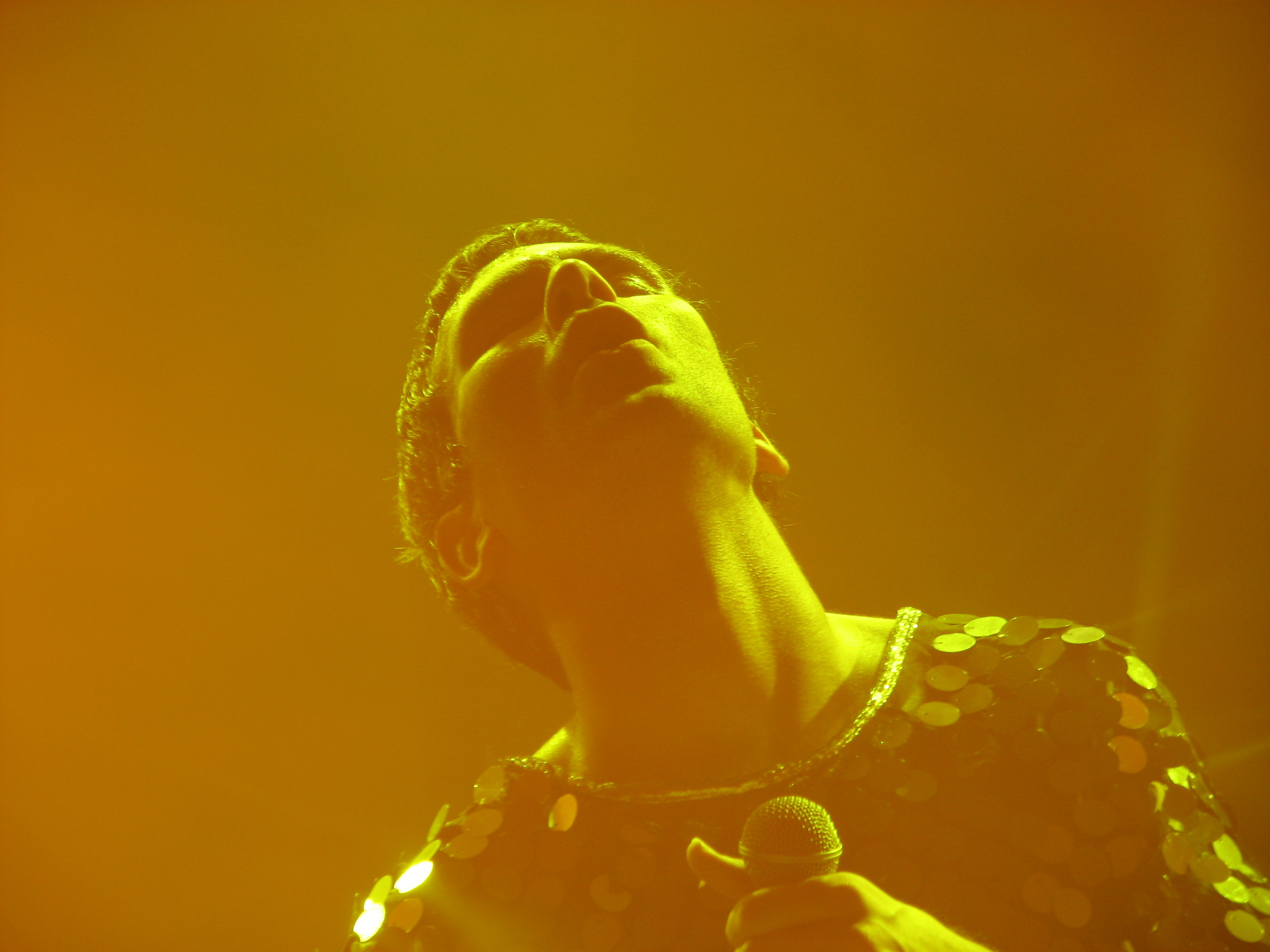
- Jamie Lidell performing in 2006

Background information
- Also known as: Jamie Lidell
- Born: James Alexander Lidderale; 18 September 1973 (age 53); Huntingdon, Cambridgeshire, England
- Genres: Soul; funk; electronic; experimental
- Occupation: Musician
- Label: Warp Records

James Alexander Lidderdale (born 18 September 1973), known professionally as Jamie Lidell, is an English musician, soul singer and podcast host. Lidell was formerly a part of Super Collider. He lives in Nashville, Tennessee, US.

== Career ==
Lidell is known for layering tracks made with his voice into a microphone and performing the percussion and melody as a sequenced, beatboxing one-man band. Following the release of his 2008 album, Jim, Lidell commented,

I want it to be about music, I think every musician does. But I think inevitably it ends up becoming about personality, which is what gives rise to the music, so people want to make sure that they get a bit of both. The more things do well, the more people want to know why it does well.

His song "Multiply" was used on the television show Grey's Anatomy, and was also included on its second soundtrack. Another song from his album Multiply, "A Little Bit More", was featured in a series of commercials for the U.S. retailer Target.

He often collaborates with Canadian musicians such as Gonzales, Feist and Mocky. In 2009 he collaborated with British electronic duo Simian Mobile Disco for the song "Off the Map". In 2006, he was part of a live performance collaboration with David Link and F. M. Einheit, which was released on CD as Echohce. In 2001, he provided vocals for the Lo Fidelity Allstars track "Deep Ellum...Hold On", from their CD Don't Be Afraid of Love.

In early 2009, Lidell's Jim won in the 8th Annual Independent Music Awards for Best Pop/Rock Album.

In 2009, he contributed a cover of Grizzly Bear's song "Little Brother" to the Warp20 (Recreated) compilation, as well as having his song "A Little Bit More" covered by Tim Exile.

In March 2010, Lidell announced that he was releasing a new album entitled Compass which was produced by fellow musician and occasional collaborator Beck. The album was released in May 2010. The title track is featured in the Rockstar video game Red Dead Redemption.

Lidell was the co-writer and vocalist for the Simian Mobile Disco track "Put Your Hands Together", from their 2012 album Unpatterns.

On 18 February 2013, Lidell released his self-titled album Jamie Lidell. It saw him return to his live one-man show set up. He was also featured in Atom™'s track "I Love U (Like I Love My Drum Machine)" featured on his album HD (released on 26 March 2013).

In February 2015, Lidell was featured on Big Data's song "Clean", also featured in Pro Evolution Soccer 2017 as soundtrack.

Jamie's seventh studio album Building a Beginning was released on 14 October 2016 featuring the lead single "Walk Right Back".

He is also the host of the podcast Hanging Out With Audiophiles, a show about recording techniques and the creative process, often featuring interviews with other musicians.

== Personal life ==
Lidell married his long-term girlfriend, Lindsey Rome, in the summer of 2012 in Nashville. Their son was born in November 2015.

== Discography ==
=== Albums ===
Year	Album	Peak positions						Certifications
Year	Album	BEL (Fl)	BEL (Wa)	FRA	NED	SWI	US	Certifications
2000	Muddlin Gear	—	—	—	—	—	—	
2005	Multiply	63	—	—	37	—	—	
2006	Multiply Additions	—	—	—	—	—	—	
2008	Jim	14	98	81	17	—	183	
2010	Compass	10	—	127	44	70	—	
2013	Jamie Lidell	13	129	—	64	66	—	
2016	Building a Beginning	68	176	—	97	—	—	

=== EPs ===
- Freekin the Frame (1997)
- 3 4 U (2020)
