= Nikka Costa =

American singer (born 1972)

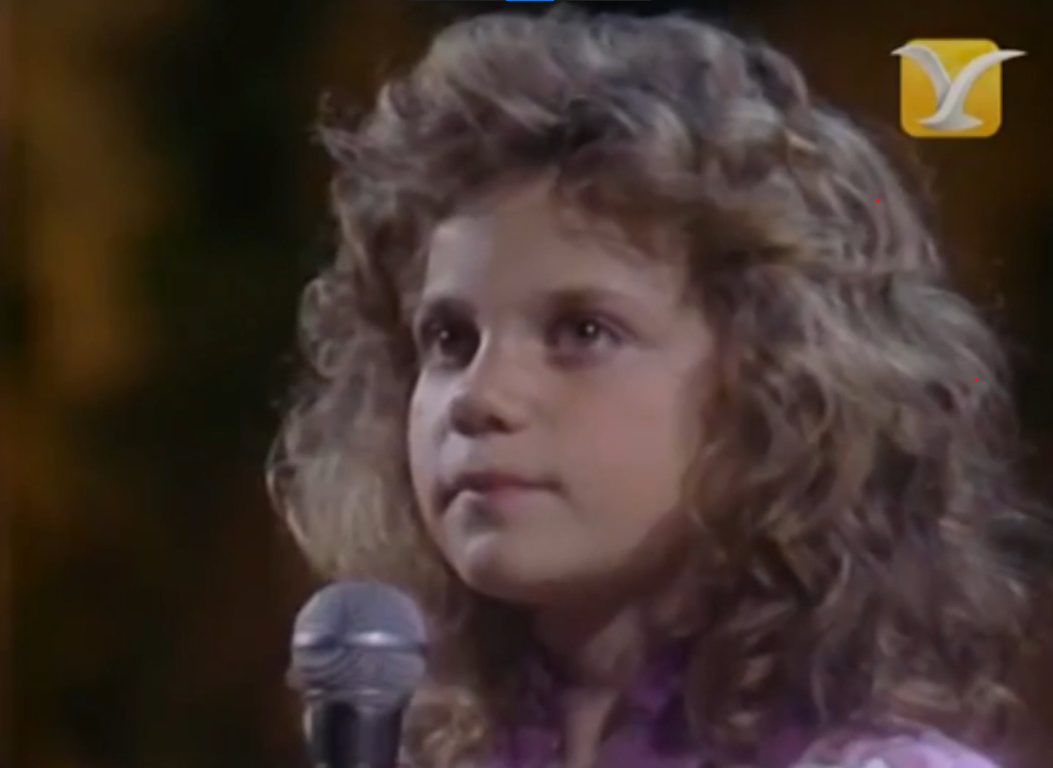
- Costa performing at the 1982 Viña del Mar International Song Festival

Background information
- Born: Domenica Costa; 4 June 1972 (age 54); Tokyo, Japan
- Genres: Pop; soul; blues; rock; jazz; funk
- Occupation: Singer-songwriter
- Instruments: Vocals; acoustic guitar; organ; keyboards
- Years active: 1981–present
- Labels: Mushroom; Stax; Virgin; Go Funk Yourself; Kartel Music Group
- Website: www.nikkacosta.com

Domenica "Nikka" Costa (born June 4, 1972) is an American singer whose music combines elements of pop, soul, and blues. She began her career as a child singer in the early 1980s. She is the daughter of music producer Don Costa.

== Early life ==
Nikka Costa was born in Tokyo, Japan to Italian-American parents. She was exposed to music from childhood, often surrounded by well-known artists as she traveled with her father, producer and musician Don Costa.

At age five, Nikka recorded a single with Hawaiian singer Don Ho. At age nine, she recorded an album with her father accompanying on guitar, and performed with Frank Sinatra on the White House lawn. Also at age nine, she recorded the song "(Out Here) on My Own" (from the movie Fame) with her father. The single reached No. 1 in Italy, No. 72 in Germany, No. 7 in Switzerland, No. 32 in the Netherlands, and No. 13 in the Flanders region of Belgium.,. The album Nikka Costa was released (outside of the U.S.) in 1981. Her second album, Fairy Tales (cuentos de hadas), was released in 1983. Don Costa died of a heart attack shortly after the album was recorded. The pop album Here I Am... Yes, It's Me (Loca Tentación) was released in 1989.

== Adult career ==
In the early 1990s Costa transitioned away from pop music to soul. She married Australian producer/songwriter Justin Stanley and moved to his home country; the couple eventually had a daughter named Sugar McQueen. While in Australia, Costa began writing songs and formed a "happy funk" band called Little Mona & the Shag Daddies, which broke up after four gigs in Sydney.

At age 22, Costa's next venture was a band called Sugarbone, which toured Australia in 1994; of the experience, Costa related that "It was really scary to unveil it, but the reaction was good. It helped my confidence." After touring with Sugarbone, she signed to the Mushroom Records label in Australia. In 1996, she released the album Butterfly Rocket in Australia, which earned her a nomination for the ARIA Music Award for "Breakthrough Artist" in that same year, and "Best Female Artist" the following year, in 1997.

In 2000, Costa's song "Like a Feather" was featured in a Tommy Hilfiger television advertising campaign. That exposure, coupled with the track's music video, helped her gain a foothold in the U.S. music industry. The album Everybody Got Their Something was released in 2001 and entered the charts at No. 120 on the Billboard 200. The title track and "Like a Feather" were radio hits, reaching no. 53 in the United Kingdom. In 2002, Costa was the opening act for Britney Spears' Dream Within a Dream Tour in the US and Canada. In 2005, Costa released the album can'tneverdidnothin'. She toured with Lenny Kravitz, who also performed on the record. In 2006, she and her husband Justin Stanley recorded and performed the theme to the short-lived CBS sitcom Courting Alex.

Costa was a guest singer on Mark Ronson. Her song "Push & Pull" (from the album Everybody Got Their Something) was included on the soundtrack of the 2001 movie Blow. The track "Everybody Got Their Something" was used in the soundtrack of the 2009 movie All About Steve. Her song "Stuck To You" (from the album Pebble to a Pearl) appeared in an episode of Grey's Anatomy (season five) and in The Peanuts Movie.

Costa signed with Stax Records in 2008. She released the studio album Pebble to a Pearl on 14 October 2008. In 2010, she released the single "Ching Ching Ching" in Europe, a notable genre change from soul/funk to electro-pop. The single reached No. 69 in Germany, making it Costa's first single to chart in Germany since "On My Own" in 1981. A new EP titled Pro Whoa was released in 2011. Costa co-wrote the song "Diamonds Made from Rain" on Eric Clapton's 2010 album Clapton. The album Nikka & Strings: Underneath and in Between, consisting of covers of rock standards, was released on 2 June 2017.

== Discography ==
- Nikka Costa (1981)
- Fairy Tales (1983)
- Here I Am... Yes, It's Me (1989)
- Butterfly Rocket (1996)
- Everybody Got Their Something (2001)
- Can'tneverdidnothin' (2005)
- Pebble to a Pearl (2008)
- Nikka & Strings, Underneath and in Between (2017)
- Dirty Disco (2024)

== Awards and nominations ==
=== ARIA Music Awards ===
The ARIA Music Awards is an annual awards ceremony held by the Australian Recording Industry Association.

Year	Nominee / work	Award	Result	Ref.
1996	"Master Blaster"	Breakthrough Artist - Single	Nominated	
1997	"Get Off My Sunshine"	Best Female Artist	Nominated	
