= List of songs recorded by Hadouken! =

Since their formation in 2006, British new rave/grime band Hadouken! have released three studio albums (Music for an Accelerated Culture, For the Masses, Every Weekend) alongside several singles, mixtapes, EPs, and remixes for other bands.

== Original songs ==
Song title	Album(s) / Single(s)	First released	Notes
"As One"	Every Weekend	2013	
"Bad Signal"	Every Weekend	2012	
"Bliss Out"	Every Weekend	2013	
"Bombshock"	For The Masses / House Is Falling	2010	
"Bounce"	Bounce / Not Here To Please You	2007	Originally released as a single in July 2007, it was re-recorded for its mixtape release in November.
"Crank It Up"	Music for an Accelerated Culture / Crank It Up	2008	
"The Comedown"	Every Weekend	2013	
"Dance Lessons"	Not Here To Please You	2007	
"Daylight" (Drumsound & Bassline Smith featuring Hadouken!)	Every Weekend / Wall of Sound	2013	
"Declaration of War"	Declaration of War / Music for an Accelerated Culture	2008	
"Driving Nowhere"	Music for an Accelerated Culture	2008	
"Evil"	For The Masses	2010	
"Game Over"	Music for an Accelerated Culture	2008	
"Get Smashed Gate Crash"	Get Smashed Gate Crash / Music for an Accelerated Culture	2008	
"Girls"	Not Here To Please You / Love, Sweat and Beer EP	2007	
"Hadoukestra"	none	2006	Unreleased demo taken from the band's old MySpace profile.
"House Is Falling"	For The Masses / House Is Falling	2010	
"Leap of Faith"	Not Here To Please You / Leap of Faith / Love, Sweat and Beer EP	2007	The full-length version of this song was never released. The only way to hear it was to listen via the band's MySpace profile.
"Levitate"	Every Weekend	2013	
"Liquid Lives"	Liquid Lives/Music for an Accelerated Culture	2007	It is currently the band's highest charting song, reaching #36 in the UK Singles Chart. The demo version is drastically different, featuring more prominent guitar, different lyrics, and an altered intro, bridge and outro.
"Lost"	For The Masses	2010	
"Love, Sweat and Beer"	Not Here To Please You / Love, Sweat and Beer EP	2007	
"M.A.D."	M.A.D. EP / For The Masses	2009	
"Mecha Love"	Mecha Love / Oxygen E.P. / Every Weekend	2010	
"Mic Check	For The Masses / Mic Check	2010	Three distinct versions of the song exist, the first being the album version. The single version is identical to the album version, but contains a sample from Double 99's "RipGroove". The Radio Edit is a heavier, 'dancier' remix of the single version.
"Mister Misfortune"	Music for an Accelerated Culture	2008	
"Oxygen"	Oxygen / Oxygen E.P. / Every Weekend	2010	
"Parasite"	Every Weekend	2012	
"Play The Night"	For The Masses	2010	
"Rebirth"	For The Masses	2010	
"Retaliate"	For The Masses	2010	iTunes bonus track.
"Something Very Bad"	M.A.D. EP	2009	
"Spend Your Life"	Music for an Accelerated Culture	2008	
"Spill Your Guts"	Every Weekend	2013	
"Stop Time"	Every Weekend	2013	
"Superstar"	none	2006	Unreleased demo taken from the band's old MySpace profile.
"That Boy That Girl"	That Boy That Girl / Liquid Lives EP / Mixtape / Music for an Accelerated Culture	2007	Released as the band's first single. The album version removes some unintelligible lyrics.
"Things Could Only Get Worse"	none	2010	Written as part of a Newsnight feature. Three bands were selected to write a song to be used as an "anthem" for one of the three political parties involved in the 2010 UK General Election. Hadouken! represented the Labour Party. The song was recorded after the release of For The Masses, so the release of the song is uncertain.
"Trap Door" (Feed Me featuring Hadouken!)	Feed Me's Escape from Electric Mountain	2012	
"Tuning In"	That Boy That Girl / Liquid Lives EP	2007	
"Turn The Lights Out"	Turn The Lights Out / For The Masses	2009	
"Ugly"	For The Masses	2010	
"The Vortex"	Every Weekend	2013	
"Wait For You"	Music for an Accelerated Culture	2008	
"What She Did"	Music for an Accelerated Culture	2008	
"You Can't Be That"	Liquid Lives / Not Here To Please You	2007	

== Remixed songs ==
Song title	Single/Mixtape/EP	Year released	Notes
"Crank It Up (Does It Offend You Remix)"	Crank It Up	2008	
"Crank It Up (Haunts Remix)"	Crank It Up	2008	
"Crank It Up (Noisia Remix)"	Crank It Up	2008	
"Crank It Up (The Clik Clik Remix)"	Crank It Up	2008	
"Declaration of War (Jeuce Rework)"	Declaration of War	2008	
"Declaration of War (Hadouken! Vs Kissy Sell Out Remix)"	Declaration of War	2008	
"Declaration of War (Mason Vocal Mix)"	Declaration of War	2008	
"Declaration of War (The Whip Remix)"	Declaration of War	2008	
"Get Smashed Gate Crash (David Wolf Remix)"	Get Smashed Gate Crash	2008	
"Get Smashed Gate Crash (Dezz Jones Vs D&G Remix)"	Get Smashed Gate Crash	2008	
"House Is Falling (Foamo Remix)"	House Is Falling	2010	
"Leap of Faith (Chase & Status Dub)"	Leap of Faith	2007	
"Leap of Faith (Chase & Status Vocal)"	Leap of Faith	2007	
"Leap of Faith (Shoes Remix)"	Leap of Faith	2007	
"Liquid Lives (Aaron La Crate Remix)"	Liquid Lives	2007	
"Liquid Lives (H! Re-Rub)"	Not Here To Please You	2007	Remix was created by the band themselves, and lasts less than a minute.
"Liquid Lives (Noisia Remix)"	Liquid Lives/Not Here To Please You/Love, Sweat and Beer EP	2007	
"Liquid Lives (Pirate Soundsystem's Headspin Remix)"	Liquid Lives	2007	
"M.A.D. (Detboi Remix)"	M.A.D. EP	2009	
"M.A.D. (Phace Remix)"	M.A.D. EP	2009	
"M.A.D. (Plastician Remix)"	M.A.D. EP	2009	
"Mic Check (Camo & Krooked Remix)"	Mic Check	2010	
"Mic Check (L.A.L.M. Edition)"	Mic Check	2010	
"Mic Check (Stupid Fresh Remix)"	Mic Check	2010	
"Tuning In (H! Re-Rub)"	That Boy That Girl/Liquid Lives EP/Mixtape/Not Here To Please You	2007	Remix was created by the band themselves, and appears on more releases than the original version of Tuning In. It omits the last verse.
"Turn The Lights Out (JFB Remix)"	Turn The Lights Out	2009	
"Turn The Lights Out (Spor Remix)"	Turn The Lights Out	2009	
"Ugly (Dub Mix)"	M.A.D. EP	2009	Mix created by the band themselves. It is simply the original song with the main vocal track removed. It was released on the M.A.D. EP before the original song was released on For The Masses.

== Cover songs ==
Song title	Original artist	Notes
"99 Problems"	Jay-Z	Played on BBC Radio 1's Live Lounge.
"Breathe	The Prodigy	Played live several times during 2008 and 2009. The only professionally recorded version is from Summer Sonic 2008.
"Song 2"	Blur	Played live several times during 2009, and on BBC Radio 1's Live Lounge.

== Remixed songs for other bands/artists ==
Song	Band	Release	Year	Notes
"The Prayer"	Bloc Party	The Prayer/Mixtape/Not Here To Please You	2007	
"Tree Friend Tree Foe"	Bolt Action Five	Not Here To Please You	2007	
"Dawn of the Dead	Does It Offend You, Yeah?	Dawn of the Dead	2008	
"Atlantis to Interzone"	Klaxons	Mixtape	2007	
"No More Eatin'"	Plan B	Mixtape/Not Here To Please You	2007	
"Get Sexy"	Sugababes	Get Sexy	2009	
"Warrior's Dance"	The Prodigy	none	2010	The remix can only be heard on 'Blogdouken 7', one of the band's vlogs. Even then, parts of it are obscured by conversation, so there is currently no way to hear the full, unobstructed remix.
"Frustration"	The Whip	Remix Marks Destination	2008	
