= Hadouken! discography =

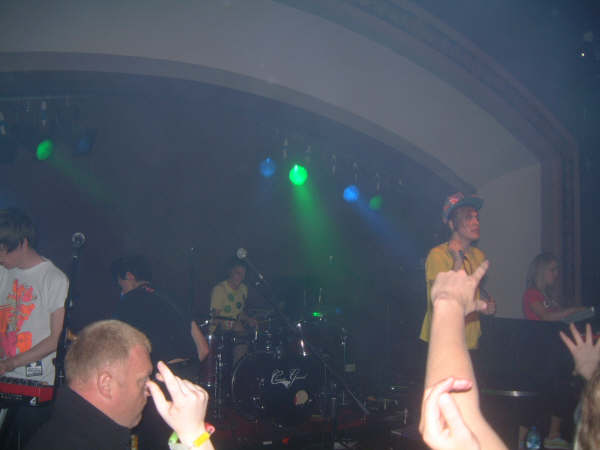
- l-r:Chris, Dan, Nick, James & Alice playing at the Classic Grand in Glasgow, Scotland
- Studio albums: 3
- Extended plays: 6
- Singles: 12
- Music videos: 22

The discography of Hadouken!, a Leeds-based grindie band, currently consists of three studio albums, six EPs, ten singles, and twenty two music videos.

== Studio albums ==
Title	Details	Peak chart positions			
Title	Details	UK	UK Dance	UK Indie	SCO
Music for an Accelerated Culture	Released: 24 April 2008; Label: Atlantic Records; Format: CD	12	—	—	20
For the Masses	Released: 25 January 2010; Label: Atlantic Records; Format: CD	19	—	—	33
Every Weekend	Released: 18 March 2013; Label: Independent; Format: CD/Laserdisc	35	5	6	50
"—" denotes album that did not chart or was not released

== Extended plays ==
Title	Details
Liquid Lives EP	Released: 25 June 2007; Label: Surface Noise/Atlantic; Format: CD, digital download
Mixtape	Released: 2007; Label: Surface Noise Records; Format: Digital download
Not Here to Please You	Released: 12 November 2007; Label: Atlantic Records; Format: USB memory stick, digital download
Love, Sweat and Beer EP	Released: 18 November 2007; Label: Atlantic Records; Format: Digital download
iTunes Live: London	Released: 2008; Label: Atlantic Records; Format: Digital download
M.A.D. EP	Released: 14 September 2009; Label: Surface Records/Warner Japan/Zoom; Format: CD, digital download
Oxygen EP	Released: 18 January 2011; Label: Surface Records; Format: Digital download

== Singles ==
=== As lead artist ===
Title	Year	Peak chart positions										Album
Title	Year	UK	UK Dance	UK Indie	CIS	CZR	CZR Rock	NLD Dance	SCO	US	US Dance	Album
"That Boy That Girl"	2007	188	5	10	—	—	—	—	—	—	—	Music for an Accelerated Culture
"Liquid Lives"	2007	36	—	—	—	—	8	—	26	—	—	Music for an Accelerated Culture
"Bounce"	2007	—	—	—	—	—	—	—	—	—	—	Not Here to Please You
"Leap of Faith"	2007	131	—	—	—	—	—	—	—	—	—	Not Here to Please You
"Love, Sweat and Beer"	2007	—	—	—	—	—	—	—	—	—	—	Not Here to Please You
"Get Smashed Gate Crash"	2008	—	—	—	—	—	—	—	—	—	—	Music for an Accelerated Culture
"Declaration of War"	2008	66	—	—	—	—	—	—	—	—	—	Music for an Accelerated Culture
"Crank It Up"	2008	—	—	—	—	—	—	—	—	—	—	Music for an Accelerated Culture
"M.A.D."	2009	—	—	—	—	—	—	—	—	—	—	For the Masses
"Turn the Lights Out"	2010	153	—	—	—	—	—	—	—	—	—	For the Masses
"Mic Check"	2010	85	8	—	189	—	—	—	86	—	—	For the Masses
"House Is Falling"	2010	—	—	—	—	—	—	—	—	—	—	For the Masses
"Mecha Love"	2010	130	20	—	—	—	—	—	—	—	—	Every Weekend
"Oxygen"	2010	—	27	—	—	—	—	—	—	—	—	Every Weekend
"Parasite"	2012	—	—	—	—	—	—	—	—	—	—	Every Weekend
"Bad Signal"	2012	—	38	20	—	—	—	—	—	—	—	Every Weekend
"Levitate"	2013	87	17	8	—	62	—	18	78	69	9	Every Weekend
"Midnight"	2014	—	—	—	—	—	—	—	—	—	—	Non-album single
"—" denotes releases that did not chart or were not released in that territory.

=== As featured artist ===
Title	Year	Album
"Daylight" (Drumsound & Bassline Smith featuring Hadouken!)	2012	Wall of Sound and Every Weekend
"Synchronize" (Tom Swoon & Paris Blohm featuring Hadouken!)	2013	Non-album single

== Music videos ==
Year	Album	Song	Director	Type	Link
2007	Music for an Accelerated Culture	That Boy That Girl	unknown	Performance	
2007	Music for an Accelerated Culture	Liquid Lives	unknown	Performance	
2007	Music for an Accelerated Culture	Get Smashed Gate Crash	unknown	Live footage	
2008	Music for an Accelerated Culture	Wait For You	unknown	Tour footage	
2009	For the Masses	M.A.D.	unknown	Narrative	
2009	For the Masses	Turn The Lights Out	unknown	Performance	
2010	For the Masses	Bombshock	unknown	Compilation (footage of babies dancing)	
2010	For the Masses	Bombshock	Rellik	Film footage (from anime:Flag)	
2010	For the Masses	Rebirth	unknown	Live footage	
2010	For the Masses	Mic Check	unknown	Performance	
2010	For the Masses	House Is Falling Down	unknown	Live footage	
2010	Every Weekend	Mecha Love	unknown	Compilation (film footage of unknown anime)	
2010	Every Weekend	Mecha Love	unknown	Compilation (people are awesome)	
2011	Every Weekend	Oxygen	unknown	Performance	
2011	Every Weekend	Palms in the Air	unknown	Static imagery	
2012	Every Weekend	Parasite	unknown	Narrative	
2012	Every Weekend	Bad Signal	unknown	Narrative	
2012	Every Weekend	Bad Signal	Dan Rice	Film footage	
2013	Every Weekend	Levitate	unknown	Revision (of film: Frozen Wave by Juan Rayos)	
2013	Every Weekend	Levitate	unknown	Compilation (people are awesome)	
2013	Every Weekend	As One	unknown	Live footage	
2013	Every Weekend	Stop Time	unknown	Tour footage	
