= List of dance-punk artists =

This is a list of notable dance-punk artists.

== 0–9 ==
- !!!
- 311

== A ==
- Aerodrone
- The Automatic
- ADULT.
- Arctic Monkeys
- Au Pairs

== B ==
- Bang! Bang! Eche!
- Bloc Party
- The Bloody Beetroots
- Bolt Action Five
- The Bravery
- Bush Tetras

== C ==
- Cassette Kids
- Clor
- controller.controller
- Crystal Castles
- Cut Copy
- CSS

== D ==
- DARTZ!
- Datarock
- Delta 5
- Death From Above 1979
- Digitalism
- Does It Offend You, Yeah?
- Duchess Says
- DZ Deathrays

== E ==
- Electric Six
- ESG
- Every Move a Picture

== F ==
- The Faint
- Fake Shark - Real Zombie!
- Foals
- Franz Ferdinand
- Funeral Party

== G ==
- Gang of Four
- Goose
- Guerilla Toss

== H ==
- Hadouken!
- Hockey
- Hot Hot Heat

== J ==
- James Chance and the Contortions
- Joy Division
- Justice

== K ==
- Klaxons
- Konk

== L ==
- LCD Soundsystem
- Le Tigre
- Le Castle Vania
- Liars
- Liquid Liquid
- Late of the Pier
- Ladyhawke

== M ==
- Matt and Kim
- Maths Class
- Math the Band
- Medium Medium
- Midnight Juggernauts
- Mindless Self Indulgence
- My Passion
- Moving Units
- McCafferty

== N ==
- New Young Pony Club
- Ninja High School
- No Doubt

== O ==
- The Oral Cigarettes

== P ==
- Peaches
- The Presets
- Professor Murder
- Pedicab
- The Pop Group
- Public Image Ltd

== Q ==
- Q and Not U

== R ==
- Radio 4
- The Rapture
- Republica

== S ==
- The Sessions
- Silent TV
- SHITDISCO
- Shout Out Out Out Out
- Shriekback

== T ==
- Talking Heads
- Test Icicles
- Thunderbirds Are Now!
- Ting Tings
- Taken by Cars
- Tom Tom Club
- The 1975

== U ==
- United State of Electronica

== V ==
- VCR
- VHS or Beta
- The Virgins
- Vitalic

== W ==
- Water From Your Eyes
- WhoMadeWho
- The Whip
- Welly

== Y ==
- Yeah Yeah Yeahs
- You Say Party
