= Get Smashed Gate Crash =

Single by Hadouken!

from the album Music for an Accelerated Culture
- Released: 17 March 2008
- Recorded: 2008
- Genre: Grindie
- Songwriter: James Smith

Hadouken! singles chronology
"Love, Sweat and Beer" (2007)	"Get Smashed Gate Crash" (2008)	"Declaration of War" (2008)

Music video
- "Get Smashed Gate Crash" on YouTube

Get Smashed Gate Crash is the first single from Hadouken!'s debut album Music for an Accelerated Culture, released on 4 May 2008. The physical single was available from 17 March 2008, with the digital version being released on 4 April 2008.

The song was Hadouken!'s standard set opener from 2008 until 2009, when it was replaced by the opening track to For the Masses, Rebirth.

== Track listing ==
=== 10" ===
A:"Get Smashed Gate Crash"
B:"Get Smashed Gate Crash (Dezz Jones Vs D&G Remix)"

=== Digital Download ===
1. "Get Smashed Gate Crash"
2. "Get Smashed Gate Crash (David Wolf Remix)"

== Release ==
Although the song was the first single to be specifically released from Music For An Accelerated Culture, it was not the earliest song to be included on it. Previous singles That Boy That Girl and Liquid Lives were also on the album.

== Music video ==
The music video for "Get Smashed Gate Crash" is based on a similar concept to Blink 182's "The Rock Show", where the band are given $500,000 in cash and go out and blow it all. Their video documents the band using two handheld DV camcorders, the band going to 4 pubs and a house party with 30 of their close friends, with money for drinks from the production company.
