= Mixtape (Hadouken! EP) =

Compilation album by Hadouken!
- Released: 2007
- Genre: Grindie
- Label: Surface Noise Records

Hadouken! chronology
Mixtape (2007)	Not Here to Please You (2007)

Mixtape is a collection of tracks merged by Leeds-based grindie band Hadouken! to create a mixtape. The tracks include Hadouken! remixes of other songs, and a demo version of the band's debut single, "That Boy That Girl". The mixtape was released as a free digital download following the band's previous single, "Liquid Lives".

== Track listing ==
1. Bloc Party - "The Prayer" (Hadouken! Remix)
2. Like Woah! - "Oh I Like (Woah!)"
3. David E Sugar feat. Ears - "First OK"
4. Wiley - "Eskiboy"
5. Plan B - "No More Eatin'" (Hadouken! Remix)
6. Virus Syndicate - "Red Eyes"
7. TNT - "Transmission"
8. Skepta feat. Wiley, JME & Creed - "Duppy"
9. Klaxons - "Atlantis to Interzone" (Hadouken! Remix)
10. Bolt Action Five - "Tree Friend Tree Foe" (Kissy Sell Out Remix)
11. Hadouken! - "Tuning In" (H! Re-Dub)
12. Uffie - "Ready to Uff"
13. Kate Nash - "Caroline Is a Victim"
14. Mr. Oizo - "Flat Beat"
15. Klaxons - "Golden Skans" (David E Sugar Remix)
16. Justice - "Phantom"
17. Fox N Wolf - "Youth Alcoholic"
18. Radioclit - "Mature Macho Machine" (Solid Groove and Sinden Remix)
19. The Gossip - "Standing in the Way of Control" (Soulwax Remix)
20. Test Icicles - "Catch It"
21. Jixilix? - "Go"
22. Hadouken! - "That Boy That Girl" (Demo)
