= Mic Check =

Mic Check is a phrase used by human microphones. It may also refer to:

- a soundcheck
- "Mic Check" (Hadouken! song), a song by Hadouken!
- "Mic Check" (Juelz Santana song), a song by Juelz Santana
- "Mic Check", a recording on the B-side of Imogen Heap's single "Headlock"
- "Mic Check", a song by the Italian rapper Noyz Narcos featuring Salmo
- "Mic Check", a song by Rage Against the Machine from the album The Battle of Los Angeles
