= Crank It Up =

Crank It Up may refer to:

- "Crank It Up" (David Guetta song), 2011
- "Crank It Up" (Hadouken! song), 2008
- "Crank It Up" (Ashley Tisdale song), 2009
- "Crank It Up", a song by David Banner
- "Crank It Up", a song by Joey Valence & Brae
- "Crank It Up", a song by Peter Brown
- "Crank It Up", a song on Scooter's album Our Happy Hardcore
