= List of UK Dance Singles Chart number ones of 2007 =

The UK Dance Singles Chart is a music chart compiled in the United Kingdom by the Official Charts Company (OCC) from sales of songs in the dance music genre (EDM, house, drum and bass, synthpop, dance-pop, etc.) in record stores and digital downloads.

These are the song which reached number one on the UK Dance Singles Chart in 2007. The dates listed in the menus below represent the Saturday after the Sunday the chart was announced, as per the way the dates are given in chart publications such as the ones produced by Billboard, Guinness, and Virgin.

== Chart history ==
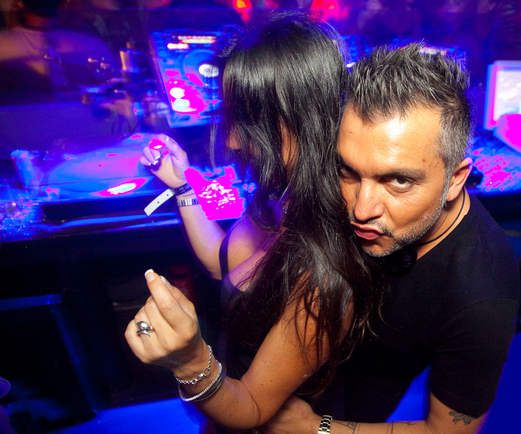
Italian DJ Alex Gaudino had one of the biggest-selling dance hits of 2007 with "Destination Calabria".

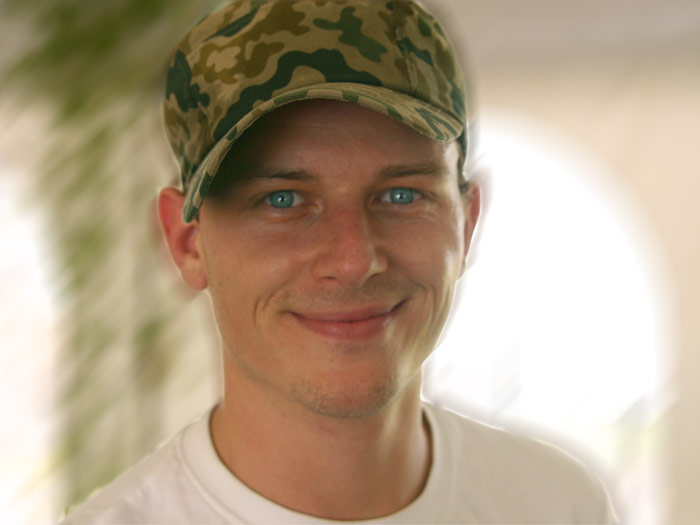
Fedde le Grand reached number one on the UK Dance Chart with three singles.

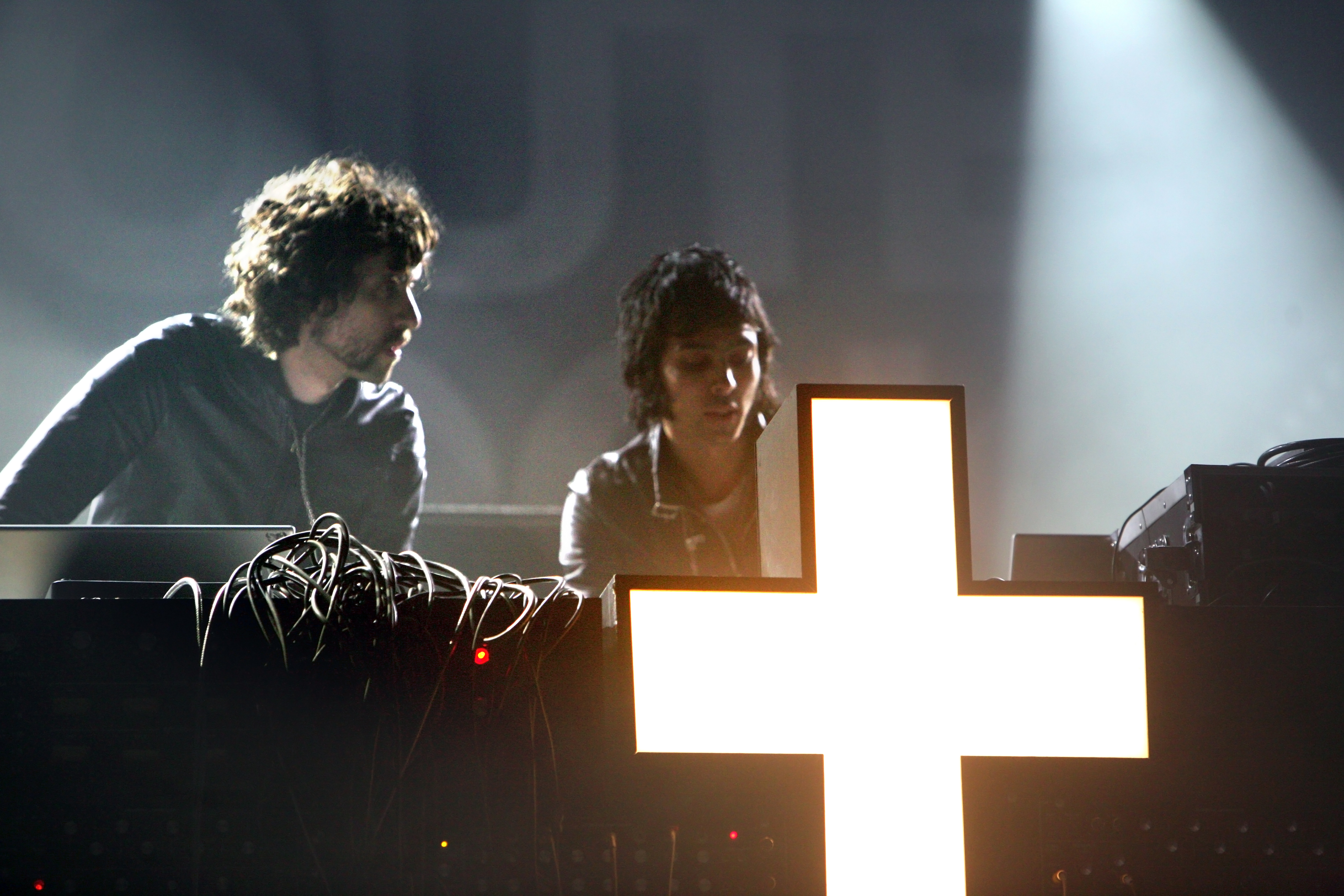
French band Justice topped the UK Dance Chart with "D.A.N.C.E.".

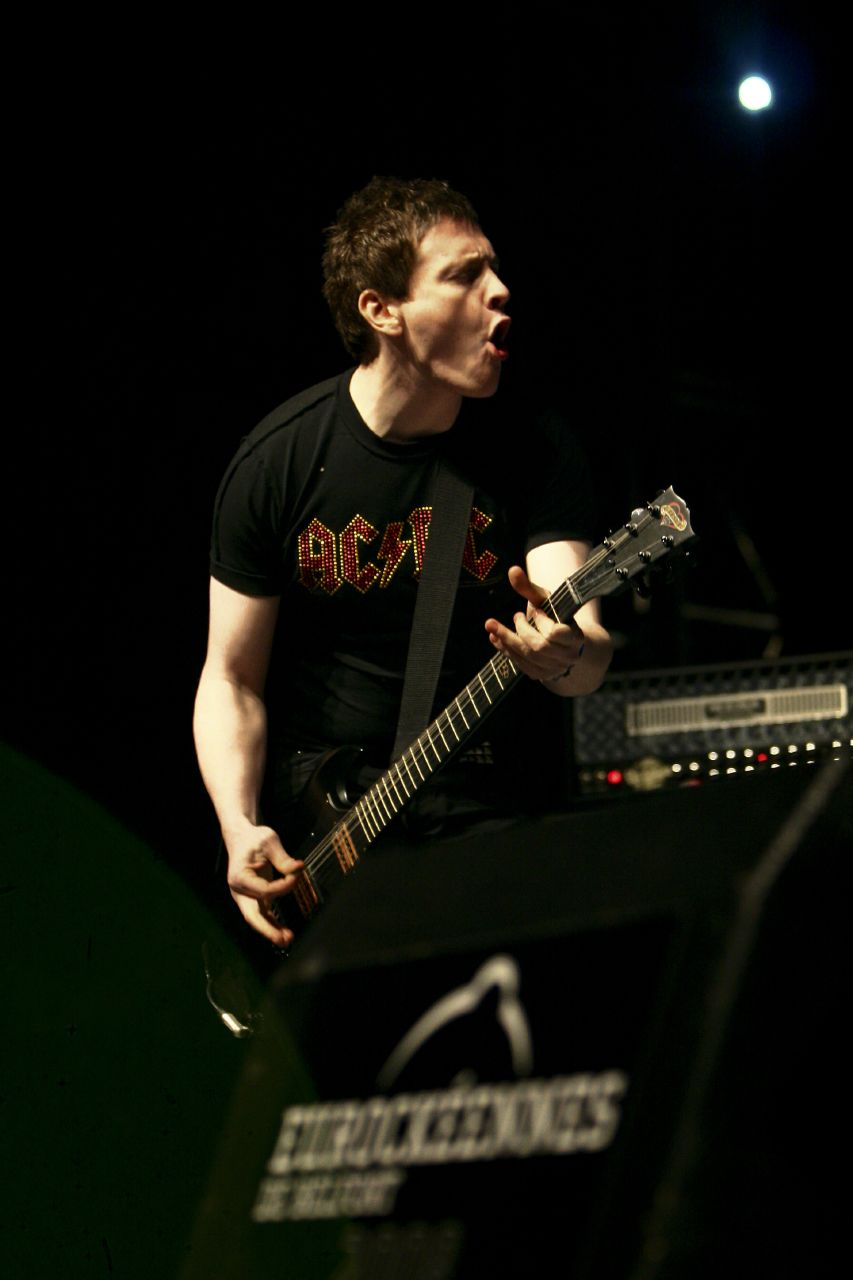
Calvin Harris reached the top of the UK Dance Chart with "The Girls".

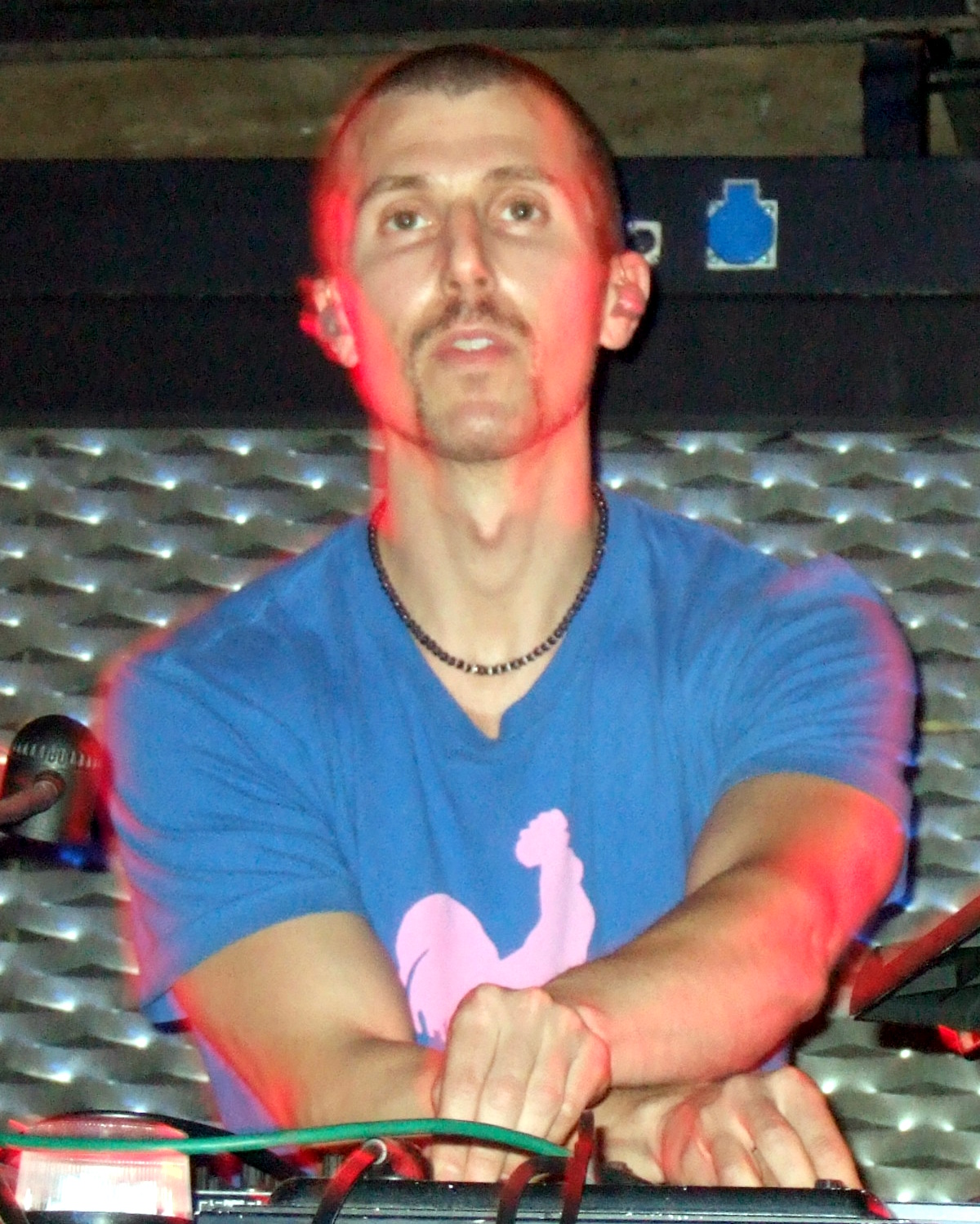
American DJ Wink topped the chart with his single "Higher State of Consciousness".

Issue date	Song	Artist(s)	Record label	Reference
6 January	"Put Your Hands Up for Detroit"	Fedde le Grand	CR2	
13 January	"Proper Education"	Eric Prydz vs. Floyd	Data/Positiva	
20 January	"Proper Education"	Eric Prydz vs. Floyd	Data/Positiva	
27 January	"Proper Education"	Eric Prydz vs. Floyd	Data/Positiva	
3 February	"Perfect (Exceeder)"	Mason vs. Princess Superstar	B.O.S.S./Data	
10 February	"Proper Education"	Eric Prydz vs. Floyd	Data/Positiva	
17 February	"Perfect (Exceeder)"	Mason vs. Princess Superstar	B.O.S.S./Data	
24 February	"Perfect (Exceeder)"	Mason vs. Princess Superstar	B.O.S.S./Data	
3 March	"Dare Me (Stupidisco)"	Junior Jack featuring Shena	Defected	
10 March	"Dare Me (Stupidisco)"	Junior Jack featuring Shena	Defected	
17 March	"The Creeps"	Camille Jones/Fedde le Grand	Data	
24 March	"The Creeps"	Camille Jones/Fedde le Grand	Data	
31 March	"Destination Calabria"	Alex Gaudino featuring Crystal Waters	Data	
7 April	"Last Night a DJ Saved My Life"	Seamus Haji featuring Kayjay	Apollo	
14 April	"Destination Calabria"	Alex Gaudino featuring Crystal Waters	Data	
21 April	"Stop Me"	Mark Ronson featuring Daniel Merriweather	Columbia	
28 April	"Destination Calabria"	Alex Gaudino featuring Crystal Waters	Data	
5 May	"Kinda New"	Spektrum	CR2	
12 May	"Get Down"	Groove Armada	Columbia	
19 May	"Get Down"	Groove Armada	Columbia	
26 May	"Get Down"	Groove Armada	Columbia	
2 June	"Sirens"	Dizzee Rascal	XL	
9 June	"Lowdown"	Xample	Ram	
16 June	"The Girls"	Calvin Harris	Columbia	
23 June	"D.A.N.C.E."	Justice	Because/Ed Banger	
30 June	"Do It Again"	The Chemical Brothers	Virgin	
7 July	"Do It Again"	The Chemical Brothers	Virgin	
14 July	"Do It Again"	The Chemical Brothers	Virgin	
21 July	"Beggin'" (Pilooski remix)	Frankie Valli/The Four Seasons	679	
28 July	"If We Ever"	High Contrast	Hospital	
4 August	"Song 4 Mutya"	Groove Armada	Columbia	
11 August	"Higher State of Consciousness"	Wink	Strictly Rhythm	
18 August	"Rise Up"	Yves Larock	Data	
25 August	"I Found U"	Axwell featuring Max'C	Positiva	
1 September	"Love Is Gone"	David Guetta featuring Chris Willis	Charisma	
8 September	"The Creeps (Get on the Dancefloor)"	Freaks	Data	
15 September	"I Want Your Soul"	Armand Van Helden	Southern Fried	
22 September	"The Salmon Dance"	The Chemical Brothers	Virgin	
29 September	"I Found U"	Axwell featuring Max'C	Positiva	
6 October	"Let Me Think About It"	Ida Corr vs. Fedde le Grand	Data	
13 October	"Let Me Think About It"	Ida Corr vs. Fedde le Grand	Data	
20 October	"Let Me Think About It"	Ida Corr vs. Fedde le Grand	Data	
27 October	"Hurt You" / "Sell Me Your Soul"	Chase & Status	RAM	
3 November	"Uninvited"	Freemasons featuring Bailey Tzuke	Loaded	
10 November	"Let Me Think About It"	Ida Corr vs. Fedde le Grand	Data	
17 November	"Let Me Think About It"	Ida Corr vs. Fedde le Grand	Data	
24 November	"Let Me Think About It"	Ida Corr vs. Fedde le Grand	Data	
1 December	"Heartbroken"	T2 featuring Jodie Aysha	2NV/AATW/MNB	
8 December	"Heartbroken"	T2 featuring Jodie Aysha	2NV/AATW/MNB	
15 December	"Heartbroken"	T2 featuring Jodie Aysha	2NV/AATW/MNB	
22 December	"Heartbroken"	T2 featuring Jodie Aysha	2NV/AATW/MNB	
29 December	"Heartbroken"	T2 featuring Jodie Aysha	2NV/AATW/MNB	

== See also ==
- List of number-one singles of 2007 (UK)
- List of UK Independent Singles Chart number ones of 2007
- List of UK Rock & Metal Singles Chart number ones of 2007
- List of UK Dance Albums Chart number ones of 2007
