= Sound (TV series) =

- Starring: Annie Mac; Nick Grimshaw
- Opening theme: "Leap of Faith"

Original release
- Network: BBC Two
- Release: 2007 – June 2009

Sound is a weekly music, entertainment and chat show broadcast by BBC Two as part of the BBC Switch teen strand. It was presented by BBC Radio 1 DJs Annie Mac and Nick Grimshaw.

The show first aired in 2007 and the first series featured various bands performing out on location. A second series returned in September 2008; however, the show had been markedly revamped. It now came from a studio apartment location and featured more guest chat and less performances. It introduced new segments like Nick's desk item 'The Grimshaw Files' - a comedic look at the world of music and entertainment, and Annie's New Music Forecast - in which Annie showcased three new tracks to check out that week.

The second series ran until December 2008. A third series ran from January to June 2009, and added comedian Holly Walsh to the presenting team.

The theme song of the show is "Leap of Faith" by Hadouken!.
