= Crank It Up (Hadouken! song) =

Single by Hadouken!

from the album Music for an Accelerated Culture
- Released: (United Kingdom) 15 June 2008 (Download); 7 July 2008 (Physical)
- Recorded: 2007–2008
- Genre: Grime, new rave
- Length: 3:00
- Label: Surface Noise/Atlantic Records
- Songwriter: James Smith

Hadouken! singles chronology
"Declaration of War" (2008)	"Crank It Up" (2008)	"M.A.D." (2009)

Music video
- "Crank It Up" on YouTube

"Crank It Up" is the fifth single from English grime band Hadouken!'s first album Music for an Accelerated Culture. It was released on 7 July 2008 following the recent releases of their singles Get Smashed Gate Crash and Declaration of War from the same album.

== Track listing ==
=== CD single ===
1. "Crank It Up (Radio Edit)" 2:38

=== Digital Download EP ===
1. "Crank It Up" 3:00
2. "Crank It Up (Noisia Remix)" 4:31
3. "Crank It Up (Does It Offend You Remix)" 4:11
4. "Crank It Up (The Clik Clik Remix)" 3:42

== Music video ==
The music video for Crank It Up shows Hadouken! lead singer James Smith first emerge from a Hadouken! decorated tape after a series of newspaper pattern based images, showing outlines of band members. The other band members then appear in place of Smith: Alice Spooner, Daniel "Pilau" Rice, Chris Purcell and Nick Rice in a "tearing away paper" animation. The band are then shown performing the song together with a series of images in the background and flashing lights. Soon after, the band are seen performing next to a series of stacked televisions. Members of the band can be seen on the TV screens, and it often zooms in on them in different places, including a street scene. Towards the end of the video, a computer monitor screen can be seen, with animated silhouettes of the band members shown. It appears as if many windows of the same animations showing the band members are opening on the screen. At the end of the video, the trend of bright images and animations continue as more silhouettes can be seen in front of a multi-coloured background. The video finishes by zooming away from one television stacked among others, next to where the band were performing earlier on in the video.

On music site Gigwise, the video is described as "a riot from start to finish".

== Reception ==
Sarah Walters, of Manchester Evening News, published a review of Crank It Up, saying "Yes, it's another glistening nugget in their often incoherent brand of obnoxious digital noise, garage beats and hip-hop patter, but this time there's something oddly right about it."

Another review of the single, on music site Noize Makes Enemies, claims "The frenetic-paced ‘Crank It Up’ is, it could be said, the album's defining track, laying out the rave-reviving, pigeonhole-swerving, youth-defining spirit at its core. It's a sonic punk-rock-rave monster – a call to arms for a web-savvy generation to 'show some love', and a nod to the file-sharing, Myspace-bound, digital revolution that spawned the Leeds-formed 5 piece."
