= Not Here to Please You =

EP by Hadouken!
- Released: 12 November 2007
- Recorded: 2007
- Genre: Grindie, indie rock
- Length: 35:18
- Label: Atlantic

Hadouken! chronology
Mixtape (2007)	Not Here to Please You (2007)	Music for an Accelerated Culture (2008)

Singles from Not Here to Please You
- 1. "Leap of Faith" Released: 12 November 2007; 2. "Love, Sweat and Beer" Released: 18 November 2007; 3. "Bounce" Released: 3 July 2007

Professional ratings
Review scores
Source	Rating
NME	8/10 stars
Female First	3/5 stars
The Guardian	not rated
City Life	3/5 stars
XFM	not rated
Rockfeedback	4/5 stars
Digital Spy	2/5 stars
Yahoo!	5/10 stars

Not Here to Please You is an EP by British band Hadouken! released in USB form and digital download only.

The band announced on 1 October 2007 that they would be doing something "slightly different" for their second mixtape. With the debut mixtape being released only on the Internet, it was announced that the second mixtape would be released in stores, as a 128MB USB memory stick.

The mixtape was set to feature 6 new Hadouken! songs, including the single "Leap of Faith" and a remix of a previous single, "Liquid Lives".

On 9 October 2007, the new track "Girls" was added to the band's website, as a flash banner, that when clicked played a low quality version of the new track. Upon the USB's release, some Mac users had problems with the product, however a fix was quickly posted on Hadouken!'s website.

On 18 November, "Leap of Faith" and "Love, Sweat and Beer" were released as online digital singles.

On 7 January 2008, tracks from the mixtape including "Leap of Faith" and "Girls" were released on iTunes and 7digital; the EP titled Love, Sweat and Beer EP contained four of the tracks from the mixtape.

== Track listing ==
No.	Title	Length
1.	"Bounce"	2:33
2.	"Bloc Party - The Prayer (Hadouken! mix)"	2:25
3.	"Leap of Faith"	3:16
4.	"Liquid Lives (Noisia Remix)"	3:55
5.	"Liquid Lives (H! re-rub)"	0:58
6.	"Girls"	3:12
7.	"Plan B - No More Eatin' (Hadouken! mix)"	3:23
8.	"Love, Sweat and Beer"	2:57
9.	"Bolt Action Five - Tree Friend Tree Foe (Hadouken! mix)"	3:07
10.	"Tuning In (H! Kitsune mix)"	4:04
11.	"Dance Lessons"	3:22
12.	"You Can't Be That"	2:00

- Tracks 4 and 12 were B-sides to "Liquid Lives"
- Track 10 was a B-side to "That Boy That Girl"

=== Pure Grove version ===
1. Free Hadouken! signed poster
