= Future Perfect (Loadstar album) =

2013 studio album by Loadstar

Studio album by Loadstar
- Released: 26 May 2013
- Recorded: 2010–13
- Genre: Drum and bass; dubstep; electro house; grime
- Label: RAM Records
- Producer: Xample; Lomax

Loadstar chronology
Future Perfect (2013)	I Need The Night (2017)

Singles from Future Perfect
- 1. "Black & White" Released: 9 December 2012; 2. "Refuse to Love" Released: 21 April 2013

Future Perfect (Remixes)

Remix album by Loadstar
- Released: 15 December 2013
- Recorded: 2013
- Genre: Drum and bass; dubstep
- Label: RAM Records
- Producer: Xample; Lomax

Loadstar chronology
Future Perfect (2013)	Future Perfect (Remixes) (2013)

Future Perfect is the debut studio album by British production duo Loadstar. The album was released on 26 May 2013 through RAM Records. Loadstar appeared on DJ Target and MistaJam's BBC Radio 1Xtra shows to promote the album. They also hosted an Essential Mix on BBC Radio 1. The album charted at number 168 on the UK Albums Chart and also on the dance and indie charts.

== Background and recording ==
Some of the initial ideas for album tracks, such as "Eat My Tears", were created as early as 2010. "Losing You" was another of the first to be produced. The duo produced probably "over 100 tracks" since the album concept came about, but only a few made the final cut. In May 2012, the album was considered "finished" and due for October 2012 release, but the release was pushed forward to May 2013 after more tracks were produced for it. Speaking about the album, Nick said the following:

“We’ve had time to really go deep into our ideas and fine tune how we wanted to present the album. It’s about finding the balance between the dancefloor D&B that people know us for and trying to show a different side to us like our deeper material, the dubstep stuff, even hip-hop influences. That’s why it’s taken so long to get it right. Loadstar has been a journey of discovery for us. We were getting associated with our old sound for a long time, Loadstar, and notably this album, is a new beginning. That’s why it couldn’t be ‘D&B bangers album with nothing in between’ album. There’s more to albums than that, and there’s more to us than that, too…”

The Future Perfect remix album was released on 15 December 2013. Loadstar hosted a remix contest for the track "Dr. Karg", choosing Λlity and Abstr4ct as the winners whose remixes feature on the release. They also produced a VIP mix of "Losing You" featuring Jenn D to appear on the release alongside the winners and three RAM Records artists. Loadstar have also created a VIP mix of "Warrior" featuring Jakes, which features on the Andy C compilation Nightlife 6.

== Writing and composition ==
=== Influences and themes ===
The duo were influenced by the breakbeats on The Chemical Brothers' album Exit Planet Dust, as well as Dillinja's album Cybotron which inspired Nick's melodic touches and Gavin's technical skills. Nick was majorly influenced by Leftfield's album Leftism, and it played a key part in his love for dance music.

The album title Future Perfect originated from a demo song they wrote, which ended up not making it onto the album, and was also inspired by its grammatical sense. The duo "just wanted it to be an artist album, a piece of work that summed us up as a collective, and a complete project and that had all our styles and influences in there."

== Singles ==
- "Black & White" (featuring Benny Banks) is the album's lead single. It was released on 9 December 2012 alongside the B-side "Vatican Roulette" and several remixes. The single received positive feedback, accumulating over one million YouTube views and receiving frequent airplay on BBC Radio 1Xtra.
- "Refuse to Love" is the album's second single. It was released on 21 April 2013 alongside the B-side "Flight" and several remixes. The single was less successful than "Black & White", but still received notable airplay. Takura appeared on MistaJam's 1Xtra show to do a live PA on the track.
- "Warrior" (featuring Jakes) is a promotional single from the album. It is also one of the four tracks included in the double-vinyl EP release of the album (among "Scorpio", "Don't Wanna Be Alone" and "Be There"). The song was never given independent release, but it was named Zane Lowe's Hottest Record in the World on Radio 1 on 30 May 2013.

== Reception ==
Professional ratings
Review scores
Source	Rating
The Guardian	2/5 stars
Drum and Bass Arena	(favourable)
Data Transmission	(favourable)
The Frontliner	(favourable)
RWD Magazine	5/5 stars
DJ Mag Canada	8/10

The album received mixed to positive reviews from critics, but failed to chart despite a TV ad campaign. However, the album received positive reviews from renowned dance music blogs Mixmag and DJ Mag. Mixmag said "the duo primed for D&B domination" and that the album "adeptly works the line between stadium anthems and underground bangers". RWD Magazine credited the album as "fusing perfectly the intensity of D&B". DJ Mag Canada gave the album 8/10 and said the album is "15 tracks of summer blockbuster dramatics and air punching energy". They also said the following:

"In a release with fifteen tracks, we can’t expect one anthem after another, with the occurrence of such albums being rare. What we do get from this particular LP is a variety of tracks which have already been dominating mixes and live sets for weeks and will continue to do so through the future. What we also get from Future Perfect are tracks that are going to provide a foundation for both themselves and other producers to develop their sound while inspiring continued growth and the blurring of boundaries."

== Track listing ==
No.	Title	Length
1.	"Do You Feel Me" (featuring Scrufizzer)	2:33
2.	"Refuse to Love" (featuring Takura)	4:12
3.	"Warrior" (featuring Jakes)	3:50
4.	"Be There"	3:58
5.	"Black & White" (featuring Benny Banks)	3:15
6.	"Scorpio"	4:11
7.	"Don't Wanna Be Alone"	4:13
8.	"Losing You" (featuring Jenn D)	4:30
9.	"Boa" (featuring Hadouken!)	3:44
10.	"Sliders" (featuring Meleka)	3:05
11.	"Eat My Tears"	4:49
12.	"Drowning"	4:52
13.	"Give It To Me"	4:10
14.	"Memories"	4:28
15.	"Distance" (featuring Lloyd Yates)	4:03

Deluxe edition bonus tracks
No.	Title	Length
16.	"Dr. Karg"	4:10
17.	"Flight"	4:19
18.	"Need You"	3:59
19.	"Bomber"	4:30
20.	"Passenger"	4:35
21.	"Second Skin"	3:44
22.	"Lancelot"	4:06

iTunes Store bonus videos
No.	Title	Length
23.	"Space Between" (music video)	3:03
24.	"Black & White" (music video)	3:20
25.	"Refuse to Love" (music video)	3:20

Signed CD bonus disc
No.	Title	Length
1.	"Dr. Karg"	4:10
2.	"Lancelot"	4:06
3.	"Need You"	3:59
4.	"Second Skin"	3:44

Double-vinyl EP
No.	Title	Length
1.	"Warrior" (featuring Jakes)	3:50
2.	"Scorpio"	4:11
3.	"Don't Wanna Be Alone"	4:13
4.	"Be There"	3:58

Future Perfect (Remixes)
No.	Title	Length
1.	"Losing You" (featuring Jenn D) (VIP Mix)	3:50
2.	"Need You" (Frankee Remix)	4:13
3.	"Give It To Me" (DC Breaks Remix)	4:26
4.	"Eat My Tears" (René LaVice Remix)	3:41

Future Perfect (Remixes) - Digital bonus tracks
No.	Title	Length
5.	"Dr. Karg" (Λlity Remix)	6:01
6.	"Dr. Karg" (Abstr4kt Remix)	4:59

Notes

- Track listing and credits from album booklet.
- "Don't Wanna Be Alone" features uncredited vocals from Scarlett Quinn.
- "Drowning" features uncredited vocals from L. James.
- "Second Skin" features uncredited vocals from Mark Underdown.

== Charts ==
Chart (2013)	Peak position
UK Albums (OCC)	168
UK Dance Albums (OCC)	18
UK Indie Albums (OCC)	30
UK Indie Breakers (OCC)	7

== Release history ==
Region	Date	Format	Label
Worldwide	26 May 2013	CD, digital download	RAM Records
