= X Marks Destination =

Studio album by The Whip
- Released: March 24, 2008
- Genre: Dance-punk; Alternative dance Techno; New wave
- Length: 52:00
- Label: Southern Fried Records (UK); Razor & Tie Records (US)
- Producer: Jim Abbiss, Liam Howe

Professional ratings
Review scores
Source	Rating
Allmusic	3/5 stars
The Guardian	2/5 stars
Spin	2/5 stars
Now	3/5 stars
URB	3.5/5 stars

X Marks Destination is a debut studio album from the British alternative dance band The Whip.

== Reception ==
X Marks Destination was released on March 24, 2008 in the United Kingdom, and on March 3, 2009 in the United States.

Initial critical response to X Marks Destination was average. At Metacritic, which assigns a normalized rating out of 100 to reviews from mainstream critics, the album has received an average score of 59, based on 7 reviews.

== Track listing ==
=== Standard UK edition ===
All songs by Bruce Carter and Danny Saville

1. "Trash" – 6:20
2. "Frustration" – 4:51
3. "Fire" – 5:11
4. "Save My Soul" – 5:09
5. "Sirens" – 4:17
6. "Divebomb" – 5:39
7. "Blackout" – 6:10
8. "Muzzle #1" – 4:50
9. "Sister Siam" – 4:43
10. "Dubsex" – 4:10

=== US iTunes release ===
Along with the 10 original tracks listed in the standard UK release, 6 remixes are added after the first-ten main tracks and all ten tracks have slight changes in time duration.

1. "Trash" – 6:20
2. "Frustration" – 4:51
3. "Fire" – 5:11
4. "Save My Soul" – 5:09
5. "Sirens" – 4:18
6. "Divebomb" – 5:38
7. "Blackout" – 6:10
8. "Muzzle #1" – 4:50
9. "Sister Siam" – 4:43
10. "Dubsex" – 4:07
11. "Blackout (Shinichi Osawa Remix)" – 5:40
12. "Muzzle #1 (Bloody Beetroots Remix)" - 4:06
13. "Sister Siam (Bitchee Bitchee Ya Ya Ya Remix)" - 4:49
14. "Trash (Crookers Remix)" - 6:01
15. "Trash (South Central Remix)" - 5:43
16. "Sister Siam (Justin Robertson Dub)" - 5:36

== Charts ==
Chart (2008)	Peak position
UK Albums Chart	75

== Personnel ==
- Jim Abbiss – producer
- Bruce Carter – engineer, group member
- Ian Dowling – assistant engineer
- Liam Howe – producer
- B.J. Ben Mason – assistant engineer
- Nathan Sudders – group member
- Fiona Daniel – group member
- Danny Saville – group member
- Damian Taylor – mixing
- Richard Wilkinson – engineer
