= List of UK Dance Albums Chart number ones of 2007 =

These are the Official Charts Company's UK Dance Chart number-one albums of 2007. The dates listed in the menus below represent the Saturday after the Sunday the chart was announced, as per the way the dates are given in chart publications such as the ones produced by Billboard, Guinness, and Virgin.

== Chart history ==
Issue date	Album	Artist(s)	Record label	Ref.
6 January	The Annual 2007	Various Artists	Ministry of Sound	
13 January	The Warning	Hot Chip	EMI	
20 January	Ultimate NSG 2	Various Artists	AATW/UMTV	
27 January	The Warning	Hot Chip	EMI	
3 February	Shakedown	Freemasons	Loaded	
10 February	Overtones	Just Jack	Mercury	
17 February	Overtones	Just Jack	Mercury	
24 February	Hed Kandi - Twisted Disco	Various Artists	Hedkandi	
3 March	The Mash Up Mix 2007	Various Artists	Ministry of Sound	
10 March	Defected in the House - Miami 07	Various Artists	In The House	
17 March	Defected in the House - Miami 07	Various Artists	In The House	
24 March	Sound of Silver	LCD Soundsystem	DFA/EMI	
31 March	Sound of Silver	LCD Soundsystem	DFA/EMI	
7 April	Hed Kandi - Disco Kandi - The Mix	Various Artists	Hed Kandi	
14 April	One Plus One - Zabiela/Fanciulli	Various Artists	Ministry of Sound	
21 April	Everytime We Touch	Cascada	All Around the World	
28 April	Version	Mark Ronson	Columbia	
5 May	Version	Mark Ronson	Columbia	
12 May	Version	Mark Ronson	Columbia	
19 May	Soundboy Rock	Groove Armada	Columbia	
26 May	Soundboy Rock	Groove Armada	Columbia	
2 June	Version	Mark Ronson	Columbia	
9 June	Soundboy Rock	Groove Armada	Columbia	
16 June	Maths + English	Dizzee Rascal	XL	
23 June	Maths + English	Dizzee Rascal	XL	
30 June	Cross	Justice	Because Music	
7 July	I Created Disco	Calvin Harris	Columbia	
14 July	We Are the Night	The Chemical Brothers	Virgin	
21 July	We Are the Night	The Chemical Brothers	Virgin	
28 July	We Are the Night	The Chemical Brothers	Virgin	
4 August	Version	Mark Ronson	Columbia	
11 August	Version	Mark Ronson	Columbia	
18 August	Version	Mark Ronson	Columbia	
25 August	Hed Kandi - The Mix summer 2007	Various Artists	Hed Kandi	
1 September	Hed Kandi - The Mix summer 2007	Various Artists	Hed Kandi	
8 September	Hed Kandi - The Mix summer 2007	Various Artists	Hed Kandi	
15 September	Gatecrasher Immortal	Various Artists	Ministry of Sound	
22 September	Gatecrasher Immortal	Various Artists	Ministry of Sound	
29 September	Hed Kandi - Back To Love	Various Artists	Ministry of Sound	
6 October	John Digweed - Transitions - Vol. 3	Various Artists	Ministry of Sound	
13 October	Version	Mark Ronson	Columbia	
20 October	Version	Mark Ronson	Columbia	
27 October	Version	Mark Ronson	Columbia	
3 November	Version	Mark Ronson	Columbia	
10 November	Version	Mark Ronson	Columbia	
17 November	Clubland 12	Various Artists	AATW/UMTV	
24 November	Version	Mark Ronson	Columbia	
1 December	Hed Kandi - The Mix 2008	Various Artists	Hed Kandi	
8 December	Hed Kandi - The Mix 2008	Various Artists	Hed Kandi	
15 December	Ministry of Sound - Anthems 1991-2008	Various Artists	Ministry of Sound	
22 December	Ministry of Sound - Anthems 1991-2008	Various Artists	Ministry of Sound	
29 December	Ministry of Sound - Anthems 1991-2008	Various Artists	Ministry of Sound	

== See also ==
- List of number-one albums of 2007 (UK)
- List of UK Dance Chart number-one singles of 2007
- List of UK R&B Chart number-one albums of 2007
