= Welly (band) =

English indie pop band

- Welly playing at Newport's Le Pub

Background information
- Origin: Southampton, England
- Genres: Indie pop; Dance-punk
- Years active: 2021-present
- Labels: The Boom Boom Palace; Goo; Vertex
- Members: Elliot Hall; Jacob Whitear; Matt Gleeson; Joe Holden-Brown; Hanna Witkamp
- Past members: Finlay Leon; Lois Lock
- Website: worldwidewelly.com

Welly are an English indie pop band formed in Southampton in 2021. The band's line-up consists of lead vocalist Elliot Hall, bassist Jacob Whitear, guitarists Matt Gleeson and Joe Holden-Brown, and keyboardist Hanna Witkamp. Their debut single, "Me and Your Mates", was released in 2022, and their debut studio album, Big in the Suburbs, was released on 21 March 2025.

== History ==
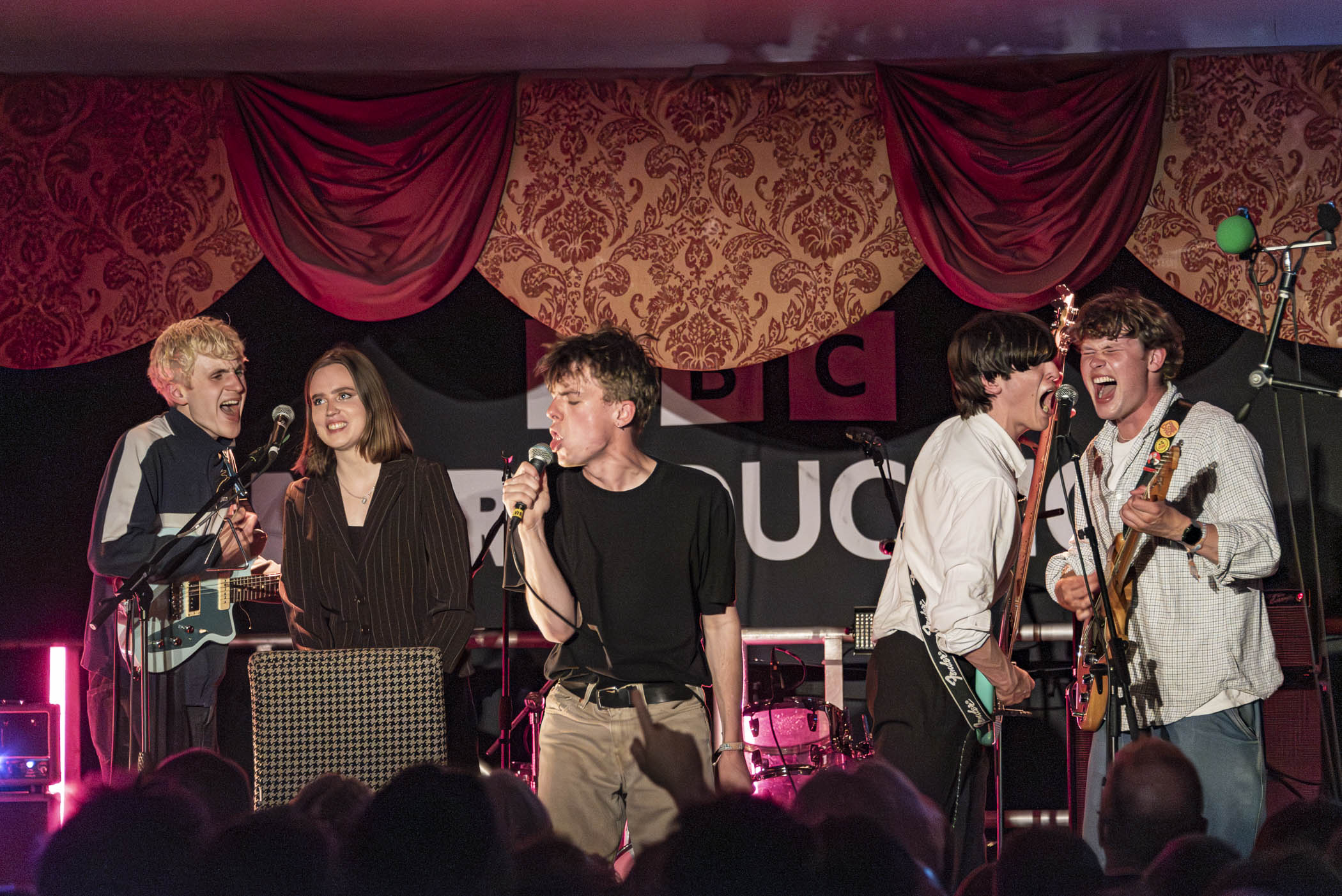
Welly performing at The Great Escape Festival on 15 May 2025

In 2021, lead vocalist Elliot Hall, bassist Jacob Whitear, guitarists Matt Gleeson and Joe Holden-Brown, egg shaker Finlay Leon and an unknown keyboardist formed Welly. Hall and Gleeson were also in a band called Simulator, which disbanded in April 2022. Welly's debut single, "Me and Your Mates", was released in May of that year. In June 2022, the band played the Glastonbury Festival's Croissant Neuf Tent. In summer 2022, Lois Lock joined the band as a synthesizer player. That same year, the band recorded a live album, Welly: Live in a Village Hall, as well as its accompanying film, in an empty village hall. The album was originally scheduled for either December 2022 or January 2023, but was eventually released on 18 February 2023. They played more shows in the spring of 2023; however, Leon and Lock had since left the band, and Hanna Witkamp joined them as a keyboardist.

In March 2024, Welly began releasing a series of singles throughout the year, including "Shopping", "Soak Up The Culture" "Deere John", and "Cul-De-Sac". In August 2018, the band started their 'National Service' tour. In November 2024, Welly announced their debut studio album, Big In The Suburbs, and released the title track as a single; they also confirmed that all of the previous 2024 singles would also be featured on the album. On 6 February 2025, the band released the sixth and final single off the album, "The Roundabout Racehorse". Big In The Suburbs was released on 21 March 2025.

== Members ==
- Elliot Hall – Lead vocals (2021–present)
- Jacob Whitear – Bass, backup vocals (2021–present)
- Matt Gleeson – Guitar, backup vocals (2021–present)
- Joe Holden-Brown – Guitar, backup vocals (2021–present)
- Hanna Witkamp – Keyboards, drum machine, backup vocals (2023–present)

=== Former members ===
- Finlay Leon – Egg shaker, backup vocals (2021–2023)
- Lois Lock – Synths, drum machine, backup vocals (2022–2023)

== Discography ==
=== Albums ===
==== Studio albums ====
Title	Album details	Peak chart positions
Title	Album details	UK
Big In The Suburbs	Released: 21 March 2025; Label: Vertex Music; Formats: CD, vinyl, digital download, streaming	22

==== Live albums ====
Title	Album details
Welly: Live in a Village Hall	Released: 18 February 2023; Label: Goo Records; Formats: Digital download, streaming

=== Singles ===
Title	Year	Peak chart positions	Album
Title	Year	UK	Album
"Me and Your Mates"	2022	—	Non-album single
"Home For The Weekend (Live In A Village Hall)"	2023	—	Welly: Live in a Village Hall
"Shopping"	2024	7	Big In The Suburbs
"Soak Up The Culture"	2024	—	Big In The Suburbs
"Deere John"	2024	—	Big In The Suburbs
"Cul-De-Sac"	2024	—	Big In The Suburbs
"Big In The Suburbs"	2024	—	Big In The Suburbs
"The Roundabout Racehorse"	2025	—	Big In The Suburbs
