= Loadstar (duo) =

British music production duo

- Also known as: Xample & Lomax
- Origin: Bristol, England
- Genres: Drum and bass; dubstep; electro house; grime
- Years active: 2009–2020
- Label: RAM Records
- Members: Gavin "Xample" Harris; Nick "Lomax" Hill
- Website: loadstar-music.com

Loadstar were a music production duo from Bristol, United Kingdom. They produced mainly drum and bass, while also working in other genres such as dubstep and electro. The duo consisted of Gavin "Xample" Harris and Nick "Lomax" Hill. They previously produced under the alias Xample & Lomax.

== Career ==
=== 2007–2009: Record deal and formation ===
The two artists met while Bristol-born Xample was studying sociology at Liverpool University. Lomax was one-third of the production trio Holdtight at the time. Xample booked Holdtight for a drum and bass event, and Lomax moved to Bristol shortly afterwards. Xample sent some tracks to Andy C via instant message, and soon afterwards was signed to his label RAM Records. The duo's first release was the track "The Latter" which was released on 28 May 2007. It featured as a B-side to Xample's track "Lowdown" and was released on RAM Records. Their second collaboration was "Contra" (released as a single on 2 February 2009). Throughout 2009 they shared studio space and began to release more material together.

=== 2010: Formation of Loadstar ===
On 26 April 2010, they released a single on RAM titled "Remember / Rushin Dragon". On 27 September 2010, they released their first song under the Loadstar alias: "Link to the Past / Rapidas". To tie in with the song title they looked through old rave tape packs and computer game cassettes until they found an old E-mu sampler. The old interface took a long time to load each sample and displayed a spinning star while loading. Hence the moniker "Loadstar" was born.

=== 2010–2011: Commercial breakthrough ===
During late 2010, the duo also started producing for Hadouken!, starting with their singles "Mecha Love" and "Oxygen". On 14 November 2010, their remix of Example's "Two Lives" was released as their first Loadstar remix. In 2011 collaborations became more frequent, including remixes for Breakage, Chase & Status and Jess Mills. They received airplay from major radio stations such as BBC Radio 1, and were asked by Annie Mac to create a mashup of Jessie J's "Price Tag". On 28 March 2011, they released the second Loadstar single, titled "Space Between / BLVD". "Space Between" was their first track to have an official music video. On 24 July 2011, their track "Kaoss" was released as part of RAM 100, the label's hundredth release. They went on to release the single "Berlin / Hit the Ground" and a remix of Ed Sheeran's "You Need Me, I Don't Need You" in 2011.

=== 2012–2013: Every Weekend and Future Perfect ===
2012 saw a redesign of Loadstar's image: they created a new logo and began to gain recognition from a wider audience. The duo remixed "Tommy's Theme" by Noisia which appeared on the special edition of their album Split the Atom, re-released by mau5trap. They produced "Parasite", the lead single from Hadouken!'s third studio album Every Weekend. It was released as a free download on 11 April 2012, and the song was later released alongside remixes on 19 May. They also produced the majority of tracks on Every Weekend, including the album's fifth single "Levitate" which was co-produced by Noisia. On 8 May, they released a free two-track single titled "Second Skin / Terror Drone". On 8 July, they released their first extended play titled "Passenger / Bomber", alongside a remix of "Passenger" by Culprate. In September, they released a remix of Excision's "Sleepless", as part of his mau5trap remix album X Rated: The Remixes. In November, they released a remix of Rudimental's single Not Giving In featuring John Newman and Alex Clare. They released a remix of The Good Natured's song "5-HT" as a free download in December. Their most popular release to date, "Black and White" featuring Benny Banks, was released on 9 December 2012. The official video has accumulated over one million YouTube views. It was later announced that this was to be the first single from their debut album.

It was announced in February that the duo would be releasing their debut album, titled Future Perfect, on 5 May 2013. However, this was later delayed to 26 May. On 8 February, they released the track "Drowning" from the album as a free download. On 21 April 2013, "Refuse to Love / Flight" featuring uncredited vocals from Takura was released as the album's second single. On 9 May 2013, they announced the fifteen-track standard edition album track list. It includes guest appearances from Scrufizzer, Takura, Jakes, Benny Banks, Jenn D, Hadouken! and Lloyd Yates. The deluxe edition of the album features seven extra tracks. On 7 June 2014, "Give It To Me" appeared in the pilot episode of American crime drama Power.

=== 2013–2016: RAMLife - Loadstar ===
In 2013, the duo produced grime and UK rap songs for Dot Rotten, Benny Banks and Scrufizzer. They also produced P Money's 2013 single "Round the Clock", the title track from his EP on Rinse. "Bomber" was featured in Gran Turismo 6 in 2013. The first single after Future Perfect, entitled "Stepped Outside" / "Under Pressure", was released on 6 April 2014. On 17 April, "Stepped Outside" was added to BBC Radio 1Xtra's C-list and it rose to their B-list on 24 April, staying in rotation for the following week. The song features uncredited vocals from Caan. On 13 July 2014, Dot Rotten released his second studio album Interview for free download, which included the Loadstar production "Determination".

On 18 August 2014, RAM Records launched RAMLife, a series of albums containing the very best of recent RAM Records releases and other songs from other labels and artists with an hour long continuous mix from the featured artist. The first instalment was presented by Loadstar including some of their most popular tracks.

The duo's next single, "Native" / "Once Again", was released on 28 August 2015, over a year later from their RAMLife album and features uncredited vocals on "Native" from Danny Shah. On 1 December Loadstar was a song titled "Keeping Me High" featuring the Scottish indie band Prides. The following single, "Lifeline" / "Switch", was released on 5 February 2016. "Lifeline" features uncredited vocals from Cleo Tighe of The Six. The second single of 2016 titled "Red Rock" / "On The Wheels", this was released on 24 June. their final song of 2016 was titled "Change the Channel" / "Encarta", and was released on 14 October. All these singles were non-album singles.

=== 2017–2020: I Need the Night ===
On 20 January 2017, the duo released "I Need the Night" as the lead single from their forthcoming second studio album of the same name. The album's second single, "Diamonds", features vocals from Takura, and was released 23 March 2017. Its third single, "Give Yourself", was released on 21 July 2017.

On 2 July, Loadstar also released a single entitled "Ring Ring" in collaboration with UK rap artist and former Section Boyz member Reeko Squeeze.

== Discography ==
=== Studio albums ===
- Future Perfect (2013)
- I Need the Night (2017)

=== Singles ===
Year	Song	Label	Release	UK Physical Singles	UK Indie
2009	"Contra" (as Xample & Lomax)	RAM Records	Non-album singles	65	6
2009	"Remember" / "Rushin Dragon" (as Xample & Lomax)	RAM Records	Non-album singles	71	–
2010	"Link to the Past" / "Rapidas"	RAM Records	Non-album singles	–	–
2010	"Space Between" / "BLVD"	RAM Records	Non-album singles	–	–
2011	"Berlin" / "Hit the Ground"	RAM Records	Non-album singles	–	–
2012	"Second Skin" / "Terror Drone"	RAM Records	Future Perfect	–	–
2012	"Passenger" / "Bomber"	RAM Records	Future Perfect	–	–
2012	"Black & White" (featuring Benny Banks)	RAM Records	Future Perfect	–	–
2013	"Refuse to Love"	RAM Records	Future Perfect	–	–
2014	"Stepped Outside" / "Under Pressure"	RAM Records	Non-album singles	–	–
2015	"Native" / "Once Again"	RAM Records	Non-album singles	–	–
2016	"Lifeline" / "Switch"	RAM Records	Non-album singles	–	–
2016	"Red Rock" / "On The Wheels"	RAM Records	Non-album singles	–	–
2016	"Change The Channel" / "Encarta"	RAM Records	Non-album singles	–	–
2017	"I Need the Night" / "Guerrilla"	RAM Records	I Need the Night	–	–
2017	"Diamonds" (featuring Takura)	RAM Records	I Need the Night	–	–
2017	"Ring Ring" (Reeko Squeeze vs. Loadstar)	Self-released	Non-album single	–	–
2017	"Give Yourself"	RAM Records	I Need the Night	–	–
2017	"Run Down (Control)"	RAM Records	I Need the Night	–	–

=== Other appearances ===
Year	Song	Album	Label
2011	"Kaoss"	RAM 100	RAM Records
2015	"Dune"	RAMsterdam Drum & Bass 2015	RAM Records

=== Remixes ===
Year	Song	Artist
2010	"Two Lives"	Example
2011	"Fighting Fire"	Breakage featuring Jess Mills
2011	"Blind Faith"	Chase & Status featuring Liam Bailey
2011	"Price Tag"	Jessie J featuring B.o.B
2011	"The Shield and the Sword"	Clare Maguire
2011	"Illmerica"	Wolfgang Gartner
2011	"Live For What I'd Die For"	Jess Mills
2011	"You Need Me, I Don't Need You"	Ed Sheeran
2012	"Tommy's Theme"	Noisia
2012	"Sleepless"	Excision
2012	"New York"	Angel Haze
2012	"Not Giving In"	Rudimental featuring John Newman & Alex Clare
2012	"5-HT"	The Good Natured
2012	"You're the One"	Charli XCX
2012	"Lose It"	Jenn D
2013	"Lifted"	Naughty Boy featuring Emeli Sandé
2013	"Losing You" (VIP)	Loadstar featuring Jenn D
2013	"Warrior" (VIP)	Loadstar featuring Jakes
2015	"Under Pressure" (VIP)	Loadstar
2015	"House Every Weekend"	David Zowie
2016	"Bike Engine"	Jacob Plant & Stylo G
2017	"I Don't Know"	GotSome featuring Lisa Kekaula
2018	"Light Up"	Hybrid

=== Production credits ===
Year	Title	Artist	Album
2010	"Mecha Love"	Hadouken!	Every Weekend
2010	"Oxygen"	Hadouken!	Every Weekend
2012	"Parasite"	Hadouken!	Every Weekend
2013	"Levitate" (additional production by Noisia)	Hadouken!	Every Weekend
2013	"As One"	Hadouken!	Every Weekend
2013	"Stop Time"	Hadouken!	Every Weekend
2013	"The Comedown"	Hadouken!	Every Weekend
2013	"Round the Clock"	P Money	Round the Clock EP
2014	"Determination"	Dot Rotten	Interview
2014	"For a Minute"	M.O	Non-album singles
2014	"Dance on My Own"	M.O	Non-album singles
