= Gemini (musician) =

English musician

- Born: Thomas Slinger; 1 June 1990 (age 36); Leicester, England
- Genres: Electronic, electro house, pop, dubstep, drum and bass
- Occupations: Vocalist, musician, songwriter, producer, DJ
- Years active: 2010–present
- Label: Inspected

Thomas Slinger, known professionally as Gemini, is an English producer, songwriter, vocalist and DJ, active between 2010 and 2016.

Born and raised in Leicester, he soon discovered a talent for the production of electronic dance music (particularly dubstep) and released his first EP, Blue, on 14 February 2011 while studying at Leeds University. He is co-owner of Inspected Records and, as of September 2016, has released four EPs (Blue, Graduation, Fire Inside, and Mercury) with the label. He has featured heavily on BBC Radio 1's night time shows, especially Zane Lowe, Nick Grimshaw and Annie Mac. He appeared in Radio 1's Festival 2011 and also produced a minimix for BBC Radio 1Xtra's MistaJam.

On 2 April 2013, he launched his Lonely Hearts series with the first edition of Fire Inside including vocals by Greta Svabo Bech and himself. He self-published the releases of this series as limited editions.

After a hiatus of over three years, Gemini released a single on 5 February 2016, "Time To Share".

== Discography ==
Title	Release date	Type	Label/Catalogue No.	Chart Position
"Down/Electric Rain"	5 July 2010	Single	Breed 12 Inches – BRD006	
Blue	14 February 2011	EP	Inspected Records – INSP001	
Without You	28 March 2011	EP	Beta Recordings – BETA027	
Graduation	19 September 2011	EP	Inspected Records – INSP003	
Fire Inside	2 April 2012	EP	Inspected Records – INSP006	UK Dance #28; UK Indie #23; UK Indie Breakers #5
"3D Romeo" (featuring Fabienne)	10 October 2012	Single	Inspected Records – INSP012D	
"Beyond the Shadows" (with KOAN Sound, Culprate & Asa)	7 November 2012	Charity single	Inspected Records	
Mercury	19 November 2012	EP	Inspected Records – INSP012	
"Time to Share"	5 February 2016	Single	Tree of Life / Kobalt	

== Lonely Hearts series ==
Title	Featuring	Release date
Fire Inside	Greta Svabo Bech	2 April 2013

== Remixes ==
Year	Artist	Track
2010	Hadouken!	Oxygen
2011	Kelis	Brave
2011	Diddy - Dirty Money feat. Swizz Beatz	Ass on the Floor
2011	Fenech-Soler	Stop & Stare
2011	BT	The Emergency
2011	Ed Sheeran	You Need Me, I Don't Need You
2011	Lana Del Rey	Born To Die
2012	Emeli Sandé	My Kind of Love
2012	Swedish House Mafia vs. Tinie Tempah	Miami 2 Ibiza
2012	Drake feat. The Weeknd	Crew Love (Cover)
2013	KillSonik	Slaughterhouse
2013	Ellie Goulding	Explosions
2013	John Newman	Love Me Again
2014	Hobbie Stuart	Still Here
2014	Laura Welsh	Break The Fall
2014	Amy Steele	Bury You Deep
