= Leap of Faith (Hadouken! song) =

Single by Hadouken!

from the album Not Here to Please You
- A-side: "Leap of Faith"
- B-side: "Love, Sweat and Beer"; "Girls"
- Released: 18 November 2007
- Recorded: 2007
- Genre: Grime, rock
- Length: 3:34
- Label: Atlantic
- Songwriter(s): Hadouken!
- Producer(s): Bobby Harlow

Hadouken! singles chronology
"Bounce" (2007)	"Leap of Faith" (2007)	"Love, Sweat and Beer" (2008)

"Leap of Faith" is the third single by British band Hadouken!, the single was released on the bands mixtape Not Here to Please You, the single itself was digitally released on 18 November 2007.

== Background ==
The track is described by the band's official Bebo website as:

the nearest they’ve come yet to balls-out rock & roll, the menacing hoody adolescent offspring of Nine Inch Nails and Muse.
-Hadouken!

The track was released on 12 November on the EP titled Not Here to Please You, and then released as a digital single on 18 November 2007. It peaked at number 97 on iTunes. It is also the only single by Hadouken! to be left out of their debut album, Music for an Accelerated Culture, because it does not match the style of other songs on the album, and was written as an experiment.

The song is about Teenage pregnancy and Gang violence.

"Leap of Faith" is the theme song for BBC Two show Sound, on the fourth episode Hadouken! were featured on the show playing the single live.

The full version of the song was only available on MySpace and the "Love, Sweat and Beer EP". All other releases contain the radio edit of the song.

== Track listing ==
- 7digital
1. "Leap of Faith" (radio edit) - 3:16
2. "Leap of Faith" (Shoes remix) - 3.59
3. "Leap of Faith" (Chase & Status dub) - 6:19
4. "Leap of Faith" (Chase & Status vocal) - 6:21

== Music video ==
The music video was released on 8 October 2007, and was made exclusive to BBC Radio 1's DJ Zane Lowe.

The video was filmed at Grey Court School and begins with the band going towards the basketball court, with a montage of images from the area, the band then set their musical instruments up, and play. As the video progresses more and more special effects are used showing luminous fire and purple cables. The video was directed and created by Bobby Harlow and Stitch That, who also created the videos for Liquid Lives and "That Boy That Girl".
