= Turn the Lights Out (song) =

Single by Hadouken!

from the album For the Masses
- Released: 20 December 2009
- Recorded: 2009
- Genre: Grindie
- Label: Atlantic
- Producer: Noisia

Hadouken! singles chronology
"M.A.D." (2009)	"Turn the Lights Out" (2009)	"Mic Check" (2010)

Music video
- "Turn the Lights Out" on YouTube

"Turn the Lights Out" is a single by British Grindie band Hadouken! from their second album, For the Masses. It was released digitally on 20 December 2009, peaking at No. 2 on the UK Electronic Music Chart.

== Music video ==
The promotional video for the song shows the band playing in a living room that looks to have been badly scorched and burned. A long haired, unshaven man covered in dirt breaks through the floorboards and picks up a Gramophone record and plays it on a turntable. A gathering of dancing people then appear around the band, and the aforementioned man begins to trash the room. As the video ends the man sits down in his armchair and the record stops playing.

== Track listing ==
=== Digital download ===
1. "Turn the Lights Out" (Album Version) – 3:53
2. "Turn the Lights Out" (SPOR Remix) – 5:10
3. "Turn the Lights Out" (JFB Remix) – 4:37

== Charts ==
Chart	Peak position
UK Singles Chart	153
