= Levitate (Hadouken! song) =

Single by Hadouken!

from the album Every Weekend
- Released: 20 January 2013
- Genre: Electro house
- Length: 4:45
- Label: Surface Noise
- Songwriters: James Smith; Alex Smith; Nicholas Hill; Gavin Harris
- Producers: Loadstar; Nightwatch (additional)

Hadouken! singles chronology
"Daylight" (2012)	"Levitate" (2013)

"Levitate" is a song by the British band Hadouken! It was released on 20 January 2013 as the fifth single from their third studio album Every Weekend (2013). It was produced by British duo Loadstar and Dutch bass music trio Noisia (under their Nightwatch alias). The song was made popular by the band's People Are Awesome 2013 viral video that has accumulated over 120 million YouTube views.

== Track listing ==
Digital download - single
No.	Title	Length
1.	"Levitate"	4:45

Digital download - EP
No.	Title	Length
1.	"Levitate"	4:45
2.	"Levitate" (Radio Edit)	3:27
3.	"Levitate" (Alex Light Remix)	4:24
4.	"Levitate" (Koven Remix)	5:01
5.	"Levitate" (Swindle Remix)	4:44

== Chart performance ==
=== Weekly charts ===
Weekly chart performance
Chart (2013–14)	Peak position
Czech Republic Airplay (ČNS IFPI)	74
UK Dance (Official Charts)	17
UK Indie (Official Charts)	8
UK Singles (Official Charts)	87
US Billboard Hot 100	69
US Hot Dance/Electronic Songs (Billboard)	9

=== Year-end charts ===
Annual chart rankings
Chart (2013)	Position
US Hot Dance/Electronic Songs (Billboard)	20
US Streaming Songs (Billboard)	57

== Release history ==
Region	Date	Format	Label
Worldwide	20 January 2013	Digital download	Surface Noise Recordings
