= Xample =

British drum and bass producer and DJ

- Born: Gavin Harris
- Origin: Bristol, England
- Genres: Drum and bass
- Years active: 2003–present
- Label: Ram Records
- Website: www.myspace.com/xamplebeats

Gavin Harris, better known as Xample, is a British drum and bass producer and DJ, who originates from Bristol, England. He has been releasing records since 2003.

In June 2007, he scored a number one on the UK Dance Singles Chart with his track "Lowdown".

From 2010 to 2020, he worked with fellow producer Lomax, under the collective name Loadstar. However, as of 23 May 2020, the duo are no longer actively producing together, as confirmed by RAM Records on a livestream. Xample is currently working under his house alias Eli Brown, whereas Lomax is working on Dawn Wall.

== Discography ==
- "Sonic Sleaze" / "Limiter" (2003), Hardleaders
- "Floor 2 Floor" / "Influence" (2004), Incident
- "Jive" / "In Session" (2004), New Skool Blazers
- "Realise This" / "Nightmoves" (2004), Diverse Products
- "Ten Years of Flex: Version 3.0" (2005), Flex Records
- "Down Beat" / "Sister" (2006), Frequency
- "Sound Clash" / "Mutants" (2006), Frequency
- "Get Out Clause" / "Infamous" (2007), RAM Records
- "Lowdown / The Latter" (2007), RAM Records
- "Contra" / "Keep Their Heads Ringing" (2008), RAM Records
