= The Whip (band) =

English rock band

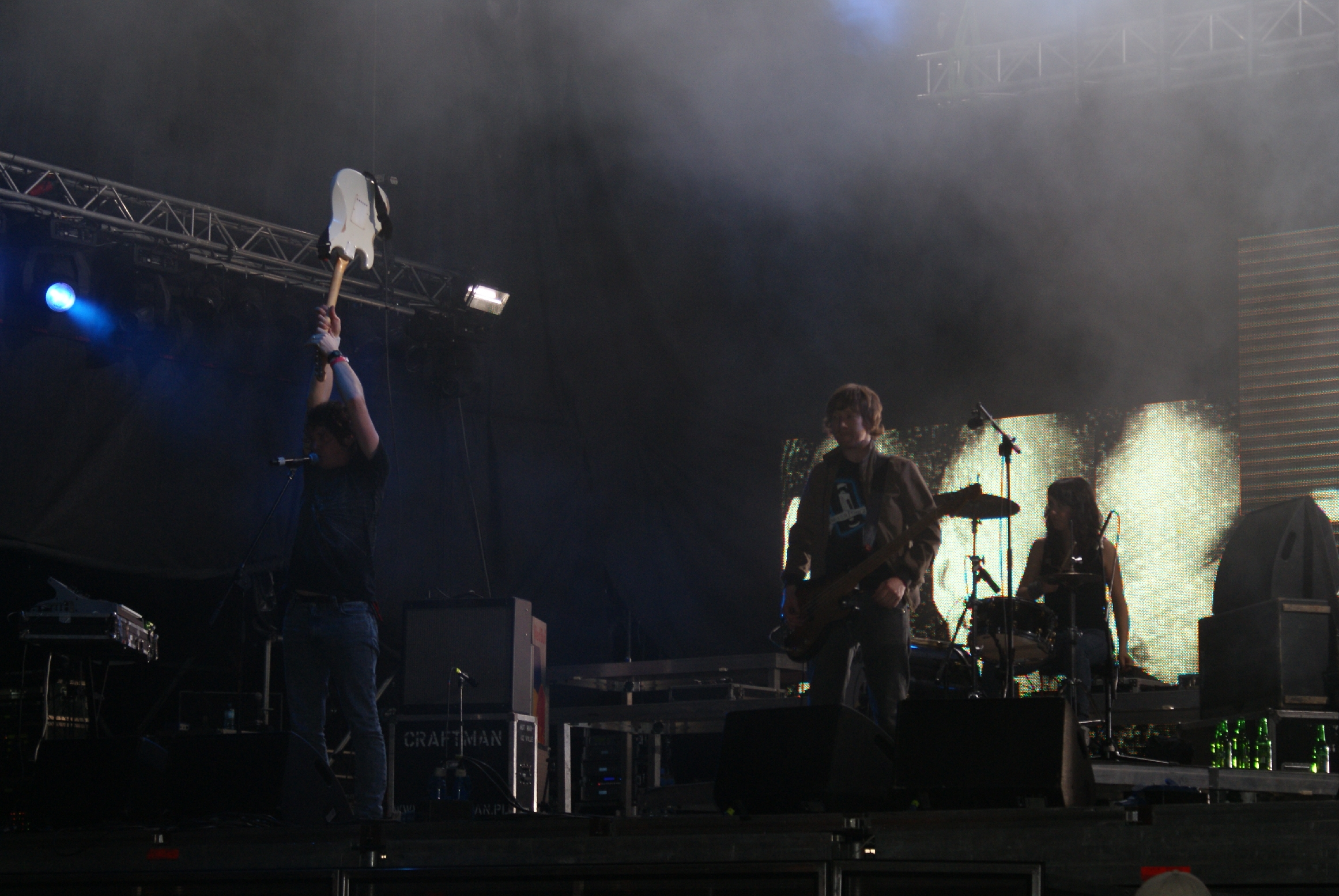
- Audioriver Festival 2009 in Poland

Background information
- Origin: Manchester, England
- Genres: Rock, dance-rock
- Years active: 2006–present
- Labels: Southern Fried Records, Kitsuné, Razor & Tie
- Members: Bruce Carter; Fiona "Lil Fee" Daniel; Nathan Sudders; Alex Carter
- Past members: Danny Saville

The Whip are an English rock band from Manchester, England. The two founding members, Bruce Carter and Danny Saville, previously played in the band Nylon Pylon, who were signed to London Records and supported The Music on their 2003 Tour. Other members of The Whip are Nathan Sudders (bass), who also plays in Manchester band Tokolosh and Fiona "Li'l Fee" Daniel (drums), who was previously in Colne based band Earl.

== Band history ==
The Whip debuted in 2006 with the single Frustration, a limited edition 7" issued by the British label Kids. They subsequently released several singles on record labels such as Kitsuné, before their debut album X Marks Destination emerged on 24 March 2008 on Southern Fried Records. The album was produced by Jim Abbiss, best known for his work with Björk, Kasabian and the Arctic Monkeys.

Tracks "Trash" and "Divebomb" featured on the Kitsune Maison Compilations 3 and 4 respectively, whilst "Muzzle #1", appears in the soundtrack for FIFA 09, the video game by EA Sports. But it is "Trash" that has given the band its widest exposure to date, having been used in a national TV advertising campaign for Coors Light Beer, which debuted in 2009. "Trash" is also the theme tune of clips show Rude Tube.

Band members have also been commissioned to do remixes for bands such as Editors, Hadouken! and The Courteeners, on their track "Fallowfield Hillbilly".

Following the release of their debut album founding member and keyboard player Danny Saville left the band to become Account Manager at GV Multi-Media.

Wired Together, the band's second studio album, was released on 26 September 2011 to mixed reviews.

== Discography ==
=== Albums ===
- X Marks Destination, 2008, Southern Fried Records (No. 75 UK)
- Remix Marks Destination, 2008, Southern Fried Records
- Wired Together, 2011, Southern Fried Records

=== Singles and EPs ===
- "Frustration" (2006, Kids)
- "Trash" (2006, Lavolta Records)
- "Divebomb" (2007, Kitsuné)
- "Muzzle #1" (2007, Southern Fried Records)
- "Sister Siam" (2007, Southern Fried Records)
- "Blackout" (2008, Southern Fried Records)
- "Trash" (2008, Southern Fried Records)
- "Secret Weapon" (2011, Southern Fried Records)
- "Movement" (2011, Southern Fried Records)
- "Riot" EP (2012, Southern Fried Records)

=== Remixes ===
2007

- Editors – "An End Has a Start"
- The Black Ghosts – "Anyway You Choose to Give It"
- Sons and Daughters – "Killer"
- Paul Hartnoll Feat. Robert Smith – "Please"
- Asobi Seksu – "Strawberries"

2008

- Hadouken! – "Declaration of War"

== Use of tracks ==
- "Trash" appeared on ITV's FA Cup "All men are equal" adverts.
- "Trash" appeared on TV advertisements for Coors Light Beer in the UK.
- "Trash" was used in the American sitcom Secret Girlfriend during a striptease scene.
- "Trash" was used as the backing track for Channel 4's series Rude Tube during the opening scenes.
- "Trash" was featured in the music podcast Chuck G's New Music Podcast (18 February 2009) on iTunes
- "Trash" was used in various promotional videos for the Microsoft Zune HD as well as a video that plays at first launch of the Zune desktop software.
- "Trash" was used in the Evolution Studios MotorStorm: Pacific Rift soundtrack.
- "Trash" was used in the Midnight Club: Los Angeles soundtrack on the Xbox 360 and PlayStation 3.
- "Trash" appears on Turn 10's Forza Motorsport 3 soundtrack for Xbox 360.
- "Blackout" was featured in EA Sports' NBA Live 2009
- "Blackout" appeared throughout the first season of the Dave programme Batteries Not Included.
- "Blackout" featured in a promo video and the introductory video played on first boot of the Microsoft Zune HD.
- "Muzzle #1" was used in the video game EA Sports FIFA 09.
- "Divebomb" was used in the video game The Sims 2.
- "Fire" was featured in Electronic Arts' Need for Speed: Undercover soundtrack.
