= Lowdown / The Latter =

Single by Xample
- Released: 28 April 2007
- Genre: Drum and bass
- Label: RAM Records
- Songwriter(s): Gavin Harris
- Producer(s): Xample

Xample singles chronology
"Get Out Clause / Infamous" (2007)	"Lowdown / The Latter" (2007)	"The Experiment / Breathe & Stop" (2008)

"Lowdown / The Latter" is the ninth single released by drum and bass record producer Xample. "Lowdown" reached number one on the UK Dance Singles Chart.

== Track listing ==
No.	Title	Length
1.	"Lowdown"	5:21
2.	"The Latter" (featuring Lomax)	5:21

== Chart performance ==
=== Weekly charts ===
Chart (2007)	Peak position
UK Physical Singles (OCC)	67
UK Dance (OCC)	1
UK Indie (OCC)	11
