= Trash Fashion =

English New Rave band

- Origin: Birmingham, England
- Genres: New rave
- Years active: 2005-present
- Labels: Propaganda (UK); Vinyl Junkie (Japan)
- Members: Tom Marsh ("Jet Storm"); Ben Marsh ("Mason Storm"); Matt Emerson ("Bam Bam"); Jim Ready ("Jimbo Ready")
- Past members: K-Bomb
- Website: Official Website; Myspace page

Trash Fashion are a four-piece band made up of brothers Tom and Ben Marsh (lead vocals and lead guitar, respectively) joined by Matt Emerson (drummer) and Jim Ready (bassist). Their current UK record label is Propaganda Records, and in Japan it is Vinyl Junkie. All members originally hail from Birmingham and are now based in London.

== Members ==
In early 2009, the band replaced their previous stage names (shown in brackets) with their real-life first names on their MySpace.

- Tom Marsh ("Jet Storm") — vocals, keyboards
- Ben Marsh ("Mason Storm") — guitar, keyboards, vocals
- Matt Emerson ("Bam Bam") — drums
- Jim Ready ("Jimbo Ready") — bass, vocals

=== Former members ===
- K-Bomb — bass, vocals left the band in May 2008 to pursue his solo project, Kurran and the Wolfnotes .

== Musical style ==
Trash Fashion describe their sound as "Guntronic Disco Warehouse Rock" but are often placed in the New Rave category, citing Black Strobe, Tiga, Daft Punk, Altern8, The Prodigy, Shalamar, Prince, Stevie Wonder, and Iron Maiden as some of their influences.

Trash Fashion also cover songs from established bands, such as Madness and Hall & Oates.

== Discography ==
=== Albums ===
- Nights of Error (album) (Released 20-10-2008), Propaganda Records
1. Beat Goes Round
2. Why Can't We Be Friends
3. We Go To War
4. Spread the Love
5. Night of Error
6. Rabbit in the Headlights
7. Mom and Daddy
8. Rave Dave
9. I Got Slimed
10. Tight Body
11. Uphill Struggle
12. What Am I Supposed To Do
- Eat our Skill (Japan only mini-album) (Released 4-6-2008), Vinyl Junkie

=== EPs ===
- I can't go for that (Released 2009)
- Why Can't We Be Friends? (Released 10-3-2008)
- Mom & Daddy (2007)

=== Singles ===
Year	Title	Album
2007	"Its a Rave Dave"	Nights Of Error
2008	"Beat Goes Round"	Nights Of Error
2008	"Night Of Error"	Nights Of Error
