= Oxygen (Hadouken! song) =

Single by Hadouken!

from the album Every Weekend
- Released: 7 November 2010 (Single); 18 January 2011 (EP)
- Recorded: 2010
- Genre: Electronica, new rave
- Length: 3:03
- Label: EMI
- Songwriters: James Smith, Alice Spooner, Daniel "Pilau" Rice, Christopher Purcell, Nick Rice,
- Producer: Loadstar

Hadouken! singles chronology
"Mecha Love" (2010)	"Oxygen" (2010)	"Parasite" (2012)

Music video
- "Oxygen" on YouTube

"Oxygen" is a song by British new rave band Hadouken!. It was released as the second single from their third studio album Every Weekend on 7 November 2010. The EP was released later on 18 January 2011.

== Background ==
"Oxygen" is the second of two songs (the other being "Mecha Love") that the band had confirmed to be released as singles in 2010, before the rest of their third album is recorded in January 2011.

The song was mistakenly released on Beatport on the same date as "Mecha Love", several weeks before the announced release date. To compensate for this, the official release date was pushed back into December and the release was extended into an EP.

== Music video ==
The music video was first published through Hadouken!'s YouTube channel on 8 January 2011. It features scenes of a woman in a bath tub attached to wires while the band is performing the song. An alternate video for the song was also released on 27 January.

== Track listing ==
Digital download - single
No.	Title	Length
1.	"Oxygen" (Radio Edit)	3:03
2.	"Oxygen"	4:27

Digital download - EP
No.	Title	Length
1.	"Oxygen"	4:27
2.	"Mecha Love"	4:48
3.	"Oxygen" (Gemini Remix)	4:43
4.	"Oxygen" (Alix Perez Remix)	5:13
5.	"Oxygen" (Slugz & Joe London Remix)	6:04
6.	"Mecha Love" (Nova Remix)	6:41

== Chart positions ==
Chart (2011)	Peak position
UK Dance (OCC)	27
