= Music for an Accelerated Culture =

Studio album by Hadouken!
- Released: 24 April 2008
- Recorded: 2007–2008
- Genre: Grindie, new rave, indie rock
- Length: 37:06
- Label: Atlantic
- Producer: Jacknife Lee, Rich Costey, James Smith

Hadouken! chronology
Not Here to Please You (2007)	Music for an Accelerated Culture (2008)	M.A.D. EP (2009)

Singles from Music for an Accelerated Culture
- 1. "That Boy That Girl" Released: 28 February 2007; 2. "Liquid Lives" Released: 25 June 2007; 3. "Get Smashed Gate Crash" Released: 17 March 2008; 4. "Declaration of War" Released: 4 May 2008; 5. "Crank It Up" Released: 7 July 2008

Professional ratings
Review scores
Source	Rating
AllMusic	2.5/5 stars
Gigwise	4.5/5 stars
NME	3/5 stars
Subba Cultcha	4.5/5 stars

Music for an Accelerated Culture is the debut album from new rave/grindie band Hadouken!, released as an Aerials exclusive on 24 April 2008 and as a physical copy on 5 May 2008. The album contains nine songs, three of which ("Spend Your Life", "What She Did" and "Declaration of War") had been previously played on tour. The album includes two older Hadouken! songs, Liquid Lives and That Boy That Girl.

== History ==
Live versions of "What She Did" and "Declaration of War" were made available for a limited time on the Atlantic Records YouTube channel.

The first track, "Get Smashed Gate Crash" was added to the bands' MySpace in February 2008.

A clip of "Declaration of War" became available on the internet on 25 March 2008. It was later announced that the song would be a single, and that the video would begin screening at several locations around the country in an unconventional method:

- 28 March 2008 - The Fields Church, Trafalgar Square, London
- 29 March 2008 - Leeds Cockpit
- 30 March 2008 - Manchester MEN Arena
- 31 March 2008 - Glasgow ABC2

A further fake copy surfaced two weeks before the release of the album which used 30 second previews of the songs on a loop. The band responded to this stating: "Some moronic blog writers have downloaded this version, failed to spot it's not actually the album and written reviews of it saying that all the songs are really repetitive. Errr megalolzeleven at them. Please buy your own copy and make up your own mind as to whether it's any cop or look out for genuine reviews in all the usual magazines in the next few weeks.".

On 16 May 2008, it was announced that "Crank It Up" would be the fifth single from the album.

The album was released in America on 28 October 2008.

== Track listing ==
No.	Title	Length
1.	"Get Smashed Gate Crash"	3:21
2.	"That Boy That Girl"	3:32
3.	"Game Over"	3:35
4.	"Declaration of War"	3:11
5.	"Mister Misfortune"	3:17
6.	"Crank It Up"	3:00
7.	"What She Did"	3:18
8.	"Driving Nowhere"	3:48
9.	"Liquid Lives"	2:51
10.	"Spend Your Life"	3:13
11.	"Wait for You"	4:00

=== Japan Bonus Tracks ===
No.	Title	Length
1.	"Leap of Faith"	3:22
2.	"Declaration of War" (Hadouken! vs. Kissy Sell Out Remix)	3:32
