= M.A.D. EP =

EP by Hadouken!
- Released: 14 September 2009
- Genre: New rave, grindie
- Label: Surface Noise

Hadouken! chronology
| Music for an Accelerated Culture (2008) | M.A.D. EP (2009) | For the Masses (2010) |

The M.A.D. EP is a 2009 EP by new rave band Hadouken!. It was released on 14 September 2009. It was released in the UK as a digital download EP, however, a CD single is available in Japan. M.A.D. stands for Mutually Assured Destruction. The title track later appeared on the band's second studio album, For the Masses.

== Track listing ==
1. "M.A.D." - 3:26
2. "Something Very Bad" - 3:04
3. "Ugly (Dub Mix)" - 4:08
4. "M.A.D. (Detboi Remix)" - 4:32
5. "M.A.D. (Plastician Remix)" - 4:10
6. "M.A.D. (Phace Remix)" - 6:19

== Music video ==
The music video for the Hadouken! song M.A.D. shows a man dressed in a mouse outfit, who appears to be a public menace. He intentionally trips an elderly woman and harasses two women on the street. The mouse then walks into a shop where he tries to buy a bottle of alcoholic cider from the shopkeeper, but the shopkeeper refuses to sell alcohol to him, leading to an argument that causes the mouse to beat him up. The mouse drinks the cider and starts to feel bad about his actions. Finally a cat, who is a man dressed in a cat outfit being a public hero, chases and wins a fight against the mouse, presumably killing him with a brick as the music video ends.

The music video was directed by Martyn Thomas with Tim Mo'Gridge as director of photography & produced by Marie Claire Denyer. George Herse portrayed the mouse, and Tom Harris portrayed the cat.
