= Every Weekend =

Studio album by Hadouken!
- Released: 18 March 2013
- Recorded: 2011−2013
- Genre: Dubstep; electro house; drum and bass
- Length: 43:59
- Label: Surface Noise Records
- Producer: Loadstar; Drumsound & Bassline Smith; Aeph; Nightwatch

Hadouken! chronology
For The Masses (2010)	Every Weekend (2013)

Singles from Every Weekend
- 1. "Mecha Love" Released: 18 October 2010; 2. "Oxygen" Released: 7 November 2010; 3. "Parasite" Released: 2 April 2012; 4. "Bad Signal" Released: 19 August 2012; 5. "Levitate" Released: 20 January 2013

Professional ratings
Review scores
Source	Rating
NME	7/10 stars
Supajam	5/10 stars
Shieldsgazette	3/10 stars
The Yorker	unfavourable

Every Weekend is the third and final studio album by British electronic band Hadouken!. The album was initially set for release on 18 February 2013, but was released on 18 March 2013 via Surface Noise Records.

== Track listing ==
No.	Title	Writer(s)	Producer(s)	Length
1.	"The Vortex"	James Smith; Jonas Ullmann; Michael Wojcicki	Blokhead	4:00
2.	"Levitate"	J. Smith; Nicholas Hill; Gavin Harris; Alex Smith; Martijn van Sonderen; Nik Roos; Thijs de Vlieger	Loadstar; Nightwatch^{[a]}	4:45
3.	"Bliss Out"	J. Smith; Van Sonderen; Roos; De Vlieger	Nightwatch	3:23
4.	"As One"	J. Smith; Hill; Harris; Joel Pott; Kevin Willow	Loadstar; Kev Willow^{[b]}	4:32
5.	"Parasite"	J. Smith; Hill; Harris	Loadstar	4:33
6.	"Bad Signal"	J. Smith; Simone Vallecorsa; Conrad Shafie; Lamont Dozier; Brian Holland; Eddie Holland	Aeph; Blame^{[b]}	3:56
7.	"Stop Time"	J. Smith; Hill; Harris; Pott	Loadstar	4:08
8.	"Spill Your Guts"	J. Smith; Vallecorsa	Aeph	4:04
9.	"The Comedown"	J. Smith; Hill; Harris; Pott	Loadstar	4:26
10.	"Daylight" (Drumsound & Bassline Smith featuring Hadouken!)	Andy Wright; Simon Smith; J. Smith	Drumsound & Bassline Smith	2:59

Bonus tracks
No.	Title	Writer(s)	Producer(s)	Length
11.	"Mecha Love"	J. Smith; Hill; Harris	Loadstar	4:25
12.	"Oxygen"	J. Smith; Hill; Harris	Loadstar	4:48

Japanese bonus track
No.	Title	Length
13.	"Vessel"	3:15

Notes

- Track listing and credits from album booklet.
- ^{^a} signifies a co-producer
- ^{^b} signifies an additional producer
- "Bad Signal" features uncredited vocals from Yolanda Quartey.

Sample credits

- "Bad Signal" contains interpolations of "You Keep Me Hangin' On", written and performed by Holland–Dozier–Holland.

== Personnel ==
Hadouken!

- James Smith
- Alice Spooner
- Daniel Rice
- Christopher Purcell
- Nick Rice

Technical personnel

- Aeph – production
- Blame - additional production
- Drumsound & Bassline Smith – production
- Greg "Wizard" Fleming - vocal mixing
- Henry "Hal" Ritson - additional recording
- James K. Stanford - additional recording
- Joel Pott - writer
- Kev Willow - additional production
- Loadstar – production
- Nightwatch – production
- Sarah Decourcy - vocal production and recording
- Stuart Hawkes - mastering
- Wez Clarke - mixing
- Yolanda Quartey - backing vocals
