= Mic Check (Hadouken! song) =

Single by Hadouken!

from the album For the Masses
- Released: 12 April 2010
- Songwriters: James Smith, Alice Spooner, Daniel "Pilau" Rice, Christopher Purcell, Nick Rice, Nik Roos, Martijn van Sonderen and Thijs de Vlieger
- Producer: Noisia

Hadouken! singles chronology
"Turn the Lights Out" (2010)	"Mic Check" (2010)	"House Is Falling" (2010)

Music video
- "Mic Check" on YouTube

"Mic Check" is the third single by British grindie band Hadouken!, released from their second studio album, For the Masses.

== Background ==
The song was originally going to contain a sample from Double 99's "RipGroove", however due to clearance issues, the sample was removed to prevent delays in the release of the album. When the sample was cleared for use, "Mic Check" was announced as a single. There are three versions of the song; the album version, the radio edit, which is exactly the same as the album version but with the sample reinstated, and a remix which contains the sample and is a heavier, dancier version of the song.

== Track listing ==
=== Digital download ===
1. "Mic Check" (Radio Edit) - 3:28

=== iTunes EP ===
1. "Mic Check" (Camo & Krooked Remix) - 5:06
2. "Mic Check" (L.A.L.M Edition) - 5:52
3. "Mic Check" (Stupid Fresh Remix) - 5:40

== Chart performance ==
Following strong radio airplay throughout March and April 2010, "Mic Check" debuted on the UK Dance Chart at No. 14, before climbing to No. 13 the following week. Upon release, the single climbed a further 5 places to peak at No. 8.

Chart (2010)	Peak Position
UK Singles Chart	85
UK Dance Chart	8
