= For the Masses (Hadouken! album) =

Studio album by Hadouken!
- Released: 25 January 2010
- Recorded: Summer 2009 at Groningen, The Netherlands
- Length: 43:56
- Label: Surface Noise
- Producer: Noisia

Hadouken! chronology
M.A.D. EP (2009)	For the Masses (2010)	Every Weekend (2013)

Singles from For The Masses
- 1. "M.A.D." Released: 14 September 2009; 2. "Turn the Lights Out" Released: 20 December 2009; 3. "Mic Check" Released: 12 April 2010; 4. "House is Falling" Released: 28 June 2010

For the Masses is the second studio album by British grindie band Hadouken!. It was recorded in Groningen, The Netherlands during the Summer of 2009, and preceded by the release of the M.A.D. EP.

== Track listing ==
All songs written by Hadouken! and Noisia

No.	Title	Length
1.	"Rebirth"	4:30
2.	"Turn the Lights Out"	3:53
3.	"M.A.D."	3:26
4.	"Evil"	3:56
5.	"House is Falling"	4:10
6.	"Mic Check"	3:26
7.	"Ugly"	4:05
8.	"Bombshock"	3:54
9.	"Play the Night"	4:13
10.	"Lost"	4:16
11.	"Retaliate" (iTunes Bonus Track)	4:07

- "Ugly" was featured as a dub mix on the M.A.D. EP.

== Release ==
The album was released on 25 January 2010. Fans who pre-ordered the album through the official website received a signed copy a few days early, with their name included on a mini poster inside the case.

== Reception ==
Professional ratings
Aggregate scores
Source	Rating
Metacritic	43/100
Review scores
Source	Rating
Drowned in Sound	(3/10)
The Music Fix	(4/10)
MusicOMH	1.5/5 stars
NME	(3/10)
Sputnikmusic	2/5
True to Sound	(3/10)

According to the review aggregator Metacritic, For the Masses received "mixed or average reviews" based on a weighted average score of 43 out of 100 from six critic scores. Drowned in Sound stated that "This aggressive tone... breaks new boundaries in something absolutely ridiculous", whilst NME feels "James Smith is in the throes of an aneurysm. By the end of For the Masses you might well be wishing one on yourself just for sweet relief." Both reviewers gave the album 3 out of 10 stars. One notable exception to this negative trend was Q, whose reviewer called the album "addictive, energizing, and catchy as hell."

== Hadouken! ==
- James Smith - vocals, programming
- Daniel "Pilau" Rice - guitar, synthesizer
- Christopher Purcell - bass, synthesizer, samples
- Alice Spooner - synthesizer
- Nick Rice - drums, programming

== Charts ==
Chart performance for For the Masses
Chart (2010)	Peak position
Scottish Albums (Official Charts)	33
UK Albums (Official Charts)	19
