= Dance-punk =

Post-punk subgenre that emerged in the late 1970s

- Other names: Disco-punk (early), punk-funk (early)
- Stylistic origins: Avant-funk; punk rock; post-punk; disco; new wave; post-disco
- Cultural origins: Late 1970s, United States (Los Angeles, New York City, San Francisco) and England (Leeds)
- Derivative forms: Punk funk; wonky pop; sass

Other topics
- Alternative dance; dance-rock; electropunk; funk rock; funk metal

Dance-punk is a subgenre of post-punk that emerged in the late 1970s, and is closely associated with the disco, post-disco and new wave movements. The genre, which began originally as disco-punk or punk funk, is characterized by the incorporation of the angularity and syncopation of funk and the upbeat, danceable rhythms of disco into post-punk, art punk and more general punk rock. Its development is closely related to avant-funk, originally known as mutant disco. It was most prominent in punk in New York City, overlapping into the no wave movement.

== History ==
Many groups in the post-punk era adopted a more danceable style, with dance-punk emerging as a compromised genre originally referred to as "disco-punk" or "punk funk". Its first wave emerged from a communal and alternative scene as a critique of social standards. New York City bands who were core to this wave were ESG, Liquid Liquid, James Chance and the Contortions, Cristina Monet, Bush Tetras, Defunkt, Lizzy Mercier Descloux and Material. In addition, the Slits contributed to the genre in Britain, emphasizing the influence of reggae. These bands were influenced strongly by funk, avant-funk trends, disco, dub reggae, ska, new wave, and other dance music forms popular at the time.

More culturally prominent acts from the late 1970s into the 1980s included Talking Heads, Public Image Ltd., New Order and Gang of Four. Emerging from the convergence of disco and punk influences, dance-punk exhibits a strong affiliation with urban environments, particularly in the way they are romanticized and portrayed. These spaces, whether they exist in the realm of imagination or reality, conjure up a sense of cosmopolitanism, artistic liberation, and a spirit of defiance against the confines of conventional mainstream culture.

== Characteristics ==
The dance-punk genre, spanning both its first and second waves, varies rather than being a plain stylistic fusion of dance music and punk rock. As a subgenre emerging from the broader post-punk movement, dance-punk shares several common features. These features include "dour (male) vocals with erudite or self-conscious lyrics, accompanied by metallic-sounding, distorted electric guitars playing texturally, not melodically; an accelerated disco beat or dance groove; a melodic bass line; and echoing sound effects borrowed from dub-reggae."

One of the most notable features of dance-punk is a deliberate emphasis on the effective use of space and silence. This approach involves creating minimalist rhythms, and avoiding extended guitar solos. Within dance punk, minimalism signifies directness and systematic order, often drawing parallels with the purity associated with the clean lines and abstractions of modernist art. The guitar sound in dance punk takes on a unique quality characterized by angularity, having a clean and brittle quality that departs from traditional riffing or bluesy chords. This sonic approach aligns the guitar sound with abstract shapes and architectural elements reminiscent of Constructivism, Suprematism and the Bauhaus movement.

Prominent groove and syncopation are integral to the rhythm of dance punk. The genre strives to create a groove that is fluid, smooth and trance-like, offering an escape from the metrical constraints of capitalism. The groove, with its syncopations, introduces elements of human flexibility and unpredictability, giving the music an affective dimension that is felt rather than intellectually grasped. Syncopation, a key component, involves shifting and eliminating predictable accents, aligning rhythms more with speech and orality, emphasizing the human element over mechanistic precision. The lyrical aspect of dance punk sets it apart from many other dance genres, often adhering to verse-chorus or narrative structures more common in rock music. At its most dance-influenced, however, dance-punk acts use repetitive phrases, derived from hooks in disco where the repetition of phrases serves to empty language and open the self to divine inspiration through heightened emotional expression, especially on the dancefloor.

== Dance style ==
In the 70s, when dance punk emerged, punk bands tried to rebel against society. In the punk scene, rebellion was often expressed through violent dance styles such as thrashing, characterized by head bobbing, flailing arms and exaggeratedly aggressive and energetic movements, and pogo dancing, characterized by jumping in a crowd by throwing oneself against other people. Punk dancing was an amalgamation of these two styles.

== Dance-punk revival ==
Although dance-punk faded with the rise of new pop in the early 1980s, it made a comeback in the late 1990s and early 2000s as part of the post-punk revival. Dance-punk bands emerged from the pop-punk and garage rock revivals of the late 1990s. New York acts such as LCD Soundsystem, Liars, and the Rapture would be described as "Brooklyn dance-punk". Other notable acts included Clinic, Death from Above 1979, !!!, Hockey, Franz Ferdinand, Hot Hot Heat, Foals, Yeah Yeah Yeahs, Le Tigre, Bloc Party, Kasabian, You Say Party, Electric Six, the Faint, Shout Out Out Out Out, and Radio 4, joined by dance-oriented acts who adopted rock sounds such as Out Hud.

In the early 2000s Washington, D.C. had a popular and notable punk-funk scene, inspired by Fugazi, post-punk, and go-go acts like Trouble Funk and Rare Essence, including bands like Q and Not U, Black Eyes, and Baltimore's Oxes, Double Dagger, and Dope Body. In Britain the combination of indie with dance-punk was dubbed new rave in publicity for Klaxons and the term was picked up and applied by the NME to bands including Trash Fashion, New Young Pony Club, Hadouken!, Late of the Pier, Test Icicles, and Shitdisco forming a scene with a similar visual aesthetic to earlier raves.

== See also ==
- List of dance-punk artists
- Electropunk
- Electronic rock

== Bibliography ==
- Reynolds, Simon. "Mutant Disco and Punk-Funk: Crosstown Traffic in Early Eighties New York (and Beyond ...)." Rip It Up and Start Again: Post-punk 1978–84. London: Faber and Faber, Ltd., 2005.
