= Bolt Action Five =

English dance-punk/industrial band

- Origin: London, England
- Genres: Industrial pop; dance-punk; new rave; post-hardcore
- Years active: 2006–2008
- Labels: Unsigned, singles released on No Pain in Pop (UK); So Sweet (US/Japan)
- Members: Tobias J Hughes; Ian William Galloway; D Carnivore; Mark Murphy
- Website: Official Website

Bolt Action Five were a dance-punk/industrial band from London, England, composed of Tobias J Hughes, Ian William Galloway, D Carnivore and Mark Murphy. They formed in early 2006 from a variety of different members and appeared repeatedly in Artrocker and PlayMusic magazines, as well as in NME, i-D, Disorder Magazine and various online music journals.

The band seemed to have difficulty describing their sound, variously categorising themselves as indie rock, electro, industrial pop, dance-punk, or electro-metal. In interviews they listed Devo, Nine Inch Nails, Wire, Prince and Michael Jackson as influences.

The band split on 26 March 2008.

== Members ==
- Tobias J Hughes – guitar
- D Carnivore – vocals
- Ian William Galloway – bass, keyboards, samplers, drum machines
- Mark Murphy – keyboards, vocals, drum machines

== Discography ==
=== Releases ===
Release	Format	Date	Label	Notes
"Tree Friend Tree Foe"	Single	March 2007	No Pain in Pop [UK]	UK release – 500 copies on green vinyl
File Under WOLVES	EP	July 2007	So Sweet [US]	US release – 200 copies of a 6-track EP
"Think Fast/Can The Freedom Regulate The Volume?"	Single (A/AA)	October 2007	This Is Fake DIY [UK]	UK release – 500 copies on vinyl + digital download

=== Compilations ===
- "Spring Heeled Jack" – on Playmusic magazine compilation (October 2006)
- "Gurl Howl" – on Artrocker magazine compilation (December 2006)
- "Tree Friend Tree Foe" – on Japanese compilation (October 2007)
- "Can The Freedom (Barringtone Remix)" – on Artrocker magazine compilation (December 2007)

== See also ==
- Dance-punk
- Industrial music
- New Cross

== Sources ==
- Artrocker, "The Friday Review," Issue 48, Page 22
- Artrocker, "Soundcheck," Issue 4, Page 10
- NME, "What's on the NME Stereo?," 30 March 2007
- Zoo, "10 New Tracks," 30 March 2007
- Profile – from The Guardian New Bands
- Review, Stealth, Nottingham – from FRINKmusic
