= Liquid Lives =

Single by Hadouken!

from the album Music for an Accelerated Culture
- B-side: "You Can't Be That"
- Released: 25 June 2007
- Genre: Grime, rock
- Length: 2:48
- Label: Surface Noise/Atlantic
- Songwriter(s): Hadouken!
- Producer(s): Bobby Harlow

Hadouken! singles chronology
"That Boy That Girl" (2007)	"Liquid Lives" (2007)	"Bounce" (2007)

Second Artwork
- 3" CD single set in clear plastic disc

"Liquid Lives" is the second single by British band Hadouken!. The single reached the top 40 in the UK and currently the album's best selling single.

== Background ==
The song deals with the binge drinking habits of the British people, and how it affects different people, like as quoted "a girl who gets date raped". Also mentioned is a man who "fell off his horse and shot himself", and "a drunk driver".

== Music video ==
Like previous single "That Boy That Girl", the video was directed and created by Bobby Harlow, and after the success of "That Boy That Girl", they decided to shoot a more professional video as previously the music video had been shot in a friend's bedroom.

The video works around the band playing in a club like room lite with UV lighting and paints, with "Hadouken!" written all over the walls as well as other art and writing. There are people dancing around the band, whilst covered in UV paint. The cameras are mounted on the band's instruments and equipment as well as some other points of the room.

Band member James in the music video.

== Track listing ==
CD single

1. "Liquid Lives"
2. "Liquid Lives" (Pirate Soundsystem's Headspin Remix)

7"
A: "Liquid Lives"
B: "Liquid Lives" (Aaron La Crate Remix)

Limited edition clear 7"
A: "Liquid Lives"
B: "You Can't Be That"

=== Japan EP ===
1. "Liquid Lives"
2. "That Boy That Girl"
3. "Tuning In"
4. "Liquid Lives" (Noisia Remix)
5. "Tuning In" (H! Re-Rub)
6. "That Boy That Girl" (video)
7. "Liquid Lives" (video)

== Chart performance ==
Chart (2007)	Peak position
UK Singles Chart	36
