= That Boy That Girl =

- 7" Cover

Single by Hadouken!

from the album Music for an Accelerated Culture
- B-side: "Tuning In"
- Released: 28 February 2007
- Genre: Grime, new rave
- Length: 3:39
- Label: Surface Noise/Kitsuné
- Songwriter: Hadouken!
- Producer: Bobby Harlow

Hadouken! singles chronology
"That Boy That Girl" (2007)	"Liquid Lives" (2007)

10" Cover

"That Boy That Girl" is the first single by British band Hadouken!. The first track later re-appeared as the second track on their 2008 debut studio album Music for an Accelerated Culture.

== Background ==
The band are described on the HMV website as:

A collision of grimey beats, razor-sharp lyrical dissection of 2007 nightlife and a whole dollop of flouro-pop sensibility, Hadouken! exploded into 2007 with the release of their Radio One championed 12" 'That Boy That Girl'. Confusing some, tickling most, their kaleidoscopic approach modern pop music is exhilarating. The song was released as a 1000 record limited pressing, with 500 of these being coloured in by the band themselves, which is now somewhat of a collectors item.

== Track listing ==
- 7"

A: "That Boy That Girl" - 3:39
B: "Tuning In" - 3:33

- 10"

A1: "That Boy That Girl" - 3:39
A2: "Tuning In" - 3:33
B1: "Tuning In (H! Re-Rub)" - 5:00

The B-side to the 10" release is mistakenly labelled as "Tuning It (H! Re-Rub)".

== Release ==
The single was originally released as 500 7" records, each one hand coloured and signed by a band member. After these sold out, an additional 500 were printed and sold, but these were left blank. The record was then released as a 10" on Kitsuné Musique.
