= Hadouken! (band) =

British dance-punk band (2006–2014)

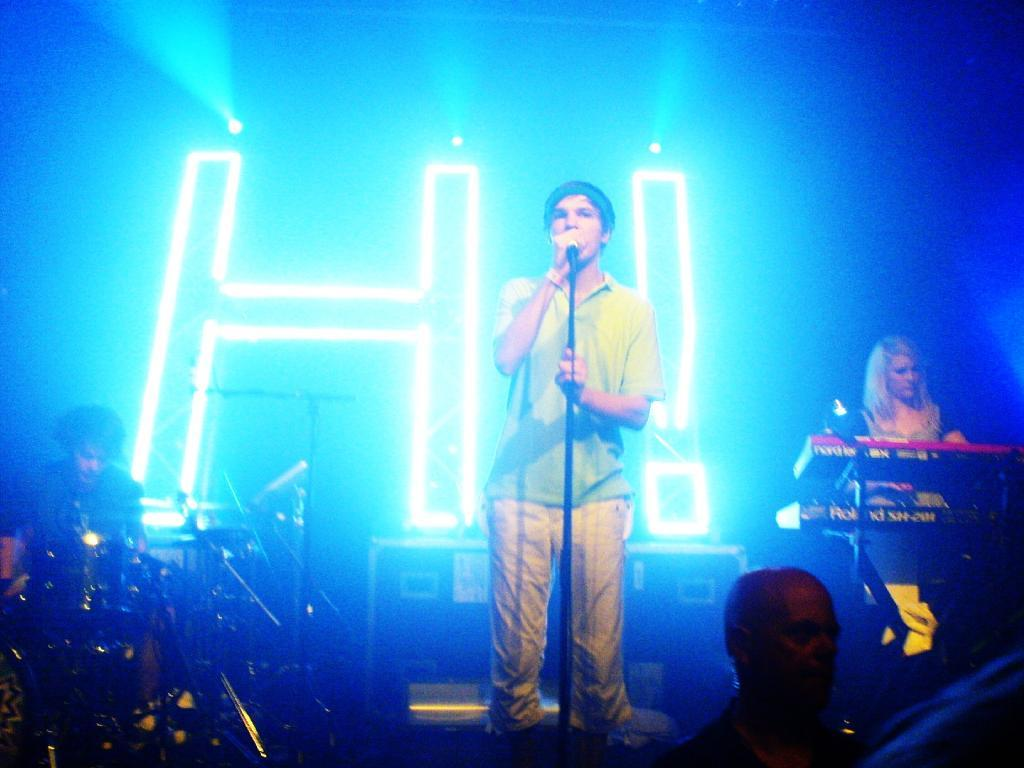
- James Smith from Hadouken! with synth player Alice Spooner and drummer Nick Rice in the background, 2008

Background information
- Origin: London, England, United Kingdom
- Genres: Dance-punk; electro rock; rap rock; nu rave; grime; grindie; indietronica; electro house; dubstep; drum and bass
- Years active: 2006–2014
- Labels: Ministry of Sound; Atlantic; Kitsuné; EMI; Gold Typhoon
- Members: James Smith; Alice Spooner; Daniel "Pilau" Rice; Christopher Purcell; Nick Rice

Hadouken! were a British dance-punk band formed in London in 2006 by singer, songwriter and producer James Smith and synth player Alice Spooner along with guitarist Daniel "Pilau" Rice, bassist Christopher Purcell and drummer Nick Rice. The band took its name from the special attack of the same name from the Street Fighter video game series. It was in Leeds that Hadouken! began their own record label, Surface Noise Records.

== History ==
=== Early years ===
After forming the label, Smith began writing and demoing the first Hadouken! tracks. In February 2007, Hadouken! self-released a two-song limited edition vinyl, a double-a side of "That Boy That Girl" and "Tuning In". The former gained popularity after the video made it to number one in MTV Two's NME Chart.

Hadouken! played their first gig at the Dirty Hearts Club in Southend on 16 September 2006. They played their debut London gig the following week at the notorious Another Music Another Kitchen night at Proud Gallery in Camden. They recorded demos and spent their first six months playing gigs predominantly in Leeds and London. In December 2006, Hadouken! recruited bass player Chris Purcell.

The band first began getting noticed more widely in 2006. It was 2007 though, when success properly came to the band. In January 2007 Mike Skinner of The Streets gave the band one of their first radio plays, he played future single 'That Boy That Girl' on BBC Radio 1 whilst guest presenting Zane Lowe's new music show, describing the band as 'a great new band.' In February 2007 the band released what is said to be an internet phenomenon, described as "a savage, snarling work of genius", by NME. single double a-side "That Boy That Girl/Tuning In" through the band's own label, Surface Noise Records. A video was also made for the track by friend of the band Bobby Harlow, which charted successfully in the MTV Two/NME chart. The latter, "Tuning In" appeared as a remix on Kitsuné Musique's compilation album, Kitsuné Maison Compilation 4, titled "Tuning In [H! Re-rub]". The remix also was used as a b-side on the 10-inch single from Kitsuné Musique, released on 7 May 2007.

Liquid Lives was released as the band's second single release on 25 June 2007. The song received moderate airplay on MTV2, and charted successfully in the NME Chart Show. The band released a new video for the track, as well as an exclusive live video recorded as part of "MTV2 Live". "Liquid Lives" marked Hadouken!'s first move into the UK Singles Chart, reaching No. 36 on 1 July. In June 2007, the band completed a full UK tour supported by Electro/Punk band Does It Offend You, Yeah? and rapper Example.

=== Not Here to Please You and Music for an Accelerated Culture (2007–2008) ===
Hadouken!'s third single, "Leap of Faith", was a digital only release on 12 November 2007. The song was taken from their Not Here to Please You mixtape. The mixtape or EP includes the bands remixes of Bloc Party and Plan B and a new remix of a Bolt Action Five song, as well as some older songs that have been re-recorded. The mixtape was released on 12 November 2007 and was only available in USB format.

Throughout September, October and November 2007 Hadouken! played a UK tour with support from fellow Leeds band Shut Your Eyes and You'll Burst Into Flames as well as Manchester based The Whip, The Ghost Frequency and Late of the Pier. The tour coincided with the release of "Leap of Faith" and their new mixtape Not Here to Please You.

On 7 January 2008, Hadouken! were guest presenters on Zane Lowe's BBC Radio 1 show. On the show Hadouken! referred to previous single 'Leap of Faith' as an experiment and suggested the album would draw more on their dance music influences, comparing it to The Prodigy and The Chemical Brothers.

On 17 February 2008, the band released the first studio recording from their upcoming untitled album, the track titled "Get Smashed Gate Crash" was released on the band's MySpace.

On 3 March 2008, Hadouken! announced the album's title (Music for an Accelerated Culture), as well as details of the promo track for the album; "Get Smashed Gate Crash".

=== For the Masses and The M.A.D. EP (2009–2010) ===
In mid-2009, the band recorded their second studio album, For the Masses, in the Netherlands with drum and bass producers Noisia. They described the new album as being different, both lyrically and musically, and posted frequent updates via their Twitter account.

In August, the band confirmed the release of the M.A.D. EP, which contained 3 brand new tracks and 3 remixes of the track "M.A.D.". The EP was released digitally in September. The band's second studio album, For the Masses, was released on 25 January 2010.

The band unveiled their new single, "Turn the Lights Out" on 10 November 2009 on their Myspace.

On 25 January 2010, Hadouken! released For the Masses, which reached No. 17 in the UK album chart on the week of its release. The album was followed up by a new mix of single "Mic Check" which included a sample from Tina Moore's "Never Gonna Let You Go".

In May 2010, Hadouken! wrote an anthem, "Things Could Only Get Worse", for the UK Labour Party as part of the lead up to the 2010 General Election.

=== Mecha Love and The Oxygen EP and other activity (2010–2011) ===
Hadouken! revealed on 30 May 2010, via Twitter, that work has been started on their third album, and on 31 May, they revealed demos of new tracks had been written. A new single, "Mecha Love", was released on 17 October.

Following the radio debut of "Mecha Love", James Smith confirmed that a second single had been recorded and was ready for release. "Oxygen" was released digitally on 7 November 2010; the "Oxygen" EP was later released on 18 January 2012.

In 2011, the band played at London's O2 Arena, for the Transformation Trust Rock Assembly.

=== Every Weekend (2011–2014) ===
On 18 April 2011, Hadouken! signed to independent label Ministry of Sound with whom they released two singles 'Bad Signal' and 'Parasite'.. On 12 April 2012, Zane Lowe premiered the band's new single "Parasite" on his BBC Radio 1 show and it was made available as on their website as a free download soon after. The remixes were revealed on their official Soundcloud page. On 12 June 2012, Zane Lowe gave "Bad Signal", their new single, released 5 August 2012, its first play, on his BBC Radio 1 show. On 17 August 2012, the band supported Example alongside DJ Fresh at the iTunes Festival. They performed a new track "Daylight" for the second ever time live, produced by Drumsound and Bassline Smith alongside a mixture of new and old tracks.

On 27 December 2012, the band announced that their third studio album will be called 'Every Weekend' and will be released through their own label 'Surface Noise Recordings'. The group made an appearance in 2012 on Feed Me's "Trapdoor" and James provided vocals for KillSonik's song "Slaughterhouse" this year.

On 22 January 2013, Hadouken! released a follow-up video to 'People Are Awesome', titled 'People Are Awesome 2013'. The video featured the track 'Levitate' taken from the album 'Every Weekend'. 'People Are Awesome 2013' was the number one most watched video on YouTube around the world, gaining 20 million views in its first week. The video currently has over 100 million views on YouTube, making it more successful than the first 'People Are Awesome' viral, which currently sits at 66 million views. The track 'Levitate' went reached the 69th place in the billboard charts and reached the Top 10 iTunes charts in the US, UK, Canada and Australia. and 87th in UKs OCC single charts.

The album Every Weekend was released on 18 March 2013 and peaked at 35th rank in OCC single charts in the UK.

Hadouken! also featured on Loadstar's song "Boa" from the album Future Perfect and Tom Swoon & Paris Blohm's single "Synchronize".

=== Hiatus (2014–present) ===
On 10 November 2014, Hadouken! announced their hiatus through Facebook. James Smith has continued to feature on various songs by other artist under the name James Hadouken. Meanwhile Daniel & Chris Rice as well as Nick Purcell continued to play in the band Cast of Lions.

On 25 December 2019, the remix of "Oxygen" was played in the closing scene of Canadian sitcom, Letterkenny, Season 8, Episode 1, "Miss Fire".

From February to April 2023, a series of previously unreleased singles appeared on streaming platforms. Those songs were "Bounce (Myspace Version)", "Girls" and "Superstar (Myspace Version)".

== Members ==
- James Smith – lead vocals, keyboards (2006–present)
- Alice Spooner – keyboards, vocals (2006–present)
- Daniel "Pilau" Rice – electric guitar, backing vocals (2006–present)
- Christopher Purcell – bass guitar, backing vocals (2006–present)
- Nick Rice – drums (2006–present)

== Discography ==
- Music for an Accelerated Culture (2008)
- For the Masses (2010)
- Every Weekend (2013)

=== Productions ===
- Meg – Freak
- Meg – Toxic

=== Remixes ===
- Klaxons – "Atlantis to Interzone"
- The Whip – "Frustration"
- Bloc Party – "The Prayer"
- Bolt Action Five - "Tree Friends Tree Foe"
- Plan B - "No More Eatin"
- Does it Offend You, Yeah? – "Dawn of the Dead"
- Don Broco - "Hold On"
- Sugababes – "Get Sexy"
- Twin Atlantic - "Make A Beast Of Myself"
- Kids in Glass Houses - "Animals"
- The Prodigy - "Warrior's Dance"
- DJ Fresh featuring RaVaughn - "The Feeling"
- The Midnight Beast - Love Bites

=== Remixed ===
- Crank It Up - Clik Clik Remix 3:54
- Crank It Up - Does It Offend You Yeah? Remix 5:51
- Crank It Up - Haunt Remix 9:31
- Crank It Up - Noisia Remix 1:00
- Declaration of War - Hadouken! vs. Kissy Sell Out Remix 3:02
- Declaration of War - Jeuce Remix 14:14
- Declaration of War - Mason Vocal Remix 4:55
- Declaration of War - Mason Dub Remix 2:12
- Declaration of War - The Whip Remix 4:31
- Get Smashed Gate Crash - David Wolf Remix 7:59
- Get Smashed Gate Crash - Dezz Jones vs. D&G Remix 0:19
- House is Falling - Sigur Ros (Leit Aõ Lifi) Remix 0:59
- Leap of Faith - Shoes Remix 8:59
- Liquid Lives - Gutter Remix by Aaron LaCrate and Debonair Samir 23:08
- Liquid Lives - Noisia Remix 3:02
- M.A.D - Detboi Remix 3:02
- M.A.D - Phace Remix 9:58
- M.A.D - Plastician Remix 2:34
- Mecha Love - LAXX Remix 5:55
- Mecha Love - Nova Remix 2:45
- Mic Check - Camo and Krooked Remix 2:19
- Mic Check - Stupid Fresh Remix 34:33
- Oxygen - Alix Perez Remix 2:34
- Oxygen - Gemini Remix? 3:21
- Oxygen - Slugz and Joe London Remix 7:18
- Turn the Lights Out - JFB Remix 2:31
- Turn the Lights Out - Spor Remix 12:25
- Ugly - Dub Remix 2:33
- Parasite - Break Remix 2:31
- Parasite - SKisM & Zomboy Remix 1:56
- Parasite - Shadow Child Remix 2:57
- Parasite - Akira Kiteshi Rulin' Remix 2:31
- Bad Signal - Wideboys Remix 6:00
- Bad Signal - The Prototypes Remix 4:44
- Bad Signal - Xilent Remix 2:12
- Levitate - Koven Remix 2:31
- Levitate - Swindle Remix 4:34
- Levitate - Alex Light Remix 59:58

== Awards and nominations ==
Hadouken! have had some success at the BT Digital Music Awards, where they received two nominations in the Best Electronic Artist/DJ category in 2007 and 2008, winning the 2008 award.

Year	Nominee / work	Award	Result
2007	Hadouken!	Best Electronic Artist/DJ	Nominated
2008	Hadouken!	Best Electronic Artist/DJ	Won

== Soundtracks and syncs ==
- BBC Switch with Annie Mac and Nick Grimshaw, Leap of Faith: Opening Theme (2007)
- Converse - Band of Ballers Campaign (August 2009)
- Rebirth and Mic Check - National Sports Forum:Promo Trailer (January 2010)
- Turn the Lights Out - MMA: EA Sports (February 2010)
- M.A.D - Piranha 3D (March 2010)
- Bombshock - Need for Speed: Hot Pursuit 2010: EA Games (November 2010)
- M.A.D - The Sims 3: EP3 (July 2010)
- Turn the Lights Out - Crysis 2 Trailer (August 2010)
- Bombshock - Fast Five Trailer (April 2011)
- Turn the Lights Out - The Amazing Spider-Man Video Game Trailer (June 2012)
- Bombshock - Diary of a Wimpy Kid: Dog Days (August 2012)
- Bliss Out - FIFA 13 (September 2012)
- Levitate - featured on FA Cup reply on ESPN (January 2013)
- Levitate - Badminton on Sky Sports 4 (March 2013)
- Levitate - Closing sequence of Sky Sports Soccer Sunday (March 2013)
- Mic Check (Camo & Krooked Remix) - Asphalt 8: Airborne (August 2013)
- House Is Falling - CBBC Wild! Series 2, VT Insert (September 2014)

== Television appearances ==
- MTV Australia (August 2008)
- BBC Switch with Annie Mac and Nick Grimshaw - Leap of Faith Performance
- Channel 4 - 4Play (Hadouken! Special)
- E4 -The Midnight Beast (as a cameo for their friends series)

== Notable live appearances ==
- Summer Sonic Festival, Osaka (11 August 2007)
- Summer Sonic Festival, Tokyo (12 August 2007)
- Leeds Festival, Radio 1/NME Stage (24 August 2007)
- Reading Festival, Radio 1/NME Stage (25 August 2007)
- Ibiza Rocks, Manumission (28 August 2007)
- NME Brats, Koko (7 Feb 2007)
- RockNess Festival, Clash Stage, Scotland (8 June 2008)
- Glastonbury Festival, John Peel Stage (27 June 2008)
- iTunes Festival 2008, Koko. London (3 July 2008)
- Splendor in the Grass, Byron Bay. Australia (2 August 2008)
- Summer Sonic, Osaka (11 August 2008)
- Summer Sonic, Tokyo (12 August 2008)
- Bestival, Isle of Wight (6 September 2008)
- Camden Roundhouse, London (18 October 2008)
- Pukkelpop Festival, Belgium (August 2008)
- Lowlands Festival, the Netherlands (August 2008)
- Melt Festival, Hamburg (July 2008)
- Exit festival, Serbia (July 2009)
- Victoria Park w. Tiesto, London (31 July 2009)
- Stagedive Day Out Festival, Sweden (22 August 2009)
- Warrior's Dance Festival W/ The Prodigy, Makuhari Messe, Tokyo (20 September 2009)
- BBC Radio 1's Big Weekend (22 May 2010)
- Razmatazz Festival (5 June 2010)
- RockNess Festival, Scotland 2010 (13 June 2010)
- Dour Festival, Belgium (15 July 2010)
- Underage Festival, Victoria Park (1 August 2010)
- Leeds Festival, Radio 1/NME Stage (24 August 2010)
- Reading Festival, Radio 1/NME Stage (25 August 2010)
- Pendulum 2010 Arena Tour Main Support (December 2010)
- Isle of Wight Festival, The Big Top (June 2011)
- Sziget Festival, Hungary (August 2011)
- Cambridge Junction (16 September 2011)
- Birmingham NIA
- Wembley Arena
- Nottingham Trent FM Arena
- Manchester Central Arena
- Newcastle Radio Arena
- Aberdeen AECC
- Rock Assembly, Millennium Dome, London (2011)
- Volt Festival, Hungary (June 2012)
- Reading and Leeds Festivals, Radio 1/NME Stage (August 2012)
- Reading and Leeds Festivals, Main Stage (August 2013)
- Cambridge Junction (28 October 2013)
