= New rave =

Music genre and scene

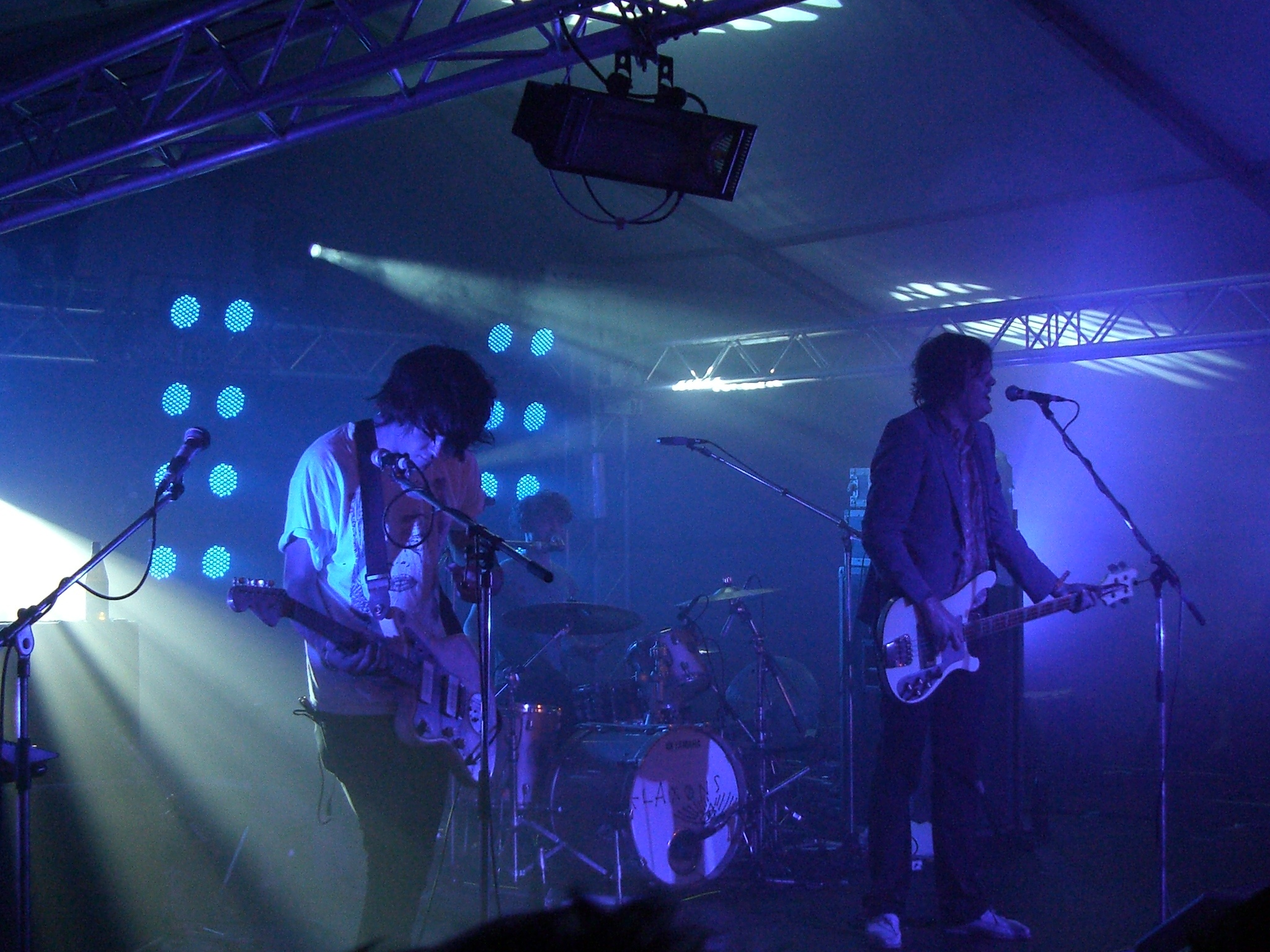
- Klaxons performing in 2007
- Other names: Nü rave; nu rave; neu rave; nu-rave
- Stylistic origins: Dance-punk; rave; post-punk revival; indie rock; alternative dance
- Cultural origins: Mid-2000s, United Kingdom
- Typical instruments: Guitar; bass; drums; drum machine; percussion; synthesizer

Regional scenes
- Manchester; Glasgow; London; Oxford; Leeds

Other topics
- Alternative dance; wonky pop; blog rock; bloghouse

New rave (also known as nü rave, nu rave or neu rave) is a microgenre of indie rock and alternative dance coined by Klaxons founder Jamie Reynolds to describe a British alternative music scene that emerged between 2005 and late 2008. Characterized by fast-paced electronica-influenced indie music that drew influences from 1980s Madchester and rave scenes. The genre influenced the development of blog-related music scenes such as bloghouse and blog rock.

Notable acts include Klaxons, Trash Fashion, New Young Pony Club, Hadouken!, Late of the Pier and Shitdisco.

== Etymology ==
The term was coined by Klaxons founder Jamie Reynolds, who later declared they were not new rave, describing it as a "joke that's got out of hand", stating that:

The whole idea of new rave was to take the piss out of the media by making them talk about something that didn't exist, just for our own amusement. And they'd say, I appreciate that, but can you tell me more about new rave?

The genre is a play on the term "new wave" as well as being a "new" version of rave music. During the late 2000s, music blogs and press such as NME and The Guardian further popularized the term. Though several artists associated with the scene rejected the label.

== Characteristics ==
New rave is characterized by the musical fusion of electronica with indie rock and dance-punk styles, described by The Guardian as "an in-yer-face, DIY disco riposte to the sensitive indie rock touted by bands like Bloc Party." The aesthetics of the new rave scene are similar to those of the original rave scene, being mostly centred on psychedelic visual effects, glowsticks, neon lights. Artists often dress in extremely bright and fluorescent colored clothing. New rave has been defined more by the image and aesthetic of its bands and supporters, than by its music.

Bands such as the Sunshine Underground, CSS (Cansei de Ser Sexy), and Hot Chip have also been labeled as new rave, while M.I.A. has been described as "a new raver before it was old." Stylist Carri Mundane described it as funny, stating:

Vacant in retro. It's just a marketing machine. ... I guess it was a fun time but I'm more excited about what happens now. The next level - the next generation. There's a mood of neo-spiritualism and futurism that excites me.

Los Angeles Times critic Margaret Wappler comments that the "minimalist dance-punk of LCD Soundsystem, the analog classicism of Simian Mobile Disco, the fanatical electro-thrash of Justice, the international amalgam of M.I.A., the agitated funk of !!! (Chk Chk Chk) and the art-schooled disco-sleaze of Cansei de Ser Sexy" contributed to the thriving 'new rave' dance scene, which led to a rediscovery of indie rockers, and a critical and intellectual revolution in dance music. Artists in the genre overlapped with other musical developments during the 2000s such as dance-punk, blog rock, and bloghouse.

== History ==
=== Origins (2000s–2010s) ===
New rave originally emerged in the 2000s British electronic music scene, with artists such as Klaxons, Trash Fashion, New Young Pony Club, Hadouken!, Late of the Pier and Shitdisco. The term was coined by Klaxons founder Jamie Reynolds, who later declared they were not new rave, describing it as a "joke that's got out of hand." NME later further popularised the term throughout 2006 and 2007, though later claiming in mid-2008 that "New Rave is over". The movement would later influence the contemporaneous bloghouse scene.

On 13 October 2006, music critic John Harris stated in The Guardian that the genre is nothing more than a "piss-poor supposed 'youthquake'" that will soon go out of fashion in the same way as rave.

== See also ==
- Blogosphere
