= Grindie =

Fusion of both indie or alternative and grime music

- Other names: Grime-indie, grime indie
- Stylistic origins: Indie rock; grime; alternative rock; UK garage; hip hop; alternative hip hop; pop; industrial rock
- Typical instruments: Guitar; bass guitar; drums; music sequencer; digital audio workstation; turntables

Other topics
- Nu metal; crunkcore; rap rock; emo hip hop

Grindie (also known as grime-indie or grime indie) is a fusion genre that emerged in the 2000s which merges indie rock or alternative rock with grime music. The term "grindie" was originally coined by music journalist John Doran in 2004 and later adopted by producer Statik who developed the style through the compilation album Grindie Vol. 1 and his collaborations with the English indie rock band Larrikin Love.

== History ==
In 2004, music journalist John Doran coined the term "grindie" as a joke. It was later adopted by grime producer Statik and the NME. Statik was one of the main proponents of the genre through his collaborations with Larrikin Love. Statik initially used the term "grindie" as a joke and was first to release an album containing only grindie tracks, Grindie Vol. 1 containing over 60 songs. Statik stated he turned towards creating a new sound due to the staleness he felt the grime scene was experiencing at the time. The genre initially received some criticisms by grime fans who perceived it to be a fad created by magazines, rather than a fully fledged scene.

Akira the Don, who signed to Interscope Records in 2004, released multiple mixtapes sampling rock and indie artists, including the "Third Hand Wire Riffs" mixtape featuring Elastica, Big Narstie, Lethal Bizzle, Martin Carr of the Boo Radleys and others.

Jack Nimble and Marvin the Martian / Marv the Marsh have been credited for creating the first grindie song, "Stay Off the Kane", released in 2005. The song was a remix of Art Brut's song "Emily Kane". Art Brut later invited Why Lout?, the group Marvin and Jack Nimble were members of, to be the opening act for them at Koko. In 2006, the group released Hoods & Badges EP on the Universal Digital record label.

Akira the Don produced tracks for grime star Big Narstie's "What's the Story Brixton Glory" mixtape that sampled Oasis and Arctic Monkeys, that was later cited as an influence by Ed Sheeran. Grime artist Lethal Bizzle became a prominent artist in the subgenre, releasing multiple top 40 hits produced by Akira the Don that sampled the Clash, the Breeders and Sham 69, also collaborating with Statik, the Rakes, Babyshambles, Bloc Party, and Test Icicles. Lethal Bizzle was at the time struggling due to clubs banning him from performing. Grindie allowed Lethal Bizzle to find a new, indie, audience and platform. Charli XCX was dubbed the "Grindie Princess" during her early career. Hadouken! was also associated with the scene.
