= List of 2008 albums =

The following is a list of albums, EPs, and mixtapes released in 2008. These albums are (1) original, i.e. excluding reissues, remasters, and compilations of previously released recordings, and (2) notable, defined as having received significant coverage from reliable sources independent of the subject.

For additional information about bands formed, reformed, disbanded, or on hiatus, for deaths of musicians, and for links to musical awards, see 2008 in music.

== First quarter ==
=== January ===
List of albums released in January 2008
Go to: January | February | March | April | May | June | July | August | September | October | November | December | Back to top
| Release date | Artist | Album | Genre | Label | Ref. |
| January 1 | Ayumi Hamasaki | Guilty | Rock | Avex Trax | |
| January 1 | Praxis | Profanation (Preparation for a Coming Darkness) | Experimental rock, alternative rock | NAGUAL, M.O.D. Technologies | |
| January 1 | The Smashing Pumpkins | American Gothic | Alternative rock | Reprise | |
| January 8 | For the Fallen Dreams | Changes | Metalcore, melodic hardcore | Rise | |
| January 8 | Luke Doucet & the White Falcon | Blood's Too Rich | Indie rock, country | Six Shooter | |
| January 8 | Rhonda Vincent | Good Thing Going | Country, bluegrass | Rounder | |
| January 8 | Sia | Some People Have Real Problems | Pop | Hear Music, Monkey Puzzle Records | |
| January 8 | Teenage Bottlerocket | Warning Device | Punk rock | Red Scare | |
| January 11 | Benedictum | Seasons of Tragedy | Heavy metal | Locomotive Music | |
| January 14 | British Sea Power | Do You Like Rock Music? | Indie rock, post-punk revival | Rough Trade | |
| January 14 | The Dø | A Mouthful | Indie rock, folk rock | Cinq7 | |
| January 14 | Ringo Starr | Liverpool 8 | Rock | Capitol | |
| January 15 | Hayden | In Field & Town | Alternative country, indie folk, folk rock | Hardwood | |
| January 15 | Jon Foreman | Winter | Acoustic | Lowercase people, Credential | |
| January 15 | The Magnetic Fields | Distortion | Indie pop, noise pop, shoegaze | Nonesuch | |
| January 15 | Matthew West | Something to Say | CCM | Sparrow | |
| January 15 | Number One Gun | The North Pole Project | Christian rock, alternative rock, emo | Tooth & Nail | |
| January 15 | Once Nothing | First Came the Law | Metalcore | Solid State | |
| January 21 | Black Mountain | In the Future | Psychedelic rock, progressive rock, space rock | Jagjaguwar | |
| January 21 | Lightspeed Champion | Falling Off the Lavender Bridge | Indie rock, folk | Domino | |
| January 22 | The Audition | Champion | Pop-punk | Victory | |
| January 22 | Big Noyd | Illustrious | East Coast hip-hop, gangsta rap | Koch | |
| January 22 | Byzantine | Oblivion Beckons | Groove metal | Prosthetic | |
| January 22 | Chuck Wicks | Starting Now | Country | RCA Nashville | |
| January 22 | Daedelus | Live at Low End Theory | Electronic | Alpha Pup | |
| January 22 | Dengue Fever | Venus on Earth | | | |
| January 22 | Disfear | Live the Storm | Crust punk, d-beat | Relapse | |
| January 22 | Drive-By Truckers | Brighter Than Creation's Dark | Southern rock, folk rock | New West | |
| January 22 | Foxy Shazam | Introducing | Alternative rock, post-hardcore, experimental rock | Ferret, New Weatherman Records | |
| January 22 | Matt Costa | Unfamiliar Faces | Folk | Brushfire | |
| January 22 | With Blood Comes Cleansing | Horror | Deathcore | Victory | |
| January 22 | ZOX | Line in the Sand | Alternative rock, reggae rock, ska | SideOneDummy | |
| January 23 | Ayreon | 01011001 | Progressive metal, progressive rock | Inside Out Music | |
| January 24 | Have a Nice Life | Deathconsciousness | Shoegaze, post-punk, gothic rock | Enemies List Home Recordings, The Flenser | |
| January 25 | Alestorm | Captain Morgan's Revenge | Power metal, folk metal | Napalm | |
| January 25 | Avantasia | The Scarecrow | Symphonic metal, progressive metal, power metal | Nuclear Blast | |
| January 25 | Brainstorm | Downburst | Heavy metal, power metal | Metal Blade | |
| January 25 | Heaven Shall Burn | Iconoclast (Part 1: The Final Resistance) | Melodic death metal, metalcore | Century Media | |
| January 28 | Adele | 19 | Blue-eyed soul | XL | |
| January 28 | Bullet for My Valentine | Scream Aim Fire | Melodic metalcore, thrash metal | Jive | |
| January 28 | Clark | Turning Dragon | IDM, experimental, techno | Warp | |
| January 28 | Joe Jackson | Rain | Rock, pop | Rykodisc | |
| January 28 | Prosumer and Murat Tepeli | Serenity | Detroit techno, Chicago house, deep house | Ostgut Ton | |
| January 28 | Sarah Brightman | Symphony | Classical crossover, classical, symphonic rock | Manhattan | |
| January 28 | Sons and Daughters | This Gift | Indie rock | Domino | |
| January 28 | These New Puritans | Beat Pyramid | Indie rock, post-punk, electronic | Angular, Domino | |
| January 29 | Autechre | Quaristice | Electronic | Warp | |
| January 29 | Chris Walla | Field Manual | Indie rock | Barsuk | |
| January 29 | Course of Nature | Damaged | Alternative rock, post-grunge, hard rock | Silent Majority | |
| January 29 | Decrepit Birth | Diminishing Between Worlds | Technical death metal | Unique Leader Records | |
| January 29 | Dub Trio | Another Sound Is Dying | Dub, punk rock | Ipecac | |
| January 29 | Hawksley Workman | Between the Beautifuls | Indie rock | Universal Music Canada | |
| January 29 | The Helio Sequence | Keep Your Eyes Ahead | Indie rock | Sub Pop | |
| January 29 | Idina Menzel | I Stand | Pop | Warner Bros., Reprise | |
| January 29 | The Mars Volta | The Bedlam in Goliath | Progressive rock, jazz fusion, funk rock | Gold Standard Laboratories, Universal Motown | |
| January 29 | Protest the Hero | Fortress | Progressive metal, mathcore | Vagrant, Underground Operations | |
| January 29 | Thao & the Get Down Stay Down | We Brave Bee Stings and All | Folk | Kill Rock Stars | |
| January 29 | Vampire Weekend | Vampire Weekend | Indie pop, baroque pop, worldbeat | XL | |
| January 29 | Xiu Xiu | Women as Lovers | Art rock, experimental, post-punk | Kill Rock Stars | |
| January 30 | Jane Ira Bloom | Mental Weather | Jazz | Outline Records | |
| January 30 | Koda Kumi | Kingdom | Pop, R&B, rock | Rhythm Zone | |
| January 30 | Lykke Li | Youth Novels | Indie pop, synth-pop, dance-pop | LL Recordings | |
| January 30 | Tristan Prettyman | Hello...x | Pop | Virgin | |

=== February ===
List of albums released in February 2008
Go to: January | February | March | April | May | June | July | August | September | October | November | December | Back to top
| Release date | Artist | Album | Genre | Label | Ref. |
| February 4 | Hot Chip | Made in the Dark | Indietronica, alternative dance | EMI | |
| February 4 | Laura Marling | Alas, I Cannot Swim | Folk-pop | Virgin | |
| February 4 | Miss Kittin | BatBox | Electronica, electroclash, dance | Nobody's Bizzness | |
| February 4 | Morcheeba | Dive Deep | Trip hop, downtempo | Echo, Ultra | |
| February 5 | Bob Mould | District Line | Alternative rock | Anti- | |
| February 5 | Clipse | We Got It for Cheap, Vol. 3 | Hip-hop | Re-Up Records | |
| February 5 | Edison Glass | Time Is Fiction | Indie rock | Credential | |
| February 5 | Gwen Stacy | The Life I Know | Metalcore, post-hardcore | Ferret Music | |
| February 5 | Horace Silver | Live at Newport '58 | Hard bop | Blue Note | |
| February 5 | Jack Johnson | Sleep Through the Static | Folk rock, soft rock | Brushfire, Universal | |
| February 5 | Jason Collett | Here's to Being Here | Indie rock, alternative country | Arts & Crafts | |
| February 5 | Lenny Kravitz | It Is Time for a Love Revolution | Rock | Virgin | |
| February 5 | Nada Surf | Lucky | Alternative rock, indie rock | Barsuk | |
| February 5 | Sheryl Crow | Detours | Rock, pop rock, folk rock | A&M | |
| February 5 | Taylor Dayne | Satisfied | Dance-pop, pop rock, soul | Adrenaline Records | |
| February 5 | They Might Be Giants | Here Come the 123s | Children's music | Disney Sound, Idlewild Records | |
| February 11 | The Mae Shi | HLLLYH | Experimental, punk | Team Shi, Moshi Moshi | |
| February 12 | Averse Sefira | Advent Parallax | Black metal | Candlelight | |
| February 12 | Marco Benevento | Invisible Baby | | Hyena Records | |
| February 12 | Natalie Grant | Relentless | CCM | Curb | |
| February 12 | Newworldson | Salvation Station | CCM | Inpop | |
| February 12 | Sanctus Real | We Need Each Other | Christian rock, CCM, pop rock | Sparrow | |
| February 12 | Secret and Whisper | Great White Whale | Post-hardcore, alternative rock | Tooth & Nail | |
| February 12 | Simple Plan | Simple Plan | Alternative rock, pop-punk | Lava, Atlantic | |
| February 15 | Eluveitie | Slania | Folk metal, melodic death metal, Celtic metal | Nuclear Blast | |
| February 18 | Atlas Sound | Let the Blind Lead Those Who Can See but Cannot Feel | Experimental rock | Kranky, 4AD | |
| February 18 | Dismember | Dismember | Death metal | Regain | |
| February 18 | The Feeling | Join with Us | Power pop, soft rock | Island, Universal | |
| February 18 | I Was a Cub Scout | I Want You to Know That There Is Always Hope | Indie rock | Abeano XL | |
| February 18 | The Mountain Goats | Heretic Pride | Folk rock, indie rock | 4AD | |
| February 18 | Pete and the Pirates | Little Death | Indie rock | Stolen | |
| February 18 | To-Mera | Delusions | Progressive metal | Candlelight | |
| February 19 | Akrobatik | Absolute Value | Hip-hop | Fat Beats Records | |
| February 19 | Cherry Poppin' Daddies | Susquehanna | | Space Age Bachelor Pad Records | |
| February 19 | Chris Cagle | My Life's Been a Country Song | Country | Capitol Nashville | |
| February 19 | Dead to Fall | Are You Serious? | Metalcore | Victory | |
| February 19 | Genghis Tron | Board Up the House | Experimental metal, mathcore | Relapse, Lovepump United Records | |
| February 19 | Grand Archives | The Grand Archives | Indie rock | Sub Pop | |
| February 19 | Hate Eternal | Fury & Flames | Death metal | Metal Blade | |
| February 19 | Jim Jones | Harlem's American Gangster | East Coast hip-hop | Koch | |
| February 19 | Secondhand Serenade | A Twist in My Story | Emo, alternative rock, acoustic rock | Glassnote | |
| February 19 | This Is Hell | Misfortunes | Hardcore punk | Trustkill | |
| February 19 | The Trews | No Time for Later | Hard rock, alternative rock | Bumstead | |
| February 22 | Los Campesinos! | Hold on Now, Youngster... | Indie pop, noise pop | Wichita, Arts & Crafts | |
| February 22 | Exciter | Thrash Speed Burn | Speed metal, thrash metal | Massacre | |
| February 22 | Goldfrapp | Seventh Tree | Folktronica, ambient, downtempo | Mute | |
| February 22 | Janet Jackson | Discipline | Pop, electronic, R&B | Island | |
| February 22 | Steel Attack | Carpe DiEnd | Power metal | Massacre | |
| February 22 | Unheilig | Puppenspiel | Neue Deutsche Härte | Four Rock Entertainment | |
| February 25 | Dark Fortress | Eidolon | Black metal | Century Media | |
| February 25 | Sébastien Tellier | Sexuality | Synth-pop | Record Makers, Lucky Number Music | |
| February 25 | Toumani Diabaté | The Mandé Variations | Mande music | World Circuit, Nonesuch | |
| February 26 | The Afters | Never Going Back to OK | Christian rock | INO, Columbia | |
| February 26 | Beach House | Devotion | Dream pop | Carpark | |
| February 26 | Cadia | Cadia | CCM, Christian pop, Christian rock | Fervent | |
| February 26 | Children 18:3 | Children 18:3 | Punk rock, Christian punk | Tooth & Nail | |
| February 26 | Death Angel | Killing Season | Thrash metal | Nuclear Blast | |
| February 26 | Dolly Parton | Backwoods Barbie | Country | Dolly Records | |
| February 26 | Earth | The Bees Made Honey in the Lion's Skull | Rock | Southern Lord | |
| February 26 | Erykah Badu | New Amerykah Part One (4th World War) | Neo soul, funk, R&B | Universal Motown | |
| February 26 | Leeland | Opposite Way | Christian rock | Essential | |
| February 26 | MyChildren MyBride | Unbreakable | | Solid State | |
| February 26 | Pete Rock | NY's Finest | Hip-hop | Nature Sounds | |
| February 26 | Pillar | For the Love of the Game | Christian metal, alternative metal, hard rock | Essential | |
| February 26 | Plants and Animals | Parc Avenue | Indie rock | Secret City | |
| February 26 | Punch Brothers | Punch | Progressive bluegrass | Nonesuch | |
| February 26 | Shawty Lo | Units in the City | Hip-hop, gangsta rap | Warner Bros., Asylum, D4L Records | |
| February 26 | Stellar Kart | Expect the Impossible | Power pop, pop-punk, punk rock | Word | |
| February 26 | Webbie | Savage Life 2 | Southern hip-hop, gangsta rap | Trill Entertainment, Asylum, Atlantic | |
| February 27 | Danko Jones | Never Too Loud | Rock | Aquarius, Bad Taste | |
| February 29 | Agalloch | The White | Neofolk, dark ambient | Vendlus | |

=== March ===
List of albums released in March 2008
Go to: January | February | March | April | May | June | July | August | September | October | November | December | Back to top
| Release date | Artist | Album | Genre | Label | Ref. |
| March 2 | Nine Inch Nails | Ghosts I–IV | Dark ambient | The Null Corporation | |
| March 3 | Bauhaus | Go Away White | Gothic rock, funk rock, post-punk | Cooking Vinyl, Bauhaus Music | |
| March 3 | Billy Bragg | Mr Love & Justice | Rock | Cooking Vinyl, Anti-, Shock | |
| March 3 | The Black Crowes | Warpaint | Southern rock, blues rock, hard rock | Megaforce, Silver Arrow Records | |
| March 3 | The Charlatans | You Cross My Path | Electro, pop | Cooking Vinyl | |
| March 3 | Duffy | Rockferry | Blue-eyed soul, pop | A&M | |
| March 3 | Get Cape. Wear Cape. Fly | Searching for the Hows and Whys | Folk rock, folktronica, indie | Atlantic | |
| March 3 | Nick Cave and the Bad Seeds | Dig, Lazarus, Dig!!! | Gothic rock, post-punk, garage rock | Mute, Anti- | |
| March 4 | Alan Jackson | Good Time | Country | Arista Nashville | |
| March 4 | Ashton Shepherd | Sounds So Good | Country | MCA Nashville | |
| March 4 | Bizzy Bone | Ruthless | | Siccness | |
| March 4 | BoDeans | Still | Alternative rock | He and He Records | |
| March 4 | Burden of a Day | Blessed Be Our Ever After | | Rise | |
| March 4 | Cadence Weapon | Afterparty Babies | Alternative hip-hop, electronic | Anti-, Big Dada, Upper Class | |
| March 4 | Fireflight | Unbreakable | Hard rock, Christian rock, alternative metal | Flicker | |
| March 4 | Flogging Molly | Float | Celtic rock, punk rock | SideOneDummy | |
| March 4 | The Gutter Twins | Saturnalia | Alternative rock | Sub Pop | |
| March 4 | Kathleen Edwards | Asking for Flowers | Country, rock, pop | MapleMusic, Zoë | |
| March 4 | Murder by Death | Red of Tooth and Claw | Indie rock, country rock, folk | Vagrant | |
| March 4 | Nasum | Doombringer | Grindcore | Relapse | |
| March 4 | Smokin' Joe Kubek & Bnois King | Blood Brothers | | Alligator | |
| March 4 | Stephen Malkmus and the Jicks | Real Emotional Trash | Indie rock | Matador | |
| March 5 | Asian Kung-Fu Generation | World World World | Alternative rock | Kioon | |
| March 5 | Cosa Brava | Ragged Atlas | Experimental rock, free improvisation | Intakt | |
| March 5 | The Tallest Man on Earth | Shallow Grave | Folk | Gravitation | |
| March 7 | Boris | Smile | | Diwphalanx, Southern Lord | |
| March 7 | Meshuggah | obZen | Extreme metal, progressive metal, avant-garde metal | Nuclear Blast | |
| March 7 | Ruslana | Amazonka | Pop rock, dance-pop, electropop | Warner Bros., EMI | |
| March 10 | Bloodbath | Unblessing the Purity | Death metal | Peaceville | |
| March 10 | The Kills | Midnight Boom | Indie rock, garage rock | Domino | |
| March 10 | Thee Silver Mt. Zion Memorial Orchestra & Tra-La-La Band | 13 Blues for Thirteen Moons | | Constellation | |
| March 10 | Young Knives | Superabundance | Indie rock, post-punk revival | Transgressive | |
| March 11 | Del the Funky Homosapien | Eleventh Hour | Hip-hop | Definitive Jux | |
| March 11 | Fat Joe | The Elephant in the Room | Hip-hop | Terror Squad, Virgin, Imperial | |
| March 11 | Ill Niño | Enigma | Alternative metal, metalcore, nu metal | Cement Shoes Records | |
| March 11 | The Presidents of the United States of America | These Are the Good Times People | Alternative rock | Fugitive Recordings, Tooth & Nail | |
| March 11 | Rick Ross | Trilla | Hip-hop | Slip-n-Slide, Def Jam, Poe Boy | |
| March 11 | Snoop Dogg | Ego Trippin' | Hip-hop | Geffen | |
| March 11 | Son Lux | At War with Walls & Mazes | Post-rock | Anticon | |
| March 11 | Why? | Alopecia | Indie pop | Anticon | |
| March 12 | Kiuas | The New Dark Age | Power metal | Spinefarm | |
| March 14 | Mike Oldfield | Music of the Spheres | Classical | Universal Classics and Jazz, Mercury | |
| March 17 | Bryan Adams | 11 | Soft rock | Polydor | |
| March 17 | Muse | HAARP | Alternative rock, hard rock, progressive rock | Warner Bros., Helium-3 | |
| March 17 | Van Morrison | Keep It Simple | Jazz, folk, blues | Polydor, Lost Highway | |
| March 17 | We Are Scientists | Brain Thrust Mastery | Indie rock, post-punk revival | EMI | |
| March 17 | Youthmovies | Good Nature | Math rock, post-rock | Drowned in Sound | |
| March 18 | Addison Road | Addison Road | Christian rock, pop | INO | |
| March 18 | Black Tide | Light from Above | Heavy metal | Interscope | |
| March 18 | Bone Brothers | Still Creepin on Ah Come Up | | Real Talk | |
| March 18 | Bury Your Dead | Bury Your Dead | Hardcore punk, metalcore | Victory | |
| March 18 | Crystal Castles | Crystal Castles | Synth-punk, chiptune, noise | Lies Records, Last Gang | |
| March 18 | Danity Kane | Welcome to the Dollhouse | Pop, R&B | Bad Boy, Atlantic | |
| March 18 | Destroyer | Trouble in Dreams | Indie rock, chamber pop | Merge | |
| March 18 | Flo Rida | Mail on Sunday | Hip-hop, Southern hip-hop | Atlantic, Poe Boy | |
| March 18 | Gnarls Barkley | The Odd Couple | Psychedelic soul | Atlantic, Downtown | |
| March 18 | Jucifer | L'Autrichienne | Noise rock, sludge metal | Relapse | |
| March 18 | The Matches | A Band in Hope | Art rock, pop-punk | Epitaph | |
| March 18 | PlayRadioPlay! | Texas | Electronic, pop | Island | |
| March 18 | Rocko | Self Made | Hip-hop | Rocky Road, So So Def, Island | |
| March 18 | Sahg | II | Heavy metal, doom metal | Regain | |
| March 18 | She & Him | Volume One | Indie pop, alternative country | Merge | |
| March 18 | Sheek Louch | Silverback Gorilla | Hip-hop | Koch, D-Block Records | |
| March 18 | Unearthly Trance | Electrocution | | Relapse | |
| March 19 | Hikaru Utada | Heart Station | J-pop, R&B, electronica | EMI Music Japan | |
| March 21 | Firewind | The Premonition | Power metal | Century Media | |
| March 21 | Korpiklaani | Korven Kuningas | Folk metal | Nuclear Blast | |
| March 21 | Panic! at the Disco | Pretty. Odd. | Psychedelic pop, psychedelic rock, baroque pop | Fueled by Ramen | |
| March 22 | Cut Copy | In Ghost Colours | Electropop, alternative dance | Modular | |
| March 22 | Millencolin | Machine 15 | Pop-punk, punk rock, alternative rock | Burning Heart, Epitaph | |
| March 24 | Ancestors | Neptune with Fire | Psychedelic rock | Tee Pee / North Atlantic Sound | |
| March 24 | Does It Offend You, Yeah? | You Have No Idea What You're Getting Yourself Into | | Virgin, Startime, Almost Gold | |
| March 24 | Foals | Antidotes | Indie rock, math rock, dance-punk | Transgressive, Sub Pop | |
| March 24 | Guillemots | Red | Indie rock | Polydor | |
| March 24 | Mystery Jets | Twenty One | Indie rock | 679 | |
| March 24 | Pennywise | Reason to Believe | Punk rock, melodic hardcore | Myspace, Epitaph | |
| March 24 | Supergrass | Diamond Hoo Ha | Alternative rock | Parlophone, Astralwerks | |
| March 25 | The B-52s | Funplex | Rock, pop rock, dance-pop | Astralwerks | |
| March 25 | Cavalera Conspiracy | Inflikted | Groove metal, thrash metal, death metal | Roadrunner | |
| March 25 | Counting Crows | Saturday Nights & Sunday Mornings | Alternative rock, folk rock | Geffen | |
| March 25 | eMC | The Show | East Coast hip-hop, underground hip-hop | M3 | |
| March 25 | Guilty Simpson | Ode to the Ghetto | Hip-hop | Stones Throw | |
| March 25 | Jon Foreman | Spring | Acoustic | lowercase people, Credential | |
| March 25 | Justin Townes Earle | The Good Life | Country | Bloodshot | |
| March 25 | The Raconteurs | Consolers of the Lonely | Blues rock, power pop | Third Man, Warner Bros. | |
| March 25 | Roseanna Vitro and Kenny Werner | The Delirium Blues Project: Serve or Suffer | Vocal jazz, R&B, blues | Half Note | |
| March 25 | Starfield | I Will Go | CCM | Sparrow | |
| March 26 | Poets of the Fall | Revolution Roulette | Indie rock, alternative rock | Insomniac Records | |
| March 28 | Illdisposed | The Prestige | Death metal | AFM | |
| March 28 | Midnattsol | Nordlys | Gothic metal, folk metal | Napalm | |
| March 29 | Moby | Last Night | Electronic dance music | Mute | |
| March 31 | Boy Kill Boy | Stars and the Sea | Alternative rock, indie pop | Vertigo | |
| March 31 | Francis Cabrel | Des roses et des orties | | Columbia | |
| March 31 | Nazareth | The Newz | Hard rock, blues rock | Edel | |
| March 31 | R.E.M. | Accelerate | Hard rock, punk rock | Warner Bros. | |
| March 31 | The Sword | Gods of the Earth | Heavy metal, doom metal, stoner metal | Kemado | |

== Second quarter ==
=== April ===
List of albums released in April 2008
Go to: January | February | March | April | May | June | July | August | September | October | November | December | Back to top
| Release date | Artist | Album | Genre | Label | Ref. |
| April 1 | 8Ball, E.D.I. | Doin' It Big | Hip-hop | Real Talk, Koch | |
| April 1 | Anti-Flag | The Bright Lights of America | Punk rock | RCA | |
| April 1 | AZ | Undeniable | Hip-hop | Koch | |
| April 1 | The Black Keys | Attack & Release | Garage rock, blues rock | Nonesuch, V2 | |
| April 1 | Delirious? | Kingdom of Comfort | Alternative rock, Christian rock | Sparrow | |
| April 1 | Donna Lewis | In the Pink | Pop | Peruzi Music | |
| April 1 | Fall Out Boy | Live in Phoenix | Pop-punk, pop rock, emo pop | Island | |
| April 1 | For Today | Ekklesia | Metalcore | Facedown | |
| April 1 | George Strait | Troubadour | Neotraditional country, honky-tonk | MCA Nashville | |
| April 1 | Hawk Nelson | Hawk Nelson Is My Friend | Christian rock, pop-punk, punk rock | BEC | |
| April 1 | In Flames | A Sense of Purpose | Alternative metal | Nuclear Blast | |
| April 1 | Josh Gracin | We Weren't Crazy | Country | Lyric Street | |
| April 1 | Matthew Ryan | Matthew Ryan vs. The Silver State | Alternative country | 00:02:59, One Little Indian | |
| April 1 | Ministry and Co-Conspirators | Cover Up | Industrial metal, thrash metal | 13th Planet | |
| April 1 | Origin | Antithesis | Technical death metal | Relapse | |
| April 1 | Sevendust | Chapter VII: Hope & Sorrow | Alternative metal | Asylum | |
| April 1 | Sun Kil Moon | April | Folk rock | Caldo Verde | |
| April 1 | Theory of a Deadman | Scars & Souvenirs | Hard rock | Roadrunner | |
| April 1 | Trina | Still da Baddest | Hip-hop, dirty rap | Slip-n-Slide | |
| April 1 | Veil of Maya | The Common Man's Collapse | Deathcore, melodic death metal, technical death metal | Sumerian | |
| April 1 | The Wood Brothers | Loaded | | Blue Note | |
| April 2 | Tapes 'n Tapes | Walk It Off | Indie rock | XL | |
| April 4 | Emil Bulls | The Black Path | Alternative metal | Drakkar | |
| April 4 | Forever Slave | Tales for Bad Girls | | | |
| April 4 | Mariah Carey | E=MC² | Pop, hip-hop, R&B | Island | |
| April 7 | The Breeders | Mountain Battles | Art punk | 4AD | |
| April 7 | Children of Bodom | Blooddrunk | Melodic death metal, thrash metal | Spinefarm | |
| April 7 | The Courteeners | St. Jude | Indie rock | Polydor | |
| April 7 | Distorted | Voices from Within | Death-doom, Oriental metal, progressive metal | Candlelight, Helicon | |
| April 7 | The Long Blondes | Couples | Indie rock | Rough Trade | |
| April 8 | Ashes Divide | Keep Telling Myself It's Alright | Alternative rock, alternative metal, hard rock | Island | |
| April 8 | Cloud Cult | Feel Good Ghosts (Tea-Partying Through Tornadoes) | Indie pop | Earthology | |
| April 8 | Dokken | Lightning Strikes Again | Heavy metal, hard rock | Frontiers Music | |
| April 8 | The Grouch | Show You the World | Hip-hop | Legendary Music | |
| April 8 | Hayes Carll | Trouble in Mind | Country | Lost Highway | |
| April 8 | James Otto | Sunset Man | Country | Warner Bros. Nashville | |
| April 8 | Justin Rutledge | Man Descending | Alternative country | Six Shooter | |
| April 8 | Living Legends | The Gathering | Hip-hop | Legendary Music | |
| April 8 | Marcia Ball | Peace, Love & BBQ | Blues, R&B | Alligator | |
| April 8 | P.O.D. | When Angels & Serpents Dance | Alternative metal, alternative rock | INO | |
| April 8 | Ron Sexsmith | Exit Strategy of the Soul | | Kensaltown | |
| April 8 | Someone Still Loves You Boris Yeltsin | Pershing | Indie pop | Polyvinyl | |
| April 11 | The Kooks | Konk | Indie rock | Virgin | |
| April 11 | M83 | Saturdays = Youth | Dream pop, shoegaze, synth-pop | Virgin | |
| April 12 | The Presets | Apocalypso | Dance | Modular | |
| April 14 | Blood Red Shoes | Box of Secrets | Indie rock | Mercury | |
| April 14 | Rush | Snakes & Arrows Live | Progressive rock, hard rock | Anthem | |
| April 15 | Anew Revolution | Rise | | Koch | |
| April 15 | Arsis | We Are the Nightmare | Technical death metal, melodic death metal | Nuclear Blast | |
| April 15 | Belphegor | Bondage Goat Zombie | Blackened death metal | Nuclear Blast | |
| April 15 | The Black Angels | Directions to See a Ghost | Psychedelic rock | Light in the Attic | |
| April 15 | The Brian Jonestown Massacre | My Bloody Underground | Neo-psychedelia, shoegaze | A Records | |
| April 15 | Chasen | Shine Through the Stars | | OMG Records | |
| April 15 | Constantines | Kensington Heights | Indie rock, alternative rock | Arts & Crafts | |
| April 15 | Destroy the Runner | I, Lucifer | Melodic metalcore, post-hardcore, progressive metal | Solid State | |
| April 15 | James McMurtry | Just Us Kids | Country | Lightning Rod Records | |
| April 15 | Ketil Bjørnstad & Terje Rypdal | Life in Leipzig | Chamber jazz | ECM | |
| April 15 | Lady Antebellum | Lady Antebellum | Country | Capitol Nashville | |
| April 15 | The Last Shadow Puppets | The Age of the Understatement | Symphonic pop, pop rock, baroque pop | Domino | |
| April 15 | Phantom Planet | Raise the Dead | Alternative rock, garage rock | Fueled by Ramen | |
| April 15 | Soilent Green | Inevitable Collapse in the Presence of Conviction | Sludge metal, grindcore | Metal Blade | |
| April 15 | Thrice | The Alchemy Index Vols. III & IV | Atmospheric rock, folk, roots rock | Vagrant | |
| April 18 | Deus | Vantage Point | Indie rock | V2, Cooperative Music | |
| April 18 | Madonna | Hard Candy | Dance-pop | Warner Bros. | |
| April 18 | Whitesnake | Good to Be Bad | Hard rock, blues rock | SPV/Steamhammer, WEA | |
| April 19 | Ashlee Simpson | Bittersweet World | Electronic, pop, rock | Geffen | |
| April 19 | Juliana Hatfield | How to Walk Away | Indie rock | Ye Olde Records | |
| April 21 | Flight of the Conchords | Flight of the Conchords | Comedy rock, anti-folk, alternative rock | Sub Pop | |
| April 21 | Four Tet | Ringer | Electronic | Domino | |
| April 21 | Grave | Dominion VIII | Death metal | Regain | |
| April 21 | Shihad | Beautiful Machine | Alternative rock, electronic rock, post-punk revival | Warner Music | |
| April 22 | Atmosphere | When Life Gives You Lemons, You Paint That Shit Gold | Hip-hop, alternative hip-hop | Rhymesayers | |
| April 22 | Blind Melon | For My Friends | Alternative rock | Adrenaline Music Group | |
| April 22 | Cancer Bats | Hail Destroyer | Hardcore punk, sludge metal, Southern rock | Distort | |
| April 22 | Die Happy | VI | | GUN | |
| April 22 | Dominici | O_{3} A Trilogy - Part 3 | | Inside Out Music | |
| April 22 | Elvis Costello | Momofuku | Alternative rock, roots rock | Lost Highway | |
| April 22 | Éric Lapointe | Ma peau | | | |
| April 22 | Fieldwork | Door | Jazz | Pi | |
| April 22 | Foxboro Hot Tubs | Stop Drop and Roll!!! | Garage rock | Jingle Town, Warner Music | |
| April 22 | Goldfinger | Hello Destiny... | Ska punk, punk rock, pop-punk | SideOneDummy | |
| April 22 | Phil Vassar | Prayer of a Common Man | Country | Universal South | |
| April 22 | Prodigy | H.N.I.C. Pt. 2 | Hip-hop | Voxonic Inc. | |
| April 22 | Story of the Year | The Black Swan | Post-hardcore, alternative metal, melodic hardcore | Epitaph | |
| April 22 | Tantric | The End Begins | Post-grunge, alternative metal | Silent Majority | |
| April 22 | Tokyo Police Club | Elephant Shell | Indie rock, post-punk revival | Saddle Creek | |
| April 22 | Vijay Iyer | Tragicomic | Jazz | Sunnyside | |
| April 22 | The Weepies | Hideaway | Folk-pop | Nettwerk | |
| April 23 | Kalmah | For the Revolution | Melodic death metal, thrash metal | Spinefarm | |
| April 24 | Hadouken! | Music for an Accelerated Culture | New rave, grindie | Atlantic | |
| April 25 | Ayreon | Elected | Progressive metal | Inside Out Music, SPV | |
| April 25 | Def Leppard | Songs from the Sparkle Lounge | Hard rock, glam rock | Island, Universal Music Enterprises | |
| April 25 | DevilDriver | Head on to Heartache | Groove metal | Roadrunner | |
| April 25 | Edenbridge | MyEarthDream | Symphonic metal, gothic metal | Napalm | |
| April 25 | Human Fortress | Eternal Empire | | Massacre | |
| April 25 | Jennifer Paige | Best Kept Secret | Pop, pop rock | SPV | |
| April 25 | Torture Squad | Hellbound | Death metal, thrash metal | Wacken Records | |
| April 25 | Venomous Concept | Poisoned Apple | Grindcore, hardcore punk | Century Media | |
| April 25 | Warrel Dane | Praises to the War Machine | Progressive metal, thrash metal, gothic metal | Century Media | |
| April 26 | Bliss n Eso | Flying Colours | Hip-hop | Illusive Sounds, Liberation Music | |
| April 28 | Deicide | Till Death Do Us Part | Death metal | Earache | |
| April 28 | Earl Klugh | The Spice of Life | Smooth jazz | Koch | |
| April 28 | The Fall | Imperial Wax Solvent | Alternative rock | Sanctuary | |
| April 28 | Mindless Self Indulgence | If | Synth-punk | The End | |
| April 28 | My Dying Bride | An Ode to Woe | Doom metal, gothic metal | Peaceville | |
| April 28 | Portishead | Third | Electronica, experimental rock, psychedelic rock | Island, Mercury | |
| April 28 | The Roots | Rising Down | Hip-hop, hardcore hip-hop | Def Jam | |
| April 28 | Tindersticks | The Hungry Saw | Chamber pop | Beggars Banquet | |
| April 29 | 9th Wonder & Buckshot | The Formula | Hip-hop | Duck Down Music | |
| April 29 | Augustana | Can't Love, Can't Hurt | Rock, roots rock, indie rock | Epic | |
| April 29 | Blue Sky Black Death | Late Night Cinema | | Babygrande | |
| April 29 | The Cab | Whisper War | Pop rock, pop-punk, alternative rock | Decaydance, Fueled by Ramen | |
| April 29 | Forever the Sickest Kids | Underdog Alma Mater | Pop-punk, neon pop punk, power pop | Universal Motown | |
| April 29 | HIM | Digital Versatile Doom | | Sire, Warner Bros. | |
| April 29 | Langhorne Slim | Langhorne Slim | Alternative country | Kemado | |
| April 29 | Lil Mama | VYP (Voice of the Young People) | Hip-hop, dance, R&B | Zomba, Jive | |
| April 29 | Lyfe Jennings | Lyfe Change | R&B, soul, hip-hop | Sony Urban Music, Columbia, Music World | |
| April 29 | Mudcrutch | Mudcrutch | Southern rock, country rock | Reprise | |
| April 29 | New Found Glory | Tip of the Iceberg | Hardcore punk, pop-punk | Bridge 9 | |
| April 29 | Phil Stacey | Phil Stacey | Country | Lyric Street | |
| April 29 | pureNRG | Here We Go Again | Pop, pop rock, power pop | Fervent, Curb, Warner Bros. | |
| April 29 | Puscifer | "V" Is for Viagra. The Remixes | Trip hop, post-industrial | Puscifer Entertainment | |
| April 29 | Run Kid Run | Love at the Core | Pop-punk | Tooth & Nail | |
| April 29 | Santogold | Santogold | New wave, dub, reggae fusion | Downtown, Atlantic | |
| April 29 | Steve Winwood | Nine Lives | Rock, pop, blues | Columbia | |
| April 29 | Testament | The Formation of Damnation | Thrash metal | Nuclear Blast | |
| April 29 | Wednesday 13 | Bloodwork | Horror punk, heavy metal | Wednesday 13 LLC | |
| April 29 | Your Vegas | A Town and Two Cities | Alternative rock | Universal Republic | |
| April 30 | Moonsorrow | Tulimyrsky | Folk metal, black metal | Spinefarm | |

=== May ===
List of albums released in May 2008
Go to: January | February | March | April | May | June | July | August | September | October | November | December | Back to top
| Release date | Artist | Album | Genre | Label | Ref. |
| May 2 | Gemma Hayes | The Hollow of Morning | Alternative rock, folk | GH Music, Second Motion | |
| May 2 | Tiamat | Amanethes | Gothic metal | Nuclear Blast | |
| May 5 | Nine Inch Nails | The Slip | Industrial rock, electro-industrial | The Null Corporation | |
| May 5 | We Are the Physics | We Are the Physics Are OK at Music | Alternative rock | | |
| May 6 | Clay Aiken | On My Way Here | Pop | RCA | |
| May 6 | Firewater | The Golden Hour | Indie rock | Bloodshot | |
| May 6 | From First to Last | From First to Last | Post-hardcore, emo | Suretone, Interscope | |
| May 6 | Gavin DeGraw | Gavin DeGraw | Pop rock | J | |
| May 6 | Hammock | Maybe They Will Sing for Us Tomorrow | Ambient, post-rock | Darla | |
| May 6 | Kayo Dot | Blue Lambency Downward | Avant-rock | Hydra Head | |
| May 6 | Kelli O'Hara | Wonder in the World | Traditional pop | Ghostlight | |
| May 6 | Neil Diamond | Home Before Dark | Country rock | American | |
| May 6 | Russian Circles | Station | Post-rock, post-metal, instrumental rock | Suicide Squeeze, Sargent House | |
| May 6 | Socratic | Spread the Rumors | | Drive-Thru | |
| May 6 | Tim Fite | Fair Ain't Fair | Rock, folk, hip-hop | Anti- | |
| May 8 | No Age | Nouns | Noise pop, experimental pop, punk rock | Sub Pop | |
| May 12 | Dan le Sac vs Scroobius Pip | Angles | Hip-hop, electronic | Sunday Best, Strange Famous | |
| May 12 | Death Cab for Cutie | Narrow Stairs | Alternative rock, indie rock | Atlantic, Barsuk | |
| May 12 | Jason Mraz | We Sing. We Dance. We Steal Things. | Pop, folk, blue-eyed soul | Atlantic | |
| May 12 | No-Man | Schoolyard Ghosts | Art rock | Kscope | |
| May 12 | Pendulum | In Silico | Drum and bass, electronic rock | Earstorm, Warner Bros., Atlantic | |
| May 12 | Prolyphic and Reanimator | The Ugly Truth | Hip-hop | Strange Famous | |
| May 13 | Abysmal Dawn | Programmed to Consume | Death metal | Relapse | |
| May 13 | Cherish | The Truth | R&B | Sho'nuff Records, Capitol | |
| May 13 | Coldworker | Rotting Paradise | Death metal, grindcore | Relapse | |
| May 13 | Dosh | Wolves and Wishes | Post-rock, instrumental hip-hop | Anticon | |
| May 13 | Emmure | The Respect Issue | Deathcore, metalcore | Victory | |
| May 13 | Filter | Anthems for the Damned | Alternative rock, industrial rock | Pulse Records | |
| May 13 | Foxy Brown | Brooklyn's Don Diva | Hip-hop | Black Rose Entertainment, Koch | |
| May 13 | Isobel Campbell & Mark Lanegan | Sunday at Devil Dirt | Indie pop, alternative rock | V2 | |
| May 13 | Keith Sweat | Just Me | | Atco | |
| May 13 | Local H | Twelve Angry Months | Alternative rock | Shout! Factory | |
| May 13 | Michael Schenker Group | In the Midst of Beauty | Hard rock, heavy metal | In-akustik | |
| May 13 | Old 97's | Blame It on Gravity | Alternative country | New West | |
| May 13 | Robert Cray | Live at the BBC | Blues | Vanguard | |
| May 13 | Subtle | Exiting Arm | Hip-hop | Lex | |
| May 13 | Usher | Here I Stand | R&B, hip-hop | LaFace | |
| May 13 | Vetiver | Thing of the Past | Folk rock | Gnomonsong, FatCat | |
| May 13 | Wadada Leo Smith | Tabligh | Jazz | Cuneiform | |
| May 16 | Moonspell | Night Eternal | Gothic metal, melodic death metal, melodic black metal | Steamhammer | |
| May 16 | Scarlett Johansson | Anywhere I Lay My Head | Indie folk, alternative rock, dream pop | Atco | |
| May 16 | The Ting Tings | We Started Nothing | Art pop | Columbia | |
| May 17 | The Dresden Dolls | No, Virginia... | Dark cabaret, alternative rock | Roadrunner | |
| May 19 | Ladytron | Velocifero | Electronic rock, synth-pop, shoegaze | Nettwerk | |
| May 19 | Mick Hucknall | Tribute to Bobby | Blues, jazz, pop | Simply Red | |
| May 19 | Opeth | Watershed | Progressive death metal | Roadrunner | |
| May 20 | 3 Doors Down | 3 Doors Down | Alternative rock, hard rock | Universal Republic | |
| May 20 | Black Lungs | Send Flowers | Alternative rock, folk punk | Dine Alone | |
| May 20 | Bonnie "Prince" Billy | Lie Down in the Light | Indie folk, alternative country | Drag City | |
| May 20 | Bun B | II Trill | Hip-hop | Rap-A-Lot, Asylum | |
| May 20 | Donna Summer | Crayons | R&B | Burgundy | |
| May 20 | Free Kitten | Inherit | Indie rock | Ecstatic Peace! | |
| May 20 | Islands | Arm's Way | | Anti- | |
| May 20 | Jesse McCartney | Departure | Pop, dance-pop, electropop | Hollywood | |
| May 20 | Julianne Hough | Julianne Hough | Country | Mercury Nashville | |
| May 20 | Killah Priest | Behind the Stained Glass | Hip-hop | Good Hands | |
| May 20 | Sam Roberts | Love at the End of the World | Rock | Secret Brain, Universal Music Canada | |
| May 21 | Nightmare | Killer Show | Progressive rock, alternative rock | VAP | |
| May 23 | Kataklysm | Prevail | Death metal, melodic death metal | Nuclear Blast | |
| May 24 | The Herd | Summerland | Australian hip-hop | Elefant Traks | |
| May 26 | Cryptopsy | The Unspoken King | Deathcore | Century Media | |
| May 26 | Ihsahn | angL | Progressive metal, black metal | Mnemosyne, Candlelight | |
| May 26 | Shai Hulud | Misanthropy Pure | Hardcore punk | Metal Blade | |
| May 26 | Terror | The Damned, the Shamed | Hardcore | Century Media | |
| May 26 | Various artists | Sex and the City: Original Motion Picture Soundtrack | Pop, rock, R&B | New Line | |
| May 27 | Al Green | Lay It Down | Soul | Blue Note | |
| May 27 | Cyndi Lauper | Bring Ya to the Brink | Dance-pop | Epic | |
| May 27 | Ellen Allien | Sool | Minimal techno, IDM | BPitch Control | |
| May 27 | H_{2}O | Nothing to Prove | Punk rock | Bridge 9 | |
| May 27 | Health | Health//Disco | Noise rock, dance-punk | Lovepump United Records | |
| May 27 | John Hiatt | Same Old Man | Rock | New West | |
| May 27 | TobyMac | Alive and Transported | Christian hip-hop, Christian rock | ForeFront | |
| May 27 | Underoath | Survive, Kaleidoscope | Metalcore | Tooth & Nail | |
| May 28 | Vader | XXV | Death metal, thrash metal | Regain | |
| May 29 | Kalomira | Secret Combination: The Album | R&B, pop, electropop | Heaven Music | |
| May 30 | Alanis Morissette | Flavors of Entanglement | Pop rock, alternative rock, electronic rock | Maverick, Warner Bros. | |
| May 30 | Communic | Payment of Existence | Progressive metal, power metal | Nuclear Blast | |
| May 30 | Hollenthon | Opus Magnum | Symphonic death metal | Napalm | |
| May 30 | Pyramaze | Immortal | Power metal, progressive metal | Locomotive Music | |
| May 30 | Sabaton | The Art of War | Power metal | Black Lodge | |
| May 30 | Týr | Land | Viking metal, folk metal, progressive metal | Napalm | |
| May 30 | Wale | The Mixtape About Nothing | Alternative hip-hop | 10.Deep | |

=== June ===
List of albums released in June 2008
Go to: January | February | March | April | May | June | July | August | September | October | November | December | Back to top
| Release date | Artist | Album | Genre | Label | Ref. |
| June 1 | Herbert | The Shakes | Electronic | Accidental | |
| June 2 | Aimee Mann | @#%&*! Smilers | | SuperEgo | |
| June 2 | Johnny Foreigner | Waited Up 'til It Was Light | Indie rock, post-punk, math rock | Best Before, Nettwerk | |
| June 2 | Satyricon | My Skin Is Cold | Black metal | Roadrunner | |
| June 2 | Uriah Heep | Wake the Sleeper | Hard rock | Sanctuary | |
| June 2 | The Zutons | You Can Do Anything | Indie rock | Deltasonic | |
| June 3 | Alesana | Where Myth Fades to Legend | Post-hardcore, screamo, emo | Fearless | |
| June 3 | Ashanti | The Declaration | R&B | The Inc., Universal Motown | |
| June 3 | Disturbed | Indestructible | Heavy metal, alternative metal, hard rock | Reprise | |
| June 3 | Dr. John and the Lower 911 | City That Care Forgot | R&B, blues rock | 429, Cooking Vinyl | |
| June 3 | Fleet Foxes | Fleet Foxes | Indie folk, chamber pop, folk rock | Sub Pop, Bella Union | |
| June 3 | Gavin Rossdale | Wanderlust | Rock | Interscope | |
| June 3 | Jewel | Perfectly Clear | Country | Valory | |
| June 3 | Journey | Revelation | Hard rock, arena rock | Nomota LLC | |
| June 3 | Sam Phillips | Don't Do Anything | Pop, rock | Nonesuch | |
| June 3 | Shearwater | Rook | Indie rock | Matador | |
| June 3 | Weezer | Weezer (Red Album) | Alternative rock, power pop | DGC | |
| June 6 | Amaseffer | Slaves for Life | Progressive metal, folk metal | Inside Out Music | |
| June 6 | Electric President | Sleep Well | Electronic | Morr Music | |
| June 9 | Daedelus | Love to Make Music To | Electronic | Ninja Tune | |
| June 9 | The Fratellis | Here We Stand | Rock | Island | |
| June 9 | The Twilight Sad | Here, It Never Snowed. Afterwards It Did | Indie rock | FatCat | |
| June 10 | The Awkward Stage | Slimming Mirrors, Flattering Lights | Indie pop | Mint | |
| June 10 | Emmylou Harris | All I Intended to Be | Country, folk, Americana | Nonesuch | |
| June 10 | Jakob Dylan | Seeing Things | Alternative rock, folk rock | Columbia | |
| June 10 | Jon Foreman | Summer | Acoustic | Lowercase People, Credential | |
| June 10 | KRS-One | Maximum Strength | Hip-hop | Koch | |
| June 10 | Lauren Harris | Calm Before the Storm | Hard rock | Demolition DR2 Records | |
| June 10 | Lil Wayne | Tha Carter III | Southern hip-hop, pop rap | Cash Money, Universal Motown, Young Money | |
| June 10 | Montgomery Gentry | Back When I Knew It All | Country | Columbia Nashville | |
| June 10 | My Morning Jacket | Evil Urges | Indie rock, neo-psychedelia | ATO | |
| June 10 | N.E.R.D. | Seeing Sounds | Hip-hop, alternative rock | Star Trak, Interscope | |
| June 10 | Omar Rodríguez-López | Omar Rodriguez Lopez & Jeremy Michael Ward | | Infrasonic Sound | |
| June 10 | Plies | Definition of Real | Southern hip-hop, gangsta rap | Big Gates, Slip-n-Slide, Atlantic | |
| June 10 | Rage | Carved in Stone | Power metal, heavy metal | Nuclear Blast | |
| June 10 | Sloan | Parallel Play | Rock, power pop | Murderecords, Yep Roc | |
| June 10 | Tyga | No Introduction | Pop-rap | Decaydance | |
| June 10 | Walter Becker | Circus Money | | 5 Over 12 | |
| June 11 | Helena Paparizou | Vrisko To Logo Na Zo | Pop, pop rock, electronica | Sony BMG Greece | |
| June 11 | Ira Losco | Fortune Teller | Rock, Alternative rock | None Records | |
| June 11 | The Offspring | Rise and Fall, Rage and Grace | Punk rock | Columbia | |
| June 12 | Coldplay | Viva la Vida or Death and All His Friends | Alternative rock, art rock, pop rock | Parlophone | |
| June 16 | Feeder | Silent Cry | Alternative rock, post-grunge, power pop | Echo | |
| June 16 | Hot Club de Paris | Live at Dead Lake | Indie rock, math rock | Moshi Moshi | |
| June 16 | Judas Priest | Nostradamus | Heavy metal, symphonic metal | Epic | |
| June 17 | 2 Pistols | Death Before Dishonor | Hip-hop | Blood Money Union, Universal Republic | |
| June 17 | Blood Raw | My Life: The True Testimony | Southern hip-hop, gangsta rap | Corporate Thugz, Def Jam | |
| June 17 | Jim Jones & ByrdGang | M.O.B.: The Album | Hip-hop | Asylum | |
| June 17 | Katy Perry | One of the Boys | Pop rock, soft rock, power pop | Capitol | |
| June 17 | The Notwist | The Devil, You + Me | Indie rock | Big Store, City Slang | |
| June 17 | Reggie and the Full Effect | Last Stop: Crappy Town | Alternative rock, post-hardcore, metalcore | Vagrant | |
| June 17 | Silver Jews | Lookout Mountain, Lookout Sea | | Drag City | |
| June 17 | Teddy Thompson | A Piece of What You Need | Folk, alternative country | Verve Forecast | |
| June 17 | Tilly and the Wall | o | Indie pop, indie rock | Team Love | |
| June 17 | Wolf Parade | At Mount Zoomer | Indie rock | Sub Pop | |
| June 19 | Girl Talk | Feed the Animals | Mashup, plunderphonics | Illegal Art | |
| June 20 | Scar Symmetry | Holographic Universe | Melodic death metal, progressive metal | Nuclear Blast | |
| June 20 | Sigur Rós | Með suð í eyrum við spilum endalaust | Post-rock, dream pop, indie rock | EMI, XL | |
| June 23 | The Features | Some Kind of Salvation | Southern rock, indie rock | 429 | |
| June 23 | Gorgoroth | True Norwegian Black Metal – Live in Grieghallen | Black metal | Regain | |
| June 23 | White Denim | Workout Holiday | Garage rock, experimental rock, dub | Full Time Hobby | |
| June 24 | Amos Lee | Last Days at the Lodge | Folk, neo soul | Blue Note | |
| June 24 | Beneath the Sky | The Day the Music Died | Metalcore, deathcore | Victory | |
| June 24 | Carnifex | The Diseased and the Poisoned | Deathcore | Victory | |
| June 24 | Cute Is What We Aim For | Rotation | Pop-punk | Fueled by Ramen | |
| June 24 | Danny! | And I Love H.E.R.: Original Motion Picture Soundtrack | | Badenov Records, 1911 Music | |
| June 24 | Dwele | Sketches of a Man | R&B | Koch | |
| June 24 | Elliott Brood | Mountain Meadows | Alternative country | Six Shooter | |
| June 24 | G. Love & Special Sauce | Superhero Brother | | Brushfire | |
| June 24 | Kara Grainger | Grand and Green River | Blues rock, soul music, country blues | Craving Records | |
| June 24 | Kutless | To Know That You're Alive | Christian rock | BEC | |
| June 24 | Less Than Jake | GNV FLA | Ska punk, pop-punk | Sleep It Off Records | |
| June 24 | Mötley Crüe | Saints of Los Angeles | Heavy metal, glam metal | Mötley, Eleven Seven Music | |
| June 24 | Reckless Kelly | Bulletproof | | Yep Roc | |
| June 24 | RZA as Bobby Digital | Digi Snacks | Hip-hop | Koch | |
| June 24 | Shinedown | The Sound of Madness | Hard rock, alternative rock, post-grunge | Atlantic | |
| June 24 | Thalía | Lunada | Latin pop | EMI Latin | |
| June 24 | Thomas Newman | WALL-E | | Walt Disney | |
| June 24 | Three 6 Mafia | Last 2 Walk | Hip-hop | Columbia, Hypnotize Minds | |
| June 24 | Vanessa Hudgens | Identified | | Hollywood | |
| June 24 | Various artists | Big Blue Ball | World | Real World, Rykodisc | |
| June 24 | Vast Aire | Dueces Wild | Hip-hop | One Records, Gracie Productions | |
| June 30 | The Subways | All or Nothing | Alternative rock, post-grunge, post-punk revival | Warner Bros. | |

== Third quarter ==
=== July ===
List of albums released in July 2008
Go to: January | February | March | April | May | June | July | August | September | October | November | December | Back to top
| Release date | Artist | Album | Genre | Label | Ref. |
| July 1 | Alkaline Trio | Agony & Irony | Pop-punk, pop rock, hard rock | Epic | |
| July 1 | G-Unit | T·O·S (Terminate on Sight) | Hip-hop, gangsta rap | G-Unit, Interscope | |
| July 1 | Jay Brannan | Goddamned | | Great Depression, Nettwerk | |
| July 1 | Little Feat | Join the Band | | 429 Records | |
| July 1 | My Chemical Romance | The Black Parade Is Dead! | Alternative rock, emo, pop-punk | Reprise | |
| July 1 | Relient K | The Bird and the Bee Sides | Rock, pop-punk, alternative rock | Gotee | |
| July 1 | Tech N9ne | Killer | Hip-hop, horrorcore, gangsta rap | Strange Music | |
| July 7 | Black Kids | Partie Traumatic | Indie rock | Almost Gold, Columbia | |
| July 7 | Brett Anderson | Wilderness | Indie rock | BA Songs | |
| July 7 | Patti Smith and Kevin Shields | The Coral Sea | Spoken word | PASK | |
| July 7 | Tricky | Knowle West Boy | | Domino | |
| July 7 | Wire | Object 47 | Post-punk, experimental rock, dance-rock | Pinkflag | |
| July 8 | 3OH!3 | Want | Electropop, crunkcore, electro-hop | Photo Finish | |
| July 8 | The Baseball Project | Volume 1: Frozen Ropes and Dying Quails | Rock | Yep Roc | |
| July 8 | Beck | Modern Guilt | Psychedelic rock, avant-pop | DGC, XL | |
| July 8 | Hit the Lights | Skip School, Start Fights | Pop-punk | Triple Crown | |
| July 8 | Jean Grae | Jeanius | Hip-hop | Blacksmith | |
| July 8 | Kerli | Love Is Dead | Alternative rock, pop, rock | Island | |
| July 8 | Killer Mike | I Pledge Allegiance to the Grind II | Hip-hop | Grind Time Official, SMC | |
| July 8 | The Maine | Can't Stop Won't Stop | Pop-punk, pop rock | Fearless | |
| July 8 | Melvins | Nude with Boots | Sludge metal | Ipecac | |
| July 8 | Ratatat | LP3 | Experimental rock, neo-psychedelia, electronica | XL | |
| July 8 | Sixpence None the Richer | My Dear Machine | Alternative rock, indie pop | | |
| July 8 | T.H.U.G. Angelz | Welcome to Red Hook Houses | Hip-hop | Babygrande | |
| July 8 | Whitechapel | This Is Exile | Deathcore | Metal Blade | |
| July 8 | Various artists | Mamma Mia! The Movie Soundtrack | Pop | Decca, Polydor | |
| July 8 | Willie Nelson and Wynton Marsalis | Two Men with the Blues | Jazz | Blue Note | |
| July 8 | Women | Women | Indie rock | Flemish Eye, Jagjaguwar | |
| July 9 | Flying Lotus | Los Angeles | Lofi hip-hop | Warp | |
| July 11 | Carla Bruni | Comme si de rien n'était | Folk | Naïve | |
| July 11 | Krallice | Krallice | Black metal | Profound Lore, Gilead Media | |
| July 12 | The Vines | Melodia | Alternative rock, garage rock, post-grunge | Ivy League | |
| July 14 | Basshunter | Now You're Gone – The Album | Eurodance | Hard2Beat, Warner Music Sweden, Ultra | |
| July 15 | David Banner | The Greatest Story Ever Told | Hip-hop, Southern hip-hop | Universal Motown, SRC | |
| July 15 | The Hold Steady | Stay Positive | Indie rock, alternative rock, heartland rock | Vagrant, Rough Trade | |
| July 15 | John Mellencamp | Life, Death, Love and Freedom | Americana, folk rock, roots rock | Hear Music | |
| July 15 | Mirah | The Old Days Feeling | Indie rock, lo-fi | Modern Radio | |
| July 15 | MJG | This Might Be the Day | Hip-hop | 404 Music, MJG Musik | |
| July 15 | Nas | Untitled | Hip-hop, R&B | Def Jam | |
| July 15 | Randy Travis | Around the Bend | Country | Warner Bros. Nashville | |
| July 19 | The Living End | White Noise | Punk rock | Dew Process | |
| July 20 | McFly | Radio:Active | Pop-punk, pop rock | Super | |
| July 21 | CSS | Donkey | Indie rock, synth-pop | Sub Pop, Warner Bros. | |
| July 21 | Primal Scream | Beautiful Future | Alternative rock | B-Unique | |
| July 22 | Buddy Guy | Skin Deep | Chicago blues, electric blues | Silvertone, Jive | |
| July 22 | Candlebox | Into the Sun | Post-grunge | Silent Majority | |
| July 22 | Dr. Dog | Fate | Indie rock, Americana, neo-psychedelia | Park the Van | |
| July 22 | Finch | Finch | Post-hardcore, alternative rock, emo | Finch Music, Inc. | |
| July 22 | Francesca Battistelli | My Paper Heart | CCM, pop rock, jazz | Fervent, Curb | |
| July 22 | Hell Rell | Black Mask, Black Gloves | Hip-hop | Babygrande | |
| July 22 | Khia | Nasti Muzik | Hip-hop | Big Cat | |
| July 22 | Miley Cyrus | Breakout | Pop rock | Hollywood | |
| July 22 | Misery Signals | Controller | Progressive metalcore | Ferret | |
| July 22 | Reks | Grey Hairs | Hip-hop | ShowOff Records | |
| July 22 | Skillz | The Million Dollar Backpack | Hip-hop | Big Kidz Entertainment, Koch | |
| July 22 | Sugarland | Love on the Inside | Country | Mercury Nashville | |
| July 22 | War of Ages | Arise and Conquer | Metalcore, Christian metal | Facedown | |
| July 28 | Ida Maria | Fortress Round My Heart | Indie rock | Mercury, Island Def Jam | |
| July 29 | Alice Cooper | Along Came a Spider | Hard rock, heavy metal | Steamhammer | |
| July 29 | Brazilian Girls | New York City | Alternative dance, downtempo, electronic | Verve | |
| July 29 | Scars on Broadway | Scars on Broadway | Alternative metal, experimental rock | Interscope | |
| July 29 | Third Day | Revelation | Christian rock, Southern rock | Esstential | |
| July 30 | Late of the Pier | Fantasy Black Channel | Dance-punk, electroclash, glam punk | Parlophone | |
| July 30 | Namie Amuro | Best Fiction | Dance-pop, R&B | Avex Trax | |

=== August ===
List of albums released in August 2008
Go to: January | February | March | April | May | June | July | August | September | October | November | December | Back to top
| Release date | Artist | Album | Genre | Label | Ref. |
| August 4 | Conor Oberst | Conor Oberst | Folk rock, indie rock, country rock | Merge | |
| August 4 | Lloyd | Lessons in Love | R&B, hip-hop | Young Goldie Music, The Inc., Universal Motown | |
| August 5 | 40 Cal. | Mooga | Hip-hop | Gold Dust | |
| August 5 | The Airborne Toxic Event | The Airborne Toxic Event | Alternative rock, indie rock | Majordomo | |
| August 5 | Anthony Green | Avalon | | Photo Finish | |
| August 5 | Apollo Sunshine | Shall Noise Upon | Indie rock | Headless Heroes | |
| August 5 | Darker My Love | 2 | | Dangerbird | |
| August 5 | The Faint | Fasciinatiion | Indie rock, new wave, dance-punk | | |
| August 5 | Hawthorne Heights | Fragile Future | Emo, alternative rock, pop-punk | Victory | |
| August 5 | Heidi Newfield | What Am I Waiting For | Country | Curb | |
| August 5 | Jamey Johnson | That Lonesome Song | Country | Mercury Nashville | |
| August 5 | Keith Anderson | C'mon! | Country | Columbia Nashville | |
| August 5 | Nappy Roots | The Humdinger | Hip-hop | Nappy Roots Entertainment Group | |
| August 5 | Norma Jean | The Anti Mother | Metalcore, post-hardcore | Solid State | |
| August 5 | Oneida | Preteen Weaponry | | Jagjaguwar | |
| August 5 | Outlawz | We Want In: The Street LP | Gangsta rap, hardcore hip-hop | Gold Dust, 1Nation Entertainment | |
| August 5 | Randy Newman | Harps and Angels | Jazz, soul | Nonesuch | |
| August 5 | Trapt | Only Through the Pain | Hard rock, post-grunge, alternative rock | Eleven Seven | |
| August 9 | Pivot | O Soundtrack My Heart | Math rock, electronic rock, post-rock | Warp | |
| August 11 | Noah and the Whale | Peaceful, the World Lays Me Down | Indie folk, indie rock | Mercury | |
| August 12 | Daz Dillinger | Only on the Left Side | West Coast hip-hop | D.P.G. Recordz, Fontana Distribution | |
| August 12 | Extreme | Saudades de Rock | Hard rock, funk metal | Fontana, Frontiers | |
| August 12 | Jonas Brothers | A Little Bit Longer | Rock, power pop | Hollywood | |
| August 12 | Michelle Williams | Unexpected | Dance-pop, R&B, electronica | Columbia, Music World | |
| August 12 | Yung Berg | Look What You Made Me | Hip-hop | Koch, Epic | |
| August 12 | Zach Hill | Astrological Straits | Rock | Anticon, Ipecac | |
| August 13 | Black Stone Cherry | Folklore and Superstition | Hard rock, Southern rock, alternative metal | Roadrunner | |
| August 18 | David Byrne and Brian Eno | Everything That Happens Will Happen Today | Electronic, folktronica, gospel | Todo Mundo | |
| August 18 | Stereolab | Chemical Chords | Indie pop, lounge | 4AD, Duophonic | |
| August 19 | The Acacia Strain | Continent | Metalcore, deathcore | Prosthetic | |
| August 19 | The Academy Is... | Fast Times at Barrington High | Pop-punk, power pop, alternative rock | Fueled by Ramen, Decaydance | |
| August 19 | David Byrne | Big Love: Hymnal | Hymn | Todo Mundo | |
| August 19 | Deerhunter | Microcastle | Shoegaze, indie pop, baroque pop | Kranky, 4AD | |
| August 19 | The Fiery Furnaces | Remember | Indie rock | Thrill Jockey | |
| August 19 | The Gaslight Anthem | The '59 Sound | Punk rock | SideOneDummy | |
| August 19 | GZA | Pro Tools | Hip-hop | Babygrande | |
| August 19 | Heavy Heavy Low Low | Turtle Nipple and the Toxic Shock | | Ferret Music | |
| August 19 | Hotel Lights | Firecracker People | | Bar/None | |
| August 19 | The Human Abstract | Midheaven | Progressive metal | Hopeless | |
| August 19 | Ice Cube | Raw Footage | West Coast hip-hop, gangsta rap, political hip-hop | Lench Mob, EMI | |
| August 19 | Jaguar Love | Take Me to the Sea | Art punk | Matador | |
| August 19 | Lady Gaga | The Fame | Electropop, synth-pop, dance-pop | Interscope | |
| August 19 | Ra Ra Riot | The Rhumb Line | Indie rock | Barsuk | |
| August 19 | The Showdown | Back Breaker | Christian metal, thrash metal, hardcore punk | Solid State | |
| August 19 | Shwayze | Shwayze | Alternative hip-hop | Suretone | |
| August 19 | Staind | The Illusion of Progress | Post-grunge, alternative rock | Flip, Atlantic, Roadrunner | |
| August 19 | The Stills | Oceans Will Rise | Indie rock | Arts & Crafts | |
| August 19 | Todd Snider | Peace Queer | | Aimless Records | |
| August 21 | Bloc Party | Intimacy | Indie rock, alternative dance | Wichita | |
| August 25 | Mylène Farmer | Point de suture | Dance, synth-pop, pop rock | Polydor | |
| August 25 | The Verve | Forth | Neo-psychedelia, alternative rock, dream pop | Parlophone, EMI | |
| August 26 | The 88 | Not Only... But Also | | Island | |
| August 26 | Alias | Resurgam | Instrumental hip-hop | Anticon | |
| August 26 | B. B. King | One Kind Favor | | Geffen | |
| August 26 | Blues Traveler | North Hollywood Shootout | Rock, psychedelic rock | Verve Forecast | |
| August 26 | Delta Spirit | Ode to Sunshine | Indie rock, indie folk, folk rock | Rounder | |
| August 26 | DragonForce | Ultra Beatdown | Power metal | Roadrunner, Spinefarm | |
| August 26 | Esham | Sacrificial Lambz | | Gothom | |
| August 26 | The Game | LAX | West coast hip-hop, gangsta rap, hardcore hip-hop | Geffen | |
| August 26 | Jimmy Wayne | Do You Believe Me Now | Country | Valory | |
| August 26 | Motörhead | Motörizer | Heavy metal | Steamhammer | |
| August 26 | Remedy Drive | Daylight Is Coming | Christian rock | Word | |
| August 26 | Slipknot | All Hope Is Gone | Groove metal | Roadrunner | |
| August 26 | Solange | Sol-Angel and the Hadley St. Dreams | R&B, psychedelic soul, electronica | Geffen, Music World | |
| August 26 | V.I.C. | Beast | Southern hip-hop | Warner Bros., Reprise | |
| August 26 | Ying Yang Twins | The Official Work | Southern hip-hop | BCD Music Group, Fontana | |

=== September ===
List of albums released in September 2008
Go to: January | February | March | April | May | June | July | August | September | October | November | December | Back to top
| Release date | Artist | Album | Genre | Label | Ref. |
| September 1 | James Yorkston | When the Haar Rolls In | Folk | Domino | |
| September 1 | Roots Manuva | Slime & Reason | Hip-hop | Big Dada | |
| September 2 | Brian Wilson | That Lucky Old Sun | Art pop | Capitol | |
| September 2 | Deadmau5 | Random Album Title | Progressive house, electro house, ambient house | Mau5trap, Ultra, Ministry of Sound | |
| September 2 | Donnie Klang | Just a Rolling Stone | R&B, dance-pop | Bad Boy, Atlantic | |
| September 2 | Hollywood Undead | Swan Songs | Rap rock, nu metal | A&M Octone, Polydor | |
| September 2 | Jefferson Starship | Jefferson's Tree of Liberty | Folk rock | The Lab Records, Varèse Sarabande | |
| September 2 | New Kids on the Block | The Block | Pop, dance-pop, R&B | Interscope | |
| September 2 | Terrence Howard | Shine Through It | | Sony Music | |
| September 2 | Underoath | Lost in the Sound of Separation | Metalcore, post-hardcore, screamo | Solid State, Tooth & Nail | |
| September 2 | Young Jeezy | The Recession | Hip-hop | CTE, Def Jam | |
| September 8 | David Holmes | The Holy Pictures | | Go! Beat | |
| September 8 | Glasvegas | Glasvegas | Indie rock, noise pop | Columbia | |
| September 8 | Iced Earth | The Crucible of Man: Something Wicked Part 2 | Power metal, heavy metal, thrash metal | SPV GmbH | |
| September 8 | Julian Cope | Black Sheep | Rock | Head Heritage | |
| September 8 | Marius Neset | Suite for the Seven Mountains | Jazz | Edition, Calibrated Records | |
| September 8 | Metronomy | Nights Out | Electronica, synth-pop | Because | |
| September 9 | Calexico | Carried to Dust | | Quarterstick Records | |
| September 9 | Chad VanGaalen | Soft Airplane | Indie rock, folk | Flemish Eye, Sub Pop | |
| September 9 | Fujiya & Miyagi | Lightbulbs | | Full Time Hobby, Deaf Dumb & Blind | |
| September 9 | Gym Class Heroes | The Quilt | Alternative hip-hop, alternative rock, alternative R&B | Decaydance, Fueled by Ramen | |
| September 9 | Jessica Simpson | Do You Know | Country pop | Epic, Columbia Nashville | |
| September 9 | Joan Osborne | Little Wild One | Rock, R&B | Saguaro Road Records | |
| September 9 | Joshua Radin | Simple Times | Acoustic, folk rock | Mom + Pop | |
| September 9 | Kardinal Offishall | Not 4 Sale | Hip-hop | KonLive, Geffen, Black Jays | |
| September 9 | LL Cool J | Exit 13 | | Def Jam | |
| September 9 | The New Year | The New Year | Indie rock | Touch and Go | |
| September 9 | Novillero | A Little Tradition | Indie rock, pop | Mint | |
| September 9 | Okkervil River | The Stand Ins | Indie rock | Jagjaguwar | |
| September 9 | People in Planes | Beyond The Horizon | Alternative rock, indie rock, hard rock | Wind-up | |
| September 9 | The Sound of Animals Fighting | The Ocean and the Sun | Experimental rock, progressive rock | Epitaph | |
| September 10 | Tigers Jaw | Tigers Jaw | Indie rock, emo, Pop-punk | Prison Jazz Records | |
| September 12 | Julien Clerc | Où s'en vont les avions? | Pop | Virgin Music | |
| September 12 | Metallica | Death Magnetic | Heavy metal | Warner Bros. | |
| September 15 | Lindsey Buckingham | Gift of Screws | Rock | Reprise | |
| September 15 | Queen + Paul Rodgers | The Cosmos Rocks | Rock | Parlophone, Hollywood | |
| September 15 | The Streets | Everything Is Borrowed | | 679, Vice | |
| September 16 | All Shall Perish | Awaken the Dreamers | Deathcore, metalcore | Nuclear Blast | |
| September 16 | All That Remains | Overcome | Melodic metalcore | Prosthetic | |
| September 16 | Amanda Palmer | Who Killed Amanda Palmer | Dark cabaret, alternative rock | Roadrunner | |
| September 16 | Breathe Carolina | It's Classy, Not Classic | Synth-pop, power pop | Rise | |
| September 16 | Buckcherry | Black Butterfly | Hard rock | Eleven Seven, Atlantic | |
| September 16 | Darius Rucker | Learn to Live | Country | Capitol Nashville | |
| September 16 | Dead Confederate | Wrecking Ball | Alternative rock, psychedelic rock, alternative country | The Artists Organization | |
| September 16 | DJ Khaled | We Global | Hip-hop | We the Best, Terror Squad, Koch | |
| September 16 | DJ Muggs and Planet Asia | Pain Language | Hip-hop | Gold Dust Media | |
| September 16 | Dressy Bessy | Holler and Stomp | | | |
| September 16 | FemBots | Calling Out | Indie rock | Weewerk | |
| September 16 | Ill Bill | The Hour of Reprisal | Hardcore hip-hop | Uncle Howie Records, Fat Beats Records | |
| September 16 | Jem | Down to Earth | Trip hop | ATO | |
| September 16 | Kristy Lee Cook | Why Wait | Country | Arista Nashville | |
| September 16 | Ne-Yo | Year of the Gentleman | R&B, pop | Def Jam | |
| September 16 | Nelly | Brass Knuckles | Hip-hop | Universal Motown | |
| September 16 | Portugal. The Man | Censored Colors | Psychedelic rock | Equal Vision | |
| September 16 | Raphael Saadiq | The Way I See It | Soul | Columbia | |
| September 16 | Taproot | Our Long Road Home | Alternative metal | Velvet Hammer Music | |
| September 16 | TV on the Radio | Dear Science | Indie rock, art rock, funk | Interscope, DGC, Touch and Go | |
| September 17 | Amon Amarth | Twilight of the Thunder God | Melodic death metal | Metal Blade | |
| September 17 | Ben Folds | Way to Normal | Alternative rock | Epic | |
| September 17 | Europe | Almost Unplugged | Acoustic, rock | Hell&Back | |
| September 17 | The Haunted | Versus | Thrash metal, melodic death metal, groove metal | Century Media | |
| September 19 | Kings of Leon | Only by the Night | Alternative rock, pop rock, Southern rock | RCA | |
| September 19 | Ladyhawke | Ladyhawke | New wave, synth-pop, indie rock | Modular | |
| September 19 | The Pussycat Dolls | Doll Domination | Pop, R&B | Interscope | |
| September 20 | Jenny Lewis | Acid Tongue | Indie rock, alternative country | Warner Bros., Rough Trade | |
| September 21 | Buraka Som Sistema | Black Diamond | Electro, kuduro, breakbeat | Fabric, Sony BMG | |
| September 22 | Bellowhead | Matachin | English folk | Navigator Records | |
| September 22 | David Gilmour | Live in Gdańsk | Progressive rock | EMI | |
| September 22 | Mogwai | The Hawk Is Howling | Post-rock, instrumental rock | Wall of Sound, Play It Again Sam, Matador | |
| September 22 | Sunn O))) | Dømkirke | Drone doom, ambient | Southern Lord | |
| September 22 | Zoe Rahman | Where Rivers Meet | Jazz | Manushi Records | |
| September 23 | All Girl Summer Fun Band | Looking into It | Indie rock, indie pop | AGSFB Music | |
| September 23 | Astronautalis | Pomegranate | Hip-hop | Eyeball | |
| September 23 | Blitzen Trapper | Furr | Alternative country | Sub Pop | |
| September 23 | Chris Brokaw | Canaris | Alternative rock, post-rock, acoustic rock | Capitan Records | |
| September 23 | Cold War Kids | Loyalty to Loyalty | Indie rock, blues rock | Downtown, V2 | |
| September 23 | Les Cowboys Fringants | L'expédition | Alternative rock | La Tribu | |
| September 23 | Demi Lovato | Don't Forget | Rock, power pop | Hollywood | |
| September 23 | Dr. Dooom | Dr. Dooom 2 | Hardcore hip-hop, underground hip-hop | Threshold Recordings, Traffic Entertainment Group | |
| September 23 | Estelle | Shine | R&B | Atlantic, Homeschool Records | |
| September 23 | Everlast | Love, War and the Ghost of Whitey Ford | Alternative rock, blues | Martyr Inc. | |
| September 23 | Jackson Browne | Time the Conqueror | Rock | Inside | |
| September 23 | Jazmine Sullivan | Fearless | | J, Arista | |
| September 23 | Koufax | Strugglers | | Doghouse | |
| September 23 | Metal Church | This Present Wasteland | Heavy metal, thrash metal | SPV/Steamhammer | |
| September 23 | Noah23 | Rock Paper Scissors | Hip-hop | Legendary Entertainment, Plague Language | |
| September 23 | Old Crow Medicine Show | Tennessee Pusher | Folk, country | Nettwerk | |
| September 23 | Peter Bjorn and John | Seaside Rock | Indie pop, experimental rock, shoegaze | Almost Gold | |
| September 23 | Plain White T's | Big Bad World | Pop-punk | Hollywood | |
| September 23 | Thievery Corporation | Radio Retaliation | Trip hop, downtempo, electronica | ESL | |
| September 23 | Trivium | Shogun | Thrash metal, metalcore, progressive metal | Roadrunner | |
| September 24 | The Rasmus | Black Roses | Alternative rock, alternative metal, symphonic rock | Playground | |
| September 26 | James Morrison | Songs for You, Truths for Me | Pop rock, soft rock | Polydor | |
| September 26 | Monrose | I Am | | Starwatch, Warner, Cheyenne Records | |
| September 27 | Jennifer Hudson | Jennifer Hudson | R&B | Arista, J | |
| September 27 | Hermitude | Threads | | Elefant Traks | |
| September 27 | Will Young | Let It Go | | 19, RCA, Sony BMG | |
| September 29 | Bring Me the Horizon | Suicide Season | Metalcore | Epitaph | |
| September 29 | Enslaved | Vertebrae | Progressive metal, Viking metal | Indie Recordings, Nuclear Blast | |
| September 29 | Innerpartysystem | Innerpartysystem | Electronic rock | Island, Stolen Transmission | |
| September 29 | Madlib | WLIB AM: King of the Wigflip | Hip-hop | BBE | |
| September 29 | Mercury Rev | Snowflake Midnight | Alternative rock, electronica | V2, Yep Roc | |
| September 29 | Travis | Ode to J. Smith | Alternative rock, indie rock | Fontana | |
| September 30 | Anberlin | New Surrender | Alternative rock | Universal Republic | |
| September 30 | Ani DiFranco | Red Letter Year | Indie rock, folk rock | Righteous Babe | |
| September 30 | Bayside | Shudder | Emo, alternative rock, punk rock | Victory | |
| September 30 | Béla Fleck and the Flecktones | Jingle All the Way | Jazz fusion, Christmas | Rounder | |
| September 30 | Big Kuntry King | My Turn to Eat | Southern hip-hop | Grand Hustle, Atlantic | |
| September 30 | Bleeding Through | Declaration | Metalcore, symphonic black metal | Trustkill | |
| September 30 | Blue Sky Black Death and Jean Grae | The Evil Jeanius | Hip-hop | Babygrande | |
| September 30 | Dear and the Headlights | Drunk Like Bible Times | Indie rock | Equal Vision | |
| September 30 | Dem Franchize Boyz | Our World, Our Way | Crunk, snap, Southern hip-hop | Koch | |
| September 30 | Energy | Invasions of the Mind | Hardcore punk | Bridge Nine | |
| September 30 | In This Moment | The Dream | Alternative metal, hard rock, alternative rock | Century Media | |
| September 30 | Jack's Mannequin | The Glass Passenger | Power pop | Sire, Warner Bros. | |
| September 30 | Kellie Pickler | Kellie Pickler | Country | BNA | |
| September 30 | Lecrae | Rebel | Christian hip-hop, dirty south, gangsta rap | Reach | |
| September 30 | Misery Index | Traitors | Death metal, grindcore | Relapse | |
| September 30 | Murs | Murs for President | Hip-hop | Warner Bros. | |
| September 30 | The Nightwatchman | The Fabled City | Folk rock, acoustic rock, anti-folk | Epic | |
| September 30 | Restiform Bodies | TV Loves You Back | Alternative hip-hop | Anticon | |
| September 30 | Robin Thicke | Something Else | R&B | Star Trak, Interscope | |
| September 30 | Sen Dog | Diary of a Mad Dog | West Coast hip-hop, gangsta rap | Suburban Noize | |
| September 30 | Termanology | Politics as Usual | Hip-hop | Nature Sounds | |
| September 30 | T.I. | Paper Trail | Hip-hop | Grand Hustle, Atlantic | |
| September 30 | Unk | 2econd Season | Southern rap | Koch | |

== Fourth quarter ==
=== October ===
List of albums released in October 2008
Go to: January | February | March | April | May | June | July | August | September | October | November | December | Back to top
| Release date | Artist | Album | Genre | Label | Ref. |
| October 5 | Sway DaSafo | The Signature LP | British hip-hop, grime | Konvict Muzik, Dcypha Productions | |
| October 6 | Oasis | Dig Out Your Soul | Alternative rock, psychedelic rock, hard rock | Big Brother | |
| October 7 | Aqualung | Words and Music | | Verve Forecast | |
| October 7 | Antony and the Johnsons | Another World | Baroque pop | Secretly Canadian, Rough Trade | |
| October 7 | Casting Crowns | Peace on Earth | Christmas | Reunion | |
| October 7 | Deerhoof | Offend Maggie | Art pop | Kill Rock Stars | |
| October 7 | Fucked Up | The Chemistry of Common Life | Hardcore punk, indie rock | Matador | |
| October 7 | Hey Monday | Hold On Tight | Pop-punk, emo pop | Columbia, Decaydance | |
| October 7 | I Am Ghost | Those We Leave Behind | Post-hardcore, screamo, gothic rock | Epitaph | |
| October 7 | Japanese Motors | Japanese Motors | | Vice | |
| October 7 | Jolie Holland | The Living and the Dead | Alternative country, folk | Anti- | |
| October 7 | Jon McLaughlin | OK Now | Pop rock | Island Def Jam | |
| October 7 | Margot & the Nuclear So and So's | Animal! | | Epic | |
| October 7 | Margot & the Nuclear So and So's | Not Animal | | Epic | |
| October 7 | Marnie Stern | This Is It and I Am It and You Are It and So Is That and He Is It and She Is It and It Is It and That Is That | Experimental rock, indie rock, math rock | Kill Rock Stars | |
| October 7 | Mobile | Tales from the City | Alternative rock | Universal Music | |
| October 7 | Mount Eerie | Lost Wisdom | Indie rock, lo-fi | P. W. Elverum & Sun | |
| October 7 | The Pretenders | Break Up the Concrete | Alternative rock | Shangri-La Music | |
| October 7 | Rachael Yamagata | Elephants...Teeth Sinking into Heart | Alternative rock, blues rock | Warner Bros. | |
| October 7 | Rise Against | Appeal to Reason | Punk rock | DGC, Interscope | |
| October 7 | Senses Fail | Life Is Not a Waiting Room | Post-hardcore, emo, metalcore | Vagrant | |
| October 7 | Tesla | Forever More | Hard rock | Tesla Electric Company Recordings, Rykodisc | |
| October 11 | My Dear Disco | Dancethink | Synth-pop, funk, rock | | |
| October 13 | Gojira | The Way of All Flesh | Technical death metal, progressive metal, groove metal | Listenable, Prosthetic | |
| October 13 | Keane | Perfect Symmetry | Pop rock, alternative rock, synth-pop | Island | |
| October 13 | Yngwie Malmsteen | Perpetual Flame | Neoclassical metal, heavy metal | Rising Force, Koch | |
| October 14 | Billy Currington | Little Bit of Everything | Country | Mercury Nashville | |
| October 14 | Copeland | You Are My Sunshine | | Tooth & Nail | |
| October 14 | Haste the Day | Dreamer | Metalcore | Solid State | |
| October 14 | Houston Calls | The End of an Error | | Drive-Thru | |
| October 14 | Jill Barber | Chances | Jazz, traditional pop | Outside Music | |
| October 14 | John Michael Montgomery | Time Files | Country | Stringtown Records | |
| October 14 | Kenny Chesney | Lucky Old Sun | Country | Blue Chair, BNA | |
| October 14 | Lucinda Williams | Little Honey | | Lost Highway | |
| October 14 | Ray LaMontagne | Gossip in the Grain | Folk, folk rock, folk blues | RCA, BMG, Stone Dwarf | |
| October 14 | Secret Machines | Secret Machines | Space rock | TSM Recordings | |
| October 14 | Sixpence None the Richer | The Dawn of Grace | Alternative rock, indie pop, Christmas | Nettwerk | |
| October 14 | Sleeping in the Aviary | Expensive Vomit in a Cheap Hotel | | Science of Sound | |
| October 14 | Tobacco | Fucked Up Friends | Electronic | Anticon | |
| October 14 | Unearth | The March | Melodic metalcore | Metal Blade | |
| October 15 | +/- | Xs on Your Eyes | Alternative rock, indie rock | Absolutely Kosher, & Records | |
| October 17 | AC/DC | Black Ice | Hard rock | Columbia | |
| October 19 | White Denim | Exposion | Indie rock | Transmission | |
| October 20 | The Bad Plus | For All I Care | Jazz | EmArcy, Heads Up International | |
| October 20 | Caravan Palace | Caravan Palace | Electro swing | Wagram Music | |
| October 20 | Darkthrone | Dark Thrones and Black Flags | Crust punk, black metal | Peaceville | |
| October 20 | The Dears | Missiles | Indie rock | Dangerbird, MapleMusic | |
| October 20 | Kaiser Chiefs | Off with Their Heads | Indie rock | B-Unique, Universal Motown | |
| October 20 | Marillion | Happiness Is the Road | Neo-prog, pop rock, alternative rock | EMI | |
| October 21 | ...And You Will Know Us by the Trail of Dead | Festival Thyme | | Richter Scale, Justice Records | |
| October 21 | Electric Six | Flashy | Rock | Metropolis | |
| October 21 | Escape the Fate | This War Is Ours | Post-hardcore, hard rock, pop screamo | Epitaph | |
| October 21 | Hank Williams III | Damn Right, Rebel Proud | Country, psychobilly | Sidewalk | |
| October 21 | Labelle | Back to Now | Soul, rock | Verve, Universal | |
| October 21 | of Montreal | Skeletal Lamping | Indie pop, psychedelic funk | Polyvinyl | |
| October 21 | See You Next Tuesday | Intervals | | Ferret | |
| October 21 | t.A.T.u. | Vesyolye Ulybki | Eurodance, electronica, electronic rock | Studia Soyuz | |
| October 24 | Anastacia | Heavy Rotation | Pop, soul, R&B | Mercury | |
| October 24 | Darkane | Demonic Art | Melodic death metal, thrash metal | Nuclear Blast, Massacre | |
| October 24 | Lordi | Deadache | Hard rock, heavy metal, shock rock | The End | |
| October 24 | Pink | Funhouse | Pop rock | LaFace | |
| October 24 | Snow Patrol | A Hundred Million Suns | Alternative rock, power pop, indie rock | Fiction, Geffen | |
| October 27 | Los Campesinos! | We Are Beautiful, We Are Doomed | Indie rock, indie pop, noise pop | Wichita, Arts & Crafts | |
| October 27 | Squarepusher | Just a Souvenir | Jazz, electronic, drum and bass | Warp | |
| October 28 | Beneath the Massacre | Dystopia | Technical death metal, deathcore | Prosthetic | |
| October 28 | Black Milk | Tronic | Hip-hop | Fat Beats Records | |
| October 28 | Deerhunter | Weird Era Cont. | Shoegaze, post-punk, noise pop | Kranky, 4AD | |
| October 28 | Eagles of Death Metal | Heart On | Garage rock | Downtown | |
| October 28 | Fear Before | Fear Before | Post-hardcore | Equal Vision | |
| October 28 | John Legend | Evolver | | GOOD Music, Columbia, Sony Music | |
| October 28 | Michael W. Smith | A New Hallelujah | Worship | Reunion | |
| October 28 | Moka Only | Carrots and Eggs | Hip-hop | Urbnet | |
| October 28 | Ryan Adams & the Cardinals | Cardinology | Alternative country, rock | Lost Highway | |
| October 28 | School of Seven Bells | Alpinisms | Electronic, dream pop, shoegaze | Ghostly International | |
| October 28 | Toby Keith | That Don't Make Me a Bad Guy | Country | Show Dog Nashville | |
| October 29 | Agnes | Dance Love Pop | Pop, dance | Roxy | |

=== November ===
List of albums released in November 2008
Go to: January | February | March | April | May | June | July | August | September | October | November | December | Back to top
| Release date | Artist | Album | Genre | Label | Ref. |
| November 3 | Girls Aloud | Out of Control | Pop, electropop | Fascination | |
| November 3 | Grace Jones | Hurricane | Dub, electronica, trip hop | Wall of Sound, PIAS | |
| November 3 | Paschalis Terzis | Mia nihta zoriki | Modern laïkó, pop | Minos EMI | |
| November 3 | Razorlight | Slipway Fires | Indie rock, post-punk revival | Mercury, Vertigo | |
| November 4 | Andrea Bocelli | Incanto | Classical | Decca, Universal | |
| November 4 | Brad Paisley | Play: The Guitar Album | Country | Arista Nashville | |
| November 4 | Harry Connick Jr. | What a Night! A Christmas Album | Jazz, Christmas | Sony Music, Columbia | |
| November 4 | Hinder | Take It to the Limit | Hard rock, post-grunge | Universal Republic | |
| November 4 | honeyhoney | First Rodeo | Americana, alternative country | Ironworks | |
| November 4 | K-the-I??? | Yesterday, Today & Tomorrow | Hip-hop | Mush | |
| November 4 | Little Joy | Little Joy | | Rough Trade | |
| November 4 | Q-Tip | The Renaissance | Progressive hip-hop | Universal Motown | |
| November 4 | Sarah Brightman | A Winter Symphony | Christmas | Manhattan | |
| November 4 | Shiny Toy Guns | Season of Poison | | Universal Motown | |
| November 4 | Thursday and Envy | Thursday / Envy | Post-hardcore, post-rock, screamo | Temporary Residence | |
| November 4 | Vanilla Ice | Vanilla Ice Is Back! | Hip-hop, rap rock | Cleopatra | |
| November 6 | Frontier Ruckus | The Orion Songbook | Folk rock | Quite Scientific Records | |
| November 7 | Enya | And Winter Came... | New-age, Celtic, Christmas | Warner Bros., Reprise | |
| November 10 | David Archuleta | David Archuleta | Pop | Jive, 19 | |
| November 11 | 88-Keys | The Death of Adam | Hip-hop | Decon | |
| November 11 | The Bronx | The Bronx | | Distort | |
| November 11 | Butch Walker | Sycamore Meadows | Alternative rock, folk rock, pop rock | Original Signal | |
| November 11 | Deborah Cox | The Promise | R&B | Image, Deco Recording Group | |
| November 11 | Dir En Grey | Uroboros | Avant-garde metal, heavy metal | Firewall Div., SMEJ, The End | |
| November 11 | The Faceless | Planetary Duality | Technical death metal, progressive metal | Sumerian | |
| November 11 | Jedi Mind Tricks | A History of Violence | Underground hip-hop | Babygrande | |
| November 11 | Laura Pausini | Primavera in anticipo | Pop rock | Warner Music | |
| November 11 | Longwave | Secrets Are Sinister | Indie rock | Original Signal | |
| November 11 | Science Faxtion | Living on Another Frequency | Experimental metal, funk metal, progressive metal | Mascot Music | |
| November 11 | Six Feet Under | Death Rituals | Death metal | Metal Blade | |
| November 11 | T-Pain | Thr33 Ringz | R&B, hip-hop | Nappy Boy, Konvict, Jive | |
| November 11 | Taylor Swift | Fearless | Country pop | Big Machine | |
| November 11 | Tracy Chapman | Our Bright Future | | Elektra | |
| November 11 | Trick Trick | The Villain | Gangsta rap | Time Entertainment LLC, Koch | |
| November 12 | Beyoncé | I Am... Sasha Fierce | Pop, R&B | Columbia, Music World | |
| November 14 | Edguy | Tinnitus Sanctus | Hard rock, progressive metal | Nuclear Blast | |
| November 17 | Dido | Safe Trip Home | Pop, trip hop | Cheeky, Sony Music, RCA | |
| November 17 | The Matthew Herbert Big Band | There's Me and There's You | Electronic, jazz | Accidental, !K7 | |
| November 17 | Mr. Oizo | Lambs Anger | Electronic | Ed Banger | |
| November 18 | Ace Hood | Gutta | Hip-hop | We the Best, Def Jam | |
| November 18 | David Cook | David Cook | Pop rock, alternative rock, post-grunge | RCA | |
| November 18 | The Killers | Day & Age | Dance-rock, new wave, synth-pop | Island | |
| November 18 | Karmakanic | Who's the Boss in the Factory? | Symphonic rock, neo-prog | Inside Out Music | |
| November 18 | Lil' Keke | Loved by Few, Hated by Many | Hip-hop | TF Records, Universal Motown | |
| November 18 | Mudvayne | The New Game | Alternative metal, nu metal, hard rock | Epic | |
| November 18 | Nickelback | Dark Horse | Post-grunge, hard rock, alternative rock | Roadrunner, Atlantic, EMI | |
| November 18 | Sammy Hagar | Cosmic Universal Fashion | Hard rock | Loud & Proud, Roadrunner | |
| November 18 | Shontelle | Shontelligence | R&B | SRC, Motown | |
| November 18 | Slim | Love's Crazy | R&B | Asylum, M3 Productions | |
| November 18 | Third Eye Blind | Red Star | Power pop | MRI Associated | |
| November 18 | Zac Brown Band | The Foundation | Country | Atlantic Nashville, Home Grown, Big Picture | |
| November 21 | Alexis Blue | Hypothetical Situations | | | |
| November 21 | Coldplay | Prospekt's March | Alternative rock | Parlophone | |
| November 21 | Linkin Park | Road to Revolution: Live at Milton Keynes | Nu metal, alternative metal, rap rock | Warner Bros., Machine Shop | |
| November 21 | Ludacris | Theater of the Mind | Hip-hop | Disturbing tha Peace, Def Jam South | |
| November 23 | Guns N' Roses | Chinese Democracy | Hard rock, nu metal | Geffen | |
| November 24 | Alesha Dixon | The Alesha Show | R&B, soul, big band | Asylum, Atlantic | |
| November 24 | Becoming the Archetype | Dichotomy | Progressive death metal | Solid State | |
| November 24 | E-40 | The Ball Street Journal | Hip-hop | BME, Sick Wid It, Warner Bros. | |
| November 24 | The Fireman | Electric Arguments | Experimental pop, alternative rock, neo-psychedelia | One Little Indian, ATO | |
| November 24 | Justice | A Cross the Universe | | Ed Banger, Because, Atlantic | |
| November 24 | Kanye West | 808s & Heartbreak | Electropop, art pop, synth-pop | Def Jam, Roc-A-Fella | |
| November 24 | Kevin Rudolf | In the City | Pop rock, rap rock, electronic rock | Cash Money, Universal Republic | |
| November 24 | Lemar | The Reason | | Epic | |
| November 24 | Rhydian Roberts | Rhydian | Classical, pop | Syco, Sony BMG | |
| November 25 | Cynic | Traced in Air | Progressive metal | Season of Mist | |
| November 25 | Scott Weiland | "Happy" in Galoshes | Alternative rock, neo-psychedelia | Softdrive Records | |
| November 26 | The Soundtrack of Our Lives | Communion | Alternative rock | Akashic Records, Yep Roc | |
| November 28 | Britney Spears | Circus | Pop | Jive | |
| November 29 | Funkoars | The Hangover | Hip-hop | Peepshow Entertainment | |

=== December ===
List of albums released in December 2008
Go to: January | February | March | April | May | June | July | August | September | October | November | December | Back to top
| Release date | Artist | Album | Genre | Label | Ref. |
| December 1 | Akon | Freedom | R&B, hip-hop, dance-pop | Konvict Muzik, UpFront, SRC | |
| December 1 | Glasvegas | A Snowflake Fell (and It Felt Like a Kiss) | Indie rock, Christmas | Columbia | |
| December 1 | Mark Olson & Gary Louris | Ready for the Flood | Alternative country | New West | |
| December 2 | Scarface | Emeritus | Hip-hop | Rap-A-Lot, Asylum, Warner Bros. | |
| December 3 | Sakis Rouvas | Irthes | R&B, urban | Minos EMI | |
| December 5 | Brandy | Human | Pop, R&B | Epic, Knockout, Koch | |
| December 8 | Deathspell Omega | Veritas Diaboli Manet in Aeternum: Chaining the Katechon | Black metal, avant-garde metal | Norma Evangelium Diaboli | |
| December 8 | The Twilight Sad | Killed My Parents and Hit the Road | Indie rock, shoegaze | FatCat | |
| December 9 | Anna Vissi | Apagorevmeno | Pop, contemporary laïkó, rock | Sony BMG Greece, Columbia | |
| December 9 | Avant | Avant | R&B | Capitol | |
| December 9 | Common | Universal Mind Control | Hip-hop | GOOD Music, Geffen | |
| December 9 | EPMD | We Mean Business | Hip-hop | EP Records | |
| December 9 | Maroon 5 | Call and Response: The Remix Album | Dance, hip-hop, R&B | A&M Octone | |
| December 9 | Musiq Soulchild | OnMyRadio | Crunk, neo soul | Atlantic | |
| December 10 | Fall Out Boy | Folie à Deux | Power pop, pop rock, Pop-punk | Island | |
| December 16 | The All-American Rejects | When the World Comes Down | Alternative rock, pop-punk, power pop | DGC, Doghouse, Interscope | |
| December 16 | Anthony Hamilton | The Point of It All | R&B, soul, neo soul | Mister's Music, So So Def, Zomba | |
| December 16 | Jamie Foxx | Intuition | R&B, hip-hop, soul | J | |
| December 16 | Keyshia Cole | A Different Me | R&B | Geffen | |
| December 16 | Plies | Da REAList | Southern hip-hop, dirty rap | Big Gates Records, Slip-n-Slide, Atlantic | |
| December 16 | Saliva | Cinco Diablo | | Island | |
| December 16 | Snoop Dogg | Snoop Dogg Presents Christmas in tha Dogg House | West Coast hip-hop, G-funk, gangsta rap | Doggy Style | |
| December 16 | Soulja Boy Tell 'Em | iSouljaBoyTellem | Southern hip-hop | Stacks on Deck, ColliPark, Interscope | |
| December 30 | Erin McCarley | Love, Save the Empty | Pop rock, alternative rock, acoustic rock | Universal Republic | |
