= 2 (All Girl Summer Fun Band album) =

Studio album by All Girl Summer Fun Band
- Released: April 22, 2003
- Recorded: November, 2002
- Genre: Indie rock, pop
- Length: 29:42
- Label: K Records
- Producer: Jeremy Romagna, All Girl Summer Fun Band

All Girl Summer Fun Band chronology
All Girl Summer Fun Band (2002)	2 (2003)	Looking Into It (2008)

Professional ratings
Review scores
Source	Rating
AllMusic	4/5 stars
Entertainment Weekly	A
Pitchfork	6.9/10

2 is the second album by the All Girl Summer Fun Band, released on the K label in 2003.

== Track listing ==
1. "Dear Mr. and Mrs. Troublemaker"
2. "Down South, 10 Hours, I-5"
3. "Ticking Time Bomb"
4. "Jason Lee"
5. "Grizzly Bear"
6. "Inarticulation"
7. "Daydreaming"
8. "Video Game Heart"
9. "Million Things"
10. "Parallel Park"
11. "The Longer I Wait"
12. "Samantha Secret Agent"
13. "Becky"
14. "Tour Heart Throb"
