= Your Friend, The Atom =

Studio album by We Are the Physics
- Released: 22 October 2012
- Genre: Indie rock

We Are the Physics chronology
We Are the Physics Are OK at Music (2008)	Your Friend, The Atom (2012)

Your Friend, The Atom is the second and last studio album by Scottish indie rock band We Are the Physics. It was released on 22 October 2012 in the UK, and on 30 October 2012 in the US.

== Track listing ==
1. "Go Go Nucleo -> For Science" - 1:40
2. "Applied Robotics" - 2:55
3. "(E.g. Apollo 11)" - 2:27
4. "Napoleon Loves Josephine" - 3:20
5. "And So Now We're Wrestling With The Body Politic" - 3:10
6. "There Is No Cure for the Common Cold So Don't Expect a Cure For Cancer" - 2:50
7. "Goran Ivanisevic" - 3:15
8. "Dildonics" - 2:03
9. "Cluedo" - 2:49
10. "Eat Something" - 3:19
11. "All My Friends Are JPEGs" - 3:34
12. "Junkie Buns" - 2:39
13. "Circuit Babies" - 2:53
14. "Olivia Neutron Bomb" - 4:14
