= All Girl Summer Fun Band (album) =

Studio album by All Girl Summer Fun Band
- Released: February 5, 2002
- Length: 27:00
- Label: K Records

All Girl Summer Fun Band chronology
All Girl Summer Fun Band (2002)	2 (2003)

Professional ratings
Review scores
Source	Rating
AllMusic	4/5 stars
Robert Christgau	(2-star Honorable Mention)
Pitchfork Media	(4.5/10)

All Girl Summer Fun Band is the debut studio album by All Girl Summer Fun Band, released in 2002.

== Track listing ==
All songs written by Kim Baxter, Ari Douangpanya, Kathy Foster, and Jen Sbragia.

1. "Brooklyn Phone Call" – 1:51
2. "Canadian Boyfriend" – 2:35
3. "Car Trouble" – 1:39
4. "Later Operator" – 2:26
5. "Cut Your Hair" – 2:20
6. "Somehow Angels" – 2:42
7. "Theme Song" – 1:08
8. "It's There" – 2:43
9. "Girl No. 3" – 2:50
10. "Stumble Over My" – 1:50
11. "New in Town" – 2:28
12. "Cutie Pie" – 1:28
13. "Cell Phone" – 1:00
