= The Contaminated Void =

Studio album by Coldworker
- Released: November 6, 2006 (worldwide); January 23, 2007 (North America)
- Recorded: June 6–24, 2006
- Genre: Deathgrind
- Length: 39:46
- Label: Relapse Records
- Producer: Dan Swanö

Coldworker chronology
The Contaminated Void (2006)	Pig Destroyer / Coldworker / Antigama (2007)

Professional ratings
Review scores
Source	Rating
AllMusic	3.5/5 stars

The Contaminated Void is the debut album by Swedish deathgrind band Coldworker. It was released on November 13, 2006 in the world (except North America). In North America, it was released on January 23, 2007.

== Track listing ==
No.	Title	Lyrics	Music	Length
1.	"The Interloper"	Jakobson	Alvinzi	2:38
2.	"D.E.A.D."	Bertilsson	Alvinzi/Bertilsson/Jakobson	2:18
3.	"An Unforgiving Season"	Fornbrant	Alvinzi/Bertilsson/Jakobson/Pålsson	2:34
4.	"The Contaminated Void"	Jakobson	Jakobson/Pålsson	2:24
5.	"Death Smiles At Me"	Pålsson	Jakobson/Pålsson	2:14
6.	"A Custom-Made Hell"	Pålsson	Alvinzi	3:01
7.	"Return To Ashes"	Fornbrant	Alvinzi/Jakobson	4:18
8.	"Strain At The Leash"	Pålsson	Alvinzi	2:43
9.	"Flammable"	Fornbrant	Bertilsson/Pålsson	1:58
10.	"Antidote"	Bertilsson	Bertilsson/Jakobson/Pålsson	2:28
11.	"They Crawl Inside Me Uninvited"	Jakobson	Alvinzi	2:53
12.	"Waiting For Buildings To Collapse"	Jakobson	Jakobson	2:57
13.	"Heart Shaped Violence"	Jakobson	Alvinzi/Pålsson	2:58
14.	"Generations Decay"	Fornbrant	Bertilsson/Jakobson/Pålsson	4:13
