= We Are the Physics Are OK at Music =

Studio album by We Are the Physics
- Released: 5 May 2008
- Genre: Alternative; New wave; Indie
- Length: 29:43
- Label: This Is Fake DIY

We Are the Physics chronology
We Are the Physics Are OK at Music (2008)	Your Friend, The Atom (2012)

Singles from We Are the Physics Are OK at Music
- 1. "Less Than Three"; 2. "Fear of Words/This is Vanity"; 3. "You Can Do Athletics, btw"

Professional ratings
Review scores
Source	Rating
Drowned In Sound	link
The Mirror	link
The Independent	link
New Noise	link
Rockfeedback	link

We Are the Physics Are OK at Music is the debut full-length album of We Are the Physics, released via This Is Fake DIY Records on 5 May 2008. The album is to have special "3D artwork": the cd case will fold out into a stage scene, and band members will be available to cut out of card to stick onto the scene. The band say that there will be more figures to cut out and collect on their website in the months following the release of the album.

== Track listing ==
1. Action Action Action Action Action – 0:42
2. Less Than Three – 3:06
3. In The Graveyards – 2:28
4. Bulimia Sisters – 3:29
5. You Can Do Athletics, btw – 3:17
6. Fear of Words – 3:04
7. Pylons & Other Modern Art – 2:56
8. Networking – 1:49
9. This is Vanity – 2:50
10. Duplicates – 3:00
11. Drawing Anarchy Signs On Your Pencil Case Is Redundant – 0:07
12. CYT #1 – 2:55
