= We Are the Physics =

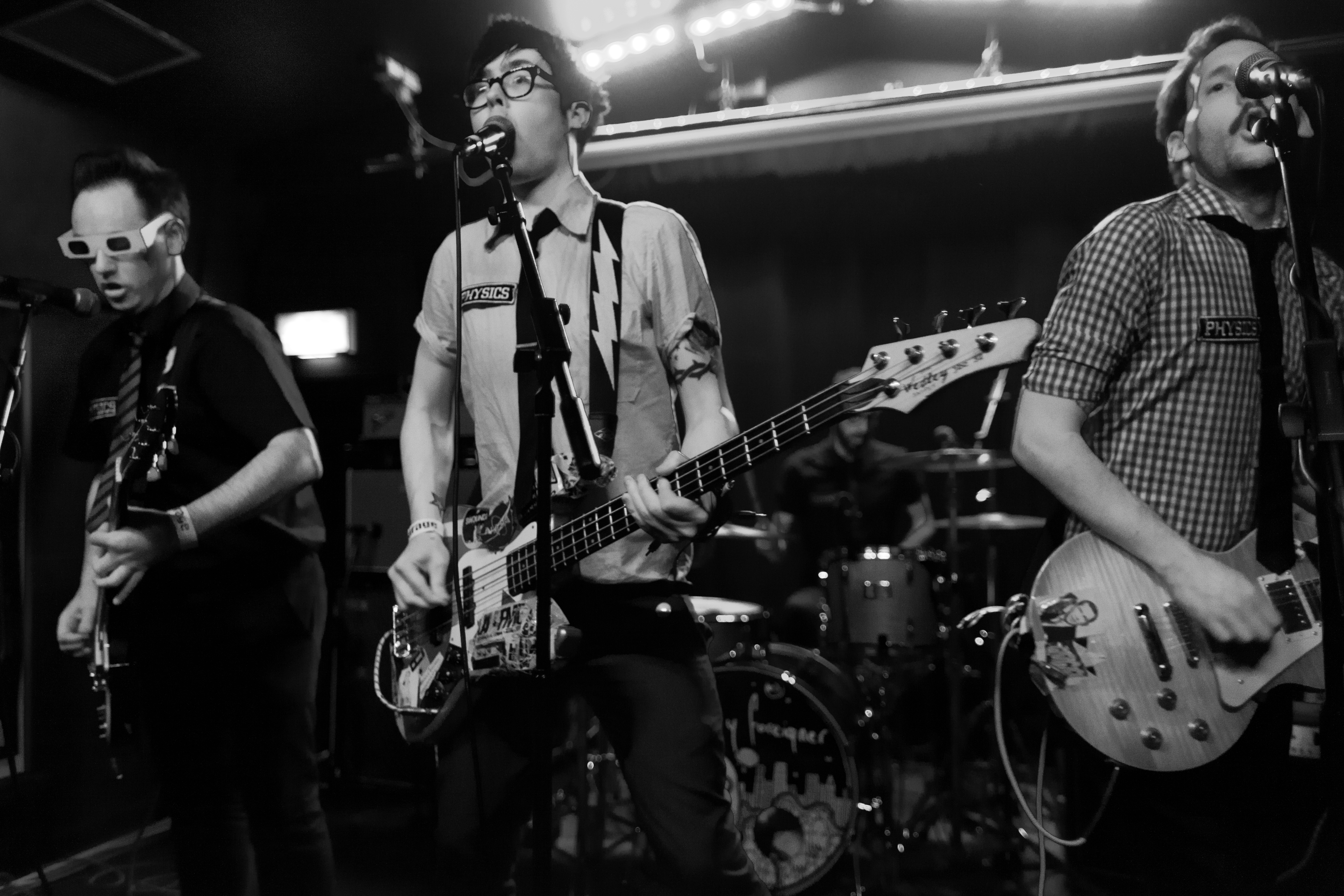
- We Are the Physics performing at London's Garage.

Background information
- Origin: Glasgow, Scotland
- Genres: Noise rock; dance-punk; post-punk revival; indie rock
- Years active: 2005–2013
- Label: This Is Fake DIY Records
- Past members: Michael M; Michael Guitar; Michael Drum; Chris Cris
- Website: www.wearethephysics.com

We Are the Physics was an indie band from Glasgow, Scotland. The band drew influences from new wave, pop, indie, and math rock, and had a "B-movie" aesthetic.

== History ==
We Are the Physics hailed from Glasgow, Scotland, and were founded in 2005. Originally known as We Are the Physics Club And Therefore, Everything We Say Is Fact, the quartet claim inspiration from bands such as Devo, The Skids, Polysics, Buddy Holly and Ex Models, and described their sound as "mutant science punk rock" (described by them as "...a way to make fairly derivative sound more interesting"). They have played gigs with Art Brut, Polysics, You Say Party! We Say Die!, Desaparecidos (band) and Thirty Seconds to Mars and have appeared on Marc Riley's Brain Surgery on BBC 6 Music. In a concert review, the BBC said of vocalist Michael M: "he doesn’t actually sing so much as run around like one of those aliens from Mars Attacks".

In April 2008, We Are the Physics' video for their single "You Can Do Athletics, btw" (directed by Colin Kennedy) was released, featuring the band as patients in a 1960s style hospital being 'upgraded' by singer Michael M, dressed as a doctor, in order to destroy a 50-ft woman attacking Glasgow. The single was awarded 'Single of the Week' by Drowned in Sound in April 2008. This single preceded the band's debut album, We Are the Physics Are OK at Music, released through This Is Fake DIY Records in May 2008. A headlining tour commenced to promote it. The album was generally well received. The Independent's Simon Price described the album: "The majority of tracks on their debut album sound like the Dead Kennedys' "California Uber Alles" and Soft Cell's "Memorabilia" blended in a cement mixer: an unholy chaos of screeches and bleeps, clangs and shouts", while The Mirror described the album as "short, sharp and to-the-jugular". Drowned in Sound were less complementary, describing the album as "an entirely one-dimensional debut that will either become a favourite of attention-deficit sorts everywhere or be consigned to whatever shores all those unsold Ikara Colt and KaitO LPs washed up on".

In an interview at the T in the Park festival in 2008, the band said that they were already bored with the songs on their debut album, and were writing songs for their second album. The band has since been in the studio recording new tracks for their second album, some of which have already made their live debut.

In 2013 they announced indefinite hiatus via social media. The three Michaels from the group have since gone on to form a new band, "Slime City", 2017.

== Memoir ==
In 2024, the band's vocalist and bassist, Michael M, published You're Doing It Wrong: My Life as a Failed International Rock Star (In the Best Band You've Never Heard) through Last Night from Glasgow. The memoir recounts his experiences with We Are The Physics between 2005 and 2015, through a series of anecdotes about touring, the music industry and the band's limited commercial success.

Writing in The Big Issue in March 2025, Malcolm Jack described the book as an unconventional rock memoir, focusing on the experiences of musicians who've never reached widespread fame. The book also explores Michael M's upbringing in Glasgow and his personal reflections on the band's career.

== Discography ==
=== Singles ===
- Less Than Three (2006) One
- Fear of Words / This Is Vanity (2007) One
- You Can Do Athletics, btw (2008) This is Fake DIY

=== Albums ===
- We Are the Physics Are OK at Music (2008) This is Fake DIY
- Your Friend, The Atom (2012)
