= Chasen (band) =

American Christian rock band

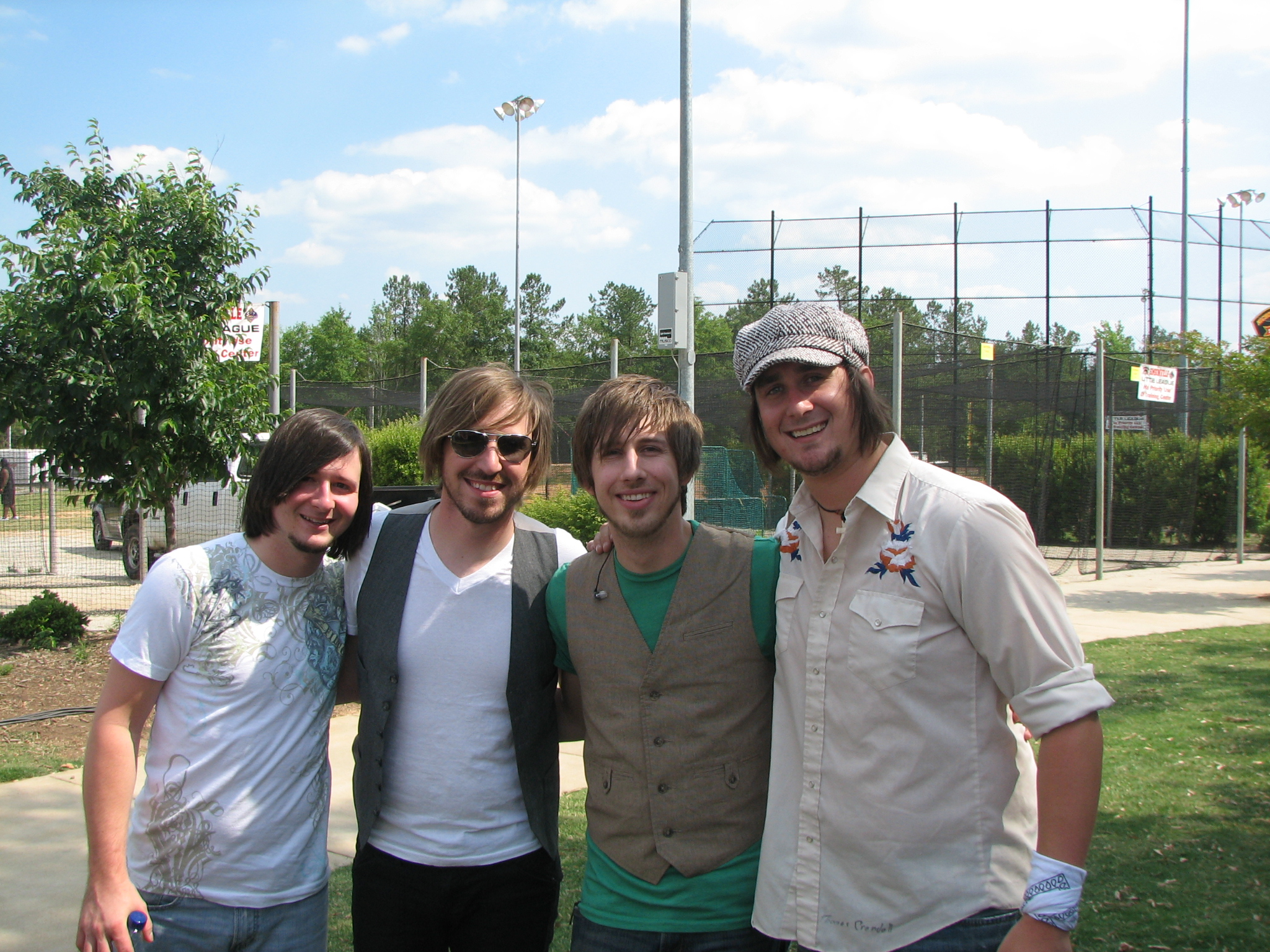
- Chasen in May 2008

Background information
- Genres: Christian rock, CCM, soft rock
- Years active: 2006–2012
- Labels: INO
- Past members: Chase Callahan; Evan Silver; Aaron Lord; Doug Price

Chasen was a Christian rock band from Greenville, South Carolina. The band is composed of Chase Callahan (lead vocals, guitar, keyboards), Evan Silver (guitar), Aaron Lord (drums) and bassist Doug Price. Their first album was the independent release Another Way of Life. In 2006 they were signed to OMG Records and recorded a promotional EP for Coca-Cola Dasani. The first song from the album, "Crazy Beautiful", charted in the Top 10 on the R&R magazine chart as of January 2008 and it was the 22nd most-played song of 2008 on U.S. Contemporary Christian music radio stations according to R&R magazine's Christian CHR chart. Their debut full-length studio album, Shine Through the Stars, was released on April 15, 2008, on OMG Records. The song "Drown" was also released as a radio single in 2008.

Their second album That Was Then, This Is Now was released on March 9, 2010, on INO Records.

== Disbanding ==
Chasen was disbanded in 2012. Lead singer Chase Callahan became a worship pastor at Marathon Church in Greenville, South Carolina. Since 2015, Callahan has taken over the worship environment of Fellowship Greenville in Greenville, South Carolina. Evan Silver, Jared Barber, and Wil Martin became staff members at NewSpring Church, a multi-site church based out of Anderson, South Carolina.

== Band members ==
- Chase Callahan – lead vocals, guitar, keyboards
- Evan Silver – guitar
- Aaron Lord – drums
- Doug Price – bass guitar
- Jamie Crumpton – guitar, background vocals
- Wil Martin – bass guitar, background vocals
- Clint Hudson – bass guitar, background vocals
- Phil Snowden – bass guitar, background vocals
- Jared Barber – bass guitar, lead vocals

== Discography ==
=== Albums ===
- Chasen – 2004
- Another Way of Life – 2006
- Shine Through the Stars – 2008
- That Was Then, This Is Now – 2010

=== Singles ===
- "Crazy Beautiful" – peaked at No. 1 on Christian CHR, No. 22 for 2008
- "Drown"
- "On and On" – peaked at No. 1 for seven weeks on Christian R&R
- "Castaway" – Entered the charts at No. 22 on the R&R and stayed at No. 1 for five weeks
- "One in a Million"
