= Où s'en vont les avions? =

Studio album by Julien Clerc
- Released: 12 September 2008
- Recorded: Italy
- Genre: Pop
- Label: Virgin Music

Julien Clerc chronology
| 100 chansons (2006) | Où s'en vont les avions? (2008) | Fou, Peut-être (2011) |

Singles from Où s'en vont les avions ?
- 1. "La Jupe en laine" Released: 2008

Où s'en vont les avions? is a studio album recorded by French singer Julien Clerc. It was released on 12 September 2008.

A pop record, it went straight to number-one in France and Belgium (Wallonia). Maxime Le Forestier, Benjamin Biolay, Carla Bruni are among the artists who wrote some tracks for this album. The first single, "La Jupe en laine", was only available digitally.

== Track listing ==
CD

1. "La Jupe en laine" (Clerc, Duguet-Grasser) – 3:28
2. "Restons amants" (Clerc, Maxime Le Forestier) – 3:33
3. "Où s'en vont les avions ?" (Clerc, Duguet-Grasser) – 3:07
4. "Sous sa grande ombrelle" (Benjamin Biolay, Clerc)– 2:37
5. "Apprendre à lire" (Clerc, Dabadie) – 3:04
6. "Une petite fée" (Clerc, Manset) – 2:00
7. "Frère, elle n'en avait pas" (Clerc, Manset) – 2:47
8. "Souvenez-vous" (Clerc, McNeil) – 3:02
9. "Forcément" (Clerc, Duguet-Grasser) – 3:19
10. "La Rue Blanche, le Petit Matin bleu" (Biolay, Clerc) – 3:20
11. "Déranger les pierres" (Carla Bruni, Clerc) – 3:22
12. "Dormez" (Clerc, Le Forestier) – 3:23
13. "Toboggan" (Clerc, McNeil) – 3:20
14. "Le Juge et la Blonde" (Clerc, Le Forestier) – 5:18

DVD - Collector edition

1. "Making of de l'album" : "Où s'en vont les avions ?"

== Personnel ==
Adapted from AllMusic.

- Michel Amsellem – piano
- Elsa Benabdallah – violone
- Denis Benarrosch – drums, percussion, programming
- Benjamin Biolay – alto, arranger, basse, celeste, clavier, composer, fender rhodes, guitar, harmonium, melodica, piano, programming, realization, string arrangements, trombone, trumpet, ukulele, violin, wurlitzer
- Dominique Blanc-francard – Basse, Mastering
- Florent Bremond – alto
- Bertrand Cervera – violone
- Julien Clerc – choeurs, clavier, piano, primary artist
- Jérôme Colliard – design
- Christophe Morin – cello
- Eric Sauviat – guitar
- Bénédicte Schmitt – engineer, mixing, programming, realization
- Laurent Vernerey – basse, contrabass

== Charts ==
=== Weekly charts ===
| Chart (2008) | Peak position |
|---|---|
| Belgian (Flanders) Albums Chart | 55 |
| Belgian (Wallonia) Albums Chart | 1 |
| French Albums Chart | 1 |
| Swiss Albums Chart | 11 |

=== Year-end charts ===
| Chart (2008) | Position |
|---|---|
| Belgian (Wallonia) Albums Chart | 31 |
| French Albums Chart | 21 |
| Chart (2009) | Position |
| Belgian (Wallonia) Albums Chart | 58 |

=== Certifications ===
Certifications for Où s'en vont les avions ?
| Region | Certification | Certified units/sales |
|---|---|---|
| Belgium (BRMA) | Gold | 15,000^{*} |
| France (SNEP) | 3× Platinum | 300,000^{*} |
^{*} Sales figures based on certification alone.

== Release history ==
| Date | Label | Country | Format | Catalog |
|---|---|---|---|---|
| September 12, 2008 | Virgin | Belgium, France, Switzerland | CD | 5099923593121 |
| September 12, 2008 | Virgin | Belgium, France, Switzerland | CD + DVD | 5099923635029 |
