= Serenity (Prosumer and Murat Tepeli album) =

Studio album by Prosumer and Murat Tepeli
- Released: 28 January 2008
- Recorded: 2007
- Studio: Panorama Bar (Berlin, Germany)
- Genre: Detroit techno; Chicago house; deep house; microhouse
- Length: 72:39
- Label: Ostgut Ton
- Producer: Prosumer, Murat Tepeli

Singles from Serenity
- 1. "Turn Around" Released: 7 January 2008

Alternate covers

Serenity is a collaborative album by DJ Achim Brandenburg, known by his stage name as Prosumer, and producer Murat Tepeli. The record also features vocals from Elf Biçer on some tracks. It was released on the label Ostgut Ton in January 2008 to generally positive reviews from critics, who favored the duo for making use of their old Chicago house sound while still managing to sound contemporary.

== Production and composition ==
Around ten years before Serenity, Achim Brandenburg and Murat Tepeli first met at a Hard Wax shop in Saarbrücken. But it wasn't until Brandenburg moved to Berlin and Murat moved to Cologne that they started making music together. Regarding Brandenburg's musical partnership with Tepeli, he said in an interview, "It’s a feeling of understanding. I hear his feelings in his music and that triggers something similar in me, so I can come up with vocals. He sings, representing what he’s doing and it all comes together — it fits."

Unlike most other house and techno releases which often compile tracks, Serenity has more full-on songs and has an actual storyline. According to Brandenburg, "When were thinking about making an album, we thought the tracks we can put out on EPs; but if we do an album, we want to really do something that feels like an album that has a story to tell, that has a storyline in itself — something you would want to listen to at home. At home I listen to dance music, but a lot of stuff I play in the club while DJing I don’t listen to at home. It’s perfect for the dance floor, but at home, I go for something which is more song-based." For the tracks Brandenburg and Tepeli together, they started with Murat sending instrumental ideas he had for years, occasionally with vocals, which were then rearranged or had additional parts like a 303 added to them. Brandenburg said, "A lot of it came together spontaneously while mixing the album. With “Butterfly,” we actually did the track the day before the mastering started."

Brandenburg and Tepeli decided that the title track "Serenity" should be the first and last track of the album, and the rest of the tracks "just happened." The first half of Serenity are mainly instrumental tracks, while the remaining half is more song-based and lyrical. The opening title track involves Brandenburg singing about his depressions that he suffered through during the year he recorded the album, which is followed by "I Go Mad" where he sings about his boyfriend. The instrumental for the album's 54-second interlude “Drama Baby” had been performed live by Brandenburg and Tupeli for a while, but it wasn't until Elif Biçer started improvising over the track and singing "Drama, baby" that it was finished with vocals. According to Brandenburg, it was her idea to put "Drama Baby" on the LP. What follows is the more "happy, more dancey/party side" of the album.

The songs "Lov" and "The Craze" were recorded live at Panorama Bar. Serenity was finally mastered by Loop-O at Dubplates & Mastering in Berlin.

The music on Serenity falls in line with the works of ofter Chicago house artists and labels including Ron Trent, Chez Damier, Armando, Trax Records, DJ International, DJ Pierre, Cajmere, Fingers Inc., Dancemania and Matthew Herbert, as well as microhouse labels including Kompakt and Mutek.

== Release and artwork ==
The release of Serenity was announced on 21 November 2007, and leading up to the release, "Turn Around" was distributed as the album's lead single on 7 January 2008. The record was issued by Ostgut Ton on 28 January 2008. A double 12" vinyl release includes extended versions of what the press release the album's most danceable tracks, as well as three additional tracks. Matthew Connors did the artwork for Serenity. Prosumer & Murat Tepeli did the photography, while Yusuf Etiman handled the layout. According to Prosumer and Murat Tepeli, they originally planned the cover art for Serenity to be a recreation of the cover for Ike & Tina Turner's Outta Season, which depicts them eating watermelon in whiteface. However, they changed it to simply a plain cover with only the title on it, reasoning that, "We were told that it would upset people and we did not want to hurt anybody."

== Critical reception ==
Professional ratings
Review scores
Source	Rating
The A.V. Club	B+
PopMatters	5/10 stars
Resident Advisor	4.5/5
XLR8R	7.5/10

Serenity garnered generally positive reviews upon release, with praise going towards the duo's use of their Chicago house reference while still managing to sound new and contemporary enough to not be a "blatant homage," according to XLR8R reviewer Dave Segal. The most favorable review came from Peter Chambers of Resident Advisor. Scoring the album a 4.5 out of five, he praised the loose yet polished arrangements and described it overall as "the golden age recast as the gleaming spirit of the now, and it soars." The publication later ranked it number 11 on their list of the top 20 albums of 2008, and number 100 on their list of the best albums of the 2000s.

The A.V. Club reviewer Andy Battaglia, who graded the record a B+, wrote that the duo "favor function as much as comfort, whether leaning into a groove or pulling back to remember how grooves used to go." In his 7.5-out-of-ten XLR8R review, Segal's criticism towards Serenity were on the "drama-queen vocals [...] with soap-opera scenarios" which caused the record to have too much personality, as well as the "too muffled and restrained" beats and "cloying" melodies. He said the record was at its best when it lets the music handle the emotions, which comes near "the subtle melodic grandeur and tonal depth of Carl Craig and Theo Parrish." One mixed review of the record was written by Alan Ranta for PopMatters, writing that while the instrumentals were "flawlessly balanced and easily danceable examples of old school micro-house," he disliked the overused love lyrical style and the forced, immature and underdeveloped vocal delivery that caused the album to sound "boring and sexless".

== Track listing ==
Serenity – Standard version
No.	Title	Writer(s)	Producer(s)	Length
1.	"Serenity"	Achim Brandenburg, Murat Tepeli	Prosumer, Tepeli	4:09
2.	"I Go Mad"	Brandenburg, Tepeli	Prosumer, Tepeli	5:22
3.	"Drama Baby" (featuring Elif Biçer)	Brandenburg, Tepeli, Elif Biçer	Prosumer, Tepeli	0:54
4.	"Lov" (featuring Elif Biçer)	Brandenburg, Tepeli	Prosumer, Tepeli	3:59
5.	"Turn Around" (featuring Elif Biçer)	Brandenburg, Tepeli, Biçer	Prosumer, Tepeli	4:46
6.	"The Craze"	Brandenburg, Tepeli	Prosumer, Tepeli	3:43
7.	"Go Silla"	Tepeli	Tepeli	5:18
8.	"Makes Me Wanna Dance"	Brandenburg	Prosumer	4:57
9.	"Give And Take"	Brandenburg, Tepeli	Prosumer, Tepeli	4:11
10.	"Butterfly" (featuring Elif Biçer)	Brandenburg, Tepeli, Biçer	Prosumer, Tepeli	4:50
11.	"Believe" (Instrumental)	Brandenburg, Tepeli	Prosumer, Tepeli	5:35
12.	"Latenight"	Brandenburg	Prosumer	4:49
13.	"Untitled"	Brandenburg, Tepeli	Prosumer, Tepeli	0:12
14.	"Noone Else"	Tepeli	Tepeli	5:13
15.	"Solid Mind"	Brandenburg	Prosumer	6:53
16.	"Devotion"	Tepeli	Tepeli	5:25
17.	"Serenity Reprise"	Brandenburg, Tepeli	Prosumer, Tepeli	2:23
Total length:				72:39

Serenity – Double vinyl 12"
No.	Title	Writer(s)	Producer(s)	Length
1.	"Go Silla" (Extended)	Tepeli	Tepeli
2.	"Dontstop"	Brandenburg	Prosumer
3.	"Makes Me Wanna Dance"	Brandenburg	Prosumer
4.	"Alpha" (Extended)	Brandenburg	Prosumer
5.	"Butterfly" (Extended featuring Elif Biçer)	Brandenburg, Tepeli and Biçer	Prosumer, Tepeli
6.	"Give And Take" (Extended)	Brandenburg, Tepeli	Prosumer, Tepeli
7.	"Cathedral"	Tepeli	Tepeli
8.	"Noone Else" (Extended)	Tepeli	Tepeli
