= Alexis Blue =

English indie rock band

- Also known as: AB
- Origin: Wirral, England
- Genres: Indie rock
- Years active: 2005–2010; 2014–present
- Label: Unsigned
- Members: Andrew Stewart; Mark Easton; Paul Easton
- Past members: Tom McCarron; Chris Stewart
- Website: http://www.alexisblue.co.uk

Alexis Blue were an English four-piece indie rock band, made up of one pair of brothers and two friends from the Wallasey area of Merseyside, the band was unsigned, but self-released their music through an independent record label set up by the band and associates - People vs Grass Records.

Interviews saw the band cite numerous musical influences including The Libertines, Bright Eyes, Supergrass, Ben Folds and The Coral. The resulting sound indie guitar rock coupled with lyrics.

Their fanbase consisted of Merseysiders, Wirralians and Welsh folk, while their Indie guitar sound and insightful lyrics attracted the attention of enthusiasts of a wide range of ages, throughout the UK, the rest of Europe and America.

== Beginning ==
The band was formed in September 2005 following the split of another Wirral band 'The Rails', with that band's lead guitarist Andrew Stewart and drummer Mark Easton being joined by Tom McCarron to form Alexis Blue. Paul Easton, younger brother of Mark, subsequently joined the band in November. They toured substantially throughout 2006, gaining attention and subsequent tour support slots from Little Man Tate, Milburn and Bromheads Jacket. In that summer, the band caught the eye of Southampton-based label Coercion Records who signed the band to put out a promotional release and 7-inch vinyl to be released later in the year. The band then caught the limelight of the local and national press, with numerous articles and radio/magazine interviews.

== 2007 ==
2007 saw the band receive a new lease of life, and continue to gig around the country gaining popularity. Chris Stewart, Andy's older brother, was drafted in on bass guitar, and with a new lineup and supports alongside The Eighties Matchbox B-Line Disaster, The Wombats and Parka saw them achieve recognition from the industry. In March the band were picked by A+R representatives for Polydor Records to be in the final 30 of O2's Undiscovered competition to play the O2 Wireless Festival in Hyde Park, London. However they failed to make the final 11. Again, in March, the band were asked to headline Club NME in Middlesbrough, playing a high-profile set at the popular Middlesbrough Empire.

Their debut single 'You Won't Get Much Sleep' was released 9 July 2007 on limited edition blue vinyl along with the b-side 'Break The Routine'. The single was also available on iTunes and various other online digital record stores. 'You Won't Get Much Sleep' sold out within weeks in both the UK and Japan.

The music video for the single was created by Tomfoolery Pictures Ltd and tells the story of an Alexis Blue fan who returns to her bedroom following a gig to find the band, who previously were in pictures and posters, now in the room and take her off to their 'poster/picture world'. Green Screen technology was used to create key scenes, the band were also 'paled down' using make up to create an eerie feel. This video was broadcast on MTV2 during September & October as well as the large BBC video screen in Liverpool City Centre.

To support the release, a small tour was undertaken, including Birkenhead, Chester, Sheffield, Manchester, Birmingham, Norwich, Liverpool and the band performing at Glastonbury Festival two weeks prior. In May the band signed a Publishing deal with Yell Music, who also work with popular Columbia band Midtown (band).

In October, Liverpool group The Wombats personally asked the band to play at their Album Launch Party on the River Mersey which took place on 18 October. Also at that showcase on the River was local celebrity and Clairvoyant Derek Acorah. It was mentioned that Derek enjoyed the gig and even went home with an Alexis Blue t-shirt. November saw the band play their largest Liverpool gig to date, where they headlined the Liverpool Barfly Theatre. This special gig was filmed for future DVD release by visual company Tomfoolery Pictures Ltd using 3 still and 3 handheld HD cameras. The year ended with a special Liverpool Xmas/New Year headline gig which was held on a stage laden with Christmas trees and lights.

== 2008 ==
Starting 2008 the band performed an acoustic set live on BBC Radio Merseyside and were named as one of the 'Top 10 Current Bands From Liverpool'. The band set out on a mini UK tour in February which saw them headline Alan McGee's highly regarded Death Disco in London, West Street Live in Sheffield as well as venues in Chester (Frog), Liverpool (Barfly), Leeds (Trash) and home town area, Liscard (27 Club - Record Label Club Night Opening). Ending the month they played alongside Liverpool band Rebecca in the 1,200 capacity venue Liverpool Carling Academy 1. This month also saw the band undertake various media interviews.

In March the video for 'You Won't Get Much Sleep' began further television broadcast on the 'Virgin Media On Demand' channel. It was also in this month that it was announced that the band planned to record and self-release an album. This month also saw the band featured on a 'Visit Britain: Britain Rocks' promotional compilation CD released in America.

In April the band discovered they were through to the final 14 of that year's 'Road to V' competition. Their Carling Academy 1 gig for the final took place in early May. The Road To V final was preceded by the band performing an acoustic set and interview on BBC Radio Merseyside the same day.

June saw the band announce their future date headlining Liverpool Barfly and two festival slots alongside bands including The Automatic, Parka, Amsterdam and The Cordels. June also saw the band start work on their debut album which is due for release nearing the end of 2008 and will contain both past favourites and new material.

In July Channel 4 broadcast a couple of live songs and an interview with the band as part of 4Musics Road To V 2008 program. The broadcast contained live performances of Your Easy Life and Passive/Aggressive (Altar Ego was cut from broadcast)

In October the band played their first gig in Italy, taking place at Teatro La Fabbrica in Villadossola near Milan. Also in the same month the band played a gig with Noah & The Whale as part of MTV Liverpool Music Week 2008.

Alexis Blue released their 11-track debut album Hypothetical Situations on Friday, 21 November 2008. Also in November the band performed alongside Sheffield band Little Man Tate at Pacific Road Arts Theatre in Birkenhead as part of the UK International Guitar Festival 2008.

The band ended 2008 playing special home town area gigs including Liverpool Barfly, giving end of year interviews and performing acoustic sets & interviews on radio stations including 7waves FM and LeithFM.

== 2009 ==
May, June and July saw Alexis Blue set off on a UK wide tour with new material to showcase. This 25+ date tour saw them play dates that include Glasgow, Liverpool, London, Manchester, Edinburgh, Sheffield and Blackburn. Shortly after the tour was completed, it was announced that Chris was to leave the band to focus on family commitments, and Tom would be rejoining after returning from Bangor University.

== 2010 ==
On 22 July, Alexis Blue announced on their website that the band would break up after five years. The members said that the group had band has run its course, and need fresh projects to concentrate on. To mark their five-year anniversary, they scheduled a final headline concert on 1st October 2010, in style with a 14+ headline gig at the Masque in Liverpool.

The band members, Andrew, Mark, Paul, and Tom, thanked their fans and the people who had been there for them during their career. They said that the success they achieved was due to this support. Before the final performance, the group intended to complete their existing professional work and they promised to provide updates on their future work later.

== 2015 ==
At the start of 2015, Andrew, Mark and Paul announced on social media that they will reform for a one-off gig and album release set for later in the year. The newly reformed 3-piece spent the summer months recording their album in Elevator Studios in Liverpool. In October, the band played a successful come back gig at the Zanzibar in Liverpool with session bass player Zak Jones, and subsequently released their album titled Tell Me Where To Go, made up of re-worked versions of old songs and one new track. This was released via iTunes and Spotify, and also a limited run of 50 CD's. The band rounded off their reunion year, featuring as main support for The Ordinary Boys at Wigan Old Courts in November.

== Band members ==
=== Andrew Stewart ===
Andrew Stewart was the lead vocalist of the band, rhythm guitarist and keyboardist. He also wrote Alexis Blue's lyrics, and the bulk of their songs. He played a Blueburst Rickenbacker 360 through his VOX AD100 (with custom blue grill) and Vox Tonelab SE. He also used an Alesis Micron, and a Takamine EF508C for acoustic performances

=== Mark Easton ===
Mark Easton was the band's drummer. He also provided backing vocals on the majority of the band's songs. He played a handmade Premier Series maple traditional drum kit in blue sparkle, with a Blue Norwegian Sparkle Premier Series classic maple snare drum, Zildjian Avedis cymbals, cowbell and a Roland SPD-S sampling pad. In 2015, he played a Gretsch New Classic kit in Vintage Glass sparkle, with a 1966 Ludgwig 400 snare drum and Zildjian K cymbals.

=== Paul Easton ===
Known amongst the Alexis Blue fanbase as portly Paul, Easton played lead guitar and provided backing vocals. He played his Fender Telecaster through a limited edition Green Fender Deluxe combo amp. He also played tambourine during the song Altar Ego.
