= You Can Do Athletics, btw =

Single by We Are The Physics
- Released: 21 April 2008
- Genre: Alternative rock
- Label: This Is Fake DIY

We Are The Physics singles chronology
"Fear of Words / This Is Vanity" (2007)	"You Can Do Athletics, btw" (2008)

"You Can Do Athletics, btw" was the third single by We Are The Physics and the first to be released from their debut album on new label This Is Fake DIY Records. It is a song about upgrading the human body/posthumanism but is regularly introduced by singer Michael M as 'a song about running very fast'.

The single received radio airplay in the UK from Steve Lamacq and reached Number 8 in the UK Indie Charts.

The song was awarded 'Single of the Week' by Drowned in Sound in April 2008.

== Track listing ==
1. "You Can Do Athletics, btw"
2. "Filming Me Filming You"
3. "You Can Do Athletics, btw [Unbummed Radio Edit]"

== Video ==
The video for the single (directed by Colin Kennedy) featured the band as patients in a 1960s style hospital being 'upgraded' by singer Michael M (dressed as a doctor) in order to defeat a giant 50' woman attacking Glasgow.
