= Rotting Paradise =

Studio album by Coldworker
- Released: May 13, 2008
- Recorded: June 6–24, 2006
- Genre: Death metal, grindcore
- Label: Relapse Records
- Producer: Dan Swanö

Coldworker chronology
Pig Destroyer / Coldworker / Antigma (2007)	Rotting Paradise (2008)	The Doomsayer's Call (2012)

Professional ratings
Review scores
Source	Rating
Allmusic	3.5/5 stars

Rotting Paradise is the second album from Scandinavian metal band Coldworker. It was released by Relapse Records on May 13, 2008, on both CD and vinyl.

== Track listing ==
1. "Reversing the Order" (Bertilsson)
2. "Citizens of the Cyclopean Maze" (music: Jakobson, lyrics: Fornbrant)
3. "Symptoms of Sickness" (music: Bertilsson/Schröder, lyrics: Pålsson)
4. "The Black Dog Syndrome" (Pålsson)
5. "Comatose State" (Bertilsson)
6. "Paradox Lost" (Jakobson)
7. "The Last Bitter Twist" (music: Jakobson/Schröder, lyrics: Fornbrant)
8. "Seizures" (music: Bertilsson, lyrics: Fornbrant)
9. "The Machine" (music: Fornbrant/Jakobson, lyrics: Jakobson)
10. "I am the Doorway" (Jakobson)
11. "Scare Tactics" (Pålsson)
12. "Deliverance of the Rejected" (music: Jakobson/lyrics: Fornbrant)
