= Shine Through the Stars =

Studio album by Chasen
- Released: April 15, 2008
- Genre: Christian rock, Contemporary Christian music, alternative rock, soft rock
- Length: 51:15
- Label: OMG

Chasen chronology
Chasen EP (2006)	Shine Through the Stars (2008)	That Was Then This is Now (2010)

Professional ratings
Review scores
Source	Rating
AllMusic	4.5/5 stars
Christian Music Today	3.5/5 stars
Jesus Freak Hideout	2/5 stars
CCM Magazine	(positive)

Shine Through the Stars is the first full-length studio album by Christian rock band Chasen, released on April 15, 2008. Two singles have been released off the album; "Crazy Beautiful" and "Drown". The first single "Crazy Beautiful" reached No. 1 on CRW's Christian Contemporary Hit Radio (CHR) chart, as well as the top 10 on R&R’s CHR chart.

== Track listing ==
1. "If It Comes Down" – 3:36
2. "Crazy Beautiful" – 2:47
3. "Nothing Like You" – 2:36
4. "Drown" – 3:56
5. "Doubts or Disbelief" – 3:59
6. "All Creation" – 4:08
7. "History Tonight" – 4:00
8. "All I Can Say" – 3:01
9. "God & King" – 4:18
10. "Desires" – 3:35
11. "You and I" – 3:22
12. "Don't Walk Away" – 3:27
13. "Stars Are Meant to Shine" – 8:30
