= Coldworker =

Swedish deathgrind band

- Origin: Örebro, Sweden
- Genres: Death metal, deathgrind
- Years active: 2006–2013
- Label: Relapse
- Members: Joel Fornbrant; Anders Bertilsson; Daniel Schröder; Oskar Pålsson; Anders Jakobson
- Past members: André Alvinzi
- Website: www.coldworker.com

Coldworker was a Swedish deathgrind band formed in early 2006. The band signed a deal with Relapse Records in June 2006, and since then released three studio albums, the debut, The Contaminated Void, in November 2006, followed by Rotting Paradise in May 2008, and The Doomsayer's Call in February 2012. The band split up in July 2013.

== History ==
Nasum's former drummer Anders Jakobson formed Coldworker in early 2006. He recruited guitarist Anders Bertilsson (formerly of The Project Hate MCMXCIX) and bassist Oskar Pålsson. They began rehearsing and writing songs, and in March 2006, were joined by guitarist André Alvinzi (also in Carnal Grief). In April 2006, they settled on the name Coldworker, and were joined by singer Joel Fornbrant.

Coldworker played their first concert in June 2006, and soon after started recording their debut studio album, The Contaminated Void. The album was mixed by Dan Swanö and mastered by Peter In De Betou. In July 2006, the band signed a deal with Relapse Records.

Coldworker recorded their second album, Rotting Paradise, between December 2007 and January 2008. It was mixed and mastered by Dan Swanö at Unisound Studios. Around this time, Alvinzi left the band. Daniel Schröder replaced him. Rotting Paradise was released worldwide in May 2008 through Relapse Records on vinyl and CD.

== Members ==
=== Current members ===
- Joel Fornbrant - vocals (2006-2013)
- Anders Bertilsson - guitar (2006-2013)
- Oskar Pålsson - bass (2006-2013)
- Anders Jakobson - drums (2006-2013)
- Daniel Schröder - guitar (2007-2013)

=== Former members ===
- André Alvinzi – guitar (2006-2007)

== Discography ==
Year	Album details
2006	The Contaminated Void: Released: 13 November 2006; Label: Relapse; Format: CD (RR 6716-2), vinyl (RR 6716-1)
2007	Pig Destroyer / Coldworker / Antigama: Released: May 2007; Label: Relapse (RR 071); Format: 7-inch
2008	Rotting Paradise: Released: 13 May 2008; Label: Relapse; Format: CD (RR 7019-2), vinyl (RR 7019-1)
2012	The Doomsayer's Call: Released: 13 February 2012; Label: Listenable Records; Format: CD
