= Looking into It =

Looking Into It

Studio album by All Girl Summer Fun Band
- Released: September 23, 2008
- Genre: Indie rock, Indie pop
- Length: 36:03
- Label: AGSFB Music
- Producer: All Girl Summer Fun Band

All Girl Summer Fun Band chronology
2 (2003)	Looking Into It (2008)

Professional ratings
Review scores
Source	Rating
Allmusic	link
Pitchfork Media	(7.3/10) link

Looking Into It is the third album by All Girl Summer Fun Band, released in 2008, and the first to be self-released on the AGSFB Music label.

== Track listing ==
All songs written by Kim Baxter, Kathy Foster, and Jen Sbragia.

1. "Not the One for Me" - 3:14
2. "Something New" - 3:48
3. "Oh No" - 3:03
4. "Trajectory" - 3:17
5. "Lost" - 3:23
6. "Everything I Need" - 3:33
7. "The Only Ones" - 3:47
8. "Rewind" - 2:19
9. "Looking into It" - 2:18
10. "Plastic Toy Dream" - 3:38
11. "This Will Never End" - 3:43
