= All Girl Summer Fun Band =

American twee pop band, formed 1998

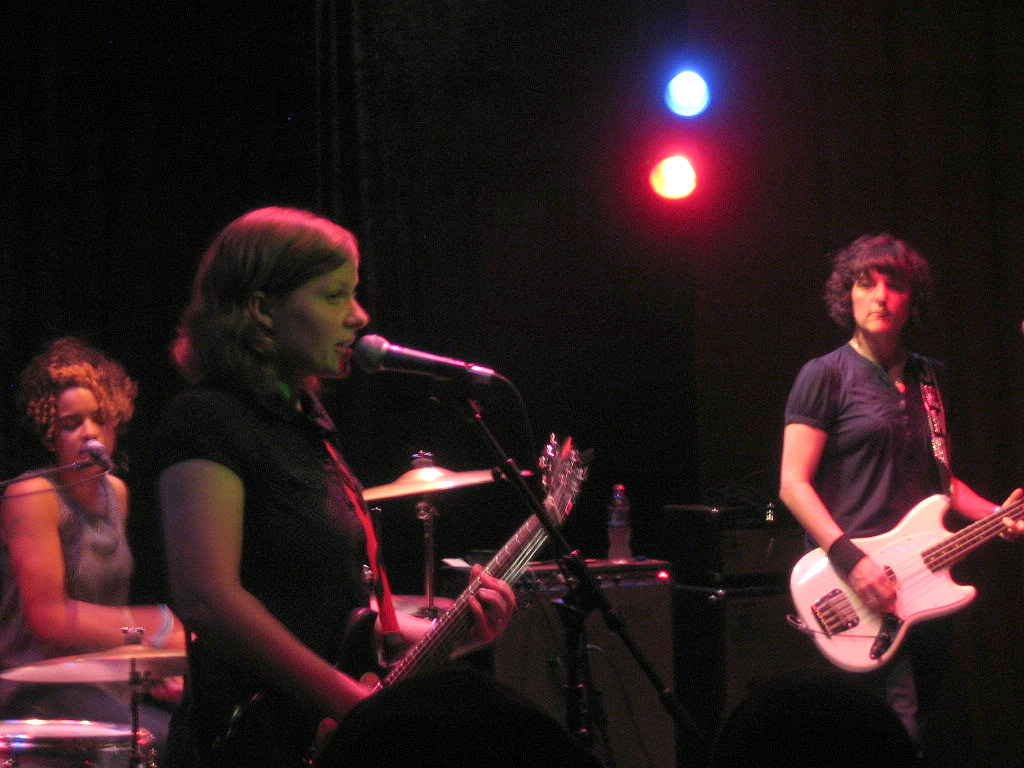
- All Girls Summer Fun Band in San Francisco, 2010

Background information
- Also known as: AGSFB
- Origin: Portland, Oregon, U.S.
- Genres: Indie pop, twee pop
- Years active: 1998–2009; 2023–present
- Labels: K; Magic Marker; AGSFB Music
- Members: Kim Baxter; Kathy Foster; Jen Sbragia
- Past members: Ari Douangpanya
- Website: https://www.agsfb.com/

All Girl Summer Fun Band (AGSFB) is an American, Portland based twee-pop band, initially composed of Kim Baxter, Kathy Foster, Jen Sbragia, and Ari Douangpanya.

== History ==
Baxter met Sbragia after a Softies show, when Baxter gave Sbragia a tape of her music. That summer, Baxter asked each of the girls if they wanted to start an "all girl summer fun band." Although the other three hadn't met before, they all agreed, and the band was formed.

After releasing an EP and several singles, they joined K Records. K released two albums for the band, an eponymous debut in 2002 and the follow-up 2 in 2003, before Douangpanya left the band in 2005 to raise her son. The remaining members continued as a three-piece.

On September 23, 2008, the band released their third full-length album, Looking into It. By 2009, the trio paused as the AGSFB to focus on other work and family commitments, but started touring again in 2023.

The members of AGSFB have played in various other bands, most notably Foster in The Thermals and Sbragia in The Softies, amongst others. The members of the band also work at Portland's Rock and Roll Camp for Girls.

== Discography ==
=== Albums ===
- All Girl Summer Fun Band (2002, K Records)
- 2 (2003, K Records)
- Looking into It (September 23, 2008, AGSFB Music)

=== EPs ===
- Summer of '98 (2003, Magic Marker)
- All Girl Summer Fun Band & Cars Can Be Blue (2009, Happy Happy Birth Day To Me Records)

=== Singles ===
- "All Girl Summer Fun Band" (1999, Magic Marker)
