= Cadia (band) =

American band from 2006 to 2008

- Origin: Nashville, Tennessee, United States
- Genres: Contemporary Christian music, power pop
- Years active: 2006-2008
- Labels: Fervent, Warner Bros.
- Past members: Courtney Myers; Tori Smith

Cadia was an American Christian pop group composed of long-time best friends Courtney Myers and Tori Smith. They both went to school at Christ Presbyterian Academy. Their name, Cadia, is derived from the Greek word Arcadia, meaning place of peace, symbolizing the peace found when fears, insecurities, and trials are released.

The group's debut album includes a song written by Nichole Nordeman called "Inside/Out", which was chosen as the official theme song for Women of Faith's Revolve Tour in 2007.

Myers is the older sister of Carolyne Myers from the Christian pop group pureNRG.

== Discography ==
Cadia

Studio album by Cadia
- Released: February 26, 2008
- Genres: CCM, Christian pop, Christian rock
- Length: 38:10
- Label: Fervent

Professional ratings
Review scores
Source	Rating
Jesus Freak Hideout	3/5 stars

=== Cadia (2008) ===
1. "Trust in Me Now"
2. "I'll Stay"
3. "Safe Place to Fall"
4. "This One's for the Girls"
5. "Shadowfeet"
6. "Jesus"
7. "Only a Prayer Away"
8. "Speak"
9. "Radiate"
10. "Curious"
11. "Inside/Out"
