= Scroobius Pip =

English actor, rapper and spoken word poet (born 1981)

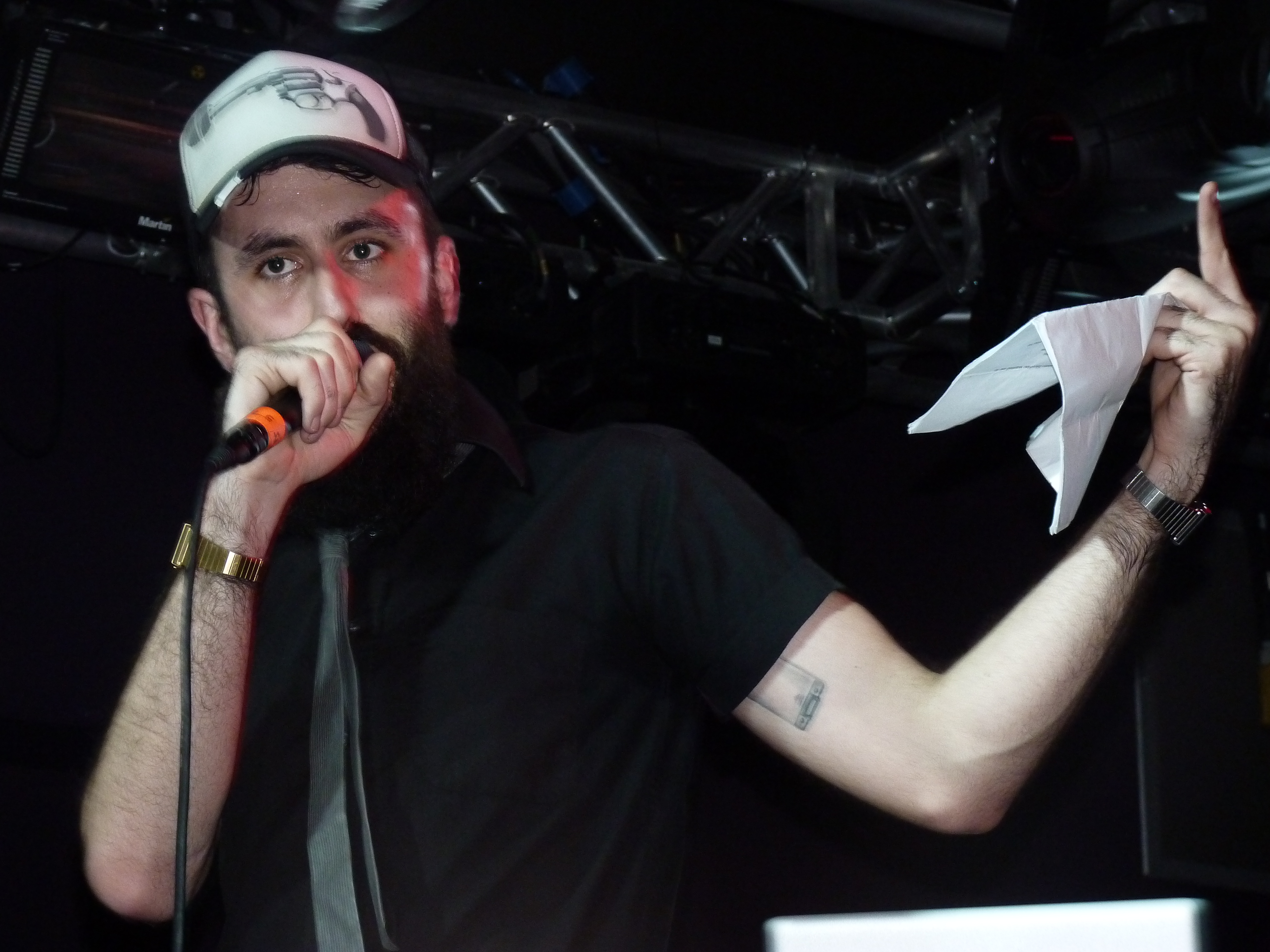
- Scroobius Pip on stage, 2010

Background information
- Born: David Meads; 3 August 1981 (age 45); Stanford-le-Hope, Essex, United Kingdom
- Genre: Hip-hop
- Occupations: Rapper, spoken-word artist, actor, podcaster
- Years active: 2005–present
- Labels: Speech Development Records, Strange Famous Records, Sunday Best Recordings, Lex Records
- Formerly of: Dan le Sac Vs Scroobius Pip
- Website: Official website

David Peter Meads (born 3 August 1981), known professionally as Scroobius Pip, is an English actor and podcaster as well as a former spoken word poet and hip-hop recording artist from Stanford-le-Hope, Essex. He first gained prominence as one half of hip-hop duo Dan le Sac Vs Scroobius Pip sparked by their debut single "Thou Shalt Always Kill".

He manages his own record label, Speech Development Records. He hosted the award-winning weekly radio show The Beatdown on XFM in the late 2000s and currently hosts the Distraction Pieces Podcast. In August 2016, he released a book entitled Distraction Pieces.

He appears as French Bill, an assistant to Atticus, in the eight-part historical fiction series Taboo (2017) on BBC One and FX.

== Career ==
=== Music ===
==== Early career ====
As a teenager, Scroobius Pip was inspired by punk music to buy a guitar and form various bands with his friends. His musical tastes quickly grew to encompass genres including hip-hop and jazz and he became interested in spoken word artists Gil Scott-Heron, Sage Francis and Saul Williams. This encouraged him to go solo; the idea of having no one to rely on or blame other than himself was an appealing challenge.

He adopted his stage name from Edward Lear's poem "The Scroobious Pip". He later explained: "I loved the story. It's about a creature that doesn't know what it is ...By the end [of the poem] he realises that he is simply The Scroobious Pip. He doesn't fit into any one category and can just be his own creature." In 2002 whilst working in an HMV store he made the decision to start saving his writing.

When he had written a full spoken word set and saved enough money to live for a year without income, he quit his job and toured the country in a 1987 Toyota Space Cruiser. Seeking out gig listings for each new town he visited, he turned up and performed his set to the fans queuing outside the venues, with mixed results. After a few months crossing the country, Scroobius Pip moved back home and decided to focus on London and Essex, attending four or five spoken word shows, open mic nights or poetry slams each week – anywhere that would let him perform. Various producers expressed a desire to work with him, but it was the beats of former HMV colleague Dan le Sac that captured his attention and led to the formation of Dan le Sac Vs Scroobius Pip.

==== Dan le Sac Vs Scroobius Pip ====
Dan le Sac Vs Scroobius Pip is a hip-hop duo combining electronic beats with sung, spoken and rapped lyrics, their critically acclaimed debut album Angles became one of the leading independent releases of 2008.

Despite growing up in the same Essex town Stanford-le-Hope, the duo's paths barely crossed until they shared a Christmas season working at the Lakeside branch of HMV. Dan Le Sac went on to book Scroobius Pip to play a gig he was promoting at the Fez Club (now Sakura) in Reading and around this time began remixing Scroobius Pip's debut solo album No Commercial Breaks.

Their first collaboration resulted in the track "Thou Shalt Always Kill", a dissection of modern British culture and a call to arms for individualism. The track appealed to XFM's John Kennedy who aired it in demo form 24 hours after he had received the CD-R. Pip set up a MySpace page with the solitary track, and the response was very favourable. The pair borrowed £200 to make the music video.

Shunning major label offers, Dan le Sac Vs Scroobius Pip signed to the independent Sunday Best Recordings for their UK releases and Strange Famous Records for the United States. Dan le Sac Vs Scroopius Pip have released three albums to date: Angles (2008), The Logic of Chance (2010) and Repent Replenish Repeat (2013). Since March 2007 they have undertaken multiple UK, US and European tours and have appeared at numerous festivals including Glastonbury, Reading and Leeds, Bestival, Coachella, Lowlands, Pukkelpop and Fuji Rock Festival.

=== Solo musical career ===
==== 2006: No Commercial Breaks ====
Scroobius Pip's debut album No Commercial Breaks was self-released in 2006, marking the start of his label Speech Development Records. Originally limited to a run of 1,000 copies, the album quickly sold out, resulting in various online bootlegs. The album was re-released in 2012, a two CD special with a bonus disc featuring his 60-minute sold out spoken word show from the Royal Albert Hall on 21 November 2012.

==== 2011: Distraction Pieces ====
Distraction Pieces is the second solo album by Scroobius Pip released in the UK on his own Speech Development Records and in the US on Strange Famous Records. Released on 19 September 2011, the album entered and peaked at No. 35 on the UK albums chart. Produced by Yila and Worgie, the record sees Scroobius Pip's lyrical dexterity and acclaimed blend of rap meets spoken-word play out across a collision of punk, rock and hip-hop production.

Collaborators include Travis Barker of Blink-182, Danny Lohner aka Renholder of Nine Inch Nails, Sage Francis, XL Records boss Richard Russell, P.O.S, Zane Lowe, Aupheus, B. Dolan, Steve Mason of The Beta Band and Natasha Fox, who provides the vocals for "Feel It", a cover of Scroobius Pip's favourite Kate Bush song.

=== Other releases ===
==== 2010: Poetry in (e) Motion ====
Poetry in (e) Motion is a collection of Scroobius Pip's poems illustrated by artists recruited via his MySpace page. The book was published in hardback on 26 March 2010 by Titan Books.

In 2007, Scroobius Pip put a shortlist of his poems up on MySpace and asked artists and illustrators to submit their interpretations. The only rule was that the poem had to be included in the artwork, in full and unabridged. Within the first few days he had received a small but passionate response. This number grew over the following year, resulting in hundreds of submissions from all over the world.

Opening with a foreword by Nick Frost, Poetry in (e) Motion sees nine of Pip's poems illustrated by his fans with a range of styles inspired by everything from street art, tattoos and crime noir movies.

==== 2014: Words DVD ====
On 3 August 2014, Scroobius Pip released his first live DVD Words, a two-disc special released on his own Speech Development Records. The DVD features his spoken word show Words live at the Edinburgh Festival Fringe 2013.

Words was first premiered at Latitude Festival to a crowd of over 4,000 festival goers. Scroobius Pip then made his debut appearance at the Edinburgh Festival Fringe with a 19-show run of Words. The show sold out every night and garnered huge critical acclaim, with The Scotsman declaring it: ‘A bewitching mixture of too-cool-for-school nonchalance and laser-like intensity.’

DVD extras include:

- 'Talking with Tim and Pip' – comedian Tim Key interviews Scroobius Pip about his Fringe experience
- 'One Drink' – a chat over a pint with Kae Tempest, Musa Okwonga, Polarbear, and Scroobius Pip
- Five music videos by Scroobius Pip: 'Astronaut', 'Introdiction', 'Let em Come', 'The Struggle', 'Soldier Boy Kill Em'
- Two spoken word videos by Scroobius Pip: 'Five Minutes', 'The Astounding Earnest Brace'
- Two music videos by Speech Development artist Jackamo Brown: 'When She Comes', 'Prayer For Slow Death'
- Three music videos by Speech Development artist warrenpeace: 'Indoor Voice', 'Hungry', 'FRNKLY STVN'

==== Future plans ====
Scroobius Pip stated in 2019 that he has no plans to release new music.

=== Speech Development Records ===
Speech Development Records is the independent label founded and run by Scroobius Pip. On the label's website, Pip describes its 'sloppy’ formation: “In 2006 I had quit my job in HMV and had 1,000 copies of my debut album No Commercial Breaks pressed. The label name I put on them was 'Speech Development Records'. They had no barcodes. I made up a catalogue number... but it wasn't registered anywhere.” This changed for the 2011 release of his second solo album Distraction Pieces, resulting in the label's official formation.

He has since released a slow and steady stream of records by other artists, an eclectic mix of genres, each defined by his admiration for their work. These include:

- Jackamo Brown – Oh No. The Drift of The World (2012)
- Polarbear – At Home With Polarbear (2012)
- warrenpeace – warrenpeace (2014)
- UK release of Sage Francis – Copper Gone (2014)

=== Radio show ===
In April 2013, XFM announced Scroobius Pip was joining the station to host his own weekly show The Beatdown. This would be the alternative music station's first dedicated hip-hop and spoken word programme. Speaking of the news, Pip commented: “The chance to work with XFM was one I couldn’t pass up. It’s the station that launched my career and, through amazing people like John Kennedy and Eddy Temple Morris, has always been at the forefront of giving exposure to new sounds. Hip-hop is such a deep genre and, through my show, I want to shine a light on some of the stuff that maybe doesn’t get enough of it.”

The first episode of The Beatdown was broadcast on 27 April 2013 from midnight to 1 am with the following track list:

1. Killer Mike – "R.A.P. Music"
2. B. Dolan – "Which Side Are You On? "
3. Ghostpoet – "Meltdown"
4. Sage Francis – "Mullet" (Spoken Word)
5. Macklemore & Ryan Lewis – "Thrift Shop "
6. Rap Battle Feature: Eminem vs Everlast
7. P.O.S – "Fuck Your Stuff"
8. Tim Dog and KRS-One – "I Get Wrecked "
9. Ratking – Piece of Shit
10. The Hood Internet – The XX Gon' Give It To Ya

On 12 May 2014, The Beatdown won 'Best Specialist Music Programme' at the 32nd annual Sony Radio Academy Awards. The most prestigious awards in the UK radio industry calendar, the show triumphed over tough competition from fellow nominees Zane Lowe, MistaJam, David Rodigan and Mark Radcliffe. The judges commented: "A maverick, nonlinear, nonconformist and radical triumph in every sense of the word. The Beatdown is a courageous endeavour that restores faith in the transformational power of radio with a unique presenter who sounds like no one else on British radio."

The Beatdown was broadcast every Saturday night 12 am – 1 am on XFM, until August 2014.

=== Podcast ===
In 2014, Scroobius Pip started a weekly podcast series called The Distraction Pieces Podcast. In each episode, he has held an in-depth interview with a range of comedians, actors, musicians and DJs. In the series so far he has interviewed, among others, Aisling Bea, Doc Brown, Goldie, Russell Brand, Josie Long, John Osborne, Paddy Considine, Frank Turner, Stewart Lee, Sara Pascoe, Simon Pegg, Nick Frost, Zane Lowe, Eddie Izzard, Kathy Burke, Richard Herring, Rufus Hound, Stephen Graham, Robin Ince, Wim Hof, James McAvoy, John Cooper-Clarke, Professor Green and Killer Mike.

=== Film ===
In 2024, Scroobius Pip launched a kickstarter for his directorial debut, Area of Outstanding Natural Beauty.

== Discography ==
=== Albums ===
Year	Album	UK	UK Indie	Label	Notes
2006	No Commercial Breaks	–	–	self-released	1,000 copies
2011	Distraction Pieces	No. 35	–	UK: Speech Development; US: Strange Famous Records	

=== Singles ===
Year	Single	UK	Label	Notes
2008	"Astronaut"	–	Sunday Best Recordings	YILA ft Scroobius Pip
2009	"Love Sic"	–	Concord Records	Christian Scott Vs Scroobius Pip
2011	"Introdiction"	–	Speech Development Records	–
2011	"Let Em Come" (feat. Sage Francis & P.O.S)	–	Speech Development Records	–
2011	"The Struggle"	–	Speech Development Records	–
2011	"Soldier Boy (Kill Em)" (feat. B. Dolan)	–	Speech Development Records	–

== Filmography ==
Year	Title	Role	Notes
2015	The Bastard Executioner	Scribe Master / Aiden Under	Episodes 6-8 / 10
2017	Taboo	French Bill	Recurring cast
2018	Walk Like a Panther	Terry	
2018	Kill Ben Lyk	Hipster Ben Lyk	
2020	Out of Her Mind	Robert	Episode 4 - Pop!
2020	The Letter for the King	Grey Rider	
2021	Debris	Anson Ash	Main cast
2021	Venom: Let There Be Carnage	Siegfried	
2024	The Acolyte	Scavenger	
2024	House of the Dragon	Herald	
2026	Young Sherlock	Fiddle Player	Episode 1
