= Distraction Pieces Podcast =

Interview podcast

- Genre: comedy podcast, news commentary podcast
- Language: English

Publication
- No. of episodes: 698

Reception
- Ratings: 4.75/5

Related
- Website: www.scroobiuspip.co.uk/distraction-pieces-podcast/

The Distraction Pieces Podcast is a weekly conversational podcast created and hosted by English spoken word poet and hip-hop artist Scroobius Pip. The podcast began on 13 October 2014 and has been released weekly ever since.

== Format ==
The podcasts are usually around one hour in duration and are released every Wednesday. Pip switched to this format from his radio show on Xfm after appearing on The Joe Rogan Experience and hearing other American long-form interview podcasters such as Marc Maron. Speaking with The Observer's Killian Fox, Pip described the podcast as "interesting conversations with interesting people", adding "obviously it's important to have some big names in there, such as Simon Pegg, Alan Moore and Billy Bragg, but we've also had people such as Dr Suzi Gage, who studies recreational drugs and their potential benefits and negatives, and the mortician Carla Valentine talking about the taboo of death. It can get incredibly heavy – we've had debates about race and mental health – but there's also a lot of silly nonsense". Pip bookends each episode with monologues in which he mentions sponsors for the show, updates the listener on his work, and reflects on the conversations in the podcasts.

== Awards ==
- Nominated for the Entertainment with Maple Street Studios award at the British Podcast Awards in 2017.
- Nominated by the Human Trafficking Foundation for their Anti-Slavery Day media awards for episode 86 (2016)

== Distraction Pieces Network ==
The Distraction Pieces Podcast is the flagship podcast of the eponymous network organised by Pip. Other shows on the network include Brett Goldstein's Films to Be Buried With, Suzi Gage's Say Why to Drugs, Jason Reed's Stop and Search, in association with LEAP UK, and Jim Smallman's Tuesday Night Jaw.

== Episodes ==
| Episode | Release Date | Subject |
|---|---|---|
| 1 | 13 October 2014 | Russell Brand |
| 2 | 22 October 2014 | Zane Lowe |
| 3 | 29 October 2014 | Alan Moore |
| 4 | 5 November 2014 | DJ Yoda |
| 5 | 12 November 2014 | Sage Francis |
| 6 | 19 November 2014 | Simon Singh |
| 7 | 26 November 2014 | Warren Ellis |
| 8 | 3 December 2014 | Jodi Ann Bickley |
| 9 | 10 December 2014 | B. Dolan |
| 10 | 17 December 2014 | Open Mike Eagle |
| 11 | 24 December 2014 | Simon Pegg |
| 12 | 31 December 2014 | Killer Mike |
| 13 | 7 January 2015 | Full Fact - Will and Phoebe |
| 14 | 14 January 2015 | Josie Long |
| 15 | 21 January 2015 | Stewart Lee |
| 16 | 28 January 2015 | Riz Ahmed |
| 17 | 4 February 2015 | Kae Tempest |
| 18 | 11 February 2015 | Rufus Hound |
| 19 | 18 February 2015 | Nick Frost |
| 20 | 25 February 2015 | Mike Skinner |
| 21 | 4 March 2015 | Frank Turner |
| 22 | 5 March 2015 | Billy Bragg |
| 23 | 11 March 2015 | Dylan Moran |
| 24 | 12 March 2015 | Ask Pip |
| 25 | 18 March 2015 | Wes Borland |
| 26 | 19 March 2015 | Rob da Bank |
| 27 | 25 March 2015 | Rou Reynolds |
| 28 | 26 March 2015 | Sara Pascoe |
| 29 | 1 April 2015 | Paddy Considine |
| 30 | 8 April 2015 | Danny Wallace |
| 31 | 15 April 2015 | Eddy Temple-Morris |
| 32 | 22 April 2015 | Ricki Hall |
| 33 | 29 April 2015 | Howard Marks |
| 34 | 6 May 2015 | Dan Hardy [Part 1] |
| 34 | 6 May 2015 | Dan Hardy [Part 2] |
| 35 | 13 May 2015 | Ask Pip |
| 36 | 20 May 2015 | Prince Charles Cinema (Paul Vickery) |
| 37 | 27 May 2015 | Michael Smiley |
| 38 | 29 May 2015 | Mr Heggie |
| 39 | 3 June 2015 | Gail Porter [Part 1] |
| 39 | 3 June 2015 | Gail Porter [Part 2] |
| 40 | 10 June 2015 | Romesh Ranganathan |
| 41 | 17 June 2015 | Amanda Palmer |
| 42 | 19 June 2015 | Refugee Week Special - Ramelle |
| 43 | 24 June 2015 | Jon Ronson [Part 1] |
| 43 | 24 June 2015 | Jon Ronson [Part 2] |
| 44 | 1 July 2015 | Flux Pavilion |
| 45 | 8 July 2015 | P.O.S |
| 46 | 8 July 2015 | Dessa |
| 47 | 10 July 2015 | B. Dolan |
| 48 | 15 July 2015 | Banquet Records - Jon Tolley |
| 49 | 22 July 2015 | Neil Maskell |
| 50 | 29 July 2015 | John Kennedy |
| 51 | 3 August 2015 | Birthday Special with Scroobius Pip's parents |
| 52 | 5 August 2015 | Greenpeace Special [Part 1] |
| 52 | 5 August 2015 | Greenpeace Special [Part 2] |
| 53 | 12 August 2015 | Suzi Gage |
| 54 | 19 August 2015 | Huw Stephens |
| 55 | 26 August 2015 | Carla Valentine |
| 56 | 2 September 2015 | Frank Carter |
| 57 | 9 September 2015 | Tall Dark Friend |
| 58 | 16 September 2015 | Tom Davis |
| 59 | 18 September 2015 | Andrew Shim |
| 60 | 23 September 2015 | Preston |
| 61 | 30 September 2015 | Garth Ennis |
| 62 | 7 October 2015 | Brett Goldstein & Jon Drever |
| 63 | 14 October 2015 | Roots Manuva |
| 64 | 21 October 2015 | Tom Robinson [Part 1] |
| 64 | 21 October 2015 | Tom Robinson [Part 2] |
| 65 | 28 October 2015 | Akala |
| 66 | 4 November 2015 | Adam Buxton |
| 67 | 11 November 2015 | DPP Live [Part 1] |
| 67 | 11 November 2015 | DPP Live [Part 2] |
| 68 | 18 November 2015 | Chris Jericho |
| 69 | 25 November 2015 | Kurt Sutter [Part 1] |
| 69 | 25 November 2015 | Kurt Sutter [Part 2] |
| 70 | 2 December 2015 | Richard Herring |
| 71 | 4 December 2015 | John Osborne |
| 72 | 9 December 2015 | Dale Vince |
| 73 | 16 December 2015 | Itch |
| 74 | 23 December 2015 | End Of Year Review [Part 1] |
| 75 | 24 December 2015 | End Of Year Review [Part 2] |
| 76 | 30 December 2015 | End Of Year Review [Part 3] |
| 77 | 31 December 2015 | End Of Year Review [Part 4] |
| 78 | 6 January 2016 | End Of Year Review [Part 5] |
| 79 | 13 January 2016 | Ask Pip [Part 1] |
| 79 | 13 January 2016 | Ask Pip [Part 2] |
| 80 | 20 January 2016 | Robin Ince |
| 81 | 27 January 2016 | Jason Reed |
| 82 | 3 February 2016 | Kieron Gillen & Jamie McKelvie |
| 83 | 10 February 2016 | Jim Smallman |
| 84 | 17 February 2016 | Saul Williams |
| 85 | 24 February 2016 | Ryan Callanan aka RYCA |
| 86 | 2 March 2016 | Housing For Women Special - Mira |
| 87 | 9 March 2016 | Stephen Graham |
| 88 | 11 March 2016 | LEAP UK Special |
| 89 | 16 March 2016 | Blindboy of The Rubberbandits |
| 90 | 23 March 2016 | Georgina Campbell |
| 91 | 30 March 2016 | Drunkcast |
| 91 | 30 March 2016 | Drunkcast [Part 1] |
| 91 | 30 March 2016 | Drunkcast [Part 2] |
| 91 | 31 March 2016 | Drunkcast [Part 3] |
| 92 | 6 April 2016 | Ask Pip |
| 93 | 12 April 2016 | Carl Barât |
| 94 | 19 April 2016 | Ed Skrein [Part 1] |
| 94 | 19 April 2016 | Ed Skrein [Part 2] |
| Bonus | 24 April 2016 | Bonus episode |
| 95 | 26 April 2016 | Michael Socha |
| 96 | 3 May 2016 | Kathy Burke |
| 97 | 10 May 2016 | Isy Suttie |
| 98 | 17 May 2016 | Will Ospreay |
| 99 | 24 May 2016 | David Earl & Joe Wilkinson |
| 100 | 31 May 2016 | Dan le Sac [Part 1] |
| 100 | 1 June 2016 | Dan le Sac [Part 2] |
| 101 | 7 June 2016 | Drunkcast [Part 1] |
| 101 | 8 June 2016 | Drunkcast [Part 2] |
| 101 | 14 June 2016 | Drunkcast [Part 3] |
| 102 | 21 June 2016 | Colin Murray [Part 1] |
| 102 | 22 June 2016 | Colin Murray [Part 2] |
| 103 | 28 June 2016 | Tom Rosenthal |
| 104 | 5 July 2016 | James Acaster |
| 105 | 12 July 2016 | Jordan Stephens (Rizzle Kicks) |
| 106 | 19 July 2016 | Thomas Coles |
| 107 | 26 July 2016 | Drunkcast [Part 1] |
| 107 | 27 July 2016 | Drunkcast [Part 2] |
| 107 | 27 July 2016 | Drunkcast [Part 3] |
| Bonus | 2 August 2016 | Birthday Special |
| 108 | 4 August 2016 | Live from The Leicester Square Theatre [Part 1] |
| 108 | 4 August 2016 | Live from The Leicester Square Theatre [Part 2] |
| 109 | 9 August 2016 | Live from the Edinburgh Fringe |
| 110 | 11 August 2016 | Live from Oran Mor, Glasgow |
| 111 | 17 August 2016 | Brendon Burns |
| 112 | 24 August 2016 | Marcus Brigstocke |
| 113 | 31 August 2016 | Limmy [Part 1] |
| 113 | 31 August 2016 | Limmy [Part 2] |
| 114 | 7 September 2016 | Neil Woods |
| 115 | 14 September 2016 | Bestival Special [Part 1] |
| 115 | 14 September 2016 | Bestival Special [Part 2] |
| 116 | 21 September 2016 | Edith Bowman |
| 117 | 28 September 2016 | Frankie Boyle |
| 118 | 5 October 2016 | Drunkcast [Part 1] |
| 118 | 5 October 2016 | Drunkcast [Part 2] |
| 118 | 5 October 2016 | Drunkcast [Part 3] |
| 118 | 6 October 2016 | Drunkcast [Part 4] |
| 119 | 12 October 2016 | Jack Gallagher |
| 120 | 19 October 2016 | John Bradley |
| 121 | 26 October 2016 | Dignity in Dying - Lloyd & Mick |
| 122 | 2 November 2016 | Geoff Lloyd |
| 123 | 9 November 2016 | Iain Lee |
| 124 | 14 November 2016 | UFC 205 Roundtable with Chris Glasson & Sam Marshall |
| 125 | 16 November 2016 | B. Dolan / Knowmore.org |
| 126 | 23 November 2016 | Distraction Pieces Network Special (Suzi Gage, Jim Smallman, Jason Reed) |
| 127 | 30 November 2016 | Lauren Laverne |
| 128 | 7 December 2016 | Robert Sheehan |
| 129 | 14 December 2016 | Michaela Coel |
| 130 | 21 December 2016 | Drunkcast Xmas Special [Part 1] |
| 130 | 23 December 2016 | Drunkcast Xmas Special [Part 2] |
| 130 | 26 December 2016 | Drunkcast Xmas Special [Part 3] |
| 130 | 28 December 2016 | Drunkcast Xmas Special[Part 4] |
| 131 | 4 January 2017 | Rob Parker |
| 132 | 11 January 2017 | Matt Willis |
| 133 | 18 January 2017 | James McAvoy |
| 134 | 25 January 2017 | Garth Jennings |
| 135 | 1 February 2017 | Homelessness Special [Part 1] - Mustard Tree |
| 135 | 1 February 2017 | Homelessness Special [Part 2] - Haircuts 4 Homeless |
| 136 | 8 February 2017 | Wim Hof |
| 137 | 15 February 2017 | Ancilla van de Leest |
| 138 | 22 February 2017 | Katherine Ryan |
| 139 | 1 March 2017 | Dave Johns |
| 140 | 8 March 2017 | Holly Ross (The Lovely Eggs) |
| 141 | 15 March 2017 | Dan Hardy |
| 142 | 17 March 2017 | Rory Macdonald |
| 143 | 22 March 2017 | Susie Wokoma |
| 144 | 29 March 2017 | James Buckley |
| 145 | 5 April 2017 | Drunkcast [Part 1] |
| 145 | 5 April 2017 | Drunkcast [Part 2] |
| 145 | 6 April 2017 | Drunkcast [Part 3] |
| 146 | 12 April 2017 | Polarbear (Steve Camden) |
| 147 | 19 April 2017 | Kelly Marcel |
| 148 | 26 April 2017 | Gemma Cairney |
| 149 | 3 May 2017 | Ask Pip [Part 1] |
| 149 | 3 May 2017 | Ask Pip [Part 2] |
| 150 | 10 May 2017 | Andrew "Beef" Johnston |
| 151 | 17 May 2017 | Huey Morgan |
| 152 | 24 May 2017 | Living Room Spoken Word |
| 153 | 31 May 2017 | Sofia Boutella |
| 154 | 7 June 2017 | Neil Fitzmaurice |
| 155 | 14 June 2017 | Christopher Fairbank [Part 1] |
| 155 | 14 June 2017 | Christopher Fairbank [Part 2] |
| 156 | 21 June 2017 | Goldie |
| 157 | 28 June 2017 | Child Soldiers with Wayne Sharrocks |
| 158 | 5 July 2017 | Destiny 2 Special |
| 159 | 12 July 2017 | Drunkcast [Part 1] |
| 159 | 12 July 2017 | Drunkcast [Part 2] |
| 159 | 13 July 2017 | Drunkcast [Part 3] |
| 160 | 19 July 2017 | Laura Dockrill |
| 161 | 26 July 2017 | Doc Brown |
| 162 | 2 August 2017 | Alice Lowe |
| Bonus | 3 August 2017 | Birthday Special |
| 163 | 9 August 2017 | Laurie Penny |
| 164 | 16 August 2017 | Sofie Hagen |
| 165 | 23 August 2017 | Ben & Jerry's Special - Rebecca & Melanie |
| 166 | 30 August 2017 | Aisling Bea |
| 167 | 6 September 2017 | Will Poulter |
| 168 | 13 September 2017 | Eddie Izzard |
| 169 | 20 September 2017 | Souad Mekhennet |
| 170 | 27 September 2017 | Hugo White of The Maccabees |
| 171 | 4 October 2017 | Helen Chamberlain |
| 172 | 11 October 2017 | Michael Fassbender |
| 173 | 18 October 2017 | Russell Howard |
| 174 | 25 October 2017 | Armando Iannucci |
| 175 | 1 November 2017 | S. Craig Zahler |
| 176 | 8 November 2017 | Live In Dublin [Part 1] |
| 176 | 8 November 2017 | Live In Dublin [Part 2] |
| 177 | 15 November 2017 | Jean Grae |
| Bonus | 17 November 2017 | Ask Pip [Part 1] |
| 178 | 22 November 2017 | Jonny Lee Miller |
| Bonus | 24 November 2017 | Ask Pip [Part 2] |
| 179 | 29 November 2017 | Rick Edwards |
| 180 | 6 December 2017 | Films Of The Year 2017 |
| 181 | 13 December 2017 | Alex Horne |
| 182 | 20 December 2017 | Drunkcast [Part 1] |
| 182 | 22 December 2017 | Drunkcast [Part 2] |
| 182 | 27 December 2017 | Drunkcast [Part 3] |
| 182 | 3 January 2018 | Drunkcast [Part 4] |
| 183 | 10 January 2018 | Lena Headey |
| 184 | 17 January 2018 | Paloma Faith |
| 185 | 24 January 2018 | Guz Khan |
| 186 | 26 January 2018 | We Need To Talk About Wrestling |
| 187 | 31 January 2018 | Vicky McClure |
| 188 | 7 February 2018 | Florence Pugh |
| 189 | 14 February 2018 | Don Letts |
| 190 | 21 February 2018 | Rutger Bregman |
| 191 | 28 February 2018 | Chris Ramsey |
| 192 | 7 March 2018 | Mother's Day Special |
| 193 | 9 March 2018 | Walk Like A Panther Special |
| 194 | 14 March 2018 | Steve McNeil |
| 195 | 21 March 2018 | Patrisse Cullors |
| 196 | 28 March 2018 | Top 5 Songs That Make You Cry [Part 1] |
| 196 | 28 March 2018 | Top 5 Songs That Make You Cry [Part 2] |
| 197 | 4 April 2018 | Allen Hughes & Jimmy Iovine |
| 198 | 11 April 2018 | Alexis Okeowo |
| 199 | 13 April 2018 | Charlotte Hatherley |
| 200 | 18 April 2018 | Jess Thom (Tourettes Hero) |
| 201 | 25 April 2018 | Cedric Bixler-Zavala |
| 202 | 2 May 2018 | Beans On Toast |
| 203 | 4 May 2018 | Nick Halkes |
| 204 | 9 May 2018 | Jamali Maddix |
| 205 | 11 May 2018 | Coralie Fargeat & Matilda Lutz |
| 206 | 16 May 2018 | Marc Goddard |
| 207 | 23 May 2018 | Angles 10th Anniversary w/Dan Le Sac [Part 1] |
| 207 | 23 May 2018 | Angles 10th Anniversary w/Dan Le Sac [Part 2] |
| 208 | 30 May 2018 | Martin Freeman |
| 209 | 6 June 2018 | Live @ Wells Comedy Festival |
| 210 | 8 June 2018 | Ask Pip (Portugal edition) |
| 211 | 13 June 2018 | Headway special with Natalie Clapshaw |
| 212 | 20 June 2018 | Jamie Demetriou |
| 213 | 27 June 2018 | Kate Nash |
| 214 | 4 July 2018 | Stephen Graham, Neil Fitzmaurice & Dan Cadan |
| 215 | 11 July 2018 | Joe Cole |
| 216 | 13 July 2018 | Stuart Whiffen |
| 217 | 18 July 2018 | Simon Pegg |
| 218 | 25 July 2018 | Dan Skinner (Angelos Epithemiou) |
| 219 | 1 August 2018 | Chilly Gonzales |
| 220 | 3 August 2018 | Birthday Party! |
| 221 | 8 August 2018 | Tony Law |
| 222 | 10 August 2018 | Why I Love Wrestling (Roundtable) with Russell Lissack, Sam Duckworth and Stuart Tourle |
| 223 | 15 August 2018 | Professor Green |
| 224 | 22 August 2018 | Example |
| 225 | 24 August 2018 | Spike Lee |
| 226 | 29 August 2018 | Bart Layton & Barry Keoghan |
| 227 | 5 September 2018 | Kae Tempest |
| 228 | 12 September 2018 | Drew Pearce |
| 229 | 19 September 2018 | Angel Giuffria |
| 230 | 23 September 2018 | Eddie Dennis |
| 231 | 26 September 2018 | Dominic Monaghan |
| 232 | 3 October 2018 | Josh Weller |
| 233 | 10 October 2018 | Desiree Akhavan |
| 234 | 17 October 2018 | Dr Kate Devlin |
| 235 | 19 October 2018 | Gizzi Erskine |
| 236 | 24 October 2018 | Epic Beard Men (Sage Francis & B. Dolan) |
| 237 | 31 October 2018 | Liam Howlett [Part 1] |
| 237 | 31 October 2018 | Liam Howlett [Part 2] |
| 238 | 7 November 2018 | Michaela Coel |
| 239 | 14 November 2018 | Michael "Venom" Page |
| 240 | 21 November 2018 | John Cooper Clarke |
| 241 | 23 November 2018 | Matt Palmer |
| 242 | 28 November 2018 | David Lowery |
| 243 | 5 December 2018 | Boots Riley |
| 244 | 12 December 2018 | Russell Kane |
| 245 | 19 December 2018 | Drunkcast [Part 1] |
| 245 | 20 December 2018 | Drunkcast [Part 2] |
| 245 | 26 December 2018 | Drunkcast [Part 3] |
| 245 | 2 January 2019 | Drunkcast [Part 4] |
| Bonus | 25 December 2018 | The King's Speech - Christmas Bonus |
| 246 | 9 January 2019 | Films of the Year 2018 |
| 247 | 16 January 2019 | Eddie Marsan |
| 248 | 23 January 2019 | Mark Millar |
| 249 | 25 January 2019 | Adam McKay |
| 250 | 30 January 2019 | Richard E. Grant |
| 251 | 6 February 2019 | Joel Edgerton |
| 252 | 13 February 2019 | Mary J. Blige |
| 253 | 15 February 2019 | Joe Cornish |
| 254 | 20 February 2019 | Lolly Adefope |
| 255 | 27 February 2019 | Stephen Merchant |
| 256 | 6 March 2019 | Steven Knight |
| 257 | 13 March 2019 | PC Leon McLeod |
| 258 | 20 March 2019 | Johann Hari |
| 259 | 22 March 2019 | Winston Duke |
| 260 | 27 March 2019 | Jayde Adams |
| 261 | 3 April 2019 | Jamie East |
| Bonus | 5 April 2019 | Secret Club Bonus |
| 262 | 10 April 2019 | Ron Perlman |
| 263 | 17 April 2019 | Zawe Ashton |
| 264 | 24 April 2019 | Nish Kumar |
| 265 | 1 May 2019 | Ed Gamble |
| 266 | 8 May 2019 | Tim Clare |
| 267 | 12 May 2019 | ME Awareness Special w/ Jason Reed |
| 268 | 15 May 2019 | Norman Cook AKA Fatboy Slim |
| 269 | 22 May 2019 | Dexter Fletcher |
| 270 | 29 May 2019 | Jo Hartley |
| 271 | 5 June 2019 | Nick Helm |
| 272 | 7 June 2019 | Two idiots talking MMA in Greggs (with Stu Whiffen) |
| 273 | 12 June 2019 | Mark Grist & Ross Sutherland |
| Bonus | 17 June 2019 | DPP Flashback - Refugee Week Special w/ Ramelle (Ep. 42) |
| 274 | 19 June 2019 | Jed Mercurio |
| 275 | 26 June 2019 | Charlie Brooker |
| 276 | 3 July 2019 | Danny Boyle |
| 277 | 10 July 2019 | Inua Ellams |
| 278 | 17 July 2019 | Konnie Huq |
| 279 | 24 July 2019 | Greg Jenner |
| 280 | 31 July 2019 | Cariad Lloyd |
| 281 | 7 August 2019 | Matt Richards |
| 282 | 14 August 2019 | Sara Pasoce |
| 283 | 18 August 2019 | Stu Wiffen & Adam Richardson |
| 284 | 21 August 2019 | Joseph Gilgun |
| 285 | 28 August 2019 | Serge Pizzorno |
| 286 | 4 September 2019 | Tez Ilyas |
| 287 | 11 September 2019 | Frank Turner |
| 288 | 18 September 2019 | Kano |
| 289 | 25 September 2019 | Louis Theroux |
| 290 | 2 October 2019 | Jack Sexsmith [Part 1] |
| 290 | 2 October 2019 | Jack Sexsmith [Part 2] |
| 291 | 9 October 2019 | Ricky Wilson |
