= Kid Carpet =

British musician

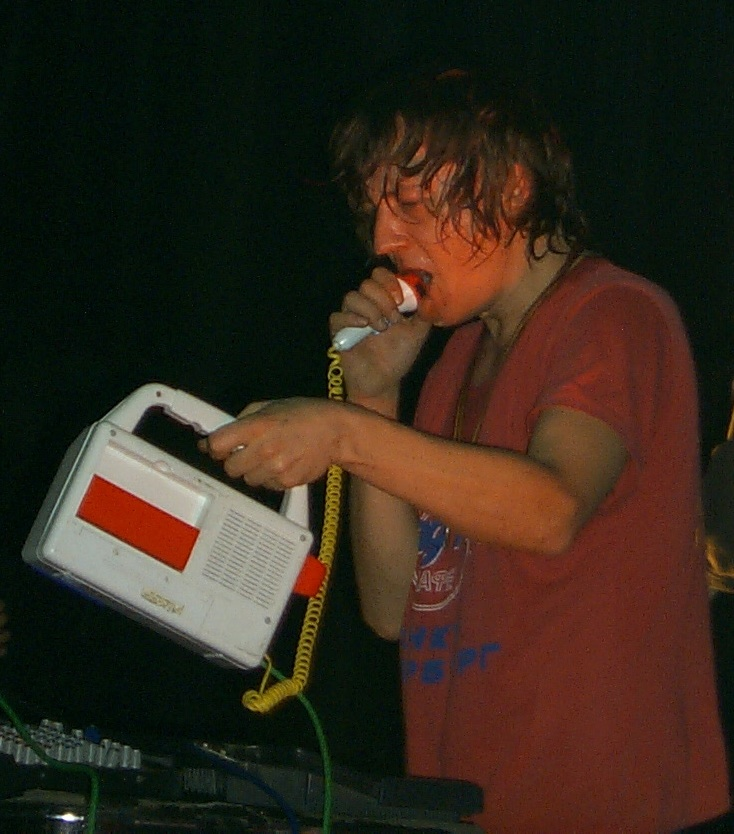
Kid Carpet, March 2007

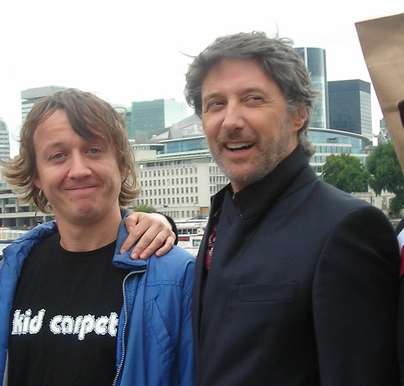
Singer Kid Carpet (left) and Antoine de Caunes (right) in London

Kid Carpet (born Ed Patrick) is a musician from Bristol, England. His music is recorded in his home studio using instruments such as samplers, Casio keyboards, and various children's toys including plastic Fisher-Price guitars and Tamagotchi innards.

== Career ==
Kid Carpet made his live debut at Bristol's Watershed Media Centre in May 2003 and has since toured with well-known acts including Willy Mason, Badly Drawn Boy, Mylo, The Go! Team, Arcade Fire, Dan Le Sac Vs Scroobius Pip and The Trachtenburg Family Slideshow Players. He was signed to the independent label Tired & Lonesome, who released his debut album, Ideas and Oh Dears in 2005. After the album release, he appeared on BBC Radio 1's Battle Of The One Man Bands. His second album, Casio Royale, was released on Rob da Bank's record label Sunday Best on 30 June 2008. He makes an appearance on Dan Le Sac Vs Scroobius Pip's song "Cowboi" from 2010 album The Logic Of Chance. His third album, which contains his sound track work from Alex Cox's film Repo Chick was released on dan le sac's Dumb Drum Records label in 2011.

== Discography ==
Albums

- Ideas And Oh Dears (2005 / Tired & Lonesome Records) (versions bought from independent record stores are accompanied by an additional CD, featuring Kid Carpet remixes and various interludes)
- Casio Royale (2008 / Sunday Best Records)
- The Advert Break (2010 / Self Release)
- Songs From Repo Chick (2011 / Dumb Drum Records)
- The Castle Builder (2016 / Kid Carpet)

Singles

- "Your Love" (2005 / Tired & Lonesome Records)
- "Shiny Shiny New" (2005 / Tired & Lonesome Records)
- "Carrier Bag" (2005 / Tired & Lonesome Records)
- "I Don't Wanna Fall in Love With You" (2008 / Sunday Best Records)
- "Make it Look Good" (2008 / Sunday Best Records)
- "Hitting the Wall" (2008 / Sunday Best Records)

EPs

- Shit Dope EP (2005 / Self Release)
- The Kid's Back EP (2007 / Tired & Lonesome Records)
- Shuffle Remix EP (2011 / Dumb Drum Records)
- Dogmeat EP (2016)
