= Sharrock =

Sharrock or Sharrocks is an English language surname. It may refer to:

- Chris Sharrock (born 1964), British musician
- Alfred Burgess Sharrocks (1919–1988), British artist
- George Sharrock (1910–2005), American politician
- Ivan Sharrock (born 1941), British sound engineer
- John Sharrock (born 1944), Australian football player
- Linda Sharrock (born 1947), American singer
- Robert Sharrock (1630–1684), British clergyman and botanist
- Sonny Sharrock (1940–1994), American musician
- Thea Sharrock (born 1976), British theatre director
- Wayne Sharrocks (born 1965), British writer
- William Sharrock (1742–1809), British bishop

== Television ==
- "Sharrock (Space Ghost Coast to Coast)", an episode of Space Ghost Coast to Coast

== See also ==
- Shorrock
