= Kitty, Daisy & Lewis =

British five-piece band

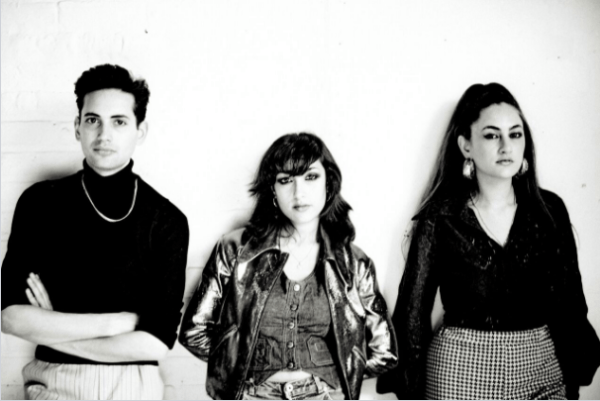

Background information
- Origin: London, England
- Genres: R&B; soul; punk; ska; blues
- Years active: 2000–present
- Label: Sunday Best
- Website: kittydaisyandlewis.com

Kitty, Daisy & Lewis are a British band fronted by the siblings of the Durham family. Their music is influenced heavily by R&B, blues, soul, punk, rock and roll, and West Indian music. They are all multi-instrumentalists playing guitar, piano, bass, drums, harmonica, banjo, lapsteel guitar, ukulele, xylophone, accordion, and more between them. Kitty, Daisy & Lewis have sold over a quarter of a million records worldwide.

Kitty Durham is the youngest of the group and primarily sings and plays drums, guitar, harmonica, ukulele, and banjo. Daisy Durham, the eldest, primarily sings and plays drums, piano, accordion and xylophone. Lewis Durham sings and plays guitar, piano, banjo, lapsteel, and drums. The band are renowned for building their own recording studio, which consists of mostly vintage analogue equipment and custom in-house built equipment. Their first two albums were recorded in the back room of their mother's house. In 2011, they began building their professional recording studio in Camden Town, known as Durham Sound Studios, where they recorded The Third (2015) and Superscope (2017). They've produced all their own recordings apart from The Third which was co-produced by Mick Jones.

They have opened for Coldplay, Razorlight, Stereophonics, Richard Hawley, and others.

The band are signed to former BBC Radio 1 DJ and Bestival curator Rob da Bank's label, Sunday Best, who released their second single "Mean Son of a Gun" with the B-side "Ooo Wee" which they first heard on a 78 rpm record sung by Louis Jordan. This was released on 45 rpm, CD and a limited-edition 78 rpm vinyl. The tracks were recorded at their home. The master lacquers were also cut by Lewis using his own equipment at The Exchange Mastering Studios, which is owned and run by his father, Graeme.

On 30 May 2011, Smoking in Heaven was released on CD and vinyl (double LP and 78 rpm album), also on Sunday Best. On 26 January 2015, Kitty, Daisy & Lewis The Third was released. Their fourth album, Superscope, was released on 29 September 2017.

== Background ==
The Durham family is of Anglo-Indian, part Norwegian, and part Romanian heritage.

== Touring ==
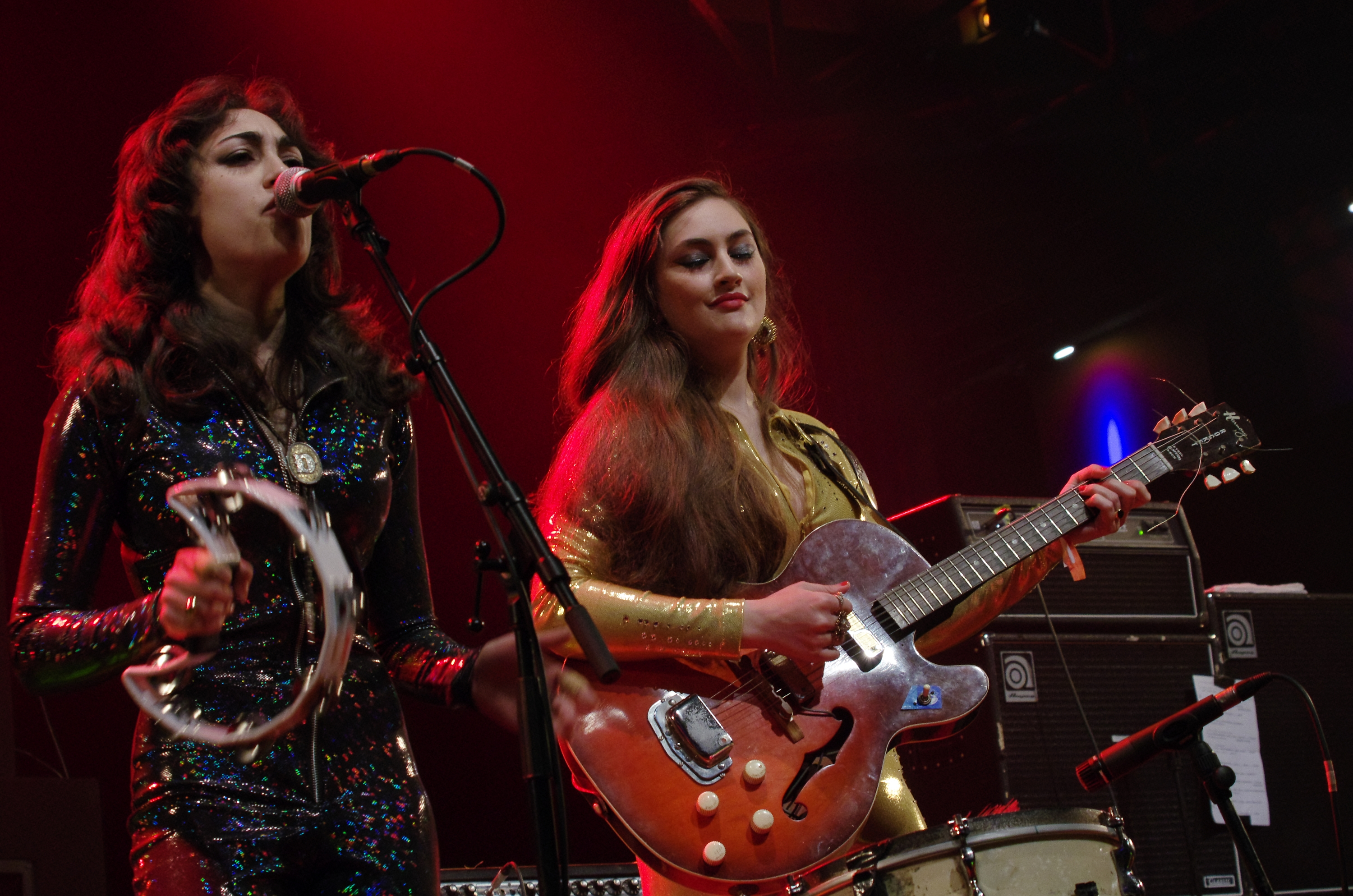
Daisy (headless tambourine) and Kitty (guitar) performing at Traumzeit festival, Germany, in 2014

Kitty, Daisy & Lewis have supported artists such as Jools Holland, Mika, Billy Bragg, Stereophonics, Mark Ronson and Razorlight at London's Earls Court Arena.

They played the main stage at Bestival in 2006, 2007, 2008, 2009, 2011, 2014, 2015 and 2016 as well as playing four times at Glastonbury in 2007, 2008, 2011 and 2015. They have featured in Vogue and performed on Blue Peter.

When performing live, their parents Graeme Durham and Ingrid Weiss play guitar and bass. Graeme Durham is a founding member and mastering engineer at The Exchange recording studios in London, and Ingrid Weiss is the former drummer of The Raincoats and was encouraged to play the bass by Kitty, Daisy & Lewis. Legendary Jamaican trumpeter "Tan Tan" (Eddie Thornton) has played on all live shows since 2008 and featured on most records.

Kitty, Daisy & Lewis were one of the opening acts in North America for Coldplay's Viva La Vida Tour.

They were featured in the 2009 Primavera Sound in Barcelona, Rock Am Ring and Rock Im Park in Germany, and Lowlands in the Netherlands. In July 2010 they played on Thursday night of Latitude Festival in the Cinema Tent. In August 2010 they played Belladrum Tartanheart Festival. In August 2011 they opened for Phish at The Gorge outside of Seattle, Washington and on the first of July 2012, they played at the Rock Werchter festival in Belgium.

== Media appearances ==
The band appears in the 2009 film Last Chance Harvey, playing their song "Mean Son of a Gun". They appear in the German film Dinosaurier – Gegen uns seht ihr alt aus!. This also featured four of their songs from the debut album.

Their 2008 self-titled album received a positive review from The Times, who said "the vibe is irresistible". Their singles "(Baby) Hold Me Tight" and "Buggin' Blues" were released on 15 December 2008. "Going Up the Country" was also used in the closing credits of Welcome to the Rileys and in the film Beautiful Kate.

In 2013 they appeared on season 11 of Dragons Den as part of Joe Walter's pitch for Original Jerky (renamed Texas Joes). A song was written called Put That Jerky In Your Mouth, for which a music video was also recorded.

The trio appeared on Live from Daryl's House, 28 May 2015.

== Discography ==
=== Albums ===
- A–Z of Kitty, Daisy & Lewis: The Roots of Rock 'n' Roll (2007, compilation album featuring one song by the trio)
- Kitty, Daisy & Lewis (2008, Sunday Best) UK No. 149
- Kitty, Daisy & Lewis (2009, DH Records, US only)
- Smoking in Heaven (2011) UK No. 145, AUS No. 96
- The Third (2015) AUS No. 82
- Superscope (2017)

=== Singles ===
- "Honolulu Rock and Roll" (2005)
- "Mean Son of a Gun" (2006)
- "Going Up the Country" (2008)
- "(Baby) Hold Me Tight" (2008)
- "I'm So Sorry" / "I'm Going Back" (2011)
- "Messing with My Life" (2011)
- "Don't Make a Fool Out of Me" (2011)
- "Baby Bye Bye" (2015)
- "No Action" (2015)
- "Feeling of Wonder" / "Whenever You See Me" (2015)
- "Down on My Knees" (2017)
- "Black Van" (2017)
- "Slave" (2017)
- "Just One Kiss" (live Christmas version) (2017)
- "Silent Night" (2018)
- "Signed, Sealed, Delivered (I'm Yours)" (2019)
