= Rise & Fall (Michael Molloy and Alex Evans song) =

Single by Michael Molloy & Alex Evans
- Released: 26 April 2013
- Genre: Singer/songwriter
- Length: 4:16
- Label: Sunday Best Recordings
- Songwriter(s): Michael Molloy

"Rise & Fall" is a song by Michael Molloy and Alex Evans. It was released in the United Kingdom as a digital download on 26 April 2013. As of 5 May 2013 it had reached number 38 on the UK Singles Chart.

== Background ==
The song was recorded by Michael Molloy before he died in September 2012 following a coach crash on the way home from Bestival. The single has received support from Brian May, James Morrison, Wayne Rooney and Joey Barton. It was released by the organisers of Bestival, Sunday Best, on their label Sunday Best Recordings. Michael's brother Joe Molloy said:

It was Michael’s ambition to have his music recognised by the wider world. He never fulfilled that ambition so we, his family, are fulfilling it for him. Michael can never come back and we will never cease to grieve for him. We think about him every hour of every day. But Michael’s passion for music and his talent was one of the qualities which defined him and we want the rest of the world, through his music, to understand and appreciate in a small way just what a special human being he was. The release of the single is both in memoriam and in celebration and we wish to thank Sunday Best and all of the people who have supported Michael over many years. They know who they are.

Bestival organiser and Radio 1 DJ Rob da Bank said:

It’s obvious to me that Michael was a young and rare talent and that music was an extremely important part of his life. I’ve heard he absolutely loved Bestival and had a great time at Bestival 2012 so I feel privileged to be able to help his family fulfil his and their ambition of getting Michael’s music out there.

== Track listing ==
Digital download
No.	Title	Length
1.	"Rise & Fall"	4:16
2.	"Hope You Know"	3:17

== Chart performance ==
The song reached number 26 on the Official Chart Update, before entering the UK Singles Chart at number 38 on 5 May 2013.

=== Weekly charts ===
Chart (2013)	Peak position
UK Singles (OCC)	38

== Release history ==
Region	Date	Format	Label
United Kingdom	26 April 2013	Digital download	Sunday Best Recordings
