= Mburu =

Mburu is a surname of Kenyan origin. Notable people with the surname include:

- Beth Mburu-Bowie (born 1987), English musician
- Kenneth Mburu Mungara (born 1973), Kenyan marathon runner and four-time Toronto Waterfront Marathon champion
- Stanley Waithaka Mburu (born 2000), Kenyan long-distance runner
