= Dan le Sac vs Scroobius Pip =

Band

Dan le Sac Vs Scroobius Pip
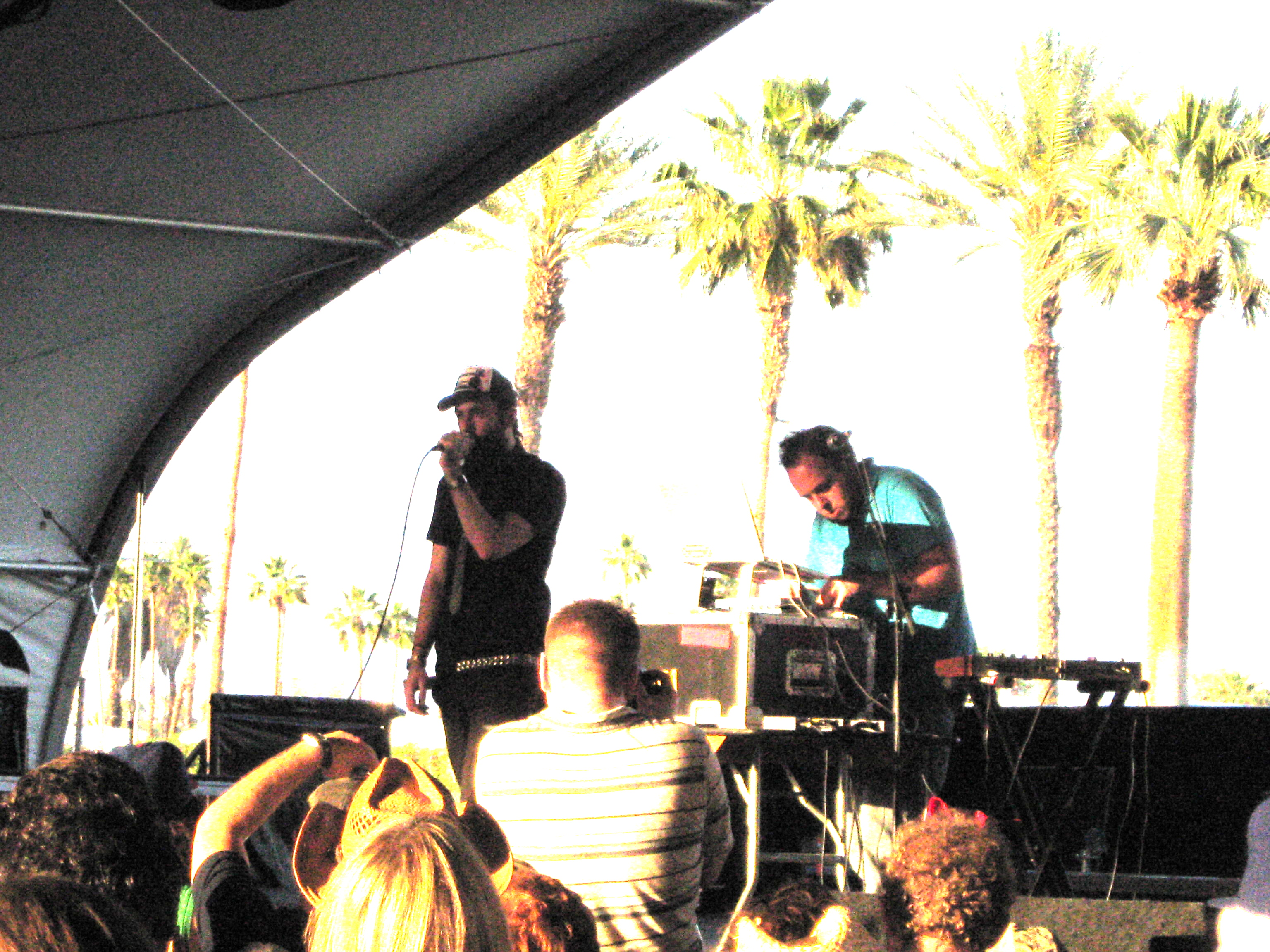
- Scroobius Pip (left) and dan le sac (right) at Coachella

Background information
- Origin: Stanford-le-Hope, England
- Genres: Electronic, hip-hop
- Years active: 2007–2014
- Labels: Sunday Best Recordings, Strange Famous Records
- Members: dan le sac Scroobius Pip
- Website: Dan le Sac site Scroobius Pip site

Dan le Sac Vs Scroobius Pip were a hip-hop duo, combining electronic beats with sung, spoken, and rapped lyrics. The pair are Daniel Stephens (a.k.a. Dan le Sac; production, programming, keyboards, guitars and backing vocals), and David Peter Meads (b.1981) (a.k.a. Scroobius Pip; vocals/rapper/poet). The name "Scroobius Pip" is an intentional misspelling of the Edward Lear poem "The Scroobious Pip".

Dan le Sac originally hails from Corringham and Scroobius Pip from neighbouring Stanford-le-Hope in Essex.

Their first single was "Thou Shalt Always Kill". Signed by the Sunday Best record label, Dan le Sac Vs Scroobius Pip released their debut album in 2008. Titled Angles, it reached 31 in the UK album chart. They released their second album entitled The Logic of Chance on 15 March 2010 on Sunday Best. Scroobius Pip released his debut solo album, entitled Distraction Pieces, on 19 September 2011 – while Dan le Sac released his, Space Between the Words, on 9 July 2012. The duo's third album entitled Repent Replenish Repeat was released 7 October 2013 and debuted at number 22 in the UK top 40, the duo's highest album chart position to date.

== History ==
Both Dan le Sac and Scroobius Pip worked as solo artists before forming this duo, Dan le Sac as a laptop musician, DJ and promoter, Scroobius Pip as a spoken word artist.

David Meads began writing poetry in about 2005; he adopted the pseudonym "Scroobius Pip" from Edward Lear's poem "The Scroobious Pip". In a 2010 interview with Beatdom, Meads explained why he chose the name: "I loved the story. It's about a creature that doesn't know what it is ...By the end [of the poem] he realises that he is simply The Scroobious Pip. He doesn't fit into any one category and can just be his own creature."

The duo formed in 2006 after Dan le Sac booked Scroobius Pip to play at a gig he was promoting at the Fez Club (now Sakura) in Reading. Around this time Dan le Sac started remixing Scroobius Pip's solo album No Commercial Breaks – a selection of the remixes form the core of their debut album, Angles – but the band didn't garner any commercial success until they wrote the original song "Thou Shalt Always Kill" at the end of 2006. Although it is commonly thought that Rob Da Bank of BBC Radio 1 gave the band their first radio play, it was actually John Kennedy of XFM London - the band sent a demo CD to John Kennedy in December 2006 and he played it on his Xposure show within two hours of receiving it.

"Thou Shalt Always Kill" was re-released in 2009 with additional vocals by Pos Plug Won (Posdnuos) of De La Soul. In 2007 the duo released two singles on Lex Records, "Thou Shalt Always Kill" and "The Beat that my Heart Skipped" but it wasn't until early 2008 that they signed for Rob da Bank's Sunday Best record label and released their debut album Angles; the album was later released on Sage Francis's Strange Famous Records in the US and Traffic in Japan.

On Christmas Eve 2007, whilst still unsigned, the duo released a free download of "Letter From God To Man" which includes a sample of Radiohead's "Planet Telex". To promote this, the duo created and posted a spoof video on YouTube showing the pair auditioning for The X Factor in front of Simon Cowell, Sharon Osbourne and Louis Walsh. A montage of clips of judges' comments are added to their profanity-laden performance of what Scroobius Pip says is "'It Ain't No Fun' by Snoop Dogg, featuring Warren G, Nate Dogg and Kurupt." The clip, titled "Le Sac Vs Pip Letter from X-factor", was featured in "The 10 Best Clips of the Month" in the October 2008 edition of Q magazine. The video also included a voice over from Zane Lowe.

They have also appeared on the BBC's Sound and NBC's Last Call with Carson Daly, with Scroobius Pip appearing by himself on the BBC's Newsnight Review and Setanta Sport Channel, as well as being interviewed and performing live on Stephen Merchant's show on BBC 6 Music.

They spent 2009 recording their second studio album, The Logic of Chance which was released in March 2010, preceded by the single "Get Better".

In September 2011 Scroobius Pip released his second solo album, Distraction Pieces, through the label Strange Famous Records (USA) and Scroobius Pip's own Speech Development Records (UK). It debuted at #35 in the UK album charts.

In 2011, a portrait of Scroobius Pip was painted by British artist Joe Simpson, the painting was exhibited around the UK including a solo exhibition at The Royal Albert Hall.

In July 2012 Dan le Sac released his debut solo album, Space Between the Words, on Sunday Best Records. The album features collaborations with B. Dolan, Sarah Williams White, Emmy the Great, Fraser Rowan, Joshua Idehen, HowAboutBeth, Merz and Pete Hefferan from British indie band Pete and the Pirates

In February 2014, Dan le Sac vs Scroobius Pip performed another UK tour, stopping off in Belfast, Northern Ireland on Valentine's Day.

In September 2014, Scroobius Pip announced that he and Dan le Sac had played their last show together, marking the end of their 8-year musical partnership.

== Music and influences ==
The duo's music includes hip-hop, electronica, and pop. On the duo's Facebook page they cite many influences including Sage Francis, Gil Scott-Heron, Chilly Gonzales, KRS-One, Rakim, Atmosphere, Purple Ronnie (although Scroobius Pip has stated that this is an intentional untruth), Joy Division, Kraftwerk, Clark, El-P, Gorecki, Devendra Banhart, Beta Band, and Mogwai.

== Live gigs and tours ==
Since March 2007, they have undertaken multiple UK, US and European tours. The band have also appeared at the Glastonbury Festival '07, '09, '10, '11 and '14, Reading and Leeds Festival '07 and '08, Lounge on the Farm '09, Bestival '07, '08, '09, '10, '13 and '14 Camp Bestival '08, '09 and '10 Beat-Herder festival in '10, Lowlands '08 and '10, Pukkelpop, Fuji Rock Festival, Coachella, Monolith Festival, Dour Festival, Pohoda festival '10, Electric Picnic '10, Beach Break Live '10, Greenbelt Festival '09, Play Fest '12, and Y Not '13. They played their first headline festival slot at 2000trees '11. On 4 May 2014 they headlined at YO1 Festival in York alongside De La Soul, Sub Focus and Pulled Apart by Horses.

== Remixes ==
Dan le Sac also works as a remix producer, he has to date been commissioned to remix Biffy Clyro, Bat for Lashes (feat Scroobius Pip), Eddy Temple Morris's Losers (feat Riz Ahmed (AKA Riz Mc) and Envy), The Maccabees, King Blues (feat Scroobius Pip), Dub Pistols, This is Radio Freedom, Micachu, Tired Irie, Playdoe, Producers with Computers, and Yila. He has undertaken unsolicited remixes of Elastica, Radiohead, Florence and the Machine, Joy Division, Tricky and Bob Dylan.

== Discography ==
=== Albums ===
Year	Album	UK	UK Indie	Label	Notes
2008	Angles	#31	#1	UK: Sunday Best Recordings; US: Strange Famous Records	
2010	The Logic of Chance	#43	–	Sunday Best Recordings	
2013	Repent Replenish Repeat	#22		UK: Sunday Best Recordings; US: Strange Famous Records	Released 7 October 2013

=== Singles ===
Year	Single	UK	UK Indie	AUS	Notes
2007	"Thou Shalt Always Kill"	34	–	69	–
2007	"The Beat That My Heart Skipped"	85	–	–	–
2007	"Letter From God To Man"	–	–	–	free download
2008	"Look for the Woman"	72	1	–	–
2008	"Letter From God To Man" (Re-Release)	170	8	–	
2009	"Thou Shalt Always Kill [De La Edit]"	116	–	–	featuring Pos Plug Won of De La Soul
2010	"Get Better"	–	–	–	–
2010	"Great Britain" / "Sick Tonight"	–	–	–	double-A side
2010	"Cauliflower"	–	–	–	featuring Kid A
2013	"Stunner"	–	–	–	free download
2013	"Gold Teeth" (feat. Flux Pavilion)	–	–	–	
2013	"You Will See Me"	–	–	–	2013 Christmas single

Dan le Sac Solo Releases

Year	Album	UK	UK Indie	Label	Notes
2007	Lesacsayyeah!	–	–	self-released	50 copies
2011	Good Time Gang War Vol. 1	–	–	Dumb Drum Records	live album; 100 copies
2012	Space Between the Words	–	–	Sunday Best Records	
2016	Cherished, Overthrown [06-16]	–	–	Dumb Drum Records	
2017	Subsurface Circular OST	–	–	Dumb Drum Records	Soundtrack to the Mike Bithell game of the same name.
2018	Quarantine Circular OST	–	–	Dumb Drum Records	Soundtrack to the Mike Bithell game of the same name.
2018	63 Days	–	–	Dumb Drum Records	
2019	The Death of Me EP	–	–	Dumb Drum Records	
2020	Promise of a New Life EP	–	–	Dumb Drum Records	
2020	Scattershot EP	–	–	Dumb Drum Records	
2020	These People Are Idiots	–	–	Dumb Drum Records	
2021	Arcsmith OST	–	–	Dumb Drum Records	Soundtrack to the Mike Bithell game of the same name.
2023	Tron: Identity OST	–	–	Walt Disney Records	
2025	Tron: Catalyst OST	–	–	Walt Disney Records	

==== Scroobius Pip solo albums ====
See Scroobius Pip for complete listing.
