= Max Sedgley =

- Born: Maxwell Cadien Sedgley
- Genres: Electronic, trip hop, nu-funk
- Occupations: Producer, DJ
- Years active: 2004–present
- Label: Sunday Best

Max Sedgley is a British producer, multi-instrumentalist and disc jockey, currently signed to the independent record labels Sunday Best (founded by Rob da Bank), Jalapeno Records and Om Records. In 2004, Sedgley released his first single, "Happy", a remix of which was later used by ITV as the theme music to their coverage of the Euro 2004 football tournament, was featured in the EA Sports game FIFA Street as well as in a promotional advert for Super Mario Galaxy. It has also been used on adverts for Ambrosia and Bacardi Rum. It reached No. 30 on the UK Singles Chart in July 2004.

== Education ==
Sedgley was educated at Dulwich College, a boarding independent school for boys in Dulwich, in South London. Between the ages of 10 and 13, he studied percussion under James Blades. At the University of Edinburgh he studied composition, orchestration, percussion and piano, and graduated with a degree in classical music.

== Life and career ==
On 17 July 2006, Sedgley released his 10-track debut album, From the Roots to the Shoots, on the Sunday Best label, which contained the singles "Slowly", "The Devil Inside", (which both featured guest Z-Star on lead vocals) and "Happy".

On 6 September 2010, Sedgley released his second album, Suddenly Everything, on Jalapeno Records, which contained the singles "Soundboy" featuring Tor, "Something Special" and "Superstrong" featuring Tasita D'mour.

He has played drums for many electronic musicians, most notably Roni Size.

In 2023, Sedgley released his fourth studio album Shedonism featuring long-time collaborator, vocalist Tasita D'Mour.

Sedgley tours as both a DJ and in a five-piece musical ensemble, Max Sedgley and the Shoots. The band consists of Max Sedgley (drums, percussion, keyboards), Tasita D'mour (lead vocals), Mike Buchanan (guitar, lead and backing vocals), Andy ("V") Valentine (guitar, lead and backing vocals) and Marcus Dods (bass guitar).

== Discography ==
Year	Title	Format	Label
2004	"Happy"	12", CD	Sunday Best Recordings
2005	"Devil Inside"	12", CD	Sunday Best Recordings
2006	"Celebrity"	12" single	Sunday Best Recordings
2006	"From the Roots to the Shoots"	CD	Sunday Best Recordings
2006	"Slowly"	12", CD	Sunday Best Recordings
