= The Third (Kitty, Daisy & Lewis album) =

Kitty, Daisy & Lewis the Third

Studio album by Kitty, Daisy & Lewis
- Released: 31 March 2015
- Genre: Rock
- Length: 43:05
- Label: Sunday Best

Kitty, Daisy & Lewis chronology
Smoking in Heaven (2011)	Kitty, Daisy & Lewis the Third (2015)

Professional ratings
Aggregate scores
Source	Rating
Metacritic	65/100
Review scores
Source	Rating
Clash	(8/10)

The Third is the third studio album by English trio Kitty, Daisy & Lewis. It was released in March 2015 under Sunday Best Recordings.

== Track listing ==
No.	Title	Length
1.	"Whenever You See Me"	4:00
2.	"Baby Bye Bye"	5:14
3.	"Feeling of Wonder"	3:06
4.	"No Action"	4:14
5.	"Good Looking Woman"	3:08
6.	"Turkish Delight"	4:11
7.	"It Ain't Your Business"	2:26
8.	"Ain't Always Better Your Way"	3:09
9.	"Never Get Back"	4:48
10.	"Bitchin' in the Kitchen"	2:39
11.	"Whiskey"	3:41
12.	"Developer's Disease"	2:28
13.	"I Should Have Known" (bonus track)	3:45

== Charts ==
Chart (2015)	Peak position
Belgian Albums (Ultratop Flanders)	45
Belgian Albums (Ultratop Wallonia)	85
Dutch Albums (Album Top 100)	80
French Albums (SNEP)	94
German Albums (Offizielle Top 100)	26
Swiss Albums (Schweizer Hitparade)	89
UK Independent Albums (OCC)	21
