= Thou Shalt Always Kill =

"Thou Shalt Always Kill'"

Single by Dan Le Sac Vs Scroobius Pip

from the album Angles
- Released: 16 April 2007
- Genre: Electronic, spoken word
- Length: 5:19
- Label: Lex
- Songwriter(s): Dan Le Sac, Scroobius Pip

Dan Le Sac Vs Scroobius Pip singles chronology
| "Thou Shalt Always Kill'" (2007) | "The Beat That My Heart Skipped" (2007) |

"Thou Shalt Always Kill" is the debut single by Dan le Sac Vs Scroobius Pip, released in 2007.

The song comprises an electronic dance beat with the vocals taking the form of a rant at aspects of modern British culture. The pivotal message is to "think for yourselves" rather than to follow current trends or get caught up in hype. The artists claim that the title, and final line of the song, refer to 'killing' as performing excellently in the Hip Hop vernacular.

The song was named NME's track of the week in an April 2007 issue, despite the lyric "thou shalt not read NME" appearing in the song.

The track was released for digital download on 2 April 2007 followed by 7" vinyl on 16 April, reaching number 30 on the UK Singles Chart. It entered and peaked at #34 in the official UK singles chart. The stand-alone download of Angles reached position #193 on the official UK Top 200.

The song was re-released in 2009 with additional vocals by Pos Plug Won of De La Soul.

== Track listing ==
- Limited edition 7" vinyl
1. "Thou Shalt Always Kill"
2. "Repetitive generic music" (locked groove)
3. "Thou Shalt Always Kill" (Knifehandchop rmx)
- Australian CD single
1. "Thou Shalt Always Kill" (Radio Edit)
2. "Thou Shalt Always Kill" (Chris Fraser Remix Edit)
3. "Thou Shalt Always Kill" JFKK (Jono Fernandez & Kid Kenobi Remix)
4. "Thou Shalt Always Kill" (Stafford Brothers Remix)
5. "Thou Shalt Always Kill" (Chris Fraser Remix)
6. "Thou Shalt Always Kill" (The Heat Remix)
7. "Thou Shalt Always Kill" (Rhysmix Remix)
8. "Thou Shalt Always Kill" (Original)
- Digital download
1. "Thou Shalt Always Kill"
2. "Thou Shalt Always Kill" (Knifehandchop rmx)
3. "Angles"

=== Re-release ===
- Limited edition 7" vinyl
1. "Thou Shalt Always Kill" (De La Edit) Feat. Posdnous of De La Soul
2. "Thou Shalt Always Kill" (Original Demo)
- Limited edition 12" vinyl
1. "Thou Shalt Always Kill" (K-Tee & Friction Remix) Feat. Posdnous of De La Soul
- Digital download
1. "Thou Shalt Always Kill" (De La Edit) Feat. Posdnous of De La Soul
2. "Thou Shalt Always Kill" (Drop the Lime Remix) Feat. Posdnous of De La Soul
3. "Thou Shalt Always Kill" (Sunday Best Dub) Feat. Posdnous of De La Soul
4. "Thou Shalt Always Kill" (Losers Remix) Feat. Posdnous of De La Soul
5. "Thou Shalt Always Kill" (K-Tee & Friction Remix) Feat. Posdnous of De La Soul
6. "Thou Shalt Always Kill" (Original Demo)

== Charts ==
Chart performance for "Thou Shalt Always Kill"
| Chart (2007) | Peak position |
|---|---|
| Australia (ARIA) | 69 |
| Australian ARIA Club Chart | 1 |
| UK Singles (OCC) | 34 |
