= Space Between the Words =

Studio album by Dan Le Sac
- Released: 9 July 2012
- Genre: Electronic, hip hop
- Length: 50:55
- Label: Sunday Best Recordings
- Producer: Dan Le Sac

Singles from Space Between the Words
- 1. "Play Along" Released: 18 May 2012; 2. "Memorial" Released: 16 July 2012; 3. "Long Night of Life" Released: 19 October 2012

Professional ratings
Review scores
Source	Rating
BBC	(favorable)
Consequence of Sound	(C+)
NME	(6/10)
PopMatters	5/10 stars

Space Between the Words is the first solo album by Dan Le Sac, released on Sunday Best Recordings in 2012.

== Track listing ==
No.	Title	Length
1.	"Long Night of Life" (featuring Merz)	4:20
2.	"Play Along" (featuring Sarah Williams White)	3:57
3.	"Memorial" (featuring Emmy the Great)	4:58
4.	"Reprisals"	1:16
5.	"Tuning" (featuring Joshua Idehen)	5:06
6.	"Good Time Gang War" (featuring B. Dolan)	4:32
7.	"Hold Yourself Lightly"	2:44
8.	"Zephyr" (featuring Merz)	4:59
9.	"Breathing Underwater" (featuring Fraser Rowan)	3:56
10.	"Break of Dawn" (featuring HowAboutBeth)	3:45
11.	"Caretaker" (featuring B. Dolan and HowAboutBeth)	5:11
12.	"Beside"	1:37
13.	"Cherubs" (featuring Pete Hefferan)	4:35
