= Beth Mburu-Bowie =

- Also known as: HowAboutBeth, Beth Pipette
- Born: 25 April 1987 (age 39)
- Origin: London, England
- Genres: Baroque pop, indie pop, IDM, alternative, anti-folk, pop
- Years active: 2005–present

Beth Mburu-Bowie, better known by her stage name HowAboutBeth, is an English artist, songwriter and trustee.

== Early life ==
Mburu-Bowie was born in Kenya and grew up in London. Her aunt, Dr. Wanjiru Kihoro, was an influential economist, writer and feminist activist.

Between 2005 and 2008 she trained and worked with the English National Opera project The WORKS, for which she composed four pieces that were performed at venues such as the London Coliseum. In 2005, Asian Dub Foundation sampled one of her choir pieces for their track "Who Runs The Place" from their album Tank.

Mburu-Bowie became trustee of the Roundhouse in April 2008. At the time of her nomination she was the youngest member to join the board of trustees. During her work for the Roundhouse she chaired youth advisory and got to perform with artists such as Pink Floyd, Hugh Masekela and Madness.

== Collaborative work ==
In 2009, Mburu-Bowie joined The Pipettes as a member, touring and recording with Martin Rushent. She supported The Heavy as a vocalist on their European tour.

In 2011, she performed with Dan Le Sac vs Scroobius Pip after recording vocals for Dan Le Sac's solo debut Space Between Words. She is credited as a lead vocalist on two songs on the album, including the lead single "Caretaker".

In 2012, after meeting Andrew Butler of Hercules and Love Affair, she joined the group as a touring member. In August that year she played Meltdown festival, performing "Blind" in a duet with Antony and The Johnsons in her only live performance of the song since its recording.

Mburu-Bowie joined Friendly Fires as a vocalist for their Pala tour, which culminated in the band's headlining show at Bestival in September 2012. In the same year, she performed with Thumpers for their early live gigs across the UK.

In 2014, Metronomy invited Mburu-Bowie to record background vocals on the band's fourth album Love Letters, which reached no. 7 on the UK Albums Charts.

In 2015, she contributed vocals to the song "Squeeze" on South London producer My Panda Shall Fly's fourth album Too, released via Project Mooncircle. The music publication Off The Tracks described Squeeze as "Everything But The Girl on the one hand (this is so pleasant, though never unctuously polite) and the grimier Ghostpoet on the other".

== Solo work ==
Mburu-Bowie's solo work as HowAboutBeth has been described as "off-kilter contemporary roots pop" and has gained her comparisons to Björk and Kate Bush.

She was listed by Belgian blog On-Point as one to watch for making "brilliant, original music in 2010" alongside Ty, Micachu, Tokimonsta and others.

In 2012, two of her songs, "Running" and "Robot Boy", were awarded Record of the Day by the music platform Record of the Day.

Her song "English Girls Love Jade", published via Muphoric Sounds, incorporates lyrics of a Kikuyu folk song that her Grandmother used to sing to her as a child.
