= The Scroobious Pip =

Nonsense verse poem by Edward Lear

"The Scroobious Pip" is a nonsense verse poem left unfinished by Edward Lear at the time of his death in 1888.

== Premise ==
The poem tells of a fanciful animal of unknown taxonomy known only as "the Scroobious Pip" and the fruitless attempts of the other animals of the world to classify it.

== History ==
In 1872, Lear began work on "The Scroobious Pip", but it was unfinished by the time of his death.

In 1935, the poem, which had not been previously published, was released as a collectors' edition, of which 950 copies were printed.

In 1968, the poem was completed by American poet Ogden Nash, who had been asked to finish the work. His contributions were accompanied by illustrations by Nancy Ekholm Burkert and printed together in a large elephant folio format.

Harvard University Press published Teapots And Quails, a small book of Lear's poetry that includes "The Scroobious Pip".

== Influence and legacy ==
The poem's title was adopted as the stage name of a UK hip hop performance artist, Scroobius Pip, who is one half of the duo Dan le Sac Vs Scroobius Pip.

== See also ==
- Edward Lear
- Literary nonsense
- Ogden Nash

== Bibliography ==
- Marco Graziosi (8 October 2012). "Edward Lear - The Scroobious Pip - from Teapots and Quails". Edward Lear Home Page.
