= Repent Replenish Repeat =

Studio album by Dan le Sac vs Scroobius Pip
- Released: 7 October 2013
- Genres: Hip-hop, electronic
- Labels: Sunday Best (UK), Strange Famous (US)

Dan le Sac vs Scroobius Pip chronology
The Logic of Chance (2010)	Repent Replenish Repeat (2013)

Singles from Repent Replenish Repeat
- 1. "Stunner" Released: 2013

Professional ratings
Aggregate scores
Source	Rating
Metacritic	66/100
Review scores
Source	Rating
Clash	6/10
The Independent	3/5 stars
MusicOMH	2/5 stars
State	3/5 stars

Repent Replenish Repeat is the third and final studio album by Dan le Sac Vs Scroobius Pip, released on 7 October 2013. It peaked at number 22 on the UK Albums Chart.

== Critical reception ==
At Metacritic, which assigns a weighted average score out of 100 to reviews from mainstream critics, the album received an average score of 66% based on 5 reviews, indicating "generally favorable reviews".

Peter Adkins of Clash gave the album a 6 out of 10, calling it "their most mixed work to date." Meanwhile, Fintan Burke of State said, "it's good to see them bring their individual efforts together to fortify what is nevertheless a competent return to form."

== Track listing ==
No.	Title	Length
1.	"Stunner"	3:58
2.	"Nightbus Sleepers"	3:26
3.	"Terminal"	4:18
4.	"Heroism"	3:27
5.	"Porter"	5:01
6.	"Kickstarter"	1:57
7.	"Gold Teeth" (featuring Flux Pavilion)	3:24
8.	"Entity"	3:17
9.	"Stiff Upper Lip" (featuring Itch)	3:34
10.	"You Will See Me"	5:35

UK edition does not include "Kickstarter".

== Charts ==
Chart	Peak position
UK Albums (OCC)	22
