= The Logic of Chance =

Studio album by Dan le Sac vs Scroobius Pip
- Released: 15 March 2010
- Genres: Hip-hop, electronic
- Length: 44:54
- Label: Sunday Best
- Producer: dan le sac

Dan le Sac vs Scroobius Pip chronology
Angles (2008)	The Logic of Chance (2010)	Repent, Replenish, Repeat (2013)

Singles from The Logic of Chance
- 1. "Get Better" Released: 22 February 2010; 2. "Sick Tonight"/"Great Britain" Released: 31 May 2010; 3. "Cauliflower" Released: 11 October 2010

Professional ratings
Review scores
Source	Rating
BBC	(positive)
Robert Christgau	(A−)
Daily Telegraph	3/5 stars
Drowned in Sound	2/10 stars
MusicOMH	2/5 stars
Q	3/5 stars
The Skinny	3/5 stars

The Logic of Chance is the second album by dan le sac vs Scroobius Pip, released on 15 March 2010. The name of the album was taken from the title of a book by John Venn, the inventor of the Venn diagram.

== Track listing ==
All lyrics are written by Scroobius Pip; all music is composed by dan le sac, except where noted.

The Logic of Chance
No.	Title	Lyrics	Music	Length
1.	"Sick Tonight"	Scroobius Pip	dan le sac	4:03
2.	"Five Minutes"			3:49
3.	"Cauliflower (featuring dan le sac, Kid A)" (Lyrics by dan le sac & Scroobius Pip)			2:53
4.	"Great Britain"			2:52
5.	"Get Better"			4:55
6.	"Inert Explosions"			4:19
7.	"Stake a Claim"			4:32
8.	"The Beat" (Lyrics by dan le sac & Scroobius Pip)			5:00
9.	"Last Train Home"			4:44
10.	"Snob"			4:00
11.	"Cowboi" (Music by dan le sac & Kid Carpet, lyrics by Kid Carpet & Scroobius Pip)			3:47

The Logic of Chance (iTunes Edition)
No.	Title	Length
1.	"Sick Tonight"	4:03
2.	"Five Minutes"	3:49
3.	"Cauliflower"	2:53
4.	"Great Britain"	2:52
5.	"Get Better"	4:55
6.	"Inert Explosions"	4:19
7.	"Stake a Claim"	4:32
8.	"The Beat"	5:00
9.	"Last Train Home"	4:44
10.	"Snob"	4:00
11.	"Cowboi"	3:47
12.	"The Astounding Earnest Brace"	5:20

The Logic of Chance (Japanese Edition)
No.	Title	Length
1.	"Sick Tonight"	4:03
2.	"Five Minutes"	3:49
3.	"Cauliflower"	2:53
4.	"Great Britain"	2:52
5.	"Get Better"	4:55
6.	"Inert Explosions"	4:19
7.	"Stake a Claim"	4:32
8.	"The Beat"	5:00
9.	"Last Train Home"	4:44
10.	"Snob"	4:00
11.	"Cowboi"	3:47
12.	"Rich vs Poor"	4:40
13.	"Get Better (Errors Remix)"	4:41

The track "Cauliflower" features an American female singer who performs under the pseudonym Kid A. The track "Cowboi" features Bristol-based musician Kid Carpet.
