= Shorrock =

Shorrock is a surname. Notable people with the surname include:

- Arthur Gostick Shorrock, British Baptist missionary
- Christopher Shorrock, joint inventor of the Shorrock supercharger
- Eccles Shorrock, British cotton mill owner
- Glenn Shorrock, Australian singer, a founder of Little River Band
- Tim Shorrock, American writer and commentator on foreign policy, national security and politics
- Will Shorrock, English footballer

== See also ==
- Anthony Shorrocks, British economist
- Ernest Shorrocks, British cricket player
- Jake Shorrocks, English rugby league footballer
