= Jess Thom =

British artist and comedian

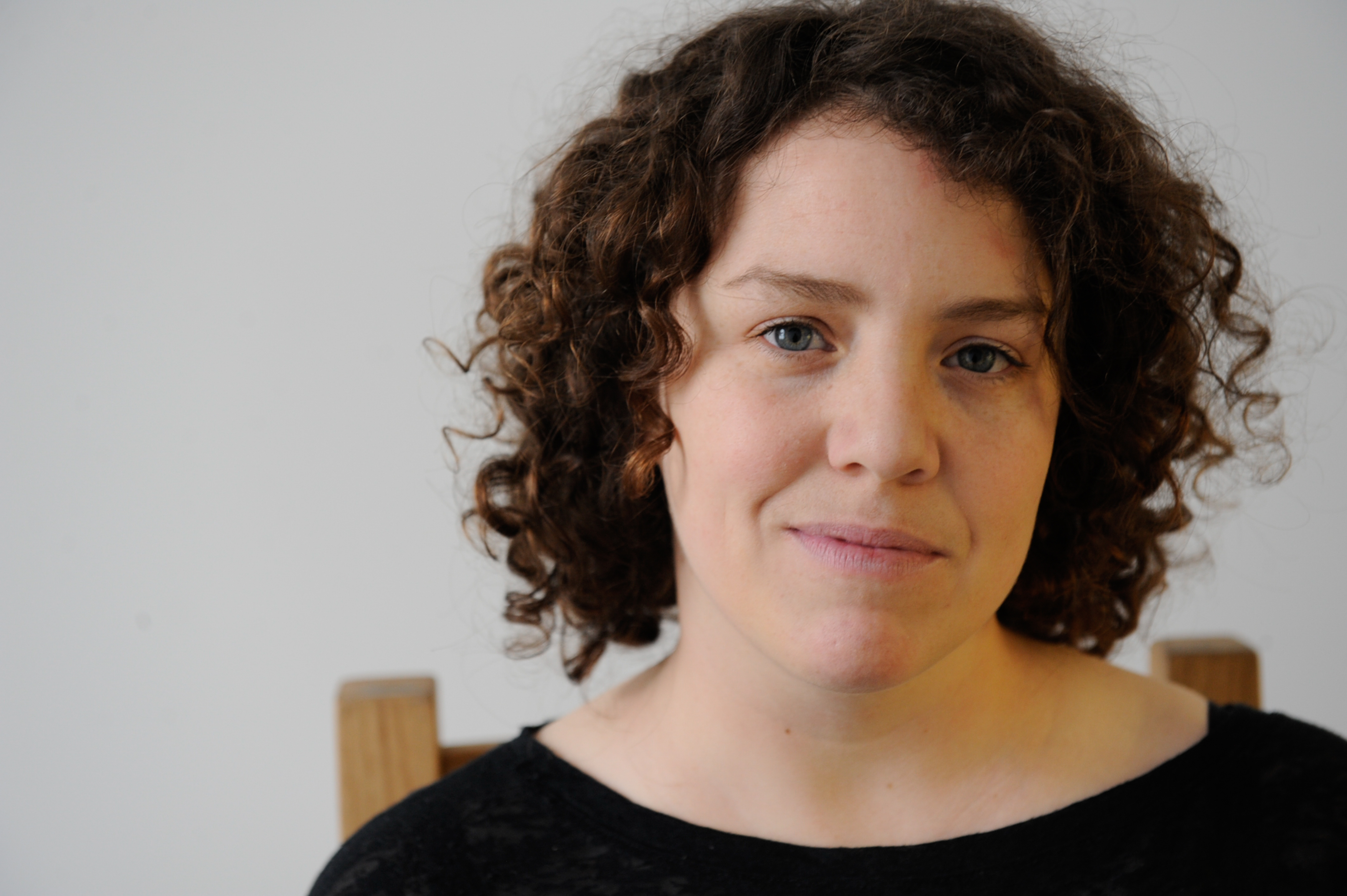
- Thom in 2011
- Born: Jessica Thom; 14 July 1980 (age 46); London, England
- Education: Royal College of Art
- Known for: Theatre, Comedy
- Movement: Disability art
- Awards: Total Theatre Award, Best Emerging Company

Jessica Thom (born 14 July 1980) is a British theatre-maker and comedian who established Touretteshero, an alter-ego and project aimed at increasing awareness of Tourette syndrome, the neurological condition which she was diagnosed with in her early twenties. The first Touretteshero production, Backstage in Biscuit Land debuted at Edinburgh Fringe Festival in 2014. The show won critical acclaim and has since toured across the UK and internationally, including various performances across North America and Australia.

Thom has made numerous appearances on British television, notably an interview on Russell Howard's Good News which has garnered more than 995,000 YouTube views as of August 2019, and was reported on by The Independent and Metro newspapers.

== Early and personal life ==
Thom was born in London. She experienced vocal and physical tics throughout her childhood as a result of Tourette's syndrome, but was not diagnosed with the condition until her early twenties. Thom has recurring vocal tics, the most common of which is the word 'biscuit' which she can utter up to 16,000 times a day. She has a younger sister, who Jess previously referred to as 'Fat Sister' in a vocal tic whilst she was dieting. Thom acknowledges that her condition presents challenges but seeks to avoid 'self-pity or mockery' and to 'celebrate the creativity and humour of Tourette's'.

According to guidance notes for journalists written by the team at Touretteshero, and published by the Guardian:

Although some aspects of [Tourette's Syndrome] are challenging, Jess does not describe herself as a 'Tourette's sufferer' under any circumstances. Instead she likes to be referred to as a 'person with Tourette's' or as simply as 'having Tourette's'. She is 'brave' for all sorts of reasons, but not because she is disabled.

Thom has stated that she finds herself talking about and explaining Tourette's every day in her day-to-day interactions: "It doesn't always feel like a choice, more a tool for living...Often this is very functional, like explaining at the start of a phone call that I have Tourettes, answering a question or addressing sniggers on public transport."

Thom regularly experiences discrimination as a result of having Tourette's. She has recounted one particularly bad experience in multiple interviews, when she went to see comedian Mark Thomas perform at Tricycle Theatre. Other audience members complained about the noise she was making as a result of her vocal tics and the venue's staff asked her to move into a sound booth, so she wouldn't be heard by other customers. Although initially the experience made her vow never to go to the theatre again, it eventually became the catalyst for her becoming a performer: "The creative way to respond was to occupy that space as an artist".

Thom is also a wheelchair user. Following the social model of disability, Thom sees most of the challenges she faces not as a result of her unique neurology and physical impairment, but as a result of the 'disabling barriers' created by society, telling BBC News in 2014: "My wheelchair and my tics are not the thing that disables me; the thing that disables me is the inaccessible environment".

Thom studied at the Royal College of Art, London, graduating in 2005.

== Career ==
=== Early career ===
Prior to becoming a theatre-maker and performer, Thom's career began as a playworker, working with children and young people. She has also been a fundraiser and project coordinator at a charity based in south London.

=== Touretteshero ===
In 2010, Thom and longstanding friend and collaborator Matthew Pountney co-founded Touretteshero. The idea started out as a way of engaging people with the creative and humorous side of Tourette's, with Thom dressing up in a superhero costume and delivering performances and workshops, especially to children and young people. In 2011, Thom appeared on Episode 3, 'Uses and Abuses' of Stephen Fry's five-part BBC series Fry's Planet Word, to discuss her Tourette's and coprolalia - the involuntary use of swear words which 10% of people with Tourette's experience.

In 2012, Souvenir Press published Welcome to Biscuit Land: A year in the life of Touretteshero based on entries on Thom's blog, for which Fry wrote the foreword. Touretteshero has also put on creative events, like 'We Forgot The Lot!' - a collaboration with Tate for children and young people with and without Tourette's. Touretteshero worked with the Battersea Arts Centre to help them become the world's first "relaxed venue" in February 2020. This followed several relaxed performances and events held there, including the Festival of Rest and Resistance and Not I.

=== Backstage in Biscuit Land ===
Partly inspired by her negative experience of attending the Mark Thomas gig, and taking its name from Thom's most common vocal tic 'biscuit', Backstage in Biscuit Land began development as a theatre piece which explores the creative opportunities of Thom's tics and also other people's reaction to them. In 2013, Thom met performer and puppeteer, Jess Mabel Jones at a performance of Beauty and the Beast by ONEOFUS (Mat Fraser and Julie Atlas Muz) in London.

Mabel Jones later became a lead collaborator on Backstage in Biscuit Land. Mabel Jones's role in this 'one-woman show for two' is to make sure Thom doesn't stray too far off topic. Due to Thom's unique and sporadic ticcing, which is riffed on heavily in the show, no two performances are quite the same. The set for the show features 50 items that were the subjects of some of Thom's spontaneous vocal tics during the development cycle, including a 'babygrow for Les Dennis' and 'ducks dressed as pterodactyls'.

Backstage in Biscuit Land received R&D funding from commissioning body Unlimited, but crowdfunding was sought to help bring the show to Edinburgh Fringe Festival. Reviews of the initial run at Edinburgh were very positive. Lyn Gardiner in The Guardian said: "Jess Thom's condition lends her show an absurdist edge Samuel Beckett would be proud of...Tourette's and theatre make a joyous combo". She also described it as "extraordinarily entertaining" awarding it four stars. Alice Jones in The Independent said: "The humour is black but it's also daft and uplifting, and in places, impossibly moving". TV Bomb, were perhaps most effusive with their praise declaring: "There are more ideas and imagination in this one hour show than most of the Fringe programme combined," awarding it 5 out of 5.

Following its success at Edinburgh, Backstage in Biscuit Land went on a tour across the UK throughout 2015 and 2016 including a notable performance at the Barbican, London. It continued to pick up glowing reviews with The Stage awarding it four stars and calling the show "a properly joyous thing, funny, informative, and eloquent about the need for theatre to be more accessible to everyone. Broadway Baby also awarded the show 4 stars "This show is one big tasty biscuit all right".

Later in 2016 the production went international with a tour of North America which included performances at New York's BRIC, Toronto's Harbourfront, San Francisco's International Arts Festival and Los Angeles' Skirball Cultural Center. Performances in Australia included at the Sydney Opera House, Queensland Performing Arts Centre, Brisbane and Melbourne International Festival. The performance at the latter earned the show 4 stars in the Australian edition of The Guardian, with Steph Harmon describing at as "unpredictable, joyous, must-watch theatre".

=== Media appearances ===
Thom appeared on ITV's This Morning in May 2012 and was interviewed at length by Phillip Schofield and Holly Willoughby. In March 2013, Thom appeared on RTE's Saturday Night Show with Brendan O'Connor. In September of that year, Thom delivered a talk about the misconceptions of Tourette's Syndrome at TEDxAlbertopolis, the first TED event to take place at London's Royal Albert Hall. Following her appearance on Fry's Planet Word in 2014, Thom appeared on Radio 4's The Today Programme, discussing Tourette's and BBC News discussing her ideas about 'freedom' later that year.

In October 2015, Thom was interviewed on BBC's Russel Howard's Good News, with the broadcast apparently reaching some 3 million people. The next month a version of Backstage in Biscuit Land, adapted for television entitled Broadcast from Biscuit Land had a 30-minute slot on BBC4's Live from Television Centre, the first live broadcast from Television Centre since the building was decommissioned in 2013. In 2016, Thom appeared on series 10 of Richard Herring's Leicester Square Theatre Podcast. A behind-the-scenes look at Jess Thom's experience in developing Not I was created for BBC Two, in Me, My Mouth and I.

== Awards ==
Touretteshero won the 2014 Total Theatre Award, Best Emerging Company for Backstage in Biscuit Land.

== Disability activism ==
Thom is an outspoken advocate of disabled people's rights. Her personal outlook often inverts the typical negative stereotypes associated with disability, for instance she sees her Tourette's as a source of creativity and her wheelchair as a symbol of freedom. She advocates for empowerment of disabled people via the social model of disability, telling Exeunt:

As a society there are still lots of people who think about disability solely in negative terms. The medical model – 'disabled people are broken and need to be fixed' – and the charity model – 'tragic and in need of help' – are ways of conceptualizing disability that remain widespread even though the social model of disability – 'people are disabled by a failure to consider difference' – underpins our legislation and public services.

Following her own negative experiences of attending the theatre, Thom has campaigned to get more 'relaxed performances' (a performance where the audience are allowed to make noise and move around, which is more suitable for certain neurodiverse people) in theatres, as well as making every performance of Backstage in Biscuit Land a relaxed performance. Thom has also been an outspoken critic of the UK Government's cuts to provision for disabled people, telling Disability Arts Online:

So many of the structures that were in place to support disabled people to live independent lives have been dismantled in recent years. Ambitions are being capped because of the structures designed to disable and limit what we have access to. There is a big difference between having basic needs met and having the right to an independent life. With the abolition of the Independent Living Fund and Access to Work and all the other attacks on disabled peoples' rights our only option is to keep fighting.

== Political views ==
In December 2019, along with 42 other leading cultural figures, Thom signed a letter endorsing the Labour Party under Jeremy Corbyn's leadership in the 2019 general election. The letter stated that "Labour's election manifesto under Jeremy Corbyn's leadership offers a transformative plan that prioritises the needs of people and the planet over private profit and the vested interests of a few."
