= Distraction Pieces =

Studio album by Scroobius Pip
- Released: 19 September 2011
- Genres: Hip-hop, spoken word, rap rock
- Length: 35:55
- Labels: Speech Development (UK), Strange Famous Records (US)
- Producers: Danny Lohner, Scroobius Pip, Worgie, Yila, Zane Lowe, Aupheus, Steve Mason

Scroobius Pip chronology
No Commercial Breaks (2006)	Distraction Pieces (2011)

Singles from Distraction Pieces
- 1. "Let 'Em Come" Released: 11 September 2011; 2. "The Struggle" Released: 30 October 2011

Professional ratings
Review scores
Source	Rating
BBC	(favorable)
Drowned in Sound	(5/10)
MusicOMH	(unfavorable)

Distraction Pieces is the second solo album by Scroobius Pip, released on 19 September 2011. It entered and peaked at No. 35 on the UK albums chart.

== Track listing ==
No.	Title	Lyrics	Producer(s)	Length
1.	"Introdiction"	Scroobius Pip	Danny Lohner	3:27
2.	"Let 'Em Come" (featuring P.O.S and Sage Francis)	Scroobius Pip, P.O.S, Sage Francis	Scroobius Pip, Worgie, Yila	4:43
3.	"Domestic Silence"	Scroobius Pip	Worgie, Yila	3:58
4.	"Try Dying"	Scroobius Pip	Scroobius Pip, Worgie, Yila	2:59
5.	"Death of the Journalist"	Scroobius Pip	Zane Lowe, Yila	5:11
6.	"Soldier Boy (Kill 'Em)" (featuring B. Dolan)	Scroobius Pip, B. Dolan	Aupheus, Worgie, Yila	3:05
7.	"The Struggle"	Scroobius Pip	Steve Mason	4:13
8.	"Broken Promises"	Scroobius Pip	Worgie, Yila	5:02
9.	"Feel It" (featuring Natasha Fox)	Kate Bush	Yila	3:17
