= Angles (Dan Le Sac vs Scroobius Pip album) =

Studio album by dan le sac vs Scroobius Pip
- Released: 12 May 2008
- Recorded: November 2007
- Genres: Hip-hop, electronic
- Length: 57:23
- Labels: Sunday Best Recordings (UK), Strange Famous Records (USA)
- Producers: dan le sac, Yila

dan le sac vs Scroobius Pip chronology
| Angles (2008) | The Logic of Chance (2010) |

Singles from Angles
- 1. "Thou Shalt Always Kill" Released: 9 April 2007; 2. "The Beat That My Heart Skipped" Released: 17 September 2007; 3. "Look for the Woman" Released: 28 April 2008; 4. "Letter from God to Man" Released: 28 July 2008; 5. "Thou Shalt Always Kill (De La Edit)" Released: 26 January 2009

Professional ratings
Review scores
| Source | Rating |
|---|---|
| Drowned in Sound | 1/10 |
| The Guardian | 3/5 stars |
| NME | (7/10) |
| Okayplayer | (88/100) |
| Pitchfork | (0.2/10) |
| PopMatters | 7/10 stars |
| The Skinny | 4/5 stars |
| Spin | 7/10 |
| Sputnikmusic | 4.5/5 |
| The Times | 3/5 stars |

Angles is the debut album by dan le sac vs Scroobius Pip, released on 12 May 2008 in the United Kingdom and 2 September 2008 in the United States. It entered and peaked at #31 on the UK album chart. Most of the album was recorded in a friend of Scroobius Pip's shed in Essex and dan le sac's back bedroom.

== Track listing ==
All lyrics are written by Scroobius Pip; all music is composed by dan le sac, except where noted.

Angles
| No. | Title | Length |
|---|---|---|
| 1. | "The Beat That My Heart Skipped" | 5:13 |
| 2. | "Development" | 3:57 |
| 3. | "Look for the Woman" | 4:04 |
| 4. | "Rapper's Battle" | 3:27 |
| 5. | "Tommy C" | 4:26 |
| 6. | "Fixed" (Music by dan le sac & Billy Squier) | 3:28 |
| 7. | "Angles" | 3:57 |
| 8. | "Letter from God to Man" (Music by dan le sac & Colin Greenwood, Edward O'Brien, Jonathan Greenwood, Phillip Selway, Thomas Yorke) | 3:57 |
| 9. | "Magician's Assistant" | 4:39 |
| 10. | "Back from Hell" | 3:14 |
| 11. | "Thou Shalt Always Kill" | 5:18 |
| 12. | "Waiting for the Beat to Kick In..." (also includes the hidden track "Reading My Dreams") | 11:37 |

Also released was an iTunes Bonus Video Version with a shortened version of "Waiting for the Beat to Kick In...", and the track "Reading My Dreams" was used as a separate track.

Angles (iTunes Bonus Video Version)
| No. | Title | Length |
|---|---|---|
| 1. | "The Beat That My Heart Skipped" | 5:13 |
| 2. | "Development" | 3:57 |
| 3. | "Look for the Woman" | 4:04 |
| 4. | "Rapper's Battle" | 3:27 |
| 5. | "Tommy C" | 4:26 |
| 6. | "Fixed" | 3:28 |
| 7. | "Angles" | 3:57 |
| 8. | "Letter from God to Man" | 3:57 |
| 9. | "Magician's Assistant" | 4:39 |
| 10. | "Back from Hell" | 3:14 |
| 11. | "Thou Shalt Always Kill" | 5:18 |
| 12. | "Waiting for the Beat to Kick In..." | 6:53 |
| 13. | "Reading My Dreams" | 4:30 |
| 14. | "First Time We Met Musik (Demo)" | 4:12 |
| 15. | "Thou Shalt Always Kill (Video)" | 3:18 |
| 16. | "Look for the Woman (Video)" | 4:00 |

When the album was released in the United States by Strange Famous Records, it had a different track listing.

Angles (US Version)
| No. | Title | Length |
|---|---|---|
| 1. | "The Beat That My Heart Skipped" | 5:14 |
| 2. | "Development" | 3:57 |
| 3. | "Thou Shalt Always Kill" | 5:18 |
| 4. | "Back from Hell" | 3:14 |
| 5. | "Look for the Woman" | 4:04 |
| 6. | "Fixed" | 3:28 |
| 7. | "Rappers Battle" | 3:37 |
| 8. | "Letter from God to Man" | 3:57 |
| 9. | "First Time We Met Musik" | 4:12 |
| 10. | "Tommy C" | 4:26 |
| 11. | "Angles" | 3:57 |
| 12. | "Magician's Assistant" | 4:39 |
| 13. | "Waiting for the Beat to Kick In..." | 14:11 |
| 14. | "Thou Shalt Always Kill (Video)" |

== Production notes ==
- "Fixed" features a sample from Dizzee Rascal's "Fix Up, Look Sharp", which itself is a sample of Billy Squier's "The Big Beat".
- "Letter from God to Man" features a sample from Radiohead's song "Planet Telex", a song featured on the album The Bends. It was also made available as a free download from the band's MySpace website on Christmas Day, 2007.
