= Wayne Sharrocks =

English author

Wayne Sharrocks (born 1965) is an English author of psychological thrillers. He was born in Camden, London and had a career in animal welfare after university. In 2005 he secured a 3 book publishing contract with Pegasus Books. He started to write novels whilst living in Blo Norton on the Norfolk/Suffolk border. His first book Redemption published in 2006 was nominated for both the McKitterick Prize and Guardian First Book Award. His second, Dominion was published in 2007, with Kismet on worldwide release in 2010.
