= Camp Bestival =

Music festival in Dorset, England

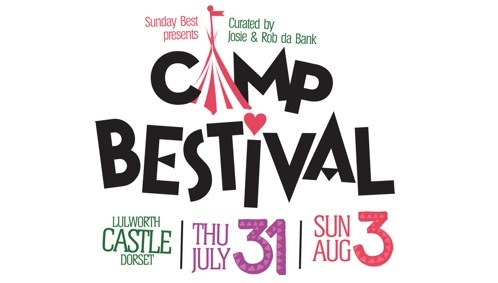
- Camp Bestival, 2014 Logo
- Genre: Indie/Dance
- Dates: Summer – July, August (4 days)
- Locations: Dorset, England
- Years active: 2008–2019, 2021–present
- Capacity: 10,000
- Website: www.campbestival.net

Camp Bestival is a British music festival, the "little sister" of Bestival, both organised by BBC Radio 1 DJ Rob Da Bank. It is held annually, in July, at Lulworth Castle in Dorset and is targeted at families with small children. In 2019 it had a capacity of 10,000. It won the Best New Festival award from the UK Festival Awards in 2008 and Best Family Festival in 2009, 2010, 2013 and 2014.

In 2018 Camp Bestival went into administration, leaving many workers unpaid. However, a festival of the same name, curated by Rob da Bank and his wife Josie, took place in 2019, at the same site and on the equivalent weekend.

== 2008 ==
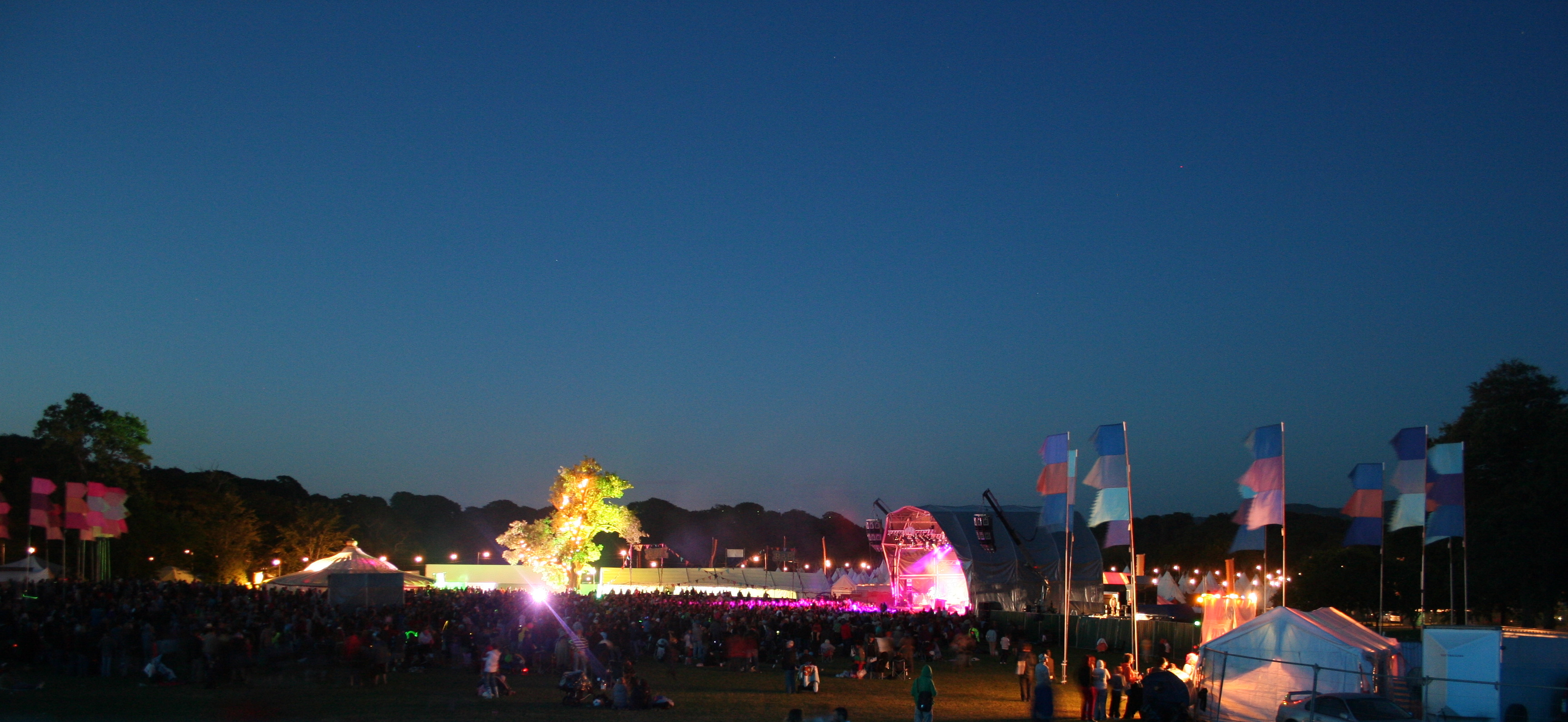
2008 Camp Bestival at night

The first Camp Bestival in 2008 included headliners Chuck Berry, Flaming Lips, Kate Nash, Billy Bragg, DJ Yoda, Kevin Rowland, Eliza Doolittle and Black Kids, but was troubled by the overcrowding of the campsites leading to many people camping by their cars in the nearby carparks.

The theme was 'Mad Hatter's Tea Party.

== 2009 ==
The 2009 festival, held over the weekend 24–26 July, included musical performances by Florence and the Machine, PJ Harvey - in her only UK solo appearance of the year, Chic, Will Young, Tinchy Stryder, VV Brown, Kid Creole and the Coconuts, Mercury Rev, Goldie Lookin' Chain, Wild Beasts, Roots Manuva, Candi Staton, Bon Iver, Phoenix, Alessi's Ark, Alela Diane, Micachu and the Shapes, Golden Silvers, Seth Lakeman and Laura Marling. Comedians appearing included Frankie Boyle, Marcus Brigstocke, Lee Mack and Michael "Atters" Attree. Other events included a barn dance, a show by the English National Ballet, and Hugh Fearnley-Whittingstall's River Cottage tent.

Changes from the previous year included a late-night Silent Disco to avoid waking children, and the number of toilets were tripled.

The theme was Animal Magic.

== 2010 ==
The line-up for Camp Bestival 2010 included Madness, Calvin Harris, Billy Bragg, The Human League, Lee "Scratch" Perry and The Cuban Brothers. The festival was held over the weekend of 30 July to 1 August.

The theme was Fairy Tales.

== 2011 ==
The 2011 Festival has now been extended to allow campers to arrive from the Thursday lunchtime, after complaints about the long time needed to get on site caused some festival-goers to miss some of the Friday attractions in 2010.

Headliners for 2011 are confirmed as Blondie, Mark Ronson and the Business International and Primal Scream who will be performing the Screamadelica album in its entirety in celebration of its 20-year anniversary. Other performers include ABC, The Wonder Stuff, House of Pain, Eliza Doolittle, Bad Shepherds, Easy Star All-Stars and Ed Sheeran.

Comedy performers include Marcus Brigstock, Milton Jones, Marcus Walsh and Jack Whitehall whilst there will be spoken word from Laura Dockrell, Simon Day and Sam Leith plus a continuation of the popular "How to..." series with speakers including Howard Marks.

Family entertainment included Mr Tumble, live performances of The Gruffalo and Shrek: The Musical and "100 Free things for Kids".

The theme was Medieval.

== 2012 ==
2012 Camp Bestival had an Olympic theme following the London 2012 Olympic games. The 2012 headliners included Kool and the Gang, Chic featuring Nile Rodgers, Hot Chip, The Happy Mondays, Rizzle Kicks, Stooshe and Rolf Harris. Other entertainment included Jimmy Carr, Mr Tumble and Russel Kane plus entertainment from The Gruffalo Live, and Shrek the Musical.

== 2013 ==
The 2013 Festival was held over the first four days in August and themed 'around the world'. This year featured the addition of the dance space and science tent but the removal of the 'Little Big Top'.

Headliners included Richard Hawley, Levellers and Labrinth, Other performers included DJ Fresh, The Farm, Kid Creole and the Coconuts, Mark Owen and Gabrielle Aplin. This year also featured a world record attempt for the most paper aeroplanes flying at once in support of the new Disney/Pixar movie Planes.

Other performers included London Grammar, JAWS, The 1975 and Clean Bandit.

== 2014 ==
Camp Bestival 2014 ran from 31 July to 3 August and had the theme of "Circus". The festivals 2014 headliners were Basement Jaxx, De La Soul and James.

Other acts and artists appearing across the weekend included Johnny Marr, Sinéad O'Connor, Pop Will Eat Itself, Laura Mvula, Steve Mason, The Skatalites, Peter Hook & The Light, The Cuban Brothers, MNEK, Wilkinson, Chas & Dave, Sophie Ellis-Bextor and Nick Mulvey.

== 2015 ==
Camp Bestival 2015 ran from 30 July to 2 August. The headliners were Clean Bandit, Kaiser Chiefs and Underworld. The theme was Go Wild!

== 2016 ==
Camp Bestival 2016 ran from 28 to 31 July. The headliners were Fatboy Slim, Tears for Fears and Jess Glynne. The theme was Space.

== 2017 ==
Camp Bestival 2017 ran from 27 to 30 July. The headliners were Mark Ronson, Madness and Brian Wilson.

== 2018 ==
Camp Bestival 2018 ran from 26 to 29 July. The headliners were Rick Astley, Clean Bandit and Simple Minds. The theme was "Camp Bestival Sets Sail!".

== 2019 ==
Camp Bestival 2019 ran from 25 to 26 July.

== 2020 ==
In common with most UK festivals, the 2020 event was cancelled, due to the COVID-19 pandemic in the United Kingdom.

== 2021 ==
Camp Bestival 2021 ran from 29 July to 1 August 2021. The theme was superheroes.

== 2022 ==
The festival continued at Lulworth Castle between 28 and 31 July. The theme was Desert Island Disco. Festival goers attempted the world's largest disco dance under a disco ball. There was an additional offering started in Weston Park called Camp Bestival Shropshire, despite it being a kilometre away from Shropshire. The Shropshire event was between 18 and 21 August.

== 2023 ==
The festival continued at Lulworth Castle between 27 and 30 July. The theme was Animal snap. The additional offering in Shropshire took place between 18 and 21 August.

== 2024 ==
Camp Bestival Dorset took place at Lulworth Castle from 25 to 28 July and featured performances from Orbital, Jake Shears, The Darkness and Sophie Ellis-Bextor.

Camp Bestival Shropshire took place at Weston Park in Shropshire from 15 to 18 August 2024 and included headline performances from Faithless, Paloma Faith, McFly and Rick Astley.

== 2025 ==
Camp Bestival Dorset featured headliners Sugababes, Basement Jaxx, Sir Tom Jones as well as Annie Mac, Dick & Dom, the Lightning Seeds, the Zutons, Mr. Maker and Mr. Tumble.

== The event ==
Camp Bestival features a variety of activities and entertainment throughout the festival. Apart from a 4-days long multiple arena line-up, the festival offers comedy shows, literature programmes, kids' areas, multiple workshops and performances.

Food and drink vendors are available all over the festival site.
