= Bestival =

Music festival in southern England (2004–2018)

Coordinates: 50°38′15″N 2°12′38″W

- Genre: Independent, dance
- Dates: Late summer, September (4 days)
- Locations: Dorset, England
- Years active: 2004–2018
- Attendance: 50,000
- Website: bestival.net

Bestival was a four-day music festival held in the south of England. The name Bestival is a portmanteau of the words best and festival. It had been held annually in the late summer since 2004 at Robin Hill on the Isle of Wight. In 2017 the festival relocated to the Lulworth Estate in Dorset. The event was organised by DJ and record producer Rob da Bank along with his wife Josie and was an offshoot of his Sunday Best record label and club nights. The initial Bestival attracted 10,000 people, growing to 50,000 in its final year, 2018. Bestival won 'Best Major Festival' at the 2015 UK Festival Awards, having won 'Best Medium-Sized Festival' in 2005, 2006, 2007 and 2009, 'Best Major Festival' in 2010, 2012 and in 2015, 'Fan's Favourite' in 2011 and 'Best Innovation' in 2005.

== Origins ==
The festival had been held annually in the late summer since 2004, in a small country park called 'Robin Hill' on the Isle of Wight. The event was organized by Rob da Bank and was an offshoot of his Sunday Best record label and club nights. Creative Director and wife Josie da Bank and co founders / partners John Hughes, Ziggy Gilsenan and Ben Turner were also involved in organising the event. The Isle of Wight holds more carnivals per capita than anywhere else in the United Kingdom.

In 2004, the festival was attended by 10,000 people, a figure which subsequently increased to 43,000 in 2009 and 50,000 in 2018.

A family-friendly sister festival "Camp Bestival" launched in 2008.

In December 2016, the organisers announced a move to The Lulworth Estate in Dorset.

In 2018 Bestival moved from its usual September date to the first week in August, a week after its sister festival, Camp Bestival, took place on the same, Lulworth Estate site.

In 2018 The Bestival organisation went into administration, leaving many workers unpaid. Bestival as a result ceased, however Camp Bestival continued on the same Lulworth Estate site and equivalent weekend in 2019. The event was again curated by Rob da Bank and his wife Josie. All remaining Bestival brands were bought out of administration in late 2018 by the US/Irish entertainments group Live Nation/Gaiety along with SJM concerts. As such they are now brand owners for Camp Bestival and, the currently inactive, Bestival.

== Festival ethos ==
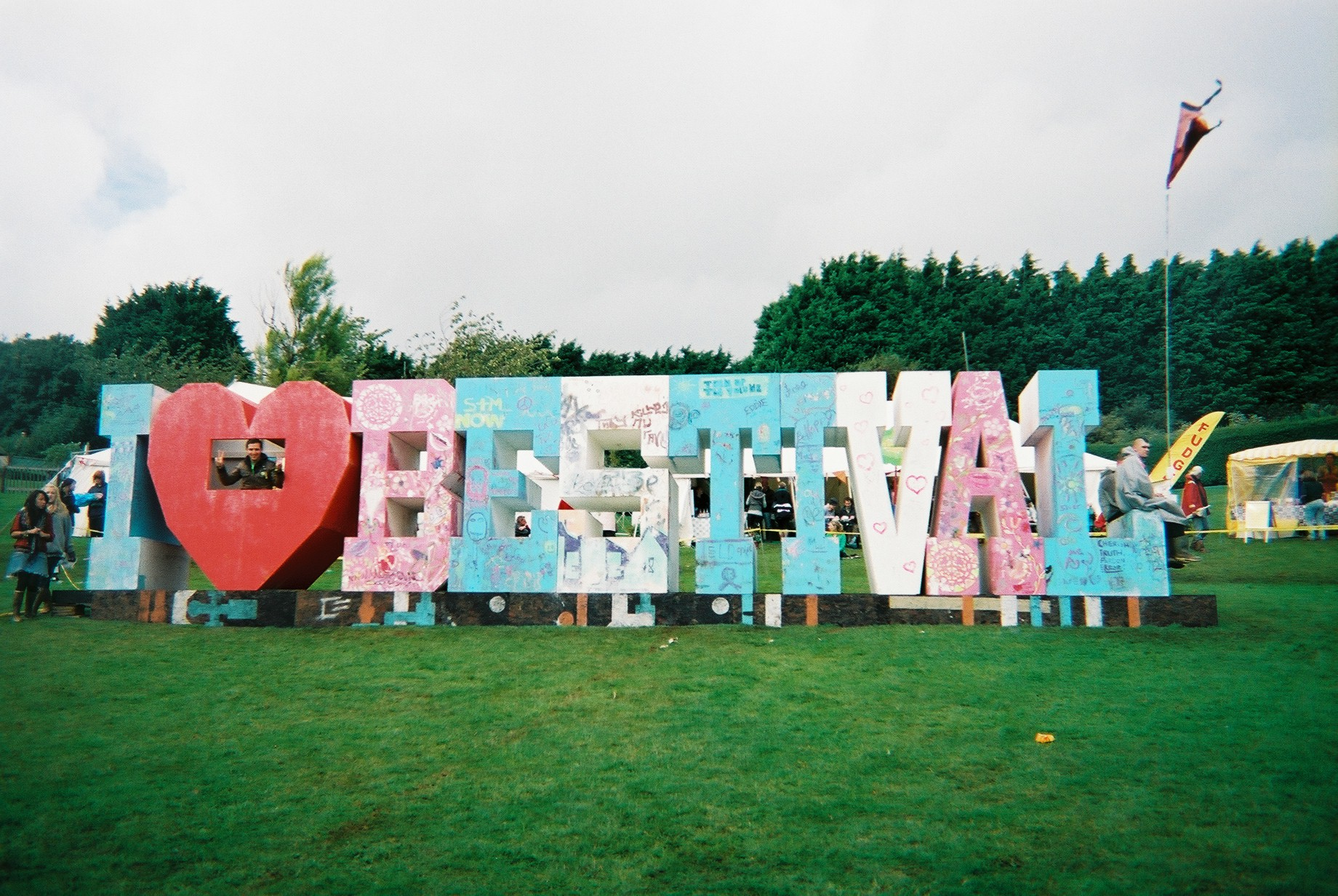
Bestival 2008 at Robin Hill Country Park

Bestival was well known for its fancy dress themed days (usually the Saturday of the festival). In 2005, an attempt was made to set the Guinness World Record for most people in fancy dress at any one event. By 2010 this was achieved, when 55,000 festival goers set a new Guinness World Record.

The festival was also heavily involved in supporting social and environmental causes. Rob da Bank and Bestival supported several Isle of Wight-based charities and youth organisations; for example Rob da Bank's Music Club, Isle of Wight Toy Appeal, Isle of Wight Youth Trust, St Catherines School and Barter For Bestival. On site at the festival, Bestival supported Oxfam, RSPB, Amnesty International, Water Aid and the Legacy Project. Bestival actively reduced its carbon emissions and impact on the environment; for example schemes such as Bike to Bestival, Swim to Bestival, LiftShare, exchanging recycling at the campsites for cups of tea, recycling and waste management, commissioning Environmental Impact Assessments, monitoring power usage and limiting water usage with push button taps.

Bestival was a founding member of the Greener Festival Alliance.

Bestival was often described as a "boutique festival" due to its non-corporate feel. It was also known for piloting odd and innovative ideas, including an inflatable church where people can get married. Other features included the "Breastival", a quiet Yurt designated for mothers and their breast-feeding children. The local Women's Institute had also been involved by providing refreshments for a minimal price.

== Performance venues ==
The main venues in 2014 were:

- Main Stage – an open-air main stage
- Big Top – the second venue, a large capacity tent
- Invaders of the Future
- The Bandstand (hosted by compere Scott Anderson)
- The Port – an outdoor DJ stage made from a boat (2013–2015)
- The Spaceport – Updated version of The Port (As of 2016)
- Bollywood
- Temple Island
- Reggae Roots
- Red Bull Music Academy Stage
- BBC Introducing

== Awards ==
Bestival has received the following awards:

- UK Festival Awards 2005: Best Medium-Sized Festival
- UK Festival Awards 2005: Best innovation
- UK Festival Awards 2006: Best Medium-Sized Festival
- UK Festival Awards 2007: Best Medium-Sized Festival
- UK Festival Awards 2009: Best Medium-Sized Festival
- UK Festival Awards 2010: Best Major Festival
- UK Festival Awards 2011: Fans Favourite
- UK Festival Awards 2012: Best Major Festival
- UK Festival Awards 2015: Best Major Festival
- DJ Mag's Best of British Awards 2012: Best Festival
- Artrocker Awards 2012: Festival of the Year
- AIF Festival Congress Awards 2014: Smart Marketing Campaign of the Year – Bestival Disco Ball
- Live Music Business Awards 2014: Best Festival (cap 40,000+)

== Bestival 2004 ==
2004 – The Bees, Basement Jaxx, Zero 7, Fatboy Slim, Mylo, Lee 'Scratch' Perry, Mista Mushroom and 'Subgiant'.

== Bestival 2005 ==
Attendance – 15,000

2005 – Röyksopp, The Magic Numbers, Super Furry Animals, 2manydjs, The Go! Team, Soulwax and Saint Etienne.

- Voted the Best (Medium-sized) Festival and the Most Innovative Festival at the 2005 UK Festival Awards.

== Bestival 2006 ==
Attendance – 17,000

2006 – Gogol Bordello, Pet Shop Boys, Scissor Sisters, Amadou & Mariam, Man-Machine, Brakes, Devendra Banhart, Get Cape. Wear Cape. Fly, Good Shoes, Hot Chip, iLiKETRAiNS, Jim Noir, John Martyn, Kid Creole & The Coconuts, Klaxons, Lily Allen, Mystery Jets, Scritti Politti, The Cuban Brothers, The Fall, The Long Blondes, The Pipettes, The Stranglers and The Sunshine Underground.

- Voted the Best (Medium-sized) Festival at the 2006 UK Festival Awards.

== Bestival 2007 ==
Attendance – 29,000

7 – 9 September

2007 – Beastie Boys, The Chemical Brothers, Primal Scream, Madness, Gregory Isaacs, The Levellers, The Orb, The Gossip, Kate Nash, Jack Peñate, Patrick Wolf, Billy Bragg, Easy Star All Stars, The Maccabees, Dub Pistols, Calvin Harris, Friendly Fires and The Shakes.

- Voted the Best (Medium-sized) Festival at the 2007 UK Festival Awards.

== Bestival 2008 ==
Attendance – 30,000

5 – 7 September

2008 – My Bloody Valentine, Amy Winehouse, Underworld, Aphex Twin, CSS, Hot Chip, Will Young, The Coral, Sam Sparro, Get Cape. Wear Cape. Fly, Alphabeat, Black Kids, Sugarhill Gang, The Breeders, George Clinton, Gary Numan, The Human League, Grace Jones, The Specials, Dan Le Sac Vs Scroobius Pip and 808 State.

- Shortlisted for the Best (Medium-sized) Festival at the 2008 UK Festival Awards.

== Bestival 2009 ==
Attendance – 43,000

11 – 13 September

2009 – Massive Attack, Kraftwerk, Elbow, MGMT, 65daysofstatic, Fleet Foxes, Little Boots, Mika, Klaxons, Soulwax, 2manydjs, Seasick Steve, Friendly Fires, Bat for Lashes, Florence and the Machine, Zane Lowe, Diplo, Annie Mac, Skream, DJ Yoda, Erol Alkan, The Bloody Beetroots, Lily Allen, Carl Cox, Michael Nyman, Squarepusher, Björn Again, Rob da Bank, Fujiya & Miyagi, La Roux, Krafty Kuts, Jack Penate, Alejandro Toledo and the Magic Tombolinos.

- Voted the Best (Medium-sized) Festival at the 2009 UK Festival Awards.

== Bestival 2010 ==
Attendance: 50,000

9–12 September

The Prodigy, The Flaming Lips, Dizzee Rascal, Rolf Harris, Gil Scott-Heron, Roxy Music, Marc Almond, Level 42, Echo & The Bunnymen, The XX, Howard Jones, Heaven 17, Chase & Status, Tinie Tempah, Rox, Simian Mobile Disco, Stornoway, Hot Chip, The Wailers, Lucky Elephant, Ellie Goulding, Barry Peters.

2010 also saw Bestival win 'best major festival' beating Glastonbury and Reading in a public vote; sister festival Camp Bestival picked up 'best family festival' as well.

== Bestival 2011 ==
Attendance: 45,000

8–11 September

Pendulum, The Cure, Björk, Primal Scream, Brian Wilson, P J Harvey, The Maccabees, Los Campesinos!, Fatboy Slim, Public Enemy, Big Audio Dynamite, Kelis, Chromeo, The Drums, Village People, Grandmaster Flash, Noah and the Whale, Groove Armada, Annie Mac, Magnetic Man, Robyn, Crystal Castles, DJ Shadow, Katy B, LFO, Cranes, A-Trak, Frank Turner.

Ben Howard and Benjamin Francis Leftwich both performed on The Bandstand which is hosted every year by Isle of Wight Comedian Scott Anderson.

2011 saw Bestival win "Fans' favourite festival award" in the UK Festival Awards.

== Bestival 2012 ==
- 6–9 September 2012

The main stage headliners were Florence and the Machine on Friday, New Order on Saturday, and Stevie Wonder who closed the main stage on Sunday, playing as a UK festival exclusive. Sigur Rós and The XX both performed UK festival exclusives on the main stage. The following also performed (this is not a complete list):

- Main Stage: Two Door Cinema Club, Emeli Sandé, Rizzle Kicks, Warpaint, Sister Sledge, De La Soul, Adam Ant, Flux Pavilion, First Aid Kit, Gallows
- Big Top: Friendly Fires, Hot Chip, Orbital, Gary Numan, Justice, Soulwax, Nero, Spiritualized, Death in Vegas, Major Lazer, SBTRKT
- Elsewhere: MF Doom, Bat For Lashes, Sage Francis, Grimes, Clock Opera, Pauline Henry

Azealia Banks and Frank Ocean were among a few artists who cancelled their performances. Wiley was announced as a special guest.

Bestival 2012 was awarded "Best Major Festival" at the UK Festival Awards, "Best Festival" at DJ Mag's Best of British Awards, and "Festival of the Year" at the Artrocker Awards.

Three people were killed while returning from Bestival when the old and worn tyres of their coach caused it to crash. A fundraising night was set up to remember the victims, taking place at Nation in Liverpool on 30 March 2013. Michael Molloy, an 18-year-old musician from Liverpool, was among those killed; his mother subsequently established Tyred, a charity which campaigns to outlaw old and unsafe tyres. The charity received more attention after it was publicly supported by actress Jodie Comer, who hails from the same area of Liverpool. In September 2013, a park bench in Woolton Woods (behind Comer's old school, St. Julie's) was turned into a memorial to Molloy.

== Bestival 2013 ==
- 5–8 September 2013

Headline acts were the Bestival Birthday Bash with Fatboy Slim on Friday, Snoop Dogg on Saturday and Elton John on Sunday, who was playing as a UK festival exclusive. The following also played (this is not a complete list): MIA, Franz Ferdinand, Flaming Lips, The Knife, Wu-Tang Clan, Bombay Bicycle Club, DJ Fresh, Bastille, The Roots, Belle and Sebastian, Disclosure, Jessie Ware, Richie Hawtin, Carl Cox, Annie Mac, Seth Troxler, Knife Party, While She Sleeps and more.

For 2013, Bestival introduced a weekly payment plan for tickets, the first music festival to offer this.

== Bestival 2014 ==
- 4–7 September 2014

Bestival 2014's theme was Desert Island Disco. The headline acts were Outkast, Foals, Beck and Chic Featuring Nile Rodgers; Nile Rodgers also challenged Bestival to create the world's largest disco ball for Bestival 2014, in which they succeeded with a disco ball of 10.33m. The previous record was 9.98 metres.

The following acts also appeared at Bestival 2014 (Not a complete list): Disclosure, Major Lazer, SpandyAndy, Paloma Faith, Basement Jaxx, London Grammar, Sam Smith, Candi Staton, Wild Beasts, Clean Bandit, La Roux, Bonobo and Skindred

Bestival 2014 was awarded 'Best Festival' at the Live Music Business Awards and 'Smart Marketing Campaign of the Year' at the AIF Festival Congress Awards for the record breaking Disco Ball.

== Bestival 2015 ==
- 10–13 September 2015

The 2015 theme was 'Summer of Love' and the headline acts were Duran Duran on Friday, The Chemical Brothers on Saturday and Missy Elliott on the Sunday night. Other acts included Underworld, Tame Impala, The Jacksons, Jungle, Jurassic 5, Rudimental, Flying Lotus, Skrillex, Mark Ronson, Róisín Murphy, Charli XCX, Ella Eyre and the Chuckle Brothers.

== Bestival 2016 ==
- 8–11 September 2016

The 2016 theme was 'The Future' and the headline acts were Hot Chip on Thursday, Major Lazer on Friday, The Cure on Saturday and Wiz Khalifa on Sunday. Other acts included: Leftfield, Bastille, Years and Years, Sean Paul, Fatboy Slim, Skepta, Damian Marley, Katy B, Wolf Alice and Carly Wilford of SISTER Collective.

This edition of the festival featured Bestival curator and organiser Rob da Bank DJing a history of drum & bass with Aled Jones on the microphone.

== Bestival 2017 ==
- 7–10 September 2017

The 2017 theme was 'Colour' and the headline acts were Jamie T on Thursday, The xx on Friday, A Tribe Called Quest on Saturday and Pet Shop Boys on Sunday. It was A Tribe Called Quest's last performance before disbanding. Other acts included: Dizzee Rascal, Wiley, Rag'n'Bone Man, Laura Mvula, Soul II Soul, Circa Waves, Blossoms, Lucy Rose and Annie Mac.

Louella Fletcher-Michie - the daughter of actor John Michie - died after taking the recreational drug 2C-P at the festival. Her boyfriend, Ceon Broughton, was convicted of her manslaughter by gross negligence on 28 February 2019, having videoed her over a period of six hours hallucinating and then begging for help, rather than taking her to the festival hospital tent only 400 metres away. He was also convicted to supplying a Class A drug, and sentenced to eight and a half years in prison. In August 2020 the manslaughter conviction was quashed on appeal, but the conviction for supplying a Class A drug stands.

== Bestival Toronto 2015 ==
- 12–13 June 2015

It was announced in February 2015 that for the first time, Bestival would be heading to North America. It was held at Toronto Islands and co-organized by SFX Entertainment and Toronto promoter Embrace. The headliners were Florence + The Machine and Nas performing "Illmatic". Other performers included Flume, Caribou, SBTRKT, Flosstradamus and Jamie xx.

== Bestival Toronto 2016 ==
- 11–12 June 2016

On 29 February 2016 the dates for the second Bestival Toronto were confirmed to be 11 and 12 June and the new location announced was Woodbine Park. The headliners were announced on 11 March 2016 to be The Cure and Tame Impala. Other performers included Odesza, Grimes, Jamie xx, Porter Robinson, Madeon, Tchami and Daughter.

On 4 May 2017 the organizers announced that there will be no Bestival Toronto in 2017, and they are "aiming to return in the future".

== Bestival Bali 2017 ==
- 30 September–1 October 2017

It was announced that the inaugural edition of Bestival Bali would be held on 30 September and 1 October 2017 at Garuda Wisnu Kencana Cultural Park. The headliners were Alt-J and Rudimental. Other performers included Pendulum, Purity Ring, De La Soul, Bag Raiders, George Clinton & Parliament - Funkadelic, Stars & Rabbit and Rob da Bank.
