= Sunday Best (company) =

British record label

Sunday Best Recordings
- Founded: 2000
- Founder: Rob da Bank, Sarah Bolshi
- Distributor: The Orchard
- Country of origin: United Kingdom
- Location: London, England

Sunday Best Recordings is a British music label, founded by DJ Rob da Bank and Sarah Bolshi in 2000.

== History ==
Rob da Bank originally ran Sunday Best as a leftfield London club night from 1995, hosting DJs such as Fatboy Slim, Basement Jaxx and Andrew Weatherall. Celebrating an ‘anything goes’ music policy, the club night formed a blueprint for the Sunday Best label. Da Bank went on to co-create Bestival and Camp Bestival and presently broadcasts as a radio DJ on Gilles Peterson’s Worldwide FM after departing from BBC Radio One.

Sarah Bolshi cut her teeth working in A&R at Big Life Records, mentored by Jazz Summers, working on acts like The Orb and De Le Soul before establishing her first breakbeat label Bolshi Records in 1996. She was in the process of re-releasing the Bolshi catalogue digitally via the Sunday Best umbrella.

The team co-founded Sunday Best Music Publishing working alongside Domino Publishing (sister company to Domino Records) signing much of the recording roster. In 2014, they also established an electronic imprint - Silver Bear Recordings - managed by London duo Wayward, who released their debut album through the label in March 2021.

== Artists ==
Artists released via the label include:

- Bastila
- Beardyman
- Boomclick
- The Cure
- Christopher D Ashley
- The Cuban Brothers
- dan le sac vs Scroobius Pip
- Rhoda Dakar
- David Lynch
- Dub Pistols
- Ebony Bones
- Mary Epworth
- The Ghost
- Grand National
- Alice Jemima
- JW Francis
- Kitty, Daisy & Lewis
- Klangkuenstler
- L.A. Salami
- Laucan
- Lemonade
- Lucky Elephant
- Max Sedgley
- Michael Molloy and Alex Evans
- Misty's Big Adventure
- New Order
- Norman Jay MBE
- Number
- O'Flynn
- Plastic Mermaids
- Plastic Operator
- Ben Ottewell
- Solar Bears
- Sound of Rum
- This Is the Kit
- Skinny Lister
- Valerie June
- Wayward
- Xylaroo

It also includes and Rob da Bank's own production outfit, Lazyboy.

== See also ==
- List of record labels: R–Z
