= Rob da Bank =

English DJ (born 1973)

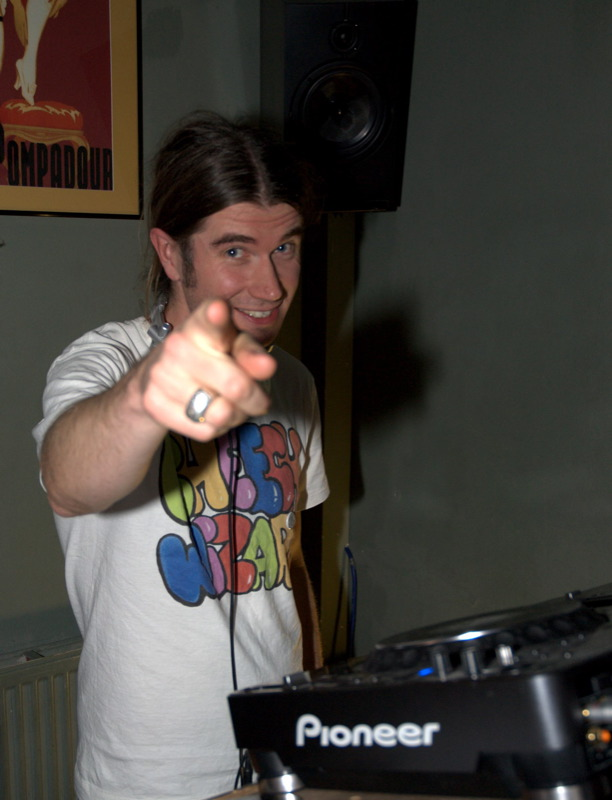
- Rob da Bank in 2006

Background information
- Also known as: Rob da Bank
- Born: Robert John Gorham; 24 June 1973 (age 53); Portsmouth, Hampshire, England
- Occupation: DJ
- Label: Sunday Best Recordings
- Website: sundaybest.net earwormmusic.net
- Rob da Bank's voice recorded 2012, as part of an audio description of Gordon's Wine Bar for VocalEyes

Robert John Gorham (born 24 June 1973 in Portsmouth, Hampshire), known by the pseudonym Rob da Bank, is an English DJ and co-founder of music festivals Bestival, originally on the Isle of Wight and now moved to Lulworth, Dorset and Camp Bestival, also in Lulworth. He presented a show on BBC Radio 1 which focused on promoting new left-field music. Examples of artists featured on his show include Tipper, Moloko and a host of unsigned acts.

Until September 2006, he and Chris Coco were the presenters of the Blue Room on Radio 1. He hosted the Radio One Music Show on Thursday nights, the content of which was more similar to the music played on his current show. Rob da Bank filled in for John Peel's show for several weeks following his death in 2004.

In 2007, he produced the Together in Electric Dreams EP.

In 2009, he gave BBC Blast an exclusive look behind the scenes of his show. Until 2014, he hosted a Friday-night/Saturday-morning BBC Radio 1 show focused on left-field electronica.

He is also the owner of a number of business ventures under the name Sunday Best, which originated as a Sunday night event in a Battersea tea-room.

The music played by Rob da Bank on Sunday Best helped launch the "bar culture" (as opposed to "club culture"), which features more relaxed activities than dancing.

Sunday Best has grown to incorporate a record label and two offshoot music festivals, Bestival on the Isle of Wight and in 2008, Camp Bestival, which is more family orientated and held in the grounds of Lulworth Castle in Dorset. In 2018 Bestival went into administration, leaving many workers unpaid. However, a festival of the same name, curated by Gorham and his wife Josie, was announced for 2019, at the same site and on the equivalent weekend.

Gorham and music producer Dan Carey (known as Mr Dan) have released several records under the alias Lazyboy on Gorham's Sunday Best Recordings label.

Gorham has also compiled a mix LP for the Fabric night club's series of mix compilations, entitled Fabric 24 (2006).

In June 2014, it was announced that in September 2014, da Bank would leave BBC Radio 1 and that he would join the 6 Music family. His last show was on Saturday 30 August 2014. Da Bank hosts a weekly radio show on the American radio network Evolution.

In 2014, alongside Graphite Media he set up the company 'Earworm', a Music Supervision, Original Composition and Talent Procurement service for Film, TV, Video Games and Advertising. Recent work includes the music supervision for BBC One's From There to Here, original compositions for HBO's The Leftovers (TV series), the title music for Annie Mac's 'Superstar DJs' on Channel 4 and music supervision for Forza Horizon 2.

Da Bank was awarded The Outstanding Contribution Award at the 2014 AIF Festival Congress Awards.

== Personal life ==
Rob da Bank grew up in the village of Warsash in Hampshire.

Rob da Bank divides his time between London and the Isle of Wight with his illustrator wife Josie and their four sons.
