= I'm Not Gonna Teach Your Boyfriend How to Dance with You =

2008 single by Black Kids

Single by Black Kids

from the album Partie Traumatic
- B-side: "Damn I Wish I Was Your Lover"; "You Turn Me On"
- Released: April 7, 2008
- Length: 3:40
- Label: Almost Gold
- Songwriter: Black Kids
- Producer: Bernard Butler

Black Kids singles chronology
"I'm Not Gonna Teach Your Boyfriend How to Dance with You" (2008)	"Hurricane Jane" (2008)

Music video
- "I'm Not Gonna Teach Your Boyfriend How to Dance with You" on YouTube

"I'm Not Gonna Teach Your Boyfriend How to Dance with You" is a song by American indie rock band Black Kids from their debut album, Partie Traumatic (2008). It was released as the band's debut single by Almost Gold Recordings on April 7, 2008, in the United Kingdom, and on May 27, 2008, in North America. The song peaked at number 11 on the UK Singles Chart but did not chart in the United States. The demo version from the band's 2007 EP Wizard of Ahhhs placed at number 68 on Pitchfork Media's "Top 100 Tracks of 2007".

The song was covered by Darren Criss in the television series Glee, in season 2, episode 20. The cover was subsequently released for purchase and on streaming platforms.

== Background ==
According to lead singer Reggie Youngblood, the track was inspired by Jacksonville's dance party scene: he realized that usually, the girls he danced with would be with guys who couldn't dance. The line "You are the girl, that I've been dreaming of, ever since I was a little girl" is based on an inside joke between Reggie and his sister Ali Youngblood where they would refer to wanting something as "Ever since I was a little girl".

== Reception ==
In a review of Partie Traumatic on AllMusic, Tim Sendra called "I'm Not Gonna Teach Your Boyfriend How to Dance with You" one of the best songs on the album, writing that it "kick[s] you in the gut with [its] energy and verve." Commercially, the single performed well in the United Kingdom, debuting at number 84 on April 6, 2008, and rising to its peak of number 11 the following week. It became a minor hit in the Flanders region of Belgium, reaching number 10 on the Ultratip listing.

== Track listings ==
All songs were written by Black Kids except where noted.

7-inch single (pink vinyl)

A. "I'm Not Gonna Teach Your Boyfriend How to Dance with You" – 3:39
B. "Damn I Wish I Was Your Lover" (Sophie B. Hawkins) – 2:26

UK 12-inch single (white vinyl)

A1. "I'm Not Gonna Teach Your Boyfriend How to Dance with You" – 3:39
B1. "I'm Not Gonna Teach Your Boyfriend How to Dance with You" (The Twelves Remix) – 3:46
B2. "I'm Not Gonna Teach Your Boyfriend How to Dance with You" (The Twelves Remix – Dub Version) – 3:46

CD single and EP

1. "I'm Not Gonna Teach Your Boyfriend How to Dance with You" – 3:39
2. "You Turn Me On" (Beat Happening) – 2:50
3. "Damn I Wish I Was Your Lover" (Hawkins) – 2:26

US and Canadian digital download

1. "I'm Not Gonna Teach Your Boyfriend How to Dance with You" – 3:40
2. "I'm Not Gonna Teach Your Boyfriend How to Dance with You" (The Twelves Remix) – 3:44

UK digital download EP

1. "I'm Not Gonna Teach Your Boyfriend How to Dance with You" – 3:39
2. "You Turn Me On" (Beat Happening) – 2:50
3. "Damn I Wish I Was Your Lover" (Hawkins) – 2:26
4. "I'm Not Gonna Teach Your Boyfriend How to Dance with You" (The Twelves Remix) – 3:46

== Personnel ==
- Owen Holmes – bass guitar
- Kevin Snow – drums
- Dawn Watley – keyboards and vocals
- Ali Youngblood – keyboards and vocals
- Reggie Youngblood – guitar and vocals

== Charts ==
=== Weekly charts ===
Chart (2008)	Peak position
Belgium (Ultratip Bubbling Under Flanders)	10
Scotland Singles (OCC)	11
UK Singles (OCC)	11

=== Year-end charts ===
Chart (2008)	Position
UK Singles (OCC)	153

== Certifications ==
Region	Certification	Certified units/sales
United Kingdom (BPI)	Silver	200,000^{‡}
^{‡} Sales+streaming figures based on certification alone.

== Release history ==
Region	Date	Format(s)	Label(s)	Ref(s).
United Kingdom	April 7, 2008	7-inch vinyl; 12-inch vinyl; CD	Almost Gold	
Canada	May 27, 2008	Digital download	Almost Gold	
United States	May 27, 2008	Digital download	Almost Gold	
