= Voyager (Walter Meego album) =

Studio album by Walter Meego
- Released: May 27, 2008 (U.S.)
- Genre: Dance-pop
- Length: 43:10
- Label: Almost Gold, Startime

Professional ratings
Review scores
Source	Rating
AllMusic	4/5 stars
Okayplayer	(80/100)
Pitchfork	(6.5/10)

Voyager is the first studio album by American band Walter Meego. It consists of 11 tracks, including re-recorded album versions of the previously released tracks "Wanna Be a Star" and "Keyhole". It was released May 27, 2008. Two of its tracks, "In My Dreams" and "Forever", were featured in episodes of the second season of the television show Ugly Betty.

== Track listing ==
1. "Forever" – 4:20
2. "Wanna Be a Star" – 3:48
3. "Girls" – 3:24
4. "More Than I Can Say" – 3:21
5. "Tomorrowland" – 3:55
6. "Keyhole" – 4:48
7. "Lost" – 4:09
8. "Letting Go" – 3:47
9. "Baby Please" – 3:05
10. "Your Love" – 4:08
11. "In My Dreams" – 4:25
