= Wizard of Ahhhs =

EP by Black Kids
- Released: August 2007
- Recorded: Spring 2007
- Studio: The Glow, Jacksonville, Florida
- Genre: Indie pop; new wave; post-punk revival
- Length: 15:09
- Label: Self-released
- Producer: Jesse Mangum

Black Kids chronology
| Wizard of Ahhhs (2007) | Partie Traumatic (2008) |

Wizard of Ahhhs is the debut EP by American indie pop band Black Kids, self-released in August 2007 as a free download via the band's Myspace page. The four-song collection played a pivotal role in launching the band’s career amid the rise of the late-2000s "blog rock" era.

== Background and release ==
Black Kids recorded Wizard of Ahhhs in spring 2007 at The Glow recording studio in Jacksonville, Florida, with local musician and producer Jesse Mangum. The EP was initially distributed as a free digital download through Myspace and later through the band’s official website until early 2008.

In 2008, Columbia Records and Almost Gold Recordings reissued the EP on 33 ⅓ RPM 10" vinyl and as a promotional CD.

The band recorded eight tracks during the sessions, seven of which were later re-recorded for their debut album, Partie Traumatic; the remaining song, "Designs on AKA You," was not officially released until 2022.

In 2022, Science Project Records issued a limited-edition vinyl compilation titled EXTENDED AHHHHHHHS, featuring all eight tracks recorded in 2007 at The Glow.

== Track listing ==
=== Original 2007 EP ===
All lyrics are written by Black Kids; all music is composed by Black Kids.

| No. | Title | Length |
|---|---|---|
| 1. | "Hit the Heartbrakes" | 3:37 |
| 2. | "I'm Not Gonna Teach Your Boyfriend How to Dance with You" | 3:32 |
| 3. | "Hurricane Jane" | 4:27 |
| 4. | "I've Underestimated My Charm (Again)" | 3:33 |
| Total length: | | 15:06 |

=== 2022 expanded edition ===
All lyrics are written by Black Kids; all music is composed by Black Kids.

| No. | Title | Length |
|---|---|---|
| 1. | "Hit the Heartbrakes" |
| 2. | "I'm Not Gonna Teach Your Boyfriend How to Dance with You" |
| 3. | "Listen to Your Body Tonight" |
| 4. | "Designs on AKA You" |
| 5. | "I Wanna Be Your Limousine" |
| 6. | "Hurricane Jane" |
| 7. | "Love Me Already" |
| 8. | "I've Underestimated My Charm (Again)" |

== Personnel ==
- Reggie Youngblood – vocals, guitar
- Ali Youngblood – keyboards, vocals
- Dawn Watley – keyboards, vocals
- Owen Holmes – bass guitar
- Kevin Snow – drums

== Musical style and themes ==
The EP blends elements of indie pop, post-punk revival, and new wave with danceable rhythms and bright, dual-vocal harmonies. Critics highlighted the contrast between upbeat production and emotionally vulnerable lyrics about desire, jealousy, and self-doubt. Pitchfork described its "tightly executed, irresistibly catchy songs" that "put a memorable stamp on pop’s classic themes," noting Reggie Youngblood’s playful and androgynous lyrical delivery, particularly on "I'm Not Gonna Teach Your Boyfriend How to Dance with You."

== Critical reception ==
Professional ratings
Review scores
| Source | Rating |
|---|---|
| Pitchfork | 8.4/10 |

Wizard of Ahhhs received widespread acclaim upon release, quickly spreading through music blogs and online communities. Pitchfork awarded the EP an 8.4/10 and named it Best New Music, later placing "I'm Not Gonna Teach Your Boyfriend How to Dance with You" among its Top 100 Songs of 2007. Rolling Stone gave "Hit the Heartbrakes" 3.5 out of 4 stars. The New York Post listed "I'm Not Gonna Teach Your Boyfriend How to Dance with You" as the #2 best song to download of 2007.

The EP’s tracks received airplay on BBC Radio 1, including support from Zane Lowe, Rob Da Bank, and Colin Murray. Treble described the release as "wonderfully crafted, with hooks enough for each song to become a single".

The buzz from Wizard of Ahhhs led to major-label attention, extensive touring, and the band’s signing with Quest Management, which also represented Arcade Fire and Björk.

In December 2007, Kate Nash performed a cover version of "I'm Not Gonna Teach Your Boyfriend How to Dance with You" on French radio station Ouï FM.

== Legacy ==
Wizard of Ahhhs is often cited as one of the defining releases of the mid-2000s indie blog era, demonstrating how internet word-of-mouth and Myspace distribution could catapult a previously unknown band to international visibility. The EP’s rapid success helped position Black Kids among a wave of acts—including Clap Your Hands Say Yeah and Arctic Monkeys—who achieved global attention through online virality rather than traditional promotion.

== Release history ==
| Region | Date | Format | Label |
|---|---|---|---|
| Worldwide | August 2007 | Digital download | Self-released |
| United States | 2008 | 10" vinyl, promo CD | Almost Gold, Columbia |
| United States | 2022 | 12" vinyl (limited edition) | Science Project Records |
