= You Have No Idea What You're Getting Yourself Into =

Studio album by Does It Offend You, Yeah?
- Released: 24 March 2008
- Recorded: 2006–2007
- Length: 38:30
- Labels: Virgin, Startime, Almost Gold
- Producers: Elliot James; Does It Offend You, Yeah?

Does It Offend You, Yeah? chronology
You Have No Idea What You're Getting Yourself Into (2008)	Don't Say We Didn't Warn You (2011)

Singles from You Have No Idea What You're Getting Yourself Into
- 1. "Weird Science" Released: 7 May 2007; 2. "Let's Make Out" Released: 8 October 2007; 3. "We Are Rockstars" Released: 11 February 2008; 4. "Epic Last Song" Released: 2 June 2008; 5. "Dawn of the Dead" Released: 24 August 2008

Professional ratings
Aggregate scores
Source	Rating
Metacritic	59/100
Review scores
Source	Rating
AllMusic	4/5 stars
AbsolutePunk.net	83%
DJ	4/5 stars
Drowned in Sound	4/10 stars
The Guardian	3/5 stars
NME	7/10
Q	4/5 stars
The Second Supper	not rated
Spin	3/5 stars

You Have No Idea What You're Getting Yourself Into is the debut album from Does It Offend You, Yeah?. It was released on 24 March 2008.

== Track listing ==
All tracks were written and recorded by Does It Offend You, Yeah? except tracks two and seven which were co-written with Eliot James and Sebastien Grainger respectively.

No.	Title	Writer(s)	Length
1.	"Battle Royale"	Does It Offend You, Yeah?	3:35
2.	"With a Heavy Heart (I Regret to Inform You)"	Does It Offend You, Yeah? & Eliot James	4:03
3.	"We Are Rockstars"	Does It Offend You, Yeah?	3:48
4.	"Dawn of the Dead"	Does It Offend You, Yeah?	3:26
5.	"Doomed Now"	Does It Offend You, Yeah?	3:41
6.	"Attack of the 60 ft Lesbian Octopus"	Does It Offend You, Yeah?	1:57
7.	"Let's Make Out" (featuring Sebastien Grainger of Death From Above 1979)	Does It Offend You, Yeah? & Sebastien Grainger	4:02
8.	"Being Bad Feels Pretty Good"	Does It Offend You, Yeah?	4:05
9.	"Weird Science"	Does It Offend You, Yeah?	5:02
10.	"Epic Last Song"		4:35

iTunes bonus track
No.	Title	Length
11.	"Like the Way I Do"	3:51

Play.com bonus track
No.	Title	Length
11.	"Tales of the Chameleon"	3:39

== Personnel ==
- James Rushent – lead vocals, bass, guitar, synth, vocoder
- Rob Bloomfield – drums, bass, guitar, synth, backing vocals
- Dan Coop – synth
- Sebastien Grainger – vocals on "Let's Make Out"
- Elliot James – guitar
- Morgan Quaintance – guitar on "Doomed Now"

== Production ==
- Producers: Does It Offend You, Yeah?, Eliot James
- Mix: Rich Costey

== Charts ==
Chart (2008)	Peak position
UK Albums Chart	48
