= Meego =

Meego may refer to:

- MeeGo, a Linux-based open source mobile operating system
- Meego (TV series), a 1997 American science fiction sitcom
- Walter Meego, a band from Chicago, United States
- See also Mi-go
