= Starface =

2026 studio album by Tyga

Studio album by Starface
- Released: July 31, 2026
- Genres: Disco; synth-pop
- Length: 30:41
- Labels: Last King; Empire
- Producers: Count Bassy; Nic Nac

Tyga chronology
NSFW (2025)	Starface (2026)

Singles from Starface
- 1. "Gave U Racks" Released: July 3, 2026; 2. "Affection" Released: July 10, 2026; 3. "Freezing" Released: July 31, 2026; 4. "Just Us Tonight" Released: August 7, 2026; 5. "Last Forever" Released: August 20, 2026

Starface (stylized as $TARFACE) is the ninth studio album by American rapper Tyga, released under the alter ego Starface. It is a concept album inspired by the 1983 film Scarface and 1980s disco and synth-pop music, departing from Tyga's hip-hop work. It was released on July 31, 2026. To promote the album, Tyga released five singles and announced the "$tarface Tour".

Before the album's release, Tyga said the production team used equipment from the 1980s to recreate the musical atmosphere, and cited his mother as an inspiration. Artists that inspired the album include Prince, Michael Jackson and Rick James. Tyga later commented that Starface incorporates artificial intelligence, which attracted negative critical reviews. Starface sold fewer than 2,000 album-equivalent units in its first week in the United States.

== Background ==
Tyga created an alter ego named Starface (stylized as $TARFACE), who lives in a fictional world inspired by the 1983 film Scarface, including its "mythology and visual language". The world in which he lives draws parallels to Miami during the 1980s. Tyga played the film repeatedly in the studio while recording the album.

Tyga collaborated with Fenix Flexin on the unreleased song "Lavish", which features elements inspired by music from 1983, including synthesizers and high vocals. Flexin had previously released "Rubberz", a song created using artificial intelligence (AI) with the program Treblo.

After being questioned if Starface had been produced using AI in an interview with Vibe, Tyga admitted to using it for producing elements quickly, such as the synthesizer and guitar tracks. He explained: "I know people are going to be mad about me saying this, but it's where technology is going. It's no different than when Auto-Tune came out." Tyga stated that he performed the vocals and wrote the lyrics.

== Composition ==
Starface is a concept album that has influences from synth-wave, pop, R&B, and funk. Tyga said that the production team used recording equipment from the 1980s "to recreate the tone of the era", including the mixing. Tyga was inspired by his mother, who died in 2025, and said the 1980s were "her era". He also said he drew inspiration from musicians of that time, namely Prince, Michael Jackson, Hall & Oates, Rick James, The Police, and Tom Petty. The album's 1980s-inspired aesthetic and use of an alter ego drew comparisons to Tory Lanez's 2021 concept album Alone at Prom, with The Source writing, "The similarities are clear, from the alter ego and vocal transformation to the synth-heavy production and vintage visuals."

== Release and promotion ==
Starface was released on July 31, 2026. Five songs were released as singles to promote the album in the same year. The first was "Gave U Racks", released prior to the album's release on July 3. The second single, "Affection", was released on July 10. "Freezing" became the third single, released along with the album. "Just Us Tonight" and "Last Forever" were the fourth and fifth releases, on August 7 and August 20, respectively.

Tyga announced the "$tarface Tour" in August 2026. It consisted of two shows in Los Angeles and Brooklyn in September 2026.

== Critical reception ==
Professional ratings
Review scores
Source	Rating
Pitchfork	0.0/10
RapReviews	1/10
Sputnikmusic	0.5/5

Starface was panned for its use of AI. Pitchfork gave it a score of 0.0, being their first review with that score since 2007 with the compilation album This Is Next. Its critic Drew Millard compared Starface to Rebirth (2010) by Lil Wayne, as both rappers made experiments with genres different from theirs in an attempt to reinvent their music. However, Millard was critical of Tyga's use of AI platforms, leading Millard to imitate Tyga by using an AI platform and generating "a song that sounded exactly like" one of Starface's tracks. He also questioned whether Tyga sings on the album, and whether the musicians who inspired it can even be heard on the record. Millard concluded that the album "is smug and complacent, an amalgam of '80s synth-pop and disco slapped together by someone who's seemingly never cared to listen to one synth-pop or disco record in his life". Sputnikmusic's Shamus gave the album a 0.5/5, calling it "an insult to music as an art form" and a "steaming pile of slop" before stating "I have no problem taking my well-reasoned ire just a step further and explicitly referring to this as one of the worst albums of all time".

== Commercial performance ==
Starface sold less than 2,000 album-equivalent units in its first week in the United States. It failed to enter the nations's Billboard 200 chart.

== Track listing ==
All tracks are written by Micheal Ray Stevenson, Nicholas Matthew Balding, and James Hau; all tracks are produced by Nic Nac and Count Bassy.

Starface track listing
No.	Title	Length
1.	"Spinnin in Circles"	2:37
2.	"White Grains"	2:39
3.	"Powdered Dreams"	2:57
4.	"Just Us Tonight"	2:54
5.	"Freezing"	4:03
6.	"Gave U Racks"	3:19
7.	"Time Is Currency"	2:55
8.	"Affection"	2:48
9.	"Die 4U"	3:12
10.	"Last Forever"	3:17
Total length:		30:41
