= Cold Blank =

American musician

- Origin: Los Angeles, U.S.
- Genres: House, electro house, complextro, dubstep, drum and bass, alternative dance, nu-disco
- Years active: 2008–present
- Labels: Burn The Fire, Dim Mak Records, Ultra Music, Cr2 Records
- Members: Christopher Gaspar
- Past members: Manuel Luquin
- Website: www.coldblank.com

Cold Blank is an American, Los Angeles–based electronic house music DJ/production project, created by American DJ/producer Christopher Gaspar. Formerly a collaboration along with DJ/producer Manuel Luquin, they parted ways in late 2013.

With early beginnings stemming from the underground party scene in Los Angeles, the former duo launched their company Burn The Fire in 2007 to brand their events and pop-up parties that helped pave the way for the explosion of EDM before they began working together on production. In autumn of 2009, the Burn The Fire brand evolved into a record label and talent agency. The label's catalog features high-profile and international guest artists including Sean Tyas, Lazy Rich, Joachim Garraud, Fukkk Offf, Sharooz, Reid Speed, and many more.

Cold Blank saw early success with several singles and remixes on top labels such as Dim Mak Records and Ultra Music that climbed to the top of multiple digital music distributor charts including a remix of Cypress X Rusko feat. Damian Marley that climbed up to #1 on Beatport's Top 100 Hip Hop chart. Since 2008, Cold Blank has toured extensively worldwide including dates in South Korea, Brazil, Italy, Britain, France, Spain, Australia, New Zealand, Canada, and Mexico.

In late 2012, the former duo released The Agenda, Cold Blank's first studio album which was released on 6 August 2012 through Burn The Fire Records. Notable collaborators on the album include Andy Taylor (formerly of Duran Duran) and Blake Miller, with press coverage ranging from MTV Music's "MTV Hive", DJ Times, and Artistdirect. In addition, Cold Blank was nominated in the ‘Top 100 DJs In America’ poll by DJ Times magazine, America's first magazine dedicated to DJs and DJ culture.

== Discography ==
=== Albums ===
- 2012: The Agenda

=== Singles / EPs ===
Single / EP	Tracks	Label	Year	Album
Your Love Is Electric	Your Love Is Electric	Burn The Fire	2009	—
Fresh Attire Vol. 3	Crush Groovin'	Wearhouse Music	2009	—
Left To Right	Left To Right	Destination?	2009	—
Breakdown	Breakdown	Burn The Fire	2009	—
Doin' It Right	Doin' It Right	Burn The Fire	2009	—
Los Angeles	Los Angeles; Los Angeles feat. Whiskey Pete (Clean Mix); Los Angeles feat. Whiskey Pete (Dirty Mix)	Burn The Fire	2010	The Agenda
Dutchie	Dutchie	Burn The Fire	2010	—
Ghetto Ass Bitches	Ghetto Ass Bitches	Burn The Fire	2010	—
Hot & Cold	Overdose	Burn The Fire	2010	—
The Flying Cat	The Flying Cat	Burn The Fire	2010	—
Rave To The Grave	Raver Booty; Shuffle	Burn The Fire	2010	—
Those Who From Heaven To Earth Came	The Lizard King; Annunaki	Burn The Fire	2010	—
Still Smoking	Nasty & Gaspar Still Smoking	Burn The Fire	2010	—
The Thirteenth Skull	The Thirteenth Skull	Burn The Fire	2010	—
Die Famous	Die Famous	Burn The Fire	2011	—
Redroid	Redroid	Temple Music Group	2011	—
Ancient Psychic Tandem War Elephant	Ancient Psychic Tandem War Elephant	Burn The Fire	2011	—
2012 – Remix Contest EP	2012 (Remastered)	Burn The Fire	2012	The Agenda
Louder Than Bombs	Louder Than Bombs	Burn The Fire	2012	The Agenda
Deception	Deception	Burn The Fire	2012	The Agenda
Onslaught	Onslaught	Burn The Fire	2012	The Agenda
Drop Bears	Drop Bears	Burn The Fire	2013	—
Planet Boogie	Planet Boogie	—	2013	Promo
Hyped	Hyped	Vicious	2014	—
Slutty Modem	Slutty Modem	Rottun Records	2015	—
Pump It, Work It	Pump It, Work It	—	2016	Promo

=== Official remixes ===
Artist	Song	Mix Name	Label	Year
Lazrtag	Never Gonna Stop	Cold Blank Remix	Lazrtag Records / Arcade Records	2010
The Bulgarian feat. Spoek	Jack It Like A Zombie	Cold Blank Remix	Potty Mouth Music	2010
Phatfranco	The Return Of The Ruins	Cold Blank Remix	Big Alliance Records / Straight Up! Music	2010
Calvertron	Funky Jam	Cold Blank Remix	BugEyed Records	2010
Scotty Boy, DJ Red, & Josh Dupont	Zombies On The Dancefloor	Cold Blank Remix	Movement Music	2010
Electric Soulside	Feel Funky	Cold Blank Remix	Burn The Fire	2010
Aniki feat. Whiskey Pete	Put On My Raving Kicks	Cold Blank Remix	Burn The Fire	2010
Spencer & Hill	Back2Back	Cold Blank Remix	Bazooka Records	2010
Rank 1	L.E.D. There Be Light	Cold Blank Remix	High Contrast Recordings; Ministry of Sound	2010
Robbie Rivera feat. Ozmosis	Keep On Going	Cold Blank Remix; Cold Blank Dub Mix; Cold Blank Radio Mix	Black Hole Recordings / Ultra Records	2010
Viro & Rob Analyze	WannuB	Cold Blank Remix	Noiseporn Records	2011
Zedd	Autonomy	Cold Blank Remix	BugEyed Records	2011
PeaceTreaty feat. Kissed With A Noise	Cal State Anthem	Cold Blank Remix	Dim Mak Records	2011
Will Bailey feat. Persian Wolf	Expander	Cold Blank Remix	Simma Records	2011
Vaski	Storm Chaser	Cold Blank Remix	Burn The Fire	2011
Bastian Van Shield	Sonic Empire	Cold Blank Remix	Bazooka Records	2011
Jaswho? & Chela Simone	Solar Future	Cold Blank Remix	Temple Music Group	2011
DJ Chuckie	What Happens In Vegas	Cold Blank Remix	Cr2 Records	2012
Vandalism	Insane	Cold Blank Remix	Vicious	2012
Stafford Brothers	Pressure	Cold Blank Remix	Cr2 Records	2012
Cypress X Rusko	Can't Keep Me Down feat. Damian Marley	Cold Blank Remix	V2 / Cooperative Music	2012
Joachim Garraud & Alesia	Atrium	Cold Blank Remix	Dim Mak Records	2012
Steve Aoki & Angger Dimas vs. Dimitri Vegas & Like Mike	Phat Brahms	Cold Blank Remix	Dim Mak Records	2013
Ricky Blaze	Lightaz	Cold Blank Remix	Ultra Records	2013
Brass Knuckles	As Long As I'm Alive feat. John Ryan	Cold Blank Remix	Ultra Records	2013
Cyberpunkers	Mad Armada	Cold Blank Remix	Freakz Me Out Records	2013
The Cataracts & Trevor Simpson	Dagger	Cold Blank Remix	Carillo Music LLC	2013
Sound Of Stereo	Origin (One On One) feat. Teddiedrum	Cold Blank Remix	Dim Mak Records	2013
Mr Fluff	Fist Pump!	Cold Blank Remix	Vicious	2014

=== Bootlegs ===
Artist	Song	Mix Name	Year
Justice	We Are Your Friends	Cold Blank's Somos Tus Amigos Remix	2008
M.I.A.	Paper Planes	Cold Blank Remix	2008
Dusty Kid	The Cat	Cold Blank Remix	2008
Designer Drugs	Back Up In This	Cold Blank Remix	2009
Notorious B.I.G.	Hypnotize	Cold Blank Remix	2009
Surkin	Radio Fireworks	Cold Blank's 808 Remix	2009
Does It Offend You, Yeah?	We Are Rockstars	Cold Blank Remix	2009
Major Lazer	Pon De Floor	Cold Blank Remix	2009
DJ Chuckie	Let The Bass Kick	Cold Blank Remix	2009
Green Velvet	Shake And Pop	Cold Blank Remix	2009
MSTRKRFT	Street Justice	Cold Blank's Dancefloor Killa Remix	2010
Daft Punk	Robot Rock	Cold Blank Remix	2010
Chris Brown	Yeah 3x	Cold Blank & Alex Dreamz Remix	2011
Waka Flocka Flame	No Hands feat Roscoe Dash & Wale	Cold Blank's Clean Radio Mix; Cold Blank's Dirty Radio Mix	2011
Dr Dre & Snoop Dogg	Nuthin' But A G Thang	Cold Blank Remix	2013
Disclosure	Latch feat. Sam Smith	Cold Blank Remix	2014

=== Unreleased ===
Song	Artist	Year
Louder Than Bombs feat. Krewella	Cold Blank	2014

=== Mashup packs ===
Name	Release date
Official WMC 2013 Mashup Pack	March 2013
Juicy Wiggle Yank Pack	April 2013
