= Rubberz =

AI-generated 2026 single by Fenix Flexin and Purps on the Beat

Single by Fenix Flexin and Purps on the Beat
- Released: June 5, 2026
- Genre: Dance-pop; synth-pop
- Length: 2:53
- Label: Flexxd Up Ent; Empire

Fenix Flexin singles chronology
"Steak with Lobster" (2026)	"Rubberz" (2026)

Audio sample
- file; help

Music video
- "Rubberz" on YouTube

"Rubberz" is a song generated with artificial intelligence (AI) credited to American rapper Fenix Flexin and American producer Purps on the Beat. It was released on June 5, 2026 through Flexxd Up Ent and Empire Distribution. It is a synth-pop and dance-pop song about hedonism.

Upon the song's release, "Rubberz" became the subject of allegations it was AI-generated, which both Flexin and Purps initially denied for months. In August 2026, after several investigations concluded that the song was generated using AI, Fenix eventually admitted to its use. "Rubberz" is notably the first fully AI-generated song to appear on the Billboard Hot 100, peaking at number 58. Several publications further deemed it the song of the summer.

== Composition ==
"Rubberz" is a synth-pop and dance-pop song with influence from pop rap and new wave. On the track, an AI voice of Fenix Flexin sings in a British accent, which has been compared to British singer Morrissey. Lyrical themes include hedonism and heartbreak.

== Critical reception ==
"Rubberz" has been called the song of the summer by multiple outlets. Jon Caramanica and Joe Coscarelli of The New York Times ranked "Rubberz" third in their list of songs of the summer. Gabriel Bras Nevares of HotNewHipHop praised the song for its "comical but nonetheless earnest and fun contrast between Fenix's flexing and more emotive writing", writing that the vocal and melodic performance "hits a nice balance between being easy-going and yearning." Pitchfork's Alphonse Pierre called the song "incredibly goofy" and "far too strange for AI", choosing to believe Flexin's denial of the AI allegations at the time. Kelefa Sanneh of The New Yorker compared the track to OMD's "If You Leave" (1986), adding that "the sharp backbeat and arpeggiated synthesizers remind us of an earlier and perhaps simpler time".

== Controversy ==
Upon its release, "Rubberz" faced several accusations of being AI-generated. Flexin denied the allegations in the comments of a video of himself performing the song on On the Radar Radio; he attributed the song's distinctive sound to its Auto-Tune reverb and British accent. AI detection platform HumanStandard attributed the song to the AI music platform Treblo (previously known as Sonauto).

In July and August 2026, a breakdown of the track by producer Medasin that alleged the song was generated using Treblo went viral on social media, highlighting a snippet of a separate song that Flexin posted that had "Sonauto.mp3" in the file name. Flexin denied generative AI usage in a since deleted response showing a Pro Tools project of "Rubberz", which was later proven to be further deception. In August 2026, Treblo co-founder Ryan Tremblay stated that the song was generated using the platform. An analysis by The Verge found that the song had "a number of artifacts and anomalies that are commonly found in AI-generated music." Flexin eventually admitted to the use of AI in generating the song, though falsely claimed that he had never denied it and was unaware of Treblo until the song was mixed.

== Charts ==
Chart performance for "Rubberz"
Chart (2026)	Peak position
Honduras Anglo Airplay (Monitor Latino)	3
UK Singles (Official Charts)	90
US Billboard Hot 100	58
US Rhythmic Airplay (Billboard)	5

== See also ==
- Starface, an album credited to Tyga also generated with Treblo
- "We Are Charlie Kirk", another AI-generated song
