= Hurricane Jane =

Single by Black Kids

from the album Partie Traumatic
- B-side: "You Only Call Me When You're Crying, Power in the Blood"
- Released: June 23, 2008
- Recorded: December 2007–February 2008
- Genre: Indie pop
- Label: Almost Gold AGUK2
- Songwriter(s): Reggie Youngblood, Owen Holmes, Kevin Snow, Dawn Watley, Ali Youngblood
- Producer(s): Bernard Butler

Black Kids singles chronology
"I'm Not Gonna Teach Your Boyfriend How to Dance with You" (2008)	"Hurricane Jane" (2008)	"Look at Me (When I Rock Wichoo)" (2008)

"Hurricane Jane" is a song by American indie rock band Black Kids. It was released as the second single from their debut album Partie Traumatic in the UK by Almost Gold Recordings on June 23, 2008. A demo version of the song appeared on the band's 2007 EP Wizard of Ahhhs. It also featured as the soundtrack of Konami game, Pro Evolution Soccer 2010.

The chorus lyric "it's Friday night and I ain't got nobody" is borrowed from Sam Cooke's song "Another Saturday Night", which has the lyric "another Saturday night and I ain't got nobody."

== Track listings ==
All songs by Black Kids.

7" single (white vinyl)

1. "Hurricane Jane"
2. "Power in the Blood"

7" single (orange vinyl)

1. "Hurricane Jane"
2. "You Only Call Me When You're Crying"

CD single

1. "Hurricane Jane"
2. "Hurricane Jane (The Cansecos Remix)"

== Music video ==
The music video for "Hurricane Jane" was filmed in London in April 2008 and directed by Rozan & Schmeltz.

== Personnel ==
- Owen Holmes – bass guitar
- Kevin Snow – drums
- Dawn Watley – keyboards and vocals
- Ali Youngblood – keyboards and vocals
- Reggie Youngblood – guitar and vocals

== Chart performance ==
Chart (2008)	Peak position
UK Singles (OCC)	36
