= Dawn of the Dead (song) =

Single by Does It Offend You, Yeah?

from the album You Have No Idea What You're Getting Yourself Into
- Released: 24 August 2008
- Recorded: 2007
- Genre: Dance-punk, synthpop
- Length: 3:29
- Label: Virgin Records
- Songwriter: Does It Offend You, Yeah?

"Dawn of the Dead" is the fourth single by Does It Offend You, Yeah? taken from the band's debut album You Have No Idea What You're Getting Yourself Into. It is their most successful single to date peaking at #41 on the UK Singles Chart. It ranked at #64 in the Triple J Hottest 100, 2008.

== Track listing ==
1. "Dawn of the Dead" (radio edit) - 3:29
2. "Dawn of the Dead" (Hadouken! remix) - 5:23
3. "Dawn of the Dead" (live at Koko) - 4:00
4. "Game Over" - 4:16
5. "Tales of the Chameleon" - 3:39

== Charts ==
Chart (2008)	Peak position
UK Singles Chart	41
