= Partie Traumatic =

Studio album by Black Kids
- Released: July 7, 2008
- Recorded: December 2007 – April 2008
- Studio: West Heath Studios, London, England
- Genre: Indie rock, indie pop
- Length: 38:09
- Label: Almost Gold / Columbia (USA); Mercury (EU)
- Producer: Bernard Butler

Black Kids chronology
Partie Traumatic (2008)	ROOKIE (2017)

Singles from Partie Traumatic
- 1. "I'm Not Gonna Teach Your Boyfriend How to Dance with You" Released: April 7, 2008; 2. "Hurricane Jane" Released: June 23, 2008; 3. "Look at Me (When I Rock Wichoo)" Released: September 8, 2008

Professional ratings
Aggregate scores
Source	Rating
Metacritic	75/100
Review scores
Source	Rating
AllMusic	4/5 stars
The A.V. Club	B
Entertainment Weekly	B+
The Guardian	4/5 stars
MSN Music (Consumer Guide)	A−
NME	8/10
Pitchfork	3.3/10
Q	4/5 stars
Rolling Stone	3.5/5 stars
Spin	4/5 stars

Partie Traumatic is the debut album by American Indie rock band Black Kids, released by Almost Gold on July 7, 2008 in the United Kingdom, and released by Columbia Records on July 22, 2008 in North America. The album debuted at #5 on the UK Albums chart and placed on several year-end best albums lists.

According to bassist Owen Holmes, the album got its title from an instructional Artie Traum DVD on how to play the guitar which Holmes and Reggie Youngblood rented from their local library. The band played with the name Artie Traum, calling him Partie Traum and eventually Partie Traumatic.

== Track listing ==
All songs written by Black Kids

1. "Hit the Heartbrakes" – 3:44
2. "Partie Traumatic" – 3:10
3. "Listen to Your Body Tonight" – 3:08
4. "Hurricane Jane" – 4:32
5. "I'm Making Eyes at You" – 4:30
6. "I've Underestimated My Charm (Again)" – 3:55
7. "I'm Not Gonna Teach Your Boyfriend How to Dance with You" – 3:37
8. "Love Me Already" – 4:04
9. "I Wanna Be Your Limousine" – 3:16
10. "Look at Me (When I Rock Wichoo)" – 4:10

== Usage in media ==
"Hit the Heartbrakes" was used in the mobile phone game, First Touch Soccer 2015. "Partie Traumatic" was used in Midnight Club: Los Angeles. "Hurricane Jane" was used in the football game by Konami, Pro Evolution Soccer 2010. "I'm Not Gonna Teach Your Boyfriend How to Dance with You" was used as The Twelves remix version in the EA Sports game, FIFA 09 and also the 2008 comedy film Role Models.

== Personnel ==
- Owen Holmes – bass guitar
- Kevin Snow – drums
- Dawn Watley – keyboards and vocals
- Ali Youngblood – keyboards and vocals
- Reggie Youngblood – guitar and vocals
- Makoto Sakamoto – bongos on "Partie Traumatic" and "Love Me Already"
- Producer: Bernard Butler
- Mastering: Chris Potter at Alchemy Studio
- Engineer: Seb Lewsley
- Mixing: Lexxx at Miloco Studios and Olympic Studios
- Assisting: David Emery, Matt Paul, Adrian Breakspear
- Album design: Brendon Clark and Black Kids
- Photography: Dean Chalkley
- Published by Universal Music Publishing Ltd.
- Recorded at West Heath Studios In England

== Charts ==
Chart (2008)	Peak position
Australian Albums (ARIA Charts)	88
UK Albums Chart	5
US Billboard 200	127

== Honors ==
- Best of 2008 (#4) – New York Post, December 2008
- 50 Best Albums of the Year (#39) – The Observer, December 2008
- The 40 Best Albums of 2008 (#22) – Spin, December 2008
- The Top 50 Albums of 2008 (#43) – NME, December 2008
