= Rob Bloomfield =

Bobby Bloomfield
- Also known as: Bobby Bloomfield
- Born: Robert Bloomfield; Paris, France
- Genres: Dance, rock, indie
- Occupations: Record producer, audio engineer, musician
- Years active: 2004–present
- Website: bobbybloomfield.com

Bobby Bloomfield is an actor and former record producer living in Los Angeles, California. He trained at Groundlings in Hollywood, and the Royal Academy of Dramatic Arts in London.

Bloomfield founded The Rattle - a music and music tech incubator based in specially built studio spaces shared by artists and music startups in London and Los Angeles. He is also a former member of the British dance-punk group Does It Offend You, Yeah?.

Bloomfield's list of music credits work includes writing, composition, production and remixes for Does It Offend You, Yeah?, 50 Cent, Linkin Park, The Faint, Natalia Kills, dan le sac vs Scroobius Pip, Christopher Lee and Vienna Ditto. Bloomfield has also produced music for Audi, La Redoute and Barclaycard commercials and for the HBO movie Hollywood Flies. He has played in various bands including Does It Offend You, Yeah? and he is a relative of the English labouring class poet Robert Bloomfield.

== Pre-Rattle credits ==
Selected production credits:

- 2004: Barclaycard (commercial) – The Key (Writer/Producer)
- 2005: Hollywood Flies (film) – (Composer)
- 2006 Sixnationstate -Taking Me Over (Jeepster Recordings) - (Producer)
- 2008: Does It Offend You, Yeah – You Have No Idea What You're Getting Yourself Into (Writer/Drums/Bass/Guitar/Backing vocals)
- 2009: The Faint – The Geeks Were Right (Remixer)
- 2010: Natalia Kills – Zombie (Remixer)
- 2010: Linkin Park - The Catalyst (Remixer)
- 2010: 50 Cent - Do You Think About Me (Remixer)
- 2010: Escape The Fate – Issues (Remixer)
- 2011: Does It Offend You, Yeah – Don't Say We Didn't Warn You (Writer/Drums/Bass/Guitar/Backing Vocals)
- 2012: Kamikaze Test Pilots – Kamikaze Test Pilots (Producer)
- 2012: Vienna Ditto – I Know His Blood (Producer)
- 2012: The Adelines – Little Games (Producer)
- 2013: The Adelines – Alleyways (Producer)
- 2013: La Redoute (commercial) – Bass Is A Rebel (Producer/Writer)
- 2014: Audi (commercial) – Goodbye 2013, Hello 2014 (Producer/Writer)
- 2014: V&D (commercial) – V&D Festival (Producer/Writer)
- 2014: Christopher Lee – Toreador (Mixer/additional production)
- 2018: Too Many Ts - (As "The Rattle")
- 2018: DJ Questionmark - (As "The Rattle")
- 2019: Inigo Blue & The System - (As "The Rattle")
- 2019: Calista Kazuko - (As "The Rattle")
- 2019: PENGSHUi - (As "The Rattle")
