= The Agenda (album) =

Studio album by Cold Blank
- Released: 6 August 2012
- Recorded: 2011
- Length: 53:01
- Label: Burn The Fire Records
- Producers: Christopher Gaspar; Manuel Luquin

Singles from The Agenda
- 1. "Louder Than Bombs" Released: 7 May 2012; 2. "Deception" Released: 4 June 2012; 3. "Onslaught" Released: 2 July 2012

The Agenda is the first studio album by Cold Blank released on 6 August 2012 through Burn the Fire Records. Notable collaborators on the album include Andy Taylor (formerly of Duran Duran) and Blake Miller, with press coverage ranging from MTV Music's "MTV Hive", DJ Times, and Artistdirect. In addition, following the album's release, Cold Blank was nominated in the ‘Top 100 DJs In America’ poll by DJ Times magazine, America’s first magazine dedicated to DJs and DJ culture.

== Track listing ==
No.	Title	Music	Length
1.	"Onslaught"	Cold Blank, Andy Taylor	5:07
2.	"Fire"	Cold Blank, Neon Stereo	6:11
3.	"Bloodthirst"	Cold Blank, Electric Soulside	6:29
4.	"Louder Than Bombs"	Cold Blank	4:24
5.	"Deception" (feat Blake Miller)	Cold Blank	5:07
6.	"Los Angeles"	Cold Blank	4:44
7.	"The Downfall" (feat Veela)	Cold Blank	4:35
8.	"Nirvana"	Cold Blank	7:03
9.	"Signs Of Chaos"	Cold Blank	4:23
10.	"2012"	Cold Blank	6:27
