= Song of the summer =

Term for commercially popular music during the summer

In the Northern Hemisphere, a song of the summer is an unofficial designation of a song that is dominant both culturally and commercially between the end of May and the beginning of September in a given year, primarily in the United States. Although the idea of a song of the summer had been around as early as the 1910s, it became a common term in the 1990s. By the early 2000s, achieving the label of "song of the summer" became a competition urged on by media outlets. In the 21st century, the growing fragmentation of musical sources has made it more difficult for a single song to become overwhelmingly pervasive.

== Description ==
The common characteristic of a song of the summer is that there is universal awareness: it is a song that people hear everywhere they go, and is a viral phenomenon. The song of the summer can be so ubiquitous that many get sick of hearing it. It is the dominant song between Memorial Day and Labor Day, the song that "defines the season on the charts and in listeners' memories". The determination of the song of summer is achieved by popular consensus, but is often the song that ranks longest at top of the Hot 100 between June and September. The song of the summer is a question open annually to public debate, not an objective description.

In The Washington Post, Chris Richards describes the song of the summer as "that magical megahit capable of changing the nation's psychic temperature". In 1995, New York declared that a true song of the summer had to be released in the summer, be easily turned into a slogan, and be so catchy that people cannot get it out of their heads. Variety's designation of song of the summer is based primarily on audio streams between the weekend after the June equinox and Labor Day. In The Wall Street Journal, John Jurgensen proposed that the number of covers a song inspires can be an indicator of the song of the summer, pointing out more than 40,000 videos of Daft Punk's "Get Lucky" made by fans.

The song of the summer is generally a high-energy song. Music journalist Greg Kot describes the song of the summer as energetic, catchy songs that "rule their summer", such as 1989's "Lambada" by Kaoma, 1999's "Livin' la Vida Loca" by Ricky Martin, 2002's "The Ketchup Song" by Las Ketchup, and 2012's "Gangnam Style" by Psy.

== History ==
An examination of the history of the song of the summer in Vox notes that a 1910 article in the New York Tribune says "About this time look out for the summer song", in the days when songs were primarily distributed as sheet music, and cites as an example the hit song of the summer of 1923, which was "Yes, We Have No Bananas", selling a million copies in three months.

In 1979, a Canadian newspaper described "My Sharona" by the Knack as "the runaway song of the summer". Hits such as "Summer in the City" by the Lovin' Spoonful (1966), had dominated their summers, but public attention to naming a song of the summer began in the 1990s. Music critic Ann Powers introduced a bracket-style competition for song of the summer of 1999 in The New York Times. The bracket-style tournament was later used by MTV's Video Music Awards for its "Song of the Summer" category.

Billboard started its Songs of the Summer chart in 2010, and published retroactive charts back to 1958. The Billboard Songs of the Summer chart was originally based on sales and radio play; streaming data was added to its calculations in 2012, and YouTube streams in 2013. The first song of the summer on Billboard's chart was "California Gurls" by Katy Perry and Snoop Dogg.

Achieving song of the summer became competitive in 2013 and 2014. Publications began publishing articles in June to label contenders and offer predictions. In 2013, Stephen Colbert satirized the song of the summer competition on The Colbert Report.

Multiple media outlets stated that 2025 failed to produce a song of the summer. Billboard predicts even less consensus for song of the summer in the future as market share becomes more diffuse across niche genres and streaming platforms. In 2026, several outlets recognized the AI-generated song "Rubberz" as the song of the summer.

== Shared musical experience ==
Summer lends itself to a shared musical experience: people are outside more often, exposed to communal music and open-air listening. Before the 21st century, the song of the summer was widely heard throughout common spaces. People would hear the same songs on car radios blasting in traffic, in stores and malls, at clubs and parties. The monoculture of Top 40 radio became fragmented as radio formats expanded and multiple avenues of music streaming became available, leading to wider musical choices but also making it more difficult for a single song to permeate popular culture. Ontario music writer Joel Rubinoff says, "If a song can break through the din and clamour of our fragmented selfie universe to connect on a universal level, we can, for an instant, feel like we're part of something bigger."

Time magazine noted the difficulty of identifying a song of the summer in 2020, when the COVID-19 pandemic and the isolation social distancing reduced the opportunities of a shared musical experience. It also observed the impact of TikTok on popular music. Fragmented music experiences produce multiple contenders for song of the summer.

== See also ==
- Summer hit
- MTV Video Music Award for Song of Summer
