= We Are Rockstars =

Single by Does It Offend You, Yeah?

from the album You Have No Idea What You're Getting Yourself Into
- Released: 11 February 2008
- Recorded: 2006–2007
- Length: 2:58
- Label: Virgin
- Songwriter: Does It Offend You, Yeah?

"We Are Rockstars" is the third single by Does It Offend You, Yeah? taken from the band's debut album You Have No Idea What You're Getting Yourself Into. It was the first song made entirely from synthesizers and music software from the band when it was a two-piece duo with James Rushent and Dan Coop. In 2007, the then-six piece band recorded parts for the song for their first album.

In 2009, electro house producers Cold Blank released a bootleg remix of "We Are Rockstars".

== Charts ==
Chart (2008)	Peak position
UK Singles Chart	177

== Personnel ==
- James Rushent – vocals, all instruments, production
- Dan Coop – all instruments, production
