= Black Kids =

American indie rock and synth-pop band

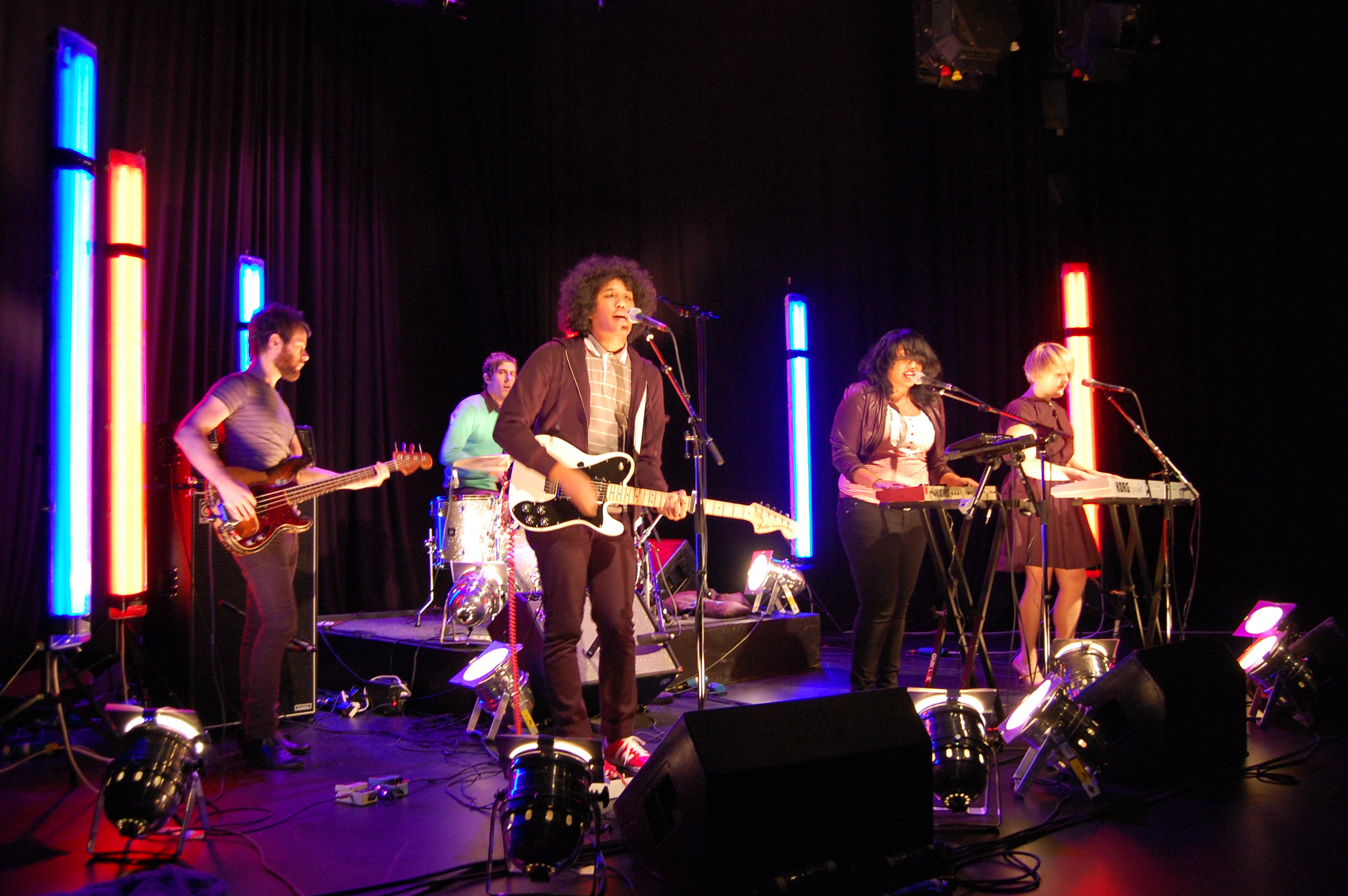
- Black Kids performing live at the MTV UK studios on January 23, 2008

Background information
- Origin: Jacksonville, Florida
- Genres: Indie pop; synth-pop
- Years active: 2006–present
- Labels: Almost Gold, Columbia
- Members: Reggie Youngblood; Ali Youngblood; Dawn Watley; Owen Holmes
- Past members: Kevin Snow
- Website: blackkidstv.com

Black Kids are an American indie rock and synth-pop band formed in 2006 in Jacksonville, Florida. The band was formed by Reginald "Reggie" Youngblood (lead vocals, guitar), Ali Youngblood (keyboards, backing vocals), Dawn Watley (keyboards, backing vocals), Owen Holmes (bass guitar), and Kevin Snow (drums).

They first gained international attention with their 2007 EP Wizard of Ahhhs, followed by their debut studio album Partie Traumatic (2008), which reached number five on the UK Albums Chart and included the hit single "I'm Not Gonna Teach Your Boyfriend How to Dance with You". After a hiatus, they returned in 2017 with their second album Rookie and have remained intermittently active since.

== History ==
=== Formation and breakthrough (2006–2007) ===
Black Kids formed in Jacksonville, Florida, in January 2006. The lineup featured siblings Reggie and Ali Youngblood, along with Dawn Watley, Owen Holmes, and Kevin Snow. The band initially performed locally, including shows with Tilly and the Wall, Now It's Overhead, Elf Power, and Shiny Toy Guns.

In 2007, Black Kids recorded eight songs with producer Jesse Mangum at The Glow Studios in Jacksonville. Four of these were uploaded as free downloads on MySpace as the Wizard of Ahhhs EP in August (all eight tracks were later released as the Extended Ahhhhhhhs 12” LP in 2022).

The band’s breakthrough came after a performance at the Athens PopFest in August 2007, which attracted attention from NME, The Guardian, Vice, and The Village Voice. In the wake of the national attention, Wizard of Ahhhs earned widespread critical acclaim, including a "Best New Music" distinction from Pitchfork, which gave it a score of 8.4/10.

Black Kids’ rise was emblematic of the late-2000s blog era, when online buzz could propel new artists to international attention almost overnight. They quickly signed with Quest Management, which also represented Björk and Arcade Fire. In October 2007, the band performed at the CMJ Music Marathon in New York City, earning further exposure in The New York Times and USA Today. They then embarked on a brief London tour in December 2007. Rolling Stone named them one of ten "Artists to Watch" for 2008, and they were also included in the BBC's Sound of 2008 poll.

=== Partie Traumatic era (2008–2009) ===
In early 2008, the band recorded their debut album Partie Traumatic in London with producer Bernard Butler, former guitarist of Suede. The lead single, "I'm Not Gonna Teach Your Boyfriend How to Dance with You," was released in April and debuted at number 11 on the UK Singles Chart, followed by "Hurricane Jane," which peaked at number 36. The album was released in July on Columbia Records in North America and Almost Gold internationally, debuting at number 5 on the UK Albums Chart.

Following the enthusiastic reception of Wizard of Ahhhs, anticipation for Black Kids’ debut studio album was high. When Partie Traumatic was released, however, reviews were more mixed, and several outlets that had initially praised the band offered more restrained assessments. Notably, Pitchfork, which had awarded the EP a “Best New Music” distinction, gave the album a score of 3.3 out of 10, accompanying the rating with an image of two sad dogs and the word “sorry.” The abrupt shift in critical sentiment led many observers to cite Black Kids as an example of the volatility of blog-era hype and the challenges faced by artists propelled to early fame through online buzz.

Nevertheless, the album also received many positive reviews from outlets such as Rolling Stone and The Guardian, and ultimately was included on several year-end best-of lists (e.g. NME, Spin, The Observer, and the New York Post).

The band toured the United Kingdom in early 2008, including the Vice Live Tour with Friendly Fires and Ipso Facto, a Sons and Daughters tour, and a Kate Nash tour. In the spring, they toured the United States as an opening act for Cut Copy.

Black Kids made several television appearances in 2008, including Later... with Jools Holland on April 1, Friday Night with Jonathan Ross on June 1, Late Show with David Letterman on July 24, Jimmy Kimmel Live! on September 5, and The Tonight Show with Jay Leno on October 17. They also appeared on Last Call with Carson Daly on May 7, 2009.

In the spring and summer of 2008, Black Kids played the festival circuit in the U.S. and the UK, including Coachella in April, Radio 1's Big Weekend in May, Glastonbury in June, and T in the Park and Camp Bestival in July. In August they appeared at Lollapalooza. The band then headlined an international tour in the U.S. and Europe from June to November, followed by Japan in December.

In 2009, they performed at the Big Day Out festivals in New Zealand and Australia, and toured with Kaiser Chiefs in the U.K. and Mates of State in the U.S.

Their music appeared in several pop culture moments: "I'm Not Gonna Teach Your Boyfriend How to Dance with You" featured in films such as Role Models (2008), American Teen (2008), Jennifer's Body (2009), and the trailer for Fame (2009). It was also used in the TV shows Gossip Girl, 90210, and 2 Broke Girls. A remix version of the song by The Twelves was used in FIFA 09 and was the basis for the cast performance of the song in an episode of Glee in May 2011.

Black Kids appeared in an episode of Yo Gabba Gabba in March 2010, performing "We Love Clowns" as the Dance Kids.

=== Hiatus and side projects (2010–2014) ===
After touring, the band entered a period of reduced activity. Some material was recorded for a planned second album in 2010, but the project was ultimately shelved. The band toured sporadically during this period. Bassist Owen Holmes recorded under the solo moniker Gospel Music, releasing work through Kill Rock Stars. Reggie Youngblood relocated to Athens, Georgia, and formed the power pop band Blunt Bangs, which later released its own material. Kevin Snow departed the group in 2014.

=== Return with Rookie (2015–2018) ===
In 2015, Black Kids regrouped in Athens and began recording new material at Chase Park Transduction studio with producer Andy LeMaster. Their comeback album, Rookie, was released on September 15, 2017, preceded by singles "Obligatory Drugs," "If My Heart Is Broken," and "IFFY". The music video for “IFFY” was created by TV on the Radio's Kyp Malone. The band toured the U.S. in support of the album, including a release show at the Echoplex in Los Angeles.

=== Continuing activity (2019–present) ===
Following Rookie, Black Kids remains active with occasional tours and has stated plans for a third studio album, with Reggie Youngblood describing it as the completion of a "trilogy" of records.

== Musical style and influences ==
Black Kids’ sound blends elements of indie rock, new wave, and synth-pop, characterized by bright melodies, energetic rhythms, and playful yet introspective lyrics. Critics have compared their sound to The Cure, Arcade Fire, and The B-52s.

== Discography ==
=== Studio albums ===
Title	Details	Peak chart positions				
Title	Details	US	AUS	FRA	IRE	UK
Partie Traumatic	Released: July 7, 2008 (UK), July 22, 2008 (US); Label: Almost Gold, Columbia; Formats: CD, LP, digital download	127	88	120	63	5
Rookie	Released: September 15, 2017; Formats: CD, LP, digital download	—	—	—	—	—

=== Extended plays ===
Title	Details
Wizard of Ahhhs	Release date: August 2007; Formats: Digital download
Cemetery Lips	Release date: April 7, 2009; Label: Columbia; Formats: Digital download

=== Singles ===
Title	Year	Peak chart positions	Album
Title	Year	UK	Album
"I'm Not Gonna Teach Your Boyfriend How to Dance with You"	2008	11	Partie Traumatic
"Hurricane Jane"	2008	36	Partie Traumatic
"Look at Me (When I Rock Wichoo)"	2008	175	Partie Traumatic
"Obligatory Drugs"	2017	—	Rookie
"If My Heart Is Broken"	2017	—	Rookie
"IFFY"	2017	—	Rookie
"In a Song"	2017	—	Rookie

=== Promotional singles ===
Title	Year	Album
"I'm Making Eyes at You"	2008	Partie Traumatic
"Egyptian Shumba"	2009	Ray-Ban Remasters
