= This Is Next – Indie's Biggest Hits Volume 1 =

Compilation album by various artists
- Released: August 21, 2007
- Genre: Indie
- Label: Vice

This Is Next – Indie's Biggest Hits Volume 1 is a compilation album released by Vice Records on August 21, 2007.

== Reception ==
Professional ratings
Review scores
Source	Rating
AllMusic	3/5 stars
The A.V. Club	B−
IGN	6.7/10
Pitchfork	0.0/10
PopMatters	5/10

This Is Next – Indie's Biggest Hits Volume 1 received mixed to negative reviews from music critics. Jason Lymangrover of AllMusic said that "hopefully, listeners will walk away from this release educated enough to dig further into their favorite artists' back catalogs". Michaelangelo Matos of The A.V. Club noted that "those who know and love these songs have probably already made a better mix-CD than this one". Chad Grischow of IGN described it as "a solid collection of some of rock's best current acts, but it is not exactly major label free". Matt LeMay of Pitchfork described it as "a reminder that it's not the bands that sell out, it's the business". Evan Sawdey of PopMatters asked, "Do you really need this album to begin with?"

According to Pitchfork, the album sold roughly 1,000 copies in its first week.

== Track listing ==
No.	Title	Writer(s)	Artist and album	Length
1.	"The Prayer"	Russell Lissack, Gordon Moakes, Kele Okereke, Matt Tong	Bloc Party from A Weekend in the City	3:43
2.	"Cheated Hearts"	Brian Chase, Karen Orzolek, Nick Zinner	Yeah Yeah Yeahs from Show Your Bones	3:53
3.	"Do You Believe in Rapture?"	Thurston Moore	Sonic Youth from Rather Ripped	3:11
4.	"Phantom Limb"	James Mercer	The Shins from Wincing the Night Away	4:48
5.	"The Underdog"	Britt Daniel	Spoon from Ga Ga Ga Ga Ga	3:41
6.	"Four Winds"	Conor Oberst	Bright Eyes from Four Winds	4:13
7.	"Lived in Bars"	Chan Marshall	Cat Power from The Greatest	3:42
8.	"Hold On, Hold On"	Neko Case, Dallas Good, Travis Good, Sean Dean, Mike Belitsky	Neko Case from Fox Confessor Brings the Flood	2:40
9.	"Heimdalsgate Like a Promethean Curse"	Kevin Barnes	Of Montreal from Hissing Fauna, Are You the Destroyer?	3:15
10.	"The Perfect Me"	John Dieterich, Satomi Matsuzaki, Greg Saunier	Deerhoof from Friend Opportunity	2:37
11.	"Chips Ahoy!"	Craig Finn, Tad Kubler, Franz Nicolay	The Hold Steady from Boys and Girls in America	3:06
12.	"Hang Me Up to Dry"	Nathan Willett, Jonathan Bo Russell, Matt Aveiro, Matt Maust	Cold War Kids from Robbers & Cowards	3:37
13.	"Colleen"	Ted Leo	Ted Leo and the Pharmacists from Living with the Living	3:06
14.	"Chinese Translation"	Matt Ward	M. Ward from Post-War	3:58
15.	"Satan Said Dance"	Alec Ounsworth	Clap Your Hands Say Yeah from Some Loud Thunder	5:30
