= Does It Offend You, Yeah? =

British dance-punk band

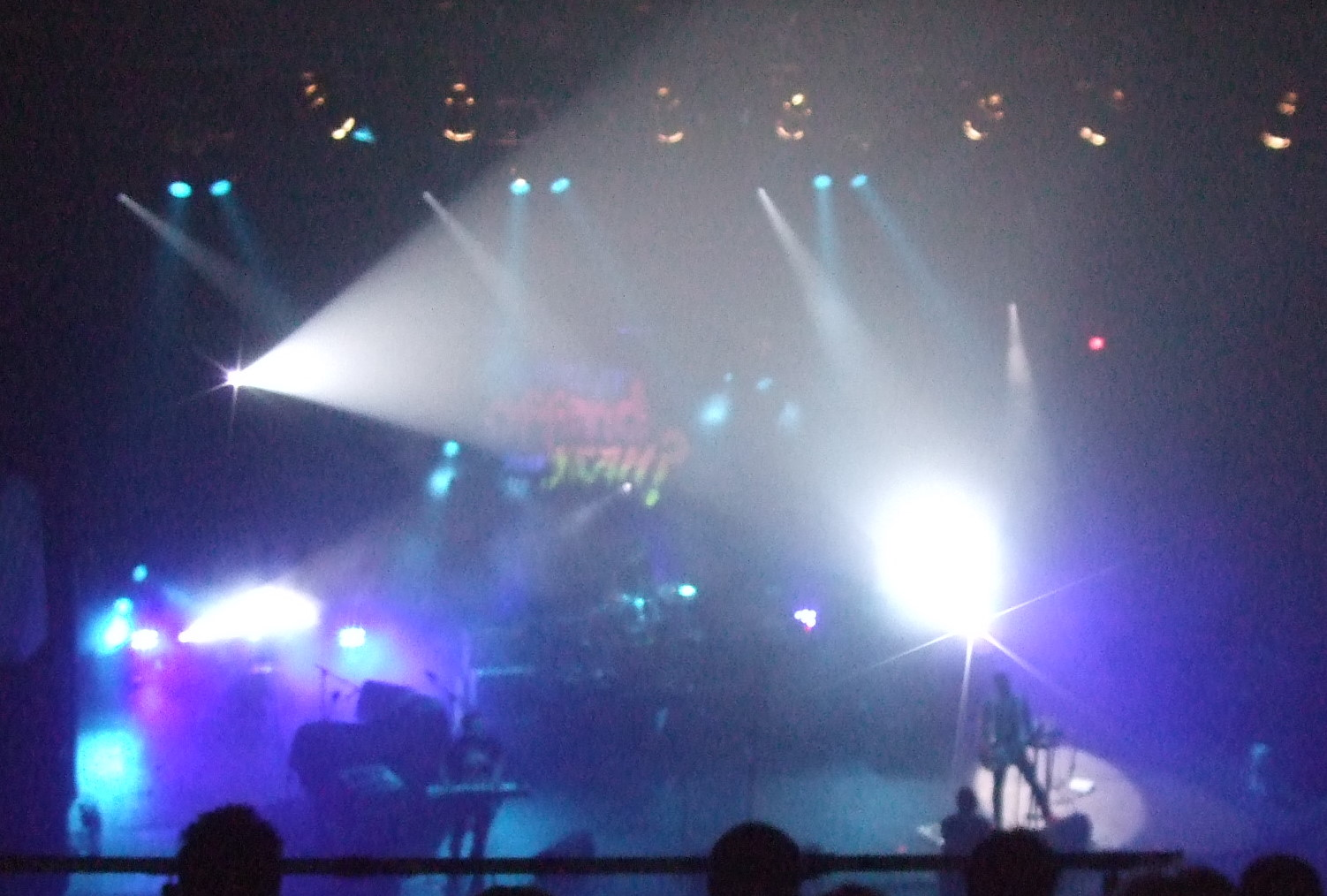
- Does It Offend You, Yeah? during the NME Awards Tour in 2008.

Background information
- Also known as: DIOYY; DIOYY?; Does It Offend You?
- Origin: Reading, England
- Genres: Dance-punk; electro house; synth-pop; new rave
- Years active: 2006–2012; 2015; 2021–present
- Labels: Almost Gold; Startime (America); Cooking Vinyl (UK)
- Members: James Rushent; Dan Coop; Matty Derham
- Past members: Rob Bloomfield
- Website: doesitoffendyou.com

Does It Offend You, Yeah? are an English dance-punk band from Reading, Berkshire. They played their final show on 12 December 2015 at the Electric Ballroom, Camden Town. In September 2021, they announced a new album, titled We Do Our Own Stunts.

== History ==
Does It Offend You, Yeah?, named after a quote from the BBC television series The Office, were formed in 2006 in Reading, UK by James Rushent and Dan Coop.

They released their first album, You Have No Idea What You're Getting Yourself Into, in Spring 2008. It was written and performed by James Rushent, Rob Bloomfield and Dan Coop. Death From Above 1979 vocalist Sebastien Grainger performed the lead vocals on "Let's Make Out". The song "All the Same" was due to be featured in the album, but was dropped despite featuring in Electronic Arts' Need for Speed: Hot Pursuit. "All the Same" was released on streaming platforms in December 2022.

Does It Offend You, Yeah? were the ninth most-listened-to new band of 2008 on last.fm and were included in the best alternative music list of 2008 on iTunes USA. They were announced as a Rolling Stone breaking Artist in 2008.

In 2009, Chloe Duveaux and Matty Derham (from Fields) joined the band. Their follow up album, Don't Say We Didn't Warn You, was released in 2011, and peaked at number 3 in the UK Dance chart and number 11 in the Indie chart. The album was executive produced by James Rushent's father Martin,

Rolling Stone compared them to Daft Punk, Justice and Rage Against the Machine NME compares them to bands like Muse due to their heavier, more "live" sound.

Lead singer James Rushent co-produced The Prodigy's "Omen", as well as their song "Invaders Must Die". Rushent has also remixed songs for acts such as Muse, The Raconteurs and Bloc Party. Bloomfield has remixed songs for 50 Cent, dan le sac vs Scroobius Pip and P Diddy.

In April 2012 the band released a statement via Facebook that they are now on 'indefinite hiatus'. The statement also revealed that both James Rushent and Dan Coop are working on an electronic music project.

In November 2015 a new EP with the title "How To Kiss a Dragon and Walk Away From It" was announced for early 2016. When asked if the band had broken up, the band clarified in the comments that the status of the band was "complicated, not as black and white as people may see it." The band said that if most people think of a band as "start writing, do an album, major label promotion wheel starts up, do a tour/sell the t-shirts, have a holiday, start writing, do an album...then yes, we've broken up." The band then went on to clarify that if others think of a band as "a couple of mates fucking about when we have enough time from our day jobs, and have enough tracks for an EP...then yes, we're still a band."

=== Tours ===
In 2008, Does It Offend You, Yeah? completed a headline US tour which reached its climax at the historic Troubadour club in Hollywood. At the show, lead singer James Rushent broke his leg during their last song, although he managed to hobble back on stage for an encore before being rushed to hospital.

At the start of 2008 they went on the NME Awards Tour, alongside The Ting Tings. They then completed their own headline tour of the UK supported by South Central and Lets Talk Tactics.

They went on to open for Bloc Party and Nine Inch Nails on their respective 2008 North American tours. They were also the opening act for The Prodigy on the last date of their UK 2008 club tour.

Does It Offend You, Yeah? have made festival appearances at Coachella, Lollapalooza, South by Southwest, Glastonbury, Reading / Leeds Festival, Summer Sonic, Wireless Festival, Monolith, Global Gathering, Street Scene, Pukkelpop, Dour, Printemps de Bourges, Les Eurockéennes, Vieilles Charrues, Hurricane, Southside, Oxegen, Lowlands, Gatecrasher, Jersey Live, Parklife, V Festival, Pohoda, Exit, NASS Fest and Melt! Festival As well as Strawberry Festival and Zebra Festival in China.

The band supported the Prodigy on their Australasian and Irish leg of the Invaders Must Die Tour and played at the Warrior's Dance Festival in Milton Keynes, England.

They toured with Linkin Park on the A Thousand Suns World Tour UK leg in November 2010 and completed the tour alongside the Prodigy and Pendulum in Northern America.

The band embarked on a headlining UK tour in March 2011 to promote their latest album Don't Say We Didn't Warn You. They were supported by Hounds and Tripwires.

In August 2015, the band announced a final, one-off gig at the Electric Ballroom in Camden Town on 12 December 2015.

=== DJ projects ===
Does It Offend You, Yeah? also DJ at various clubs and festivals across the world. They have done so on the same bill as acts such as, Justice, Peaches, MSTRKRFT, Simian Mobile Disco, Steve Aoki, DJ AM, Ladytron, Samantha Ronson and 2 Many DJ's.

=== Final show ===
The band shared a transmission via their Facebook on 11 August announcing they will play their final show at the Electric Ballroom on 12 December 2015. Setlist included all songs from "You Have No Idea What You're Getting Yourself Into" and most of "Don't Say We Didn't Warn You", as well as new songs "Let's Go" and "Stormy Weather". The band closed with "Epic Last Song" along with "We Are Rockstars".

=== Return ===
On 1 July 2021, the band announced another show via social media, to take place on 23 December 2021 at the Electric Ballroom in London. The show was later rescheduled for 5 May 2022.

On 17 September 2021, Does It Offend You Yeah? premiered a teaser video on their YouTube channel, announcing a comeback album titled We Do Our Own Stunts.

On 14 April 2022, the band premiered their new single, "Guess Who Just Rolled Back into Town" on their Facebook page and YouTube channel.

== Band name ==
The band revealed the origins of their name as being from the sitcom The Office.

Everybody thinks the name is some kind of statement but it's a quote from David Brent in an episode of The Office. "When me and James Rushent first started writing music together we decided to put it up on MySpace. We needed a name to put as our profile name so just put what was the first thing that was said on TV, we switched it on and Ricky Gervais said "My Drinking – Does it offend you, yeah?" so we just went with that. No thought went into it whatsoever.

— synth player Dan Coop, NME.com interview

== Members ==
- James Rushent – lead vocals, bass guitar, synthesizer (2006–Present)
- Dan Coop – synthesizer (2006–Present)
- Matty Derham – guitar, backing vocals (2009–Present)

Former members

- Morgan Quaintance – guitar, synthesizer, backing vocals (2007–2009)
- Rob Bloomfield – drums, backing vocals (2006–2015)
- Chloe Duveaux – bass guitar, backing vocals (2009–2012)
- Steve 'Munky' Muncaster – Drummer, Babe (2021–2021)

Guest musicians

- Sebastien Grainger – lead vocals

== Discography ==
=== Albums ===
List of studio albums, with selected chart positions
Title	Album details	Peak chart positions			
Title	Album details	UK	UK Dance	UK Indie	SCO
You Have No Idea What You're Getting Yourself Into	Released: 24 March 2008; Label: Virgin, Startime, Almost Gold; Formats: CD, LP, digital download	48	—	—	80
Don't Say We Didn't Warn You	Released: 14 March 2011; Label: Cooking Vinyl; Formats: CD, LP, digital download	119	3	11	—
"—" denotes releases that did not chart or were not released in that territory.

=== EPs ===
- Live @ The Fez (2008) – Live digital download EP included with every pre-order of the album.
- iTunes Live: London Festival '08 (2008)
- iTunes – Live at Lollapalooza 2008: Does It Offend You, Yeah? EP

=== Singles ===
Title	Year	Peak chart positions		Album
Title	Year	UK	SCO	Album
"Weird Science"	2007	—	—	You Have No Idea What You're Getting Yourself Into
"Let's Make Out"	2007	—	—	You Have No Idea What You're Getting Yourself Into
"We Are Rockstars"	2008	177	—	You Have No Idea What You're Getting Yourself Into
"Dawn of the Dead"	2008	41	6	You Have No Idea What You're Getting Yourself Into
"Epic Last Song"	2008	91	20	You Have No Idea What You're Getting Yourself Into
"The Monkeys Are Coming"	2011	— (Note: "The Monkeys Are Coming" did not enter the UK Singles Chart, but peaked at number 12 on the UK Physical Singles Chart Top 100.)	—	Don't Say We Didn't Warn You
"Wondering"	2011	—	—	Don't Say We Didn't Warn You
"Pull Out My Insides"	2011	—	—	Don't Say We Didn't Warn You
"Guess Who Just Rolled Back Into Town"	2022	—	—	Non-album singles
"All the Same"	2022	—	—	Non-album singles
"—" denotes recording that did not chart or was not released

=== Remixes ===
- Bloc Party – "The Prayer" (Also featured on Need for Speed: ProStreet)(Wichita) Rushent / Coop
- Muse – "Map of the Problematique" (Warner Bros) Rushent / Coop
- 50 Cent – "Do You Think About Me" (Interscope) Bloomfield
- dan le sac vs Scroobius Pip – "Cauliflower" (Sunday Best) Bloomfield
- The Raconteurs – "Steady, As She Goes" (White) Rushent / Coop
- The White Stripes – "Fell in Love with a Girl" (White) Rushent / Coop
- Hadouken! – "Crank It Up" (Atlantic Records) Rushent
- The Faint – "The Geeks Were Right" (Saddle Creek) Bloomfield
- Air Traffic – "Charlotte" (Unreleased) Rushent
- Muse – "Uprising" (Warner Bros) Rushent
- Linkin Park – "The Catalyst" (Warner Bros) Bloomfield
- Natalia Kills – "Zombie" (Interscope) Bloomfield
- Escape The Fate – "Issues" (Interscope) Bloomfield
- The Naked and Famous – "Does Being Famous Offend Nudes (Punching in a Dream Remix)" Bloomfield
- Gavin James (singer) – The Book Of Love
- ok tokyo – You Better Believe It
- The Naked and Famous – Punching in a Dream

=== Covers ===
- "Whip It" originally by Devo – Played live and a live recording was included on the NME Awards 2008 souvenir CD which came free with every issue of the edition of 27 February 2008 of NME magazine.

=== Music videos ===
- "Weird Science" – 2007
- "Let's Make Out" – 2007
- "We Are Rockstars" – 2008
- "Epic Last Song" – 2008
- "Dawn of the Dead" – 2008
- "We Are the Dead" – 2010
- "The Monkeys Are Coming" – 2011
- "Pull Out My Insides" – 2011
