= Vienna Ditto =

UK musical group

- Origin: Oxford, England
- Genres: Trip hop, alternative rock
- Years active: 2008–present
- Label: Ubiquity Project
- Members: Hats Taylor, Nigel Firth
- Past members: Scott Lawrence
- Website: viennaditto.com

Vienna Ditto were a trip hop band from England who describe their music as 'voodoo sci-fi blues'. Formed in 2008, they have featured on BBC Radio One, Channel 4 and played at Glastonbury in 2009. Many of their songs are given as free use for video projects.

Hats Taylor has gone on to become HATS TM, gaining the support of 6 music with their debut solo work.

== History ==
Nigel Firth and Scott Lawrence were members of the 1990s indie dance band Riser, and went on to create the group One Dollar Peep Show. In 2008 they teamed with Hatty Taylor to create Vienna Ditto, at one stage appearing in The Hollyoaks Music Show, and also playing Glastonbury. In November 2009 they were guests at the BBC's Maida Vale studios, performing four tracks as part of the corporation's "Introducing..." format, sessions which can still be viewed via the official BBC website. The group described the Maida Vale sessions as only their fifth gig.

== YouTube association ==
The band's free use policy on many of their tracks saw their song "La Niña Blanca" uploaded on 18 October 2014 on a free source music channel, though it did not initially garner much attention, with less than 5000 views by April 2016. The track was later used as an opening theme by the YouTuber 'Dakota Hendrix', who also went by the title 'The Gender Terrorist'. On 17 May 2016 the YouTube channel LeafyIsHere released a parody video of the Gender Terrorist channel, which received over 3.7 million hits by December 2016. A follow-up video on 31 May 2016 received over 2.9 million views in the same time frame, with many commentators responding to the music and asking for the track's name. Consequently, views of the track on YouTube rose, and by the end of 2016 exceeded 62,000 views.

== Discography ==
=== EPs ===
- The Vienna Ditto E.P. (2011)
- Liar Liar (2013)
- Ugly (2013)
- Feeling Good / Opium Boys + The Gospel Session (2014)
- Ticks (2016)
- Busted Flush (2016)

=== Studio albums ===
- Circle (2015)
- Flat Earth (2020)

=== Singles ===
- "I Know His Blood" (2012)
- "Bells" / "Snowbound" (2012)
- "Feeling Good" / "Opium Boys" (2014)
