= The Twelves =

- Origin: Rio de Janeiro, Brazil
- Genres: House
- Years active: 2005–present
- Labels: Eye Industries
- Members: João Miguel; Luciano Oliveira

The Twelves is an electronic music production and DJing duo, made up of Brazilian musicians João Miguel and Luciano Oliveira. They are best known for their remixing of songs by artists ranging from M.I.A. and La Roux to Nirvana and The Beatles. Spin dubbed them one of "9 Unknown Bands to Watch at SXSW" in March 2009 and one of the "25 Must-Hear Artists at Coachella 2011". They appeared on the Essential Mix on 19 Dec 2009.

== Remixes ==
Year	Artist	Title
2008	Black Kids	I'm Not Gonna Teach Your Boyfriend How to Dance with You
2008	The Virgins	Rich Girls
2009	Metric	Help, I'm Alive
2009	La Roux	In For The Kill
2009	Daft Punk	Nightvision
2009	Fever Ray	Seven
2009	FHR/Database	Beaches and Friends
2010	Two Door Cinema Club	Something Good Can Work
2011	Black Strobe	Me and Madonna
2014	The Knocks	Comfortable
