= Walter Meego =

American band

- Origin: Chicago, Illinois / Los Angeles, California, United States
- Genres: Pop, Dance, Rock
- Years active: 2004–2011
- Labels: Sony Music Entertainment, Almost Gold Recordings, Brilliante Records
- Members: Justin Sconza (vocals, keyboards, guitar); Andrew Adzemovic (guitar, vocals); Colin Yarck (keyboards, drum machine, etc)
- Past members: Pat Pellegrini; Jarrett Spiegel

Walter Meego was an American electronic pop band based in Chicago, Illinois.

== History ==
Walter Meego was formed in 2004 by Justin Sconza (guitar, keyboards, and vocals), Pat Pellegrini, and Colin Yarck (production) in the basement of Pellegrini's house. Pellegrini left the band in 2005. Andrew Adzemovic joined the group in 2007 as a guitarist and vocalist. They released a series of EPs before their debut album "Voyager," which was released in May 2008. Their second album, Wondervalley, was released in November 2010, available as a free digital download on their website and for purchase via iTunes.

Several of the band's songs have been featured on TV shows and advertisements, including ABC's Ugly Betty and the Heineken "Beertender" ads which aired in 2008. Additionally, Justin Sconza's solo song, "Pretty Picture," was featured in the Cox Communications ad, "Pod," starting in the summer of 2008. The spot was produced by Jan Chen and Lane Nakamura.

On October 12, 2011, Walter Meego's end was officially announced via the group's Twitter account.

As of their final years, the members were based in Los Angeles, California.

== Discography ==
=== Studio albums ===
Voyager (Sony/Almost Gold Recordings, 2008) Wondervalley 2010

=== Extended Plays ===
Walter Meego EP (Self Released, 2005) Romantic EP (Brilliante Records, 2007) "Through a Keyhole Tour EP (Almost Gold Recordings, 2007)

=== Singles ===
"Usually" (Single - Self Released, 2005) "Hollywood / Through a Keyhole" (Double Single - Brilliante Records, 2006) "Through a Keyhole" (UK Only Single - Minds on Fire Records, 2007)

=== Compilations ===
Music for Robots Vol. 2 (2006) Insound.com SXSW 2007 (2007)

=== Other Releases ===
Make it High Mixtape (2006) [not pictured above]

== Related Projects ==
Paint by Numbers EP (Justin Sconza EP, 2006)
