= Pitchfork (website) =

American online music magazine

- Homepage on 16 December 2025
- Former name: Pitchfork Media
- Website type: Online music magazine
- Available in: English
- Founded: 1996; 30 years ago
- Country of origin: United States
- Owner: Condé Nast
- Creator: Ryan Schreiber
- Editor: Mano Sundaresan
- Website: pitchfork.com
- Commercial: Yes
- Registration: No
- Current status: Active

Pitchfork (formerly Pitchfork Media) is an American online music magazine founded in 1996 by Ryan Schreiber in Minneapolis. It originally covered alternative and independent music, and expanded to cover genres including pop, hip-hop and metal. Pitchfork is one of the most influential music publications to have emerged in the internet age.

In the 2000s, Pitchfork distinguished itself from print media through its unusual editorial style, frequent updates and coverage of emerging acts. It was praised as passionate, authentic and unique, but criticized as pretentious, mean-spirited and elitist, playing into stereotypes of the cynical hipster. It is credited with popularizing acts such as Arcade Fire, Broken Social Scene, Bon Iver and Sufjan Stevens. It awards scores based on a decimal scale; a perfect Pitchfork score given to an album on release is a significant event in music journalism, while negative reviews have ended careers.

Pitchfork relocated to Chicago in 1999 and Brooklyn, New York, in 2011. It expanded with projects including the annual Pitchfork Music Festival (launched in Chicago in 2006), the video site Pitchfork.tv (launched in 2008), the 2008 book The Pitchfork 500, and a print publication, The Pitchfork Review (published between 2013 and 2016). In later years, Pitchfork became less antagonistic and more professional in style, and began covering more mainstream music and issues of gender, race and identity. As of 2014, it was receiving around 6.2 million unique visitors every month.

The influence of Pitchfork declined in the 2010s with the growth of streaming and social media. In 2015, it was acquired by the mass media company Condé Nast and moved to One World Trade Center, Manhattan. The Pitchfork president, Chris Kaskie, left in 2017, followed by Schreiber in 2019. In 2024, Condé Nast announced plans to merge Pitchfork into the men's magazine GQ, resulting in layoffs and the closure of Pitchfork Music Festival. The merge drew criticism and triggered concern about the implications for music journalism. In 2026, Pitchfork moved to a subscription model.

== History ==
=== 1996–2003: early years ===
Pitchfork, initially known as Pitchfork Media, was created in 1996 by Ryan Schreiber, a high school graduate living in his parents' home in Victoria, Minnesota, when he was 19. Schreiber grew up listening to indie rock acts such as Fugazi, Jawbox and Guided by Voices. He was influenced by fanzine culture and had no previous writing experience. Schreiber initially named the website Turntable, but changed it after another website claimed the rights. The name Pitchfork was inspired by the tattoo on the assassin Tony Montana in the 1983 film Scarface. Schreiber chose it as it was concise and had "evilish overtones". The first review was of Pacer (1995) by the Amps, and the record store Insound was Pitchfork's first advertiser. Many of Pitchfork's early reviews were later deleted.

Early Pitchfork reviews focused on indie rock and were often critical. The Washington Post described them as "brutal" and "merciless", writing: "The site's stable of critics often seemed capricious, uninvested, sometimes spiteful, assigning low scores on a signature 10-point scale with punitive zeal." Schreiber said the site's early period "was about really laying into people who really deserved it", and defended the importance of honesty in arts criticism. He said he wanted "to be daring, to surprise people and catch them off guard". In 1999, Schreiber relocated Pitchfork to Chicago. Within it first three years, Pitchfork published more than 1,500 reviews.

Around the turn of the millennium, the American music press was dominated by monthly print magazines such as Rolling Stone, creating a gap in the market for faster-moving publications that emphasized new acts. Pitchfork could publish several articles a day, greatly outpacing print media, particularly in the US, which did not have weekly magazines such as the British NME. New technologies such as MP3, the iPod and the file-sharing service Napster created greater access to music, and music blogs became an important resource, creating further opportunity for Pitchfork. The contributors Mark Richardson and Eric Harvey said this was an important part of Pitchfork's early popularity, as music fans could share and listen to new music while reading daily updates.

In 2000, Pitchfork's 10.0/10.0 review of the highly anticipated Radiohead album Kid A, written by Brent DiCrescenzo, generated a surge in readership and was one of the first signs of Pitchfork becoming a major publication. One of the first Kid A reviews published, it attracted attention for its unusual style. Billboard described it as "extremely long-winded and brazenly unhinged from the journalistic form and temperament of the time". While it was widely mocked, it boosted Pitchfork's profile. Schreiber said he understood the review would attract ridicule, but "wanted Pitchfork to be daring and to surprise people". In 2001, Pitchfork had 30,000 daily readers.

=== 2004–2005: growing influence and professional growth ===
As of 2004, Pitchfork had eight full-time employees and about 50 freelance staff members, most of whom worked remotely and coordinated through phone and internet. Writers were unpaid for their first six months, after which they could earn $10 or $20 for a review or $40 for a feature. Following staff tensions about Schreiber's advertising income, Pitchfork started paying writers from their first articles at a slightly improved rate. The first full-time employee, Chris Kaskie, formerly of the satirical website The Onion, was hired to run business operations. He later became the president and co-owner. Pitchfork's first professional editor, Scott Plagenhoef, was hired shortly afterwards. Kaskie and Plagenhoef are credited for turning Pitchfork into a professional operation.

In 2004, Pitchfork published a positive review of the debut album by Arcade Fire, Funeral. The album became a bestseller and is cited as the first major example of Pitchfork's influence on independent music, attracting coverage of Pitchfork from outlets such as the Los Angeles Times. The contributor Jess Weiss said the review "changed everything". By 2005, Pitchfork was attracting around one million readers a month, with an annual revenue of around $5 million. That year, Schreiber said he was uninterested in selling Pitchfork: "It would change into the antithesis of the reason I started it. This is something I am so in love with—this is my entire adult life's work."

=== 2006–2010: expanding operations ===
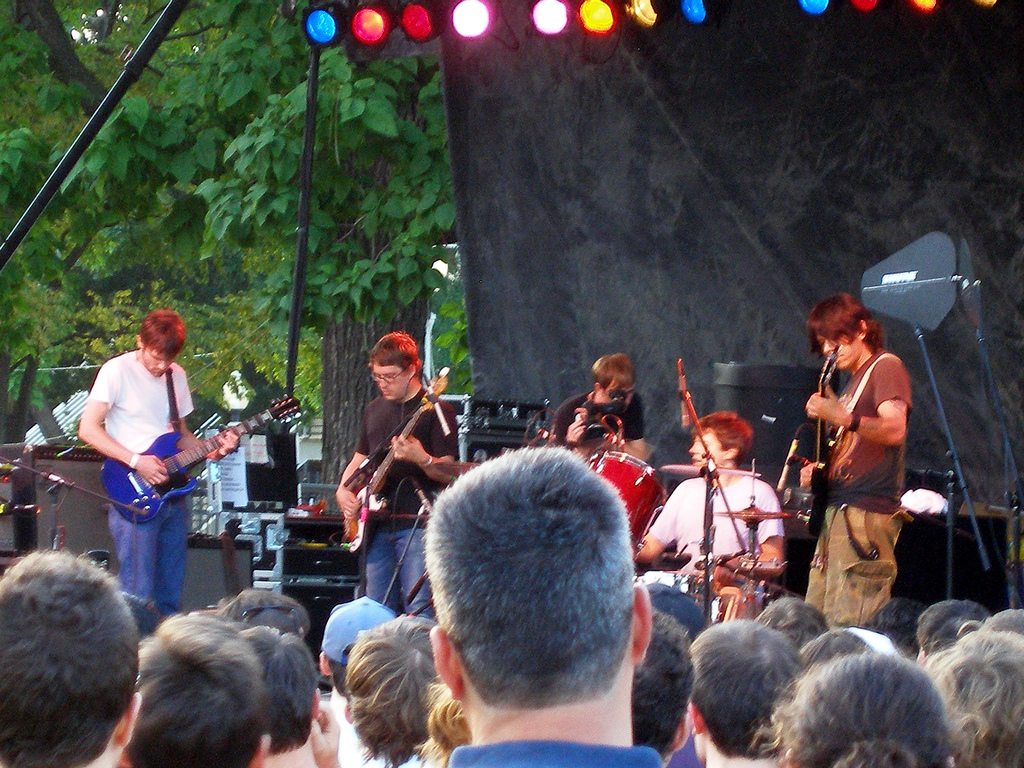
Slint at Pitchfork Music Festival 2007

By 2006, traditional music media, such as print magazines, music video channels and radio stations, had declined or changed focus, but listeners still sought a reliable source of recommendations. Without the limitations of print media, Pitchfork was able to champion emerging independent acts that major magazines, which had to sell millions of copies every year, could not. Schreiber felt the magazines were "not even trying to discover new music ... Publications used to take more chances on artists, putting bands on the cover that they thought deserved to be there." He said Pitchfork was able to take risks as it was not interested in appeasing bands, record labels or advertisers.

In 2006, Pitchfork had 170,000 daily readers and was publishing five album reviews a day, with six full-time employees. Schreiber said Pitchfork was able to sustain paid freelancers and eight employees, but was "always cutting it close". He attracted interest from investors but wanted to retain control and journalistic integrity was his priority. That August, several albums, including the forthcoming Joanna Newsom album Ys, leaked online after an internal Pitchfork server was hacked.

In the mid-2000s, Pitchfork expanded its operations. In 2005, it curated Intonation Music Festival in Union Park, Chicago. The following year, it launched the annual Pitchfork Music Festival. The first Paris Pitchfork Music Festival was held in 2011. Kaskie said it was exciting to see acts Pitchfork had championed playing to large crowds: "We start to see these bands playing in front of audiences 10 times the size of their biggest show ever. That's the goal, man. To put fucking Titus Andronicus in front of 10,000 people." In April 2008, after acquiring the live music show Juan's Basement, Pitchfork launched Pitchfork.tv, a website displaying interviews, music videos and feature-length films. In November, it published a book, The Pitchfork 500, covering the preceding 30 years of music.

By the end of the 2000s, Pitchfork had become influential in the music industry, credited for launching acts such as Arcade Fire and Bon Iver. Employees at record labels and record stores would use it to anticipate interest in acts. It was also attracting large sponsors such as American Express and Apple. In 2009, Pitchfork Media purchased the pitchfork.com URL from Livestock World, a seller of horses and cattle, and relaunched as Pitchfork.

=== 2010–2014: diversification, declining influence and sister publications ===
The influence of Pitchfork on music careers declined around the turn of the decade, as streaming and social media fractured audiences and reduced the need for gatekeepers. Streaming services began to fulfill Pitchfork's function of helping new artists find audiences, and independent music criticism moved to podcasts and YouTube. Declining music industry revenues reduced advertising spending, and Pitchfork faced competition from advertisers such as Facebook. According to August Brown of the Los Angeles Times, "The internet era that birthed Pitchfork's blend of saucy writing, outre tastes and massive popularity [was] by and large over." In The Atlantic, Spencer Kornhaber suggested that LCD Soundsystem's farewell show in Madison Square Garden in 2011 marked the end of the era in which indie rock bands feted by Pitchfork had cultural significance.

Over the following decade, Pitchfork shifted its editorial range and style. It began running news and features alongside reviews, coming to resemble a more conventional music publication. It also diversified from indie rock to cover mainstream music including pop, rap and metal, and began covering issues of gender, race and identity in music, influenced by movements such as poptimism, MeToo and Black Lives Matter. Schreiber said that "our tastes broadened with age and experience", and that Pitchfork could make a difference to social causes. Its reviews became less critical and its writers made fewer pitches for negative reviews, especially for artists with large fanbases. Schreiber had not wanted to cover the pop singer Taylor Swift, seeing her as out of Pitchfork's scope, but his colleagues disagreed. He later said Pitchfork had been suffering an "identity crisis".

In July 2010, Pitchfork launched Altered Zones, a blog aggregator devoted to underground and DIY music. In 2011, Pitchfork relocated to Brooklyn, New York. On May 21, Pitchfork announced a partnership with the website Kill Screen, in which Pitchfork would publish some of their articles. Altered Zones closed on November 30. On December 26, 2012, Pitchfork launched Nothing Major, a website that covered visual arts, which closed in October 2013. Pitchfork launched a film website, The Dissolve, in 2013. It closed in 2015, citing "financial challenges". In 2017, Kaskie said he remained proud of The Dissolve and that it was "a huge success from the creative and editorial, design and everything else".

In 2013, Pitchfork won the National Magazine Award for general excellence in digital media. That year, the rapper Chief Keef was arrested for violating a probation sentence by using a rifle in a promotional video by Pitchfork. Staff later described the episode as a low point and an example of how Pitchfork mishandled hip-hop artists. In December, Pitchfork launched The Pitchfork Review, a quarterly print journal focused on long-form music writing and design-focused content. Pitchfork planned a limited-edition quarterly publication of about 10,000 copies of each issue, printed on glossy, high-quality paper. About two thirds of the content would be original, with the remaining reused from the Pitchfork website. The International Business Times likened the literary aspirations to The New Yorker and the Paris Review. The Pitchfork Review ended after 11 issues in November 2016.

As of 2014, Pitchfork was receiving around 6.2 million unique visitors and 40 million pageviews every month, with an expected annual revenue growth of 25 to 40 percent. Its primary revenue came from advertising. According to the media analytics firm Comscore, Pitchfork had 2.47 million unique visitors that August, more than the websites for Spin or Vibe but fewer than Rolling Stone's 11 million. By this point, Pitchfork was facing mounting financial problems, and Kaskie spent the year searching for funding.

=== 2015–2016: acquisition by Condé Nast ===
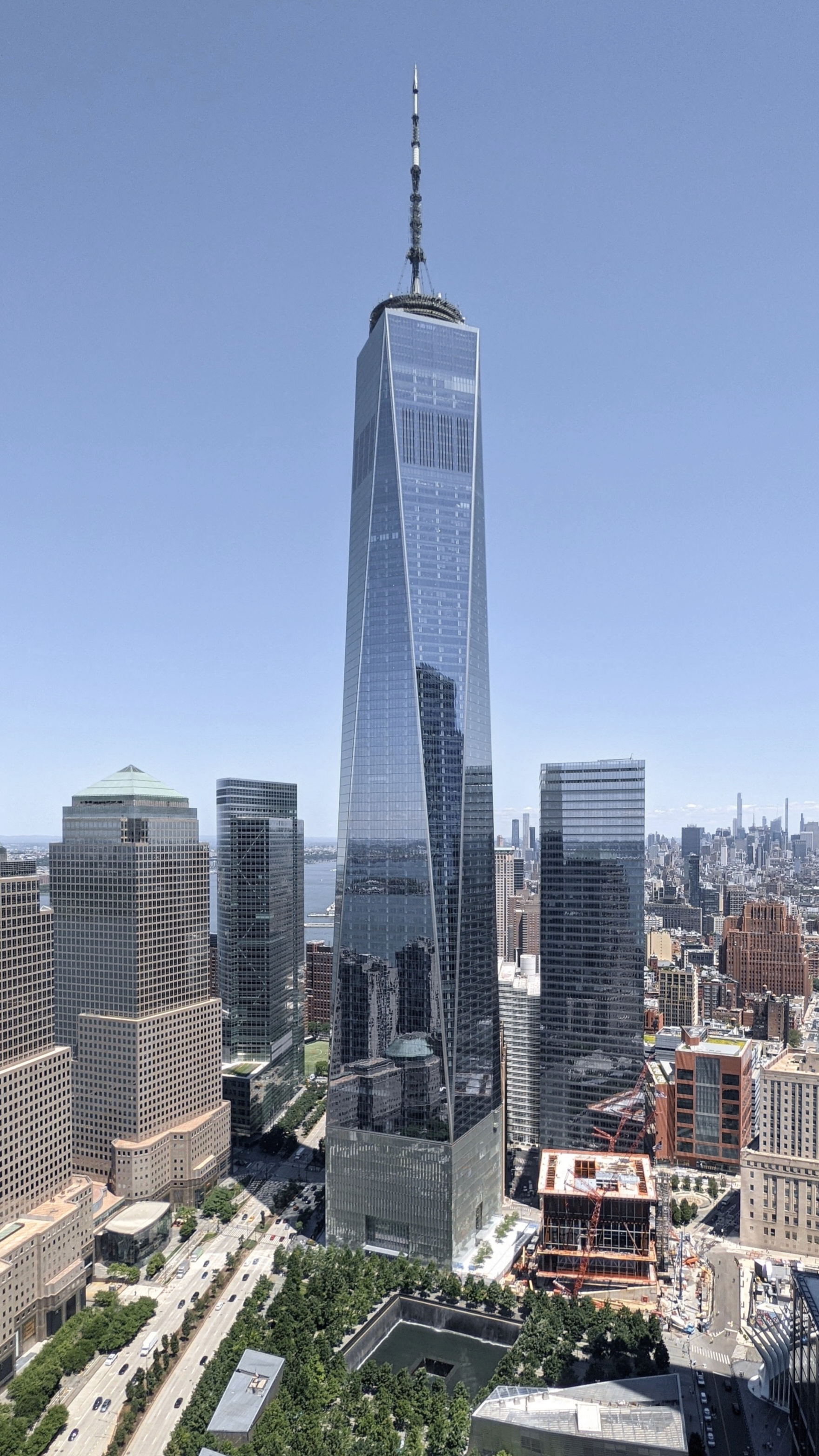
One World Trade Center, Manhattan, the site of Pitchfork's offices since 2015

On October 13, 2015, the American mass media company Condé Nast announced that it had acquired Pitchfork. At this point, Pitchfork had about 50 employees, with editorial and video production staff in Brooklyn and advertising, sales and development staff in Chicago. The Condé Nast CEO, Bob Sauerberg, described Pitchfork as a "distinguished digital property that brings a strong editorial voice, an enthusiastic and young audience, a growing video platform and a thriving events business". Kaskie said "our needs and wants were converging", and that Pitchfork needed capital and expertise to expand its publication and festivals. The sale boosted Pitchfork's value to advertisers.

Previously, Pitchfork's independence had been key to its image. Schreiber said it would continue to have "creative independence". The acquisition triggered concern; the New York Observer wrote that it was a "death knell for indie rock". The Condé Nast chief digital officer, Fred Santarpia, was criticized when he said the acquisition would bring "a very passionate audience of millennial males into our roster". The Atlantic connected the comment to a 2014 Nielsen report that found that millennial men were heavy music listeners and were more interested in streaming services than other demographics. 88% of respondents to a 2012 Pitchfork poll of readers' favorite music were male, and statistics recorded by Quantcast in 2015 found that 82% of Pitchfork readers were men, most aged 18–34. Responding to Santarpia's comment, Schreiber wrote on Twitter that Pitchfork aimed to reach "all music fans everywhere" and that women were a large part of its staff and readership.

Following the sale, Pitchfork relocated to the Condé Nast offices in One World Trade Center, Manhattan. On March 13, 2016, Pitchfork launched its first new design since 2011. With Schreiber aiming to create the world's best repository for music content, Pitchfork began creating videos and retrospective articles, covering classic albums released before its founding. As of October 2016, Pitchfork had 4.1 million unique visitors, up from 2.7 million the previous October.

=== 2017–2023: departures of Kaskie and Schreiber ===
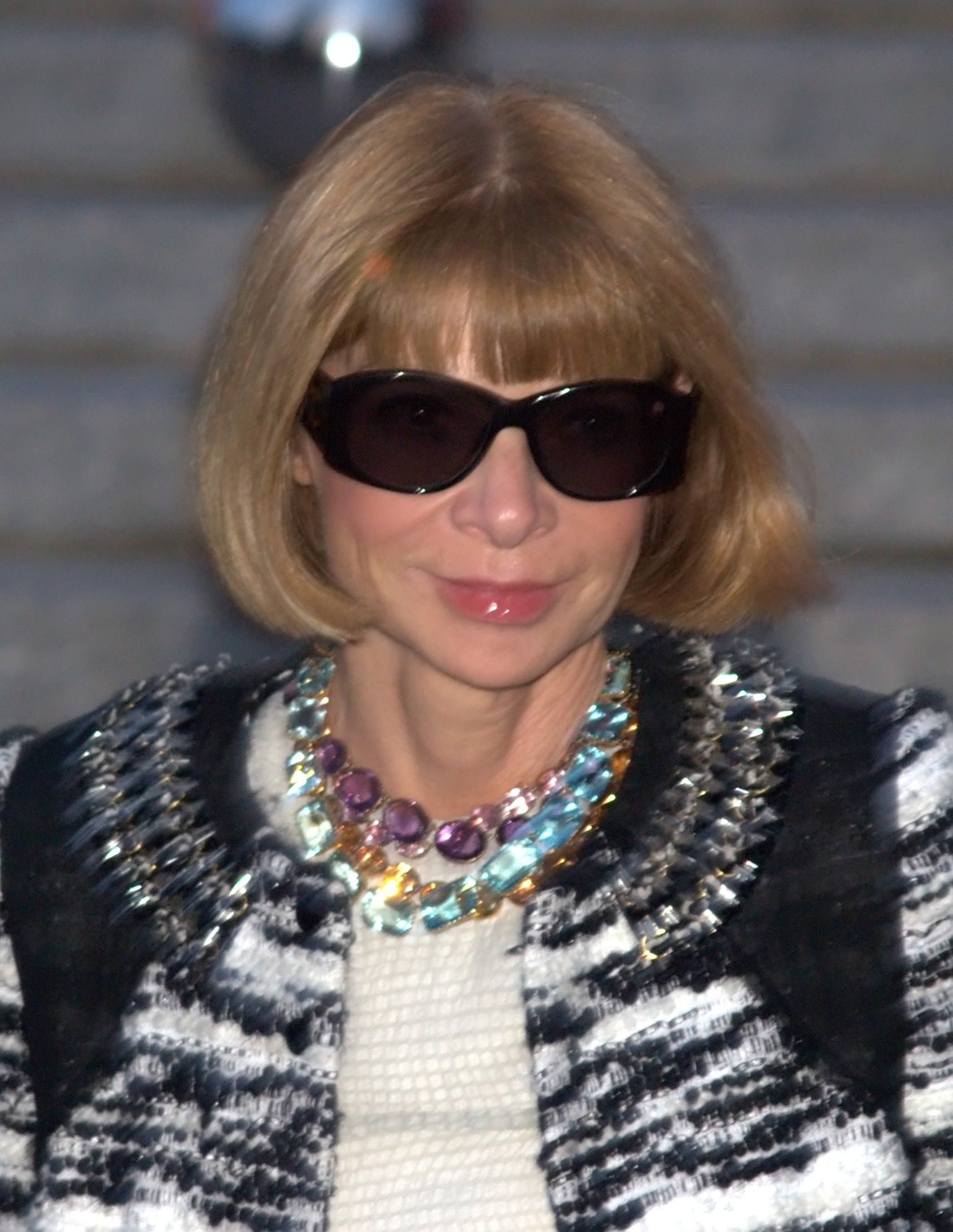
Anna Wintour, the Condé Nast chief content officer, in 2010

Kaskie announced his departure from Pitchfork in May 2017. He had been frustrated by his diminished role under Condé Nast and Pitchfork's reduced autonomy. On September 18, 2018, Schreiber stepped down as the top editor. He said later that Condé Nast had unrealistic expectations and did not understand Pitchfork. On October 15, he was replaced by Puja Patel, who had worked at Spin and Gawker Media. Schreiber remained as a strategic advisor.

Patel came under pressure to cut costs amid declining traffic from social media, and competition from streaming platforms, which offered a new means for listeners to discover music. Pitchfork staff conflicted with Condé Nast over its attempts to monetize Pitchfork Music Festival by making it into a "luxury" experience. Santarpia left Condé Nast in 2018, leaving Pitchfork under the purview of Anna Wintour, the chief content officer. Two former Pitchfork staffers told The Verge that Wintour did not care about music or understand the internet.

Schreiber announced his departure on January 8, 2019, saying he wanted to "keep pushing boundaries and exploring new things". The Los Angeles Times said the departure came at a time of "existential change" for the media industries, citing the rise of streaming services and social media and the downsizing of many major music publications. That month, Condé Nast announced it would put all its publications, including Pitchfork, behind a paywall by the end of the year. It abandoned experiments with Pitchfork paywalls following criticism from readers. In 2020, Condé Nast laid off the executive editor Matthew Schnipper and the features editor and union chair Stacey Anderson. In 2022 and 2023, Pitchfork had about three million unique visitors a month, down by about 36% from 2021.

=== 2024: merge into GQ and layoffs ===
On January 17, 2024, Wintour announced that Pitchfork would merge with the men's magazine GQ. Staff including Patel were laid off, leaving around a dozen editorial staff, including some working on multiple Condé Nast publications. Max Tani of Semafor reported that the remaining staff were "depressed and embarrassed" by the merge. One writer who was laid off, Andy Cush, said "there was this real sense of despair ... about ever having a place to do the kind of work you feel like you're good at and that you're interested in again". As of that month, Pitchfork had the most daily active users of any Condé Nast publication.

Journalists reacted with sadness and concern for the future of music journalism. Tani and The Washington Post's Chris Richards expressed disgust that Pitchfork, once independent and provocative, would be absorbed into an establishment men's magazine. The music critic Ann Powers wrote that the merge felt "like a highly conservative move at a time when music has proven to be one of our culture's most beautifully progressive spaces". Another critic, Amanda Petrusich, said it "feels like a death knell for the record review as a form".

The producer Dan le Sac, whose 2008 album Angles received a score of 0.2 from Pitchfork, said: "Pitchfork getting gutted is a net negative for musicians everywhere ... Whether you agree with a reviewer or not, music needs more journalism, not less." In The Guardian, Laura Snapes doubted that specialist music journalism could survive, writing that Pitchfork had provided a vital "leading example" and was one of the last stable employers of freelance music writers. Schreiber said that commentators were "premature to eulogize Pitchfork", as it retained a skeleton crew continuing its mission, and said he was pleased with the work it had published since the announcement.

On July 2, 2024, Pitchfork named Mano Sundaresan, the founder of the music blog No Bells, as the new head of editorial content. Sundaresan denied that Pitchfork was "going away", and said he aimed to adapt it to modern media and cater to more specialized audiences. That October, five former Pitchfork writers launched the music site Hearing Things, which aims to "capture the original independent spirit" of Pitchfork. In November, Pitchfork announced that it had canceled Pitchfork Music Festival but would continue to produce events and "create spaces where music, culture, and community intersect".

On 20 January 2026, Pitchfork announced that it was moving to a subscription model; for $5 a month, readers can add comments and scores to reviews and access archived reviews. Sundaresan wrote that "music and music criticism are inherently social" and hoped the change would "deepen our readers' connection to music and each other". In July, Pitchfork sued the co-founder of Pitchfork Music Festival, alleging he had misappropriated $564,000 in festival funds.

== Style ==
In the 2000s, Pitchfork's unusual, passionate and stylized reviews differentiated it from the more scholarly and formal style of print magazines such as Rolling Stone. The critic Steven Hyden said it offered an alternative to music magazines at the end of the 20th century, which were publishing content about Star Wars, nu metal and pop punk. He characterized the Pitchfork voice as that of the outsider mocking the mainstream. In The Verge, Elizabeth Lopatto wrote that early reviews were brash, unprofessional and often bizarre, but that this distinguished Pitchfork from traditional media and made it fun to read. Pitchfork contributors said it was immediately divisive among music fans.

In the Washington Post, J. Freedom du Lac described Pitchfork as entertaining, "hilariously snarky" and "occasionally even enlightening". The Los Angeles Times writer August Brown described it as "raucous, passionate, sometimes blinkered but always evolving". In Slate, Matthew Shaer wrote that the best Pitchfork reviews were "cagey, fierce, witty and graceful". The journalist Dave Itzkoff described Pitchfork reviews as "defiantly passionate and frustratingly capricious" with an "aura of integrity and authenticity that made such pronouncements credible, even definitive, to fans ... insinuating themselves into the grand tradition of rock criticism, joining the ranks of imperious and opinionated writers". Schreiber described the reviews of one early Pitchfork writer, Brent DiCrescenzo, as dense with dialogue and pop culture references, "exploring outlandish scenarios".

Pitchfork's style changed in the 2010s as it broadened its scope and audience, shifting to poptimism. The contributor Craig Jenkins said Pitchfork had needed to change its "walled-in" perspective, and that it had been "antagonistic toward the stuff that the average person would be appreciating". Plagenhoef felt that the inflammatory "stunt reviews" were limiting, and wanted Pitchfork to be seen as trustworthy and thoughtful. Snapes said some had lamented the change, suggesting that it made Pitchfork "a less specific proposition". However, she felt it reflected modern music consumption and found it heartening that Pitchfork was reviewing a variety of genres and artists. Under Puja Patel, who became the editor in 2018, Pitchfork covered more female, non-binary, queer and non-white artists.

Pitchfork also switched to a more professional style. The editor Amy Phillips illustrated this by comparing her coverage of two Radiohead album announcements, years apart; the first was excitable, whereas the second was more professional and factual. In 2014, the contributor Nate Patrin said Pitchfork had become "what publications like the Village Voice used to be in terms of letting writers go deep without feeling pressured to talk down to readers", with long-form articles and documentaries. By 2017, according to Bloomberg, its reviews had become "as erudite as those of the music magazines that Pitchfork had all but eclipsed in influence".

In 2024, the critic Ann Powers wrote that Pitchfork had "nurtured many of the best and most influential writers working today". She felt that "great music writing messes with productivity by creating a space to slow down and really immerse in someone else's creative work ... The best writing at Pitchfork or anywhere reflects that process and is as variegated as the human experience itself." In 2015, The Guardian credited Pitchfork for pioneering design techniques that combined print design and technical innovation to create the impression of a "forward-facing, vibrant title".

== Review system ==
By 2021, Pitchfork had published more than 28,000 reviews. Its reviews do not represent an editorial consensus but the opinion of the individual reviewer. Writers who did not want to use their names, or failed to include bylines with their submissions, are credited as Ray Suzuki, similarly to the filmmaker pseudonym Alan Smithee.

Unlike other music publications, which typically assign scores out of five or ten, Pitchfork uses a decimal scale of 0.0 to 10.0. The system has drawn mockery as arbitrary and overprecise. In The Ringer, Rob Harvilla wrote of the "maddening and theoretically precise approach to decimal places, such that an ocean of feeling separates an 8.1 from an 8.9". DiCrescenzo described it as "knowingly silly", and in 2021 Pitchfork wrote that it was an "admittedly absurd and subjective" signature element. Schreiber said he liked its absurdity and how "it felt kind of scientific without any actual science to it". Early reviews used percentages rather than decimals.

Pitchfork has awarded perfect scores to more than 50 albums, most of them in its "Sunday Reviews" feature, which publishes retrospective reviews of classic albums. Artists whose albums have received perfect scores on release include Radiohead, Fiona Apple, Kanye West, Bonnie "Prince" Billy, And You Will Know Us by the Trail of Dead and Wilco. According to Harvilla, a perfect score given to an album on release "qualifies as a seismic event for the rock-critic universe as a whole" and "carries all the historical weight of five stars in Rolling Stone or five mics in The Source".

Some reviews experimented with the score system. The 2005 Robert Pollard album Relaxation of the Asshole received a simultaneous 10 and 0; the review of the 2007 Radiohead album In Rainbows, which allowed fans to pay what they wanted to download, allowed readers to enter their own score. After Pitchfork changed its content management system to require a number, these albums were given fixed scores.

== Criticism ==
=== Prose ===
In the 2000s, Pitchfork reviews were criticized as pretentious, verbose and inaccurate. Itzkoff wrote that Pitchfork was overwrought and sometimes hard to understand, with an abundance of adjectives, adverbs and misused words. Shaer identified examples of "verbose and unreadable writing ... dense without being insightful, personal without being interesting". In City Pages, Lindsey Thomas wrote that its prose was florid and sometimes impenetrable, and contained factual errors. Similar criticisms came from Rob Harvilla of the East Bay Express and Claire Suddath of Time. Responding to criticism in 2006, Schreiber said he trusted his writers' style and opinions.

=== Elitism ===
In its early years, Pitchfork was criticized as mean-spirited and elitist and for publishing reviews that did not meaningfully discuss the music, playing into stereotypes of the cynical hipster. In 2018, the music journalist Robert Christgau described the early years of Pitchfork as "a snotty boys' club open to many 'critics' ... Too many amateur wise-asses and self-appointed aesthetes throwing their weight around."

Many scathing early reviews were by Brent DiCrescenzo, who wrote lengthy reviews that rarely addressed the music. For example, his critical review of the 2001 Tool album Lateralus included a lengthy list of equipment used by the drummer, Danny Carey. Some Pitchfork reviews consist only of single images or videos, implying the record is beneath critical analysis. Shaer wrote in 2006 that Pitchfork typically triumphed acts it had "discovered" and attacked beloved legacy acts and bands popular on music blogs. Some believed that Pitchfork deliberately waited for excitement to build around an act before dismissing it with a critical review.

Itzkoff argued that the obtuse and confrontational style was part of the Pitchfork business model and made their reviews memorable. He suggested that the writers' lack of training or experience, and the fact that they worked for low or no pay, created a sense of authenticity and undermined the authority of traditional media. Schreiber conceded that Pitchfork had a reputation for snobbery, but said its writers were "really just honest, opinionated music fans".

=== Race and gender ===
In the 2000s, Pitchfork was criticized for focusing on music made by white men, which reflected its staff. Some accused Pitchfork of rockism, a bias in favor of rock music. In 2007, the rapper M.I.A. criticized Pitchfork for assuming that her album Kala had been produced entirely by the male producer Diplo. Another Pitchfork writer described the error as "perpetuating the male-led ingenue myth". M.I.A. and the singer Björk argued that this was part of a wider problem of journalists assuming that female artists do not write or produce their own music. In 2024, the Pitchfork contributor Andrew Nosnitsky argued that hip-hop, not indie rock, was the "defining music" of his generation, but that Pitchfork was viewed as the defining music publication for "purely mechanical and straight-up white-supremacy reasons".

=== Parodies ===
Pitchfork has attracted multiple parodies. In 2005, Pitchfork invited the comedian David Cross to write a list of his favorite albums. Cross was surprised by the invitation, citing several insulting Pitchfork reviews of his comedy albums, and instead wrote a "withering and absurdist" article titled "Albums to listen to while reading overwrought Pitchfork reviews". In 2007, the satirical website The Onion published a story in which Pitchfork reviewed music as a whole and gave it a score of 6.8. The music blog Idolator ran a feature asking readers to guess which lines came from Pitchfork reviews and which were fabricated. In 2010, the writer David Shapiro started a Tumblr blog, "Pitchfork Reviews Reviews", which reviewed Pitchfork reviews and assessed their arguments. It attracted more than 100,000 followers and a profile in the New York Times.

== Influence ==
Spencer Kornhaber of the Atlantic described Pitchfork as the most influential music publication to emerge in the internet age. In the 2000s, it was credited with "making or breaking" musical careers, a phenomenon known as the "Pitchfork effect". Plagenhoef downplayed its influence, saying it merely "accelerated the process".

Itzkoff, a former editor for Spin, described the Spin staff checking Pitchfork regularly: "If it was lavishing attention on a new band, we at least had to ask ourselves why we weren't doing the same: by then, our value as a trustworthy and consistent filter had waned." The online magazine Consequence of Sound emulated Pitchfork early on, "especially as it came to creating an editorial voice, developing a consistent content strategy, and packaging a love of music in a compelling way", according to its founder, Alex Young.

=== Positive ===
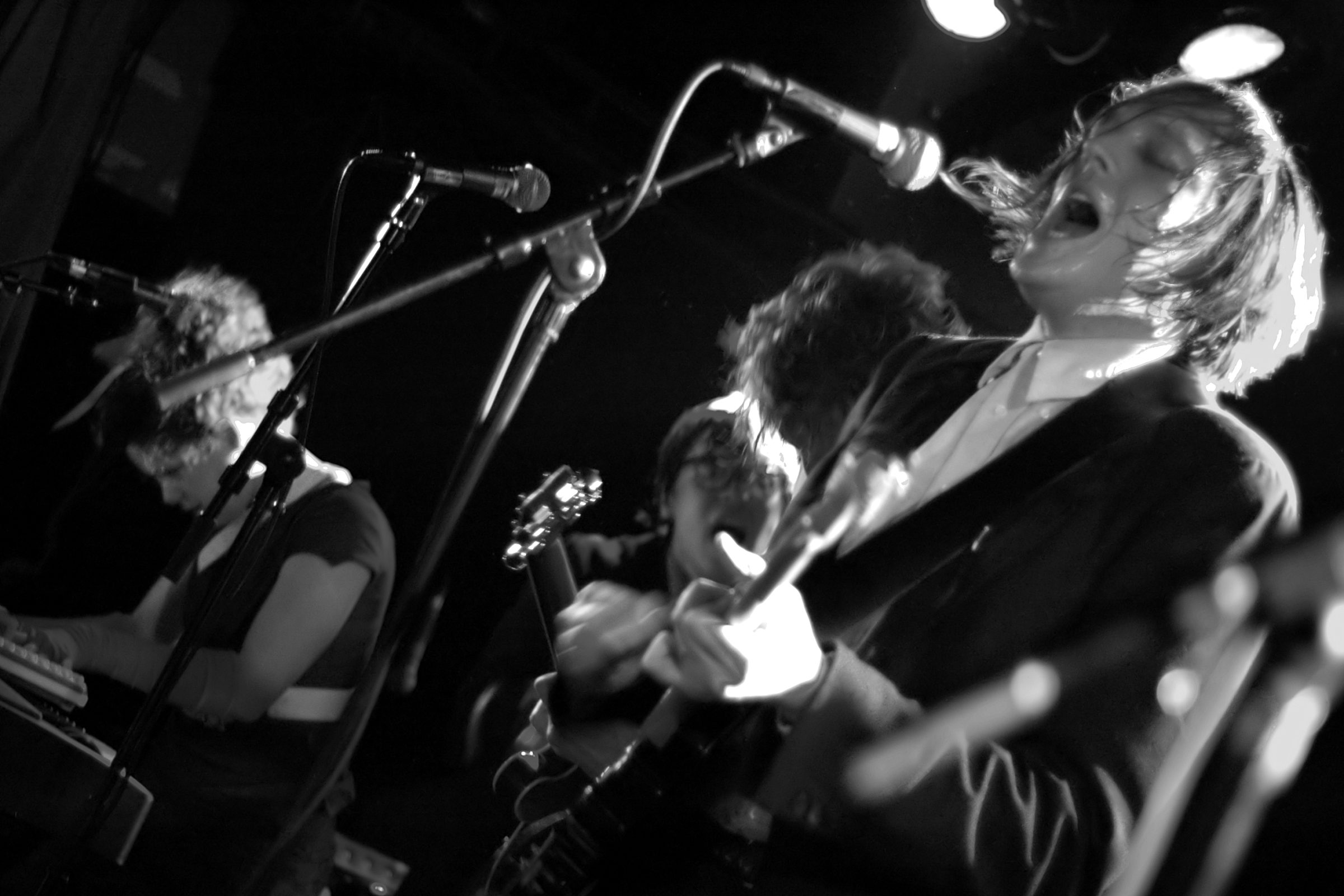
Pitchfork is credited for launching the careers of indie rock bands such as Arcade Fire (pictured in 2005).

The critic Carl Wilson said Pitchfork drove a "feeding frenzy about band discovery" in North American music journalism, with publications vying to discover new acts. In 2006, the Washington Post described Schreiber as an "indie-rock kingmaker" and wrote that "an endorsement from Pitchfork ... is very valuable, indeed". Megan Jasper, the CEO of the record label Sub Pop, said favorable Pitchfork reviews would boost sales and that it became normal for indie rock bands to sell 100,000 records, exceeding expectations. Poorly reviewed albums made no impact.

After Pitchfork awarded 9.7 to the debut album by Arcade Fire, Funeral (2004), it became the fastest-selling record in the history of Merge Records. Other acts whose careers were boosted by Pitchfork in the 2000s include the Dismemberment Plan, Clap Your Hands Say Yeah, Modest Mouse, Broken Social Scene, Bon Iver and Sufjan Stevens. Schreiber said they wanted to create a roster of artists whom people discovered through and associated with Pitchfork.

=== Negative ===
After Pitchfork awarded 0.0 to Travistan (2004), the debut solo album by the Dismemberment Plan singer Travis Morrison, his solo career effectively ended. Years later, Morrison described the experience as "frightening and awful". Schreiber said he felt bad for him, but that it was important for Pitchfork writers to be honest. Other albums to receive 0.0 include Zaireeka (1995) by the Flaming Lips, NYC Ghosts & Flowers (2000) by Sonic Youth, Liz Phair (2003) by Liz Phair and Shine On (2006) by Jet. The Jet review consisted entirely of a video of a chimp urinating into its own mouth and was widely shared. The authors of the Phair and Sonic Youth reviews later changed their opinions and apologized to the artists.

In Slate, Amos Barshad cited the band Black Kids as the most infamous example of Pitchfork "at its most deleterious". The Black Kids were boosted by Pitchfork's positive review of their debut EP, Wizard of Ahhhs (2007). However, their career collapsed when Pitchfork gave their debut album, Partie Traumatic (2008), a score of 3.3, with a review consisting entirely of a photograph of two frowning dogs and a frowning emoticon. Plagenhoef said Pitchfork later became more cautious in publishing negative reviews, as they were no longer "little guys on the internet throwing rocks at big artists". In August 2026, Pitchfork gave 0.0 to Starface by Tyga, criticizing its use of AI. It was the first 0.0 rating since Pitchfork reviewed the indie compilation album This Is Next in 2007.

=== Decline ===
The influence of Pitchfork on musical careers declined with the onset of streaming and social media in the 2010s. In 2017, a senior editor for independent music at the streaming platform Spotify said that Pitchfork no longer had the same influence. However, according to Tani, "Even as its Gen-X and old millennial fans aged and tastemaking shifted to platforms and influencers, Pitchfork remained the premier publication for music criticism, its year-end lists synonymous with critical acclaim."
