= Almost Gold Recordings =

American independent record label

- Founded: 2007
- Founder: Scott Rodger, Clare Britt
- Distributor(s): Universal Music Group
- Genre: Alternative
- Country of origin: United States
- Location: New York City; London
- Official website: almostgoldrecordings.com

Almost Gold Recordings is an independent record label. It was founded in 2007 in New York City by Scott Rodger of Quest Management with distribution in North America through Columbia Records. The first release on Almost Gold was the Peter Bjorn and John album Writer's Block, on February 6, 2007. Almost Gold is now fully independent in North America having severed ties with Columbia Records.

Almost Gold Recordings is a partnership between Scott Rodger and Clare Britt (formerly of Rough Trade and Island Records), with distribution Worldwide through Mercury Records. The first release on Almost Gold in the UK and internationally was Black Kids' debut album Partie Traumatic in July 2008. Other notable acts include Calvin Harris and Does It Offend You, Yeah?

== Artists ==
=== North America ===
- Calvin Harris
- Does It Offend You, Yeah?
- Peter Bjorn and John
- Shugo Tokumaru
- Walter Meego
- Wild Light

=== UK ===
- Black Kids
- Harlem Shakes

== See also ==
- List of record labels
