= Saint-Germain-des-Prés Café =

Compilation album series

Cover of the first volume of the series

Saint-Germain-des-Prés Café is a series of nu-jazz compilations distributed by Wagram Music. Its name evokes the cafés of the area in Paris associated with the existentialism movement. As of 2016 the series includes eighteen volumes, and has sold more than 950,000 copies worldwide.

== Volume 1 ==
Saint-Germain-des-Prés Café, Volume 1

Compilation album by Various Artists
- Released: October 30, 2001
- Genre: Nu jazz, lounge
- Length: 77:55
- Label: Wagram Records

1. Durán y García – "'Round Midnight" – 5:10
2. Vert – "Original Oddstep (Revised by Grand Unified)" – 5:30
3. Jazzanova – "Coffee Talk (Yukihiro Fukutomi Remix)" – 8:05
4. South Froggies featuring Allan – "Jazzion" – 4:40
5. Barrio Jazz Gang – "Chok-a-Blok Avenue (Nu-Jazz Wilde-Stereo Summer Mix)" – 5:23
6. Taxi – "Yes It's True" – 4:22
7. Rubin Steiner – "Lo-Fi Nu Jazz #13" – 4:01
8. De-Phazz – "Godsdog" – 3:14
9. Megashira – "At Last" – 5:16
10. Ian Simmonds – "Theme to the Last Puma" – 4:59
11. Jet Set Productions feat. Jo Laundy – "Style" – 5:38
12. Bugge Wesseltoft – "G.U.B.N.U.F." – 7:13
13. Funk 4 Sale – "Ocean Games" – 3:41
14. St. Germain – "Deep in It" – 7:13
15. Grand Tourism feat. Terry Callier – "Courants d'air" – 3:32

=== Credits ===
- Tracklisting & Realisation – Olivier Delachanal & Fabien Barrau
- Mastered by Fabrice Delaveau
- Artwork – Hotspot

== Volume 2 ==
Saint-Germain-des-Prés Café, Volume 2

Compilation album by Various Artists
- Released: July 23, 2002
- Genre: House, lounge
- Length: 77:46
- Label: Wagram Records

Professional ratings
Review scores
Source	Rating
AllMusic	3/5 stars

1. Pink Satellite – "Saint-Germain-des-Prés" – 4:49
2. Klément Julienne – "Possoz Boogie" – 4:31
3. Zero db – "The Snare" – 5:17
4. The Duncan – "Too Deep" – 4:33
5. Herbie Hancock feat. Chaka Khan – "The Essence" – 4:47
6. Beady Belle – "Game" – 4:26
7. David Grumel feat. Billie Holiday – "D'Jazz Tribute" – 3:19
8. Koop feat. Yukimi Nagano – "Summer Sun (Original Version)" – 3:44
9. Mo' Horizons – "Hit the Road Jack (Pé na Éstrada)" – 5:39
10. Humble Souls – "Beads, Things & Flowers (Instrumental Version]" – 4:04
11. Kenny Dope – "Mr. Dope" – 3:00
12. Kaori – "Good Life" – 3:18
13. Mark de Clive-Lowe feat. Cherie Mathieson – "Move On Up (Bugz Opaque Remix)" – 5:33
14. Durán y García – "Heavy Piano" – 4:00
15. Kevin Yost – "5 Alive" – 4:48
16. Gorodisch – "Strangest Feeling" – 2:52
17. Bugge Wesseltoft – "Change" – 5:05
18. Ashley Slater – "Private Sunshine (Big Lounge Album Mix by Carmen Rizzo)" – 3:54

== Volume 3 ==
Saint-Germain-des-Prés Café, Volume 3

Compilation album by Various Artists
- Released: February 4, 2003
- Genre: House, lounge, nu jazz
- Length: 77:57
- Label: Wagram Records

1. Nuspirit Helsinki – "Trying (Butti 49 Nu-Níveau Mix)" – 5:58
2. Trüby Trio feat. Joseph Malik – "High Jazz (Nicola Conte Remix)" – 6:25
3. Infracom presents [re:jazz] – "Quiet Night (Nicola Conte "Out of the Cool" Version)" – 4:58
4. Big Bang – "Ping Pong" – 5:40
5. Crusho – "Kool Bavaria (Patchworks Remix)" – 5:55
6. Eric Pierre feat. Lady Gattica – "Channel Zero (Shades of Soul Remix)" – 5:07
7. Patchworks – "Summertime" – 4:47
8. DJ Cam – "Un été à Paris" – 4:21
9. Briskey – "Conchita's Cabine" – 4:32
10. Variety Lab – "R. Bvor" – 3:53
11. Llorca – "The Novel Sound" – 6:54
12. Hardkandy – "Moonlight (Remix)" – 4:28
13. Fertile Ground – "Take Me Higher" – 4:31
14. De-Phazz – "Downtown Tazacorte" – 2:27
15. Projections – "Half Pint" – 1:08
16. 4 Hero aka TEK 9 – "We're Gettin' Down" – 4:35
17. Moloko – "Sing It Back (Can 7 1930's Mix)" – 2:09

== Volume 4 ==
Saint-Germain-des-Prés Café, Volume 4

Compilation album by Various Artists
- Released: January 27, 2004
- Genre: House, lounge, nu jazz
- Length: No Track Times Given
- Label: Wagram Records

1. Slow Train Soul – "Naturally" – 5:29
2. Nathan Haines – "Squire for Hire" – 3:33
3. U.F.O. & Dee Dee Bridgewater – "Flying Saucer" – 4:35
4. Nicola Conte – "Fuoco Fatuo" – 4:07
5. Metropolitan Jazz Affair – "Yunowhathislifeez (Jazz Mix)" – 3:33
6. Paul Hunter – "Frontlines" – 2:58
7. Koop – "Tonight (Nicola Conte New Jazz Version)" – 6:12
8. Lunar Chipmunk – "Equal" – 3:20
9. New Cool Collective – "Q Baiano" – 2:43
10. Infracom – "Swoundosophy" – 3:56
11. Beady Belle – "When My Angers Starts to Cry" – 3:44
12. Kruder & Dorfmeister – "High Noon" – 5:59
13. Matthew Herbert – "Suddenly" – 5:32
14. Loopless – "Red Thing Called Love" – 5:35
15. Bobby Hughes Combination – "Nattergalen" – 5:55
16. Briskey – "Galactic Jack (Buscemi's Beat to Beatnik Remix)" – 3:38
17. Nicolette – "No Government" – 2:00
18. Shaun Escoffery – "Breaking Away (Koop Remix)" – 3:21
19. Modern Jazz Quartet – "Round About Midnight" – 1:08

== Volume 5 ==
Saint-Germain-des-Prés Café, Volume 5

Compilation album by Various Artists
- Released: October 26, 2004
- Genre: Nu jazz, house, lounge
- Label: Wagram Records

1. Slow Train Soul – "Inna City Woman (Varano Remix)"
2. Marco di Marco feat. Nathan Haines – "Take Off (Nicola Conte "Campi's Idea" Version)"
3. Soulstance feat. Arthur Miles – "Time"
4. De-Phazz – "Cut the Jazz"
5. Norah Jones feat. Peter Malick – "New York City (DJ Strobe Brooklyn Vibe Mix feat. Split-Vizions)"
6. Refractory – "Yo solo quiero"
7. Stacey Kent feat. Jan Lundgren Trio – "Street of Dreams"
8. David Borsu feat. Damia da Costa – "Late Nite Swing"
9. Patchworks presents Dapper Ray – "Deep Ocean"
10. Elsa Hedberg – "Open the Door"
11. Ástor Piazzolla vs. Koop – "Vuelvo al sur"
12. Brisa Roché – "I Hear Music"
13. Meitz – "Can You Live"
14. Eli Goulart & Banda do Mo Mato – "Meu Sambo (Nicola Conte's Bossa Ahead Remix)"
15. dZihan & Kamien – "Stiff Jazz"
16. Gotan Project meets Chet Baker – "Round About Midnight"
17. Malia feat. Erik Truffaz – "Yellow Daffodils"
18. DJ Cam feat. Tassel & Naturel – "So What (Part 2)"

== Volume 6 ==
Saint-Germain-des-Prés Café, Volume 6

Compilation album by Various Artists
- Released: May 31, 2005
- Genre: House, lounge, nu jazz
- Label: Wagram Records

1. Jamie Cullum – "Devil May Care"
2. Doctor Abstract – "Struck On Jazz"
3. Mr Scruff – "Get a Move On"
4. TM Juke – "Playground Games (Diesler Mix)"
5. The Mighty Bop – "Feeling Good"
6. [re:jazz] feat. Lisa Bassenge – "All I Need"
7. Povo feat. Ed Thigpen – "Good & Bad"
8. Horne Singers – "Flat Foot"
9. Benny Sings – "Get There"
10. Was-a-Bee – "This Is What You Are"
11. Eddie Roberts – "Roughneck"
12. Skalpel – "1958"
13. Minigroove Orchestra – "La Monostéréologie (Riding Giant Mix)"
14. Hird – "Keep You Kimi"
15. Stacey Kent – "In the Still of the Night"
16. Madeleine Peyroux & William Galison – "Back in Your Own Back Yard"
17. Two Banks of Four – "One Day (Song for Jared)"
18. DJ Cam feat. Tassel & Naturel – "Cantaloop Island"

== Volume 7 ==
Saint-Germain-des-Prés Café, Volume 7

Compilation album by Various Artists
- Released: November 22, 2005
- Genre: House, lounge, nu jazz
- Label: Wagram Records

Disk one

1. Paolo Fedreghini & Marco Blanchi – "Oriental Smile"
2. Metropolitan Jazz Affair – "Escapism"
3. The Quantic Soul Orchestra feat. Alice Russell – "Feeling Good"
4. Sicania Soul feat. Lara Luppi – "Life Is a Tree (Live – Take 2)"
5. Michael Bublé – "Peroxide Swing"
6. The Five Corners Quintet feat. Mark Murphy – "This Could Be the Start of Something"
7. Jamie Cullum – "It Ain't Necessarily So"
8. Povo – "Uam Uam"
9. Rhythm Factory – "African Rhythm (A Touch of Jazz Mix)"
10. Nick Holder – "Sometimes I'm Blue"
11. Tosca – "Pyjama"
12. Abdullah Ibrahim – "Ishmaël (Stephan Rogall Remix)"
13. Kyle Eastwood – "Big Noise (from Winnetka)"
14. Kinny & Horne - "Sacred Life"
15. Electro Deluxe feat. Cynthia Saint-Ville – "Mister Freeze"
16. Sarah Vaughan – "Lover Man (Jazzelicious Remix)"
17. Beat Assailant – "Hard Twelve (The Payout)"

Disk two – Ladies in Nu Jazz

1. Beady Belle – "Goldilocks"
2. Tok Tok Tok feat. Tokundo Akinro – "About"
3. Muriel Zoe – "Bye Bye Blackbird"
4. Sonia Cat-Berro – "Let Yourself Go/Puttin' on the Ritz"
5. Fertile Ground feat. Navasha Daya – "Yellow Daisies"
6. Jeanette Lindstrom – "Here"
7. [re:jazz] feat. Ultra Naté – "Twisted"
8. Susi Hyldgaard – "Blush"
9. Alice Russell – "To Know This"
10. Norah Jones & Joel Harrison – "Tennessee Waltz"

== Volume 8 ==
Saint-Germain-des-Prés Café, Volume 8

Compilation album by Various Artists
- Released: November 13, 2005
- Genre: House, lounge, nu jazz
- Length: 2:04:50
- Label: Wagram Records

Disc one

1. Ashley Slater – "Cellophane"
2. Big Bang – "Yo Yo Jazz"
3. Diesler feat. Laura Vane – "Little Something"
4. Gerardo Frisina – "Gods of the Yoruba (Belem)"
5. [re:jazz] feat.Onejiru – "Push Push"
6. Kevin Yost – "What Is Cool"
7. Koop – "I See a Different You"
8. Matthias Vogt feat. Dania König – "Expecting Repercussions"
9. S-Tone Inc. – "Dreamer"
10. Jumbotronics – "Sandy"
11. Povo feat. Trine-Lise Væring – "Million Ways"
12. Alice Russell feat. Nature Boy – "Sweet Is in the Air"
13. Kinny & Horne – "Forgetting to Remember (Nostalgia 77 Mix)"
14. The Dining Rooms – "Thin Ice (Paolo Fedreghini & Marco Bianchi Remix)"
15. Painted Pictures – "Sweet Melody"
16. Beat Assailant feat. Tash – "Chronik Break"

Disc two – French in Nu Jazz

1. Alif Tree – "Forgotten Places"
2. Metropolitan Jazz Affair – "Drifting (Swing Mix)"
3. Benjamin Dévigne – "Ocre"
4. Rongetz Foundation – "Almost"
5. Bang-Bang feat. Athena Constantine – "Murmur"
6. Stephane Belmondo, Nutropic – "We've Got It!"
7. JMDee-Beat feat. Tassel & Naturel – "A Fool Like Me"
8. Uptown Funk Empire – "I Am a Manchild"
9. Tassel & Naturel feat. DJ Cam – "Drivin'"
10. Teknic Old School – "Stop Trying"

== Volume 9 ==
Saint-Germain-des-Prés Café, Volume 9

Compilation album by Various Artists
- Released: August 27, 2007
- Genre: House, lounge, nu jazz
- Label: Wagram Records

Disc one

1. Nostalgia 77 – "Wildflower"
2. Us3 – "I'll Be Right Back"
3. Native – "Prussian Blue (Nicola Conte Jazz Dance Rework)"
4. Koop feat. Yukimi Nagano – "Come to Me"
5. The Five Corners Quintet – "Trading Eights"
6. Sheila Landis – "Summertime"
7. Metropolitan Jazz Affair – "Everybody Knows"
8. Micatone – "Nomad (Radio Citizen Mix)"
9. Third Eye a.k.a. Nicola Conte – "Macedonia"
10. Nils Krogh – "Things We Do"
11. Spiritual South – "Calypso Blues"
12. Smoove feat. the Bukky Leo Quintet and Darren Grainger – "Rejoice in Righteousness (Smoove's Nu Jazz Remix)"
13. Me and You – "Last Night"
14. Spengler – "Good Things"
15. Kero One – "In All the Wrong Places"
16. [re:jazz] – "People Hold On (Alternate a capella take)"
17. Jazzanova feat. Clara Hil – "That Night (Live at the SK Office)"

Disc two – DJ Cam Quartet

1. "Rebirth of Cool"
2. "So Sweet"
3. "New York New York"
4. "It's Yours" feat. Inlove
5. "Tribute to J Dilla"
6. "Raise Up"
7. "Saint-Germain"
8. "Hold Tight"
9. "Visions"
10. "Back in the Days"

== Volume 10 ==
Saint-Germain-des-Prés Café, Volume 10

Compilation album by Various Artists
- Released: October 21, 2008
- Genre: House, lounge, nu jazz
- Label: Wagram Records

Disc one – The Nu Jazz Session

1. PPP feat. Karma – "On a Cloud"
2. Waldeck – "Memories"
3. Shirley Bassey – "Light My Fire (Kenny Dope Remix)"
4. Jamie Lidell – "Little Bit of Feel Good (Señor Coconut Remix)"
5. Jazz Liberatorz feat. Tre Hardson, Fat Lip & Omni – "Ease My Mind"
6. Slow Train Soul – "Ma soucouyant"
7. St Germain – "My Mama Said"
8. DJ Disse – "Break on Through"
9. Nicole Willis & The Soul Investigators – "If This Ain't Love"
10. Soulard Sound – "Things We Do (Nils Krogh Alternative Take)"
11. Llorca – "Indigo Blues"
12. Nekta – "No Need to Rumble"
13. Koop – "Relaxin at Club F****n (Dorfmeister vs. Madrid de los Austrias Version)"
14. Marcina Arnold – "Forefathers"
15. The Amalgamation of Soundz – "Enchant Me"
16. Club des Belugas – "Take Three"
17. Jill Scott – "Brotha"
18. Térez Montcalm – "Sweet Dreams"

Disc two – The Nu SoulJazzFunk Mix by Quantic

1. The Quantic Soul Orchestra – "Melodious Wayfarer"
2. Milez Benjiman – "Soundcheckin'"
3. TM Juke – "Life, Rain, Fall"
4. Quantic presents Flower Inferno – "Ciudad del Swing"
5. Hot 8 Brass Band – "It's Real"
6. Saravah Soul – "Arroz com Feijão"
7. Lizzy Parks – "All That (Instrumental)"
8. The Bamboos – "One Man Entourage"
9. Quantic feat. Alice Russell – "Sound of Everything"
10. Nostalgia 77 – "Wildflower"
11. Natural Self – "In the Morning"
12. The Bamboos – "Eel Oil"
13. The Quantic Soul Orchestra – "Marrakech"
14. Belleruche – "Northern Girls (DJ Vadim Rmx)"
15. Quantic presents Flower Inferno – "Death of the Revolution"
16. The Quantic Soul Orchestra – "Interlude"
17. Nostalgia 77 – "Freedom"
18. Quantic feat. Tempo – "Sabor"
19. Lanu – "Dis-Information"

== Volume 11 ==
Saint-Germain-des-Prés Café, Volume 11

Compilation album by Various Artists
- Released: October 12, 2009
- Genre: House, lounge, jazz
- Label: Wagram Music
- Producer: Jordan Paul

Disc one – The Nu Jazz Session

1. Chinese Man – "I've Got That Tune"
2. Wax Taylor feat. A.S.M. – "Say Yes"
3. Club des Belugas feat. Anna Luca – "Floating on Air"
4. Loopa Scave meets Cayetano feat. Pelina – "Up & Down"
5. Sharon Jones & The Dap-Kings – "100 Days, 100 Nights"
6. Parov Stelar – "Silent Snow"
7. Nekta – "Here's Us"
8. Caravane Palace – "Jolie Coquine"
9. TM Juke & The Jack Baker Trio feat. Andreya Triana – "That Gut Feeling"
10. Sumsuch – "Give It My All"
11. The Juju Orchestra feat. Terry Callier & Carolyn Leonhart – "What Is Hip?"
12. Mr Scruff feat. Alice Russell – "Music Takes Me Up"
13. Tribeqa – "Bridge the Gap"
14. The Herbaliser – "Mr Chombee Has the Flaw"
15. Smoove & Turrell – "Hammond"
16. The Jivers feat. Anqui – "Do What"
17. Big Horns B – "Mission Impossible"
18. Uptown Funk Empire – "Boogie"
19. Mayer Hawthorne & The county – "Just Ain't Gonna Work Out"
20. Booster feat. Sandra Nkak – "Sex Friend"

Disc two – The Belleruche Gramophone Session

1. Nostalgia 77 feat. The Fiction Trio – "My Name Is..."
2. Natural Self – "Feet Keep Moving"
3. Cru Jonez – "Painted Basement"
4. DJ Signify & Blockhead – "Nobody's Smiling"
5. Belleruche – "Backyard"
6. Brother Ali – "Uncle Sam Goddamn"
7. Blend Crafters – "Bad Luck Blues"
8. Natural Self feat. Abdominal – "Breathe Deep"
9. Milez Benjamin – "Chop That Wood"
10. Quasimoto – "Greenery"
11. Natural Self – "Faultlines"
12. Princesa – "Aqui Princesa (Marcelo Fabian Remix)"
13. Quantic and His Combo Bárbaro – "Enyere Kumbara"
14. Soopasoul feat. Dionne Charles – "Hot & Cold"
15. The Quantic Soul Orchestra – "Get a Move On"
16. The Limp Twins – "Elemental"
17. Belleruche – "Anything You Want (Not That)"
18. The Correspondents – "Washington Square"

== Volume 12, The Blue Edition ==
Saint-Germain-des-Prés Café, Volume 12

Compilation album by Various Artists
- Released: October 29, 2010
- Genre: House, lounge, nu jazz
- Label: Wagram Music

Volume 12 is also known as Saint-Germain-des-Prés Café – The Blue Edition. The second disc was mixed by Mr. Scruff.

Disc one – Cool Tempo Session

1. Blundetto feat. Hindi Zahra – "Voices" – 2:56
2. Aloe Blacc – "Miss Fortune" – 3:59
3. Joe Dukie & DJ Fitchie feat. Fat Freddy's Drop – "This Room" – 6:03
4. Julien Dyne feat. Mara TK – "Layer" – 3:31
5. Bibio – "Jealous of Roses" – 2:23
6. Blackjoy with Aqeel – "Downtown Jenny" – 3:18
7. Space Invadas – "Imaginist" – 2:55
8. Kero One – "Check the Blueprints" – 4:20
9. Suff Daddy – "Join the Club" – 2:36
10. Dafuniks feat. Elias – "Hello, I Love You" – 2:45
11. Seu Jorge & Almaz – "Everybody Loves the Sunshine" – 4:57
12. CFCF – "Invitation to Love" – 5:48
13. Mayer Hawthorne – "Green Eyed Love (Classixx Remix)" – 4:36
14. Hint feat. Laura Vane – "One Woman Army" - 3:31
15. Dee Edwards – "Why Can't There Be Love (Pilooski Edit)" – 3:00
16. Ben Westbeech – "So Good Today (Yoruba Soul Remix)" 5:35
17. Milez Benjiman – "All the People"" – 4:17
18. José James – "Desire (Moodyman Remix)" – 5:06
19. Stateless – "Bloodstream" – 5:11

Disc two – A Ninja Tune Session by Mr. Scruff

1. Homelife – "Fair-Weather Friend" – 4:33
2. DJ Food – "Consciousness" – 0:59
3. Mr. Scruff – "Bass Baby" – 3:15
4. Pest – "Chicken Spit" – 3:40
5. London Funk Allstars – "Never Can Get Enough" – 4:30
6. The Herbaliser – "Moon Sequence (Radio Silence)" – 3:45
7. Treva Whateva – "Singalong" – 5:00
8. Poets of Rhythm – "Survival of the Freshest" – 3:06
9. Luke Vibert – "Get Your Head Down" – 4:42
10. Chocolate Weasel – "Music for Body Lockers (Reworked from Shatners Bassoon)" – 2:33
11. DJ Vadim feat. Demolition – "Up to Jah" – 2:47
12. Bonobo – "Flutter" – 4:25
13. Chris Bowden – "Beautiful Nasty (4 Hero Remix)" – 5:26
14. DJ Food – "Scratch Yer Head (Squarepusher Remix)" – 7:32
15. Amon Tobin – "Chomp Samba" – 3:45
16. The Cinematic Orchestra – "Channel 1 Suite" – 3:45
17. Ty – "We Don't Care" – 3:55
18. Roots Manuva – "Juggle Tings Proper" – 4:24
19. DJ Food – "Nocturne" – 7:14

== Volume 13, The Must-Have Cool Tempo Selection by Bart & Baker ==
Saint-Germain-des-Prés Café: The Must-Have Cool Tempo Selection by Bart & Baker

Compilation album by Various Artists
- Released: October 17, 2011
- Genre: House, lounge, nu jazz, jazz
- Label: Wagram Music

Volume 13 is also known as The Must-Have Cool Tempo Selection by Bart & Baker.

Disc one - The Parisian Lifestyle Soundtrack

1. Quadron - Slippin"
2. Ornette - "Crazy"
3. Isaac Aesili - "With You in My Bed"
4. Cocoon - "American Boy"
5. Bibio - Anything New"
6. General Elektriks - "Summer Is Here"
7. Hollie Cook - "Milk & Honey"
8. Fm Laeti - "Rise in the Sun"
9. Ben Westbeech - "The Book"
10. Hawa - "Was Born to Love"
11. The Sweet Vandals - "Move It On"
12. Bart & Baker - "Istanbul (Not Constantinople)"
13. Omar feat. Angie Stone - "Stylin'"
14. Raashan Ahmad feat. Aloe Blacc - "Falling"
15. Ladi6 - "Like Water"
16. Motor City Drum Ensemble - "Basement L.O.V.E."
17. Slove - "Do We Need"
18. Siri Svegler - "Silent Viewer (Chopstick & John Jon Remix)"
19. Donae'o - "I"

Disc two - Vintage Mix by Bart & Baker

1. Gene Krupa Sextet - "Meddle My Minor"
2. Count Basie Orchestra - "Tickle Toe"
3. Sonny Rollins - "St Thomas"
4. Ella Fitzgerald - "Solid as a Rock"
5. Sidney Bechet - "Joshua Fit the Battle of Jericho"
6. Ramsey Lewis Trio - "Delilah"
7. Jimmie Lunceford - "Four or Five Times"
8. The Four Clefs - "I Like Pie I Like Cake"
9. Nina Simone - "Come On Back Jack"
10. Louis Armstrong - "Cuban Pete"
11. Artie Shaw's Gramercy Five - "There Must Be Something Better Than Love"
12. Lionel Hampton - "Dough-Ray-Mi"
13. Charlie Barnet & His Orchestra - "Cement Mixer"
14. Charlie Mingus - "Boogie Stop Shuffle"
15. Franky Lymon - "Goody Goody"
16. Frankie Vaughan - "Tweedle Dee"
17. Rose Murphy - "Peek-a-Boo"
18. Scatman Crothers - "Keep That Coffee Hot"
19. Smith Ballew - "Why Do You Suppose?"
20. Paul Smith - "My Favourite Thing"

== Volume 14 ==
Saint-Germain-des-Prés Café, Volume 14

Compilation album by Various artists
- Released: October 22, 2012
- Genre: Nu jazz, lounge
- Length: 6:05:28
- Label: Wagram Records

Disc one - The Parisian Lifestyle Soundtrack

1. Deluxe Featuring Cyph4 - "Polishing Peanuts"
2. Wax Tailor feat. Jennifer Charles - "Heart Stop"
3. Om Unit feat. Tamara Blessa - "Dark Sunrise"
4. Ornette Coleman - "Crazy (Nôze Remix)"
5. Mercury - "Old Man's House (Original Mix)"
6. Solomun - "Daddy's Jam (Original Mix)"
7. HNQO - "Point of View (Original Mix)"
8. Lukas Graham - "Ordinary Things (Wankelmut Remix)"
9. Danny Daze & Matches - "If This"
10. Marcus Meinhardt - "Checkpot (Pele & Findling Remix)"
11. Ronald Christoph feat. Orlando - "Take Off, Baby!"
12. Junior - "I Don't Listen Much (Mercury Remix)"
13. Dapayk & Padberg feat. Caro - "Island (Nôze Swimming Circles Remix)"
14. Niconé & Sascha Braemer feat. Narra - "Caje"
15. Nufrequency feat. Ben Onono - "Fallen Hero (Motor City Drum Ensemble Remix)"
16. Noriel Vilela - "16 Toneladas (Sixteen Tons)"
17. Guts - "Brand New Revolution"
18. Jupiter - "One O Six"
19. Abigoba feat. Erik Truffaz - "What Is the Link?"

Disc two - Compost Records Selection

1. Joash Featuring Replife - "Mission"
2. Marbert Rocel - "'Cause of Lovin"
3. Rainer Trüby - "Welcome to Our World"
4. Pitto feat. Nicolette - "Something Happened (Pitto Vocal Remix)"
5. El Freakadell - "I Got You (Mudegg's Mammuth Disco Remix)"
6. Pitchben - "Stand Up (Runaway Remix)"
7. Pitchben - "Keep Giving Me Love"
8. Phreek Plus One feat. Mr. White - "Passion (Original Version)"
9. Show-B & Thomas Herb - "Paradisus (Main Mix)"
10. Rey & Kjavik - "Face It"
11. John Gazoo - "Midnight Runner (John Gazoo's Second Version)"
12. Marsmobil - "Patience (Reprise Long Version)"
13. Marbert Rocel - "Let's Take Off"
14. Robert Owens - "Hearts & Soul (Christo Disco Rinse Remix)"
15. Joash feat. Andy Herbertson - "The Simple Things"

== Volume 15, The Must-Have Playlist from Paris ==
Saint-Germain-des-Prés Café, Volume 15

Compilation album by Various Artists
- Released: 2013
- Genre: Nu jazz, lounge
- Length: 2:25:54
- Label: Wagram Records

Volume 15 is also known as Saint-Germain-des-Prés Café – The Must-Have Playlist from Paris. The second disc was mixed by Thievery Corporation.

Disc one – The Parisian Lifestyle Soundtrack

1. Fakear - "Morning in Japan" - 3:05
2. TY - "Like You Never" - 5:13
3. Harleighblu - "Let Me Be" - 3:55
4. Dragon Suplex - "First Kiss" - 5:06
5. The Avender - "Fade Out Lines (Original Mix)" - 3:14
6. Crazy P - "Never Gonna Reach Me (Hot Toddy Mix)" - 9:03
7. Ryan Dupree - "Can You Handle It (Teenage Mutants Remix)" - 6:14
8. La Fine Équipe - "Gremlins (feat. Asm)" - 3:23
9. Crayon feat. KLP - "Give You Up (Darius Remix)" - 5:24
10. Rey & Kjavik - "Hwmym (Original Mix)" - 6:58
11. Weiss - "My Sister (Original Mix)" - 6:10
12. Yuksek feat. Oh Land - "Last of Our Kind (Michael Garcon Remix)" - 5:38
13. Bakermat - "Uitzicht" - 4:09
14. Bart & Baker feat. Pheel Balliana - "Windows of the World (Chris Coco Remix)" - 5:41
15. Klangkarussell - "Sonnentanz (Sascha Braemer Remix)" - 6:41
16. Liquid Phonk - "Heart & Soul (Original Mix)" - 6:41
17. Sailor & I - "Tough Love (Pablo Nouvelle Remix)" - 5:15
18. Nightmares on Wax - "You Wish (Original Mix)" - 3:30

Disc two – Selected & Mixed by Thievery Corporation

1. Ocote Soul Sounds & Adrian Quesada - "Vendendo Saude & Fe" - 4:28
2. Congo Sanchez - "Democrazy" - 3:33
3. Ocote Soul Sounds - "Tamarindo (Thievery Corporation mix)" - 4:25
4. Thievery Corporation - "El pueblo unido (Jeremy Sole feat. Quantic Remix)" - 4:09
5. Thunderball - "Road to Benares (Bombay Dub Orchestra Remix) - 5:51
6. Federico Aubele - "Corazon (Ursula 1000 Remix)" - 4:07
7. Ancient Astronauts - "Oblivion (Make Remix)" - 5:56
8. Afrolicious - "A Dub for Mali" - 5:58
9. Novalima - "Diablo (Sabo’s Moombahton Remix)" - 5:19
10. Afrolicious - "Bade Malou (Second Sky & Thomas Blondet Remix)" - 5:02
11. Karminsky - "Experience Belly Disco (Beat Fanatic Remix)" - 4:19
12. Ocote Soul Sounds & Adrian Quesada - "La Reja (Nickodemus Remix)" - 5:33
13. Thievery Corporation feat. Femi Kuti - "Vampires (Afrolicious and Rob Garza Remix)" - 7:16
14. Nickodemus - "The Love Feeling (Christian Prommer Remix)" - 9:23

== See also ==
- Deep house
- Nu jazz
- Acid jazz
- Jazz
- Jazz rap
