= Desmond Williams (musician) =

American electronica musician

- Born: Jamaica
- Origin: New Jersey
- Genres: Electronic, Dub, Reggae
- Occupations: Musician, producer
- Instruments: Keyboards, bass, guitar, singing
- Years active: 1993–present
- Labels: RAS, ESL, Rhythm & Culture
- Formerly of: Browntempo

Desmond Williams is an American electronica musician, as well as a record producer and was the chief sound engineer for the Eighteenth Street Lounge Music record label. Born in Jamaica and raised in Montclair, New Jersey, Williams has been known for his remixing and producing style.

== Biography ==
In 1993, Williams began working with Scientist. Together, they did a great deal of experimentation with new digital audio techniques, as well as mixing live events for such artists as Third World (band), Supercat, Freddie McGregor, etc. In 1995, they co-produced an album for Sugar Minott entitled International for RAS Records. At this time, Williams also was the house sound engineer at the Takoma Station Tavern Jazz club in Washington, D.C. At this time he did sound for almost every Reggae and Jazz band in town, including Chuck Brown, Little Bennie, Sugar Bear from E.U., Black Sheep, and Carl Malcolm.

In 2000, he was hired by Thievery Corporation to work with their fledgling studio. William performed many tasks for Thievery Corporation and the label, ESL Music. He was the head engineer, co-producer for many of Thievery Corporations tracks, played bass, guitar, and keyboards for most of the tracks on the Thievery albums, The Mirror Conspiracy, Outernationalist and Richest Man In Babylon, and was responsible for basic production work on many of the Thievery Corporation remixes.

In 2000, Williams created his initial EP, Theme from a Dream. In 2002, he released his debut album, Delights of the Garden. After leaving ESL Music in 2003, Williams co-founded the Washington, D.C.–based Rhythm & Culture Recordings record label with then partner, Farid Ali. He released an EP entitled East West Highway, and collaborated with Philip Brooks, formerly of Avatars of Dub, to form a group called Browntempo (a phrase he coined to describe their music). Browntempo had one release on Rhythm & Culture Recordings.

In 2007, William collaborated with Morel of Deep Dish for the release of his cover version of the Nirvana track, "Smells Like Teen Spirit". This version was included in the limited edition Heart Shaped Box Box set, which included unreleased Nirvana tracks, live tracks and notable cover versions of Nirvana songs. This is an excerpt from The Daily Swarm's article about the 5-CD box set – "The music encased inside is 3 discs of 50 songs performed by Nirvana, plus another 2 discs of covers, including renditions of "Smells Like Teen Spirit" by Paul Anka, Scala, Tori Amos, Patti Smith, and Desmond Williams; tracks by Charlie Hunter Trio, Steve Earle, Herbie Hancock, Sinéad O'Connor, and Stereophonics; and multi-song sets of Nirvana songs done as lullabies and orchestral scores. 500 numbered boxes were made."

In 2008, William collaborated with Vaughn Benjamin of the Midnite reggae band and released an album titled Kayamagan.

In 1996, he had a son, by he name of Imani, who is currently making music, classified in genres such as Hip Hop, and R&B, and Neo-Soul, under the name of "IiMZ".

== Discography ==
- 1995 International w/Sugar Minot
- 2000 Theme From a Dream (EP)
- 2000 Cocoa (EP)
- 2001 Um Favor (EP)
- 2001 This Morning (EP)
- 2002 Delights of the Garden
- 2003 East West Highway (EP)
- 2004 Browntempo (EP)
- 2006 Smells Like Teen Spirit (with Morel)
- 2008 Kayamagan (with Midnite)
