= Radio Retaliation =

Studio album by Thievery Corporation
- Released: September 23, 2008
- Recorded: April 2007 – August 2008
- Genres: Trip hop; downtempo; electronica
- Label: ESL
- Producer: Thievery Corporation

Thievery Corporation chronology
Versions (2006)	Radio Retaliation (2008)	Culture of Fear (2011)

Professional ratings
Aggregate scores
Source	Rating
Metacritic	63/100
Review scores
Source	Rating
AllMusic	4/5 stars
Pitchfork	2.6/10
PopMatters	6/10

Radio Retaliation is the fifth studio album by American electronic music duo Thievery Corporation, released on September 23, 2008 by ESL Music. Intended to be a political album, it was recorded in the band's hometown of Washington, D.C. from April 2007 to August 2008.

A pre-release of the album was released on iTunes on September 9, 2008, featuring an exclusive track entitled "Philosopher’s Stone". The band also promoted the album through Facebook and iLike. The music video for "The Numbers Game" single debuted on December 15.

The album was nominated for a Grammy Award in the category Best Recording Package. The album cover shows a photograph of the Mexican rebel Subcomandante Marcos.

== Track listing ==
1. "Sound the Alarm" (featuring Sleepy Wonder) – 3:41
2. "Mandala" (featuring Anoushka Shankar on sitar) - 4:00
3. "Radio Retaliation" (featuring Sleepy Wonder) – 3:26
4. "Vampires" (featuring Femi Kuti) – 4:57
5. "Hare Krisna" (featuring Seu Jorge) – 3:35
6. "El Pueblo Unido" (featuring Verny Varela) – 3:29
7. "(The Forgotten People)" – 3:10
8. "33 Degree" (featuring Zee) – 3:47
9. "Beautiful Drug" (featuring Jana Andevska) – 3:27
10. "La Femme Parallel" (featuring LouLou Ghelichkhani) – 4:29
11. "Retaliation Suite" – 2:53
12. "The Numbers Game" (featuring Chuck Brown) – 3:03
13. "The Shining Path" – 3:38
14. "Blasting Through the City" (featuring Notch) – 3:33
15. "Sweet Tides" (featuring LouLou Ghelichkhani) – 4:48

iTunes bonus tracks

16. "Philosopher's Stone" – 4:10
17. "Vampires" (Louis Vega House Remix) – 9:42
18. "Vampires" (Louie Vega Dub Remix) – 9:42
19. "Mandala" (Pathaan Remix) – 5:37

== Charts ==
=== Weekly charts ===
Weekly chart performance for Radio Retaliation
Chart (2008)	Peak position
Belgian Albums (Ultratop Flanders)	64
Canadian Albums (Nielsen SoundScan)	54
Dutch Alternative Albums (MegaCharts)	21
French Albums (SNEP)	108
Italian Albums (FIMI)	59
New Zealand Albums (RMNZ)	35
Swiss Albums (Schweizer Hitparade)	79
UK Albums (Official Charts)	175
UK Dance Albums (Official Charts)	4
US Billboard 200	35
US Independent Albums (Billboard)	5
US Top Dance Albums (Billboard)	1

=== Year-end charts ===
Year-end chart performance for Radio Retaliation
Chart (2008)	Position
US Top Dance/Electronic Albums (Billboard)	21
Chart (2009)	Position
US Top Dance/Electronic Albums (Billboard)	24
