= The Richest Man in Babylon (album) =

Studio album by Thievery Corporation
- Released: September 30, 2002
- Recorded: December 2000 – August 2002
- Genre: Lounge; dub; trip hop; electronica
- Length: 56:58
- Label: ESL
- Producer: Rob Garza; Eric Hilton

Thievery Corporation chronology
The Mirror Conspiracy (2000)	The Richest Man in Babylon (2002)	The Cosmic Game (2005)

The Richest Man in Babylon is the third studio album by American electronic music duo Thievery Corporation. It was first released on September 30, 2002 in Belgium and on October 1, 2002 in the United States by ESL Music. The album features contributions from Emiliana Torrini, LouLou, Pam Bricker, and Notch, and features both electronic and live instrumentation. The album combines influences such as dub, jazz, dance music, rap, reggae, and Indian music, and incorporates protest music into the group's sound. A remix/dub version of the album was released in 2004 titled Babylon Rewound featuring the previously unreleased track "Truth And Rights".

== Reception ==
Professional ratings
Review scores
Source	Rating
AllMusic	3/5 stars
Blender	2/5 stars
Pitchfork	3.8/10
Rolling Stone	4/5 stars
Vibe	3/5 stars

The critical reception was mixed. BBC's Collective magazine said that "This, their third 'proper' album, is certainly their most complete work to date, and arguably the first to be presented as one complete, cohesive whole. [... T]his ranks as Thievery Corporation's finest yet." AllMusic's John Bush felt that the album "doesn't have the hooks or the production finesse to compete with The Mirror Conspiracy" but that "a few tracks on the backside do plow new ground, thanks in part to new guests". Aidin Vaziri of Vibe wrote about the duo's penchant for reviving sounds from long ago: "Even when they dip into lightweight reggae territory on the title track, the results hang together surprisingly well." Ryan Eliot of Blender called it "big-budget background noise, purpose-built for any one of the plush cocktail bars it's soon to be endlessly played in, but lacking anything as distinct as, say, a personality of its own." Among fans the album is popular, peaking at number nine on Billboard's Independent Albums list on October 19, 2002 and number 2 on the Dance/Electronic Albums list on October 26, 2002. A month after the album was released, The Richest Man in Babylon had 25,000 sales in the United States.

== Track listing ==
No.	Title	Featuring	Length
1.	"Heaven's Gonna Burn Your Eyes"	Emilíana Torrini (vocals)	4:10
2.	"Facing East"	Pam Bricker (vocals) Max Sadeghi (Santur)	3:43
3.	"The Outernationalist"	Ras Pidow (vocals)	3:30
4.	"Interlude"		1:21
5.	"Omid (Hope)"	LouLou Ghelichkhani (vocals)	3:48
6.	"All That We Perceive"	Pam Bricker (vocals)	3:46
7.	"Un Simple Histoire (A Simple Story)"	LouLou Ghelichkhani (vocals)	3:45
8.	"Meu Destino (My Destiny)"	Patrick dos Santos (vocals)	3:29
9.	"Exilio (Exile)"	Verny Varela (vocals & flute)	3:03
10.	"From Creation"		4:19
11.	"The Richest Man in Babylon"	Notch	3:50
12.	"Liberation Front"		5:04
13.	"The State of the Union"	Sleepy Wonder and Shinehead (vocals)	4:28
14.	"Until the Morning"	Emilíana Torrini (vocals)	3:56
15.	"Resolution"		4:46

== Charts ==
Chart performance for The Richest Man in Babylon
Chart (2002)	Peak position
Australian Albums (ARIA)	40
Austrian Albums (Ö3 Austria)	45
French Albums (SNEP)	43
German Albums (Offizielle Top 100)	42
Italian Albums (FIMI)	22
New Zealand Albums (RMNZ)	9
UK Albums (OCC)	139
US Billboard 200	150
US Independent Albums (Billboard)	9
US Top Dance Albums (Billboard)	2

== Release history ==
Release history for The Richest Man in Babylon
Region	Release date
Belgium	September 30, 2002
United States	October 1, 2002
Australia	2002
France	2002
Russia	2002
