= Back for Good (song) =

1995 single by Take That

- Single cover

Single by Take That

from the album Nobody Else
- Released: 27 March 1995
- Genre: Pop
- Length: 4:02
- Label: RCA; BMG
- Songwriter: Gary Barlow
- Producers: Chris Porter; Gary Barlow

Take That singles chronology
"Sure" (1994)	"Back for Good" (1995)	"Never Forget" (1995)

Alternative cover
- American CD single artwork

Music video
- "Back for Good" on YouTube

"Back for Good" is a song by English boy band Take That from their album Nobody Else (1995). "Back for Good" was written by lead singer Gary Barlow and released on 27 March 1995. The ballad topped charts in 31 countries, including the UK. At the 1996 Brit Awards, "Back for Good" won the Brit Award for British Single of the Year and Best Single at the 1995 Smash Hits Awards.

== Background ==
"Back for Good" is a "triumphant ballad...ruminating on life, love, and second chances". It was written by Gary Barlow (who also sang lead vocals) and engineered by keyboard player Phil Coxon of OMD. Barlow has said that he wrote the song in fifteen minutes. It was unveiled at the 1995 BRIT Awards, and there was such demand for the song that its release date was brought forward. "Back for Good" was made available to the media an unprecedented six weeks before release.

Just prior to the release of "Back for Good", the group had done a photo shoot for Vogue Italia with designer Gianni Versace. The clothing range given to the band by Versace is featured on the single cover.

== Release and chart performance ==
"Back for Good" was released on 27 March 1995 and entered the UK Singles Chart at number one. The single sold nearly 350,000 copies in its first week, making it one of the fastest-selling singles of the year. "Back for Good" sold almost as many units as the other songs from that week's Top 10 combined. It was included on the album Nobody Else.

"Back for Good" remained at number one in the United Kingdom for four weeks. The song has received a double platinum sales status certification in the United Kingdom, and is also still regularly ranked high in United Kingdom based favourite ever songs polls. It is Take That's biggest selling single from the 1990s and second overall behind "Rule the World", with UK sales of 1.2 million as of September 2017. The song won British Single of the Year at the 1996 Brit Awards.

"Back for Good" peaked at number seven on the United States Billboard Hot 100, spending a total of 30 weeks on the chart, 66 weeks on the US Adult Contemporary chart, and 30 weeks on the Top 40 US Airplay chart. It reached number one in 31 countries.

The single topped the Eurochart Hot 100 for five consecutive weeks.

== Critical reception ==
Steve Baltin from Cash Box stated Take That had "a massive hit on its hands with this very straight-ahead blue-eyed soul ballad." He described it as a "nice, soothing track", adding that "Back for Good" "won’t revolutionize music, but it shows a young band very good at what it does." Chuck Campbell from Knoxville News Sentinel said that the song "features a fine melody line and background vocals that decorate the song with perfect finesse" and called the song "a great pop confection". He also asserted that "Back for Good" was, by far, the best song on the Nobody Else album. In his weekly UK chart commentary, James Masterton called "Back for Good" "one of the most breathtakingly brilliant pop singles that had been heard in a long long time" and added that it was "arguably the band's masterpiece". "If it touches people, it's a good song," remarked Noel Gallagher in an interview with Mojo. "You know, people go on about Take That – but 'Back for Good' said something to me. And if it touches me…"'

Pan-European magazine Music & Media commented, "With a romantic 'film ballad' like this, Take That trespasses Wet Wet Wet's territory, which opens the possibility to crossover to an older audience–the female 25+ demo?–for the first time". A reviewer from Music Week gave the song a rating of five out of five and named it Single of the Week, writing, "Take That play it safe opting for a nice-not naughty MOR pop number which will pick up sales outside their usual fanbase. With more than a month of radio support behind it, an instant, and long lasting, number one seems certain". The magazine later added, "Expect to hear this beautifully-arranged, classic pop ballad on the radio and jukeboxes for many years to come". Ian McCann from NME said, "'Back for Good' is just too classy, too like a Cliff Richard Christmas adult ballad about how he misses the wife he's never actually had, and what a painful divorce, which he's never actually had, is." Another NME editor, Johnny Dee, praised it as "a peerless piece of classic pop". Gerald Martinez from New Sunday Times called it "a beautifully produced love ballad."

In December 1995, NME ranked "Back for Good" number 47 in their list of "NME Writers' Top 50 Singles of 1995". In 2015, Idolator called the song a "pop masterpiece". In 2018, it was ranked eleventh by Billboard critics in their compilation of the "100 Greatest Boyband Songs of All Time". In 2020, Rolling Stone ranked the song number 15 in their list of "75 Greatest Boy Band Songs of All Time". Also in 2020, The Guardian ranked it at number 53 in their list of "The 100 greatest UK No 1s".

In 2003, Q Magazine ranked the song at number 910 in their list of the "1001 Best Songs Ever".

== Music video ==
The music video for "Back for Good" was shot in black and white on 27 February 1995 and directed by British directors Vaughan Arnell and Anthea Benton. It shows the band walking and dancing in the rain. Most of the outdoor footage was filmed at the backlot of Pinewood Studios. "Back for Good" was also the last Take That video to include Robbie Williams until 2010. A 1958 Chevrolet Impala and a 1951 Mercury Custom were used in the video. Because they filmed the video in cold and wet conditions, several members of Take That caught the flu.

The "Back for Good" video has often been an influence in the band performing the song live, as the band often makes use of artificial rain when performing it. It also appears on the DVD release, Never Forget: The Ultimate Collection and was made available on Take That's official YouTube channel in 2009.

== Usage in media and cover versions ==
The song was a big hit in Brazil during 1995 and 1996, thanks to soap opera Explode Coração: the song was one of the main songs on the television show's soundtrack.

In an effort to mock his boy band roots, group member turned solo artist Robbie Williams performed a 'hard rock' live version in the style of the Sex Pistols, which was a B-side to his single "Angels" (1997). Williams performed this arrangement of the song with Mark Owen, as the encore at his record-breaking Knebworth Park concerts and eventually performed this version with Take That, upon receiving his Brit Icon Award in 2016.

The song was featured on the final episode of the second series of Spaced, in which Tim, Brian, and Mike, along with Mike's Territorial Army buddies, attempt to play the song for Marsha, a la the boombox scene from Say Anything... It also featured in the final episode of Ricky Gervais and Stephen Merchant's The Office as a love theme for characters Tim (Martin Freeman) and Dawn (Lucy Davis). It's featured in British hospital comedy series Green Wing as a dream sequence with Julian Rhind-Tutt's character Mac enacting all members of Take That.

Gary Barlow stated on ITV1's An Audience with Take That Live broadcast on 2 December 2006 that there were 89 versions recorded by other artists.

Faith No More covered the song on their 1995 tour for the album King for a Day... Fool for a Lifetime. The song also was covered in a hip hop/dancehall style by Born Jamericans on their 1997 album, Yardcore.

"Back for Good" was covered by Boyz II Men for their Love album, by the Wedding Present for their How the West Was Won album, by McAlmont & Butler in 2002 for the "NME in Association with War Child Presents 1 Love" charity album, and by the Concretes on the Guilt by Association Vol. 1 compilation. Coldplay performed the song with Gary Barlow at Shepherd's Bush Empire, London in aid of War Child in 2009. Barlow also performed the song with JLS at the O2 Apollo Manchester date of his 2012 concert tour.

== Track listings ==
- UK 7-inch vinyl (74321 27146 7)
1. "Back for Good" (Radio Mix) – 3:59
2. "Sure" (Live) – 3:16
3. "Back for Good" (TV Mix) – 4:03
- UK cassette single (74321 27148 2)
1. "Back for Good" (Radio Mix) – 3:59
2. "Sure" (Live) – 3:16
3. "Back for Good" (TV Mix) – 4:03
- UK CD single 1 (74321 27146 2)
1. "Back for Good" (Radio Mix) – 3:59
2. "Sure" (Live) – 3:16
3. "Beatles Tribute" (Live at Wembley Arena) – 11:40
- UK CD single 2 (74321 27147 2)
1. "Back for Good" (Radio Mix) – 3:59
2. "Pray" (Radio Edit) – 3:43
3. "Why Can't I Wake Up with You" (Radio Edit) – 3:37
4. "A Million Love Songs" (7" Edit) – 3:53
- European CD single 1 (74321 27963 2)
1. "Back for Good" (Radio Mix) – 3:59
2. "Sure" (Live) – 3:16
- European CD single 2 (74321 27964 2)
1. "Back for Good" (Radio Mix) – 3:59
2. "Sure" (Live) – 3:16
3. "Beatles Tribute" (Live at Wembley Arena) – 11:40
- Japanese CD single (BVCP-9852)
1. "Back for Good" (Radio Mix) – 3:59
2. "Sure" (Live) – 3:16
3. "Pray" (Radio Edit) – 3:43
4. "Why Can't I Wake Up with You" (Radio Edit) – 3:37
5. "A Million Love Songs" (7" Edit) – 3:53
- US CD single 1 (07822-12880-5)
1. "Back for Good" – 4:03
2. "Love Ain't Here Anymore" – 3:57
3. "Back for Good" (Live From MTV's Most Wanted) – 4:10
- US CD single 2 (07822-12880-2)
1. "Back for Good" – 4:03
2. "Love Ain't Here Anymore" – 3:57
3. "Back for Good" (Radio Mix) – 3:59
4. "Back for Good" (Urban Mix) – 4:02
5. "Back for Good" (Live from MTV's Most Wanted) – 4:10
- US cassette single (07822-12880-7)
1. "Back for Good" – 4:03
2. "Love Ain't Here Anymore" – 3:57
- US 7-inch vinyl (07822-12880-5)
1. "Back for Good" – 4:03
2. "Love Ain't Here Anymore" – 3:57
- US 12-inch vinyl – Jukebox release only (TAKEBFG1)
1. "Back for Good" – 4:03
2. "Back for Good" (Radio Mix) – 3:59
3. "Back for Good" (Radio Instrumental) – 3:59
4. "Back for Good" (Urban Mix) – 4:02
5. "Back for Good" (Urban Instrumental) – 4:02

== Personnel ==
- Gary Barlow – lead vocals
- Howard Donald – backing vocals
- Jason Orange – backing vocals
- Mark Owen – backing vocals
- Robbie Williams – backing vocals

== Charts ==
=== Weekly charts ===
Weekly chart performance for "Back for Good"
Chart (1995–1996)	Peak position
Australia (ARIA)	1
Austria (Ö3 Austria Top 40)	3
Belgium (Ultratop 50 Flanders)	2
Belgium (Ultratop 50 Wallonia)	4
Canada Retail Singles (The Record)	7
Canada Top Singles (RPM)	1
Canada Adult Contemporary (RPM)	1
Chile (IFPI)	1
Denmark (IFPI)	2
El Salvador (El Siglo de Torreón)	8
Europe (Eurochart Hot 100)	1
Europe (European AC Radio)	2
Europe (European Dance Radio)	21
Europe (European Hit Radio)	1
Europe (Channel Crossovers)	1
Finland (Suomen virallinen lista)	2
Finland Airplay (Radiosoittolista)	4
France (SNEP)	7
France Airplay (SNEP)	2
Germany (GfK)	1
Greece (IFPI Greece)	1
Holland Airplay (Music & Media)	1
Iceland (Íslenski Listinn Topp 40)	5
Ireland (IRMA)	1
Israel (Israeli Singles Chart)	1
Italy (Musica e dischi)	5
Italy Airplay (Music & Media)	1
Japan (Oricon)	2
Latvia (Latvijas Top 40)	1
Lithuania (M-1)	1
Mexico (AMPROFON)	4
Netherlands (Dutch Top 40)	2
Netherlands (Single Top 100)	2
New Zealand (Recorded Music NZ)	6
Norway (VG-lista)	1
Panama (El Siglo de Torreón)	3
Poland Airplay (Music & Media)	8
Scottish Singles Sales (Official Charts)	1
Singapore (SPVA)	1
Spain (AFYVE)	1
Spain Airplay (Top 40 Radio)	1
Sweden (Sverigetopplistan)	2
Switzerland (Schweizer Hitparade)	2
UK Singles (Official Charts)	1
UK Airplay (Music Week)	1
US Billboard Hot 100	7
US Adult Contemporary (Billboard)	2
US Adult Pop Airplay (Billboard)	3
US Pop Airplay (Billboard)	9
US Cash Box Top 100	9
US Adult Contemporary (Radio & Records)	1
US CHR/Pop Top 50 (Radio & Records)	9
US Hot AC (Radio & Records)	1
Zimbabwe (ZIMA)	7

Chart (2005)	Peak position
UK Singles Downloads (Official Charts)	36

Chart (2012–2025)	Peak position
Finland Airplay (Radiosoittolista)	99
Romania Airplay (TopHit)	92
South Korea (Gaon)	52

=== Year-end charts ===
Chart (1995)	Position
Australia (ARIA)	9
Austria (Ö3 Austria Top 40)	16
Belgium (Ultratop 50 Flanders)	17
Belgium (Ultratop 50 Wallonia)	14
Brazil (Crowley)	14
Canada Top Singles (RPM)	17
Canada Adult Contemporary (RPM)	12
Europe (Eurochart Hot 100)	10
Europe (European AC Radio)	3
Europe (European Hit Radio)	2
Europe (Channel Crossovers)	1
France (SNEP)	36
France Airplay (SNEP)	23
Germany (Media Control)	7
Holland Airplay (Music & Media)	4
Iceland (Íslenski Listinn Topp 40)	20
Israel (Israeli Singles Chart)	6
Italy (Musica e dischi)	28
Italy Airplay (Music & Media)	1
Latvia (Latvijas Top 40)	1
Netherlands (Dutch Top 40)	25
Netherlands (Single Top 100)	25
New Zealand (RIANZ)	49
Norway Skoleslutt Period (VG lista)	2
Sweden (Topplistan)	19
Switzerland (Schweizer Hitparade)	8
UK Singles (OCC)	4
UK Airplay (Music Week)	1
US Billboard Hot 100	62
US Adult Contemporary (Billboard)	27
US Adult Contemporary (Radio & Records)	17
US CHR/Pop (Radio & Records)	44
US Hot AC (Radio & Records)	21

Chart (1996)	Position
Canada Top Singles (RPM)	97
Canada Adult Contemporary (RPM)	85
US Billboard Hot 100	95
US Adult Contemporary (Billboard)	1
US Adult Top 40 (Billboard)	26
US Top 40/Mainstream (Billboard)	84
US Adult Contemporary (Radio & Records)	20
US Hot AC (Radio & Records)	30

=== Decade-end charts ===
Chart (1990–1999)	Position
Ireland (IRMA)	26
UK Singles (OCC)	29

== Certifications and sales ==
Region	Certification	Certified units/sales
Australia (ARIA)	Platinum	70,000^{^}
Austria (IFPI Austria)	Gold	25,000^{*}
Belgium (BRMA)	Gold	25,000^{*}
Denmark (IFPI Danmark)	Platinum	90,000^{‡}
Germany (BVMI)	Gold	400,000
New Zealand (RMNZ)	Platinum	30,000^{‡}
Spain (Promusicae) Radio Mix	Gold	30,000^{‡}
United Kingdom (BPI)	2× Platinum	1,200,000^{‡}
United States	—	427,000
^{*} Sales figures based on certification alone.^{^} Shipments figures based on certification alone.^{‡} Sales+streaming figures based on certification alone.

== Release history ==
Region	Date	Format(s)	Label(s)	Ref.
United Kingdom	27 March 1995	7-inch vinyl; CD; cassette	RCA; BMG	
Japan	21 April 1995	CD	RCA; BMG	
United States	18 July 1995	Contemporary hit radio	Arista	
