= Sounds from the Thievery Hi-Fi =

Studio album by Thievery Corporation
- Released: 1996 (Germany); June 7, 1997 (United States)
- Recorded: 1996
- Genre: Electronic music
- Length: 72:09
- Label: ESL
- Producer: Rob Garza; Eric Hilton

Thievery Corporation chronology
Sounds from the Thievery Hi-Fi (1996)	The Mirror Conspiracy (2000)

Sounds from the Thievery Hi-Fi is the debut studio album by American electronic music duo Thievery Corporation. It was first released in 1996 in Germany and on June 7, 1997, by ESL Music in the United States. The guest vocalists include Pam Bricker and Bebel Gilberto. As of 2002, the album has sold over 33,000 copies in US according to Nielsen SoundScan.

== Critical reception ==
Professional ratings
Review scores
Source	Rating
AllMusic	3/5 stars
The Guardian	4/5 stars

The Pittsburgh Post-Gazette noted that "the Corporation raids our cultural memory for beats and wafts of melody that emerge as new, seamless commentaries on modern life." Music Week concluded that, "despite lapses into easy listening territory, it should appeal broadly to beatheads, post-clubbers and esoteric indie fans alike." The Guardian said that "Thievery Corporation are a couple of sonic pickpockets whose insatiable thirst for sampling encompasses genres as disparate as hip-hop, dub, easy listening and all manner of samba beats currently nestling on their hi-fi."

== Track listing ==
=== Original release ===
This version was released in 1996 by ESL Music in Germany. It was later released by 4AD in the United Kingdom and by Rough Trade Germany in Germany and in 2002 by Labels in France.

1. "A Warning (Dub)" – 2:21
2. "2001 Spliff Odyssey" – 7:45
3. "Shaolin Satellite" – 6:26
4. "Vivid" - 4:22
5. "Universal Highness" – 4:25
6. "Incident at Gate 7" – 6:27
7. "Scene at the Open Air Market" – 2:36
8. "The Glass Bead Game" – 6:15
9. "The Foundation" – 5:39
10. "Interlude" – 2:26
11. "The Oscillator" – 4:14
12. "So Vast as the Sky" - 5:02
13. "38.45 (A Thievery Number)" – 5:11
14. "Walking Through Babylon" – 4:27

=== US release ===
This was released by Eighteenth Street Lounge Music on June 7, 1997.

1. "A Warning (Dub)" – 2:14
2. "2001 Spliff Odyssey" – 5:06
3. "Shaolin Satellite" – 6:23
4. "Transcendence" – 4:06
5. "Universal Highness" – 4:21
6. "Incident at Gate 7" – 6:28
7. "Mañha" – 3:48
8. "Scene at the Open Air Market" – 2:57
9. "The Glass Bead Game" – 6:11
10. "Encounter in Bahia" – 3:59
11. "The Foundation" – 5:38
12. "Interlude" – 2:22
13. "The Oscillator" – 4:14
14. "Assault on Babylon" – 4:25
15. "38.45 (A Thievery Number)" – 5:06
16. "One" – 4:51

=== 2006 re-release ===
Eighteenth Street Lounge Music rereleased the album in early 2006 with the following track listing.

1. "A Warning (Dub)" – 2:14
2. "2001 Spliff Odyssey" – 5:06
3. "Shaolin Satellite" – 6:23
4. "Transcendence" – 4:06
5. "Universal Highness" – 4:21
6. "Incident at Gate 7" – 6:28
7. "Scene at the Open Air Market" – 2:57
8. "The Glass Bead Game" – 6:11
9. "Encounter in Bahia" – 3:59
10. "The Foundation" – 5:38
11. "Interlude" – 2:22
12. "The Oscillator" – 4:14
13. "Assault on Babylon" – 4:25
14. "38.45 (A Thievery Number)" – 5:06
15. "One" – 4:51
16. "Sun, Moon, and Stars" – 4:30
17. "Sleeper Car" – 3:07

=== Notes ===
- "Incident at Gate 7" contains a sample from Kool and the Gang's "Summer Madness".
- "The Glass Bead Game" contains a sample from Cal Tjader's "Samba Do Suenho".
- The album is dedicated to the memory of Antonio Carlos Jobim.

== Charts ==
Chart performance for Sounds from the Thievery Hi-Fi
Chart (2006)	Peak position
US Top Dance Albums (Billboard)	12
