= DJ-Kicks: Thievery Corporation =

Compilation album by Thievery Corporation
- Released: May 10, 1999
- Genre: Lounge
- Length: 63:23
- Label: Studio !K7 !K7076LP (LP) !K7076CD (CD)
- Producer: Thievery Corporation

Thievery Corporation chronology
Sounds from the Thievery Hi-Fi (1997)	DJ-Kicks: Thievery Corporation (1999)	The Mirror Conspiracy (2000)

DJ-Kicks chronology
Kemistry & Storm (1999)	Thievery Corporation (1999)	Kid Loco (1999)

Professional ratings
Review scores
Source	Rating
Allmusic	3/5 stars

DJ-Kicks: Thievery Corporation is a DJ mix album by Thievery Corporation. It was released on May 10, 1999, on the Studio !K7 independent record label as part of the DJ-Kicks series.

In 2009 it was awarded a gold certification from the Independent Music Companies Association which indicated sales of at least 100,000 copies throughout Europe.

== Track listing ==
1. "Tropicando" - Les Baxter – 2:34
2. "Rebirth" - A Forest Mighty Black – 4:13
3. "Beija Flor" - Da Lata – 3:33
4. "Mother Africa Feeding Sista India/2001" - Fun-Da-Mental / Thievery Corporation – 1:58
5. "Rainbow" - The 13th Sign – 3:46
6. "Success (Thievery Corporation Remix)" - DJ Cam – 3:00
7. "Emerald Alley" - Up, Bustle & Out – 3:25
8. "Exploration" - The Karminsky Experience – 3:07
9. "Coming From The Top" - Thievery Corporation – 3:23
10. "Ponteio (Bonus Beats)" - Da Lata – 1:22
11. "Guiro Electro (Rainer Trüby Trio Remix)" - Bobby Matos – 4:20
12. "Fedime's Flight" - Jazzanova – 4:59
13. "Janine" - Pronoia – 3:40
14. "Imperial" - Lazyboy – 3:40
15. "Transmission Central (Thievery Corporation Remix)" - Rockers Hi-Fi – 4:14
16. "Mathar (Richard Fearless Mix)" - Indian Vibes – 3:47
17. "Reign Dub" - Dual Tone – 4:13
18. "It Takes A Thief/DJ Kicks" - Thievery Corporation – 4:09
