= Culture of Fear =

Studio album by Thievery Corporation
- Released: June 28, 2011
- Recorded: 2010–2011
- Genres: Trip hop; reggae fusion; downtempo; electronica
- Length: 49:35
- Label: ESL
- Producer: Thievery Corporation

Thievery Corporation chronology
Radio Retaliation (2008)	Culture of Fear (2011)	Saudade (2014)

Professional ratings
Review scores
Source	Rating
AllMusic	3/5 stars
Paste	7/10 stars

Culture of Fear is the sixth studio album by American electronic music duo Thievery Corporation, released on June 28, 2011 by ESL Music.

== Track listing ==
1. "Web of Deception" - 4:33
2. "Culture of Fear" (featuring Mr. Lif) – 3:12
3. "Take My Soul" (featuring Lou Lou) – 3:51
4. "Light Flares" – 3:01
5. "Stargazer" (featuring Sleepy Wonder) – 3:45
6. "Where It All Starts" (featuring Lou Lou) – 3:21
7. "Tower Seven" – 7:48
8. "Is It Over?" (featuring Shana Halligan) – 3:22
9. "False Flag Dub" (featuring Ras Puma) – 3:05
10. "Safar (The Journey)" (featuring Lou Lou) – 1:43
11. "Fragments" – 4:11
12. "Overstand" (featuring Ras Puma) – 3:40
13. "Free" (featuring Kota) – 4:03

== Personnel ==
=== Vocals ===
- Tamara Wellons (1)
- Mr. Lif (2)
- Lou Lou Ghelichkhani (3, 6, 10)
- Sleepy Wonder (5)
- Shana Halligan (8)
- Chris "Ras Puma" Smith (9, 12)
- Sylvia Bernice Eberhardt (13)

=== Instrumentation ===
- Bass: Ashish Vyas (1, 3, 5, 7, 9)
- Guitar: Robbie Myers (1, 2, 3), Federico Aubele (6), Jeff "Jahlex" Alexander (13)
- Keys: Will Rast (1, 2, 3), Darrell Burke (5, 12)
- Percussion: Jeff Franca (1, 2, 3, 5, 10, 11, 12, 13)
- Drums: Jeff Franca (2, 12, 13), Andrew Black (2)
- Horns: Dave Finnell (2, 7, 12), Frank Mitchell Jr. (2, 7, 12)
- Organ: Will Rast (12)
- Melodica: Jeff Franca (10, 13)
- All other instruments by Eric Hilton and Rob Garza.

== Charts ==
=== Weekly charts ===
Weekly chart performance for Culture of Fear
Chart (2011)	Peak position
Canadian Albums (Nielsen SoundScan)	49
New Zealand Albums (RMNZ)	39
Swiss Albums (Schweizer Hitparade)	52
UK Dance Albums (Official Charts)	23
UK Independent Albums (Official Charts)	39
US Billboard 200	52
US Independent Albums (Billboard)	7
US Top Dance Albums (Billboard)	3

=== Year-end charts ===
Year-end chart performance for Culture of Fear
Chart (2011)	Position
US Top Dance/Electronic Albums (Billboard)	24
