= Notch (musician) =

American musician

- Born: Norman Howell; May 11, 1973 (age 53)
- Origin: Hartford, Connecticut, United States
- Genres: Reggae, R&B, dancehall, reggaeton
- Occupations: Singer, songwriter
- Years active: 1990–present
- Label: Delicious Vinyl/Eastwest Records

Norman Howell (born May 11, 1973), better known as Notch, is an American R&B, reggae, dancehall, and reggaeton artist. He was the former lead vocalist and one of the creative forces behind the hip-hop/reggae group Born Jamericans.

He is known for his 2001 chart topper, "Nuttin Nuh Go So." He has featured on albums such as Mas Flow 2, Mas Flow 2.5, Chosen Few II: El Documental, Barrio Fino, and The Cosmic Game. His first solo album, Raised by the People, was released in May 2007.

== Biography ==
=== Early life ===
Howell was born in Hartford, Connecticut. His mother is of African-American, Native American, and Portuguese descent, however his brothers and sisters, from the same mother but different father, are of Puerto Rican and African-American descent. His father was born in Jamaica and is of Afro-Cuban and French descent. Howell's parents separated when he was still an infant. He spent his early years with his mother, living in Hartford, Connecticut. Howell grew up in a multicultural neighborhood and learned Spanish because most of his friends at that time were of Hispanic descent. He left Connecticut to live with his father in Washington, D.C., when he was nine years old. Notch also spent a short time in Bermuda before moving back to Washington, D.C., where he lived until his early twenties.

=== Career ===
Notch is fluent in American English, Jamaican Patois, and Spanish. He mixes all three dialects and languages in some songs, a mixture he calls "Spatoinglish". Notch has worked with Daddy Yankee, Luny Tunes, Julio Voltio, Baby Ranks, Thievery Corporation, Sublime, Pitbull, T-Weaponz, and Rascalz.

Notch has provided vocals on several Thievery Corporation songs, including the title track of The Richest Man in Babylon, "Amerimacka", "Blasting Through the City" and "Strike the Root". Four songs also appear on Thievery's Corporation's "The Temple of I & I" including "Strike the Root," "True Sons of Zion," "Weapons of Distraction," and "Drop Your Guns."

== Discography ==
=== Born Jamericans ===
- "Boom Shak-a-Tack" (1994)
- "Cease & Seckle" (1994)
- Kids from Foreign (1994)
- Yardcore (1997)

=== Solo work ===
Raised by the People

Studio album by Notch
- Released: May 22, 2007
- Recorded: 2006/2007
- Genres: Reggaeton; Hip hop
- Labels: Cinco Por Cinco Records; Machete Music
- Producer: Supa Dups

- Raised by the People (2007)
  1. Intro/ Hay Que Bueno
  2. Dale Pa' Tra (Back It Up)
  3. Algarete
  4. Guaya Guaya
  5. Que Te Pica
  6. Layaway Love
  7. Layaway Love Remix (feat. Fatman Scoop)
  8. Rosalinda
  9. Traemelo
  10. Tocame
  11. Más De Ti
  12. Ella Se Fue
  13. Castigo
  14. No Problema
  15. Jah Mexi Cali
  16. Mano y Mano
  17. Verme (Remix) - (with Baby Ranks & Jabba)
  18. Chévere (Remix) - (with Voltio)
  19. Bailar Reggae
  20. Bun Out Bad Mind
  21. Hay Que Bueno
  22. Tú 'Tá Loco
