= Versions (Thievery Corporation album) =

Remix album by Thievery Corporation
- Released: May 16, 2006
- Genre: Trip hop; electronica
- Length: 75:57
- Label: Eighteenth Street Lounge

Thievery Corporation chronology
The Cosmic Game (2005)	Versions (2006)	Radio Retaliation (2008)

Professional ratings
Review scores
Source	Rating
AllMusic	3.5/5 stars
Okayplayer	4/5 stars

Versions is an album by Thievery Corporation, released in May 2006. The album consists of a collection of rare remixes done by Thievery Corporation, largely of other artists' material, and the original Thievery Corporation track, "Originality".

== Track listing ==
1. "Tarana" by Ustad Sultan Khan – 4:40 (originally released in 1976)
2. "Habaños Days" by Damian Draghici – 4:22 (originally released in 2004)
3. "This Is Not a Love Song" by Nouvelle Vague – 4:33 (originally released in 2004)
4. "Beloved" by Anoushka Shankar – 4:23 (originally released in 2005)
5. "Who Needs Forever" by Astrud Gilberto – 4:12 (originally released in 1966)
6. "Desert" by Emilie Simon – 3:13 (originally released in 2002)
7. "Lemon Tree" by Herb Alpert – 3:38 (originally released in 1965)
8. "Originality" featuring Sister Nancy – 4:08 (previously unreleased)
9. "In Love" by Fear of Pop – 4:39 (originally released in 1998)
10. "The Girl's Insane" by The Januaries – 4:27 (originally released in 2000)
11. "Strange Days" by The Doors – 4:23 (originally released in 1967)
12. "Revolution Solution" (TC Remix) – 3:50 (previously unreleased but original song released in 2004)
13. "Shiva" (TC Remix) – 4:49 (previously unreleased but original song released in 2004)
14. "Khalghi Stomp" by Transglobal Underground – 3:54 (originally released in 2004)
15. "Angels" by Wax Poetic featuring Norah Jones – 4:39 (originally released in 2003)
16. "Nothing to Lose" by Isabelle Antena – 2:56 (originally released in 2004)
17. "Cada Beijo" by Bebel Gilberto – 4:19 (originally released in 2004)
18. "Dirty Little Secret" by Sarah McLachlan – 4:52 (originally released in 2003)

== Charts ==
Chart performance for Versions
Chart (2006)	Peak position
Belgian Albums (Ultratop Flanders)	56
Italian Albums (FIMI)	26
US Independent Albums (Billboard)	19
US Top Dance/Electronic Albums (Billboard)	7
