= Saudade (Thievery Corporation album) =

Studio album by Thievery Corporation
- Released: March 25, 2014
- Recorded: 2014
- Genres: Bossa nova; Latin jazz; lounge
- Length: 42:10
- Label: ESL Music
- Producer: Christopher "Stone" Garrett

Thievery Corporation chronology
Culture of Fear (2011)	Saudade (2014)	The Temple of I & I (2017)

Saudade (Portuguese for "Longing") is the seventh studio album by Washington DC electronica duo Thievery Corporation released in 2014 via their Eighteenth Street Lounge Music label.

Eric Hilton, the band's co-founder, called Saudade his favorite Thievery album, saying "it's one of the more unusual records by an electronic music artist. I don't think any other electronic music artist would make a record like that one."

== Critical reception ==
Professional ratings
Review scores
Source	Rating
AllMusic	3/5 stars
The Australian	4.5/5 stars
Clash	5/10
Consequence of Sound	C
The Observer	3/5 stars
Record Collector	3/5 stars
Spectrum Culture	3.25/5 stars
Spin	2/10
The Upcoming	3/5 stars

Saudade was lukewarmly received by most reviewers, with outliers included a critic from The Australian that called it "a complex, sensual release paying homage to bossa nova but containing a contemporary edge injected by two who know how to push boundaries in style," and a two-out-of-ten Spin magazine review, published on April 1, 2014, that consisted entirely of a portion of a Wikipedia article about Sushi. Record Collector called the album "as light and refreshing as Brazilian lemonade," praising the use of "international players who know their cassavas." AllMusic's David Jeffries wrote the album had "a fine set of wistful tunes and suitable, alluring singers" but was a mixed bag in terms of mixing that made the bossa nova tracks more "hot" than "warm."

== Commercial performance ==
In the United States, Saudade sold 7,000 copies in its first week, leading it to debut at number-two on the country's Billboard Top Dance/Electronic Albums chart; this led the group to tie with Dutch producer Armin van Buuren at fifth-place for the most top-ten hits on the chart at nine albums.

== Track listing ==
1. "Décollage" (featuring Lou Lou Ghelichkhani) – 3:23
2. "Meu Nêgo" (featuring Karina Zeviani) – 3:21
3. "Quem Me Leva" (featuring Elin Melgarejo) – 3:29
4. "Firelight" (featuring Lou Lou Ghelichkhani) – 3:33
5. "Sola in Città" (featuring Elin Melgarejo) – 2:27
6. "No More Disguise" (featuring Lou Lou Ghelichkhani) – 3:28
7. "Saudade"
8. "Claridad" (featuring Natalia Clavier) – 3:44
9. "Nós Dois" (featuring Karina Zeviani) – 3:03
10. "Le Coeur" (featuring Lou Lou Ghelichkhani) – 3:04
11. "Para Sempre" (featuring Elin Melgarejo) – 2:58
12. "Bateau Rouge" (featuring Lou Lou Ghelichkhani) – 4:09
13. "Depth of My Soul" (featuring Shana Halligan) – 3:23

== Personnel ==
=== Vocals ===
- Lou Lou Ghelichkhani (1,4,6,10,12)
- Karina Zeviani (2,9)
- Elin Melgarejo (3,5,11)
- Natalia Clavier (8)
- Shana Halligan (13)

=== Instrumentation ===
- Bass – Conrado Bokoles, Eric Hilton, Federico Aubele, Justin Parrott
- Drums – Jeff Franca, Mike Lowery
- Guitar – Conrado Bokoles, Federico Aubele, Mateo Monk, Rob Garza
- Horns – Frank Mitchell, Jr.
- Keyboards – Enea Diotaiuti, Rob Garza
- Percussion – Jeff Franca, Roberto Santos
- Strings – Columbia Heights Ensemble
- All other instruments by Eric Hilton and Rob Garza

== Charts ==
Chart performance for Saudade
Chart (2014)	Peak position
Belgian Albums (Ultratop Flanders)	51
Belgian Albums (Ultratop Wallonia)	185
Portuguese Albums (AFP)	15
UK Albums (Official Charts)	78
UK Independent Albums (Official Charts)	14
US Billboard 200	58
US Independent Albums (Billboard)	15
US Top Dance Albums (Billboard)	2
