= The Cosmic Game =

Studio album by Thievery Corporation
- Released: February 22, 2005
- Recorded: December 2003 – November 2004
- Studios: The Consulate, Washington, DC
- Genres: Lounge; dub; trip hop; downtempo
- Length: 62:42
- Label: ESL
- Producers: Rob Garza; Eric Hilton

Thievery Corporation chronology
The Richest Man in Babylon (2002)	The Cosmic Game (2005)	Versions (2006)

Professional ratings
Aggregate scores
Source	Rating
Metacritic	70/100
Review scores
Source	Rating
AllMusic	4/5 stars
Pitchfork	7.6/10
Rolling Stone	3/5 stars

The Cosmic Game is the fourth studio album by American electronic music duo Thievery Corporation, released on February 22, 2005, by ESL Music. After the success of their previous album The Richest Man in Babylon (2002), the guest artists on The Cosmic Game are of higher profile. The album features various styles of music including club, future-bossa, breaks, rock, and more.

The album debuted at number 74 on the UK Albums Chart, and has sold over 151,000 copies in the United States.

== Track listing ==
No.	Title	Featuring	Length
1.	"Marching the Hate Machines (Into the Sun)"	Wayne Coyne	4:01
2.	"Warning Shots"	Sleepy Wonder and Gunjan	5:02
3.	"Revolution Solution"	Perry Farrell	3:41
4.	"The Cosmic Game"		2:19
5.	"Satyam Shivam Sundaram"	Gunjan	4:07
6.	"Amerimacka"	Notch	5:41
7.	"Ambicion Eterna"	Verny Varela	3:43
8.	"Pela Janela"	Gigi Rezende	3:41
9.	"Sol Tapado"	Patrick de Santos	3:57
10.	"The Heart's a Lonely Hunter"	David Byrne	4:03
11.	"Holographic Universe"		3:42
12.	"Doors of Perception"	Gunjan	3:16
13.	"Wires and Watchtowers"	Sista Pat	4:19
14.	"The Supreme Illusion"	Gunjan	4:10
15.	"The Time We Lost Our Way"	LouLou Ghelichkhani	4:11
16.	"A Gentle Dissolve"		2:49

== Charts ==
=== Weekly charts ===
Weekly chart performance for The Cosmic Game
Chart (2005)	Peak position
Australian Albums (ARIA)	46
Austrian Albums (Ö3 Austria)	48
Belgian Albums (Ultratop Flanders)	25
Belgian Albums (Ultratop Wallonia)	71
Canadian Albums (Nielsen SoundScan)	41
French Albums (SNEP)	66
German Albums (Offizielle Top 100)	50
Italian Albums (FIMI)	25
New Zealand Albums (RMNZ)	24
Swiss Albums (Schweizer Hitparade)	79
UK Albums (Official Charts)	74
UK Dance Albums (Official Charts)	21
UK Independent Albums (Official Charts)	8
US Billboard 200	94
US Independent Albums (Billboard)	6
US Top Dance Albums (Billboard)	1

=== Year-end charts ===
Year-end chart performance for The Cosmic Game
Chart (2005)	Position
US Top Dance/Electronic Albums (Billboard)	7
