= Delights of the Garden =

Studio album by Desmond Williams
- Released: March 19, 2002
- Recorded: 2000–2002
- Genres: Downtempo, dub, bossa nova
- Length: 1:04:08
- Label: Eighteenth Street Lounge Music
- Producer: Desmond Williams

Desmond Williams chronology
Theme from a Dream (2000)	Delights of the Garden (2002)	East West Highway (2003)

Professional ratings
Review scores
Source	Rating
AllMusic	4/5 stars
IMPACT Press	(favorable)

Delights of the Garden is the 2002 debut album by Desmond Williams. On his first full album, Williams delves into his Jamaican roots, tinging the electronica sound of his music with the dub stylings of that nation. He also shifts through other styles, such as bossa nova, soul, and drum & bass.

Guest artists on the album included vocals by Portia Joo and performances by Javier Miranda on congas, Chris Vrenios on guitar, and Niv on scratching. Williams played all of the instruments on all of the tracks except for Um Favor (congas by Miranda), Theme from a Dream (guitar by Vrenios), and This Morning (dj scratching by Niv).

The album was recorded at the Eighteenth Street Lounge studios in Washington, D.C., and mastered at Masterdisc in New York City.

== Track listing ==
All tracks written by Desmond Williams.

1. "Um Favor" – 5:27
2. "Cadence" – 4:42
3. "First Touch" – 5:01
4. "Theme From a Dream" – 5:00
5. "This Morning" – 4:38
6. "Dread A the Roughest" – 4:32
7. "Spy Glass" – 4:33
8. "Saturday" – 1:19
9. "Delights of the Garden" – 5:49
10. "Oxygen" – 4:35
11. "High Speed Drift" – 4:50
12. "For the Trees" – 4:02
13. "Brooklyn Blues" – 4:57
14. "Wilcher Waltz" – 4:43

== Personnel ==
- Desmond Williams – bass, guitar, keyboards, producer, beats
- Portia Joo - vocals
- Javier Miranda - congas
- T. Austin Reed - keyboards
- Chris Pupa Roots Vrenios – guitar
- Steve Raskin – art direction, design
- Howie Weinberg – mastering
- The Williams Family – photography
