= T Power =

British musician

T Power (born Marc Royal) is an English drum and bass producer from Bow, London. Originally starting his production career in the UK hardcore scene, he moved into jungle. He was signed to drum and bass/jungle record label Botchit and Scarper. Wanting to avoid the increasing politics within the scene, he began to produce experimental drum and bass, culminating in the album, The Self Evident Truth of an Intuitive Mind. Following from this, came the next album Waveform. Less accessible, it carried his experimental tracks further into the left field.

Partnering with Shy FX, he released the album Long Time Dead, which featured vocals and electric violin by Ysanne Spevack and also started a record label named Digital Soundboy.

T Power was one half of the duo Chocolate Weasel, with Chris Stevens. They released the single "Music for Body Lockers", and then a funk and hip-hop album called Spaghettification in 1998.

In 2004, in collaboration with fellow producer Andre Williams, Royal issued a couple of singles billed as 'Ebony Dubsters'.

== Discography ==
=== Albums ===
- The Self Evident Truth of an Intuitive Mind (1995)
- Waveform (1996)
- Long Time Dead (2000)

=== Singles ===
Year	Title	UK Singles Chart	Billed as
1996	"Police State"	No. 63	T Power
2002	"Shake Ur Body"	No. 7	Shy FX and T Power featuring Di
2002	"Don't Wanna Know"	No. 19	Shy FX and T Power featuring Di and Skibadee
2003	"Feelin' U"	No. 34	Shy FX and T Power featuring Kele Le Roc
2004	"Murderation"	No. 59	Ebony Dubsters
2004	"Number 1" / "The Ritual"	No. 58	Ebony Dubsters
