= Lebanese Blonde =

Single by Thievery Corporation

from the album The Mirror Conspiracy / Symphonik
- Released: 1998 / 2020
- Genre: Lounge
- Length: 4:48
- Label: 4AD
- Songwriter(s): Rob Garza; Eric Hilton
- Producer(s): Rob Garza; Eric Hilton

"Lebanese Blonde" is a 1998 single released by the Thievery Corporation and later added to their 2000 album The Mirror Conspiracy. It was also featured on the soundtrack to Zach Braff's 2004 film Garden State. It features Pam Bricker on vocals. The title refers to Lebanese hashish.

A new version, notably different and remastered was released on Thievery Corporation's 2020 vinyl EP Symphonik with Elin Melgarejo replacing Pam Bricker on vocals.

== Track listings ==
=== Standard release ===
1. "Lebanese Blonde" (Original) - 5:00
2. "Coming From The Top" - 4:54

=== Maxi release ===
This was released in the French market by the label Labels.

1. "Lebanese Blonde" (Original) - 5:00
2. "Coming From The Top" - 4:54
3. "One" - 4:47
4. "Lebanese Blonde" (French) - 5:00
5. "Halfway Around The World" - 3:21
6. "Elise Affair" - 4:54
7. "Encounter In Bahia" - 6:11
8. "Lebanese Blonde" (Instrumental) - 5:05

== Charts ==
Chart performance for "Lebanese Blonde"
Chart (1998)	Peak position
UK Singles (OCC)	96
