= Anqui =

Norwegian Musical artist based in Barcelona

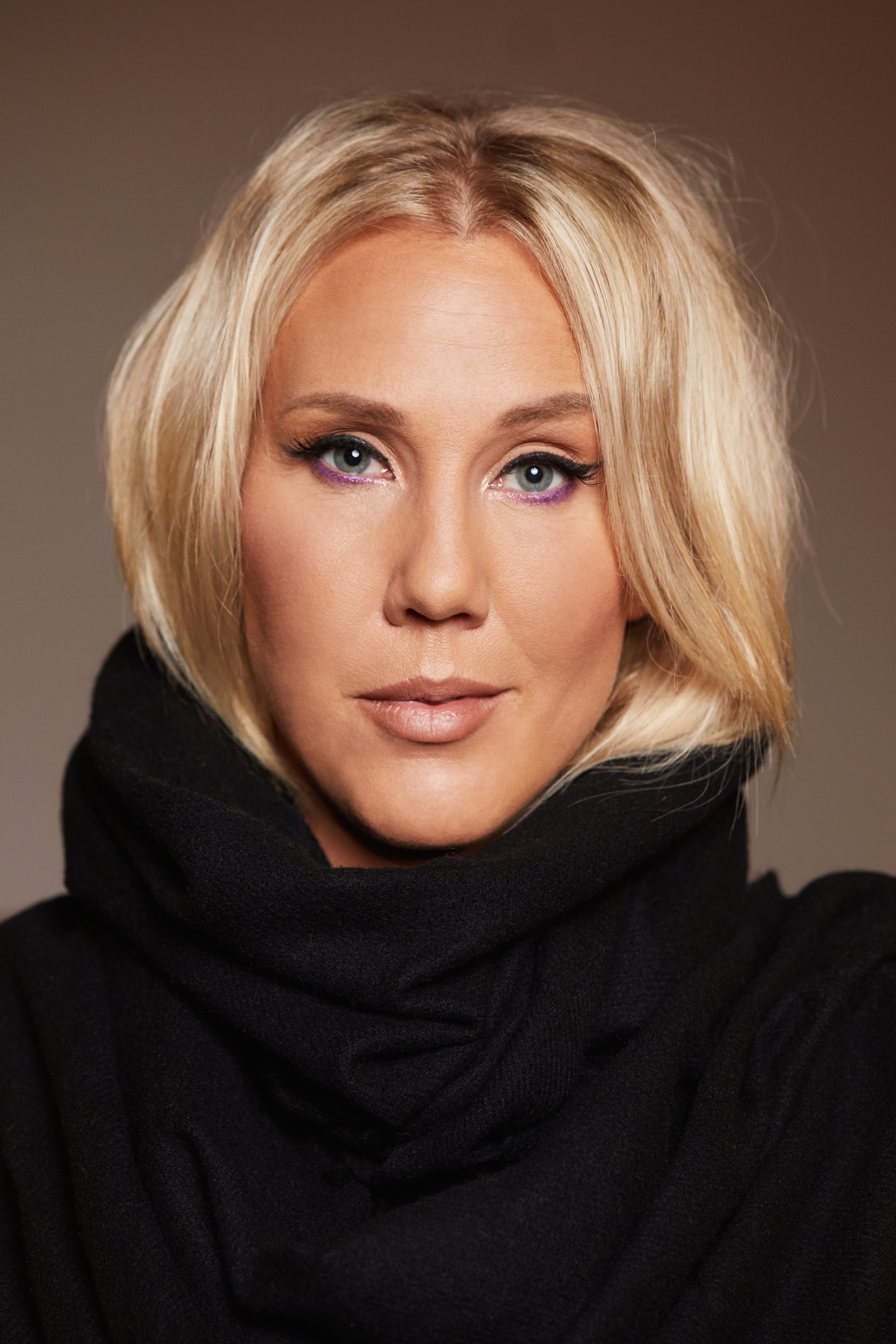
- Born: April 24, 1986 (age 39); Oslo, Norway
- Citizenship: Spain
- Occupations: Songwriter-singer, model, musician
- Musical career
- Genres: Pop; R&B; Jazz; Soul; Hip hop
- Labels: Warner, Vale, Sony
- Website: www.anqui.net

Ann Christin Krøgenes (born; April 24, 1986 in Holmlia, Oslo) known by her artist name Anqui (Ancì), is a Barcelona-based Norwegian musician, model, songwriter-singer, and activist. Anqui was a finalist in 2003 NRK Urørt award and won Best Newcomer award at By:Larm.

== Biography ==
Anqui was born in Oslo (Norway) in 1986 and started singing, composing and performing from early on, being a songwriter finalist for 2003 NRK Urørt. At 17, she won Best Newcomer Award at By:Larm.

Anqui moved to Barcelona (Spain) in 2005. Her first EPs, such as Turn My Clock, were all released on vinyl, the most notable one being Do What – an electro swing EP released twice on vinyl, compiled by Saint-Germain-des-Prés Café and distributed internationally.

Anqui was active in the Spanish house music scene between 2006 and 2011, reaching the national radio charts on Máxima FM, which lead to her tracks being included in several of Máxima FM's annual CD compilations containing their most played songs (Vol. 6, Vol. 8 and Vol. 12) released on Vale Music. During the same time period, her tracks were also picked up by several other minor house music compilations

Her participation in the Spanish hip hop collective Chacho Brodas between 2010 and 2013 brought her on tour in Spain (Sònar, BAM, MMVV, Viña Rock, En Vivo among others) playing an essential part as singer, rapper and songwriter on their album Prozak released on Warner Music Spain. This earned her a spot as one of very few female artists in the Spanish hip hop scene at the time.

From 2015 to 2020 Anqui focused on her solo career, releasing futuristic R&B singles Rude Girls and Yung Bwoi, but kept collaborating with different producers and released Find Love along with a self written and co-produced music video focused on social prejudice. Her songs has been listed on rotation by different national and international radio stations.

== Discography ==
- Light My Eyes feat. Anqui EP (2005) – Amo & Navas. Mentes Inquietas / Fresco Records.
- Beat Generation feat. Anqui EP (2007) – Amo & Navas. Mentes Inquietas / Fresco Records.
- Heart Beat feat. Anqui EP (2009) – Amo & Navas. Mentes Inquietas / Fresco Records.
- Turn My Clock feat. Anqui EP (2011) – Debilos. Molts Records.
- Do What feat. Anqui EP (2011) – The Jivers. Jazz & Milk.
- This Is The Last Time I Shake Your Hand (Medicina Remix) feat. Anqui (2011) – TSOFW. Irregular.
- Prozak (2012) – Chacho Brodas. Warner Music Spain.
- Mic Masters feat. Chyno Nyno, Anqui 78 (2015) – Tote King. Sony Music Enterprises España.
- Rude Girls EP (2015) – Anqui. Delpalo Records.
- Yung Bwoi EP (2016) – Anqui. Girl In A Suitcase.
- Be My King feat. Anqui Super Soft (2017) – Fast Boo. Little Red Corvette Records.
- Find Love feat Anqui Single (2017) – InnerCut. Artist Intelligence Agency.
- Don't Make Me feat. Anqui Single (2018) – DJ Soak. People.
- Hsp feat. Anqui Single (2020) – Habe.

== See also ==
- Sissy Wish
