= The Mirror Conspiracy =

Studio album by Thievery Corporation
- Released: April 2, 2000
- Recorded: 1997–2000
- Genre: Lounge; trip hop; chillout
- Length: 49:00
- Label: ESL
- Producer: Rob Garza; Eric Hilton

Thievery Corporation chronology
DJ-Kicks: Thievery Corporation (1999)	The Mirror Conspiracy (2000)	The Richest Man in Babylon (2002)

Alternate physical release cover
- Alternate artwork

Professional ratings
Review scores
Source	Rating
AllMusic	4/5 stars
Christgau's Consumer Guide	(2-star Honorable Mention)
The Encyclopedia of Popular Music	3/5 stars
Pitchfork	7.2/10
Rolling Stone	3.5/5 stars

The Mirror Conspiracy is the second studio album by American electronic music duo Thievery Corporation, released in 2000 by ESL Music and 4AD. All the songs on the album were written, recorded and produced by Rob Garza and Eric Hilton, although Pam Bricker contributed vocals to "Air Batucada", "The Mirror Conspiracy" and "Lebanese Blonde".

The Mirror Conspiracy is the duo's best-selling album in the United States, selling over 224,000 units to date, according to Nielsen SoundScan.

== Track listing ==
1. "Treasures" – 2:24 (vocals by Brother Jack, percussion by Roberto Berimbao)
2. "Le Monde" – 3:11 (with LouLou Ghelichkhani) (vocals by LouLou Ghelichkhani, guitar by Chris Vreinos)
3. "Indra" – 5:22
4. "Lebanese Blonde" – 4:48 (with Pam Bricker) (vocals by Pam Bricker, sitar by Rob Myers, horns by Rick Harris, percussion by Roberto Berimbao)
5. "Focus on Sight" – 3:47 (vocals by SEE-I, guitar and bass by Desmond Williams)
6. "Air Batucada" – 4:46 (with Pam Bricker) (vocals by Pam Bricker)
7. "Só com você" – 2:47 (with Bebel Gilberto) (vocals by Bebel Gilberto)
8. "Samba Tranquille" – 3:06
9. "Shadows of Ourselves" – 3:37 (with LouLou Ghelichkhani) (vocals by LouLou Ghelichkhani, guitar by Chris Vreinos, additional Keyboards by Desmond Williams, horns by Mike Thomas and Zack Grady)
10. "The Hong Kong Triad" – 3:01 (guitar by Chris Vreinos)
11. "Illumination" – 4:38
12. "The Mirror Conspiracy" – 3:45 (with Pam Bricker) (vocals by Pam Bricker, Percussion by Roberto Berimbao)
13. "Tomorrow" – 3:43
14. "Barrio Alto" – 3:54 (only available on 2000 reissue) (guitar by Ramon Gonzalez)
15. "A Guide for I and I" – 3:58 (only available on 2000 reissue) (vocals by Plejah)

== Charts ==
Chart performance for The Mirror Conspiracy
Chart (2000)	Peak position
Australian Albums (ARIA)	56
Austrian Albums (Ö3 Austria)	48
Dutch Albums (Album Top 100)	80
French Albums (SNEP)	45
German Albums (Offizielle Top 100)	32
Italian Albums (FIMI)	26
New Zealand Albums (RMNZ)	22
UK Albums (OCC)	76
US Independent Albums (Billboard)	28

== Release history ==
Release history for The Mirror Conspiracy
Region	Date
United States	April 2, 2000 (original)
United Kingdom	August 21, 2000
Portugal	August 22, 2000
United States	August 22, 2000 (re-issue)
Australia	2000
Austria	2000
Argentina	2000
Benelux	2000
Canada	2000
France	2000
United States	2002 (re-issue)
Russia	2004
United States	September 30, 2014 (re-issue)
