= The Line of Beauty (TV series) =

2006 television serial by Saul Dibb

- Genre: Drama
- Based on: The Line of Beauty by Alan Hollinghurst
- Written by: Andrew Davies
- Directed by: Saul Dibb
- Composer: Martin Phipps
- Country of origin: United Kingdom
- Original language: English
- No. of series: 1
- No. of episodes: 3 (list of episodes)

Production
- Executive producers: Laura Mackie; Hilary Salmon
- Producer: Kate Lewis
- Cinematography: David Odd
- Running time: 60 minutes

Original release
- Network: BBC Two; BBC HD
- Release: 17 May – 31 May 2006

The Line of Beauty is a British drama television serial that was first broadcast on BBC Two on 17 May 2006. The three-part series, written by Andrew Davies and directed by Saul Dibb, is an adaptation of the 2004 novel of the same name by Alan Hollinghurst.

== Cast ==
- Dan Stevens as Nick Guest
- Tim McInnerny as Gerald Fedden
- Hayley Atwell as Catherine Fedden
- Alice Krige as Rachel Fedden
- Carmen du Sautoy as Elena
- Alex Wyndham as Antoine 'Wani' Ouradi
- James Bradshaw as Polly Tompkins
- Oliver Coleman as Toby Fedden
- Lydia Leonard as Penny Kent
- Don Gilet as Leo Charles
- Christopher Fairbank as Barry Groom
- Oscar James as Brentford
- John Warnaby as Badger
- John Standing as Lord Kessler
- Siri Svegler as Martine
- Nikki Amuka-Bird as Rosemary Charles
- Justin Salinger as Russel
- Caroline Blakiston as Lady Partridge
- Julia St. John as Greta Timms
- David Yelland as John Timms
- John Quayle as Geoffrey Titchfield
- Bruno Lastra as Tristao
- Tom Knight as Norman Kent

== Episode list ==
No.	Title	Directed by	Written by	Original release date	UK viewers (millions)
1	"The Love Chord"	Saul Dibb	Andrew Davies	17 May 2006	2.16
Nick Guest, a recent Oxford graduate from a middle-class family, is invited to stay in the home of his best friend, Toby Fedden, son of Conservative MP Gerald Fedden, while the family, minus their bipolar daughter Cat, are out on holiday in France. Nick is asked by Toby's mother, Rachel, to keep an eye on Cat, who has a history of self-harm. Not long after the rest of the Feddens are gone, Cat has a minor episode, but after Nick helps her, she begs him to not contact her parents and he agrees. They quickly form a close friendship, and when the Feddens return, Rachel is so impressed by how well Nick and Cat have bonded that she insists Nick stays on as a permanent lodger. This arrangement gives Nick an insider's view of life in upper-class English society. With Cat's assistance, Nick meets Leo, with whom he falls in love, but Leo soon breaks up with Nick to go back to his ex Pete, who is starting to show symptoms of AIDS before the condition is widely known. Guest starring: Elize du Toit, Robin Kermode, Richard Lintern, Garrick Hagon and Floella Benjamin
2	"To Whom Do You Beautifully Belong"	Saul Dibb	Andrew Davies	24 May 2006	1.53
Now fully integrated into the Fedden family, Nick has become involved with another friend from Oxford, Wani, the son of a rich Lebanese businessman, but the relationship had to be kept secret. Nick and Wani have started a magazine and film production company together, which becomes a convenient cover for their relationship. Nick's exposure to the lifestyles of the rich leads him to drugs and more hedonistic behaviour. Nick accompanies Gerald to Nick's home town of Barwick, and stumbles upon Gerald having sex with one of his secretaries. Later, the Feddens are again on holiday in France and this time invite Nick and Wani to join them. While there, things in the Fedden family become tense, with Cat becoming rebellious against her father's involvement with a shady investor and showing signs that she is no longer taking her meds, Nick becoming more open about his homosexuality, and Gerald all but telling Nick to remain silent about the affair. When everyone returns to England, the Feddens have a party for Margaret Thatcher. Prior to the party Nick goes to a bar to get drugs, and while there sees his ex, Leo, who is showing symptoms of AIDS. Fearful, Nick avoids approaching Leo and quickly leaves the bar. At the party, Nick makes a strong impression with Thatcher by inviting her to dance and making the party a smashing success. Guest starring: Peter Needham, Virgile Bramly, Adam Rayner, Ivana Gavrić, Andy Lucas, Joseph Morgan, Tanya Duff, Jessica Turner, Paul Butterworth, Lee Long, Albert Welling, Barbara Flynn, Kenneth Cranham, Graham Bohea, Ryan Simons and Kika Markham
3	"The End of the Street"	Saul Dibb	Andrew Davies	31 May 2006	1.70
The Tories are at the height of power with elections approaching. Leo's lesbian sister Rosemary arrives to Nick's office to inform him that Leo died from complications of AIDS, to let Nick know that Leo did have a special love for him, and to be sure that Nick hadn't become sick. Nick's boyfriend Wani, however, has contracted the disease. Eventually his condition causes the relationship to end and their mutual business ventures to falter. Not long after the elections in which Gerald wins another term, his affair and his dealings with corrupt investors are exposed by the press, plunging him into a major financial scandal. They discover that the source is a fully manic Cat, who has long been off her medications and ran away from home. The magnitude of the scandal forces Gerald to resign in disgrace. Further scandal erupts when Nick's homosexuality is leaked, destroying his relationship with the Feddens. They question how he became integrated into their lives and project their anger about betrayal onto Nick, forcing him to move out of their house. While Nick was saying farewell to their housekeeper, with whom he thought he had a close bond from the four years of living there, she said that she knew he was no good from the moment she first laid eyes on him. Nick leaves the Feddens a broken man with an uncertain future. Guest starring: Rosie Fellner, Keeley Forsyth, Michael N. Harbour, John Banks, Trevor White, Jake Broder, Luis Soto, Max Cane, Tracy Wiles, Stephen Hogan, Georgie Glen, Sarah Mowat, Des Hamilton and Tim Elliott

== Reception ==
The Independent called the series an "intelligent, properly grown-up drama." Matt Wells of The Guardian said it was a "creative flop" and "it exposed how poorly the BBC serves gay viewers." Sam Wollaston, also writing for The Guardian, praised the series and called it "wonderful". Rupert Smith, also with The Guardian, said it was a "masterclass in storytelling - but surely there was more to the 1980s than a few posh people with glossy hair?"

== Home media ==
The DVD edition was released on 31 July 2006.
