= Federico Aubele =

Argentine singer-songwriter

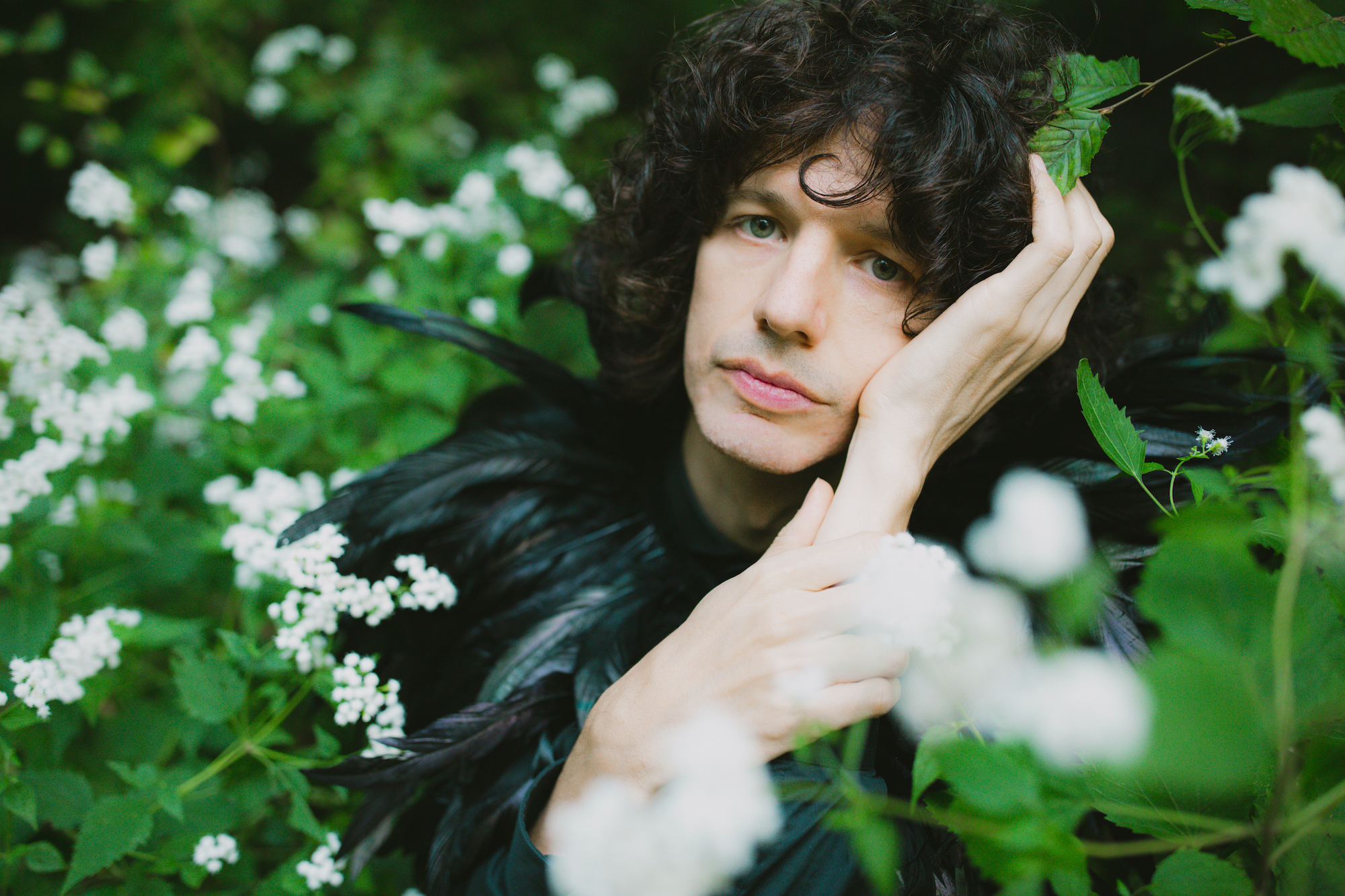

Background information
- Origin: Buenos Aires, Argentina
- Years active: 2004–present
- Labels: Eighteenth Street Lounge Music; 13Records

Federico Aubele is an Argentine singer-songwriter whose music blends various genres and styles.

== Biography ==
Born and raised in Buenos Aires, Aubele started playing music at age 12. He moved to Berlin in 2002, where he lived for several years. After submitting a demo via email to Thievery Corporation's Eighteenth Street Lounge Music, he was signed quickly to the label. He released his debut album Gran Hotel Buenos Aires, produced by Thievery Corporation, in 2004. In 2006, he played at the Austin City Limits Music Festival. His song "Esta Noche" was featured in the fifth season of Alias (episode 8) and Season One episode 10 of Franklin & Bash. "La Esquina" was featured in the 2007 movie The Take, starring John Leguizamo.

After Berlin, he moved to Barcelona, where he began working on his new album, Panamericana (a title to indicate the many musical influences and in part named after the Pan-American Highway), which was released on 18 September 2007, also produced by Thievery Corporation. In 2009, he released Amatoria, a much more mellow album which featured a duet with Sabina Sciubba from Brazilian Girls and a collaboration with Miho Hatori. In late 2010, Aubele finished the self-produced album Berlin 13, which was released in March 2011, with a much stronger electronic music influence. His album 5, from 2013, featured the song "Somewhere Else," a duet with jazz chanteuse Melody Gardot.

In 2014, Nacional Records produced a 10th anniversary edition of Aubele's debut album Gran Hotel Buenos Aires, with a full North American tour. He now lives in Brooklyn, New York. In 2022, Federico released his sixth studio album, The Holographic Moon, ending a six-year hiatus. In 2023, Aubele released "Time Drips on my Bed"

== Performances ==
- Montreal Jazz Fest (2005, 2009)
- Lollapalooza (2009)
- Treasure Island Music Festival (2009)
- Austin City Limits Fest (2010, 2011)

== Discography ==
=== Albums ===
- Gran Hotel Buenos Aires (2004)
- Panamericana (2007)
- Amatoria (2009)
- Berlin 13 (2011)
- Five (22 October 2013)
- The Holographic Moon (2022)
- Time Drips on my Bed (2023)
