= The Karminsky Experience =

The Karminsky Experience Inc.
- Origin: London
- Genres: Downtempo; Trip hop
- Labels: ESL Records
- Members: James Munns, Martin Dingle
- Website: http://www.karminskyexperience.com/

The Karminsky Experience Inc. is a London-based DJ and recording artist duo consisting of James Munns and Martin Dingle. They formed in early 1990s, and had a long running, successful circuit of performances, in various night clubs throughout England. Their full-length debut, The Power of Suggestion, was released by the Eighteenth Street Lounge Music label in 2003.

They are best known for their LP releases of The Power of Suggestion and Snapshot, both of which were put out under the ESL Music label. Moving forward, they released their third album Beat! (2016) under a new label, Patterns of Behavior, and released a single "See Inside" (2018).

== Discography ==
=== Albums ===
- The Power of Suggestion (2003)
- Snapshot (2007)
- Beat! (2016)
