= Afrolicious =

American dance-fusion collective

- Origin: San Francisco, California, United States
- Genres: Afrobeat, dance-fusion, Latin sounds, funk, dub, electro
- Years active: 2007–present
- Labels: ESL Music, Afrolicious Music

Afrolicious is a dance-fusion collective based in San Francisco, California. Founded by brothers Joe "Pleasuremaker" McGuire and Oz "Señor Oz" McGuire, the group's weekly residency at the Elbo Room in the Mission District has established Afrolicious as an integral player in the San Francisco live music scene. At its core Afrolicious consists of a DJ duo, but has since expanded to include a live band with as many as twelve pieces as well as a project known as Afrolicious Soundsystem. In addition to its reputation for regular touring, Afrolicious has released two EPs as well as a full-length original album.

== History ==
Afrolicious began as a project of Joe "Pleasuremaker" McGuire to link different genres of the African diaspora. Originally from Kansas City, Missouri, multi-instrumentalist and DJ/producer Pleasuremaker followed his brother Oz in relocating to San Francisco in 2006. It was there that the brothers created a weekly party, known as Afrolicious, at the Mission District's Elbo Room. With their unofficial motto "It's a party, not a show", the weekly Afrolicious night at the Elbo Room became a breeding ground for the duo to scout out musicians for a new band. Soon the duo was collaborating with artists around the Bay Area music scene and writing original music under the name Afrolicious. By 2010 the band Afrolicious as it is known today had begun gelling together.

== Members ==
Afrolicious perform as a live band, as DJs (Pleasuremaker and Señor Oz), and as Afrolicious Soundsystem.

Afrolicious (live band)

- Pleasuremaker: Guitar, Keyboards, Vocals, Electronics
- Señor Oz: Electronics, Effects, Dubs, Noises, Vibes
- Wendell Rand: Bass player,
- Diamond Vibes: Percussion, Vocals leather pants
- Baba Duru: Vocals, Percussion
- Ziek McCarter: Vocals, keys
- Freshislife: Vocals
- Fabio Reis: Drums
- Paul Oliphant: Drums
- Will Magid: Trumpet
- Aaron Leibowitz: Tenor and Alto Sax
- Kate Pittard: Alto Sax and Bari Sax
- Alan Williams: Trombone
- Izzy Weizer: Bari Sax, Flute
- Zeb Early: Guitar

Guest vocalists and musicians

- Erica Chidi (recorded Vocals on 'Pleasure Power')
- Yacouba Diarra (recorded on Vocals and Ngoni and co-wrote 'A Dub for Mali' and 'Bade Malou')
- Red 'The Black Blond' (recorded vocals on 'Revolution')
- Frank Mitchell (recorded Sax on 'Pleasure Power', 'California Dreaming', 'Crazy', and 'Do What You Got to')
- Dave Finnell (recorded Trumpet on 'Pleasure Power', 'California Dreaming', 'Crazy', and 'Do What You Got to')

Afrolicious Soundsystem

- DJs Pleasuremaker and Señor Oz
- Diamond Vibes, Percussion

== Discography ==
Afrolicious' two EPs, released on ESL Music, were by produced by Rob Garza of Thievery Corporation. Their full-length debut original album, California Dreaming, was released in March 2013 on their own label, Afrolicious Music. In addition to the following releases, Afrolicious is loosely affiliated with a worldwide group of DJs, producers, bands, and labels who produce contemporary soulful dance music inspired by sounds of the African diaspora, including Antibalas, Chico Mann, Nickodemus, DJ Smash, Wonderwheel Recordings, Subsuelo, and Cumba Mela.

EPs

- Dub for Mali (2011), ESL Music
- Pleasuretime (2012), ESL Music

Full Length Album

- California Dreaming (2013), Afrolicious Music
