= DJ-Kicks: Kid Loco =

1999 compilation album

Compilation album by Kid Loco
- Released: 18 October 1999
- Recorded: n/a
- Genre: Electronica, Trip hop
- Length: 68:24
- Label: Studio !K7 !K7081CD - CD !K7081LP - LP

Kid Loco chronology
Prelude To A Grand Love Story (1999)	DJ-Kicks: Kid Loco (1999)	Kill Your Darlings (2001)

DJ-Kicks chronology
Thievery Corporation (1999)	Kid Loco (1999)	Stereo MCs (2000)

Professional ratings
Review scores
Source	Rating
Allmusic	2/5 stars

DJ-Kicks: Kid Loco is a DJ mix album, mixed by Kid Loco. An electronica record, it was released on 18 October 1999 on the Studio !K7 independent record label as part of the DJ-Kicks series.

== Track listing ==
1. "Don't You Know I'm Loco" - Kid Loco - 0:43
2. "Om Namah Shivaya" - The Bill Wells Octet vs. Future Pilot A.K.A. - 2:55
3. "Continuum" - The Cinematic Orchestra - 2:34
4. "Dark Light" (Underdog Mix) - Emperors New Clothes - 6:05
5. "Mr. Flakey" - The Ted Howler Rhythm Combo - 3:16
6. "Theme From Conquest Of The Irrational" (Remix By The Prunes) - DJ Vadim - 3:33
7. "Introspection" - Jazzanova - 5:17
8. "Dark Soul" - Common Ground - 4:44
9. "Blueski" - Underworld - 2:44
10. "Grimble" - Grantby - 2:44
11. "Jesus Christ Almighty" (Dunderhead and Pylon King Remix) - Deep Season - 3:56
12. "Happy Cycling" - Boards of Canada - 5:07
13. "One" - Pelding - 2:52
14. "Attitude Adjuster" - Tom Tyler - 5:47
15. "Culture Consumers" - Tongue - 3:39
16. "Lovesick" (Underdog Mix) - Lisa Germano - 3:01
17. "Slo Jo" - Stereotyp - 4:28
18. "Flyin' On 747" - Kid Loco - 4:59
