= Eric Hilton (music producer) =

American musician, DJ, and restaurateur

- Born: 1965 (age 60–61); Rockville, Maryland, U.S.
- Occupations: Music producer, musician, DJ, restaurateur
- Years active: 1995–present
- Known for: Co-founding Thievery Corporation and ESL Music
- Website: erichilton.com

Eric Hilton is an American music producer, musician, DJ, and restaurateur known for co-founding the electronic music group Thievery Corporation and the label ESL Music.

== Early life and education ==
Eric Hilton was born in 1965 in Rockville, Maryland.

He moved to downtown Washington, D.C. at the age of 18, where he began working as a DJ in local clubs and hosting parties in vacant warehouses.

== Career ==
=== Music ===
In 1995, Hilton formed Thievery Corporation with Rob Garza. The duo combines electronic rhythms with elements of bossa nova, hip-hop, Indian rock, and reggae, contributing to what has been described as a new style of ambient electronic music. They are considered to be the pioneers of Downtempo. Their work has been featured in various commercials, television shows, and films. Hilton's Washington, D.C. Eighteenth Street Lounge gained attention as a destination for visitors.

In addition to his work with Thievery Corporation, Hilton released his albums, Infinite Everywhere and The Impossible Silence in 2020, and another album, Ceremony, in 2021. He also co-produced Carry Me Home: A Reggae Tribute to Gil Scott-Heron & Brian Jackson with The Archives. In 2022, his solo album Lost Dialect was released. In 2023, he worked with Natalia Clavier to release another album titled Corazón Kintsugi.

In 2024, Hilton released two albums. The first, Sound Vagabond, was ranked #2 on the NACC Radio Charts in the Electronic category and #3 in the Chill category. That same year, Hilton debuted his first ambient album, Out of the Blur, which was created during a period of grief following the death of a close friend and engineer from a drug overdose, coinciding with Hilton's decision to pursue sobriety.

=== Restaurants and bars ===
Hilton began his career in the hospitality industry in 1995 by opening the Eighteenth Street Lounge in Washington, D.C. The lounge was located above a mattress shop and was known for its distinctive decor, specific admission policy, and the music by Thievery Corporation. The club closed in 2020.

Working independently and alongside his brother, Ian, Hilton subsequently opened multiple bars and restaurants across Washington, D.C., and Northern Virginia. These include Marvin, the Brixton, Satellite Room, American Ice Company, El Rey, the Gibson, Chez Billy Sud, and Cafe Colline.

Hilton's expansion into Northern Virginia has included versions of Cafe Colline and El Rey.

Outside of his hospitality work, he edited the low-budget film Babylon Central and has been involved in art spaces.
