= Ivana Gavrić =

British classical concert pianist

Ivana Gavrić (born June, 1980) is a British classical concert pianist. She was named Newcomer of the Year at the BBC Music Magazine Awards 2011. She is best known for her interpretations of works by Grieg and Janáček.

== Early life and education ==
The daughter of pianist Zrinka Gavrić (née Lukić), Ivana Gavrić was born in Sarajevo, Bosnia and Herzegovina and commenced her studies at the age of six at the Central Junior Music School of Sarajevo. Following her move to the UK in 1992, she attended The Latymer School and the Guildhall School of Music Junior Department, where she was awarded the Keyboard Prize, and studied with James Gibb She made her Royal Albert Hall solo debut in 1997.

She went on to read music at St Catharine's College, Cambridge University where she was an Instrumental Award Holder. She completed her Masters in Advanced Piano Performance with Distinction at the Royal College of Music, where she studied with Niel Immelman She furthered her studies with Peter Bithell and in masterclasses with Ferenc Rados, Dmitri Bashkirov, Menahem Pressler, Pascal Devoyon and Alexander Satz. She is an alumna of IMS Prussia Cove, Live Music Now and Britten Pears Young Artist Programme.

== Professional career ==
Gavrić made her Wigmore Hall solo début in July 2010.

In 2011, Gavrić curated a Janáček festival with Aurora Orchestra at London's King's Place.

Gavrić made her USA debut in 2013, performing at The Phillips Collection in Washington DC, and at The Gilmore Rising Star Series.

In 2014, Gavrić made her debut with the Royal Stockholm Philharmonic Orchestra with Rafael Payare (Rachmaninov Variations on a Theme by Paganini), the South Denmark Philharmonic with Christian Kluxen (Schumann and Mozart K271 'Jeunehomme') and the Trondheim Soloists (Mozart K271).

Gavrić made her Chinese debut in 2016 with recitals in Beijing, Shangai, Nanjing and Tianjin.

In 2018, Gavrić made her concerto debut at the Royal Albert Hall with the Royal Philharmonic Orchestra and David Hill (Beethoven Emperor Concerto), In 2019, she made her debut with the Philharmonia Orchestra with Christopher Warren-Green playing Rachmaninov Piano Concerto at The Royal Festival Hall. She was invited to return with Grieg Piano Concerto in 2022.

Gavrić has also performed as a soloist with the City of London Sinfonia (Bach F minor and Mendelssohn Double Concerto with Alexandra Wood), Camerata Zürich (Mendelssohn A minor), Liechtenstein Symphony Orchestra (Grieg) and Sarajevo Philharmonic (Mendelssohn G minor), and performed at festivals including the Davos Festival (2019), Musikdorf Ernen (2017), The Hay Festival (2015) and Cheltenham Festival (2021).

Gavrić made her South American debut in 2023 in Lima, Peru.

Gavrić has a longstanding collaboration with the British composer Cheryl Frances-Hoad, who has written a piano concerto for Gavrić 'Between the Skies, the Hills and the River', premiered in London and at the Berlin Konzerthaus in 2018 with Southbank Sinfonia (Sinfonia Smith Square), Karen Kendrickson and Simon Over. It was broadcast live on ARTE TV. Frances-Hoad also composed Homages to Janáček (In the Dew), Grieg (Contemplation), Schubert (Lullaby) and Ravel (Un canard hors de l'eau) for Gavrić. Frances-Hoad's In the Dew is now selected as part of the ABRSM Grade 8 piano syllabus 2025-6.

Gavrić taught on the Advanced Piano Course at Dartington International Summer School and Festival from 2021-2023, also performing as a soloist, concerto soloist and chamber musician.

Gavrić broadcasts regularly for BBC Radio 3, BBC Radio 4, Radio SRF2 and Espace 2 in Switzerland and Ö1 in Austria. Gavrić was a guest on Jess Gillam's 'This Classical Life' show on BBC Radio 3 in January 2026.

== Discography ==
* Throwback to Dance, Signum Classics, 2025 Works by Grieg, Ravel, Chaminade, Pejačević and Frances-Hoad.

* Origins, Rubicon Classics, 2019
With Southbank Sinfonia and Karin Hendrickson Haydn D major Concerto Frances-Hoad 'Between the Skies, the River and the Hills'

* Stolen Rhythm, Champs Hill Records, 2017

* Chopin, Edition Classics, 2017
Classic FM Drivetime album of the week

* Grieg: Piano Works, Champs Hill Records, 2013 Gramophone Editor's Choice and Grieg Society Record of the Year

* From the street, Champs Hill Records, 2011
Works by Janáček, Ravel and Prokofiev . "Outstanding" by International Record Review, 5 stars in BBC Music Magazine.

* In the mists, Champs Hill Records, 2010
Janáček, Schubert, Liszt and Rachmaninov
The CD was named Instrumental Choice of the Month by BBC Music Magazine, “outstanding” in International Record Review, and received four-star reviews in The Guardian, Independent on Sunday and The Telegraph. '*

- Breaking and Entering: Original Soundtrack, V2 Records, 2006'

== Awards ==
- BBC Music Magazine Newcomer of the Year 2011
- Grieg Society Recording of the Year for Grieg Piano Works album in 2015.
- Bernardo's Champion Child 1993, presented by Princess Diana

== On screen ==
Following an invitation from the Oscar-winning director Anthony Minghella, Gavrić performed solo Bach on the soundtrack of his film Breaking and Entering, produced by Oscar-winning composer Gabriel Yared and Underworld, recorded at Abbey Road Studios. Gavrić was also a hand double for Oscar-winning actress Juliette Binoche in the film.

Gavrić plays the role of pianist Nina Glaserova. in the BBC Two series The Line of Beauty, where she performs Beethoven and Chopin.

Gavriċ worked as a hand-double for actors in Midsommer Murders.

Gavrić represented St Catharine's College Cambridge at the Christmas Special Celebrity University Challenge
