= The Sweet Vandals =

Spanish vintage funk band

The Sweet Vandals are a vintage 60s and 70s funk band from Madrid. Their music was used in a Fiat Bravo television advert.

The Sweet Vandals were formed in Madrid in 2005. After a few gigs they recorded a 45 containing the song "I Got You Man" under the Funkorama label. The song was a success in the underground market and the band signed with Unique Records, a label from Germany. Their first album was released in 2007 and in 2008 was released in France by Differ-Ant. The band then toured extensively in Germany, France and more.

After the Fiat advert the band published their second album "Lovelite". More focused on raw soul, they played a live session for the BBC at Maida Vale Studios and Rockpalast, a live music show of the German WDR. They also played in many countries like Finland, Mexico, Portugal, Italy, Switzerland, Holland, Belgium, Uk, just to name a few.

In 2011 they release their latest work with Unique Records. Their third album "So Clear", with a more sophisticated production including a gospel choir, strings, electric pianos, etc. The band opened its influences with more jazz, soul, psychedelia and blues. They toured extensively in Spain for first time.

In 2012 they started working with their own label, "Sweet Records" and release several 45's before their fourth album, "After All" is released worldwide at the beginning of May 2013.

== Members ==
- Mayka Edjo: Lead Vocals (2005–present)
- Jose "Yusepe" Herranz: Guitar (2005–present)
- Santi "Sweetfingers" Martín: Bass (2005–present)
- Javi "Skunk": drums (2005–present)
- Santiago "Diamond" Vallejo: Hammond(2008–present)

past members:

- Carlo Coupé: Hammond (2005-2007)
- Julián Maeso: Hammond (2007-2008)

== Albums ==
Their self-titled debut album was released in 2007. The tracks were:

1. I Got You Man
2. Charlie's Love
3. Papa's Got A Brand New Bag
4. You Wanna Be My Lover
5. You're Gettin' It
6. Do It Right
7. Beautiful
8. Come On Now
9. That's The Way I Am
10. Nites Lites

Their second album is called Lovelite (2009)

1. Thank you for you
2. Good thing
3. Take me now
4. Let's have some fun
5. I hate to hate you
6. Funky children
7. Againstupidity
8. What about love
9. Every woman is a diva
10. Speak music
11. Opposites

So Clear (2011)

1. Change
2. Listen For a While
3. Burning
4. Move It On
5. I Love You More Than Words Can Say
6. Tiger
7. Till I found You
8. You Reap What You Sow
9. In Transit
10. So Clear
11. The Battle Of Life

After All (2013)

1. Whether You Like It Or Not
2. Feel Alive
3. Better Than I Am
4. Old Souls
5. Waves And Wings
6. Out Of My Head
7. Ain't No Use
8. Our Rulers Are Lyers
9. Cool Town
10. After All

== Singles ==
1. I Got You Man/Wake Up (Funkorama 2005)
2. Do It Right/What's Going On (Funkorama 2006)
3. Papa's Got A Brand New Bag/Charlie Love (Unique 2007)
4. Too Much/Runaway People (Unique 2008)
5. Thank You For You/Let's Have Some Fun (Unique 2009)
