= Dafuniks =

Danish band

Dafuniks is hip-hop/soul Danish band comprising Justmike, DJ Nyber, PrinceJuice, Christian Jespersen, Thomas Cox, and Tue Damskov, as well as rappers Elias and Joseph Agami. It was founded in 2008 in Copenhagen. Their first album, "Enter the Sideshow Groove," was released in 2012, and their second album, "Past Present Future," was released in March 2015.
