= Siri Svegler =

Swedish actress

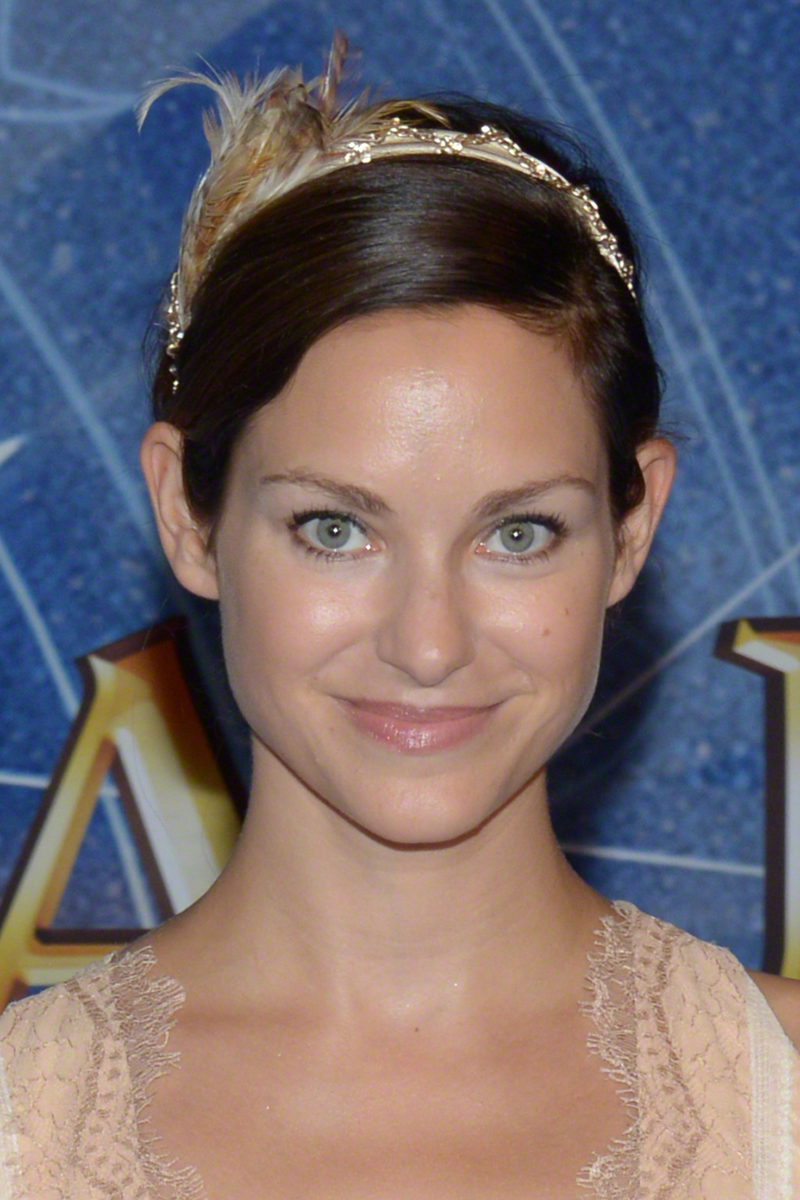
Siri Svegler (2014)

Siri Svegler (born 15 April 1980) is a Swedish-born actress, singer and songwriter. She played the Greek character Polydora in the film Troy. In 2009 her debut album "Silent Viewer" was released. One of her well-known songs is "Their Wine".

== Biography ==
Siri Svegler was born and raised in Gothenburg, Sweden. In 2000 she left her home to start her studies at the renowned Arts Educational School in London. Apart from working as a Jazz Singer along famous musicians such as Christian Vaughan she also appeared on the big screen - in Wolfgang Petersen´s historical epic Troy (2004) and The Line of Beauty. After moving to Berlin in 2007, Siri Svegler, selected by Popstar SEAL, won the VW Soundfoundation contest and the award for “Best Newcomer Pop” for her debut album "Silent Viewer" in 2008. Her latest album "Lost & Found" was awarded "Album of the year" (English-speaking) by the 31st GERMAN ROCK AND POP AWARDS.

Currently, she lives and works in Berlin, Germany.

== Musical career ==
During her time in London, Svegler was the lead singer of the Band "Guido Sol" and was part of various Jazz projects. Her first album, “Silent Viewer” was released by the label Compost in 2009. Her music combines Jazz, Rock, Blues and Pop elements all with poetic lyrics and a stunning voice. Siri writes all her songs herself – including Soundtrack material. Her latest single, “Beautiful Losers” is the main track of the German movie Gangsterläufer. Her second album, Lost & Found, was released July 19, 2013. "Paperdoll Dress" and "Coming up Roses" are included on the Soundtrack for the German movie-epos Sapphire Blue.

== Filmography ==
Year	Title	Role	Notes
2004	Troy	Polydora	
2006	The Line of Beauty	Martine	2 episodes
2009	Ghost Whisperer		USA, TV Series
