= Chocolate Weasel =

British musical duo

- Genres: Funk, hip hop
- Labels: Ninja Tune
- Past members: T Power; Chris Stevens

Chocolate Weasel is a funk and hip-hop duo made up of T Power and Chris Stevens.

== Discography ==
- Spaghettification (1998) - Ninja Tune
- "Music for Body Lockers" (1998) - Ninja Tune
