= Born Jamericans =

American reggae group

- Edley Shine (left) and Notch

Background information
- Origin: Washington, D.C., United States
- Genres: Ragga, hip hop, reggae
- Years active: 1994-1999, 2015–present
- Labels: Delicious Vinyl; Eastwest Records
- Members: Norman Howell; Edley Payne

Born Jamericans are a reggae/hip hop duo formed in Washington, D.C., in the 1990s.

The group consisted of Norman "Notch" Howell and Horace "Edley Shine" Payne. Notch's voice is smooth and melodic, while Shine's is rougher and tends more toward toasting. Their debut album, Kids from Foreign, was released in 1994 on the hip hop label Delicious Vinyl, and following its success the group toured with Buju Banton, Shabba Ranks, Zhane and Shai, and toured Japan with Shinehead and Mad Lion. In 1996, they contributed the soundtrack to the film Kla$h. The duo's second album, released in 1997, featured guest appearances from Mad Lion, Shinehead and Johnny Osbourne. Both albums were chart successes in the United States.

== Discography ==
=== Albums ===
- Kids from Foreign (Delicious Vinyl, 1994) U.S. #188, U.S. R&B #36, U.S. Reggae #2
- Yardcore (Delicious Vinyl, 1997) U.S. R&B #65, U.S. Reggae #2

=== Charting singles ===
Year	Title	Chart positions			
Year	Title	U.S. Hot 100	U.S. R&B	US Rap	U.S. Dance/ Maxi Singles
1993	"Boom Shak-a-Tack"	84	57	15	20
1994	"Cease & Seckle"	—	82	32	34
1997	"Yardcore"	—	45	8	—
1998	"Send My Love/Send One Your Love"	72	60	19	—
