= Kids from Foreign =

Studio album by Born Jamericans
- Released: 1994
- Recorded: 1993–94
- Genres: Hip hop, reggae
- Label: Delicious Vinyl
- Producer: Chucky Thompson

Born Jamericans chronology
| Kids from Foreign (1994) | Yardcore (1997) |

Kids from Foreign is the debut studio album by Born Jamericans.

Kids from Foreign was the fifth-best-selling reggae album of 1994. It peaked at No. 188 on the Billboard 200.

== Critical reception ==
Professional ratings
Review scores
| Source | Rating |
|---|---|
| AllMusic | 4/5 stars |
| The Indianapolis Star | 1.5/4 stars |

The Tampa Bay Times wrote that the group's sound "is strictly reggae and their beats are funky and energetic, making it hard to find a low spot on the whole album." The Indianapolis Star concluded that "what's missing on this disc are the bass-driven beats spliced with playfully funky horn riffs that are common elements of dance-hall style reggae."

== Track listing ==
1. "Instant Death Interlude" - 2:22
2. "Warning Sign" - 4:43
3. "So Ladies" - 3:43
4. "Sweet Honey" - 3:28
5. "Informa fe Dead" - 4:26
6. "Cease & Seckle" - 4:07
7. "Ain't No Stoppin" - 4:50
8. "Why Do Girl" - 4:15
9. "Oh Gosh" - 6:02
10. "Nobody Knows" - 5:01
11. "Boom Shak a-Tack" (Dancehall Remix) - 4:07
