= Yardcore =

Studio album by Born Jamericans
- Released: May 13, 1997
- Recorded: 1996–1997
- Studio: Platinum Island Studios * Battery Studios * Central Studios * Hollywood Sounds
- Genre: Hip hop, reggae
- Label: Delicious Vinyl
- Producer: RAH Salaam Remi Mad Lion Terry Lewis Eddison Electrik Robert Livingston Sting International

Born Jamericans chronology
Kids from Foreign (1994)	Yardcore (1997)

Professional ratings
Review scores
Source	Rating
AllMusic	3/5 stars

Yardcore is the second and final studio album by Born Jamericans. The title track was released as single on CD and 12" vinyl, with several remixes.

"Yardcore" reached #8 on the U.S. Hot Rap Singles chart. The album ranked #14 on Billboard's list of the best-selling reggae albums of 1997.

== Critical reception ==
The Washington Post praised the album, writing: "Jamericans work in the reggae dancehall tradition of growling deejay (Shine) and silky-smooth singer (Notch), and underneath is essential jeep music, with all the thuds and thumps of a dancehall-hip-hop fusion."

== Track listing ==
1. Prodigal Sons [Written by Horace Payne, Norman Howell, Benoit Tshiwala]
2. Yardcore [H. Payne, N. Howell, B. Tshiwala]
3. State of Shock IV (featuring Johnny Osbourne) [N. Howell, Errol Osbourne, H. Payne, B. Tshiwala, Jepther McClymont, and Phillip Burrell]
4. Superstar [H. Payne, N. Howell, and B. Tshiwala]
5. Rassclot [H. Payne, N. Howell, and B. Tshiwala]
6. Back for Good [Gary Barlow]
7. Send My Love (Interlude) (Stevland Morris)
8. Send My Love/Send One Your Love (Stevland Morris)
9. C'yaan Done [H. Payne and N. Howell]
10. Wherever We Go [H. Payne and N. Howell]
11. Venus [H. Payne, N. Howell, and B. Tshiwala]
12. Follow the Pace [H. Payne, N. Howell, and Tony White]
13. Gotta Get Mine (featuring Mad Lion, Shinehead & Sleepy Wonder) [Archer Selwyn, Edmund Aiken, H. Payne, Norman Giscombe, N. Howell, Omar Preece, and Robert Carter]
