= Pam Bricker =

American singer and professor of music

- Born: Pamela Carroll Bricker; July 7, 1954; Richmond, Virginia, U.S.
- Died: February 20, 2005 (aged 50) Takoma Park, Maryland
- Genres: Jazz, rock, folk, trip hop, electronica
- Occupations: Singer, Songwriter
- Instruments: Vocals, Guitar
- Formerly of: Thievery Corporation, Mad Romance

Pamela Carroll Bricker (July 7, 1954 – February 20, 2005) was a jazz singer and professor of music at George Washington University. She was a frequent collaborator and guest vocalist with the group Thievery Corporation, and the voice on their track "Lebanese Blonde", which was popularized by its inclusion on Zach Braff's Garden State soundtrack. She was also a member of Mad Romance vocal quartet from 1983–1989. Bricker was frequently nominated for Washington Area Music Association (WAMA) honors and won as best contemporary jazz vocalist in 1999, 2000 and 2001, and best contemporary jazz album in 2001 for U-topia.

In 2005, Bricker died due to suicide by hanging. On May 2, 2006, Thievery Corporation released one of Pam's last recordings, "The Passing Stars", on iTunes to raise money for Chernobyl Children's Project International and Children of Chernobyl Relief and Development Fund. In 2007, Bricker was given WAMA's "Special Appreciation" award. Her long-time musical partner, Wayne Wilentz (with whom she recorded U-Topia), presented the award.
