= Thievery Corporation =

American electronica duo

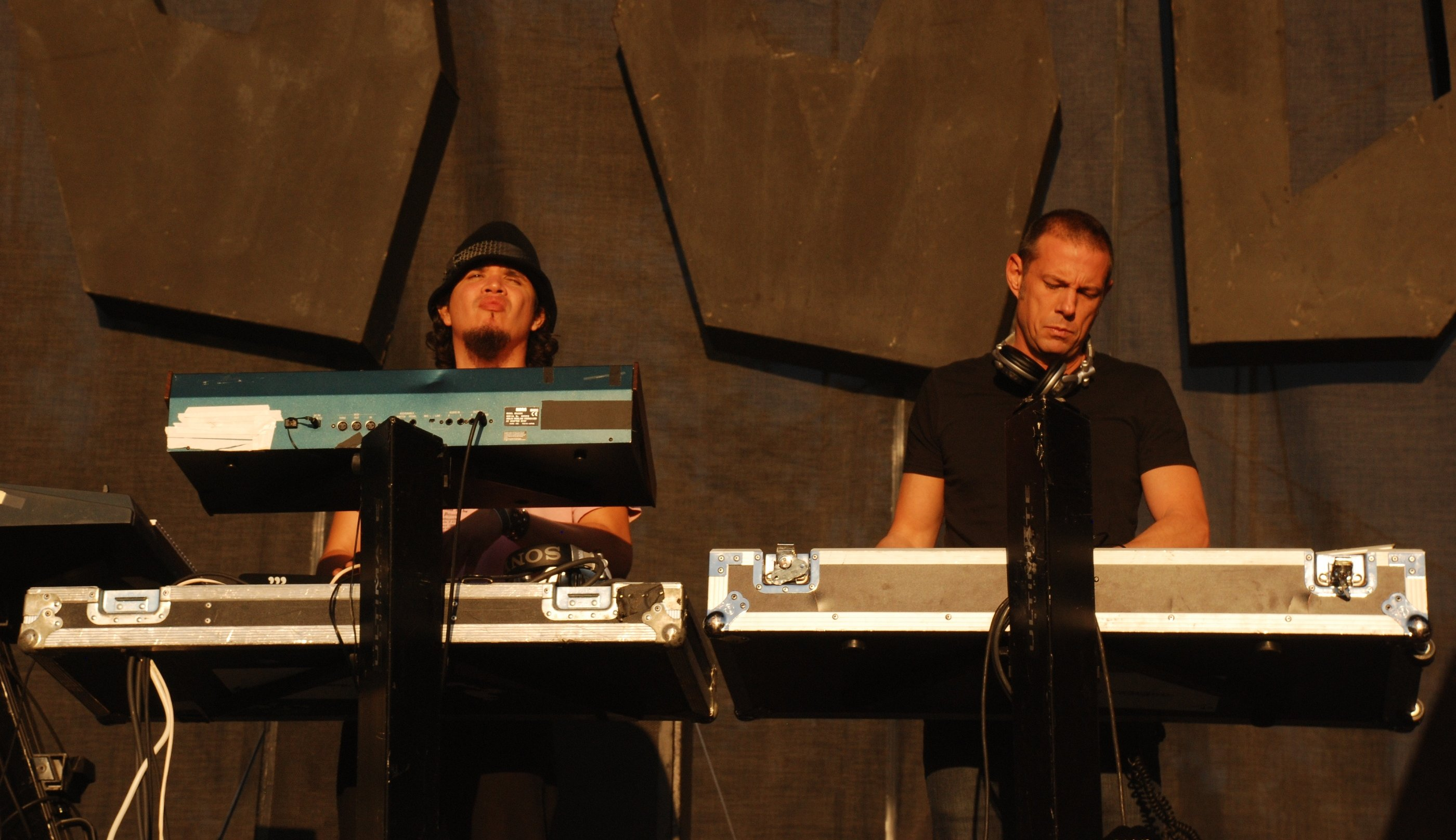
- Rob Garza (left) and Eric Hilton (right) in 2008

Background information
- Origin: Washington, D.C., U.S.
- Genres: Downtempo; chill-out; dub; electronica; trip hop; IDM
- Years active: 1995–present
- Label: ESL
- Members: Rob Garza; Eric Hilton
- Website: ThieveryCorporation.com

Thievery Corporation is an American electronic music duo consisting of Rob Garza and Eric Hilton. Their musical style mixes elements of dub, acid jazz, reggae, Indian classical, Middle Eastern music, hip-hop, electronica, and Brazilian music, including bossa nova.

== History ==
Thievery Corporation was formed in the summer of 1995 at Washington D.C.'s Eighteenth Street Lounge. Rob Garza and Lounge co-owner Eric Hilton were drawn together over their mutual love of club life, as well as dub, bossa nova, reggae, EDM, and jazz records. They decided to see what would come of mixing all these in a recording studio, and from this, in 1996 the duo started their Eighteenth Street Lounge Music record label.

Downtempo and lounge-influenced electronic music gained wider popularity in the late 1990s through artists such as Thievery Corporation and the rise of chill-out rooms in club culture.

The duo drew attention with their first two 12-inch offerings, "Shaolin Satellite" and "2001: a Spliff Odyssey", and with their 1996 debut LP, Sounds from the Thievery Hi-Fi.

Thievery Corporation performs in December 2024

In 2001, they released Sounds From The Verve Hi-Fi, a "best of" compilation of 1960s–1970s material of Verve Records that includes Jazz, Bossa Nova and Latin Jazz works from artists like Cal Tjader, Wes Montgomery, Sérgio Mendes & Brasil '66, Luiz Bonfá, among others.

In 2002, they released The Richest Man in Babylon on their ESL label. This 15-track album is similar in sound and timbre to their earlier 2000 release, The Mirror Conspiracy, and features performances by vocalists Emilíana Torrini, Pam Bricker, and Loulou Ghelichkhani.

In 2004, they released The Cosmic Game, which has a darker, more psychedelic sound than The Richest Man in Babylon. The album also featured more high-profile guest singers on it, including Perry Farrell, David Byrne, and Wayne Coyne of The Flaming Lips.

In 2006, the group released Versions, a selection of remixes by Thievery Corporation for other artists. They toured around the United States, playing at Lollapalooza. The tour was photographed by Rob Myers, Thievery Corporation's sitar and guitar player, in the Blurb photo book Thievery Corporation 2006. In 2006, the band also recorded "Sol Tapado" for the AIDS benefit album Silencio=Muerte: Red Hot + Latin Redux produced by the Red Hot Organization. As well, in the 2006 release of Tiger Woods PGA Tour for Xbox, their music was featured as the soundtrack to the game. Also in 2006, Puma Ptah, then known as Ras Puma, joined and toured with Thievery Corporation and continues to tour with them today.

The group released their fifth studio album, Radio Retaliation, on September 23, 2008. It was nominated for the Grammy for best recording package. Thievery Corporation's tour started out with five consecutive sold-out shows at the 9:30 Club in Washington, DC.

They were the opening act on August 1, 2009, for Paul McCartney at FedExField in Landover, Maryland.

On July 27, 2010, Babylon Central, the cinematic directorial debut of founding member Eric Hilton, was released. Set (and shot) in Washington, D.C., the film follows tripwire events in the interconnected lives of its characters, each influencing power brokers' schemes to manipulate international currencies.

In June 2011, Thievery Corporation released their sixth album, Culture of Fear, which also featured the vocal stylings of Puma Ptah, then known as Ras Puma, on the tracks: "Overstand" and "False Flag Dub."

In January 2012, Thievery Corporation launched a remixes contest in conjunction with Dubspot. The same year, Eric Hilton from Thievery Corporation produced the debut album, Archives, for Washington D.C. based reggae band "The Archives."

The band released Saudade on March 25, 2014, via ESL Music.

On January 11, 2017, the band released the song "Ghetto Matrix" from their album The Temple of I & I, which was released on February 10, 2017, again via their own ESL Music label.

On April 20, 2018, the band released Treasures from the Temple via ESL Music.

== Influences ==
Throughout their career, the duo has repeatedly expressed their fondness for Brazilian culture in interviews and liner notes of their releases, especially of the 1960s Bossa Nova music movement. Some of their earlier recordings were accompanied by artwork paying specific homage to classic releases by bossa nova artists like João Gilberto (his self-titled 1973 album) or Tom Jobim (Stone Flower). Their 1997 debut album is also dedicated to the memory of Brazilian musician Antonio Carlos Jobim, who died three years earlier.

The languages of the group's lyrics throughout their career include: English, Spanish, French, Italian, Persian, Portuguese, Romanian and Hindi. This reflects the group's world music influences.

== Politics ==
Thievery Corporation has taken left-wing political stances on various issues, opposing war and what they regard as exploitative trade agreements, while supporting human rights and food programs.

In September 2005, the group participated in the Operation Ceasefire concert, with the objective of ending the Iraq War.

From their press release regarding their album Radio Retaliation, Garza said:

Radio Retaliation is definitely a more overt political statement [...] There's no excuse for not speaking out at this point, with the suspension of habeas corpus, outsourced torture, illegal wars of aggression, fuel, food, and economic crises. It's hard to close your eyes and sleep while the world is burning around you. If you are an artist, this is the most essential time to speak up.

— Rob Garza

Radio Retaliation's album cover features Subcomandante Marcos, a Mexican insurgent who is the spokesperson for the Zapatista Army of National Liberation. The album explores various left-wing themes, such as the song The Shining Path, named after the Peruvian Maoist communist party The Shining Path.

Thievery Corporation are vocal advocates for the World Food Programme, seeing hunger as "...something basic, really elemental, that transcends boundaries around the world."

== Members ==
Full members

- Rob Garza – bass, guitar, keyboards, production
- Eric Hilton – bass, guitar, keyboards, production

Touring and studio musicians

- Jeff Franca – drums
- Rob Myers – sitar, guitar
- Frank Orrall – percussion, drums, vocals
- Dan Africano – bass

Touring and studio vocalists

- Natalia Clavier
- Loulou Ghelichkhani
- Shana Halligan
- Racquel Jones
- Mr. Lif
- Notch
- Puma
- SEE-I
- Laura Vall

== Discography ==
=== Studio albums ===
List of studio albums, with selected chart positions
Title	Year	Peak chart positions									
Title	Year	US	US Dance	AUS	AUT	BEL (FL)	FRA	GER	ITA	NZ	UK
Sounds from the Thievery Hi-Fi	1996	—	12	—	—	—	—	—	—	—	—
The Mirror Conspiracy	2000	—	—	56	48	—	45	32	26	22	76
The Richest Man in Babylon	2002	150	2	40	45	—	43	42	22	9	139
The Cosmic Game	2005	94	1	46	48	25	66	50	25	24	74
Radio Retaliation	2008	35	1	—	—	64	108	—	59	35	175
Culture of Fear	2011	52	3	—	—	—	—	—	—	39	—
Saudade	2014	58	2	—	—	51	—	—	—	—	78
The Temple of I & I	2017	111	4	—	18	30	—	37	—	—	—
Treasures from the Temple	2018	—	8	—	21	113	—	49	—	—	—
Symphonik	2020	—	—	—	—	—	—	—	—	—	—

=== Compilation albums ===
- Abductions and Reconstructions (1999)
- Rare Tracks: 18th Street Lounge (1999)
- DJ-Kicks: Thievery Corporation (1999)
- Thievery Corporation and Revolution Present: Departures (2000)
- Sounds from the Verve Hi-Fi (2001)
- The Outernational Sound (2004)
- Versions (2006)
- Red Hot + Latin: Silencio = Muerte Redux (2006)
- It Takes a Thief (2010)
- Thievery Corporation 30 (2026)

=== Singles ===
Singles released on ESL Music, unless noted.

- "2001 Spliff Odyssey" (1996)
- "Shaolin Satellite" (1996)
- "The Foundation" (1996)
- "ESL Dubplate" (1996)
- "Encounter in Bahia" (1997)
- "Lebanese Blonde" (4AD 1997)
- ".38.45 (A Thievery Number)" (4AD 1998)
- "Halfway Around the World" (1998)
- "So Com Voce" (1998)
- "Incident at Gate 7" (1998)
- "DJ-Kicks EP / It Takes a Thief" (Studio !K7, Rough Trade, 1999)
- "Focus on Sight" (2000)
- "The Lagos Communiqué" (2000)
- "Focus on Sight" (2000)
- "Sound File 001" (4AD 2000)
- "Sound File 002" (4AD 2000)
- "Shadows of Ourselves" (4AD 2000)
- "DC 3000" (2000)
- "Thievery Corporation Vs Nicola Conte – Bossa Per Due" (2001)
- "The Richest Man in Babylon" (2003)
- "The Heart's a Lonely Hunter" (2005)
- "Revolution Solution" (2005)
- "Warning Shots" (2005)
- "The Time We Lost Our Way" (2005)
- "Sol Tapado" (2005)
- "Originality" (2006)
- "Supreme Illusion" (2007)
- "Radio Retaliation Extras" (2008)
- "Sound the Alarm / La Femme Parallel" (Sonik Magazine 2009)
- "Vampires" (2011)
- "Culture of Fear" (2011)

=== Eric Hilton albums ===
- Peace Bureau Inner City Booms LP (2017)
- Infinite Everywhere (2020)
- The Impossible Silence (2020)
- Ceremony (2021)
- Lost Dialect (2022)
- Corazón Kintsugi (feat. Natalia Clavier) (2023)
- Sound Vagabond (2024)
- Out of the Blur (2024)
- Midnight Ragas (2025)
- A Sky So Close (2026)
