= ESL Music =

American independent record label

Eighteenth Street Lounge Music (ESL Music) is an independent record label based in Washington, D.C. founded by Rob Garza and Eric Hilton in 1996. The duo, as Thievery Corporation, heads the label's roster of artists.

== Roster ==
ESL Music's current artists include:

- Afrolicious
- AM & Shawn Lee
- Ancient Astronauts
- Chris Joss
- Congo Sanchez
- Dust Galaxy
- Federico Aubele
- Frank Mitchell Jr.
- Joe Bataan
- Kabanjak
- Natalia Clavier
- Nickodemus
- Novalima
- Ocote Soul Sounds
- The Archives
- The Funk Ark
- Thievery Corporation
- Thunderball

== See also ==
- List of record labels
