= Feature Inc. =

Former art gallery

Feature, also known as Feature Gallery and Feature Inc., opened in Chicago on April 1, 1984, with an exhibition of Richard Prince rephotographs. The gallery then moved to New York in 1988.

Feature officially became Feature Inc. in January 1994.

The gallery always had two or more exhibition spaces, to present multiple exhibitions simultaneously. Hudson (an artist known by his last name only), the director of the gallery, said this was to move "against stardom and a push for pluralism and multiplicity."

== Hudson ==
The gallery was founded by Hudson, who managed the gallery for almost 30 years. Hudson had graduated with an MFA in painting from the University of Cincinnati in 1977 and also worked as a dancer and performance artist, before becoming an arts organizer. After working for a few years in the non-profit sector, Hudson opened Feature in 1984 to operate with more freedom and autonomy.

In a 2004 interview with artist Dike Blair, Hudson said: "It is the responsibility of the galleries to challenge and broaden the market, not to acquiesce to it."

The gallery closed in February 2014, after Hudson died unexpectedly at the age of 63. In his obituary in the New York Times, writer Roberta Smith called Hudson "One of the most prescient, independent-minded and admired gallerists of his generation."

Hello We Were Talking About Hudson (Soberscove Press 2024), is a collection of 35 interviews with friends, artists, collectors and colleagues edited by Steve Lafreniere.

== Artists and programming ==
Although it was an independent commercial gallery, Feature was frequently confused for a non-profit because of its eclectic programming and mix of diverse artists. When asked about this, Hudson once said, "Nearly 10 years of working in the plurality consciousness of artist-run spaces had established my interest in diversity."

Artists who worked regularly with the gallery included B. Wurtz, Kay Rosen, Hirsch Perlman, Kathe Burkhart, Tony Tasset, Jeanne Dunning, Jim Isermann, Nancy Shaver, Lily van der Stokker, David Moreno, Alexander Ross, Judy Linn, David Shaw, Jason Fox, Lisa Beck, Dike Blair, Tom of Finland, Richard Rezac, Tyler Vlahovich and Roy McMakin.

Feature presented many notable artists in New York for the first time, including Charles Ray, Raymond Pettibon, Tom Friedman, Takashi Murakami, and Vincent Fecteau.

In addition to exhibitions, Feature hosted monthly video screenings, readings by authors including Dennis Cooper, Gary Indiana, and David Sedaris, and published an irregular magazine called FARM.

Feature often had poetically titled group shows, including "Godhead", "Sparkalepsy", "Hairy Forearm's Self-Referral", "Running in Flip-Flops", "Mighty Graphitey", and "ITSY BITSY SPIDER".
