= Chris Joss =

French instrumentalist and record producer

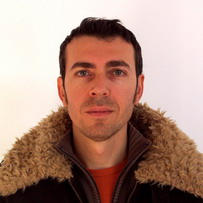
- Joss in November 2004

Background information
- Also known as: Chris Josse
- Origin: France
- Genres: Funk, electronica, acid jazz, lounge, jazz funk
- Occupations: Musician, producer, composer
- Instruments: Bass, drums, guitar, keyboards, percussions, Sitar, flute
- Years active: 1998–present
- Labels: ESL Music, Irma Records, Pulp Flavor
- Website: Official website

Chris Joss is a French multi-instrumentalist and record producer.

== Early life and education ==
Chris Joss was born in France. When he was 14, he received an acoustic guitar and taught himself to play. In 1981, he founded his own band at high school.

== Career ==
In 1987, Joss released his first record with his three-member band on EMI. In 1991, he released his third record on CBS with a seven-member band. He moved to London, where he lived throughout the 1990s, until it became too expensive. In 1994 he played with a group called Monk and recorded and produced his first album. In 1995 and 1996, he embarked on recording his inaugural LP, Music From 'The Man With a Suitcase', conceptualized as the soundtrack for an imaginary 1960s TV series. In 1998, the title track was included in a compilation in the UK.

Joss returned to France and secured a deal with Cristal Publishing in La Rochelle, which facilitated an agreement with the French indie label Pulp Flavor. When US record label ESL re-released You've Been Spiked in 2004 with new cover art, the cover described him as a DJ, leading to a string of DJ-related offers. Joss only had the chance to play a few live sets, twice in Amsterdam and twice in his home town in 2007. For these performances he used Ableton Live, a tool designed for music production and live performance. He couldn't continue with these live performances because of his worsening tinnitus at the time. When the album's cover art was adapted for a double LP in 2007 and later re-released on his own label, Joss replaced the word "DJ" with "instrumentalist" to better reflect his role as a composer and a musician.

== Personal life ==
Joss has suffered since childhood from misophonia, a condition that makes one become extremely sensitive to everyday repeated sounds. He titled his 10th album Misophonia to bring attention to the condition. In 2005 he suffered an injury which caused permanent damage to the cartilage and tendons in his elbow, limiting wrist movement to a quarter turn and making extended periods of playing painful. As a result, he no longer performs live.

== Work ==
His music ranges from funk to electronica, and tracks excerpted from his releases are featured in movie trailers such as Accepted (2006), Argo (2012), Hotel for Dogs (2009), Inside Deep Throat (2005), Ocean's Thirteen (2007), and Role Models (2008), and the television shows Six Feet Under and Better Call Saul.

His 1999 album The Man with a Suitcase was part of a trend in the late 1990s of "imaginary soundtracks", compositions created to accompany films that did not actually exist. In the soundtrack, he attempted to pay homage to works of the 1960s and 1970s such as The Avengers and Mission Impossible, with a mixture of jazz, pop, rock, and funk. His 2008 track "I want Freedom", taken from his fourth album, is part of Apple Inc.'s iPhoto 10 and iPhoto 11 software.

As of 2021, Joss had released twelve solo albums plus a remix album; five of them by ESL Music and six on his own Teraphonic Records.

=== Albums ===
- The Man With A Suitcase (1999 Pulp Flavor)
- Dr Rhythm (2002 Irma)
- You've Been Spiked (2004 ESL Music)
- Teraphonic Overdubs (2008 ESL Music)
- I've Been Remixed (2008 Teraphonic Records)
- Sticks (2009 ESL Music)
- Monomaniacs Volume 1 (2010 ESL Music)
- No Play No Work (2011 ESL Music)
- Bimbo Satellite (2014 Teraphonic Records)
- Escape Unlikely (2016 Teraphonic Records)
- Misophonia (2018 Teraphonic Records)
- Monomaniacs Volume II (2019 Teraphonic Records)
- Hyperacusis (2020 Teraphonic Records)
- TR013 (2022 Teraphonic Records)
- Classic Lineup (2024 Teraphonic Records)

=== Singles ===
- Bombay By Bus 12 inch (1999 Pulp Flavor)
- The Gnomes 12 inch (2002 Irma)
- Discotheque Dancing 12 inch (2005 ESL Music)
- A Part In That Show 12 inch (2006 ESL Music)
- Brilliantine a gogo 12 inch (2006 Boutique Chic)
- Superman 12 inch (2007 ESL Music)
- I Want Freedom 12 inch (2008 ESL Music)
- Toxic Smoke/Sequence of Spectators 7 inch (2012 ESL Music)

=== Remixes ===
- Jody Watley - Borderline CD (2008 Curvve Recordings)
- Pirates of the Caribbean: Dead Man's Chest - He's A Pirate 2x12 inch & CD (2006 Walt Disney)
- Jody Watley - Looking For A New Love CD (2005 Curvve Recordings)
- Joe Bataan - Chick A Boom CD (2006 ESL Music)
- Woody Herman - Mambo Herd CD (2006 Sunswept)
- Thunderball - Thunder In The Jungle 12 inch (2007 ESL Music)
- Praful - Sigh CD (2007 Therapy Records)
- Bebo Valdes - Ita Morales CD (2008 Essential Media Group)
- AM & Shawn Lee - I Didn't Really Listen (ESL Music 2012)
- Yerba Buena - Sugar Daddy CD (2005 Razor and Tie)

=== Production ===
- Monk - Ten Tips For Charles Berry's Hips" (1995 Station Records)
- Cazwell - I buy my socks on 14th Street 2 versions (2006 West End Records/2008 Peace Bisquit)
- Cazwell - The Sex That I Need (2006 West End Records/2008 Peace Bisquit)
- Los Amigos Invisibles - Corduroy (2009 Unreleased)

=== Other releases ===
- Inside Deep Throat Original Soundtrack CD (2006 Koch Records)
- Stereoscope Jerk Explosion - La Panthere Pop (2008 Cosmic Groove) Sitar on 2 tracks
- Atfunk - Rewire Walks (2008 Extremely House Music) keyboard on 3 tracks
- Atfunk - Soundprism (2012 Plugtone records) keyboards on Restart and Tranquilito
