= Envoy Enterprises =

Art gallery in New York City, U.S.

Coordinates: 40.72006°N 73.98899°W

Envoy Enterprises (stylized as envoy) was a contemporary art gallery located on the Lower East Side of Manhattan, New York City. Envoy Enterprises was founded by Jimi Dams in 2005 and was the first gallery to abandon its prime location in Chelsea for the Lower East Side in 2007.

Artists represented here included Gary Indiana, Michael Lazarus, Narcissister, and Alex Rose.

Aside from the exhibitions in its gallery space, Envoy Enterprises featured video and performance artists as well as emerging bands both in the gallery and previously at Home Sweet Home, which was located at their 131 Chrystie Street location. Envoy Enterprises relocated to 87 Rivington Street in 2012.

Envoy Enterprises showcased two different kinds of exhibitions: one extended show for represented artists that changed every six weeks and a "One Day At A Time" exhibition that presented emerging, unrepresented artists on a daily basis.

Dams announced that the gallery would close in August 2017.
