= Ice Cream Truck (song) =

Single by Cazwell

from the album Watch My Mouth (Deluxe Edition) and Spork (Original Motion Picture Soundtrack)
- Released: August 17, 2010
- Genre: Hip hop
- Length: 2:17
- Label: Peace Bisquit
- Songwriter(s): Cazwell, Chris Bracco
- Producer(s): Cazwell, Chris Bracco

Cazwell singles chronology
"Tonight" (2009)	"Ice Cream Truck" (2010)	"Get My Money Back" (2011)

Music video
- "Ice Cream Truck" on YouTube

"Ice Cream Truck" is a song by American rapper Cazwell. The song has been described as a light, easy and '80s-sounding hip-hop song that uses a xylophone to emulate a jingle played on an ice cream truck. The single was released in August 2010, and is a track on the deluxe edition of Cazwell's second album Watch My Mouth.

"Ice Cream Truck" was written and produced by Cazwell and Chris Bracco, originally for the 2010 film Spork, which was written and directed by J.B. Ghuman Jr. but did not plan to have a commercial release until Cazwell's manager suggested doing a video for the song. The video, which was directed by Marco Ovando, premiered on YouTube on July 30, 2010, and received over 1 million views within a week.

== Background and release ==
Cazwell approached his friend J.B. Ghuman Jr. to submit tracks for a film Ghuman was directing and writing, 2010's Spork. The songs did not meet with Ghuman's approval. The director wanted a song that had an "80s hip-hop feel" with "minimal cute noises" and was "Something summery – like going to the ice cream truck." Cazwell and his engineer agreed of doing a song called "Ice Cream Truck" on the last day working with Ghuman for the film. The track was written in 45 minutes, and the song was recorded in the next hour and 45 minutes. He claimed of writing the song in a "Chinese-food hangover."

Cazwell had not planned "Ice Cream Truck" to have a commercial release. However, in June 2010, with no music video released by him in a few months, his manager suggested that he do a video for the song. The music video was released on YouTube on July 30, 2010, and was later made available on iTunes on August 24. The single was released on August 17, and comes with an a cappella and instrumental version of the song. The song also appears as the third track on the deluxe edition of Cazwell's second album Watch My Mouth.

== Composition ==
"Ice Cream Truck" has been described by both Cazwell and other writers as a cute, simple and upbeat 1980s-style hip-hop summer anthem. It plays at a length of two minutes and seventeen seconds and at a tempo of 127 beats per minute. Keyboard-performed xylophones are used in the track's instrumentation to emulate an ice cream truck jingle. Cazwell said about the song; "The lyrics aren’t overtly sexual and the video is fun and sexy. And makes people feel fun and happy about being gay. It’s an irresistible song. It’s not pushy. Everyone’s smiling and having a good time." The track was well received by a writer for The Advocate, who noted the song to be "destined to rival Katy Perry's "California Gurls" as this summer's most sizzling anthem."

== Music video ==
The video debuted on YouTube on July 30, 2010, and was directed by Marco Ovando. The dancers in the video were Avi Vichner, Alex Maravilla, Jimmy Gonzales, Cesar Abreu, Joe Buffa, Johnny Sanford, Eddie Barrena, John Byrne and Geronimo Frias. The video was shot in Cazwell's apartment in one day. According to Cazwell:

"We just used color backdrops and did the whole thing in one day. That wall – the kind of Mexicana rose color – that’s my apartment, and when we’re outside, that’s my block. Me and Marco [Ovando], the director, we both work in clubs so we know all the hot dancers. So all those boys from the video are just dancers from the clubs. I wanted it to be sexy but I wanted to be very cute, too. My mission whenever I make a video is, ‘let me make a video that looks like how I think the song sounds’ – and that’s what the song sounds like to me. It’s cute, it’s summertime. I also wanted to dedicate the video to hot Latin boys of New York.”

Because of the provocative nature of the music video, YouTube has flagged the video for adult content. Thomson called the video "this summer's raunchiest music video," while Michael Musto of The Village Voice named it "hypnotically suggestive" and a "sweet uplift". It was rated "music video of the day" by Paper magazine on August 16, 2010. The video became a viral hit, receiving over 1 million views within a week. A sequel of the video is for Cazwell's "Get My Money Back", which featured the same dancers as in "Ice Cream Truck".

Yogurt company Snog also did a commercial taking on the music video, which also featured Cazwell and the same dancers, and was directed by Ovando. A brand of underwear based on the song was also sold in retailers.
