= Stupak =

Stupak is an occupational surname of Jewish (eastern Ashkenazic) and Ukrainian origin, which means "horse mill", or a worker at a horse-powered mill.

People with the surname Stupak include:

- Alex Stupak (born 1980), American chef
- Bart Stupak (born 1952), American politician
- Bec Stupak (born 1974), American artist
- Bob Stupak (1942–2009), American businessman
- Yuliya Stupak (born 1995), Russian cross-country skier
