= Martin Cameron =

Martin Cameron may refer to:

- Martin Cameron (South Australian politician) (1935–2025)
- Martin Cameron (Victorian politician)
- Martin Cameron (footballer) (born 1978), Scottish footballer

== See also ==
- Cameron Martin (disambiguation)
