= BloomBars =

Coordinates: 38°55′48.7″N 77°1′40.8″W

Bloombars
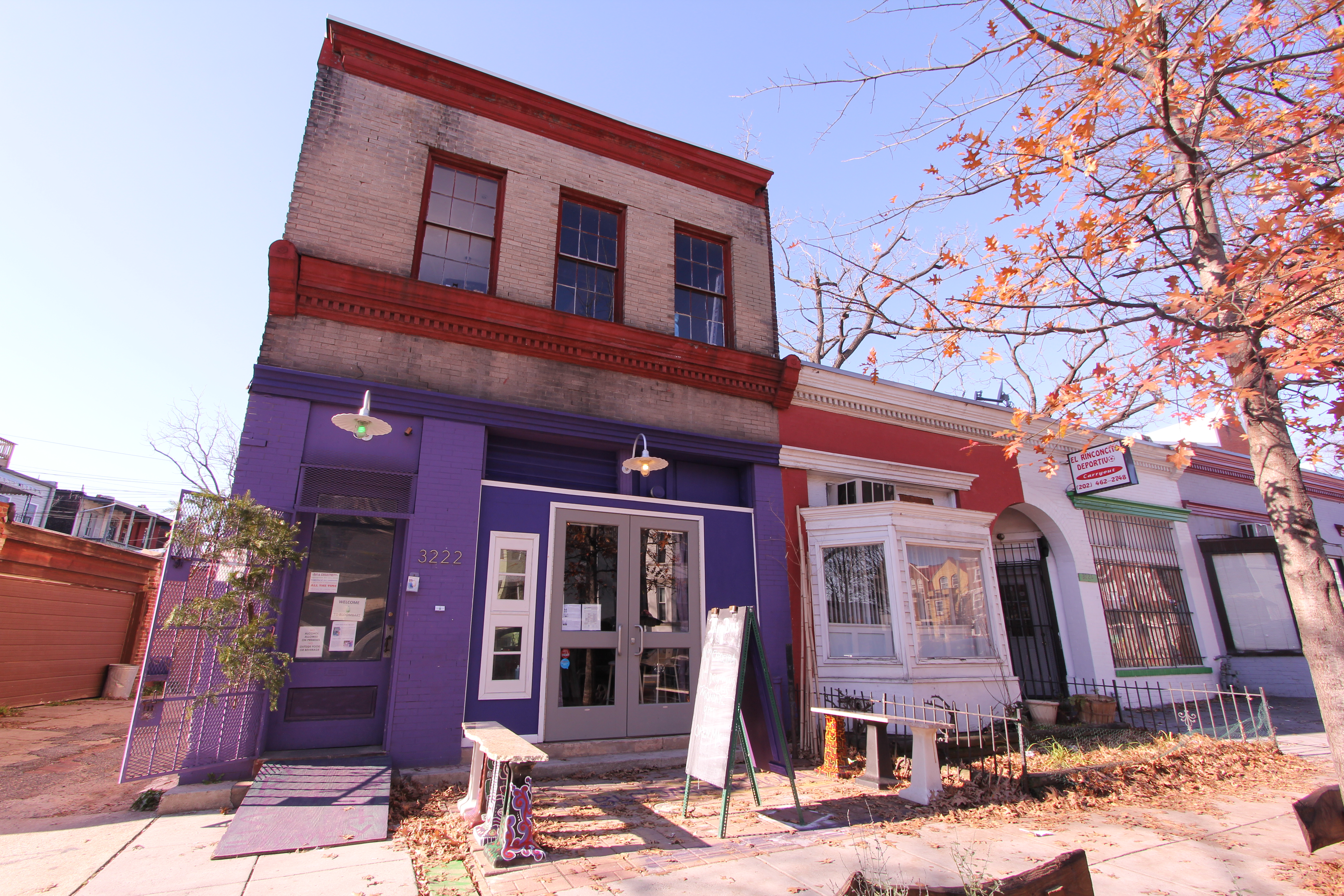
- Interactive map of Bloombars
- Address: 3222 11th Street, NW; Washington, D.C. 20010
- Location: Columbia Heights
- Owner: John Chambers
- Public transit: Washington Metro at Columbia Heights

Construction
- Opened: June 2008

BloomBars is a not-for-profit community arts organization based in the Columbia Heights neighborhood of Washington, D.C. Launched in June 2008 out of a former print shop at 3222 11th Street NW by John Chambers, the space currently hosts dance and wellness classes, film screenings, an open mic night, art exhibitions/performances and facilitates an artist residency program.

== History ==
Founder and "chief executive gardener" John Chambers purchased the two-story Columbia Heights property and the space was still undergoing renovations when BloomBars first opened its doors on June 30, 2008. At the time, Chambers was "senior vice president at GMMB, a political consulting and advocacy advertising firm for Democratic candidates, including the Obama campaign."

Chambers brought a background in advocacy, marketing and communications for social justice issues to his vision for the new arts community space and eventually left his marketing career to work at BloomBars full-time. In December 2010, funding problems threatened to close BloomBars' doors. The organization launched an aggressive fundraising campaign, however, and raised $20,000 in a joint online/offline campaign, which allowed the organization to continue operations.

This campaign relied on the collaborative fundraising website Indiegogo. As of 2010, "the venue has partnered with over 1,000 local and international non-profits" and has enabled "literally thousands of artists to experiment in front of a welcoming and open-minded audience."

In 2011, BloomBars established a fiscal sponsorship with the nonprofit arts support organization Fractured Atlas.

== Mission and operations ==
BloomBars is a volunteer run, not-for-profit organization and community "founded on the belief that art and artists have the power to transform communities and alter the way individuals think, feel, and experience." It "bills itself as an underground 'spontaneous' scene for art and music" and is an all-ages, "alcohol and profanity free establishment" funded through a "donation based structure."

The decision to ban alcohol from the space is "a policy that some friends say is financially ill-advised but that [Chambers has] stuck to because he thinks booze turns off some people and takes focus off the art."

The goal is to become "part of an international network of creative spaces" and to both replicate and expand the organization's community-based structure. The organization has a strong commitment to its own community, Columbia Heights. As cited in DCist, a local online news blog, "'BloomBars has a love affair with Columbia Heights—the history, cultural diversity, residents new and old, and its businesses that we all support religiously,' explained Chambers. 'We've felt like undercover ambassadors for Columbia Heights.'"

BloomBars' motto is "You Bloom. We Bloom." and from the space's opening until mid-2011, those words were painted above its front doors in place of a venue sign. BloomBars is "a community-based venture, rooted in the arts, that could serve as an incubator for individual and community growth." Explaining the organization's structure, Chambers has said, "cultural shifts in behavior can happen over time if we effectively communicate our value, and help folks understand that a donation is an investment in their growth, and the community’s growth—like our tag, 'You Bloom. We Bloom.'" BloomBars does not establish its own programming, but facilitates programming run by the wider community. Anyone with interest and initiative is able to pitch a project or schedule time for a performance.

The organization maintains a comprehensive "multi-media effort through outlets like [YouTube Channel] Bloom TV and its newsletter, The Weekly Bloom."

== Notable events and awards ==
=== Best of DC 2009, Washington City Paper ===
Staff Pics: Second Best Open Mic: "Don’t let the name fool you—if you’re looking for beer, conventional 'service,' or consistent hours of operation, then BloomBars is not the spot for you. But sign up for its mailing list and wander over to this barely established establishment on an evening when it’s holding a showcase, and you’ll discover one of D.C.’s best-kept secrets."

=== Hip Hop Cultural Exchange Program, January 2010 ===
BloomBars hosted a two-week alliance between a popular South African Hip-Hop artist (Hip-Hop Pantsula) and an acclaimed American Hip-Hop artist (Asheru). The vision grew "into a comprehensive two-week schedule to include intense traveling, performance, literacy activism, HIV/Aids awareness presentations, educational workshops, and more, with Asheru serving as guide and ambassador."

=== Columbia Heights' Hip Strip, New York Times Travel Guide, February 2011 ===
BloomBars was cited among five independent local businesses along 11th Street NW that established the street as Washington DC's "Hip Strip" according to the New York Times. "There's no booze on offer at this nonprofit 'art bar' — but partiers are still welcome."
