= Michael Lazarus =

American painter (born 1969)

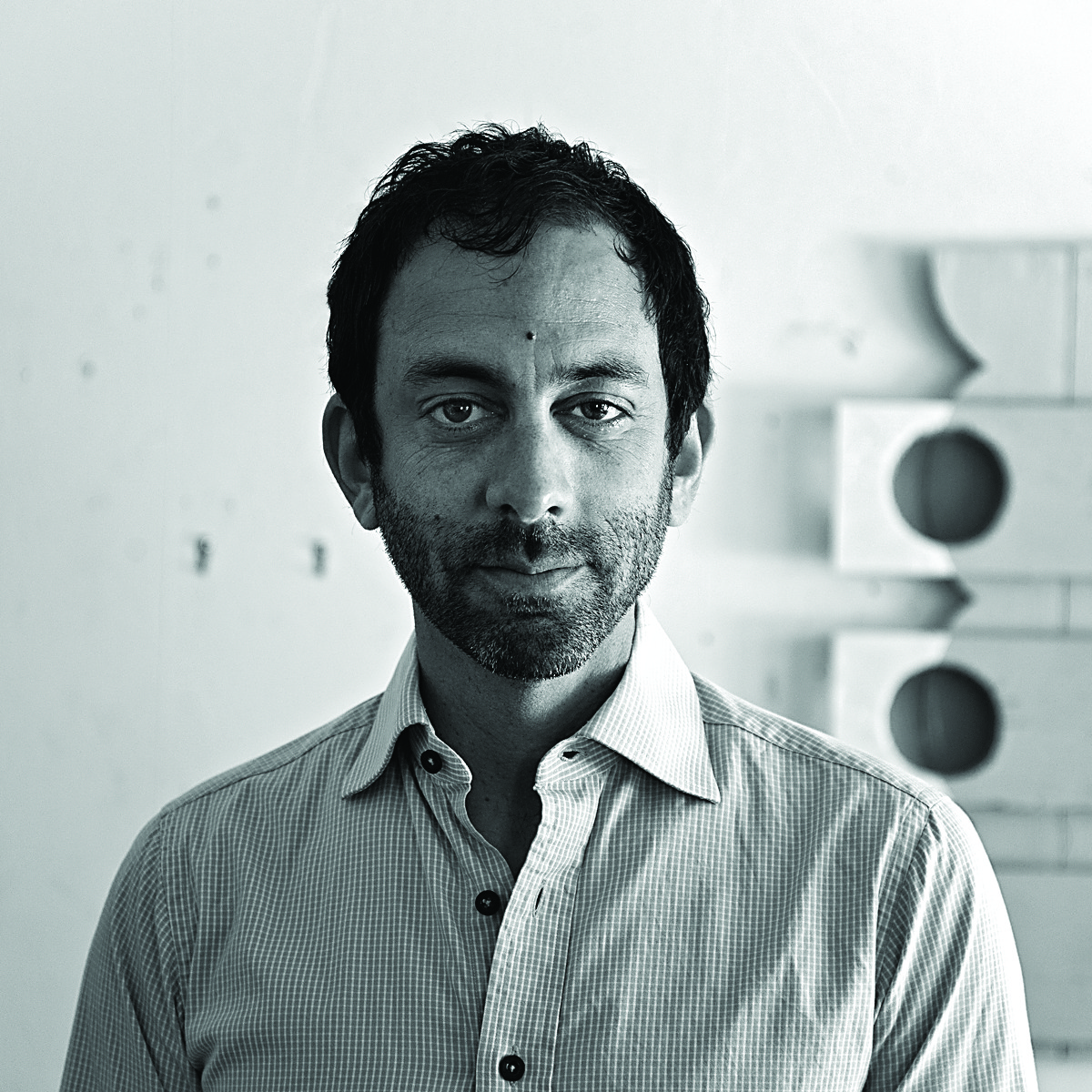
Michael Lazarus

Michael Lazarus (born 1969) is an American painter. He has been working since the early 1990s.

== Career ==
His first solo exhibition was in 1998 at Feature, Inc. Lazarus was represented by Feature until 2011, exhibiting alongside artists including B. Wurtz, Dike Blair, Jim Isermann, Tom Friedman, Lisa Beck, Takashi Murakami, and Lily van der Stokker. In 2000, he was one of the first 'alternative' artists to have a solo show in the "Gallery 2" program at Andrea Rosen Gallery. Lazarus has had solo exhibitions in Los Angeles, San Francisco, Montreal, Antwerp, and Amsterdam. In 2006 Lazarus' works were exhibited in conversation with Emory Douglas and Corita Kent in "That was then... This is now" at MoMA PS1.

Lazarus has also worked as a collaborator in the group Assume Vivid Astro Focus, on two separate projects. Lazarus' work is included in several public and private collections, including The Frances Young Tang Teaching Museum and Art Gallery, The Portland Art Museum, The Progressive Corporation, and JPMorgan Chase. His work is featured in Cut & Paste: 21st-Century Collage.

== Additional sources ==
Wagle, Kate (2015). Curator and Critic Tours, Connective Conversations: Inside Oregon Art 2011-2014, The Ford Family Foundation and University of Oregon. GHP, Connecticut. pp. 172–173. ISBN 9780871141828.

Zevitas, Steven. "Pacific Coast". New American Paintings. 121 (6): 86–89.

Roberts, Richard Brereton with Caroline (2011). Cut & paste : 21st-century collage. London: Laurence King Publishing. pp. 104–109. ISBN 978-1856697170.

Cotter, Holland (6 January 2011). "New Sparkle for an Abstract Ensemble". The New York Times.

Johnson, Ken (2 September 2010). "The Allure of the Homespun in the Maw of the Digital Age". The New York Times.

Cotter, Holland (7 January 2010). "Art in Review: The Perpetual Dialogue". The New York Times.

Ebgi, Anat (November–December 2008). "Reviews". Flash Art.

Pagel, David (29 September 2006). "Into a void of inhuman beauty". The Los Angeles Times.

Wei, Lilly (April 2006). "Reviews". Art News.

Nobue, Isono (2004). Nyūyōku no atorie : nyūyōku āto to kuriētātachi no sugao. Tōkyō: Gyappujapan. pp. 96–99. ISBN 4883572226.

Melissa, Feldman (March 2004). "Michael Lazarus at San Francisco Art Institute and Feature". Art in America.

Mondt, Zoey (November–December 2001). "Reviews". Art Issues.

Cotter, Holland (31 March 2000). "Review: Michael Lazarus". The New York Times.

Cash, Stephanie (December 2000). "The Hotel as Art". Art in America.

Pagel, David (9 July 1999). "Review". The Los Angeles Times.

Cotter, Holland (2 August 1996). "Home Is Where the Art Is". The New York Times.
