= Get Into It =

Get Into It may refer to:

Music

- Get Into It (Egyptian Lover album) (1998)
- Get Into It (Cazwell album) (2006)
- "Get Into It (Yuh)", a song by Doja Cat (2021)
- "Get Into It", a song by Big Daddy Kane, the B-side of the single "Ain't No Half-Steppin'" (1988)
- "Get Into It", a song by Conor Oberst from Water (1993)
- "Get Into It", a song by Cyantific and Wilkinson (2011)
- "Get Into It (Roll Around in It)", a song by King Missile from Royal Lunch (2004)

Mottoes and slogans

- "Get Into It!", the motto of Rockville, Maryland, U.S.
- "Get Into It", a slogan used by the Australian television network Arena
- "Get into it", a slogan used by the Canadian CTV Television Network
- "Get into it", a slogan used by Warner TV in Asia

== See also ==
- Into It (disambiguation)
