= Radio Free DC =

Studio album by Fort Knox Five
- Released: October 21, 2008
- Recorded: 2008
- Label: Fort Knox Recordings
- Producer: Fort Knox Five

Radio Free DC is the debut studio album of electronic music group Fort Knox Five. It was recorded in the band's hometown of Washington, D.C. The concept of Radio Free DC is that the listener is scanning the radio dial and encountering different sounds from Washington, D.C., including jingles and banter from radio jockeys interspersed throughout the album. The music video for the first single Funk 4 Peace debuted on October 24.

== Track listing ==
1. "RFDC: A Place Called Fort Knox" – 0:24
2. "Insight" (featuring Asheru) – 4:11
3. "Funk 4 Peace" (featuring Mustafa Akbar) – 4:25
4. "How To Start a Band" (featuring Ian Svenonius) – 4:13
5. "Sao Funky parts 1 & 2" (featuring Javier Miranda) – 3:49
6. "The FK Strut" – 3:43
7. "RFDC: Calling All Stations" – 0:16
8. "The Party Pushers" – 4:03
9. "Killa Soundboy" (featuring Sleepy Wonder & Zee of See-I) – 4:18
10. "The Wonder Strikes Again" (featuring Sleepy Wonder) – 3:43
11. "The Spirit of '75" (featuring Mustafa Akbar) – 5:00
12. "RFDC: The Power of Five" – 0:27
13. "Papa Was Stoned" – 4:47
14. "Uptown Tricks" (featuring Mustafa Akbar) – 4:14
15. "Not Gonna Take It" (featuring Rootz) – 4:27
16. "RFDC: Signing Off" - 1:00
