= Kraak & Smaak =

Dutch musical production trio

- Origin: Leiden, Netherlands
- Genres: Electronic; funk
- Years active: 2003–present
- Labels: Jalapeno Records; Quango Music; PIAS Recordings; KSR; Ultra Records; Traffic; Time Records Italy
- Members: Oscar de Jong; Mark Kneppers; Wim Plug
- Website: www.kraaksmaak.com

Kraak & Smaak (Dutch: [ˌkraːk ɛn ˈsmaːk]) is a musical production trio from the town of Leiden, Netherlands, consisting of Oscar de Jong, Mark Kneppers and Wim Plug. The three began recording in 2003. Their first album, titled Boogie Angst, was released in the UK 2006, and they began performing at music festivals and at clubs in the US and UK. Their songs were played on the radio and were used in television shows. Their second album, released in 2008, was titled Plastic People. They won an EBBA. Their third album, Electric Hustle, was released in 2011.

== Career ==
In 2003, UK label Jalapeno Records released the project's initial 12"s. Interest from Annie Nightingale and Pete Tong led to airplay and the recording of a DJ guest mix for BBC Radio 1. Several remixes for UK artists such as Mark Rae and DJ tours across the US and Australia followed.

Their debut album Boogie Angst, was released in the UK 2006. It featured several artists, including U-Gene and Dez (who wrote and sang the single "Keep Me Home"). Benelux and Japan and a band is set up to be able to play live alongside the DJ sets. Throughout 2006 and 2007, their shows took them to festivals such as the Pinkpop, Sziget, SXSW, Miami's Winter Music Conference, Bonnaroo, Coachella, the Australian Good Vibrations Festival, and on a first small club tour in the US, during which they opened for Faithless a number of times. Supported by Jason Bentley of KCRW the album was re-released in the US by Quango Music, and various tracks found their way into television series such as Grey's Anatomy, Men in Trees and What About Brian?

The Remix Sessions was released in early 2007. It includes previously released material remixed by artists including Jamiroquai, Sarah Bettens and Kruder & Dorfmeister. It also includes a remix of the Skeewiff cover version of "Man Of Constant Sorrow" (as made famous by the O Brother, Where Art Thou? film by the Coen brothers). Since then Junkie XL, Sam Sparro, and others have also been re-rubbed.

In 2008, their second artist album was released, Plastic People, whose title track was written by featured UK artist Bobby Nio and Mark Brydon of electro band Moloko. The first single off that album, "Squeeze Me", featuring UK singer Ben Westbeech, was a minor hit, with a number 6 position in the Dutch pop charts and receiving much rotation worldwide. The video by Dutch director Andre Maat, with its "flip book" theme, won support from US celebrity blogger Perez Hilton and rap artist / producer Kanye West and picked up various awards. In the US, the album and single were released by Ultra Records and BBC Radio 1 DJ Annie Mac asked Kraak & Smaak to record a minimix.

Dance magazine IDJ describes Kraak & Smaak as a "must see live band," alongside names such as the Chemical Brothers, Moby and The Prodigy. Building on that qualification, during 2008 Kraak & Smaak played the Glastonbury Festival, Bestival, Bloom, Lovebox Festival, the Big Chill festival and club shows at The Cargo and The End in the UK, the Rothbury Music Festival in the US, Lowlands in the Netherlands and again the Sziget festival. During their US live tour at the end of 2008, they performed live on Jimmy Kimmel Live! on ABC television. In 2009 and 2010, new US DJ and live tours follow, playing shows nationwide in clubs and on festivals such as the Ultra Music Festival, Rothbury, Coachella, Detroit Movement, Wakarusa, and so forth.

In January 2009, the project won the EU sponsored European Border Breakers Award (EBBA), alongside acts such as The Ting Tings and Adele. The award was presented at the Eurosonic festival in Groningen (city), during a television show hosted by Jools Holland.

After a long period of touring and collaborations (Sander Kleinenberg) and even more remixes (Maxwell, Max Sedgley, Fedde le Grand, Darwin Deez, etc.), Kraak & Smaak's third album, Electric Hustle, was released in April 2011, featuring Romanthony, Lee Fields, Janne Schra, John Turrell and Lex Empress a.o. on vocal duties. A new series of dancefloor EPs was released under the name of Kraak Beats and Moby's new single "The Day" was remixed.

In 2013, Kraak & Smaak released their fourth album, Chrome Waves, followed by Chrome Waves Remixed in 2014.

In 2016, their fifth studio album Juicy Fruit was released then also followed by a remix album in 2017.

In 2018, Kraak & Smaak mixed the album Poolside Miami.

== Discography ==
Albums

- Velvet Seas (Boogie Angst UK, 2025)
- Pleasure Centre (Boogie Angst UK, 2019)
- Juicy Fruit (Jalapeno Records UK, 2016)
- Chrome Waves (Jalapeno Records UK, 2013)
- Electric Hustle (Jalapeno Records UK; P.I.A.S. Benelux, 2011)
- Plastic People (Jalapeno Records UK, 2008; P.I.A.S. Benelux, 2008; Ultra Records USA, 2008; Traffic Japan, 2008)
- Boogie Angst (Jalapeno Records UK, 2005; P.I.A.S. Benelux, 2006; Quango Music USA, 2006; KSR Japan, 2006)

Remix Albums

- Pleasure Centre Remixed (Boogie Angst UK, 2020)
- Juicy Fruit Remixed (Jalapeno Records UK, 2017)
- Chrome Waves Remixed (Jalapeno Records UK, 2014)
- Mixed Feelings (Jalapeno Records UK, 2012)
- The Remix Sessions (Jalapeno Records UK, 2007; Quango Music USA, 2007)

Compilation/Mix Albums

- Poolside Miami (Toolroom Longplayer, 2018)

Singles and EPs

- Scirocco (Boogie Angst UK, 2021)
- All I Need (feat. iogi) (Boogie Angst UK, 2021)
- I Don't Know Why feat. Mayer Hawthorne (Jalapeno Records UK, 2016)
- Call Up To Heaven feat. Lex Empress (Jalapeno Records UK, 2011)
- Dynamite feat. Sebastian (Jalapeno Records UK, 2010)
- Kraak Beats Volume 1 (Jalapeno Records UK, 2010)
- I Ain't Gonna Take It No More (Jalapeno Records UK, 2009)
- Plastic People feat. Bobby Nio (Jalapeno Records UK, 2008)
- Squeeze Me (Jalapeno Records UK, 2008)
- That's Our Word (Jalapeno Records UK, 2008)
- Funk Ass Rotator (Jalapeno Records UK, 2007)
- No Sun in the Sky (Jalapeno Records UK, Quango Music USA, 2007)
- Keep Me Home (2006; Jalapeno Records UK, Quango Music USA, P.I.A.S. Benelux, 2006)
- Bacardi Bat Beats (Bacardi NL, 2006)
- One of these Days (Jalapeno Records UK, 2005)
- Money in the Bag Remixes (Jalapeno Records UK, 2005)
- Say Yeah (Jalapeno Records UK, 2004)
- Set Fire to the Disco (Jalapeno Records UK, 2004)
- Keep on Searching (Jalapeno Records UK, 2003)
- Money in the Bag (Jalapeno Records UK, 2003)

Remixes

- The Funk Hunters - Party Rockin (Westwood Recording, 2019)
- Moby - The Day (Little Idiot, 2011)
- Darwin Deez - Bad Day (Lucky Number, 2010)
- Fort Knox Five - What make ya dance (Fort Knox Recordings, 2010)
- Maxwell - Pretty Wings (Sony USA, 2009)
- Caro Emerald - Back It Up (Grandmono, 2009)
- Fedde Le Grand - Let Me Be Real (Flamingo Recordings, 2009)
- Smoove & Turrell - You Don't Know (Jalapeno Records, 2009)
- Zuco 103 - Back Home (Long Tail Recordings, 2009)
- Monsieur Dubois - Rue Denmark (Supertracks, 2008)
- Sam Sparro – 21st Century Life (Island Records, 2008)
- Junkie XL – More (Nettwerk USA, 2007)
- Rose – Shame (Red Ink / Sony NL, 2007)
- Soul of Man – Suk Dis / Dat (Fingerlickin' Records UK, 2007)
- Sonik-Omi – Heeron Ka Chor (Bombay Connection NL, 2007)
- Fort Knox Five – Learning it the hard way (Fort Knox USA, 2007)
- Richard Dorfmeister vs MDLA – Boogie No More (G-Stone Austria, 2007)
- Lack of Afro – Wait a Minute (Freestyle Records UK, 2006)
- Zeroleen – All Good (Quango USA, 2006)
- Bitter:Sweet – The Mating Game (Quango USA, 2006)
- Jamiroquai – Electric Mistress (Sony, 2005)
- Chris Joss – Take Part in that Show (ESL Music USA, 2005)
- Jamiroquai – Seven Days in Sunny June (Sony, 2005)
- Resin Dogs – She's Gone (Jalapeno Records UK, 2005)
- Skeewiff – Man of Constant Sorrow (Jalapeno Records UK, 2005)
- Mimezine – Can't get Enough (Electric Co. NL, 2005)
- Max Sedgley – Devil Inside (Sunday Best UK, 2005)
- Mark Rae – Medicine (Grand Central UK, 2004)
- Ikon – Do you dream? (Jalapeno Records UK, 2004)
- Karl Moestl – Love is my Religion (Mouth to Mouth Music Austria, 2004)
- Ikon – The Dove (Jalapeno Records UK, 2003)
