= Unspoken Heard =

American hip hop group

Asheru and Blue Black of the Unspoken Heard
- Origin: Washington DC, United States
- Genres: Hip hop
- Years active: 1996–present
- Label: Seven Heads/Ice Age Entertainment/Warner Music Group
- Members: Asheru; Blue Black

The Unspoken Heard is the hip-hop collaborative of rapper Asheru and producer Blue Black. It is often referred to as Asheru & Blue Black of the Unspoken Heard. They began getting significant recognition in underground hip-hop around the turn of the millennium. Their sound is reminiscent of the New York "new school" sound of the early 1990s, particularly that of the Native Tongues Posse.

Asheru's profile and popularity have increased due to his intro and outro theme music for the animated series The Boondocks on Adult Swim.

== Discography ==
=== Albums ===
- Soon Come (LP) (2001) Seven Heads
- 48 Months (LP) (2003) Seven Heads

=== EPs ===
- Cosmology (EP) (1997) Seven Heads
- Jamboree (1999) Seven Heads
