= Cameron Martin =

Cameron Martin may refer to:

- Cameron Martin (artist)
- Cam Martin (born 1998), American basketball player

== See also ==
- Cameron–Martin theorem, a theorem of measure theory
