= You've Been Spiked =

Studio album by Chris Joss
- Released: 5 October 2004
- Genre: Funk
- Length: 55:38
- Label: ESL Music

You've Been Spiked is a 2004 album by Chris Joss.

Professional ratings
Review scores
| Source | Rating |
|---|---|
| Allmusic | 4/5 stars |

== Track listing ==
1. Discothèque Dancing
2. You've Been Spiked
3. Drink Me Hot
4. Wrong Alley Street (Part 1)
5. Riviera 69
6. Shellah V.
7. Wrong Alley Street (Part 3)
8. Waves Of Love
9. A Part n That Show
10. Early Morning Wanderings
11. Waking Up in the Park
12. The Man with a Suitcase (bonus track)
13. The Wait (bonus track)
