= Fort Knox Five =

American hip hop group

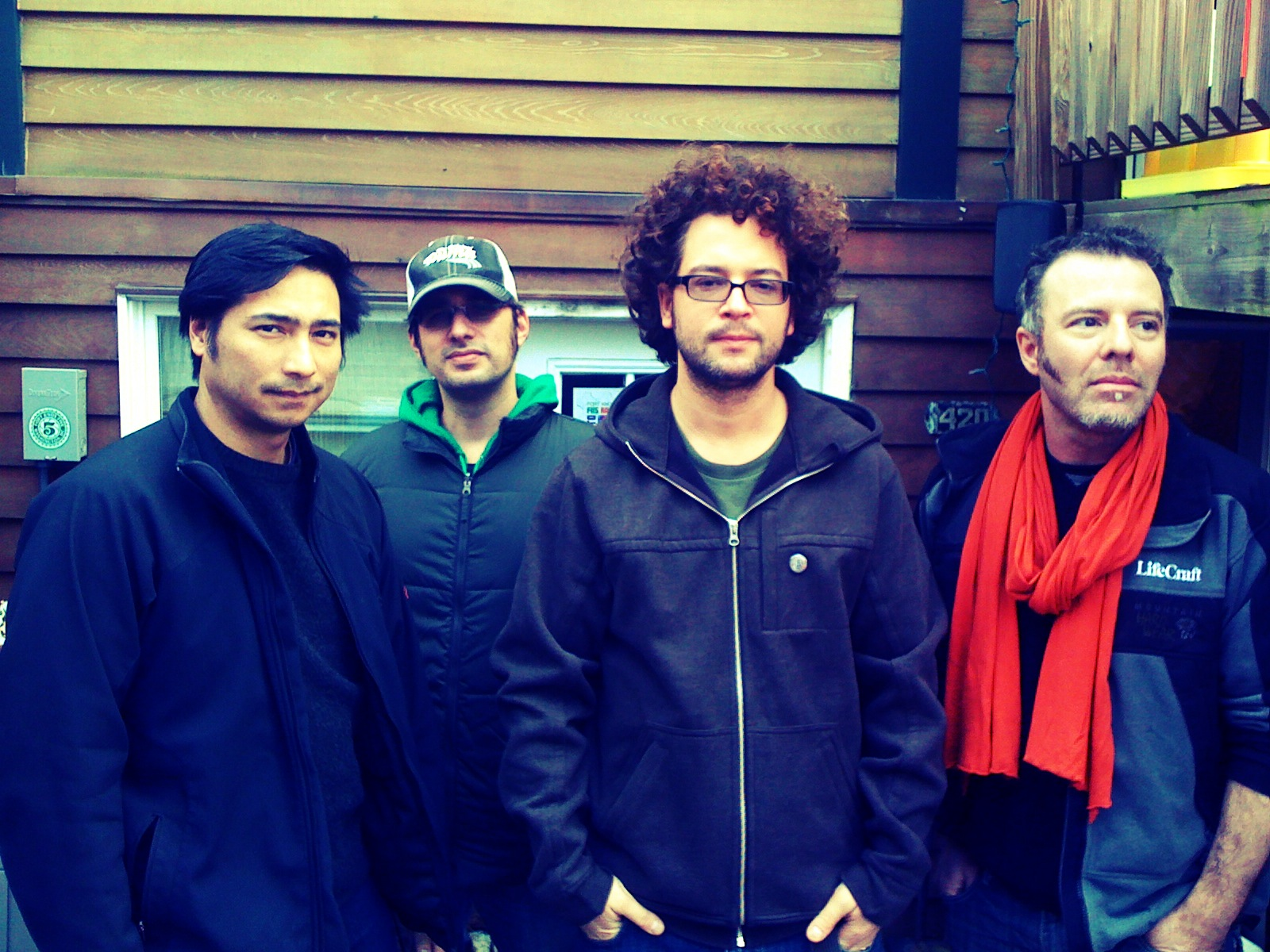
- Fort Knox Five at Fort Knox Studios

Background information
- Origin: Washington, D.C., U.S.
- Genres: Electronic, funk, reggae, hip hop
- Years active: 2003–present
- Label: Fort Knox Recordings
- Members: Steve Raskin; Rob Myers; Sid Barcelona
- Past members: Jon Horvath (deceased)
- Website: fortknoxfive.com

Fort Knox Five is a Washington, D.C., based musical group consisting of Steve Raskin, Rob Myers and Sid Barcelona. Jon Horvath was a member of the group until his death in 2015. The musical collective releases music through their self-run label, Fort Knox Recordings. Their music style mixes elements of funk, reggae, hip hop and electronic music.

== History ==
Fort Knox Five was formed in 2003 by Steve Raskin, Rob Myers, Sid Barcelona and Jon Horvath. The group chose their name "because our studio has always been called Fort Knox," though there were only four members in the group. The members hail from various side projects and previous outfits: Steve Raskin was originally part of Edsel and Raskal as well as ESL Music groups Liftoff and Thunderball; Rob Myers played sitar and guitar with Thievery Corporation and International Velvet and guitar in See-I; Jon Horvath recorded music with both DJ Dan and Raskal; and Sid Barcelona was also a part of Liftoff and Thunderball, like Raskin. The band formed their record label, Fort Knox Recordings, to release their music, and the label is now distributed by Washington, D.C.'s Dischord Records.

In 2005, Fort Knox Five opened for Gwen Stefani's Harajuku Lovers Tour throughout North America, playing numerous shows alongside Stefani and the Black Eyed Peas. The band was selected by Urb Magazine for their annual "Next 100" artists to watch.

In 2007, Fort Knox Five was selected to remix two Bob Marley songs, which were released on Roots, Rock, and Remixed. The band also selected as the resident DJ at the Eye Candy Sound Lounge at the Mandalay Bay Resort and Casino in Las Vegas.

In 2008, Fort Knox Five released their debut studio album, Radio Free DC, which features all four members of the band on production as well as numerous guest vocalists and musicians.

In 2009, Fort Knox Five began the year with a tour of Australia. Fort Knox Recordings then hosted a special inaugural event called The Funk 4 Peace Ball, which featured Afrika Bambaataa, 2Tuff and Nappy Riddem. In January, the group was featured on the soundtrack for EA's Skate 2 video game. The band also released Volume 1 of Radio Free DC Remixed in February 2009.

Fort Knox Five member Jon Horvath died on August 21, 2015.

In 2020, Fort Knox Five received the WAMMY (Washington Area Music Award) for Best Electronic/Techno Artist or Group

== Discography ==
=== Albums ===
- Radio Free DC (2008)
- Pressurize the Cabin (2015)

=== Singles and EPs ===
- Dodge City Rockers (2003)
- The Big Score (2003)
- Blowing Up the Barrio (2004)
- The Brazilian Hipster (2004)
- Radio Free DC (2005)
- The Spirit of '75 (2007)
- Bob Marley Remixed (2007)
- Radio Free DC Remixed Vol 1 (2009)
- Radio Free DC Remixed Vol 2 (2009)
- Radio Free DC Remixed Vol 3 (2009)
- Radio Free DC Remixed Vol 4 (2009)
- Radio Free DC Remixed Vol 5 (2009)
- Radio Free DC Remixed Vol 6 (2009)
- Radio Free DC Remixed Vol 7 (2009)
- Radio Free DC Remixed Vol 8 (2009)
- Radio Free DC Remixed Vol 9 (2009)
- Radio Free DC Remixed Vol 10 (2009)
- The New Gold Standard Vol 2 (2010)
- Shift Remixed EP (2010)
- Bhangra Paanch Remixed EP (2010)

=== Compilations ===
- The New Gold Standard (2006)
- Reminted (2007)
- Radio Free DC Remixed (2009)
- The New Gold Standard 2 (2010)
- 10 Years of Fort Knox Five (2013)

=== Remixes ===
- Rodney Hunter – Electric Lady (2004)
- Dr. Rubberfunk – The Owner (2004)
- Dynamo Productions – Get It Together (2004)
- Jeff Settle – The Whistle Song (2005)
- Tower of Power – This Type of Funk (2005)
- Mo' Horizons – Drum 'n' Boogaloo (2005)
- Rex Riddem – Salvador Diaspora (2005)
- Torpedo Boyz – Are You Talking To Me!?? (2005)
- Kraak & Smaak – One of These Days (2006)
- Chris Joss – Wrong Alley Street (2006)
- A Skillz & Krafty Kuts – Ain't It Funky (2006)
- Tito Puente – Ran Kan Kan (2006)
- Deborah Bond – Don't Waste Your Time (2006)
- Nickodemus – Give the Drummer Some (2006)
- Skeewiff – Now I'm Living For Me (2006)
- Sulphonic Soundsystem – Catalina Sunset (2006)
- Louis Armstrong – Jeepers Creepers (2007)
- Joe Bataan – The Fool (2007)
- Malente – Open Secret (2007)
- Ancient Astronauts – 36 Hours (2007)
- Thunderball – Strictly Rudeboy (2007)
- Afrika Bambataa – Got That Vibe/Just A Smoke (2007)
- Ursula 1000 – Electric Boogie (2007)
- Bob Marley – Duppy Conqueror (2007)
- Bob Marley – Soul Shakedown Party(2007)
- Dust Galaxy – Here Come The Trumpets (2007)
- Bitter: Sweet – Salty Air (2007)
- Watch TV & The Primetime – Voodoo Royale (2007)
- Thunderball – Strictly Rudeboy feat Rootz & Zeebo(2007)
- All Good Funk Alliance – NY Funk (2009)
- Sub Swara – The Balance (2009)
- Deekline & Wizard – Bounce & Rebound(2009)
- All Good Funk Alliance – Man With A Jam Plan (2009)
- Kraak & Smaak – Ain’t Gonna Take It(2009)
- Nick Thayer – Let it Go (2010)
- BadBoe – Funk In The Air (2010)
- Scott Hardkiss – Beat Freak (2010)
- Thunderball – Moon On The Rise (2010)
- DJ Love – Zigga Zigga (2011)
- Fuzzbox Inc – Party People(2011)
- Ursula 1000 – Hey You (2011)
- Empresarios – Space Selecta (2011)
- See-I – Haterz 24/7 (2011)
- Shawn Lee & AM – Somebody Like You (2012)
- Superpendejos – La Princesa De La Cumbia (2012)
- Nappy Riddem – Devil Needs A Bodyguard (2012)
- All Good Funk Alliance – Mr. Hipnoid (2012)
- Opiuo – Wiggle Sticks(2012)
- Empresarios – Maria Juana (2013)
- Queen – Bohemian Rhapsody (2014)

=== Featuring artists ===
Fort Knox Five works with various vocalists and musicians to add a live element to their music. The featured artists they have worked with include:

- Afrika Bambaataa
- Asheru
- Ian Svenonius
- Mustafa Akbar
- Members of See-I
- Sleepy Wonder
- Miss Johnna M

== Media Licensing ==
- "Brazilian Hipster" – Hôtel Costes, Vol. 7
- "Brazilian Hipster" – The Cove
- "Brazilian Hipster"- Tiger Woods PGA Tour 07
- "Blowing Up on the Spot"- Tiger Woods PGA Tour 07
- "Insight" – Need for Speed: Shift
- "Insight" – Fringe (season 1) Episode 12
- "King of the Street" – Skate It
- "We Don't Stop Yawl" – NBA Live 10
- "Insight" – Test Drive Unlimited 2
- "Insight" – Dirt 3
- "Funk 4 Peace" – Test Drive Unlimited 2
