= True Colors (tour) =

Former annual American music event

- Continental tour by Various
- Promotional poster for 2007 leg
- Location: North America
- Associated album: Bring Ya to the Brink (2008 leg)
- Start date: June 8, 2007
- End date: July 5, 2008
- Legs: 2
- No. of shows: 41 in North America
Cyndi Lauper tour chronology
The Body Acoustic Tour (2005–2006)	True Colors (2007–2008)	Bring Ya to the Brink Tour (2008)

True Colors was an annual music event created by American recording artist Cyndi Lauper. The concerts were headlined by Lauper and featured various music and comedy acts. Beginning in 2007, the trek supported the Human Rights Campaign, PFLAG and the Matthew Shepard Foundation. Other local and private LGBT charities and foundations were supported as the event grew. The tour began with 16 shows in 2007 expanding to 25 shows in 2008. Lauper's set during the 2008 tour was basically the North American leg of her worldwide Bring Ya to the Brink Tour that year. An outing in 2009 was planned and later cancelled. In lieu of the tour, Lauper partnered with Broadway Impact to create the True Colors Cabaret. The show began September 28, 2009 and ran once a month at Feinstein's at Loews Regency. It featured performances from Lauper, Rufus Wainwright, Lea Michele, Jonathan Groff, Jason Mraz, Sara Bareilles, Karen Olivo, Melinda Doolittle, and Broadway Inspirational Voices. The shows ran until February 2010.

== Background ==
Logo TV was one of the partnering sponsors for the music festival. The channel aired a half-hour special on June 21, 2007 titled Shining Through: Behind the Scenes of True Colors. The special was hosted by Cho at the MGM Grand in Las Vegas, Nevada. During the special, Lauper explained the purpose of the True Colors Tour:

Friends, family, plus the community is a lot of people and together, we make a very loud sound; and I believe that people don't know the facts. They don't know that you can be fired from your job in 33 states if you're gay and lesbian and transgender and bisexual. They don't know that the hate crime bill does not extend to everyone...Education is so important. So that's what we are trying to do – in a fun, loving way.

— Cyndi Lauper

The HRC received $1 from each ticket sold throughout the tour. The theme of the tour was about eliminating hate, specifically about getting the Matthew Shepard Act passed by the U.S. Senate. In October 2007, the US Congress approved the Matthew Shepard Act, accomplishing one of the goals of the tour. In 2008 True Colors tour visited 23 cities across North America with a cast of acts that was even more impressive than the previous year. The shows featured up to eight marquee names per night with several collaborations and an encore featuring every act on stage together.

== Line up ==
=== 2007 ===
Headliners

- Cyndi Lauper
- Debbie Harry
- Erasure

Support acts

- Cazwell
- Amanda Lepore
- Rosie O'Donnell
- The B-52's
- The Dresden Dolls
- Diana Yanez
- Rufus Wainwright
- The Gossip
- The Cliks
- Indigo Girls

Hosted by Margaret Cho

=== 2008 ===
Headliners

- Cyndi Lauper
- The B-52's
- Joan Jett & The Blackhearts

Support acts

- Indigo Girls
- Andy Bell
- Girl in a Coma
- Regina Spektor
- Tegan and Sara
- Colton Ford
- Kat DeLuna
- The White Tie Affair
- DJ Paul V
- Joan Armatrading
- Deborah Cox
- The Cliks
- The Puppini Sisters
- Nona Hendryx
- Sarah McLachlan
- Lili Haydn
- Margaret Cho
- Rosie O'Donnell
- Wanda Sykes
- Kate Clinton

Hosted by Carson Kressley

== Tour dates ==
Date	City	Country	Venue
2007 North American leg
June 8, 2007	Las Vegas	United States	MGM Grand Garden Arena
June 9, 2007	West Valley City	United States	USANA Amphitheatre
June 10, 2007	Morrison	United States	Red Rocks Amphitheatre
June 12, 2007	Chicago	United States	Auditorium Theatre
June 13, 2007	Columbus	United States	Value City Arena
June 15, 2007	Atlantic City	United States	Borgata Event Center
June 16, 2007	Boston	United States	Bank of America Pavilion
June 17, 2007	Columbia	United States	Merriweather Post Pavilion
June 18, 2007	New York City	United States	Radio City Music Hall
June 19, 2007	Toronto	Canada	Molson Amphitheatre
June 21, 2007	Atlanta	United States	Chastain Park Amphitheater
June 23, 2007	Dallas	United States	Smirnoff Music Centre
June 24, 2007	The Woodlands	United States	Cynthia Woods Mitchell Pavilion
June 27, 2007	San Diego	United States	SDSU Open Air Theatre
June 29, 2007	Berkeley	United States	Hearst Greek Theatre
June 30, 2007	Los Angeles	United States	Greek Theatre
2008 North American leg
May 31, 2008	Boston	United States	Bank of America Pavilion
June 1, 2008	Wantagh	United States	Nikon at Jones Beach Theater
June 3, 2008	New York City	United States	Radio City Music Hall
June 4, 2008	Toronto	Canada	Molson Amphitheatre
June 6, 2008	Ledyard	United States	MGM Grand Theater
June 7, 2008	Washington, D.C.	United States	DAR Constitution Hall
June 9, 2008	Minneapolis	United States	U.S. Bank Theater
June 10, 2008	Chicago	United States	Chicago Theatre
June 11, 2008	Clarkston	United States	DTE Energy Music Theatre
June 13, 2008	Atlantic City	United States	Borgata Event Center
June 14, 2008	Bethel	United States	Bethel Woods Center for the Arts
June 16, 2008	Atlanta	United States	Chastain Park Amphitheater
June 17, 2008	Atlanta	United States	Chastain Park Amphitheater
June 18, 2008	Clearwater	United States	Ruth Eckerd Hall
June 19, 2008	Sunrise	United States	Frank Sinatra Theatre
June 21, 2008	The Woodlands	United States	Cynthia Woods Mitchell Pavilion
June 22, 2008	Dallas	United States	Superpages.com Center
June 25, 2008	Phoenix	United States	Dodge Theatre
June 27, 2008	Alpine	United States	The Park at Viejas Outlets
June 28, 2008	Los Angeles	United States	Greek Theatre
June 29, 2008	Berkeley	United States	Hearst Greek Theatre
July 1, 2008	Seattle	United States	WaMu Theater
July 2, 2008	Burnaby	Canada	Deer Lake Park
July 4, 2008	West Valley City	United States	USANA Amphitheatre
July 5, 2008	Morrison	United States	Red Rocks Amphitheatre

=== Box office score data ===
Venue	City	Tickets sold / available	Gross revenue
Auditorium Theatre	Chicago	2,684 / 3,448 (78%)	$325,261
Radio City Music Hall	New York City	5,959 / 5,959 (100%)	$590,113
Hearst Greek Theatre	Berkeley	7,418 / 7,418 (100%)	$498,325
Bank of America Pavilion	Boston	3,584 / 5,166 (69%)	$219,576
Nikon at Jones Beach Theater	Wantagh	6,663 / 13,514 (49%)	$245,295
Molson Amphitheatre	Toronto	7,775 / 8,500 (91%)	$198,200
Chicago Theatre	Chicago	2,072 / 3,136 (66%)	$226,985
Cynthia Woods Mitchell Pavilion	The Woodlands	6,077 / 15,685 (39%)	$258,711
Superpages.com Center	Dallas	7,589 / 19,878 (38%)	$179,639
Dodge Theatre	Phoenix	3,044 / 4,861 (63%)	$201,147
TOTAL		55,865 / 87,565 (60%)	$2,943,252

== Broadcasts and recordings ==
True Colors

Soundtrack album by Various
- Released: August 7, 2007
- Label: Silver Label

A True Colors commemorative album was released on June 12, 2007 through Tommy Boy Records. Physical copies were for sale at the concerts and the album was also available online from the iTunes Store. A reissue commemorative album was again released through the iTunes Store and was available for free download by concert attendees.

Original release
No.	Title	Artist	Length
1.	"True Colors Morel's Pink Noise Mix"	Cyndi Lauper	8:10
2.	"Shores of California"	The Dresden Dolls	3:35
3.	"Oh Yeah"	The Cliks	4:34
4.	"Rock & Roll Heaven's Gate"	Indigo Girls	4:33
5.	"Gay Messiah"	Rufus Wainwright	3:14
6.	"What Is Love"	Deborah Harry	3:14
7.	"Early Bird [DJ Manolo's True Colors Mix]"	Erasure featuring Cyndi Lauper	4:29
8.	"Plastic Surgery Slumber Party"	Jeffree Star	2:12
9.	"(Take Back) The Revolution"	The Gossip	6:47
10.	"Watch My Mouth"	Cazwell	3:07
Total length:			39:11

2008 iTunes release
No.	Title	Artist	Length
1.	"Grab a Hold"	Cyndi Lauper	3:27
2.	"Funplex"	The B-52's	4:12
3.	"Better"	Regina Spektor	3:21
4.	"The Con"	Tegan and Sara	3:29
5.	"One-Eyed Dog"	Mary McBride	3:24
6.	"Allow Me to Introduce Myself... Mr. Right"	The White Tie Affair	2:57
7.	"The Weakness in Me"	Joan Armatrading	3:35
8.	"Nobody's Supposed to Be Here [Special Slow to Fast Version]"	Deborah Cox	3:42
9.	"Oh Yeah"	The Cliks	4:36
10.	"Walk Like an Egyptian"	The Puppini Sisters	2:42
11.	"Strawberry Street"	Lili Haydn	4:35
12.	"Their Cell"	Girl in a Coma	5:30
Total length:			46:48
