= Assume Vivid Astro Focus =

Group of visual and performance artists

- Occupation: Art collective
- Known for: Contemporary art Site-specific art
- Movement: Contemporary art Conceptual art

assume vivid astro focus (avaf) is both an alias of Brazilian-born New York-based artist Eli Sudbrack, and the name of an international group of visual and performance artists, with French multimedia artist Christophe Hamaide-Pierson one of the main collaborators. Sudbrack was born in 1968 and moved to New York in 1998.

He first exhibited in New York in 2000, at which time he used the name Superastrolab, switching to assume vivid astro focus in 2001, the name always rendered in lowercase. avaf's work includes painting, drawing, photography, film, and digital technology.

Artists collaborating in assume vivid astro focus projects have included: Kenny Scharf, Shoplifter; Michael Lazarus, Melissa Stabile de Mello, Fábio Gurjão, Desi Santiago, Kleber Matheus, Giles Round, Malcolm Stuart, Honeygun Labs (Bec Stupak), Rick Castro; Vava Dudu, Carla Machado, Renata Abbade, Rodrigo Garcia Dutra, JK5 (Joseph Ari Aloi), Pipa Ambrogi, Marco Boggio Sella, Cibelle, Carolina Gold, Black Meteoric Star (a.k.a. Gavin Russom), Silvia Moraes, and Melissa Stabile de Mello.

avaf has been featured in Artforum, Frieze, Flash Art, L'Uomo Vogue, V Magazine, and W Magazine. A catalogue was published by the Whitney Museum of American Art for the 2004 Whitney Biennial.

avaf is based in New York and Paris, and is represented by John Connelly Presents, New York, and Peres Projects, Berlin/Los Angeles.

The name derives from two musical sources: Throbbing Gristle's album Assume Power Focus, and the band Ultra Vivid Scene.

== Collections (selection) ==
avaf is included in the permanent collection of the Museum of Modern Art, New York, the Judith Rothschild Foundation Contemporary Drawing Collection, and the Pérez Art Museum Miami, Florida, among others.

== Exhibitions ==
Recent avaf collective exhibitions include:

- Tropicália, curated by Carlos Basualdo, Museum of Contemporary Art, Chicago, Barbican Arts Centre, London, UK, Bronx Museum of the Arts, Bronx, New York
- Trial Ballons/Globos Sonda, curated by Yuko Hasegawa, Agustin Pérez Rubio, and Octavio Zaya, MUSAC, León, Spain
- Infinite Painting, curated by Francesco Bonami and Sarah Cosulich, Villa Manin Centre for Contemporary Art, Codroipo, Italy.
- "absolutely venomous accurately fallacious (Naturally Delicious)," Deitch Projects, New York
- "In Living Contact," 28th São Paulo Biennial, curated by Ivo Mesquita, São Paulo, Brazil
- "FAUX DARK SHADA RUSTIC MONIQUES," Hiromi Yoshii Gallery. Tokyo, Japan
- "Museum of Contemporary Art Tokyo. Tokyo, Japan
- "Destroy Athens," Athens Biennial, Athens, Greece
- "a very anxious feeling," John Connelly Presents, New York
- "Abra Vana Allucinete Fogo," Casa Triangulo, São Paulo, Brazil
- "butch queen realness with a twist of pastel color," John Connelly Presents, New York, USA
- "Open Call," Kunsthalle Wien, Vienna, Austria
- "The Garden Party", Deitch Projects, New York
- "absorb viral attack fantasy", Hiromi Yoshii, Tokyo, Japan
- "assume vivid astro focus XVI", Galeria Massimo de Carlo (project space), Milan, Italy
- "Panic Room" works from the Dakis Joannou Collection, Deste Foundation Centre For Contemporary Art, Athens
- "Ecstasy: In and About Altered States," Museum of Contemporary Art, The Geffen Contemporary, Los Angeles, California
- "assume vivid astro focus XII", Tate Liverpool, Liverpool, England
- "assume vivid astro focus XIX", Hotel, London
- "assume vivid astro focus XX", Galerie Art: Concept
- "Off the Wall Series", Indianapolis Museum of Art, Indianapolis,
- "assume vivid astro focus XIV" (in collaboration with Elmgreen and Dragset), Galeria Massimo de Carlo, Milan, Fall/Winter, 2005
- "assume vivid astro focus XII", Tate Liverpool, Liverpool, England
- "ReACT: An Evening of Performance/A Day Without Art," group show featuring avaf as well as Reena Spaulings, Joan Jonas, AA Bronson, and Black Leotard Front; curated by Sheri L. Pasquarella, 2003, New York.

Sudbrack has had solo projects at:

- Massimo de Carlo Gallery, Milan, Italy
- Hiromi Yoshii Gallery, Tokyo, Japan
- Galeria Triangulo, São Paulo, Brazil
- Deitch Projects, New York
