= Into It =

Into It may refer to:

- "Into It" (Camila Cabello song), from her debut album Camila (2018)
- "Into It", song by Nels Cline Singers from the 2010 album Initiate
- "Into It", song by Robert Pollard from the 2011 album Space City Kicks

== See also ==
- Get Into It (disambiguation)
- Into It. Over It., indie rock solo project by Evan Thomas Weiss
