= Watch My Mouth =

Studio album by Cazwell
- Released: September 1, 2009
- Recorded: 2007–2009
- Genre: Rap, dance, electronica, house
- Label: Peace Bisquit/West End Records

Cazwell chronology
Get Into It (2006)	Watch My Mouth (2009)	Hard 2 B Fresh (2013)

Singles from Get Into It
- 1. "I Seen Beyoncé" Released: 2008; 2. "Tonight" Released: 2009; 3. "Get Into It" Released: 2010; 4. "Ice Cream Truck" Released: 2010; 5. "Get My Money Back" Released: 2011

Watch My Mouth is the second album by rapper Cazwell. Watch My Mouth is his first full-length album, with eight bonus tracks. Cazwell described the music of the album as "dance more than anything else. There are some hip hop elements, but I wouldn’t call it a hip hop album. All the songs are different because I worked with different producers. Ultimately it’s a lighthearted dance rap album."

Professional ratings
Review scores
Source	Rating
Slant Magazine	3.5/5 stars
About.com	4/5 stars

== Track listing ==
1. "Watch My Mouth" (3:05)
2. "Tonight" (3:25)
3. "All Over Your Face" (5:16)
4. "Get My Money Back" (feat. Lost Daze) (2:46)
5. "I Seen Beyoncé" (feat. Jonny Makeup) (3:17)
6. "Get Into It" (feat. Amanda Lepore) (3:59)
7. "I Buy My Socks On 14th Street" (3:29)
8. "The Sex That I Need" (3:46)
9. "Mission Possible" (feat. The Ones) (3:04)
10. "Knocked Out" (3:22)
11. "Limosine" (feat. Risqué) (2:59)
12. "Gettin' Over" (3:51)

Bonus tracks

1. "Spin That (Interlude)" (1:33)
2. "I Buy My Socks On 14th Street" (Old School Mix)" (3:22)
3. "Tonight" (Freestyle Mix) (2:56)
4. "Get My Money Back" (GoodandEvil Mix) (feat. Lost Daze) (2:48)
5. "Watch My Mouth" (Morgan Page Mix) (7:14)
6. "All Over Your Face" (Greasy Grimey Two Timey Mix) (5:50)
7. "I Seen Beyoncé" (Mixmaster F Hot Tracks Mix) (feat. Jonny Makeup) (5:09)

Online bonus track

"The Sex That I Need (Craig C's Master Mix)" which is 6:58 long was made available as a download digital bonus only.
