= Jonny Makeup =

American rapper

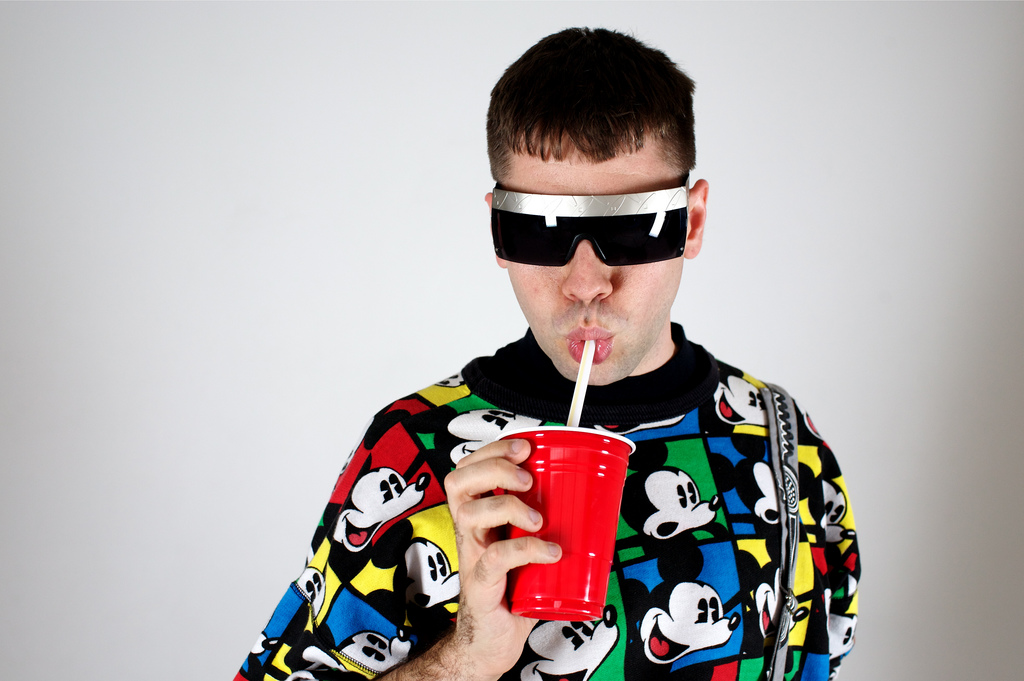

Background information
- Origin: Centralia, Pennsylvania
- Genre: Dance
- Occupations: singer, socialite, fashion

Jonny Makeup is an American socialite, musician and Internet personality. He got his start in the early 2000s as a nightlife performer and musician. This led to forays into the fashion industry, and appearances on E! Entertainment and Logo TV reality series.

== Career ==
Jonny Makeup was a member of the all gay homo hop group V.I.P. Party Boys. V.I.P. Party Boys appeared on the Cobra Starship song "Damn You Look Good And I'm Drunk (Scandalous)" off the album ¡Viva la Cobra!. In 2013 he released "DADT" about gays in the military. The band Gravy Train!!!! wrote a song about him called "Jonny Makeup." He provided vocals for the song "I Seen Beyonce at Burger King" with rapper Cazwell. He also recorded a single with well-known music producers Cory Nitta and Dallas Austin.

He is a writer for Street Carnage and Missbehave magazine.

He has appeared on The Girls Next Door as well as Kendra Wilkinson's spinoff series. He was taken in as an apprentice by Dov Charney of American Apparel and refers to him as his "daddy." He has gone on to be a designer and spokesperson for the firm. Makeup was featured in Todd Selby's The Selby Is in Your House and was photographed by paparazzi in Los Angeles with Peaches Geldof.

== Personal life ==
Makeup is gay, and many of his songs celebrate aspects of LGBTQ culture.
