= Dike Blair =

American visual artist

- Born: 1952 (age 73–74); New Castle, Pennsylvania, United States
- Education: School of the Art Institute of Chicago, University of Colorado Boulder, Skowhegan School of Painting and Sculpture
- Known for: Painting, sculpture, installation
- Style: Realist, abstract, conceptual
- Awards: Guggenheim Fellowship, American Academy in Rome
- Website: Dike Blair

Dike Blair (born 1952) is a New York-based artist, writer and teacher. His art consists of two parallel bodies of work: intimate, photorealistic paintings and installation-like sculptures assembled from common objects—often exhibited together—which examine overlooked and unexceptional phenomena of daily existence in both a romantic and ironic manner. Blair emerged out of the late 1970s New York art scene, and his work relates to concurrent movements such as the Pictures Generation, Minimalism and conceptual art, while remaining distinct from and tangential to them. New York Times critic Roberta Smith places his sculpture in a "blurred category" crossing "Carl Andre with ikebana, formalist abstraction with sleek anonymous hotel rooms, talk-show sets with home furnishings showrooms." Cameron Martin writes in Artforum that the paintings are "rendered with a lucidity that extracts something metaphysical from the mundane."

== Early career ==
Blair was born in 1952 in New Castle, Pennsylvania. He studied art at the Skowhegan School of Painting and Sculpture, Whitney Museum independent study program, and University of Colorado, Boulder, and earned an MFA from School of the Art Institute of Chicago in 1977. He was part of the late 1970s New York art scene, performing at CBGB (1976) and frequenting art bars like Magoo’s, The Mudd Club and Barnabus Rex. His early artwork consisted of abstract, formalist wall works made of acrylics and enamels poured and sprayed onto paper, Masonite and glass.

In the early 1980s, he began—somewhat ironically—painting small, illusionistic gouaches of sailboats, initially from observation or memory, akin to Sunday painting. He eventually integrated them into wall constructions, shown at Baskerville + Watson (1986) and Cash/Newhouse (1987). This work evolved into more widely known installations, such as his 1991 show at Ealan Wingate, based around photographs he took at Disney's Epcot. The show featured mixed-media images installed in a darkened room scored to Muzak, and decorated and carpeted in mauve with plants and suburban benches; reviews described it, alternately, as suffused with loss and nostalgia, soothing, and surprisingly spiritual.

Dike Blair, Untitled, Gouache, pastel and pencil on paper, 12" x 9", 2016.

Blair's work has been shown at the Whitney Museum, Secession (Vienna), Weatherspoon Art Museum, Museum of Contemporary Art Los Angeles, and Centre Pompidou; it belongs to the collections of the Whitney, Brooklyn Museum, and Los Angeles County Museum of Art, among others. He received a Guggenheim Fellowship in 2009 and the Rome Prize from the American Academy in Rome in 2010. He lives in New York with his wife, costume designer Marie Abma.

== Work and critical reception ==
Blair's two bodies of work serve as counterpoints and foils for one another in regard to composition, color, texture and theme. His realistic, deadpan paintings (primarily untitled, painted in gouache, and derived from his own snapshots) are more literal, yet illusionistic; the Postminimal, installation-like sculpture is abstract, but concrete and painterly. Together they investigate oppositions and liminal spaces—between nature and architecture, inside and outside, fullness and emptiness—and themes including pleasure and boredom, escapism and transcendence, and the intersection of designed environments, mass experience and desire.

Dike Blair, to want to, Painted wood, carpet, rubber mat, fluorescent fixtures, vinyl, Duratrans, 22" (h) x 150" (w) x 92" (d), 2005.

Blair's earlier gouaches focus on diaristic, largely American scenes (bedside set-ups, cocktails, cigarette butt-littered ashtrays, soda cans, VHS tapes) and anodyne transitory environments (motels, lounges, lobbies, Las Vegas, Disneyland) that Roberta Smith characterizes as background and details at "the edges of a sophisticated, travel-weary terrain." Village Voice critic Jerry Saltz writes that the paintings combine "a draftsman's attention to fact, a botanist's eye for type, and a detective's feel for telling clues," resulting in a no-man's-land genre "between illustration, photography, and forensic science." He likens the paintings to work by Richard Prince and Vija Celmins, while others make comparisons to the light and illusionism of Vermeer and the solitude of Edward Hopper. In later paintings, Blair turned to landscape, close-cropped flower images, views through obscured windows, and in the 2000s, to close-ups of eyes and nocturnal parking lots and snow scenes. Christopher Knight describes these later works largely devoid of people as "brimming over with unconquerable wanderlust."

In the mid-1990s, Blair began producing décor-like works inspired by contemporary corporate and domestic design and guided by Japanese flower arrangement rules. They compress installation-work elements of light, material, color and image into discrete, hybrid sculptures that evoke interiors, furniture, drawing, architecture, landscapes and the human body. Blair carefully manipulates elements such as electrical cords unfurling like lines across color-fields of industrial carpet, Plexiglas and plywood, lightboxes, shipping crates and lamps, seeking a balance in which objects retain their specificity yet read together as singular works. Paralleling his gouaches, the earlier sculptures examine themes involving atmosphere, designed space and consumer culture, while his post-2006 works take up phenomenological issues relating to the body, such as ocular versus corporeal experience of images, objects and space.

=== Later exhibitions ===
Blair's exhibitions at Feature (2001, 2004) and Mary Goldman (2005) inclined toward increasingly spare, refined presentation. They paired gouache paintings of lyrical water-streaked windows and flowers with electrical cord and geometric carpet lengths, glowing boxes and low-slung Minimalist objects, creating spaces that reviews describe as calming, mysterious and melancholic domestic tableaux (e.g. Some Of and And When, 2001; to want to, 2005). The Brooklyn Rail compared the effect of these exhibitions to the ambient music of artists such as Brian Eno, "tastefully calibrating" momentary experience, while remaining ambivalent about the consequences for subjectivity of living in a thoroughly designed world.

Dike Blair, Untitled, Oil on aluminum panel, 24" x 18", 2018.

In the later 2000s, Blair placed greater emphasis on perceptual issues, introducing close-up paintings of women's eyes and painted shipping crates that simultaneously evoke functional objects, picture planes, space dividers, walls and figures. For the survey, "Dike Blair: Now and Again" (Weatherspoon Art Museum, 2009), he produced a subtly staged and lit experience involving two sculpture courts—mirror layouts to one another invoking the space in its entirety—that flanked a series of galleries housing his gouaches; Artforum described the show as an intimate and uncanny meditation on experiencing versus seeing, real versus illusionistic space. In exhibitions at Gagosian (2010], Feature (2013), Linn Lühn (2014) and Jürgen Becker Gallery (2017), Blair continued to expand the range of allusions and effects, painting crate-sculpture sides like pebbled-glass windows (Those and These, 2010), benday-dot print patterns sometimes suggesting peepholes (Dance, Dance, Dance, 2011), and minimal intimations of skies and landscapes (OHCE, 2014), which he adorned with paintings of eyes, interiors and other subjects.

In 2017, Blair suspended his work on sculpture and took up oil painting. The subjects of those paintings are consistent which his gouaches—sometimes the same image—but the oils have a different physicality, including very slight impasto and intaglio. Around the same time, he began producing drawings, something that had not previously been part of his practice.

== Other professional activities ==
Blair's professional activities include writing and teaching. He has contributed articles and reviews to Artforum, ARTnews, Art Press, Bomb, Harpers, and Parkett, and served as contributing and associate editor for the Parisian magazine Purple, writing about design, music, technology, film, art and architecture. He has also written the books Again: Selected Interviews and Essays (2007) and Punk (1978, with Isabelle Anscomber). Blair taught in the painting department at Rhode Island School of Design from 1997 to 2017, as well as at Art Institute of Boston, New York University, and University of Las Vegas.

== Awards and public collections ==
Blair has received a John S. Guggenheim Fellowship (2009), the American Academy in Rome Prize (2010), and fellowships from the Louis Comfort Tiffany Foundation (1995) and Mid-Atlantic Arts Foundation/National Endowment for the Arts (1988). His work belongs to the public collections of the Whitney Museum, Brooklyn Museum, Los Angeles County Museum of Art, Dallas Museum of Art, Musee Des Beaux Arts La Chaux De Fonds (Switzerland), MUMOK (Vienna), Museum of Contemporary Art Los Angeles, Portland Art Museum, and Weatherspoon Art Museum, among others.
