= Todd Selby =

American photographer

- Education: University of California, Berkeley
- Occupations: photographer, illustrator, film maker, author
- Years active: 2001 - present
- Known for: Photography, Illustration and Film Making
- Website: theselby.com

Todd Selby is a photographer, illustrator, and author. He is known for his photographs of the interiors of homes.

== Education ==
Selby attended University of California, Berkeley where he graduated with a Bachelor of Arts in Development Studies Summa Cum Laude, Phi Beta Kappa.

== Work ==
Selby's photography is featured on his website, TheSelby.com. His work often portrays the homes of musicians, designers, and actors. Work published on the site aims to capture people in their creative spaces. Selby generally photographs interiors in their day-to-day state, as opposed to staging them. Selby started the project because of his curiosity about the ways personal space reflects personality. Abrams has published three coffee-table books of his photography. Selby has also collaborated with Apple, Nike, and other brands.

Selby is a self-described maximalist.

== Bibliography ==
- The Selby Is in Your Place, 2010. ISBN 9780810984868
- Edible Selby, 2012. ASIN B01FIZ0I3U
- Fashionable Selby, 2014. ISBN 1419708619
