= Cameron Martin (artist) =

American artist (born 1970)

- Born: 1970 (age 55–56); Seattle, Washington, U.S.
- Education: Brown University
- Occupation: Artist

Cameron Martin (born 1970) is an American contemporary artist. He is the co-chair of the Painting Department at the Milton Avery Graduate School of the Arts at Bard College. He lives and works in Brooklyn, New York.

== Early life and education ==
Martin was born in Seattle, Washington, in 1970. He received a B.A. in Art and Semiotics from Brown University in 1994. He continued his studies at the Whitney Independent Study Program in 1996. In the early 90s, Martin maintained a short career as a professional skateboarder. In 1990-1991, he belonged to the Bones Brigade, a team that notably included Tony Hawk, Rodney Mullen, and Steve Caballero.

== Work ==
Martin first became known for his depictions of meticulously rendered landscape paintings informed by semiotics. In a conversation between the artist Amy Sillman and Martin, Sillman notes that, “It is almost impossible to know whether they are paintings or screen prints, or printed prints, or prints with paintings over them”. Where the image exists, and how it exists, are questions repeatedly asked in Martin’s work.

In an essay by the artist Dike Blair on Martin’s work, he describes the relationship to time, and the unfolding events within the image, he writes, “like all of Martin’s, [they] are steeped in romanticism; yet just as clearly they are products of an analytic eye and mind, and a trained and restrained hand".

In 2014, Martin’s paintings pivoted towards abstraction. Martin's work in abstraction has been cited as painting “committed to the experience of painting, with unorthodox techniques, and mesmerizing surfaces.” Martin's current paintings explore the aesthetic of virtual technologies, drawing comparisons to Op Art, and the light patterns of contemporary electronic devices such as portable screens, tablets, and smart phones.

== Exhibition history ==
In 2004, Martin’s work was exhibited in the Whitney Biennial. Institutional exhibitions include the Philbrook Museum of Art, the Saint Louis Art Museum, and most recently in 2017 at the University Art Museum at SUNY Albany. Martin’s solo show at the University Art Museum in Albany in 2017 exhibited his recent turn towards abstraction.

== Collections ==
- Cleveland Museum of Art, Ohio
- Seattle Art Museum, Washington
- Minneapolis Institute of Art, Minnesota
- Saint Louis Art Museum, Missouri
- U.S. State Department Art Bank Program, Washington DC
- The Whitney Museum of American Art, New York

== Recognition ==
- Guggenheim Fellowship (2010)
- Joan Mitchell Foundation Fellowship (2008)
- Pollock-Krasner Foundation award (2000)
- Artists at Giverny Fellowship and Residency in Giverny, France (2001)
