= Amanda Lepore =

American model, singer and performance artist

- Lepore in 2024
- Born: November 21, 1967 (age 58) Cedar Grove, New Jersey, U.S.
- Occupations: Model; Socialite; Singer; Performance artist; LGBTQ+ activist
- Years active: 1989–present
- Modeling information
- Height: 5 ft 2 in (1.57 m)
- Hair color: Platinum blonde
- Eye color: Brown
- Website: amandalepore.com

Amanda Lepore (born November 21, 1967) is an American model, singer, and performance artist. A former Club Kid, she has appeared in advertising for numerous companies. Lepore is noted as a regular subject in photographer David LaChapelle's work, serving as his muse, as well as many other photographers, such as Terry Richardson and Ruben van Schalm. She participated in LaChapelle's Artists and Prostitutes 1985–2005 exhibit in New York City, where she "lived" in a voyeuristic, life-sized set.

Lepore has released several singles, many written by and/or recorded with gay rapper and singer Cazwell. In 2011, she released her debut studio album, I...Amanda Lepore, on Peace Bisquit.

== Early life ==
Amanda grew up in the Essex County community of Cedar Grove, New Jersey, with one sibling, an older brother. Her father was an Italian-American chemical engineer, and her mother was a German-American housewife. Her mother was diagnosed with schizophrenia, and spent considerable time in psychiatric hospitals. Lepore later wrote, "Ever since I can first remember, I knew I was a girl. I couldn't understand why my parents were dressing me up in boys' clothing. I thought they were insane."

When she was 15 years old, Lepore befriended a transgender dancer named Bambi. Realizing she was transgender from an early age, Lepore began sewing costumes for Bambi in exchange for female hormones. Having already grown isolated from her peers and schooling, Lepore's parents withdrew her from public school and hired a private tutor. They also took her to a psychologist, who successfully helped her obtain a prescription to begin hormone therapy.

At the age of 17, and through a legal loophole, Lepore married a male bookstore owner. She was granted permission for gender-affirming surgery, which she underwent at the age of 19, in Yonkers, New York.

In the early 1990s, Lepore intended to establish herself as an iconic nightlife figure (including becoming a key member of the Club Kids). She supported herself by working in a nail salon, as a part-time dominatrix, and later as a cosmetics salesgirl for Patricia Field. After meeting photographer David LaChapelle one evening, while hosting at Bowery Bar, she began collaborating with him and became a ‘muse’ of sorts for his work.

== Modeling and acting ==
Lepore has had cameos in music videos for artists including Elton John, Thalía, the Dandy Warhols, Girl in a Coma, Grace Jones, Keanan Duffty, Sharon Needles, TIGA (for his cover of "Sunglasses at Night"), and the alt rock band the Drums (for "Days"). Lepore appears in many of Cazwell's music videos, including "Watch my Mouth" and "All Over Your Face".

She was Chief of Parade at the 2010 Sydney Gay and Lesbian Mardi Gras in Australia.

== Music ==
In 2005, Lepore released her first album, Introducing... Amanda Lepore, which contained "Champagne" and "My Hair Looks Fierce". In 2007, she released two remix albums, Fierce Pussy and My Pussy E.P. Lepore performed the main title for Another Gay Movie, "I Know What Boys Like" and "Cotton Candy" from the soundtrack of Another Gay Sequel.

Lepore was a part of True Colors Tour 2007, a 15-city North American benefit tour sponsored by the Logo channel, hosted by comedian Margaret Cho and headlined by Cyndi Lauper. The tour benefited the Human Rights Campaign, PFLAG and the Matthew Shepard Foundation, and it included Erasure, Debbie Harry, the Gossip, Rufus Wainwright, the Dresden Dolls, the MisShapes, Rosie O'Donnell, Indigo Girls, the Cliks, and other special guests. In 2009, Lepore performed at the Majestic Theatre during Metro Pride Fest in Detroit with The Divas of the Majestic: A Divine Lites Productions and Founder, Electra Lites.

In June 2011, Lepore released her full-length album I...Amanda Lepore at the Highline Ballroom with Cazwell, Kat DeLuna, Neon Hitch, Ana Matronic, Jonté, and many others. Her debut full-length album I...Amanda Lepore was released in 2011 on Peace Bisquit.

In 2014, Lepore was featured on drag performer Sharon Needles' single, "I Wish I Were Amanda Lepore", and she guest starred in the music video for the track, depicting Needles as a fan obsessed with getting plastic surgery to look like her.

== Merchandise ==
In October 1999, Swatch released "Time Tranny", a watch designed by LaChapelle with Lepore on the face, which displays a printed crack on the glass and marble stripes as the background. A second version displays no cracked glass and a blue and yellow striped background.

In April 2006, Integrity Toys launched an Amanda Lepore doll produced by Jason Wu as a benefit for AIDS charities.

Lepore has a line of cosmetics in partnership with CAMP Cosmetics, called "Collection Lepore", as well as a signature perfume.

== Filmography ==
=== Television ===
Year	Title	Role	Notes
1990	The Joan Rivers Show	Self	Guest; 1 episode
1993	The Joan Rivers Show	Self	Guest; 1 episode
2019	The Boulet Brothers' Dragula	Guest judge	Season 3, Episode 2 (aired September 3)
2019	Queen of Drags	Guest judge	Season 1, Episode 2 (aired November 21)
2020	The Real Housewives of New York City	Self	Season 12, Episode 5 (aired April 30)

== Discography ==
=== Studio albums ===
List of studio albums, with selected chart positions, sales figures, and certifications
Title	Album details	Certifications
I...Amanda Lepore	Released: June 28, 2011; Label: Peace Bisquit; Formats: CD, digital download	
I...Amanda Lepore – Make over sessions	Released: July 31, 2015; Label: Peace Bisquit; Format: Digital download; Includes 2 digital CDs; Remix album; Has 2 official covers	

=== EPs ===
Year	Album
2005	Introducing... Amanda Lepore: Released: September 21, 2005; Formats: Digital download
2007	My Pussy: Released: 2007; Formats: Digital download
2008	Fierce Pussy (The Remix Album): Released: June 1, 2008; Formats: CD, digital download
2010	Cazwell and Amanda: Released: October 26, 2010; Formats: Digital download
2018	Lepore.: Released: February 16, 2018; Formats: Digital download

=== Singles ===
Year	Title	Album
2006	"I Know What Boys Like"	Another Gay Movie Soundtrack
2009	"Cotton Candy"	I...Amanda Lepore
2009	"My Hair Looks Fierce"	I...Amanda Lepore

== Videography ==
Music videos
Year	Title	Artist	Director	Notes
2002	“¿A quién le importa?”	Thalia	Jeb Brien	
2009	"Cotton Candy"	Amanda Lepore featuring Cazwell	Bec Stupak	
2010	"Marilyn"	Cazwell featuring Amanda Lepore	Leo Herrera	
2010	"Get Into It"	Cazwell featuring Amanda Lepore	Marco Ovando	
2011	"Turn Me Over"	Amanda Lepore	Marco Ovando	
2011	"Doin It My Way"		Marco Ovando	
2012	"Doin It My Way" Remix		Sid Licious	
2019	"Johanna"	Suki Waterhouse	Émilie Richard-Froozan	
2020	"Nerves of Steel"	Erasure	Brad Hammer	

== See also ==
- Conceptual art
- LGBTQ culture in New York City
- List of LGBTQ people from New York City
