= Tyler Vlahovich =

American contemporary artist

Tyler Vlahovich (born 1967) is an American contemporary artist known for his abstract paintings and works on paper.

== Early life and education ==
Tyler Vlahovich was born in 1967 in Tacoma, Washington, United States. He earned his Bachelor of Fine Arts (BFA) degree from the California Institute of the Arts (CalArts) in Valencia, California, in 1989. During his time at CalArts, Vlahovich developed a foundation in abstract art, which would become central to his artistic practice.

== Career ==
Vlahovich’s paintings and works on paper are characterized by seemingly casual yet richly sophisticated meditations on mark-making and composition. His work resists easy categorization, avoiding a single identifiable style while maintaining a distinctive sensibility. Often described as rapid, playful, and unpredictable, his art embraces ambiguity and open-ended interpretation.

His paintings have been noted for their vivid and offbeat qualities, offering viewers unexpected pictorial experiences that engage both the eye and the body. In contrast to art that strives for immediate clarity, Vlahovich’s work stands out for its refusal to conform.

Vlahovich had his first Los Angeles solo at Goldman Tevis in 2001. He went on to have three exhibitions with Feature Inc in 2003, 2006, and 2012 and is now represented by Chris Sharp Gallery.
