= Jimi Dams =

Jimi Dams (born June 1963) is a Belgian-American contemporary artist.

== Early life ==
Dams started drawing from a young age. He studied at the Academy of Fine Arts in Antwerp, Belgium but eventually moved on to Brussels to continue his studies. He worked primarily with Belgian minimalist Luc Claus and graduated summa cum laude in 1984.

== Career ==
=== 1986–1990 ===
Dams’ first solo exhibition PunkMe (1986), Jordaenshuis, Antwerp, featured linocut portraits evocative of his life in the underground Punk scene.

Inspired by British post-punk ballet dancer Michael Clark, Dams started exploring movement as a subject matter for his work. A series of drawings and linocuts, featuring Clark, was exhibited in MOve (1987) an exhibition at Harrods, London. He went on to explore movement in series with dancers.

In 1988, Dams’ artwork moved towards drawings, murals and installations. During that time, he also began to develop a strong interest in collaborating with other artists. His work with writer Tom Lanoye, Cocktale (1988), was the first in a series of collaborations with artists from different disciplines such as writer Peter Verhelst, artist Amanda Lear, novelist and poet Dennis Cooper, curator Joshua Compston and artist Devon Dikeou (Zingmagazine).

The first book on the artist’s work, 78 Linos (1990), was published by De Carbolineum Pers, Belgium.

=== 1990–2004 ===
In 1991, Dams was the subject of a RTBF (French Belgian public service Radio and Television) documentary. He continued to exhibit throughout Europe. After his LR.Lear (1993) exhibition at Galérie Oz, Paris, galleries such as Gracie Mansion, New York, Torch, Amsterdam and Galerie S&H De Buck, Ghent started representing his work. In 1997, Dams’ ANP exhibition at S&H De Buck gallery, Ghent, was featured on BRTN (Dutch Belgian public service Radio and Television). An interview for Studio Brussel (Dutch Belgian radio) aired the same year.

From 1991 on, Dams’ work has been exhibited in museums in Belgium, The Netherlands, Germany, Austria, the U.S. and China as well as in art galleries worldwide.

== Envoy enterprises ==
=== 2005–present ===
In 2005, Dams opened envoy enterprises, an independent contemporary art space, in Manhattan. Currently located in New York’s Lower East Side, in 2007, envoy enterprises was the first to leave the Chelsea Art district for the Lower East side.

In June 2017, ARTnews and Artforum reported the closing of envoy enterprises’ exhibition space. Dams addressed his disgust with the way the art world was evolving and announced that his exhibition program would, at some point, return albeit in a different format.

envoy enterprises continues to represent artists from its 87 Rivington Street address.
