= Get Into It (Cazwell album) =

Studio album by Cazwell
- Released: October 31, 2006 (digital); December 14, 2006 (retail)
- Recorded: 2005/2006
- Genre: Hip hop, dance, electronica, house
- Length: 26:25
- Label: West End Records
- Producer: Adam Cruz, Bill Coleman, Cazwell, Mel Cheren

Cazwell chronology
Get Into It (2006)	Watch My Mouth (2009)

Singles from Get Into It
- 1. "The Sex That I Need" Released: 2003; 2. "All Over Your Face" Released: 2006; 3. "Do You Wanna Break Up" Released: 2006; 4. "I Buy My Socks On 14th Street" Released: 2006; 5. "Watch My Mouth" Released: 2007

Get Into It is the first album by rapper Cazwell. The album can also be seen as an extended play or mini-album, since it consists of seven original songs and eight remixes. Copies bought from his official website could also be autographed by him if the purchaser chose.

To celebrate the release, Clubplanet threw a release party. Cazwell celebrated the release of the album with a live performance featuring Avenue D and Amanda Lepore who also contributed to the album.

Professional ratings
Review scores
Source	Rating
On Top Magazine	Positive
About.com	4.5/5 stars
Slant Magazine	3.5/5 stars

== Track listing ==
1. "I Buy My Socks on 14th Street" (3:29)
2. "Watch My Mouth" (3:05)
3. "The Sex That I Need" (feat. Avenue D) (3:46)
4. "All Over Your Face" (5:16)
5. "Do You Wanna Break Up" (2:51)
6. "Getting' Over" (3:51)
7. "Get Into It" (feat. Amanda Lepore) 3:59
8. "I Buy My Socks On 14th Street" (Old School Mix) (3:23)
9. "All Over Your Face" (Extended Disco Vocal Mix) (5:16)
10. "All Over Your Face" (Funky Junction & Antony Reale Subliminal Reprise Twisted Dub Mix) (7:31)
11. "All Over Your Face" (Gomi's West 22nd Street Mix) (5:54)
12. "All Over Your Face" (Craig C. Club Mix) (7:30)
13. "Watch My Mouth" (Instrumental) (3:06)
14. "The Sex That I Need" (Instrumental) (3:49)
15. "All Over Your Face" (Extended Disco Instrumental) (5:19)
