= Richard Rezac =

American sculptor (born 1952)

Richard Rezac (born 1952) is an American sculptor based in Chicago, Illinois. Since the mid-1980s, he has produced abstract, object-based sculptures characterized by a process-oriented approach that often begins with drawing and emphasizes formal reduction.

== Early life and education ==
Rezac was born in Lincoln, Nebraska in 1952. He received a Bachelor of Fine Arts from the Pacific Northwest College of Art in 1974 and a Master of Fine Arts from the Maryland Institute College of Art in 1982.

== Work ==
Rezac’s sculptural practice frequently begins with drawing and develops through a process of refinement and reduction. His works are typically abstract and modest in scale, focusing on relationships between proportion, surface, and spatial arrangement. His work has been discussed in relation to postminimal and conceptual approaches to sculpture, particularly in its emphasis on perception and material presence.

== Career ==
Rezac has exhibited widely since the 1980s. His solo exhibitions include presentations at the Renaissance Society at the University of Chicago and the Blaffer Art Museum at the University of Houston.

Additional institutional exhibitions have been held at the Portland Art Museum and the Museum of Contemporary Art Chicago, where his work was featured in the Options series.

Rezac has participated in group exhibitions at institutions including the Art Institute of Chicago, the Smart Museum of Art, the Indianapolis Museum of Art, and the Yale University Art Gallery.

== Critical reception ==
Rezac’s work has been discussed in relation to postminimalism and conceptual abstraction in American sculpture. In Art in Chicago: A History from the Fire to Now, his practice is situated within a broader context of artists engaged with reductive form and perceptual inquiry.

Exhibition catalogues and institutional texts have described his work as developing through incremental adjustments that emphasize relationships between form, surface, and space.

Scholarly writing has also noted the role of drawing as a structural component in his practice and the use of subtle variations in scale and proportion.

== Collections ==
Rezac’s work is held in the collections of the Art Institute of Chicago the Carnegie Museum of Art, the Yale University Art Gallery, and the Astrup Fearnley Museet

== Awards and honors ==
Rezac has received several awards and fellowships, including:

- John Simon Guggenheim Memorial Foundation Fellowship (1989);
- Rome Prize Fellowship, American Academy in Rome (2006);
- Joan Mitchell Foundation Grant (2004);
- Louis Comfort Tiffany Foundation Award (1993).

== Teaching ==
Rezac served as Adjunct Full Professor at the School of the Art Institute of Chicago from 1985 to 2019, where he taught in both the Painting and Sculpture departments.

== Publications ==
- Address (Renaissance Society, 2018)
- Learning to Converse: Richard Rezac (Luhring Augustine, 2020)
- Richard Rezac: Sculpture 2003–2012 (West Virginia University, 2012)
