= B. Wurtz =

American painter and sculptor (born 1948)

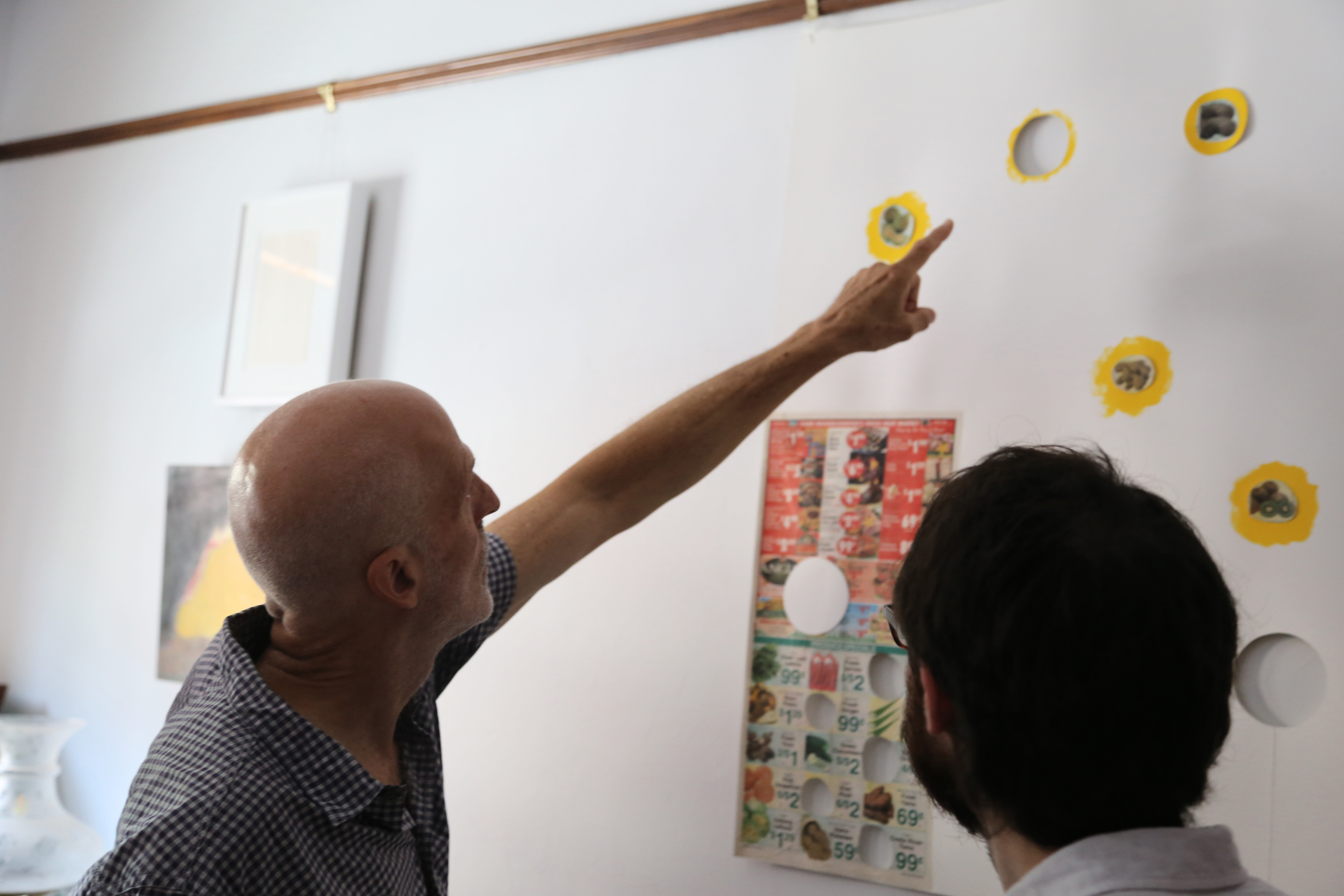
B Wurtz with New York Arts Practicum at his home

Bill Wurtz, known professionally as B. Wurtz (b. 1948, Pasadena, California), is an American painter and sculptor. He lives and works in New York City.

== Education ==
Wurtz received a BA from the University of California at Berkeley in 1970, and an MFA from the California Institute of the Arts in 1980.

== Work ==
Wurtz is known for his transformations of commonplace materials into sculptures. Wurtz's sculptures are characterized by an appreciation for the ubiquitous, common-place items he uses: plastic grocery bags, disposable baking trays, coat hangers, tuna tins, buttons, shoelaces, cardboard, and construction lumber.

Wurtz's work has been described as a "bricolage of found objects." He has shown his work widely in solo and group exhibitions internationally. He works in a variety of scales from small-scale sculptures to large-scale public sculptures. In 2015, The Baltic Centre for Contemporary Art in Gateshead, United Kingdom mounted a retrospective exhibition of the artist's work that traveled to La Casa Encendida in Madrid through 2016. In 2018, the Institute of Contemporary Art in Los Angeles mounted a major solo exhibition of his work, This Has No Name.

His work has been reviewed in the New York Times, Artsy, Surface, Artforum, Frieze, among other publications.

== Collections ==
Wurtz's work is represented in the permanent collections of the Whitney Museum of American Art, the Museum of Contemporary Art, Chicago, the Portland Art Museum, among others.
