= Bec Stupak =

Bec Stupak Diop
- Born: 1977 (age 48–49); Brooklyn, New York
- Known for: VJ, Performance, and Video Art

Bec Stupak Diop (born 1977) is an American video and performance artist and creative director. Her work uses collage, repetition and shifting fields of bright color to create psychedelic animations and films.

== Early life and education ==
Stupak Diop was born 1977 in the United States. She attended Princeton High School and graduated from Sarah Lawrence College. Early in her high school career she began working with VHS video and continued to develop skills in both shooting and editing video.

== Career ==
She got her start early on as a VJ at raves, performing around the world and as a regular performer at Lonnie Fischer's Ultraworld events at the D.C. Armory.

She was named Art Director of New Media at Atlantic Records in 2000 and remained there until 2003, creating online content and overseeing websites for all Atlantic artists including Lil' Kim, T.I., Trick Daddy, Jewel, Brandy and many others. Stupak Diop started working with the New York based collective Assume Vivid Astro Focus in 2002. Their first collaboration was Freebird, which was quickly followed by Walking on Thin Ice. In 2004, the collective was featured in the Whitney Biennial.

Stupak Diop's first solo show, "Radical Earth Magic Flower", premiered in 2006 at Deitch Projects gallery in New York. The show featured a number of videos including her blind remake of Jack Smith's 1962 cult classic Flaming Creatures.

Stupak Diop returned to Deitch Projects in 2007 for a one night engagement along with The Dazzle Dancers to premiere their music video collaboration "The Love Boat". Also in 2007, Stupak began a collaboration with the Joshua Light Show, which was originally the house lightshow at the Fillmore East in the 1960s.

In 2008, Stupak Diop created a video for MAC Cosmetics in collaboration with Fafi. In 2009 Stupak Diop performed the role of Earthlight Player in Ang Lee's "Taking Woodstock" and also contributed titles and a montage sequence to Lady Gaga's "Alejandro" music video, directed by Steven Klein.

In 2012, Stupak Diop became the founding creative director of online beauty retail startup Beautylish and later re-joined the Beautylish team when they created the skin care brand Good Molecules in 2019.

In 2019, she was invited to a 3-month stay at Kehinde Wiley's Black Rock Senegal, prior to the official opening in May 2019.

In Senegal, she met her husband, the Senegalese percussionist Aba Diop, and after several years together, became his manager.

== Personal life ==
Stupak Diop married Aba Diop in 2022. They are co-parents with Diop's son's mother, the Senegalese singer Seynabou Ngom.
