= The Remix Game =

Remix album by Bitter:Sweet
- Released: August 7, 2007
- Genre: Trip hop
- Label: Quango
- Producer: Kiran Shahani, Shana Halligan

Bitter:Sweet chronology
The Mating Game (2006)	The Remix Game (2007)	Drama (2008)

Professional ratings
Review scores
Source	Rating
Allmusic	3.5/5 stars

The Remix Game is a 2007 album by Bitter:Sweet. The album is a reworking of Bitter:Sweet’s debut, The Mating Game by various remix producers. Many of the album's songs were previously difficult to obtain or were only available on 12" or digitally.

The artists involved in remixing the album include: Thievery Corporation, AtJazz, Skeewiff, Nicola Conte, and Fort Knox Five.

== Track listing ==
All songs by Shana Halligan and Kiran Shahani.

1. "Heaven" [Nicola Conte "West Coast Vibes" Remix] - 6:07
2. "Bittersweet Faith" [Thievery Corporation Remix] - 3:58
3. "Overdue" [Blackbeard Remix] - 5:09
4. "Our Remains" [Jab Featuring Menez One Remix] - 4:07
5. "Take 2 Blue" [Roy Dubb Remix] - 3:41
6. "The Mating Game" [Yes King Remix] - 5:22
7. "Salty Air" [Fort Knox Five Remix] - 4:17
8. "Dirty Laundry" [Skeewiff Remix] - 4:55
9. "Moving Forward" [Atjazz Remix] - 6:26
10. "Moody" [Marsmobil Remix] - 5:31
11. "Don't" Forget to Breathe [Solid Doctor "Don't Forget the Beat" Remix] - 5:26
