= Dirty Laundry =

Dirty laundry (or dirty linen) refers to embarrassing private matters that one would prefer not be made public. More literally it may refer to clothes that need to be laundered.

Dirty Laundry may also refer to:

== Music ==
- Dirty Laundry (album), an Ian Hunter album
- "Dirty Laundry" (All Time Low song)
- "Dirty Laundry" (Bitter:Sweet song)
- "Dirty Laundry" (Blackbear song)
- "Dirty Laundry" (Carrie Underwood song)
- "Dirty Laundry" (Don Henley song)
- "Dirty Laundry" (Kelly Rowland song)

== Film and television ==
- Dirty Laundry (1996 film), a 1996 comedy film
- Dirty Laundry (2006 film), a 2006 drama film
- Dirty Laundry (2012 film), a 2012 Punisher fan film
- Dirty Laundry Live, an Australian TV series
- Dirty Laundry (TV series), a New Zealand drama TV series featuring Matthew Walker
- Dirty Laundry (Thai TV series), a 2026 Thai television series
- "Dirty Laundry" (Charlie Jade), an episode of the television series Charlie Jade
- "Dirty Laundry" (Cow and Chicken), an episode of the television series Cow and Chicken
- Dirty Laundry, a game show on Dropout

== Other ==
- Dirty Laundry (comic), a comic created by Robert Crumb
- Just Dirty Laundry, a play by Thom Michael Mulligan
- "Dirty Laundry", a storyline in the science fiction comedy webtoon series Live with Yourself!

== See also ==
- Dirty Linen (disambiguation)
