= Parce que tu crois =

1966 song by Charles Aznavour

"Parce que tu crois" (French pronunciation: [paʁs kə ty kʁwa]; transl. "Because You Believe") is a song by Armenian-French singer Charles Aznavour. It was released on his 1966 albums La Bohème and Chante Paris au mois d'août.

== Use as sample and interpolation ==
The song has been sampled or interpolated by numerous music artists including:

- Youssou N'Dour on "Xale Rewmi" (1985)
- Dr. Dre on "What's the Difference" (feat. Eminem and Xzibit, 1999)
  - Blu Cantrell on "Breathe" (feat. Sean Paul, 2003) in turn interpolated "What's the Difference"
  - Olly Alexander on "Breathe", the cover of Blu Cantrell's song (2014)
- Wax Tailor on "Positively Inclined" (2003)
- Bitter:Sweet on "Dirty Laundry" (2006)
- Debout sur le Zinc in the album Les Promesses (2006)
- Koxie on "Garçon" (2007)
- Indila on "Dernière danse" (2013)
- Cro on "Bad Chick" (2014)
- Nikki Yanofsky on "Necessary Evil" (2014)
- Miles Kane on "Johanna" (soundtrack to the movie Mortdecai, 2015)
- Emancipator on "Time for Space" (2017)
- HUGEL on "WTF" (feat. Amber Van Day, 2018)
- Shaq on "Freestyle (Dame Dolla Diss)" (2019)
