= Hope & Sorrow =

Studio album by Wax Tailor
- Released: 2 April 2007
- Genre: Hip hop, electronic, downtempo
- Label: Lab'Oratoire, Le Plan, Blend Corp.
- Producer: Wax Tailor

Wax Tailor chronology
Tales of the Forgotten Melodies (2005)	Hope & Sorrow (2007)	In the Mood for Life (2010)

Singles from Hope & Sorrow
- 1. "To Dry Up / The Games You Play" Released: 20 March 2007; 2. "Positively Inclined / The Way We Lived" Released: 21 August 2007; 3. "We Be / There Is Danger" Released: 27 May 2008

Professional ratings
Review scores
Source	Rating
AllMusic	link
Okayplayer	link
PopMatters	7/10 stars

Hope & Sorrow is a full-length album by French hip hop producer Wax Tailor. It was released in 2007 on Lab'Oratoire, and licensed for release in North America by Le Plan and in Australia by Blend Corp.

== Track listing ==
#	Title	Length	Vocals
1	"Once upon a Past"	4:47	(Samples)
2	"The Way We Lived"	3:41	Sharon Jones
3	"The Games You Play"	4:13	Ursula Rucker
4	"The Tune"	2:57	(Samples)
5	"The Man with No Soul"	3:34	Charlotte Savary
6	"Radio Broadcast"	0:54	(Samples)
7	"Positively Inclined"	3:39	ASM (A State of Mind)
8	"Sometimes"	3:40	(Samples)
9	"House of Wax"	2:57	The Others
10	"Beyond Words"	1:01	(Samples)
11	"To Dry Up"	4:07	Charlotte Savary
12	"We Be"	5:08	Ursula Rucker
13	"That Case"	0:30	(Samples)
14	"There Is Danger"	3:31	(Samples)
15	"Alien in My Belly"	3:44	Charlotte Savary

== Credits ==
All tracks composed, sampled and programmed by JC Le Saout, mixed by JC Le Saout.

Additional musicians

- Marina Quaisse: Cello on "The Man with No Soul", "Positively Inclined", "To Dry Up"
- Bejamin Bouton: Guitar & Bass on "The Games You Play"
- Helene Cervero: Flute on "The Man with No Soul", "Positively Inclined", "To Dry Up", "There Is Danger"

Samples

- "Once upon a Past" contains a sample of "Can I Get an Amen" by Nate Harrison
- "The Tune" contains a sample of "Bye Bye Love" by The Everly Brothers
- "Beyond Words" contains a sample of "Black Coffee" by Rosemary Clooney
- "To Dry Up" contains a sample of "Mon Amour, Mon Ami" by Marie Laforêt
- "We Be" contains a sample of "Dem Niggers Ain't Playing" by the Watts Prophets
