= Duplicity (soundtrack) =

Duplicity (Original Motion Picture Soundtrack)

Film score by James Newton Howard
- Released: March 24, 2009
- Recorded: 2008–2009
- Studios: Sony Scoring Stage, Sony Pictures Studios, Culver City, California; Conway Recording Studios, Los Angeles; James Newton Howard Studios, Santa Monica, California
- Genre: Film score
- Length: 50:36
- Label: Varèse Sarabande
- Producer: James Newton Howard

James Newton Howard chronology
Confessions of a Shopaholic (2009)	Duplicity (2009)	The Last Airbender (2010)

Duplicity (Original Motion Picture Soundtrack) is the film score composed by James Newton Howard to the 2009 film Duplicity directed by Tony Gilroy starring Julia Roberts and Clive Owen. The original score was performed by the Hollywood Studio Symphony and conducted by Pete Anthony. The album was released on March 24, 2009, under the Varèse Sarabande label, and features Howard's score and the song "Being Bad" performed by the trip hop duo Bitter:Sweet.

== Track listing ==
All music is composed by James Newton Howard, except where noted.

No.	Title	Writer(s)	Artist(s)	Length
1.	"War"			4:06
2.	"Following Claire"			2:00
3.	"Security Meeting"			2:49
4.	"Split to Rome"			2:30
5.	"Tully's Letter"			1:52
6.	"The Ghost"			2:48
7.	"Rome Hotel"			1:38
8.	"Back to the Unit"			1:44
9.	"Split to London"			0:47
10.	"The Frame Up"			2:27
11.	"Split to Miami"			0:49
12.	"Miami Hotel"			1:02
13.	"Share My Fire"			1:27
14.	"Bench Mark"			0:36
15.	"Safe House"			2:19
16.	"Split to Cleveland"			0:48
17.	"The Formula"			5:50
18.	"San Diego Airport"			1:24
19.	"A Cream or a Lotion?"			1:40
20.	"Airport Love"			1:55
21.	"The Real Setup"			3:12
22.	"Played"			1:48
23.	"Duplicitá a Due"			2:05
24.	"Being Bad"	Shana Halligan; Kiran Shahani	Bitter:Sweet	3:00
Total length:				50:36

== Reception ==
Christian Clemmensen of Filmtracks noted that "the album's 50 minutes are extremely disjoined due to the inherent schizophrenia that exists because of the film's constantly shifting gears." Eric Schneider of AllMusic wrote "Howard forgoes an orchestral score and opts for a collection of songs that mix rock and world-beat sounds". Jonathan Broxton of Movie Music UK wrote "Although Duplicity is a world away from the sophisticated orchestral writing we are used to hearing from Howard in recent years, it has a certain je ne sais quoi that makes it a thoroughly enjoyable listening experience, especially for those whose tastes encompass jazz and world music as much as the classical style." James Southall of Movie Wave wrote "Decent though it is, personally I’d rather Howard stuck to just being himself."

Thomas Glorieux of Maintitles.net wrote "Basically there is nothing wrong with Duplicity. It is lovely, covers a bunch of highlights if you really love detail in your music and quite frankly, this is easy to like and listen to music. But we are not simple people. We want class in whatever score and we want the best in whatever situation. So in that regard Duplicity is just good and decent. If it would have deleted some 25 minutes of music, it would have even been a better experience." Todd McCarthy of Variety called it a "vibrant, nicely spiced score", while Simon Brew of Den of Geek described it "a bright score". David Edelstein of New York wrote "James Newton Howard's brassy score gives the illusion of momentum even when the frames are inert."

Tom Huddelston of Time Out wrote "James Newton Howard’s overbearing beats ’n’ strings soundtrack is never more than David Holmes-lite". Kimberley Jones of The Austin Chronicle noted it to be "aggressively frenetic". David Chen of /Film wrote "James Newton Howard's jazzy score for Duplicity even sounds similar to [John] Powell's [Mr. & Mrs] Smith score in more than one spot". Dana Stevens of Slate described it as a "witty retro-Hitchcock-ian score".

== Personnel ==
Credits adapted from liner notes:

- Music composer and producer – James Newton Howard
- Musical arrangements – Stuart Michael Thomas
- Auricle programming and control systems – Richard Grant
- Synth programming – Chris P. Bacon, Stuart Michael Thomas
- Pro-tools operator – Erik Swanson
- Sound engineer – Braden Kimball, Matt Ward
- Recording – Alan Meyerson, Ed Cherney
- Mixing – Alan Meyerson
- Mastering – Patricia Sullivan Fourstar
- Music editor – Erik Swanson, Nick Ratner, Mick Gormaley
- Music supervisor – Brian Ross
- Studio assistant – Cory Roberts
- Scoring crew – Adam Michalak, David Marquette, Greg Loskorn, Mark Eshelman, Seth Waldmann, Simon Heeger
- Copyist – Joann Kane Music Service
- Music librarian – Mark Graham
- Executive producer – Robert Townson

Orchestra

- Performer – Hollywood Studio Symphony
- Orchestrators – Brad Dechter, James Newton Howard, Jeff Atmajian, Pete Anthony
- Conductor – Pete Anthony
- Orchestra contractor – Peter Rotter, Sandy De Crescent
- Orchestra coordinator – Pamela Sollie
- Orchestra leader – Roger Wilkie

Instruments

- Brass – Jerry Hey
- Bandoneon – Marcelo Nisinman
- Bass – Bruce Morgenthaler, Christian Kollgaard, Drew Dembowski, Edward Meares, Michael Valerio, Nico Carmine Abondolo, Susan Ranney
- Cello – Andrew Shulman, Anthony Cooke, Armen Ksajikian, Cecilia Tsan, Chris Ermacoff, Dane Little, David Speltz, Dennis Karmazyn, Erika Duke, John Walz, Paul Cohen, Paula Hochhalter, Steve Erdody, Timothy Landauer
- Clarinet – Donald Foster, Ralph Williams
- Drums – Vinnie Colaiuta
- Electric bass – Abe Laboriel, Sr.
- Electric upright bass – Michael Valerio
- Flute – Geraldine Rotella, James Walker
- Guitar – Odair Assad, Sérgio Assad, George Doering, Mike Landau
- Harp – Gayle Levant
- Horn – Brian O'Connor, David Duke, James Thatcher, Mark Adams, Phillip Yao, Richard Todd
- Percussion – Alex Acuña, Robert Zimmitti, Luis Conte, Michael Fisher, Peter Limonick, Satnam Ramgotra
- Piano – James Newton Howard, Joseph Rotondi
- Saxophone – Dan Higgins, Joel Peskin
- Trombone – Alex Iles, Andrew Thomas Malloy, Bill Reichenbach, Steve Holtman
- Trumpet – Gary Grant, Wayne Bergeron
- Viola – Andrew Duckles, Brian Dembow, Darrin McCann, David Walther, Denyse Buffum, Jennie Hansen, Keith Greene, Marlow Fisher, Matthew Funes, Mike Nowak, Pam Goldsmith, Robert Berg, Roland Kato, Shawn Mann, Steven Gordon, Thomas Diener, Vicky Miskolczy
- Violin – Aimee Kreston, Ana Landauer, Anatoly Rosinsky, Bruce Dukov, Endre Granat, Eun-Mee Ahn, Haim Shtrum, Henry Gronnier, Irina Voloshina, Jackie Brand, Jeanne Skrocki, Josefina Vergara, Julie Ann Gigante, Katia Popov, Kenneth Yerke, Kevin Connolly, Lisa Sutton, Marc Sazer, Miwako Watanabe, Natalie Leggett, Phillip Levy, Radu Pieptea, Rafael Rishik, Richard Altenbach, Roberto Cani, Roger Wilkie, Sara Parkins, Sarah Thornblade, Serena McKinney, Sungil Lee, Tammy Hatwan, Charlie Bisharat

Management

- Album direction – David Buntz
- Director of film scoring – Tiffany Jones
- Executive in charge of music – Harry Garfield, Kathy Nelson
- Music business affairs – Phil Cohen

== Accolades ==
Award	Category	Recipient(s) and nominee(s)	Result	Ref.
ASCAP Film and Television Music Awards	Top Box Office Films (Note: also for Confessions of a Shopaholic)	James Newton Howard	Won	
International Film Music Critics Association	Best Original Score for a Drama Film	James Newton Howard	Nominated	
