= Dirty Laundry (Bitter:Sweet song) =

Song by Bitter:Sweet

from the album The Mating Game
- Released: April 4, 2006
- Genre: Electronic; trip hop
- Length: 3:20
- Label: Quango
- Songwriter(s): Charles Aznavour, Shana Halligan, Michael Railton, Kiran Shahani

"Dirty Laundry" is a song by Bitter:Sweet, the electronic/trip hop, with jazz-like qualities, duo Shana Halligan and Kiran Shahani from Los Angeles (from their first album The Mating Game 2006, on the Quango label).

== Composition ==
The song features a horn section sample that derives from the song "Parce Que Tu Crois" by Charles Aznavour.

== Use in media ==
The song was chosen for pre-installation on the first model of Microsoft's Zune MP3 player in November 2006 and has been used since in:

- Film : Shoot 'Em Up (2007), the Bugs Bunny inspired big-budget live-action film starring Clive Owen, Paul Giamatti and Monica Bellucci.
- TV: Eight weeks of promotions for Samantha Who?, promotions of Grey's Anatomy across the ABC Network and in promotions for all Showtime Networks shows including Weeds and The L Word in 2007. It was also used in Germany as main-theme of high-rated TV series Doctor's Diary in 2008. Danish show (the) Brian Mørk Show also used it as its intro tune. The song was also used in Season 7, Episode 17 of Smallville and in Episode 13 ("Betrayed") of Season 7 of Law and Order: Criminal Intent.
- Advertisements: Cadbury's Chocolate, most notably the Victoria's Secret 'Pajamas Sale'; television commercial of November 17, 2007, featuring the Brazilian supermodel Adriana Lima, and 2018 Pantene commercials in Asia which featured Pimchanok Luevisadpaibul and Anne Curtis.
