= In the Mood for Life =

Studio album by Wax Tailor
- Released: 22 September 2009
- Genre: Hip hop
- Label: Le Plan, Blen Corp
- Producer: Wax Tailor

Wax Tailor chronology
Hope & Sorrow (2007)	In the Mood for Life (2009)	Dusty Rainbow from the Dark (2012)

In the Mood for Life is a full-length album by French hip hop producer Wax Tailor. It was released on 22 September 2009 and licensed for release in North America by Le Plan and in Australia by Blend Corp.

== Track listing ==
#	Title
1	"City Vapors"
2	"Dragon Chasers (feat. Charlotte Savary)"
3	"Already Begun (skit)"
4	"B-Boy on Wax (feat. Speech Defect)"
5	"Street Scent (skit)"
6	"No Pity"
7	"Dry Your Eyes (feat. Sara Genn)"
8	"Masquerade Theme (skit)"
9	"Until Heaven Stops The Rain (feat. Mattic)"
10	"More Songs (skit)"
11	"Leave It (feat. Dionne)"
12	"Escape Theme (skit)"
13	"Go Without Me (feat. Charlotte Savary)"
14	"This Train (feat. Voice & Ali Harter)"
15	"Sit & Listen"
16	"Fireflies (feat. Charlotte Savary & Mattic)"
17	"Say Yes (feat. ASM)"
18	"I Own You (feat. Charlie Winston)"
19	"Greenfields (feat. Charlotte Savary)"

== Charts ==
=== Weekly charts ===
Chart (2009)	Peak position
French Albums (SNEP)	9

=== Year-end charts ===
Chart (2009)	Position
French Albums (SNEP)	139
