= The Mating Game (album) =

Studio album by Bitter:Sweet
- Released: April 4, 2006
- Genre: Trip hop
- Length: 37:14
- Label: Quango
- Producer: Kiran Shahani, Shana Halligan

Bitter:Sweet chronology
The Mating Game (2006)	The Remix Game (2007)

The Mating Game is the 2006 debut album by trip-hop duo Bitter:Sweet.

== Track listing ==
All songs by Shana Halligan and Kiran Shahani.

1. "Don't Forget to Breathe" - 3:14
2. "The Mating Game" - 3:24
3. "Overdue" - 3:34
4. "Heaven" - 3:48
5. "Bittersweet Faith" - 4:19
6. "Moving Forward" - 3:36
7. "Moody" - 2:39
8. "Dirty Laundry" - 3:20
9. "Our Remains" - 3:34
10. "Salty Air" - 3:02
11. "Take 2 Blue" - 2:40

Professional ratings
Review scores
Source	Rating
Allmusic	3.5/5 stars

== Reception ==
The album was met with generally positive reviews. About.com gave it a 4 out of 5 star stating that, "vocalist Shana Halligan and producer/composer Kiran Shahani, the Los Angeles duo known as Bitter:Sweet, have produced a perfectly pleasant bossa nova/electro-pop record," but criticizing the album's similarity with Morcheeba, Portishead, Zero 7, and Goldfrapp. Blogcritics also gave it a good review and asked "what else would you name something that makes beautiful music tinged with a slow seductive shade of melancholy?" Allmusic's editorial review gave the album 3.5 stars, stating "it all adds up to an album that captivates not by virtue of real originality, but by combining familiar elements in consistently enjoyable ways."

== In Media ==
The songs "Bittersweet Faith" and "Our Remains" were featured in the film The Devil Wears Prada. The song "Dirty Laundry" has been featured in commercials for Victoria's Secret and Heineken.

== Charts ==
Album

Year	Chart	Position
2006	Top Electronic Albums	18
