= Neurosis (disambiguation) =

The term neurosis refers to mental disorders that involve neither hallucinations or delusions.

Neurosis may also refer to:

- Neurosis (band)
- "Neurosis", a song by Bitter:Sweet from the album Drama
