= Dusty Rainbow from the Dark =

Studio album by Wax Tailor
- Released: September 18, 2012
- Genre: Hip hop, Electronic, Downtempo
- Label: Lab'Oratoire, Le Plan
- Producer: Wax Tailor

Wax Tailor chronology
In The Mood For Life (2010)	Dusty Rainbow from the Dark (2012)

Singles from Dusty Rainbow From The Dark
- 1. "Heart Stop (feat. Jennifer Charles)" Released: 24 July 2012

Professional ratings
Review scores
Source	Rating
PopMatters	link
Okayplayer	link

Dusty Rainbow from the Dark is the fourth studio album by French hip hop producer Wax Tailor. It was released in 2012 on Le Plan in North America and Lab'Oratoire for the rest of the world. It debuted on the French Albums Chart at #8 and was nominated at the Victoires de la Musique 2013 for Best Electronic Music Album.

A concept album telling the story of a young boy's discovery of the evocative power of music, the album includes narrative interludes by Don McCorkindale, who participated in the radio version of The Avengers series. Editing out the storyline is made possible by the inclusion on the album of 2 radio edits for the songs "Heart Stop" and "Time to Go". The album's cover, representing the story's main protagonist, was drawn by French illustrator Rébecca Dautremer. Vocal guests on the album are Charlotte Savary, Ali Harter, Jennifer Charles, Sara Genn, Shana Halligan, Aloe Blacc, Elzhi, Mattic and A.S.M.

During the recording of the album, Wax Tailor worked with a team of video directors to create videos for each track that are projected as background visuals during Wax Tailor's live shows.

== Track listing ==
#	Title	Length
1	"Exordium"	2:30
2	"Dusty Rainbow (feat. Charlotte Savary)"	3:17
3	"Like An Hourglass"	0:50
4	"Only Once (feat. Ali Harter)"	2:44
5	"Heart Stop (feat. Jennifer Charles)"	2:55
6	"Something Began To Glow"	0:22
7	"No"	2:51
8	"A Stop Motion Bloom"	0:18
9	"The Sound (feat. Mattic)"	3:10
10	"In The Mirror"	0:21
11	"Past, Present & Future (Rock 'n' Roll)"	2:43
12	"Not Alone"	0:23
13	"Down In Flames (feat. Sara Genn)"	4:02
14	"Time To Go (feat. Aloe Blacc)"	3:29
15	"Magic Numbers (feat. A.S.M. & Mattic)"	3:10
16	"No Regret (feat. Shana Halligan)"	3:22
17	"Phonovisions"	3:22
18	"Into The Sky"	0:18
19	"My Window (feat. Elzhi & Mattic)"	3:43
20	"From The Dark"	3:24

== Credits ==
- Produced, directed, arranged and composed by Wax Tailor
- Story written by Wax Tailor and Sara Genn, narrated by Don McCorkindale
