= Drama (Bitter:Sweet album) =

Studio album by Bitter:Sweet
- Released: June 3, 2008
- Genre: Trip hop
- Length: 43:23
- Label: Quango
- Producer: Kiran Shahani, Shana Halligan

Bitter:Sweet chronology
The Remix Game (2007)	Drama (2008)

Professional ratings
Review scores
Source	Rating
Allmusic	link
MusicOMH	link
NME	link
PopMatters	link
The Celebrity Cafe	link
The Independent	(negative) link
Tiny Mix Tapes	link

Drama is a 2008 album by American trip hop duo Bitter:Sweet.

== Critical reception ==
The album garnered polarized reviews from music critics, some of whom praised the album's production.

== Usage in popular culture ==
The song "Trouble" appeared in several trailers for the 2011 film Cars 2.

== Track listing ==
All songs by Shana Halligan and Kiran Shahani.

1. "Intro Dramatico" - 0:10
2. "Get What I Want" - 3:25
3. "Come Along With Me" - 2:18
4. "The Bomb" - 3:02
5. "Drama" - 4:02
6. "Waking Up" - 3:33
7. "A Moment" - 4:18
8. "Sugar Mama" - 2:56
9. "Trouble" - 3:21
10. "Love Revolution" - 3:12
11. "Neurosis" - 3:12
12. "Drink You Sober" - 4:29
13. "Everything" - 5:29
