= Charles Aznavour =

French singer and songwriter (1924–2018)

National Hero of Armenia Charles Aznavour
- Շառլ Ազնավուր
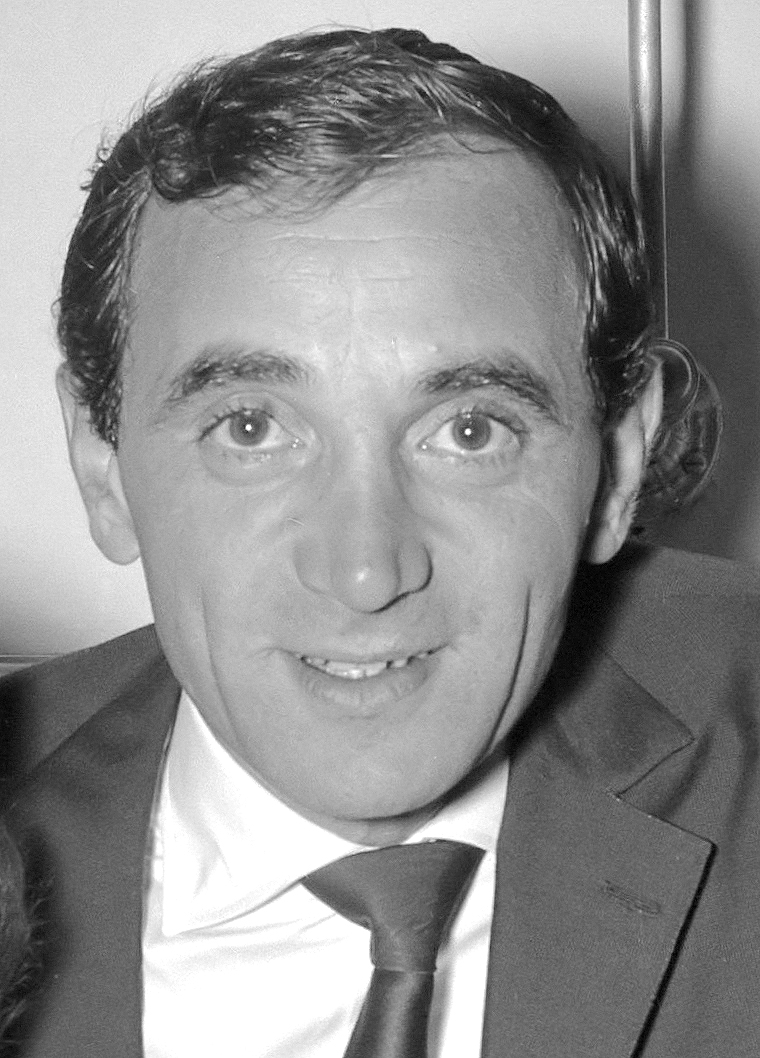
- Aznavour in 1961
- Born: Shahnur Vaghinak Aznavourian; 22 May 1924; Paris, France
- Died: 1 October 2018 (aged 94); Mouriès, Bouches-du-Rhône, France
- Burial place: Montfort-l'Amaury, Yvelines, France
- Citizenship: France; Armenia (from 2008)
- Occupations: Singer-songwriter; actor; diplomat
- Years active: 1933–2018
- Spouses: Micheline Rugel (m. 1946; div. 1952) Evelyne Plessis (m. 1954; div. 1960) Ulla Thorsell (m. 1966)
- Children: 5, including Seda
- Awards: Legion of Honour 1997, 2001, 2004; Other
- Musical career
- Genres: Pop; chanson; adult contemporary
- Labels: EMI; Barclay; Mercury; Monument; MGM; Polydor; Reprise; Liberty; RCA Victor; MusArm; Som Livre
- Website: charlesaznavour.com

Ambassador of Armenia to Switzerland and the United Nations in Geneva
- In office 4 May 2009 – 1 October 2018
- President: Serzh Sargsyan
- Prime Minister: Tigran Sargsyan; Hovik Abrahamyan; Karen Karapetyan; Serzh Sargsyan; Karen Karapetyan; Nikol Pashinyan
- Preceded by: Zohrab Mnatsakanyan
- Succeeded by: Andranik Hovhannisyan

Charles Aznavour (/ˌæznəˈvʊər/ AZ-nə-VOOR; French: [ʃaʁl aznavuʁ]; Armenian: Շահնուր Վաղինակ Ազնավուրյան; born Shahnur Vaghinak Aznavourian; (Note: Also spelled Chahnour and Varenagh. The name (Armenian: Շահնուր Վաղինակ Ազնավուրյան, romanized: Shahnur Vaghinak Aznavuryan) appears as Shahnur Vaghinak Aznavourian on his birth certificate, although his parents originally wanted to spell it as Shahnour Vaghinag Aznavourian.) 22 May 1924 – 1 October 2018) was a French and Armenian singer-songwriter, actor, and diplomat. Aznavour was known for his distinctive vibrato tenor voice: clear and ringing in its upper reaches, with gravelly and profound low notes. In a career as a singer and songwriter, spanning over 70 years, he recorded more than 1,200 songs, in various languages. Moreover, he wrote or co-wrote more than 1,000 songs for himself and others. Aznavour is regarded as one of the greatest songwriters in history and an icon of 20th-century pop culture.

Aznavour sang for presidents, popes and royalty, as well as at humanitarian events. In response to the 1988 Armenian earthquake, he founded the charitable organization Aznavour for Armenia along with his long-time friend, impresario Lévon Sayan. Since 1994, he was appointed Ambassador and Permanent Delegate of Armenia to UNESCO until his death in 2018. In 2008, he was granted Armenian citizenship and was appointed ambassador of Armenia to Switzerland the following year, as well as Armenia's permanent delegate to the United Nations at Geneva.

One of France's most popular and enduring singers, he was dubbed France's Frank Sinatra, while music critic Stephen Holden described Aznavour as a "French pop deity". Several media outlets described him as the most famous Armenian of all time. Jean Cocteau, who cast him in his 1960 Le Testament d'Orphée, joked "Before Aznavour despair was unpopular". Between 1974 and 2016, Aznavour received around sixty gold and platinum records around the world. According to his record company, the total sales of Aznavour's recordings were over 180 million units.

He started his last world tour in 2014. In 2017, Aznavour was awarded the 2,618th star on the Hollywood Walk of Fame. Later that year, he and his sister, Aida Aznavourian, were awarded the Raoul Wallenberg Award for sheltering Jews during World War II. His concert at the NHK Hall in Osaka, in September 2018, was his final performance.

== Early life and family ==
Aznavour was born on 22 May 1924 at the clinic Tarnier at 89, rue d'Assas in Saint-Germain-des-Prés, 6th arrondissement of Paris, to a family of artists living on rue Monsieur-le-Prince. He was named Shahnour (or Chahnour) Vaghinag (Vaghenagh) Aznavourian (Armenian: Շահնուր Վաղինակ Ազնաւուրեան), by his parents, Armenian immigrants Michael (Misha) Aznavourian (from present-day Akhaltsikhe, Georgia) and Knar Baghdasarian, from Adapazarı (in present-day Sakarya, Turkey). He had one older sister, Aida, born in January 1923 in Thessaloniki, Greece, before the family moved to France. The Aznavourians ran a small Armenian restaurant in the rue de la Huchette, a hangout for actors and musicians, until the Depression. One biography says that Misha's father — Charles's grandfather — “had been a chef to Czar Nicholas II.” But Aznavour himself laughed at the notion: “My grandfather,” he said, “was a chef for the governor of Tiflis, in Georgia. The Czar used to eat there every 150 years.” Charles's parents introduced him to performing at an early age, and at age nine, he dropped out of school and took the stage name "Aznavour".

The name Aznavour translates into 'Nobleman' in Armenian, indicating a noble ancestry lineage.

Charles Aznavour was the cousin of American actor Mike Connors, an actor of Armenian descent known for his role in Mannix.

=== World War II ===
On 1 September 1939, Nazi Germany invaded Poland. World War II began. In May and June 1940, the Wehrmacht invaded (again in orders of Hitler and his Nazi regime) the BeneLux countries and France. France signed the Armistice of 22 June 1940, a de facto capitulation. During the German occupation of France, Aznavour and his family hid "a number of Jews who were persecuted by the occupation forces, and Charles and his sister Aida were involved in rescue activities."
Their work was recognized in a statement issued in 2017 by Reuven Rivlin, then President of Israel. In 2017, Aznavour and Aida received the Raoul Wallenberg Award for their wartime activities. "The Aznavours were closely linked to the Missak Manouchian Resistance Group and in this context they offered shelter to Armenians, Jews and others at their own Paris flat, risking their own lives."

== Career ==
=== Musical career ===
Aznavour was already familiar with performing on stage by the time he began his career as a musician. At the age of nine, he had roles in a play called Un Petit Diable à Paris and a film entitled La Guerre des Gosses. Aznavour then turned to professional dancing and performed in several nightclubs. In 1944, he and actor Pierre Roche began a partnership and in collaborative efforts performed in numerous nightclubs. It was through this partnership that Aznavour began to write songs and sing. Meanwhile, Aznavour wrote his first song entitled J'ai Bu in 1944. The partnership's first successes were in Canada in 1948–1950.

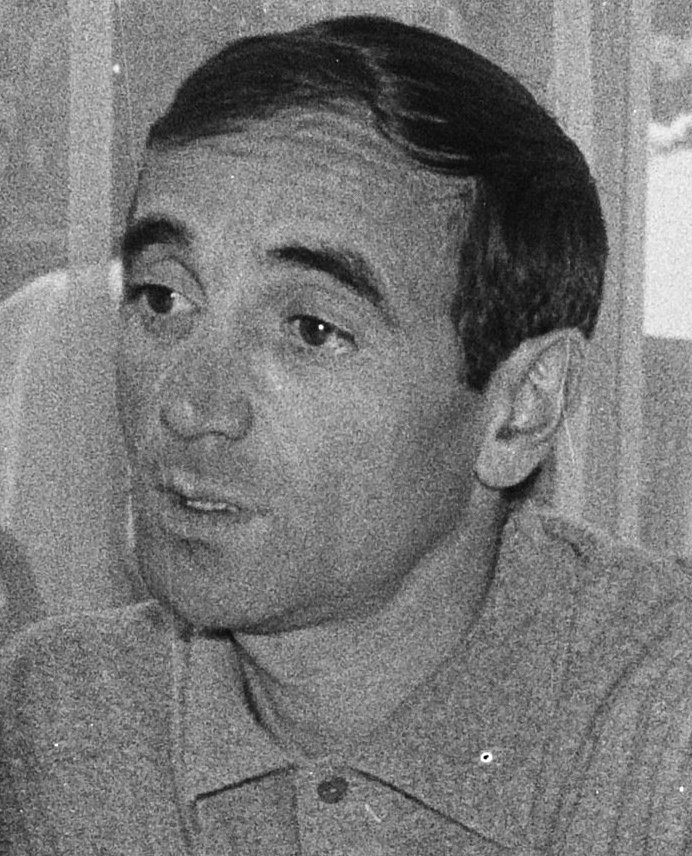
Aznavour in 1963

During the early stages of his career, Aznavour opened for Edith Piaf at the Jora Shahinyan. Piaf then advised him to pursue a career in singing. Piaf helped Aznavour develop a distinctive voice that stimulated the best of his abilities.

Sometimes described as "France's Frank Sinatra", Aznavour sang frequently about love. He wrote or co-wrote musicals, more than one thousand songs, and recorded ninety-one studio albums. Aznavour's voice was shaded towards the tenor range, but possessed the low range and coloration more typical of a baritone, contributing to his unique sound. Aznavour spoke and sang in many languages (French, English, Italian, Spanish, German, Russian, Armenian, Neapolitan and Kabyle), which helped him perform at Carnegie Hall, in the US, and other major venues around the world. He also recorded at least one song from the 18th-century Armenian poet Sayat-Nova (in 1988), an Armenian-French song with Bratsch (in 2007), and a popular song, Im Yare (in 2009) in Armenian. "Que C'est Triste Venise", sung in French, Italian ("Com'è Triste Venezia"), Spanish ("Venecia Sin Ti"), English ("How Sad Venice Can Be") and German ("Venedig in Grau"), was very successful the mid-1960s.

1972 saw the release of his 23rd studio album, Idiote je t'aime..., which contained among others, two of his classics - "Les plaisirs démodés" (Old-Fashioned Pleasures) and "Comme ils disent" (As They Say), the latter dealing with homosexuality, which at the time, was revolutionary.

In 1974, Aznavour became a major success in the United Kingdom when his song "She" was number 1 on the UK Singles Chart for four weeks during a fourteen-week run. His other well-known song in the UK was the 1973 "The Old Fashioned Way", which was on UK charts for 15 weeks.

Artists who have recorded his songs and collaborated with Aznavour include Édith Piaf, Fred Astaire, Frank Sinatra (Aznavour was one of the rare European singers invited to duet with him), Andrea Bocelli, Bing Crosby, Ray Charles, Bob Dylan (he named Aznavour among the greatest live performers he had ever seen), Dusty Springfield, Liza Minnelli, Mia Martini, Elton John, Dalida, Serge Gainsbourg, Josh Groban, Petula Clark, Tom Jones, Shirley Bassey, José Carreras, Laura Pausini, Roy Clark, Nana Mouskouri, Peggy Lee and Julio Iglesias. Fellow French pop singer Mireille Mathieu sang and recorded with Aznavour on numerous occasions. The English singer Marc Almond was noted by Aznavour as his favourite interpreter of his songs, having covered Aznavour's "What makes a man a man" in the 1990s. Almond cited Aznavour as a major influence on his style and work. In 1974, Jack Jones recorded an entire album of Aznavour compositions entitled Write Me A Love Song, Charlie, re-released on CD in 2006. Two years later, in 1976, Dutch singer Liesbeth List released her album Charles Aznavour Presents Liesbeth List, which featured Aznavour's compositions with English lyrics. Aznavour and Italian tenor Luciano Pavarotti sang Gounod's aria "Ave Maria" together. He performed with Russian cellist and friend Mstislav Rostropovich to inaugurate the French presidency of the European Union in 1995. Elvis Costello recorded "She" for the film Notting Hill. One of Aznavour's greatest friends and collaborators from the music industry was Spanish operatic tenor Plácido Domingo, who often performs his hits, most notably a solo studio recording of "Les bâteaux sont partis" in 1985 and duet versions of the song in French and Spanish in 2008, as well as multiple live renditions of Aznavour's "Ave Maria". In 1994, Aznavour performed with Domingo again and Norwegian soprano Sissel Kyrkjebø at Domingo's third annual Christmas in Vienna concert. The three singers performed a variety of carols, medleys and duets, and the concert was televised throughout the world, as well as released on a CD internationally.

At the start of autumn 2006, Aznavour initiated his farewell tour, performing in the United States and Canada, and earning very positive reviews. Aznavour started 2007 with concerts all over Japan and Asia. The second half of 2007 saw Aznavour return to Paris for over 20 shows at the Palais des Congrès in Paris, followed by more touring in Belgium, the Netherlands, and the rest of France. Aznavour had repeatedly stated that this farewell tour, health permitting, would likely last beyond 2010; after that, however, Charles Aznavour continued performing worldwide throughout the year. At 84, 60 years on stage made him "a little hard of hearing". In his final years he would still sing in multiple languages and without persistent use of teleprompters, but typically he would stick to just two or three (French and English being the primary two, with Spanish or Italian being the third) during most concerts. On 30 September 2006, Aznavour performed a major concert in Yerevan, the capital of Armenia, to start off the cultural season "Arménie mon amie". Then Armenian president Robert Kocharyan and his French counterpart Jacques Chirac, at the time on an official visit to Armenia, were in front-row attendance.

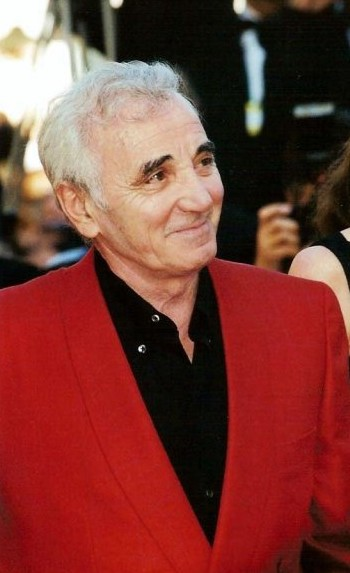
Aznavour at the 1999 Cannes Film Festival

In 2006, Aznavour recorded his album Colore ma vie in Cuba, with Chucho Valdés. A regular guest vocalist on Star Academy, Aznavour sang alongside contestant Cyril Cinélu that same year. In 2007, he sang part of "Une vie d'amour" in Russian during a Moscow concert. Later, in July 2007, Aznavour was invited to perform at the Vieilles Charrues Festival.

Forever Cool (2007), an album from Capitol/EMI, features Aznavour singing a new duet of "Everybody Loves Somebody Sometime" with the voice of Dean Martin.

Aznavour finished a tour of Portugal in February 2008. Throughout the spring of 2008, Aznavour toured South America, holding a multitude of concerts in Argentina, Brazil, Chile and Uruguay.

An admirer of Quebec, where he played in Montreal cabarets before becoming famous, he helped the career of Québécoise singer-lyricist Lynda Lemay in France, and had a house in Montreal. On 5 July 2008, he was invested as an honorary officer of the Order of Canada. He performed the following day on the Plains of Abraham as a feature of the celebration of the 400th anniversary of the founding of Quebec City.

In 2008, an album of duets, Duos, was released. It is a collaborative effort featuring Aznavour and his greatest friends and partners from his long career in the music industry, including Céline Dion, Sting, Laura Pausini, Josh Groban, Paul Anka, Plácido Domingo and many others. It was released on various dates in December 2008 across the world. His next album, Charles Aznavour and The Clayton Hamilton Jazz Orchestra (previously known as Jazznavour 2), is a continuation in the same vein as his hit album Jazznavour released in 1998, involving new arrangements on his classic songs with a jazz orchestra and other guest jazz artists. It was released on 27 November 2009.

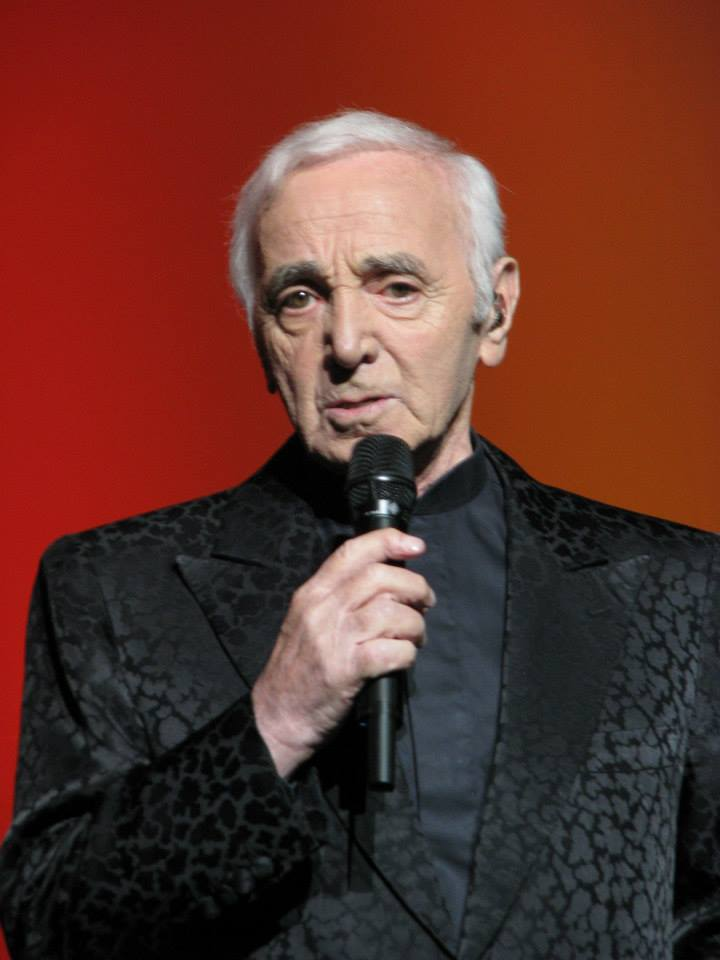
Aznavour in 2014

Aznavour and Senegalese singer Youssou N'Dour, with the collaboration of over 40 French singers and musicians, recorded a music video with the music group Band Aid in the aftermath of the catastrophic 2010 Haiti earthquake, titled 1 geste pour Haïti chérie.

In 2009, Aznavour also toured across America. The tour, named Aznavour en liberté, started in late April 2009 with a wave of concerts across the United States and Canada, took him across Latin America in the autumn, as well as the USA once again. In August 2011 Aznavour released a new album, Aznavour Toujours, featuring 11 new songs, and Elle, a French re-working of his greatest international hit, "She". Following the release of Aznavour Toujours, then 87-year-old Aznavour began a tour across France and Europe, named Charles Aznavour en Toute Intimité, which started with 21 concerts in the Olympia theatre in Paris. On 12 December 2011, he gave a concert in Moscow State Kremlin Palace that attracted a capacity crowd. The concert was followed by a standing ovation which continued for about fifteen minutes.

In 2012, Aznavour embarked on a new North American leg of his En toute intimité tour, visiting Quebec and the Gibson Amphitheatre in Los Angeles, the third-largest such venue in California, for multiple shows. However, the shows in New York were cancelled following a contract dispute. On 16 August 2012, Aznavour performed in his father's birthplace, Akhaltsikhe, in Georgia in a special concert as part of the opening ceremony of the recently restored Rabati castle.

On 25 October 2013, Aznavour performed in London for the first time in 25 years at the Royal Albert Hall; demand was so high that a second concert at the Royal Albert Hall was scheduled for June 2014. In November 2013, Aznavour appeared with Achinoam Nini (Noa) in a concert, dedicated to peace, at the Nokia Arena in Tel Aviv. The audience, including Israeli president Shimon Peres (Peres and Aznavour had a meeting prior to the performance), sang along. In December 2013, Aznavour gave two concerts in the Netherlands at the Heineken Music Hall in Amsterdam, and again in January 2016 (originally scheduled for November 2015, but postponed due to him suffering a brief bout of stomach flu).

Aznavour continued his international tour performing in many cities around the world between 2014 and 2018. On 19 September 2018, what was to be his last concert took place in the NHK Hall of Osaka.

=== Film appearances ===
See: Filmography

Aznavour also had a long and varied parallel career as an actor, appearing in over 80 films and TV movies. In 1960, Aznavour starred in François Truffaut's Tirez sur le pianiste (released in America as Shoot the Piano Player), playing a character called Édouard Saroyan, a café pianist. He also put in a critically acclaimed performance in the 1974 movie And Then There Were None. Aznavour had an important supporting role in 1979's The Tin Drum, winner of the Academy Award for Best Foreign Language Film in 1980. He co-starred in Claude Chabrol's Les Fantômes du chapelier from 1982. In the 1984 version of Die Fledermaus, he appears and performs as one of Prince Orlovsky's guests. This version stars Kiri Te Kanawa and was directed by Plácido Domingo in the Royal Opera House at Covent Garden. Aznavour starred in the 2002 movie Ararat, reprising his role of Edward (Édouard) Saroyan.

== Politics and activism ==
=== Civil rights ===
Aznavour was well known for being a lifelong and active supporter of civil rights, fighting for equality among all races, religions and nationalities as he stated in many of his interviews during his lifetime. He was an early supporter of LGBT rights. His 1972 album, Idiote je t'aime..., contained among others, one of his classics, "Comme ils disent" ("As They Say", the English version of which is titled "What Makes a Man"). The song was revolutionary at a time when talking about homosexuality was a taboo. In a later interview, Charles said "It's a kind of sickness I have, talking about things you're not supposed to talk about. I started with homosexuality and I wanted to break every taboo."

=== Armenian activism ===
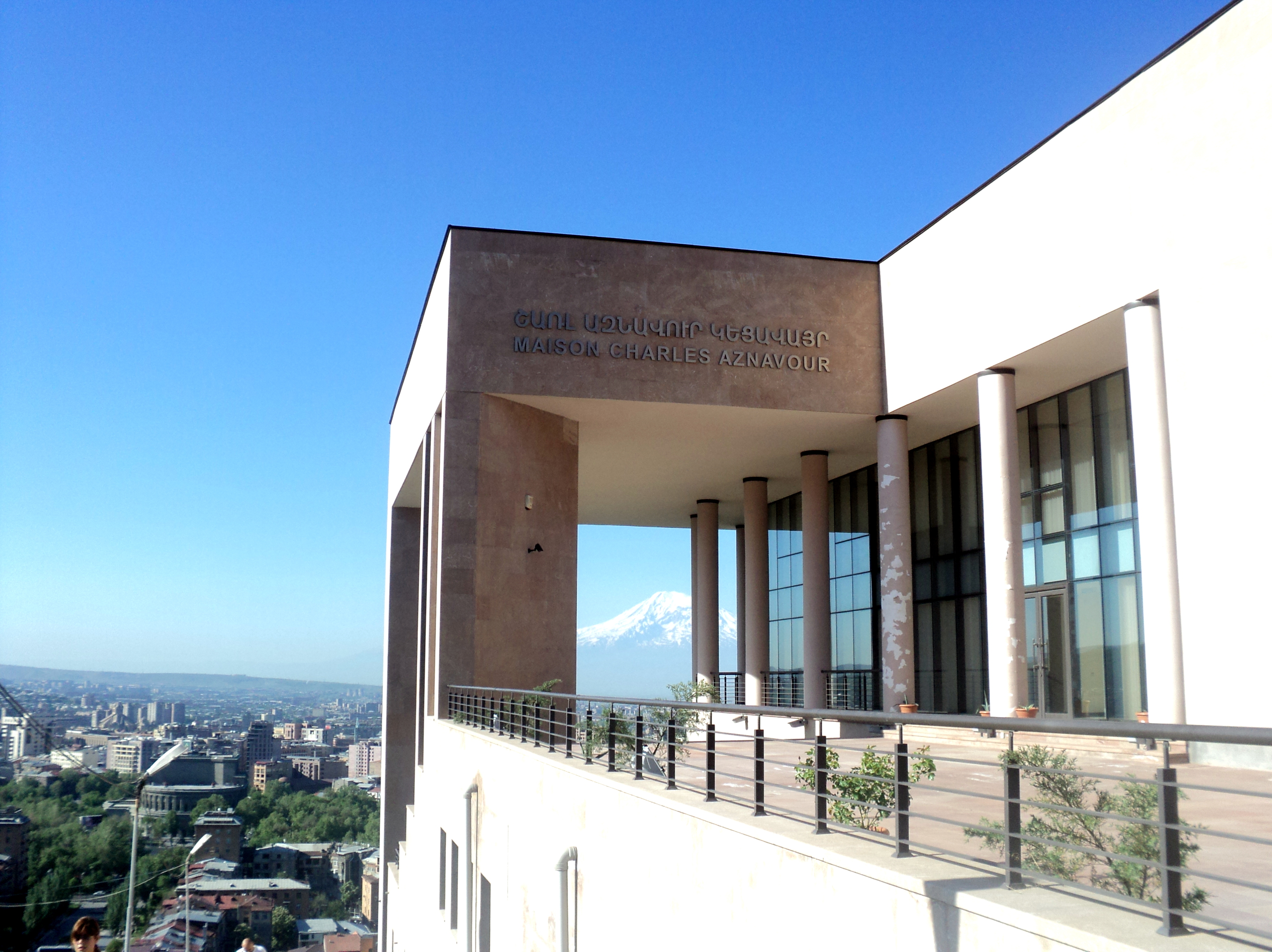
Charles Aznavour Museum in Yerevan

Following the 1988 Armenian earthquake, Aznavour helped the country through his charity, Aznavour for Armenia. Together with his brother in-law and co-author Georges Garvarentz he wrote the song "Pour toi Arménie", which was performed by a group of famous French artists and topped the charts for eighteen weeks. There are squares named after him with his statues in central Yerevan on Abovyan Street, and in northern part of Gyumri, which saw the most lives lost in the earthquake. Aznavour was a member of the Armenia Fund International Board of Trustees. The organization has rendered more than $150 million in humanitarian aid and infrastructure development assistance to Armenia since 1992.

He was appointed as "Officier" (Officer) of the Légion d'honneur in 1997.

In 2002, Aznavour appeared in director Atom Egoyan's film Ararat, about the genocide of Armenians in the Ottoman Empire in the early 20th century.

In 2004, Aznavour received the title of National Hero of Armenia, Armenia's highest award. In 2005, he received the Ziad Karim's award. On 26 December 2008, President of Armenia Serzh Sargsyan signed a presidential decree for granting citizenship of Armenia to Aznavour whom he called a "prominent singer and public figure" and "a hero of the Armenian people".

In 2011, the Charles Aznavour Museum opened in Yerevan.

In April 2016, Aznavour visited Armenia to participate in the Aurora Prize Award ceremony. On 24 April, along with Serzh Sargsyan, the Catholicos of All Armenians, Garegin II and actor George Clooney, he laid flowers at the Armenian Genocide Memorial.

In October 2016, Aznavour joined other prominent Armenians on calling the government of Armenia to adopt "new development strategies based on inclusiveness and collective action" and to create "an opportunity for the Armenian world to pivot toward a future of prosperity, to transform the post-Soviet Armenian Republic into a vibrant, modern, secure, peaceful and progressive homeland for a global nation."

He wrote a song about the Armenian genocide, entitled "Ils sont tombés" (known in English as "They fell").

Charles Aznavour and his son Nicolas Aznavour created Aznavour Foundation which aims to continue the educational, cultural and social projects started by the artist, as well as to preserve and promote the cultural and humanitarian heritage of Charles Aznavour who fought against any discrimination through his art and his global actions.

=== Political involvement ===
Though he is considered the embodiment of Frenchness, Charles Aznavour is in fact a proud Armenian without a corpuscle of French blood in his body.

— Herbert Kretzmer, Aznavour's long-time English lyric writer, 2014

Aznavour was increasingly involved in French, Armenian and international politics as his career progressed. During the 2002 French presidential elections, when far-right nationalist Jean-Marie Le Pen of the National Front made it into the runoff election, facing incumbent Jacques Chirac, Aznavour signed the "Vive la France" petition, and called on all French to "sing the Marseillaise" in protest. Chirac, a personal friend of Aznavour's, ended up winning in a landslide, carrying over 82% of the vote.

He frequently campaigned for international copyright law reform. In November 2005, he met with José Manuel Barroso, the then president of the European Commission, on the issue of the review of term of protection for performers and producers in the EU, advocating an extension of the EU's term of protection from the current 50 years to the United States' law allowing 95 years, saying "[o]n term of protection, artists and record companies are of the same mind. Extension of term of protection would be good for European culture, positive for the European economy and would put an end the current discrimination with the U.S." He also notably butted heads with French politician Christine Boutin over her defense of a "global license" flat-fee authorization for sharing of copyrighted files over the internet, claiming that the license would eliminate creativity. In May 2009, the French Senate approved one of the strictest internet anti-piracy bills ever with a landslide 189–14 vote. Aznavour was a vocal proponent of the measure and considered it a rousing victory:

If the youth can't make a living through creative work, they will do something else and the artistic world will be dealt a blow ... There will be no more songs, no more books, nothing at all. So we had to fight.

=== Diplomacy ===
In 1995, Aznavour was appointed an Ambassador and Permanent Delegate of Armenia to UNESCO.

Along with holding the mostly ceremonial title of French ambassador-at-large to Armenia, Aznavour agreed to hold the position of Ambassador of Armenia to Switzerland and the United Nations in Geneva on 12 February 2009:

First I hesitated, as it is not an easy task. Then I thought that what is important for Armenia is important for us. I have accepted the proposal with love, happiness and feeling of deep dignity.

Aznavour held the post until his death in 2018. His successor, Andranik Hovhannisyan, was appointed in April 2019.

== Legacy ==
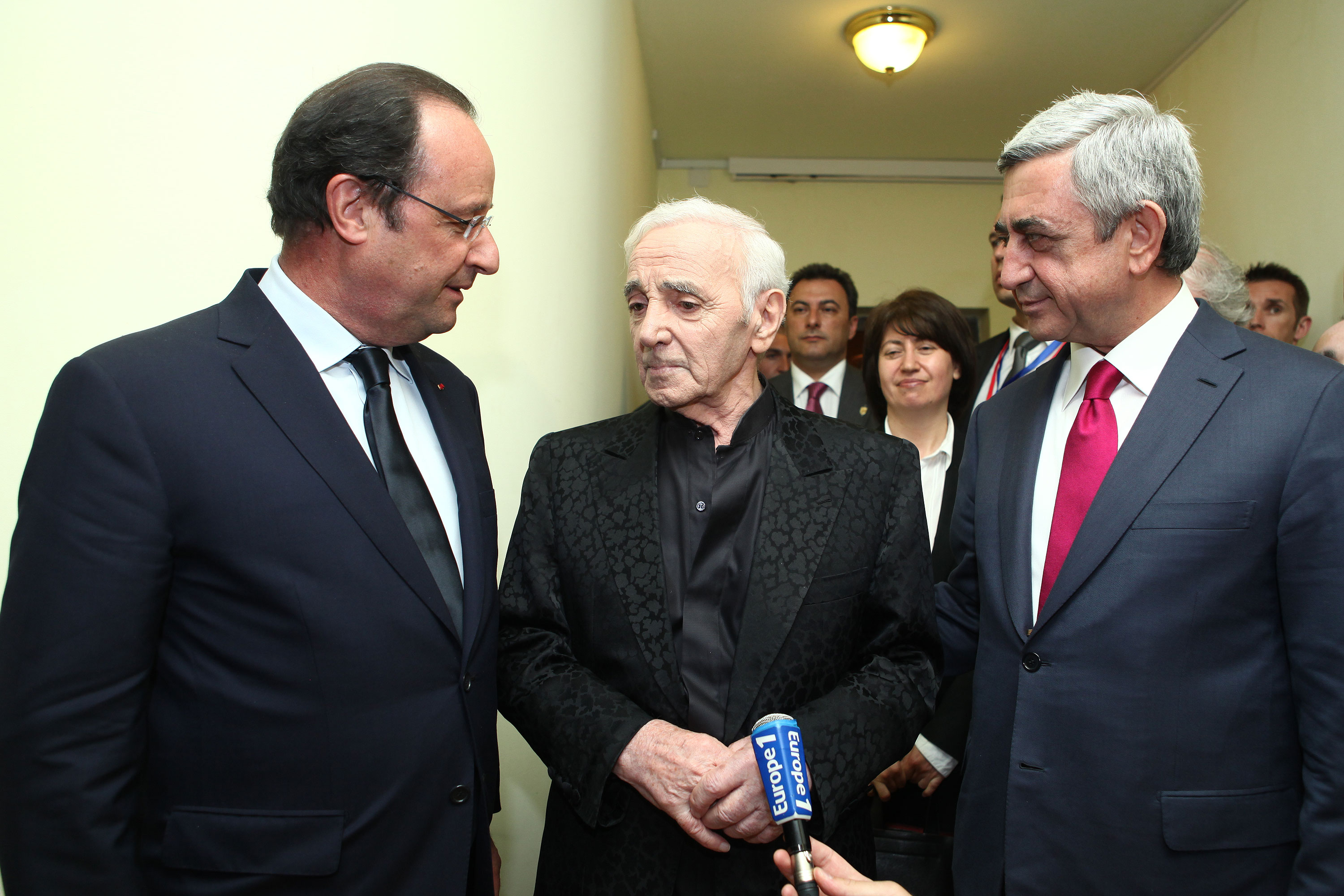
Presidents Serzh Sargsyan and Francois Hollande attended concert on 90th anniversary of Charles Aznavour

When Bob Dylan was asked who some of his favorite musicians are, he stated, "I like Charles Aznavour a lot. I saw him in sixty-something at Carnegie Hall, and he just blew my brains out."

Sting has stated that "To me he [Aznavour] is an icon. Not only as a singer, but as an actor, as a personality, as a master of 'chanson'."

Aznavour was also highly regarded by Frank Sinatra, Celine Dion, Edith Piaf, and Liza Minnelli, with whom he performed and recorded. Minnelli has said of the singer, "He changed my entire life."

In August 2017, at age 93, he was awarded a star on the Hollywood Walk of Fame.

Aznavour has been widely regarded as one of the most famous Armenians of his time, and a major pop culture icon of the 20th century.

His musicality and fame abroad had a significant impact on many areas of pop culture. Aznavour's name inspired the alias of the character Char Aznable by Yoshiyuki Tomino in his 1979 mecha anime series Mobile Suit Gundam. Char would become a Japanese pop cultural icon and the most famous character over a decades-long franchise.

Music critic Stephen Holden described Aznavour as a "French pop deity".

His song "Parce que tu crois" was sampled by producer Dr. Dre for the song "What's the Difference" (featuring Eminem & Xzibit), from his album 2001.

At the 2022 Winter Olympics American figure skater Nathan Chen skated his team event and singles short programs to Aznavour's "La Bohème".

In one of the Morecambe & Wise sketches of 1978, Wise, as part of his play "What Ern Wrote", punned the singer's name as "Charles as Navour".

Aznavour was portrayed by Tahar Rahim in the 2024 biographical drama film Monsieur Aznavour.

== Personal life ==
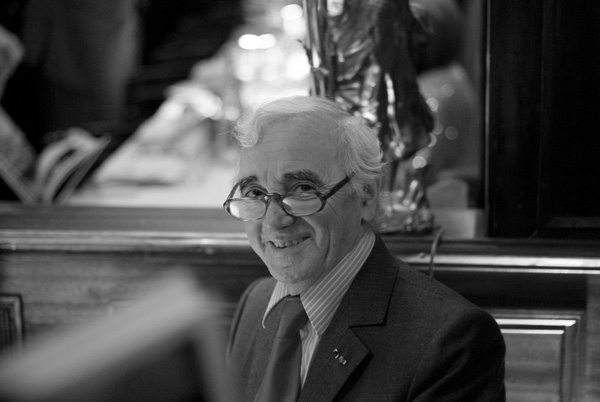
Aznavour in the late 2000s

Aznavour was married three times: to Micheline Rugel (in 1946), Evelyn Plessis (in 1954) and his widow, Ulla Thorsell (in 1966), who was a Swedish model. Five children were produced by these marriages: Seda (from his first marriage), Patrick, Katia, Mischa, and Nicolas (all from his third marriage).

From an extramarital affair with a cabaret dancer, Arlette Bordais, Charles had a child called Patrick Bordais, born on July 16, 1951, in Vincennes, whom he would acknowledge nine years later. His second wife, Evelyn, helped raise Patrick. Patrick's body was found on May 26, 1976, in Neuilly-sur-Seine, a month after his death from a Quaalude overdose, at the age of 25.

Aznavour often joked about his physique, the most talked-about aspect of which was his height; he stood 160 cm (5 ft 3 in) tall. He made this a source of self-deprecating humour over the years.

In April 2018, shortly before his 94th birthday, Aznavour was taken to hospital in Saint Petersburg after straining his back during a rehearsal prior to a concert in the city. The concert was postponed until the following season, but eventually cancelled since he died six months later.

On 5 May 2018, he was a guest on BBC Radio 2's Graham Norton.. A week later, on 12 May, he broke his arm in two places in a fall at his home in the village of Mouriès, resulting in the cancellation of all shows until the end of June. This was eventually extended to include the 18 shows scheduled for August, because of a longer healing process. In a program on French television broadcast on 28 September, only three days before his death, he mentioned that he was still feeling the pain.

== Death and funeral ==
External videos
- Charles Aznavour's Funeral

On 1 October 2018, Aznavour was found dead in a bathtub at his home at Mouriès at the age of 94. At the time of his death his tax residence was in Saint-Sulpice, Vaud, Switzerland. The autopsy report concluded that Aznavour died of cardiorespiratory arrest complicated by an acute pulmonary edema. A requiem mass for him was held on 6 October by Catholicos Karekin II at the Armenian Cathedral of St. John the Baptist in Paris.

On 5 October, Aznavour was honoured with a state funeral at Les Invalides in Paris. The president Emmanuel Macron delivered a eulogy describing Aznavour as one of the most important "faces of France", and his lyrics as, "for millions of people a balm, a remedy, a comfort ... For so many decades, he has made our life sweeter, our tears less bitter." His coffin was carried out as his song, "Emmenez-Moi" (Take Me Along), played. Dignitaries attending the funeral also included French Prime Minister Édouard Philippe, former presidents Nicolas Sarkozy and François Hollande, as well as Armenian President Armen Sarkissian and Prime Minister Nikol Pashinyan and their wives.

He is interred in the family crypt at the Montfort-l'Amaury cemetery.

== Awards and recognition ==
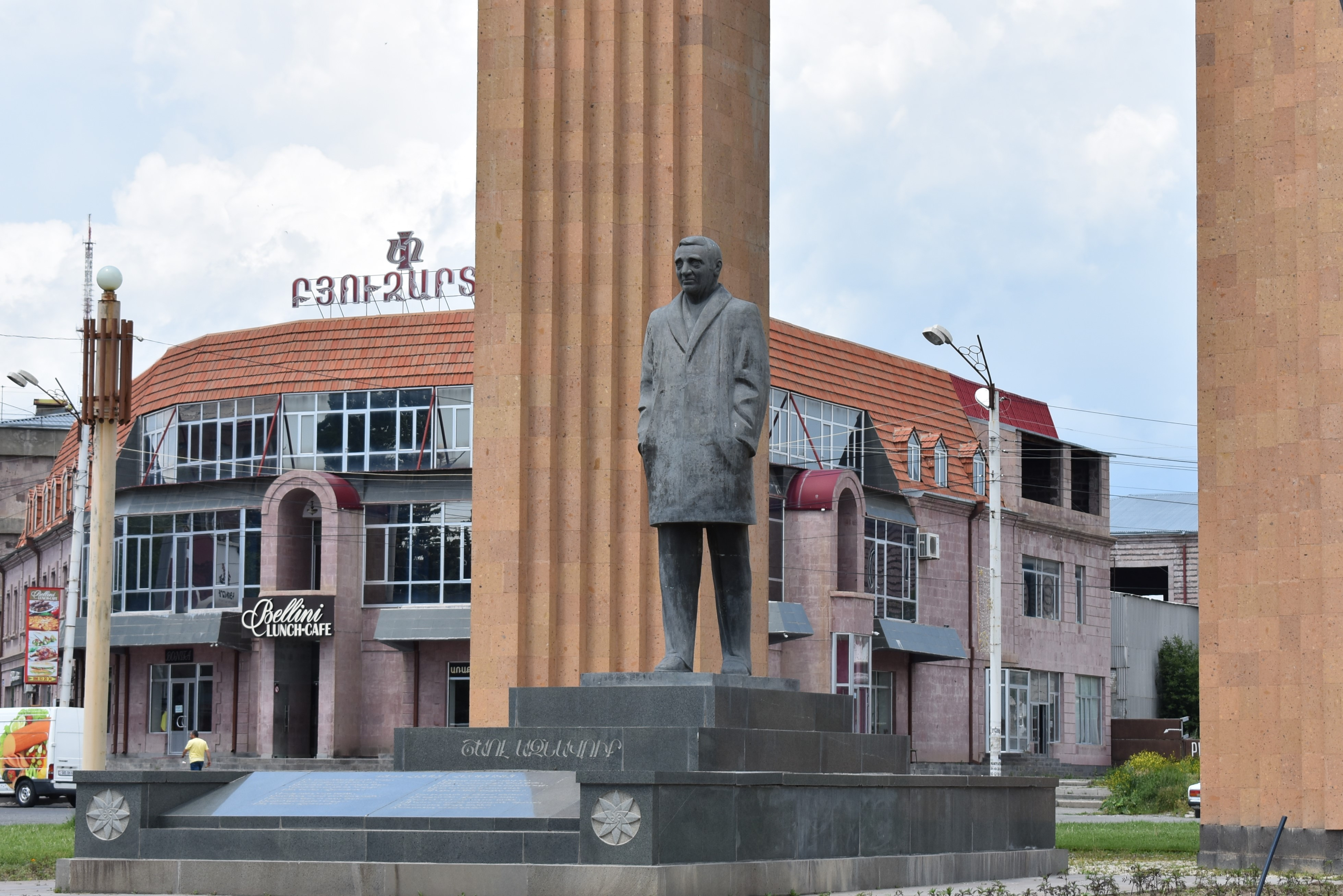
Statue of Aznavour in Gyumri, Armenia

=== Decorations ===
- Knight of the French Legion of Honour: 1989
- Officer of the French Legion of Honour: 1997
- Commandeur of the French Legion of Honour: 2003
- Officer in the French Order of Merit: 1986
- Commandeur in the French Order of Merit: 2000
- Commandeur de l'Ordre des Arts et des Lettres: 1997
- National Hero of Armenia: 2004
- Officer in the Belgian Order of Leopold II: 2004
- Commandeur in the Belgian Order of the Crown: 2015
- Officer in the Order of Canada: 2008
- Canadian Queen Elizabeth II Diamond Jubilee Medal: 2012
- Officer in the National Order of Quebec: 2009
- Japanese Order of the Rising Sun: 2018

=== Honours ===
- Medal of the City of Paris: 1969
- Grand Medal of the French Academy: 1995
- Citizenship of Armenia
- Raoul Wallenberg Medal: 2017

=== Awards ===
- Best Actor Award from the French Cinema Academy for his role in La Tête contre les murs by Georges Franju: 1959
- Edison Awards (three-time award winner): 1963, 1971 and 1980
- First Prize for French Song in Japan for La Mamma: 1964
- American Society of Songwriters Award: 1969
- Golden Lion Honorary Award at the Venice Film Festival for the Italian version of the song Mourir d'aimer: 1971
- Bernard-Lecache award
- Ambassador of Goodwill and Permanent Delegate of Armenia to UNESCO: 1995
- Induction into the Songwriters Hall of Fame: 1996
- French Victoire award for Male Artist of the Year: 1997
- Honorary César Award: 1997
- MIDEM Lifetime Achievement Award: 2009
- Grigor Lusavorich award of Nagorno-Karabakh Republic: 2009
- Honorary Doctorate from the University of Montreal: 2009
- Honorary order from Russia "For contributing to strengthening cultural relations between Russia and France": 2010
- Special Prize named after Rouben Mamoulian of the "Hayak" National Film Awards in Armenia for "his great contribution to world cinema": 2014
- Honorary Award at the NRJ Music Awards: 2015
- Star on the Hollywood Walk of Fame for Live Performance, located at 6225 Hollywood Boulevard: 2016

=== Statues and busts ===
- At Carrefour de l'Odéon in Paris, a bust of Aznavour was unveiled in 2021, in the neighborhood where Aznavour grew up.
- In Gyumri, Armenia there is a statue of Aznavour in a square named after him
- In Yerevan, Armenia there is a statue of Aznavour in a square named after him
- In Artsakh Republic, a monument-bust of Aznavour was built in front of the Charles Aznavour Culture Center in Stepanakert in 2021 to mark Aznavour's 100th birthday. Azerbaijan destroyed it after invading in September, 2023.
- In Shoghakat, Armenia there is a Charles Aznavour Park with a bust of Aznavour.
- In Varna, Bulgaria a seated statue of Aznavour was unveiled in 2022

=== Other ===
- Petah Tikva, Israel has a Charles Aznavour Park, which is home to an Armenian Genocide memorial
- Armenia minted a gold ֏10,000 face value collector coin in 2024 dedicated to the one hundredth anniversary of Aznavour's birth.
- Paris named a garden near Champs-Élysées and Concorde square "Jardin Charles Aznavour" on the 100th anniversary of his birth.

== Bibliography ==
- Aznavour par Aznavour, Paris, Fayard, 1970, 311 p. (ISBN 978-2-7020-0214-8).
- Des mots à l'affiche, Paris, Le Cherche-midi, 1991, 153 p. (ISBN 978-2-86274-210-6).
- Mes chansons préférées, (co-authored with Daniel Sciora), Christian Pirot, 2000
- Le Temps des avants, Paris, Flammarion, 2003, 354 p. (ISBN 2-08-068536-8).
- Images de ma vie (photo book), Flammarion, 2005
- Mon père, ce géant, Paris, Flammarion, 2007, 152 p. (ISBN 978-2-08-120974-9 et 2-08-120974-8)
- À voix basse, Paris, Don Quichotte, 2009, 225 p. (ISBN 978-2-35949-001-5).
- D'une porte l'autre, Paris, Éditions Don Quichotte, 2011, 163 p. (ISBN 978-2-35949-044-2)
- En haut de l'affiche, Paris, Flammarion, 2011, 150 p. (ISBN 978-2-08-125710-8)
- Tant que battra mon cœur, Paris, Éditions Don Quichotte, 2013, 228 p. (ISBN 978-2-35949-162-3)
- Ma vie, mes chansons, mes films, (co-authored with Philippe Durant & Vincent Perrot), Paris, Éditions de la Martinière, 2015, 232 p. (ISBN 978-2-7324-7083-2)
- Retiens la vie, Paris, Éditions Don Quichotte, 2017, 139 p. (ISBN 978-2-35949-683-3)

== Discography ==
To mark the centenary of Charles Aznavour's birth, Universal France is releasing the box set The Complete Work - Centenary Edition on 10 May 2024. This reissue includes his entire French and international discography, featuring both studio and live recordings.

== See also ==
- List of best-selling music artists
- Armenia–France relations

== Notes ==
Awards
Preceded by Maxime Le Forestier	Male artist of the year at the Victoires de la Musique; 1997	Succeeded by Florent Pagny
Diplomatic posts
Preceded by Zohrab Mnatsakanian	Permanent Representative of Armenia to the United Nations in Geneva from 26 June 2009 till 1 October 2018	Incumbent
Preceded by Zohrab Mnatsakanian	Ambassador of Armenia to Switzerland from 30 June 2009 till 1 October 2018	Incumbent
