= Seda Aznavour =

French singer

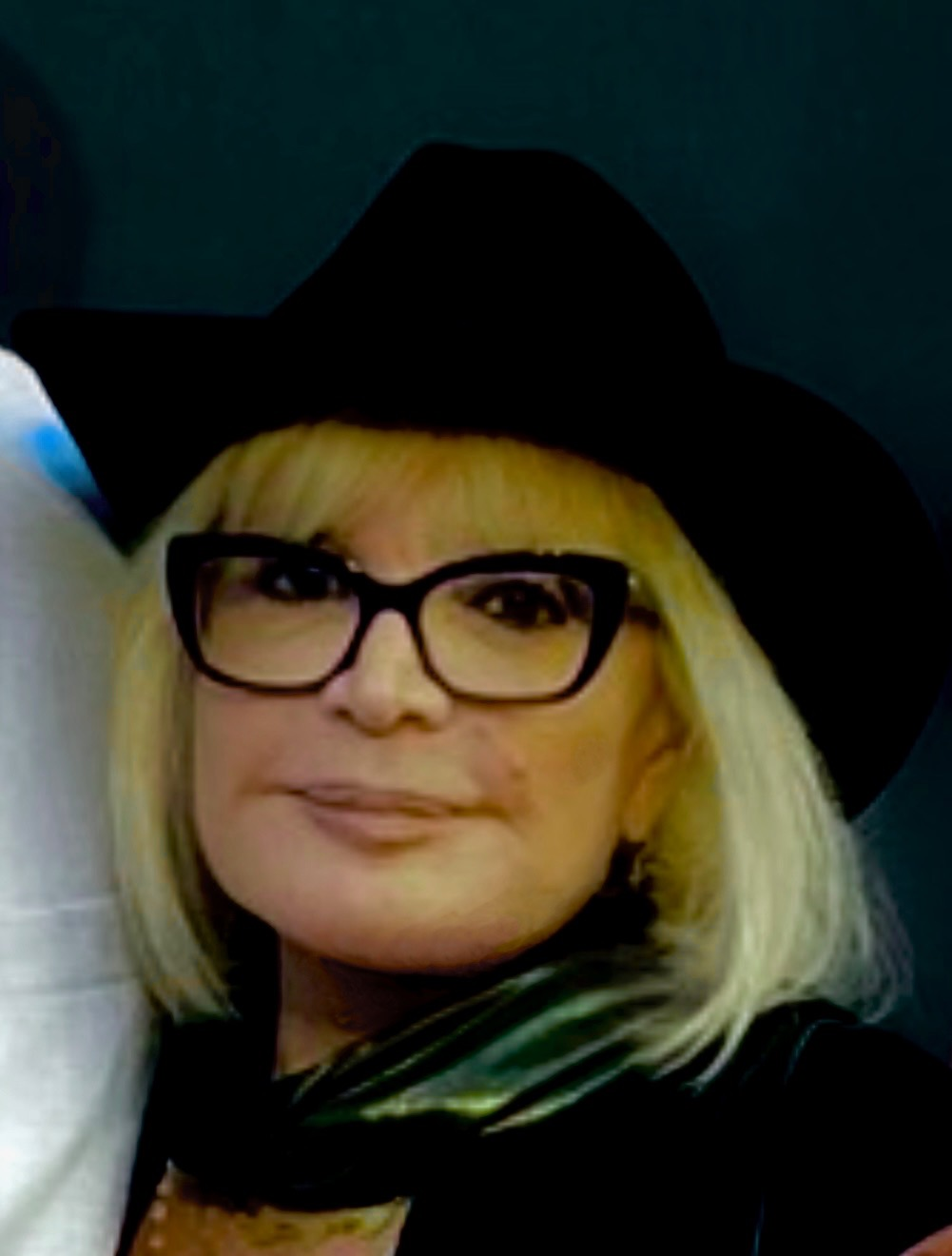
Seda Aznavour at Monsieur Aznavour Premiere in Los Angeles 2025

Seda "Patricia" Aznavour (born Seda Aznavourian on May 21, 1947) is a French singer and artist.

The daughter of singer Charles Aznavour, she studied at the Armenian Virgins College of Paris, at the Jan-Luciere and Matie Alter musical schools.

She started her musical career in the 1960s, as a radio and TV singer, then released the album Rien que nous with David Alexandre Winter. She recorded the soundtrack of the 1970 movie Safo (written by Georges Garvarentz), played in several French films.

In the 1960s, Aznavour moved to the United States, where in 1980 she gave a concert tour with Lucy Saroyan. In 1988, she recorded the album Chants traditionnels arméniens, which included "Yes Qo Ghimetn Chim Gidi" (Ես քո ղիմեթն չիմ գիտի), a song by Sayat-Nova, in a duet with her father. In 2010, they recorded a new duet in Armenian.

== Selected discography ==
- Suis le soleil, United Artists Records
- On ne valse plus à Vienne, FTC / Discodis
- Les Marins, FTC
- Juste un dernier verre, FTC / Sofrason - Saïga
- Pour moi toute seule, United Artists Records
- Rien que nous (with David Alexandre Winter), 1971, Barclay
- Peut-être... !, 1971, Barclay
- Les Champignons hallucinogènes, 1972
- Chants traditionnels arméniens, 1988, MusArm

== Filmography ==
- La Part des lions (The Lion's Share, 1971)
- Paris au mois d'août (Paris in August, 1966)
