= Worry the Bone =

Studio album by Ali Harter
- Released: June 15, 2007
- Recorded: 2006–2007
- Genre: Country, folk, rock, roots
- Label: Little Mafia Records
- Producer: Ali Harter

Ali Harter chronology
Worry the Bone (2007)	No Bees, No Honey. (2010)

Worry the Bone is the first studio album by the Oklahoma-based, singer/songwriter Ali Harter. The album quickly received a whirlwind of attention nationally and internationally. Worry the Bone features hit songs "Untitled No.3" and "You Can Keep 'Em", both of which appeared on the television show Grey's Anatomy.

== Track listing ==
1. "You Can Keep'Em"
2. "Untitled No.3"
3. "What Do Ya Do"
4. "This Might Save Your Life"
5. "Poor Kate"
6. "Everyone Must Lose"
7. "He Is Good To Me"
8. "Now That You're Gone"
9. "I Would"
10. "Run Run"
11. "Can't Resist The Man"
12. "Woman That Mans The Kind"
13. "Lessons" (Live)
