= Tales of the Forgotten Melodies =

Studio album by Wax Tailor
- Released: 22 February 2005
- Recorded: June 2003 – November 2004
- Genre: Trip hop Downtempo; Hip hop
- Length: 49:40
- Label: Lab'oratoire/Undercover
- Producer: Wax Tailor

Tales of the Forgotten Melodies is the debut full-length album by French underground hip hop producer Wax Tailor, released in 2005 on Lab’oratoire/Under Cover labels. The album is released on Decon Media in America, Mole Listening Pearls in Europe and Blend Corp. in Australia & New Zealand.

== Track listing ==
1. "Behind the Curtain (Opening)"
2. "Que sera"
3. "Ungodly Fruit"
4. "Between Fellows"
5. "Hypnosis Theme" (featuring Marina Quaisse)
6. "Damn That Music Made My Day"
7. "Where My Heart's At" (featuring The Others)
8. "Birth of a Struggle"
9. "Am I Free"
10. "Ringing Score"
11. "I Don't Know"
12. "Our Dance" (featuring Charlotte Savary)
13. "Stay Tuned"
14. "Walk the Line" (featuring The Others)
15. "A Woman's Voice"
16. "Don't You Remember"
17. "How I Feel"
18. "Behind the Disguise (Closing)" (featuring Marina Quaisse)
