= No Bees, No Honey =

No Bees, No Honey.

Studio album by Ali Harter
- Released: March 13, 2010
- Recorded: 2008–2010
- Genre: Country, folk, rock, roots
- Length: N/A
- Label: Little Mafia Records
- Producer: Matt Dylan Street and Ali Harter

Ali Harter chronology
| Worry the Bone (2007) | No Bees, No Honey. (2010) |

Professional ratings
Review scores
| Source | Rating |
|---|---|
| Oklahoma Gazette | (?) |

No Bees, No Honey. is the second studio album by the Oklahoma-based, singer/songwriter Ali Harter. It follows her previous album, Worry the Bone.

== Track listing ==
1. "The Girl Who Sings" featuring Matt Dylan Street (Electric Guitar), Daniel Foulks (Violin), Donny Jefferson (Organ), Ben Quinn (Bass, Trumpet) and Des Gyrans (Drums, Percussion)
2. "Lonely Man" featuring Camille Harp (Background Vocals), Charles Plassard (Lead Guitar), Ben Quinn (Bass, Kazoo) and Chris Foreman (Drums)
3. "The Best Mess" featuring Matt Dylan Street (Banjo), Mike Kennerty (Electric Guitar), Heath DeAngelo Nieves (Trumpet) and Ben Quinn (Bass, Mellotron, Percussion)
4. "To My Family” featuring Matt Dylan Street (Bass), Loise Jean Ray (Piano, Organ), Eliza Sweeny (Violin, Cello) and Des Gyrans (Drums, Percussion)
5. "Love I’d Love to Stay" featuring Daniel Foulks (Fiddle)
6. "That Place is Gone” featuring Samantha Crain (Background Vocals), Matt Dylan Street (Background Vocals), Ben Quinn (Bass, Synth) and Des Gyrans (Drums, Percussion)
7. "Grandpa” featuring Matt Dylan Street (Piano, Background Vocals) and Daniel Foulks (Fiddle, Cello)
8. "Dumb Ol Things” featuring Ben Quinn (Bass) and Des Gyrans (Drums, Percussion)
9. "On My Own" featuring John Moreland (Background Vocals), Matt Dylan Street (Electric Guitar), Evan Felker (Dobro, Harmonica), Ben Quinn (Bass) and Des Gyrans (Drums, Percussion)
10. "Never Any Good" featuring Matt Dylan Street (Background ), Louise Jean Ray (Organ), Ben Quinn (Bass) and Des Gyrans (Drums, Percussion)
11. "All Over Me” featuring Evan Felker (Dobro), Daniel Foulks (Violin, Cello) and Des Gyrans (Drums, Percussion)
12. "Close Up the House” featuring Matt Dylan Street (Piano), Ben Quinn (Bass, Tuba), Des Gyrans (Drums, Percussion), Chase Kerby (Bar Vocals), Josh McClesky (Bar Vocals) and Sammy Mitchell (Bar Vocals)
