= Armenians in Switzerland =

Total population
- 3,000–5,000

Regions with significant populations
- Geneva, Zürich, Neuchâtel, Lugano

Languages
- Armenian, German, French, Italian

Religion
- Armenian Apostolic Church

Related ethnic groups
- Armenian diaspora

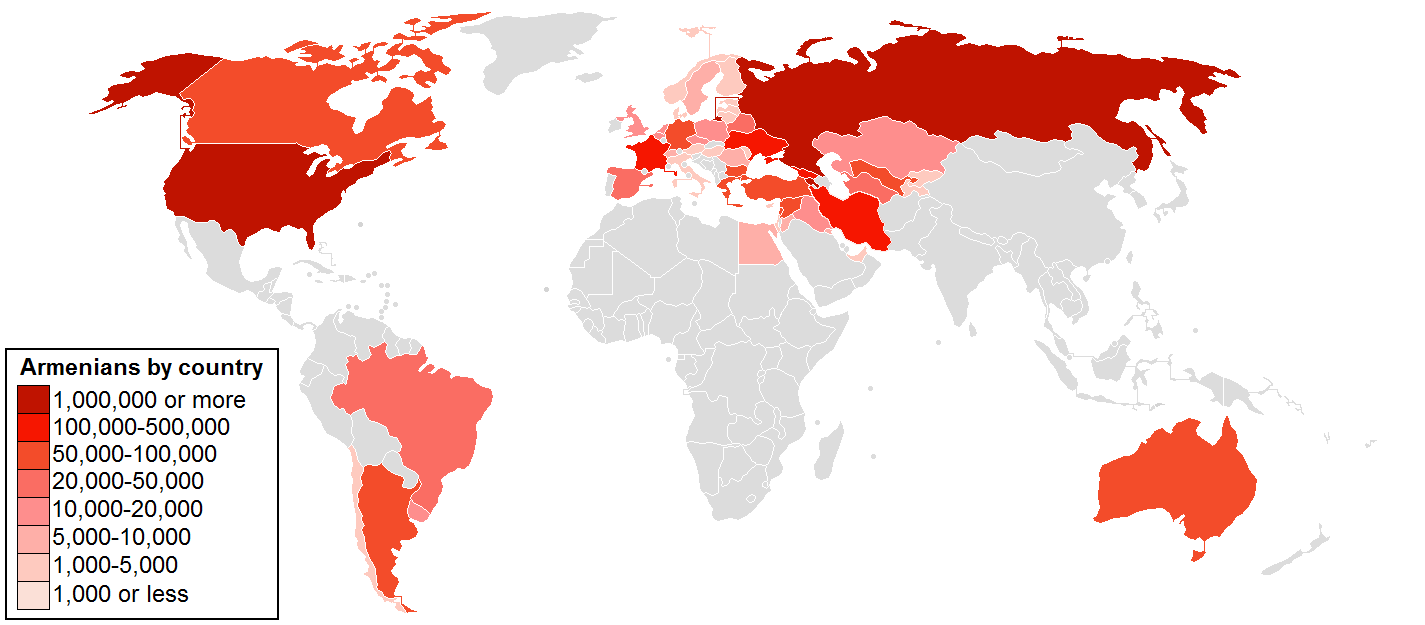
Map of the Armenian diaspora

Swiss-Armenians are citizens of Switzerland of Armenian ancestry. The exact number of Armenians in the country is unknown, but it is unofficially estimated that about 3,000–5,000 Armenians live in Switzerland.

== Background ==
The majority of Swiss Armenians are members of the Armenian Apostolic Church under the jurisdiction of the Mother See of Holy Echmiadzin. There are four church regions (tems): Geneva, Zurich, Neuchatel and Lugano. The Saint Hagop Church in Troinex / Geneva serves mainly the west of the country, whereas Armenians living in the east parts conduct their religious services in a number of sister Swiss churches. There are also a smaller number of Armenian Catholics belonging to the Armenian Catholic Church and even a smaller number of Armenian Evangelicals.

Similarly to Belgium, Switzerland in the early 20th century had a "small Armenian community" primarily concentrated in Geneva "made up of professionals and merchants." Levon Nevruz was appointed by the Armenian government in September 1919 to "represent Armenian interests in Switzerland"; in February 1920, Nevruz became the Armenian "diplomatic representative in Geneva", however, this was disallowed by the Federal Council of Switzerland pending Armenia's de jure recognition by the League of Nations or the major powers.

== Armenian associations ==
A number of Armenian associations operate in Switzerland:

- Union Arménienne de Suisse (UAS) is certainly the biggest operating Armenian association. Based in Geneva, it organizes an annual European Intercommunity Tournament in the city.
- AGBU - Armenian General Benevolent Union - 1211 Geneva, Founded in 1975
- Union Genérale Arménienne de Bienfaisance (UGAB)
- H.O.M – Association de secours arménienne de Suisse with the Swiss branch established in 2006.
- AVZ – Armenischer Verein Zürich in Zurich established in 2005.
- Association des Dames Arméniennes - Genève - Since 1986 it publishes the bilingual Artzakank in French and Armenian.
- Switzerland-Armenia Association / Association Suisse-Arménie / Gesellschaft Schweiz-Armenien, a major community organization for Armenians in Switzerland.
- Centre Arménien de Genève community center near Saint Hagop.

== See also ==
- Armenian diaspora
- Armenians in Austria
- Armenians in France
- Armenians in Germany
- Armenians in Italy
- Armenia–Switzerland relations
- Embassy of Armenia to Switzerland
- Immigration to Switzerland
- List of Armenians
