= Gecko Turner =

Spanish musician and singer-songwriter (born 1966)

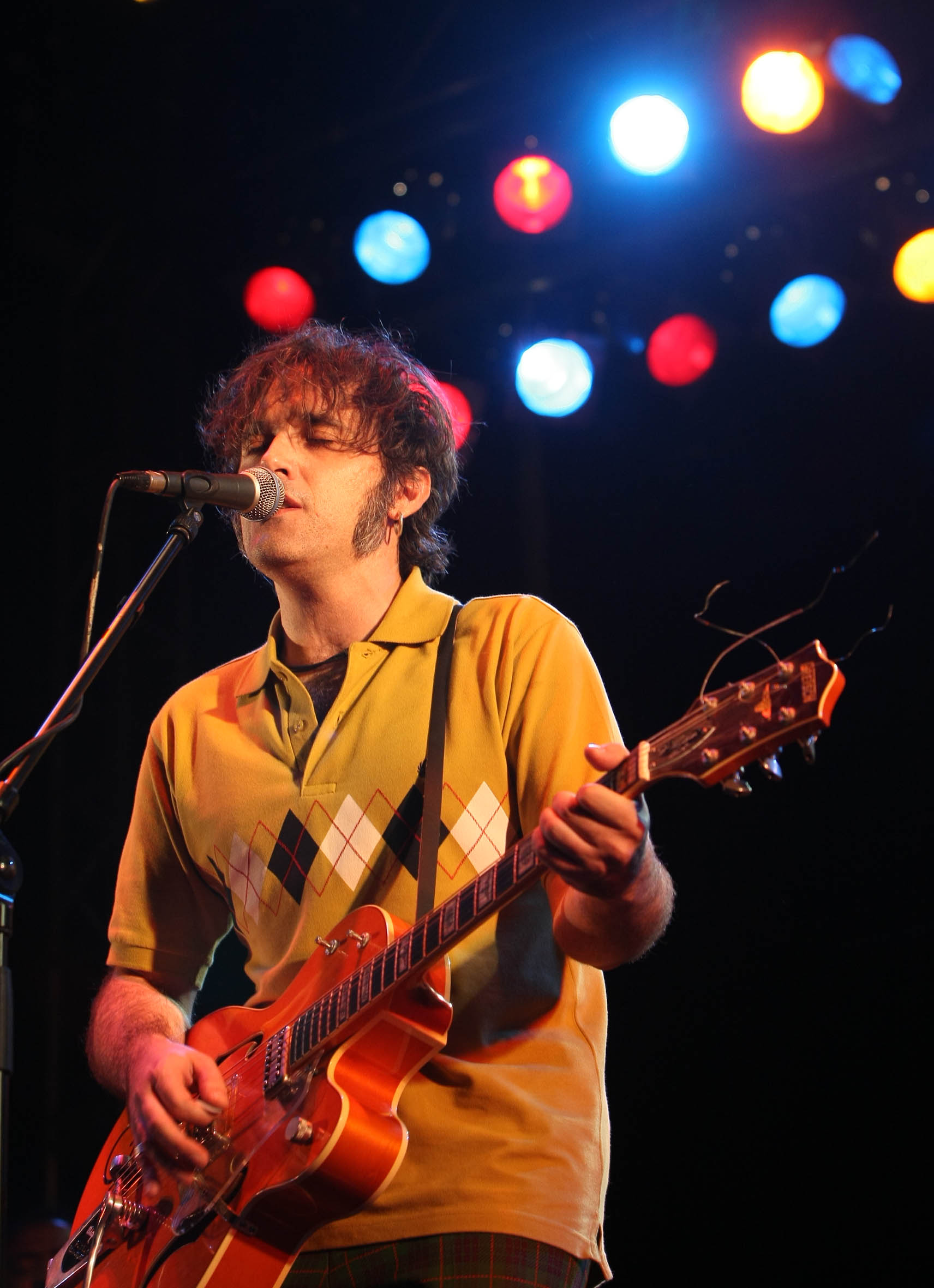
- Gecko Turner live

Background information
- Also known as: Geko Turner
- Born: Fernando Gabriel Echave Peláez; 1966 (age 59–60); Badajoz, Extremadura, Spain
- Genres: bossa nova, soul, funk, reggae, jazz, electronica
- Occupations: Musician, singer-songwriter, producer
- Instruments: Vocals, guitar
- Years active: 1984–present
- Labels: Lovemonk, Quango, Argus Records
- Website: geckoturner.com

Gecko Turner (born Fernando Gabriel Echave Peláez, 1966) is a Spanish musician and singer-songwriter. Based near the border between Spain and Portugal, he has fronted several bands in his native Spain. Guapapasea, his first CD released in the U.S., incorporates bossa nova, soul, funk, reggae, jazz and electronica.

Gecko Turner grew up in Spain, learning English from the blues artists he loved. After a long musical journey, he started composing in a style that combined jazz, blues, samba, reggae, hip-hop, and more into something all his own. Journalists in Spain dubbed it 'Afromeño' (rough translation: African and Extremeño, being Extremadura the region where he comes from), but the sound owes as much to North and South America, the Caribbean and Europe, as it does to Africa. All of his work has been published by Lovemonk Records, in cd and vinyl. Also, Californian label Quango Music Group has published in the United States an American edition of the album "Guapapaséa", as well as several singles.

== Biography ==
Gecko Turner (born Fernando Gabriel Echave Peláez) was raised in Badajoz, Spain, a mid-sized town about halfway between Lisbon and Madrid. As a teenager he fell in love with The Beatles, The Rolling Stones, and Bob Dylan, as well as soaking up the international and Spanish music he heard on the radio. Hearing the Stones sent him on a quest for the music that inspired Jagger and company, and he discovered Elmore James, Lead Belly, Muddy Waters, Jimmy Reed, Big Joe Turner, and other blues artists. He taught himself guitar in his teens and formed a band to cover American and British pop from The Kinks to David Bowie, Talking Heads to James Brown. In his late teens, Turner discovered jazz, finding a special affinity for the Afro-Cuban sounds of Dizzy Gillespie. He hitched all over Spain to follow Gillespie on tour, listening to bebop and reading Jack Kerouac. At 20 he moved to London and busked in tube stations with a borrowed guitar. He did not make much money, but learned how to grab a crowd's attention. He also soaked up London's jazz scene. He returned to Badajoz for his mother's funeral, got married, and took a job in a bank, working nights so he did not have to cut his hair or take out his earrings. When his wife died after a long illness, Turner quit the bank and went back to music full-time.

His first band as a singer, guitarist, and songwriter was called The Animal Crackers, a Joy Division-meets-Sonic Youth aggregation that delighted in its own noise-making. They made two albums and Turner almost went deaf. He quit and started The Revrendoes with his boyhood friend Gene Garcia. He played acoustic guitar while Garcia would blow the blues harp and do his impressions of a Southern American Baptist preacher. In the mid-'90s, Turner moved to Merida and got a job in a 24-track, two-inch tape analog recording studio—the studio where The Animal Crackers albums – Work my body (Jammin', 1992) and Sounds like a hit (Jammin', 1996) were recorded. He learned how to produce records and started Perroflauta ( Flute Dog, a term used for people with a lifestyle similar to Gutter Punks and Hippies.) with Alvaro "Dr. Robelto" Fernandes, bass; Edú Nascimento, guitar; César González, drums, percussion; Irapoan Freire, trumpet; Rogerio Da Sousa, percussion; Rodney d'Assis, percussion; and Markos Bayón, guitar and vocals. Half the band was Brazilian, and they played a blend of samba and reggae. They made several CDs and toured all over Spain. When he went to the copyright office to register his songs, the form had a space for both proper name and an alias. He'd been nicknamed Gecko since boyhood and loved the music of Big Joe Turner, and wrote down Gecko Turner on a whim. When the copyright office sent him a confirmation order addressed to Gecko Turner, he took it as a sign and began using it as his stage name.

When Perroflauta broke up, Turner made demos of the new tunes he had been writing that combined the Brazilian reggae he'd been playing with the blues and rock he'd always loved. Gecko spent his last $1,000 to book time in a small studio in Madrid. He finished the album, and enlisted the big names that helped him make Guapapasea! by promising to pay them when he got a record deal. Lovemonk, a new indie label, put out the album in Europe and Japan, allowing him to pay off the studio and his friends. Turner, who sings in English, Spanish, and Portuguese, put together a band he called the Afrobeatnik Orchestra and toured to support the album. Guapapasea! won Spain's Premio Extremadura a la Creación in 2005, given each year to writers and musicians who have created work that furthers the recognition of the Spanish language as a creative medium. This album was also published by Quango Records in the United States, and this led to a promo tour and several concerts in radio and television in Los Angeles, New York City and Texas, playing prestigious venues like Knitting Factory, in Hollywood, or the vibrant SOB's, in Greenwich Village.

His follow-up album, Chandalismo Illustrado (Sweatsuits Illustrated), is heavy on the funk, with highlife, various Cuban rhythms, and a Tom Waits tribute adding to his already eclectic blend. It was considered by English magazine Swell one of the best 20 records of the year, including all genres and styles, and also acclaimed as revelation of the year by the readers of El Pais EP3. He continued playing concerts in Spain, Denmark, Sweden and Germany, where he plays in Berlin during the 2006 FIFA World Cup. In September, the album was also released in Japan by Argus Records, so he played a concert in Tokyo for his Japanese fans.

In 2007 Gecko Turner moves to the United States, and started working on new songs and doing recording session with musicians in Austin and Los Angeles. Next year Lovemonk Records released a cd called Manipulado, which compiles different remixes of Gecko's songs already published in 7" and 12" vinyls. In 2009, Gecko is deep into finishing his next album, Gone Down South. It was published (both in vinyl and cd) in 2010 by Lovemonk Records, with an artwork style that evokes that old sixties jazz covers. The first single was "Truly", a rendition of the classic Motown productions that he loves so much.

During the last years, Gecko Turner's songs have been required by over 70 compilations released all over the world, and they have been used in several TV commercials and a few films, like Isabel Coixet Elegy, Montxo Armendáriz Obaba, No tengas miedo and Mexican director Jorge Colon's Cansada de besar sapos. Also, his work as a producer led him to work with such a different artists like Californian jazz and blues singer Brenda Boykin, and the flamenco singer (recently deceased) Fernando Terremoto, recording for both of them their albums, Chocolate and Chilli, and Terremoto.

== Discography ==
=== Albums ===
- Guapapaséa (Lovemonk, 2003)
1. Subterranean Homesick Blue
2. Sabes Quien Te Quiere
3. Limón en La Cabeza
4. Te Estás Equivocando
5. How Come You Do Me Like You Do Me?
6. Rainbow Country
7. Monka Mongas # Did Ya Black Up Today?
8. Dime Que Te Quéa
9. Niña Del Guadiana
10. Dizzie
11. $45.000 (Guapa Pasea)
- Chandalismo Ilustrado (Lovemonk, 2006)
1. En La Calle on the Street
2. Monosabio Blues
3. Que Papa E Esse
4. Toda Mojaíta
5. Coco Pinda
6. Daughterbitchin' And Motherfuckin' Style
7. Pal Peru
8. Tieso (Y Sin Desayuna)
9. Tontorronea
10. 48th African Davies
11. 'Fess It Girl
12. Afrobeatnik
13. Raise Up Standards
14. Joyina
15. Sycamore Blues
- Manipulado (Lovemonk, 2008)
1. Monosabio – Philip Owusu Rmx
2. $45.000 (Guapa Pesa) – Afrodisiac Soundsystem Rmx
3. Tontorroneá – Gecko's Tonto Edit
4. Un Limón En La Cabeza – Quantic Rmx
5. En La Calle, On The Street – The Dining Rooms Afrojazz Rmx
6. Rainbow Country – Instituto Mexicano Del Sonido Remix
7. Toda Mojaíta – Dutch Rhythm Combo Rmx
8. Sycamore Blues – Dublex Inc. Rmx
9. Afrobeatnik – Seiji Rmx
10. Tieso (Y Sin Desayuná) – Gordon Blackbeard's Scotch Mist Rmx
11. Dizzie – Boozoo Bajou Rmx
12. 45.000 $ (Guapa Pasea) – Watch TV Remix
13. Toda Mojaíta – Danny Lewis Afrofuturistic Mix
14. Un Limón En La Cabeza- Quantic Dub
- Gone Down South (Lovemonk, 2010)
1. Truly
2. Cuanta Suerte
3. So Sweet
4. Tea Time
5. Amame, Mimame
6. You Can't Own Me
7. Mbira Bira
8. Holly Hollywood
9. Let's Say Tonight
10. The Love Monk
11. When I Work Up
12. Gone Down South.
- That Place by the Thing with the Cool Name (Lovemonk, 2015)
1. I'll Do That
2. Bee Eater
3. Corazón De Jesús
4. Chicken Wire
5. Medium Rare
6. Did You Ever Wonder Why?
7. Here Comes Friday
8. Oye, Muchacha
9. Extremely Good
10. Little Sonny
11. Juanita
12. Rockin' Diddley
13. This Is The One
14. The Strange Adventures Of Two Runaway Elephants in Kentish Town

=== Singles ===
- "Un limón en la cabeza" 7" (Lovemonk, 2004)
- "Guapapasea" 7" (Lovemonk, 2004)
- "Monka Mongas" / "Rainbow Country" 7" (Lovemonk, 2004)
- "Afrobeatnik" 12" (Lovemonk, 2006)
- "Toda Mojaíta" 12" (Lovemonk, 2007)
- "Monosabio Blues" 7" (Lovemonk, 2007)
- "Manipulado EP" 12" (Lovemonk, 2008)
- "Truly" 7" (Lovemonk, 2010)
- "You Can't Own Me" / "When I Woke Up Remixed" 12" (Lovemonk, 2011)
- "When I Woke Up" / "Ámame Mímame Remixed" 12" (Lovemonk, 2011)
- "That Place By The Remixes" (Lovemonk, 2015)
