= Ali Harter =

American singer-songwriter (born 1984)

- Born: Ali Harter; 20 June 1984 (age 41); Oklahoma City, Oklahoma, U.S.
- Genres: Country, folk, roots, rock, indie
- Occupations: musician, songwriter
- Instruments: Vocals, guitar
- Years active: 1998–present

Ali Harter (born June 20, 1984) is an American singer/songwriter from Oklahoma City, Oklahoma. She has played in several bands, but primarily as a solo musician for over twelve years. Harter is a veteran of the national and international music scene.

Ali has joined up with WARM Music/Big Green Bamboo, a European publishing company, which has given her an opportunity to explore the commercial side of the music industry. Ali has begun writing and recording original music for television advertising campaigns. Ali has also brought in Cory Allen as her publicist, who is known for his work with controversial sculptor Daniel Edwards.

== Collaborations ==
Ali can also be heard collaborating on the new Wax Tailor album, available in September 2009, on the first single, which she co-wrote with Wax Tailor and New Orleans' 'Voice', titled, ‘This Train'.

== Touring ==
Ali has shared the stage with such acts as: John Mayall, Meg & Dia, Magnolia Electric Co., Steel Train, Dierks Bentley, Miranda Lambert, War of Ages, Flee the Seen, and has shared festival billing with The Flaming Lips, Leon Russell, Ben Harper, Tori Amos, PJ Harvey, Amos Lee, Limbeck, The Black Crowes, Cake, Damone, as well as many others.

On Mar 4th, 2010, two songs from Harter's 2007 album Worry the Bone were featured on the popular ABC prime-time drama Grey's Anatomy. The songs You Can Keep'Em and Untitled No. 3 were featured on episode 16 Perfect Little Accident of Season 6.

== Discography ==
- Worry the Bone (album) (2007)
- No Bees, No Honey. (album) (2010)
- Near The Knuckle (album) (2020)

== Kickstarter Controversy ==
Ali Harter was the subject of mild controversy from her fan base for failing to deliver on a funded Kickstarter project. 148 fans funded over $12,000 for the promise of an album entitled 'Near the Knuckle' in 2013. Due to a series of catastrophic life events, the finished album was shelved shortly after its completion. In early 2019 Harter announced that her family was on the mend and that the record would be released later that year. Updates can be found on the original kickstarter campaign and at www.pigsflyshop.com
