= Armenia–Switzerland relations =

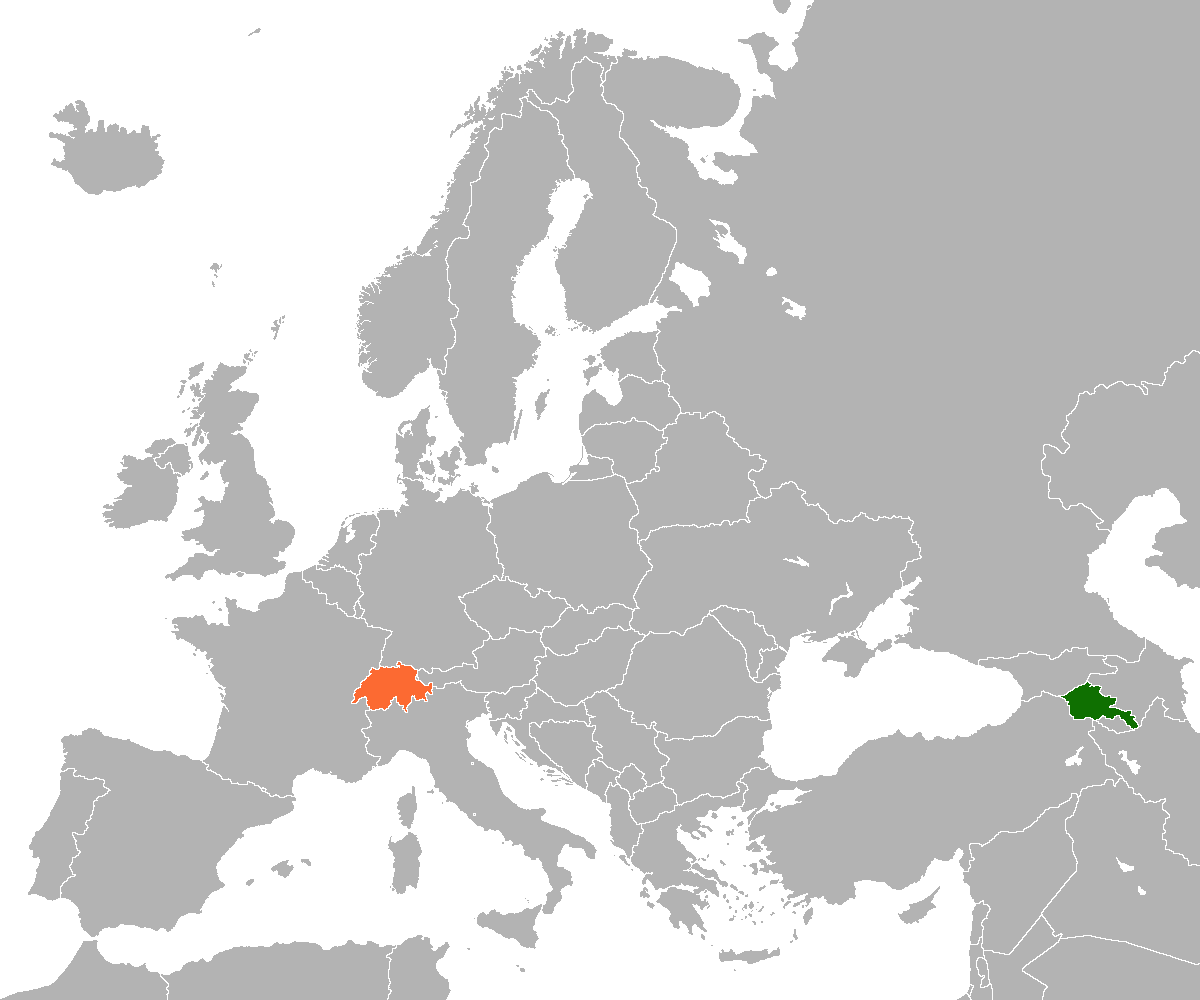

- Armenia: Switzerland

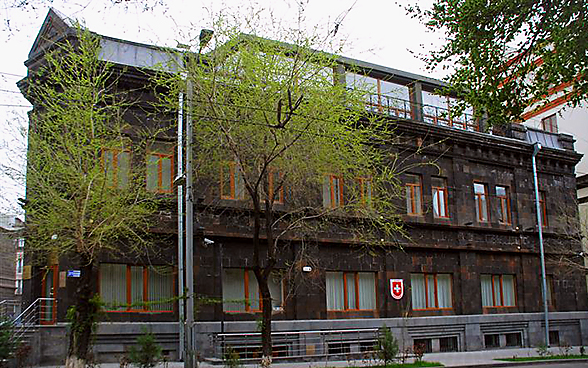
Embassy of Switzerland in Yerevan

Armenia–Switzerland relations refers to the bilateral relations between Armenia and the Switzerland. Switzerland recognised the independence of Armenia on 23 December 1991, and the two countries established diplomatic relations on 30 April 1992. Armenia has an embassy in Bern, while Switzerland has an embassy in Yerevan. It has supported Armenia through development assistance, peacebuilding efforts in the South Caucasus, and diplomatic mediation between Armenia and Turkey.

Switzerland provides assistance through regional cooperation programs focused on good governance, economic development, and climate-related initiatives. It also offers scholarship opportunities to Armenian researchers. Bilateral trade includes Swiss exports of pharmaceuticals, machinery, and watches, while Armenia exports watchmaking products and textiles to Switzerland.

== History ==
In 1988, Switzerland sent humanitarian assistance to Armenia following the Spitak earthquake, during the period when Armenia was still part of the Soviet Union.

In 2002, Armenia appointed its first ambassador to Switzerland. Switzerland opened an embassy in Yerevan in 2011, establishing a resident diplomatic presence. Before that, the Swiss ambassador to Armenia was based in Tbilisi, Georgia, under concurrent accreditation.

== Armenian genocide recognition ==
The Grand Council of Geneva recognized the Armenian genocide in 2001, followed by the Swiss Federal Assembly in 2003. A monument commemorating the genocide, Les Réverbères de la Mémoire ("Streetlights of Memory"), was approved in 2008 but faced delays due to local opposition and diplomatic sensitivity involving Turkey. After a decade of controversy, it was finally unveiled in Geneva’s Parc Tremblay in 2018. The following year, the Swiss Federal Court rejected appeals from residents opposing the memorial, ruling that they were not directly affected by its presence.

While Swiss law criminalized denial of the Armenian genocide, the European Court of Human Rights ruled in 2015 that Switzerland had violated the free speech rights of Turkish politician Dogu Perincek, who was convicted in 2005 for public comments made in Switzerland. The court found the conviction disproportionate and unnecessary to protect the Armenian community, and clarified that it was not ruling on whether the 1915 events constituted genocide under international law.

== See also ==
- Embassy of Armenia to Switzerland
- Foreign relations of Armenia
- Foreign relations of Switzerland
- Armenians in Switzerland
