= Dirty Linen =

Dirty Linen may refer to:

- Dirty Linen (magazine), a magazine of folk and world music based in Baltimore, Maryland
- Dirty Linen and New-Found-Land, a pair of two 1976 Tom Stoppard plays
- Dirty Linen (film), a 1999 Italian comedy film
- Dirty Linen (TV series), a 2023 Philippine drama series on the Kapamilya Channel
