= Wax Tailor =

French musical artist (born 1975)

- Born: Jean-Christophe Le Saoût; Vernon, Normandy, France
- Genres: Trip hop, turntablism, hip hop, downtempo, electronica, electro swing
- Occupations: Record producer, composer, disc jockey, talent manager
- Years active: 2001–present
- Label: Lab'Oratoire
- Website: waxtailor.com

Jean-Christophe Le Saoût (French pronunciation: [ʒɑ̃ kʁistɔf lə su]; born on 19 July 1975), better known by the stage name Wax Tailor, is a French record producer, DJ, and talent manager. He has released six studio albums in collaboration with other artists.

== Early career ==
After being a host on French radio in the Paris suburb of Mantes-la-Jolie, Le Saoût started the French rap group La Formule in the 1990s. He created his label Lab'Oratoire in 1998. He began working on the Wax Tailor project in 2001, first appearing on a remix of Looptroop and La Formule's "Deep Under Water".

== Releases ==
In 2004, JC Le Saoût launched the Wax Tailor project with an EP, Lost the Way, that gained the attention of DJs and music critics in his home country.

In 2005, Wax Tailor released his debut album, Tales of the Forgotten Melodies. In addition to sampling Nina Simone, Doris Day and Alfred Hitchcock films, the album also featured collaborations with The Others and Charlotte Savary.

In 2007, Wax Tailor released his second album, Hope & Sorrow, and had his first crossover hit single with "Positively Inclined".

On 21 September 2009, Wax Tailor released "Say Yes", the first single from his new album In the Mood for Life, featuring Charlie Winston, Charlotte Savary, Sara Genn, Dionne Charles, A State of Mind, Mattic, Ali Harter, and Speech Defect.

In 2012, after three years of touring around the world, Wax Tailor released Dusty Rainbow from the Dark. The album was narrated by actor Don McCorkindale, whom Le Saoût selected after listening to nearly 300 voices.

In 2014, to celebrate the 10th anniversary of his career, Wax Tailor launched the Phonovisions Symphonic Orchestra. Alongside a 35-piece orchestra and a 17-person choir, Wax Tailor embarked on a re-orchestration of 27 highlights from his 4 albums, to present them in a different setting. After a sold-out European tour, the Orchestra was chosen to play 3 shows for the re-opening of the Teatro Colon in Bogotá, accompanied by the National Symphony Orchestra of Colombia.

In 2016, Wax Tailor released his fifth album By Any Beats Necessary. The title references the Malcolm X phrase "By Any Means Necessary", which was inspired by Sartre's play "Dirty Hands". The album features collaborations with Ghostface Killah from the Wu-Tang Clan, R.A. the Rugged Man, A-F-R-O, Token, Tricky, Lee Fields, Charlotte Savary, Sara Genn, Mattic and Raashan Ahmad and IDIL.

In 2017, Wax Tailor went on a long world tour, during which he decided to completely remix the album. Established producers such as Ollie Teeba (The Herbaliser) and the US duo Du-Rites (J-Zone), as well as a cohort of rising artists such as ProleteR, Soul Square, The Geek x Vrv, Poldoore, Kognitif, Fatbabs, Madwreck, Benji Blow and Le Parasite, were selected by Wax Tailor to keep the project musically cohesive and bring new life to the album.

In January 2021, Wax Tailor released The Shadow of Their Suns, his sixth studio album, featuring guest artists Mark Lanegan, Del The Funky Homosapien (Gorillaz), D Smoke, Gil Scott Heron, Rosemary Standley (Moriarty), Mr Lif, Adeline, and Yugen Blakrok.

In January 2023, Wax Tailor released Fishing For Accidents. The album featured appearances from Mick Jenkins, Mr. Lif, Kuf Knotz, Lojii, Napoleon Da Legend, Ill Conscious, Voice Monet, David Bars, Mattic, Jennifer Charles (Elysian Fields) and Victoria Bigelow. This album will be followed by an international tour in the United States, Europe, and Asia.

In March 2025, to celebrate the 20th anniversary of his debut album Tales Of The Forgotten Melodies, he went back on tour in the United States and Canada.

== Awards ==
- Winner of 2013 Sacem Electronic Music Prize
- Winner in 2008 of the 7th annual Independent Music Awards Vox Pop vote for best Dance/Electronica album Hope & Sorrow
- Three of his albums, Hope & Sorrow, In The Mood for Life, and Dusty Rainbow From The Dark were nominated for Best Electronic Album at the Victoires de la Musique in France.

== Discography ==
=== Albums ===
Year	Album	Peak positions	Certification
Year	Album	FRA	Certification
2005	Tales of the Forgotten Melodies	150	
2007	Hope & Sorrow	31	
2009	In the Mood for Life	9	
2012	Dusty Rainbow from the Dark	8	
2016	By Any Beats Necessary	12	
2017	By Any Remixes Necessary		
2021	The Shadow of Their Suns	14	
2023	Fishing for Accidents	137	

Live albums

Year	Album	Peak positions	Certification
Year	Album	FRA	Certification
2010	Live 2010 à l'Olympia	62	
2014	Phonovisions Symphonic Orchestra		

=== EPs and singles ===
Year	Title	Peak positions	Certification	Album
Year	Title	FRA	Certification	Album
2004	Que Sera/Where My Heart's At			
2004	Lost the Way			
2006	Our Dance/Walk the Line			Tales of the Forgotten Melodies
2007	To Dry Up/The Games You Play	78		Hope and Sorrow
2007	Positively Inclined / The Way We Lived	78		Hope and Sorrow
2008	We Be / There Is Danger	78		Hope and Sorrow
2009	"Say Yes" (feat. ASM)	30		In the Mood for Life
2009	This Train" / "Leave It	25		In the Mood for Life
2010	I Own You			In the Mood for Life
2012	Heart Stop	81		Dusty Rainbow from the Dark
2016	I Had a Woman	194		
2017	The Chase Remixes			

=== Remixes ===
- Looptroop & La Formule - Deep Under Water (Wax Tailor remix) 2001
- Clover - Death of the Lonely Superhero (Wax Tailor remix) 2005
- Wax Tailor - Our Dance (Wax Tailor Remix) 2006
- Nina Simone - I Am Blessed 2008

=== Covers, references, and sampling ===
- His track Seize The Day recorded with Charlotte Savary appears in the soundtrack of the 2008 film Paris by Cédric Klapisch.
