= Bitter:Sweet =

American trip hop duo

- Origin: Los Angeles, California
- Genres: Trip hop; electronica; alternative hip hop; nu jazz
- Years active: 2006–present
- Label: Quango
- Members: Shana Halligan
- Past members: Kiran Shahani
- Website: bittersweetmusic.com

Bitter:Sweet is an American trip hop band with jazz-like influences from Los Angeles, California. Shana Halligan provides vocals, lyrics and composes the songs, while collaborating with a myriad of notable producers of various genres.

== History ==
They have been listed on the Top 10 on the iTunes Store electronic chart and have been placed on radio station KCRW's Top 5 Most Requested CD for the week of March 20, 2006. Additionally, they have been featured on the soundtrack of The Devil Wears Prada, in Episode 2 ("I Am a Tree") of Season 3 of Grey's Anatomy, in Episode 7 ("The Ringer") of Season 1 of Moonlight, in Episode 1 ("Pilot") of Lipstick Jungle, in Episode 17 ("Sleeper") of Season 7 of Smallville, in Episode 13 ("Betrayed") of Season 7 of Law and Order: Criminal Intent, the advertisements for Samantha Who? and Victoria's Secret (featuring the track "Dirty Laundry"), in the movies Because I Said So and Shoot 'Em Up, in a Zune advertisement (and the device itself), and also placed on MSN's list for "Ones to Watch". The song "Dirty Laundry" also appears on a commercial for the show "Greek" in the United Arab Emirates. A snippet of their single, "I Get What I Want," appears at the end of an episode of "Castle" (Season 1, Episode 9).

The band was formed when Halligan answered an ad listed on Craigslist for a singer posted by Rick Torres and Kiran Shahani, who had previously founded the Supreme Beings of Leisure. Their 11-track debut album, The Mating Game, was released April 4, 2006, under Quango Music Group.

In early 2007, Bitter:Sweet's The Mating Game won in The 6th Annual Independent Music Awards for Best Pop/Rock Album. In summer of 2007, Bitter:Sweet released The Remix Game, featuring reworked versions of tracks from The Mating Game by producers such as Thievery Corporation, Fort Knox Five, Jed Smith and Skeewiff. These tracks were previously available only on vinyl, or unreleased.

In early February 2008, it was announced that the duo would release an album of new material called Drama, due for release June 3, 2008. A 30-second preview for their new song "The Bomb", which was used as the theme music for Lipstick Jungle, could be heard on their MySpace page. On September 4, 2008 "The Bomb" was added to the download list for the game Tap Tap Revenge. An instrumental version of "The Bomb" was used in the trailer for Tony Gilroy's Duplicity, starring Julia Roberts and Clive Owen. A slightly modified version of the song was used for the 2010 ad campaign for the Lagoon Amusement Park in Utah. Furthermore, "Dirty Laundry" from the album The Mating Game was used as an intro for the German television series Doctor's Diary which started airing in 2008.

The song "Trouble" appeared in several trailers for the 2011 film Cars 2.

In addition, Shana Halligan recently toured and recorded with Nouvelle Vague and is featured on Serj Tankian's Imperfect Harmonies released in September 2010. She is also featured in Buckethead's "Waiting Hare", alongside Serj Tankian. Halligan is a frequent collaborator with Thievery Corporation having co-written and sung their recent hit, Depth of My Soul.

Following the release of The Break Up in 2010, Shana Halligan embarked on a solo career, starting with the release of her first solo EP Paper Butterfly in November 2011, which peaked on the iTunes charts at #3. This was followed in September 2012 by her first full length solo album, Richmond Parade. Her second solo album, Back To Me, was released on Plug Research Records and heavily supported by KCRW, with Halligan performing live on Morning Becomes Eclectic (Live at KCRW).

In 2025, Halligan revived the band, releasing Bitter:Sweet's first album since 2010 titled "Back To Me." Bitter:Sweet is set to release a new album in late 2026.

== Discography ==
=== Albums ===
- The Mating Game (2006)
- The Remix Game (2007)
- Drama (2008)
- The Break Up (2010)
- Trilogy (2015)
- Baby Is Back (2025)
