= Shana Halligan =

American singer

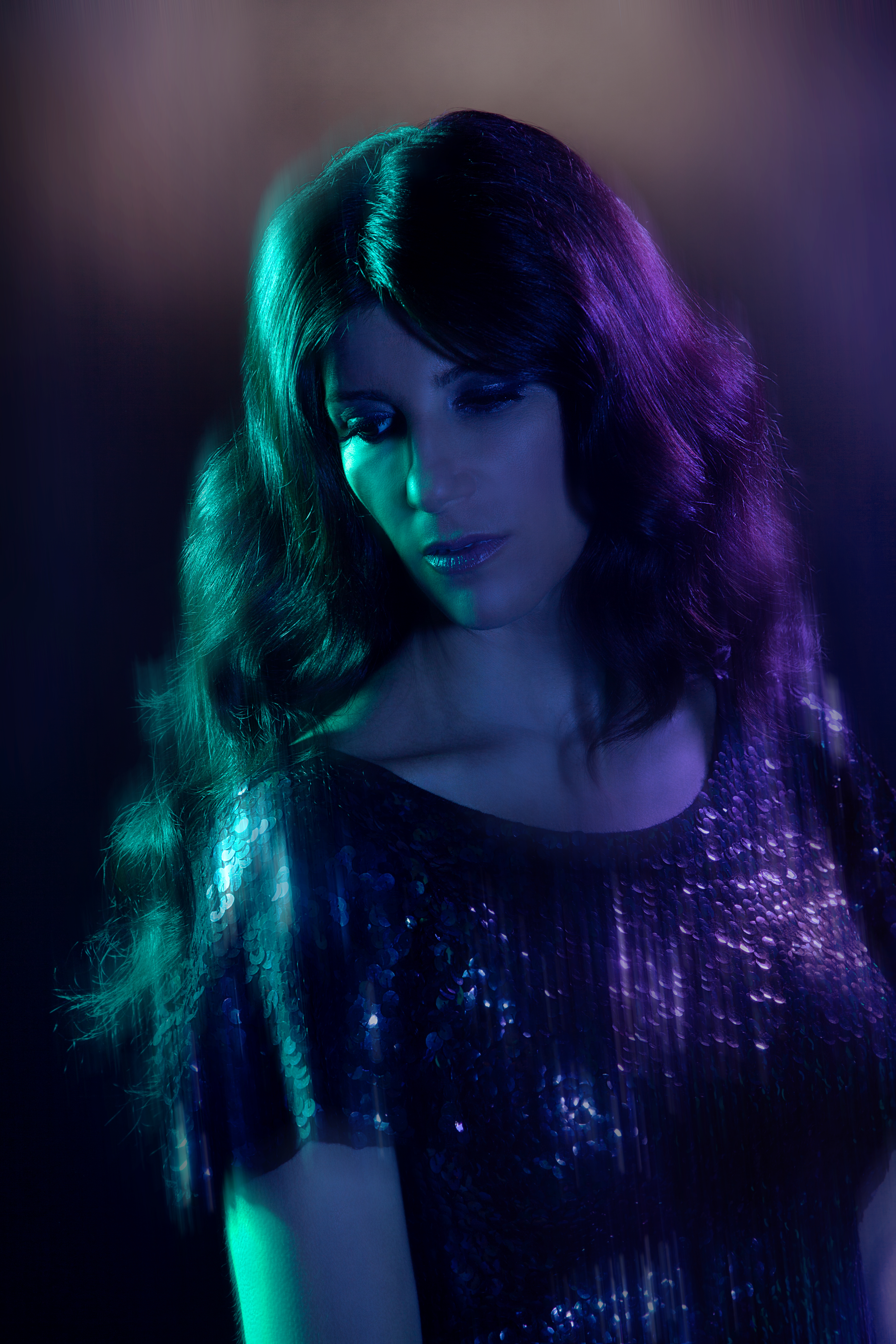
- Halligan in 2015

Background information
- Born: Shana Beth Halligan; October 11, 1973 (age 52)
- Origin: Los Angeles, California, U.S.
- Genres: Trip hop; electronica; nu jazz
- Years active: 2006–present
- Website: shanahalligan.com

Shana Beth Halligan (born October 11, 1973) is a singer, songwriter, and composer based in Los Angeles, California. Halligan is best known for her work as the co-founder, songwriter and vocalist for the trip-hop act Bitter:Sweet. She is the daughter of Dick Halligan, a founding member of the American rock band Blood, Sweat & Tears. In 2018, she appeared as a contestant in season 14 of the American series The Voice.

== History ==
Halligan joined the band Bitter:Sweet in 2006 after answering an ad listed on Craigslist for a singer posted by Rick Torres and Kiran Shahani, who had previously founded the Supreme Beings of Leisure. Their 11-track debut album The Mating Game was released April 4, 2006, under Quango Music Group. The band proceeded to release three more albums and then a six single/EP aptly titled "The Break Up," on December 28, 2010. The band then officially broke up. Halligan revived the band in 2025 with the release of the album "Baby Is Back."

After the official end of Bitter:Sweet, Halligan moved to Europe to explore her solo career, resulting in music collaborations with French musical collective Nouvelle Vague and UK producer Alex Cowan. During this time, she is also featured on Serj Tankian's September 2010 release Imperfect Harmonies.

On November 29, 2011, Halligan released her debut solo EP, Paper Butterfly under Lady Swank Music, a label imprint founded by Thievery Corporation co-founder Rob Garza. This was followed in September 2012 by her first full-length solo album, Richmond Parade.

In January 2014, Halligan collaborated with Thievery Corporation to write and record, "Depth of My Soul," a single from the band's album Saudade. She later performed the song live with the band at JBL Live at Pier 97 in New York on August 15, 2015.

Halligan's second solo album, Back To Me, was released on October 15, 2015, under Plug Research Records. and supported by the KCRW with Halligan performing the album live on Morning Becomes Eclectic (Live at KCRW) on January 25, 2016.

On April 5, 2016, Halligan was named the official spokeswoman for the Children's Music Fund, a Los Angeles-based non-profit devoted to providing music therapy for sick children.

In 2025, Halligan released Bitter:Sweet's first new album since 2010 with the release of "Baby Is Back." Halligan is set to release another new Bitter:Sweet album in late 2026.

=== On The Voice ===
In 2018, Halligan appeared as a contestant on the U.S. singing competition reality series The Voice broadcast by NBC. She auditioned with the song "Bang Bang (My Baby Shot Me Down)". The episode was broadcast on March 12, 2018. Only one judge, Alicia Keys turned her chair and she became part of Team Alicia by default. On March 19, 2018, she was confronted in the Battles Round with teammate Christiana Danielle, both singing "Use Somebody". Alicia Keys opted for Danielle, and Halligan was eliminated from the competition.

== Discography ==
=== Albums ===
- Richmond Parade (2012)
- Back to Me (2015)

=== Singles & EPs ===
- Paper Butterfly (2011)
- Back to Me (The Remixes) (2016)

== Collaborations ==
- Enter The Chicken by Buckethead & Friends (2005); vocals on the song Waiting Hare
- Dusty Rainbow from the Dark by Wax Tailor (2012); vocals on the song "No Regret"
