= Charlotte Savary =

French singer and songwriter

- Born: 24 December 1979 (age 46)
- Origin: Saint-Germain-en-Laye, Île-de-France, France
- Genres: Folk music, trip hop
- Occupations: Singer, songwriter
- Years active: 2001 – present
- Labels: At(h)ome; Under Cover
- Website: www.charlottesavary.com

Charlotte Savary (French pronunciation: [ʃaʁlɔt savaʁi]; born 24 December 1979) is a French singer and songwriter, participating in electropop, trip hop and folk music projects. These projects are SEYES and Wax Tailor. She also was a singer in two bands called Clover and Felipecha, and released her solo debut in 2016.

== Discography ==
- 2004 : Clover – World's End Lane
- 2004 : Wax Tailor – Lost The Way (EP)
- 2005 : Wax Tailor – Tales of the Forgotten Melodies (featured on "Our Dance")
- 2006 : Wax Tailor – Our dance / Walk the line (EP)
- 2007 : Wax Tailor – Hope & Sorrow (featured on "The man With No Soul", "To Dry Up" et "Alien in My Belly")
- 2007 : Wax Tailor – The games you play / To dry up (EP)
- 2008 : Felipecha – De fil en aiguille
- 2009 : Wax Tailor – In The Mood For Life (featured on "Dragon Chasers", "Go Without Me" et "Fireflies" and "Greenfields")
- 2011 : Felipecha – Les Lignes de Fuite
- 2012 : Wax Tailor - Dusty Rainbow from the Dark(featured on "Dusty Rainbow")
- 2014 : Wax Tailor & The Phonovison Symphony Orchestra - Live
- 2016 : Charlotte Savary - Seasons
- 2016 : Wax Tailor & The Phonovison Symphony Orchestra - By Any Beats Necessary (featured on "Bleed Away" with Tricky)
- 2020 : SEYES - "Beauty Dies", new downtempo/trip-hop female duet
- 2020 : DENDANA - "Je n'ai pas les mots" (featured on "Rising Of The Veil" and "Tout Finira", backing singer on all tracks)
