= Quango Music Group =

Quango Music Group is a record label founded in 1995 by Bruno Guez. Island Records distributed their releases.

From 1995 to 2010, Quango developed a tastemaker brand with a cult following. Quango's repertoire consisted of artists and global-centric compilations totaling more than 50 releases, including, Kruder and Dorfmeister, Zero 7, Koop, Bliss, Cantoma, Bitter:Sweet, Gecko Turner, Talvin Singh, Bomb the Bass, and Alex Reece. With over 50 records released through Island Records and Palm Pictures, Quango represented the emerging electronic sounds from around the world with a diverse roster of artists, and innovative concept compilations.

== Background ==
The vision for Quango was created by Bruno Guez, the popular LA-based DJ, producer and tastemaker. Guez was joined by Jason Bentley (KCRW/KROQ-FM DJ) to create the Quango aesthetic via compilations and artist albums that are widely acknowledged as being ahead of their time. In all, 28 titles were released through Island Records featuring early tracks by the likes of Tricky, Sneaker Pimps and Basement Jaxx amongst many others. Releases included the first Kruder and Dorfmeister G-Stoned EP and Talvin Singh's Anokha. Compilations included Abstract Vibes, World Groove and the Journey into Ambient Groove series.

During this time, Bruno also developed the programming and musical branding of Chris Blackwell's Island Outpost chain boutique hotels in Miami, the Bahamas, and Jamaica.

A decade later, Bruno continues to work closely with Chris Blackwell, executive producing Martina Topley-Bird's debut album as well as spearheading the musical direction of a new series of quintessential world music DVD projects for Blackwell's Palm World Voices label.

Quango represents and/or distributes Sunny Levine, Bitter:Sweet, Rosey, Slow Train Soul, Fat Freddy's Drop, Djosos Krost, Novalima, Kraak and Smaak, Gecko Turner, Cantoma, Bliss, Natalie Walker and Zero 7.

== Revelator ==
Along with its experience from Quango, Bruno Guez has also created Revelator, a SAAS platform to run an independent music business.

== See also ==
- Lists of record labels
