= Charles Aznavour discography =

- Studio albums: 51
- Extended plays: 58
- Live albums: 23
- Compilation albums: 107
- Singles: 168
- Video albums: 21
- Collaborations: 55
- International Studio Albums: 41
- International EPs: 15
- International Singles: 73
- International Compilation Albums: 74
- Box sets: 23

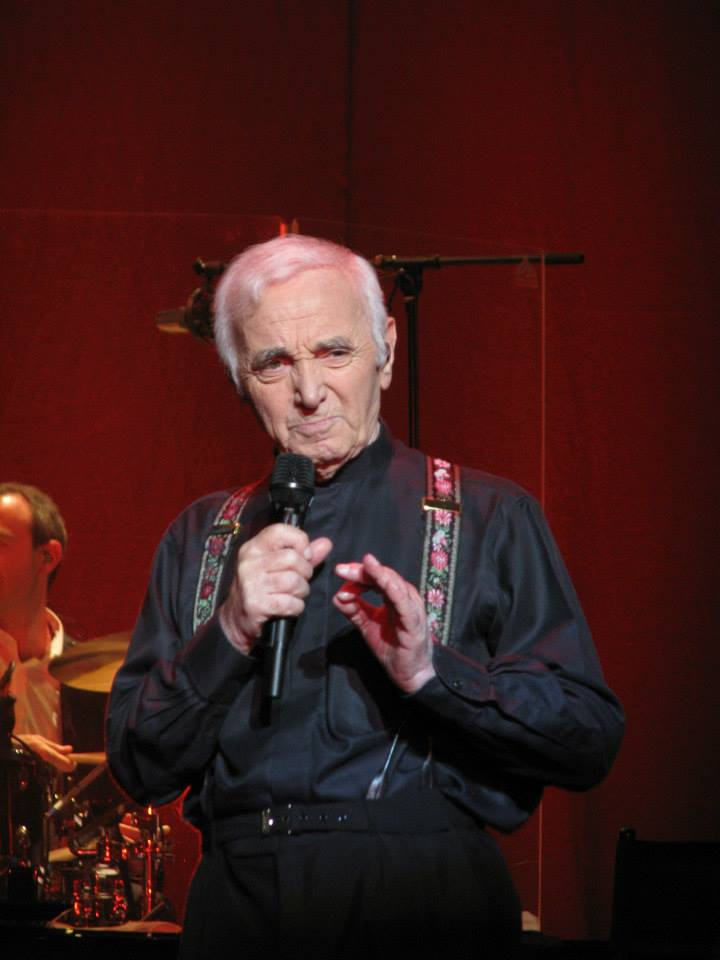

This is a discography for Charles Aznavour.

In a career as a composer/singer/songwriter that spanned over 70 years, Charles Aznavour recorded more than 1,200 songs interpreted in nine languages. He has written or co-written over 1,000 songs for himself and others. With 180 million records sold, he is one of the best-selling artists of all time. Additionally, he appeared in more than 80 films. Furthermore, he released 51 studio albums in French, as well as 41 albums in other languages such as English, Italian, Spanish, and German. He also released 23 live albums.

In this article, you will find the complete discography of Charles Aznavour, including his French and international releases. It covers his earliest 78 RPM recordings made with Pierre Roche for the Polydor label, as well as his most recent CDs released on the EMI and Barclay Records labels.

Efforts are made to keep this article up to date, but the French version may have more recent information. Charles Aznavour's discography is constantly evolving with new releases, collaborations, and recordings. Regular updates are made, but it's advisable to check the French version for the latest information on his discography.

== French discography ==
=== Studio albums ===
Year	Album	Label	Notes
1953	Charles Aznavour chante... Charles Aznavour	Ducretet-Thomson	
1955	Charles Aznavour chante Charles Aznavour, vol. 2	Ducretet-Thomson	
1956	Charles Aznavour chante Charles Aznavour, vol. 3	Ducretet-Thomson	
1957	Bravos du music-hall à Charles Aznavour	Ducretet-Thomson	
1958	C'est ça	Ducretet-Thomson	
1960	Charles Aznavour (Les deux guitares)	Barclay	
1961	Charles Aznavour (Je m'voyais déjà)	Barclay	
1961	Charles Aznavour (Il faut savoir)	Barclay	
1962	Charles Aznavour accompagné par Burt Random et Paul Mauriat	Barclay	
1963	Qui ?	Barclay	
1963	La mamma	Barclay	
1964	Charles Aznavour, volume 1	Columbia	Columbia Re-recordings
1964	Charles Aznavour, volume 2	Columbia	Columbia Re-recordings
1964	Charles Aznavour, volume 3	Columbia	Columbia Re-recordings
1964	Charles Aznavour Accompagné Par Paul Mauriat Et Son Orchestre	Barclay	
1965	Aznavour 65	Barclay	
1966	Charles Aznavour (La bohème)	Barclay	
1966	De t'avoir aimée...	Barclay	
1967	Entre deux rêves	Barclay	
1968	J'aime Charles Aznavour, vol. 4	Columbia	Columbia Re-recordings
1969	Désormais...	Barclay	
1971	Non, je n'ai rien oublié	Barclay	
1972	Idiote je t'aime...	Barclay	
1973	Charles Aznavour raconte aux enfants... Le géant égoïste	Barclay	Reissued for the first time in CD in 2024 in the boxset The Complete Work.
1974	Visages de l'amour	Barclay	
1975	Hier... encore	Barclay	Re-recordings with orchestrations by Del Newman
1976	Voilà que tu reviens	Barclay	
1978	Je n'ai pas vu le temps passer...	Barclay	
1978	Un enfant est né...	Barclay	
1980	Autobiographie	Barclay	
1982	Je fais comme si...	Barclay	
1982	Une première danse/La légende de Stenka Razine	Barclay	Featuring Les Compagnons de la chanson on "La légende de Stenka Razine"
1983	Charles chante Aznavour et Dimey	Barclay	
1986	Aznavour (Embrasse-moi)	Tréma	
1987	Aznavour (Je bois)	Tréma	
1989	L'éveil, vol. 1	Tréma	Tréma Re-recordings
1989	L'élan, vol. 2	Tréma	Tréma Re-recordings
1989	L'envol, vol. 3	Tréma	Tréma Re-recordings
1991	Aznavour 92	Tréma	
1994	Toi et moi	Musarm	
1996	Pierre Roche / Charles Aznavour	EMI	Album featuring for the first time all the six 78 rpm recorded by Pierre Roche and Charles Aznavour between 1948 and 1950.
1997	Plus bleu...	EMI	Album including a virtual duet with Édith Piaf on "Plus bleu que tes yeux"
1998	Jazznavour	EMI	Album including two duets with Diane Reeves
2000	Aznavour 2000	EMI	
2003	Je voyage	EMI	Album including a duet with Katia Aznavour on "Je voyage"
2005	Insolitement vôtre	EMI	
2007	Colore ma vie	EMI	Album featuring some duets and collaborations
2008	Duos	EMI	2-CD Box Set, duets with Elton John, Julio Iglesias, Paul Anka, Sting, Celine Dion and Josh Groban.
2009	Charles Aznavour and The Clayton Hamilton Jazz Orchestra	EMI	Album including two new songs and three duets, recorded with Rachelle Ferrell and Diane Reeves
2011	Aznavour toujours	EMI	
2015	Encores	Barclay	

=== EPs ===
Year	Album	Label	Notes
1954	Charles Aznavour – 1 Moi j'fais mon rond – Viens au creux de mon épaule – Parce que – Ah!	Ducretet-Thomson	
1955	Charles Aznavour – 2 Je t'aime comme ça – À t'regarder – Ça – Toi	Ducretet-Thomson	
1955	Charles Aznavour – 3 Terre nouvelle – Le palais de nos chimères – Sur Ma Vie – Après l'amour	Ducretet-Thomson	
1956	Charles Aznavour – 4 Le chemin de l'éternité – Je cherche mon amour – Prends garde – Une enfant	Ducretet-Thomson	
1956	Charles Aznavour – 5 On ne sait jamais – J'entends ta voix – Vivre avec toi – J'aime Paris au mois de mai	Ducretet-Thomson	
1956	Interdit aux moins de 16 ans Après l'amour – Je veux te dire adieu – Prends garde – L'amour à fleur de coeur	Ducretet-Thomson	
1956	Charles Aznavour se souvient... de Roche et Aznavour; J'ai bu – Tant de monnaie – Le feutre taupé – Il pleut	Ducretet-Thomson	
1956	Édition spéciale Merci mon Dieu – L'amour a fait de moi – Sa jeunesse – Sur la table	Ducretet-Thomson	
1956	Charles Aznavour bavarde avec ses fans	Pathé Marconi Pyral	Presentation by Jean Nohain, 20 cm
1957	Ay! Mourir pour toi – Perdu – Pour faire une jam – Il y avait trois jeunes garçons	Ducretet-Thomson	
1957	Charles dans la ville La ville – Si je n'avais plus – C'est merveilleux l’amour	Ducretet-Thomson	
1958	À toi mon amour Quand tu viens chez moi, mon coeur – Mon amour – Ton beau visage – Je hais les dimanches	Ducretet-Thomson	
1958	Mon coeur à nu Je te donnerai – Ce sacré piano – Je ne peux pas rentrer chez moi – C'est ça	Ducretet-Thomson	
1958	Spécial 59; De ville en ville – Ma main a besoin de ta main – À tout jamais – Donne donne-moi	Ducretet-Thomson	
1959	Pourquoi viens-tu si tard? Pourquoi viens-tu si tard (Charles Aznavour) – Tu étais trop jolie (instrumental) – Francesca (instrumental) – Je m'voyais déjà (instrumental) – Pourquoi viens-tu si tard? (Virginie Reno) – Pourquoi viens-tu si tard? (instrumental)	Ducretet-Thomson	Soundtrack, Music by Charles Aznavour; Reissued for digital download in 2014, BNF Collection.
1959	Le cercle vicieux J'ai besoin de ton amour (instrumental) – Frieda (instrumental) – Attention Monsieur Dubois (instrumental) – Nadia (instrumental)	Pathé	Soundtrack, music by Charles Aznavour
1959	J'en déduis que je t'aime – Mon amour protège-moi – Gosse de Paris – Tant que l'on s'aimera	Ducretet-Thomson	Reissued in Canada on Muse/Capitol (also in French)
1959	La nuit des traqués Mon amour, protège-moi*	Ducretet-Thomson	Soundtrack, * by C. Aznavour
1960	Quand tu vas revenir – Dis-moi – Tu étais trop jolie – Liberté	Ducretet-Thomson	
1960	Tu t'laisses aller – J'ai perdu la tête – Plus heureux que moi – La nuit	Barclay	
1960	Les deux guitares – Ce jour tant attendu – Rendez-vous à Brasilia – Fraternité	Barclay	
1960	L'amour et la guerre – Prends le chorus – L'enfant prodigue – Monsieur est mort	Barclay	
1961	Je m'voyais déjà – Quand tu m'embrasses – Comme des étrangers – Tu vis ta vie mon coeur	Barclay	
1961	Il faut savoir – Avec ces yeux-là! – Le carillonneur – La marche des anges	Barclay	
1961	J'ai tort – Voilà que ça recommence – Esperanza – Lucie	Barclay	
1961	Noël des mages* – Douce nuit – Noël-Carillon – Dors, ma colombe (with the Chanteurs de Saint-Eustache)	Barclay	(* by C. Aznavour)
1962	Alléluia – Les petits matins – L'amour c'est comme un jour – Trousse-Chemise	Barclay	
1962	Les comédiens – Au rythme de mon coeur – Tu n'as plus – Notre amour nous resemble	Barclay	
1963	Je t'attends – Dors – Les deux pigeons – Ô! toi la vie	Barclay	
1963	Rentre chez toi et pleure – L'amour à fleur de coeur – Sa jeunesse... entre ses mains [2nd version] – Jézébel	Columbia/Pathé-Marconi	New recordings
1963	For me... formidable – Tu exagères – Bon anniversaire – Il viendra ce jour	Barclay	
1963	Trop tard – Au clair de mon âme – Donne tes seize ans – Qui?	Barclay	
1963	Sylvie – Les aventuriers – La mamma – Ne dis rien	Barclay	
1963	Et pourtant – Le temps des caresses – Si tu m'emportes – Tu veux	Barclay	
1964	J'aime Paris au mois de mai – Après l'amour – Parce que – Ce sacré piano	Columbia/Pathé-Marconi	New recordings
1964	Que c'est triste Venise – Hier encore – À ma fille – Quand j'en aurai assez	Barclay	
1964	Le temps – Tu t'amuses – Avec – Il te suffisait que je t'aime	Barclay	
1964	Week-end à Zuydcoote; Le monde est sous nos pas*	Barclay	Soundtrack, * by C. Aznavour/music by Maurice Jarre
1965	Le toréador – Que Dieu me garde – Reste – Les filles d'aujourd'hui	Barclay	
1965	Le monde est sous nos pas – Isabelle – Je te réchaufferai – C'est fini	Barclay	
1965	Monsieur Carnaval; La bohème – Aime-moi – Quelque chose ou quelqu'un – Ça vient quand on y pense	Barclay	
1965	La Bohème – Plus Rien – Et je vais	Barclay	
1965	Charles Aznavour vous parle du Palais d'hiver	J.B.P.	Interview by Jean Serge
1965	Le crocodile majuscule	Barclay	Soundtrack, story by Marielle Sohier, spoken by Charles Aznavour; Reissued for the first time in CD in 2024 in the boxset The Complete Work.
1966	Charles Aznavour chante Paris au mois d'août Paris au mois d'août – Sur le chemin du retour – Il fallait bien – Parce que tu crois	Barclay	
1966	Je l'aimerai toujours – Plus rien – Et moi dans mon coin – Je reviendrai de loin	Barclay	
1966	Les enfants de la guerre – Pour essayer de faire une chanson – Ma mie – De t'avoir aimée	Barclay	
1966	Tu ne tueras point L'amour et la guerre (1st part) – L'amour et la guerre (2nd part) – L'amour et la guerre (3rd part) – L'amour et la guerre (instrumental)	Barclay	Soundtrack
1966	Le comité français pour la campagne mondiale contre la faim Noël des mages (with the Chanteurs de Saint-Eustache)	Barclay	Compilation
1967	Il te faudra bien revenir – Entre nous – Je reviens Fanny – Les bons moments	Barclay	
1967	Yerushalaïm – Un jour – Éteins la lumière – Tu étais toi	Barclay	
1968	Caroline – J'aimerai – Emmenez-moi – Au voleur!	Barclay	
1968	Le cabotin – Comme une maladie – Tout s'en va	Barclay	
1969	La lumière – Désormais – Je n'oublierai jamais – L'amour	Barclay	
1969	Si j'avais un piano – Ma main a besoin de ta main – Le palais de nos chimères – Je te donnerai	Columbia/Pathé-Marconi	New recordings
1969	Quand et puis pourquoi – S'il y avait une autre toi – Marie l'orpheline – Comme l'eau, le feu, le vent	Barclay	
1969	Non identifié – Les faux – Alors je dérive – Y'a vraiment pas de quoi (en faire une chanson)	Barclay	
1970	Les jours heureux – Le temps des loups – Avec toi	Barclay	

=== Singles ===
Years	Album	Label	Notes
1948	Voyez, c'est le printemps – J'ai bu	Polydor	Roche et Aznavour, 78 rpm
1948	Départ-express – Le feutre taupé	Polydor	Roche et Aznavour, 78 rpm
1948	Tant de monnaie – Je n'ai qu'un sou	Polydor	Roche et Aznavour, 78 rpm
1948	Je suis amoureux – Boule de gomme	Polydor	Roche et Aznavour, 78 rpm
1949	Les cris de ma ville – Retour	London/Canada	Roche et Aznavour, 78 rpm; Reissued in 1950, Polydor.
1949	En revenant de Québec – Il pleut	London/Canada	Roche et Aznavour, 78 rpm; Reissued in 1950, Polydor.
1952	Jézébel – Poker	Ducretet-Thomson Selmer	78 tours
1952	Plus bleu que tes yeux – Oublie Loulou	Ducretet-Thomson Selmer	78 tours
1952	Quand elle chante – Si j'avais un piano	Ducretet-Thomson Selmer	78 tours
1953	Mé-ké – Viens	Ducretet-Thomson Selmer	78 tours
1953	Et bâiller et dormir – Intoxiqué	Ducretet-Thomson Selmer	78 tours
1953	À propos de pommier – Couchés dans le foin	Ducretet-Thomson Selmer	78 tours
1954	Heureux avec des riens – Quelque part dans la nuit	Ducretet-Thomson	78 tours
1954	Monsieur Jonas – Les chercheurs d'or	Ducretet-Thomson	78 tours
1954	Monsieur Jonas – Ah!	Ducretet-Thomson	78 tours, réédition avec face B différente
1954	Moi j'fais mon rond – Parce que	Ducretet-Thomson	78 tours
1954	Les chercheurs d'or – L'émigrant	Ducretet-Thomson	78 tours
1954	Je veux te dire adieu – Viens aux creux de mon épaule	Ducretet-Thomson	78 tours
1954	Je t'aime comme ça – À t'regarder	Ducretet-Thomson	78 tours
1954	La bagare!... – Je voudrais	Ducretet-Thomson	78 tours
1954	Poker – Monsieur Jonas	Ducretet-Thomson	
1955	Sur ma vie – Le palais de nos chimères	Ducretet-Thomson	78 tours
1955	Je t'aime comme ça (extrait) – À t'regarder (extrait) – Toi (extrait)	Ducretet-Thomson	78 tours 15 cm (promo)
1955	Prends garde – Je cherche mon amour	Ducretet-Thomson	78 tours
1955	Je t'aime comme ça – À t'regarder	Ducretet-Thomson	
1955	Toi – Ça	Ducretet-Thomson	
1955	La bagarre – Je voudrais	Ducretet-Thomson	
1955	Viens au creux de mon épaule – Parce que	Ducretet-Thomson	
1955	Terre nouvelle – Le palais de nos chimères	Ducretet-Thomson	
1955	Après l'amour – Sur ma vie	Ducretet-Thomson	
1955	Rentre chez toi et pleure – Je cherche mon amour	Ducretet-Thomson	
1955	Le chemin de l'éternité – Je cherche mon amour	Ducretet-Thomson	
1955	Prends garde – Une enfant	Ducretet-Thomson	
1956	Sa jeunesse... entre ses mains – L'amour a fait de moi	Ducretet-Thomson	
1956	On ne sait jamais – J'entends ta voix	Ducretet-Thomson	
1956	Vivre avec toi – J'aime Paris au mois de mai	Ducretet-Thomson	
1957	Merci mon coeur – L'amour à fleur de coeur	Ducretet-Thomson	
1957	Charles Aznavour chante pour vous Ay! Mourir pour toi – Pour faire une jam	Ducretet-Thomson	
1957	Sur la table – Bal du faubourg	Ducretet-Thomson	
1957	À t'regarder – Bal du faubourg	Ducretet-Thomson	
1958	Si je n'avais plus – C'est merveilleux l’amour	Ducretet-Thomson	
1958	La ville – Ton beau visage	Ducretet-Thomson	
1958	Ce sacré piano – Je te donnerai	Ducretet-Thomson	
1958	Je ne peux pas rentrer chez moi – C'est ça	Ducretet-Thomson	
1958	De ville en ville – Donne, donne-moi mon coeur	Ducretet-Thomson	
1958	Ma main a besoin de ta main – À tout jamais	Ducretet-Thomson	
1959	Couchés dans le foin [2nd version] – Je hais les dimanches	Ducretet-Thomson	
1959	Mon amour protège-moi – Pourquoi viens-tu si tard?	Ducretet-Thomson	
1959	Quand tu viens chez moi mon coeur – Il y avait trois jeunes garçons	Ducretet-Thomson	
1959	Mon amour protège-moi – J'en déduis que je t'aime	Ducretet-Thomson	
1959	Délit de fuite Tant que l'on s'aimera – Gosse de Paris	Ducretet-Thomson	
1960	Dis-moi – Tu étais trop jolie	Ducretet-Thomson	
1960	Liberté – Quand tu vas revenir	Ducretet-Thomson	
1960	Tu t'laisses aller – J'ai perdu la tête	Barclay	Juke-box/promo
1960	Les deux guitares – Ce jour tant attendu	Barclay	Juke-box/promo
1960	Rendez-vous à Brasilia – Plus heureux que moi	Barclay	Juke-box/promo
1960	J'ai des milliers de rien du tout – Ce n'est pas nécessairement ça	Barclay	Juke-box/promo
1960	L'amour et la guerre – L'enfant prodigue	Barclay	Juke-box/promo
1960	Première de Charles Aznavour à l'Alhambra; Je m'voyais déjà – L'enfant prodigue (instrumental)	Barclay	Special edition "12 décembre 1960"; Reissued on a collector's 45 RPM in 2024, included in the box set "The Complete Work" when ordered through the official store, Barclay.
1961	Je m'voyais déjà – Quand tu m'embrasses	Barclay	Juke-box/promo
1961	Comme des étrangers – Tu vis ta vie mon coeur	Barclay	Juke-box/promo
1961	La marche des anges – Il faut savoir	Barclay	Juke-box/promo
1961	Le carillonneur – Avec ces yeux-là	Barclay	Juke-box/promo
1961	Monsieur est mort – Prends le chorus	Barclay	Juke-box/promo
1961	J'ai tort – Lucie	Barclay	Juke-box/promo
1961	Voilà que ça recommence – Ne crois surtout pas	Barclay	Juke-box/promo
1961	Noël des mages (with the Chanteurs de Saint-Eustache)	Sonorama	Juke-box/promo
1962	Esperanza – Au rythme de mon coeur	Barclay	Juke-box/promo
1962	Alléluia – Trousse-Chemise	Barclay	Juke-box/promo
1962	Les petits matins – L'amour c'est comme un jour	Barclay	Juke-box/promo
1962	Tu n'as plus – Les comédiens	Barclay	Juke-box/promo
1963	Jézébel – L'amour à fleur de coeur	Columbia/Pathé-Marconi	New recordings
1963	Rentre chez toi et pleure – Sa jeunesse... entre ses mains	Columbia/Pathé-Marconi	New recordings
1963	Trop tard – Les deux pigeons	Barclay	Juke-box/promo
1963	Donne tes seize ans – For me... formidable	Barclay	Juke-box/promo
1963	Qui – Je t'attends	Barclay	Juke-box/promo
1963	Tu exagères – Au clair de mon âme	Barclay	Juke-box/promo
1963	Bon anniversaire – Il viendra ce jour	Barclay	Juke-box/promo
1963	Sylvie – Les aventuriers	Barclay	Juke-box/promo
1963	La mamma – Ne dis rien	Barclay	Juke-box/promo
1963	Et pourtant – Tu veux	Barclay	Juke-box/promo
1963	Le temps des caresses – Si tu m'emportes	Barclay	Juke-box/promo
1964	J'en déduis que je t'aime – J'aime Paris au mois de mai	Columbia/Pathé-Marconi	New recordings
1964	On ne sait jamais – Ce sacré piano	Columbia/Pathé-Marconi	New recordings
1964	Que c'est triste Venise – Hier encore	Barclay	Juke-box/promo
1964	À ma fille – Quand j'en aurai assez	Barclay	Juke-box/promo
1964	Le temps – Tu t'amuses	Barclay	Juke-box/promo
1964	Il te suffisait que je t'aime – Avec	Barclay	Juke-box/promo
1965	Le monde est sous nos pas* – Je te réchaufferai	Barclay	Juke-box/promo, * from the movie "Week-end à Zuydcoote"
1965	Le toréador – C'est fini	Barclay	Juke-box/promo
1965	Les filles d'aujourd'hui – Reste	Barclay	Juke-box/promo
1965	Isabelle – Que Dieu me garde	Barclay	Juke-box/promo
1965	La bohème	Barclay	Promo one-side
1966	La bohème – Quelque chose ou quelqu'un	Barclay	Juke-box/promo
1966	La bohème – Plus rien	Barclay	Juke-box/promo
1966	Il fallait bien – Paris au mois d'août	Barclay	Juke-box/promo
1966	Aime-moi – Sarah	Barclay	Juke-box/promo
1966	Et moi dans mon coin – Plus rien	Barclay	Juke-box/promo
1966	Je l'aimerai toujours – Je reviens de loin	Barclay	Juke-box/promo
1966	Les enfants de la guerre – Pour essayer de faire une chanson	Barclay	Juke-box/promo
1966	Ma mie – De t'avoir aimée	Barclay	Juke-box/promo
1966	Venezia (by Ricardo) – Quelques mots de Charles Aznavour	Riviera	
1967	Les bons moments – Je l'aimerai toujours	Barclay	Juke-box/promo
1967	Il te faudra bien revenir – Je reviens Fanny	Barclay	Juke-box/promo
1967	Yerushalaim (Single version) – Éteins la lumière	Barclay	Juke-box/promo
1968	Emmenez-moi – Emmenez-moi	Barclay	Promo
1968	Emmenez-moi – Caroline	Barclay	Juke-box/promo
1968	Le cabotin – Comme une maladie	Barclay	Juke-box/promo
1968	Au nom de la jeunesse – On a toujours le temps	Barclay	Juke-box/promo
1969	La lumière – Désormais	Barclay	
1969	Quand et puis pourquoi – Marie l'orpheline	Barclay	Promo "Le Discotruc parade"
1970	Le temps des loups – Avec toi	Barclay	
1971	À t'regarder – Je t'aime comme ça	Columbia	Promo, 1964 versions
1971	Non, je n'ai rien oublié – Mourir d'aimer	Barclay	
1971	Mourir d'aimer – Mourir d'aimer	Barclay	Promo
1972	Le temps des loups	Barclay	Promo one-side
1972	Isabelle – L'amour c'est comme un jour	Barclay	New edition, previously released material
1972	Me voilà seul – Les plaisirs démodés	Barclay	
1972	Comme ils disent – Idiote je t'aime	Barclay	
1972	Comme ils disent – On se réveillera	Barclay	
1973	Les deux guitares – Tu t'laisses aller	Barclay	New edition, previously released material
1973	Je m'voyais déjà – Trousse-Chemise	Barclay	New edition, previously released material
1973	Il faut savoir – Les comédiens	Barclay	New edition, previously released material
1973	Hier encore – For me... formidable	Barclay	New edition, previously released material
1973	La mamma – Qui?	Barclay	New edition, previously released material
1973	Que c'est triste Venise – Et pourtant	Barclay	New edition, previously released material
1973	La bohème – Paris au mois d'août	Barclay	New edition, previously released material
1973	Le cabotin – Les enfants de la guerre	Barclay	New edition, previously released material
1973	Désormais – Quand et puis pourquoi	Barclay	New edition, previously released material
1973	Emmenez-moi – Et moi dans mon coin	Barclay	New edition, previously released material
1973	Nous irons à Vérone – Un jour ou l'autre	Barclay	
1973	On n'a plus quinze ans – Mon amour on se retrouvera	Barclay	
1974	La baraka – Je meurs de toi	Barclay	
1974	Un enfant de toi pour Noël – Hosanna	Barclay	
1975	Ils sont tombés – Tes yeux mes yeux	Barclay	
1975	Tous les visages de l'amour – De t'avoir aimée	Barclay	
1976	Merci Madame la vie – Merci Madame la vie	Barclay	Promo
1976	Slowly – Par gourmandise	Barclay	Spécial club
1976	Mes emmerdes – Mais c'était hier	Barclay	
1976	Voilà que tu reviens – Par gourmandise	Barclay	
1976	Marie quand tu t'en vas – Mes emmerdes	Barclay	Promo offer "Total", Belgium
1977	Camarade – Je ne connais que toi (You)	Barclay	
1977	J'ai vu Paris – Ne t'en fais pas	Barclay	
1977	Avant la guerre – La chanson du faubourg	Barclay	
1978	Dieu – Retiens la nuit	Barclay	
1978	Ave Maria – Ave Maria	Barclay	Promo
1978	Avec Maria – Ave Maria (instrumental)	Barclay	
1979	Être – Rien de moins que t'aimer	Barclay	
1980	Il faut savoir	Barclay	Réédition, matériel déjà paru
1980	Ça passe – Allez vaï Marseille	Barclay	
1980	Ça passe – L'amour, bon Dieu l'amour	Barclay	
1980	Ça passe – L'amour, bon Dieu l'amour	Barclay	45 t Maxi 30 cm
1981	Téhéran 43; Une vie d'amour – Vetchnai lioubov	Barclay	
1981	Une vie d'amour* – Téhéran 43 (Ouverture)	Barclay	(* with Mireille Mathieu)
1981	Je fais comme si – Retiens la nuit	Barclay	
1982	Une première danse – Un million de fois	Barclay	
1982	Une première danse – Comme nous	Barclay	
1982	La légende de Stenka Razine (with the Compagnons de la chanson) – Ce n'est pas un adieu	Barclay	
1983	La salle et la terasse – La mer à boire	Barclay	
1983	Trèfle à quatre feuilles – Papa Calypso	Barclay	
1986	Embrasse-moi – Les émigrants	Tréma	
1986	Paris je t'aime Charles Aznavour sings : J'aime Paris au mois de mai	OPE/Pathé-Marconi	Compilation, Promo offer for "Paris" by Yves Saint-Laurent
1987	Toi contre moi – Je me raccroche à toi	Tréma	
1987	Je bois – Les bateaux sont partis	Tréma	
1988	Te dire adieu – Quand tu dors près de moi	Tréma	
1989	Pour toi Arménie – Ils sont tombés*	Tréma	* Spoken by Robert Hossein and Rosy Varte
1989	Viens au creux de mon épaule – Sa jeunesse	Tréma	New recordings
2014	Le feutre taupé – Départ Express	Polydor	78 tours by Roche et Aznavour, limited edition "90e anniversary"

=== Compilation albums ===
Year	Album	Label	Notes
1957	8 chansons de Charles Aznavour	Ducretet-Thomson	16 tours 17 cm
1960	Les meilleures chansons de Charles Aznavour	Ducretet-Thomson	
1966	Charles Aznavour chante en multiphonie stéréo, album n° 1	Barclay	New stereo versions of the songs, including some new voice tracks.
1966	Charles Aznavour chante en multiphonie stéréo, album n° 2	Barclay	New stereo versions of the songs, including some new voice tracks.
1966	Aznavour – La mamma	Barclay	
1966	Aznavour – Il faut savoir	Barclay	
1966	Vedettes	Barclay	
1967	Charles Aznavour chante en multiphonie stéréo, album n° 3	Barclay	New stereo versions of the songs, including some new voice tracks.
1967	Il faut savoir	Barclay	
1967	Charles Aznavour	Barclay	3 LP Boxset
1968	Les prénoms	Barclay	Includes a new stereo version or Isabelle with a new voice track.
1970	Charles Aznavour chante ses vingt ans	Columbia	
1970	Des vedettes aux idoles – 3	Ducretet-Thomson	
1971	Premiers succès	EMI	
1971	N° 2	EMI	
1972	Disque d'or	Ducretet-Thomson	
1972	Douze succès d'Aznavour	Barclay	Include a new recording of L'amour c'est comme un jour and some stereo versions originally released in 1966–67
1973	Je m'voyais déjà	Columbia	
1974	Premiers succès	MFP/EMI	
1974	Les grands succès	Barclay	
1974	Je t'aime comme ça	EMI/Pathé Marconi	
1975	Charles Aznavour	Ducretet-Thomson	2 LP
1976	Je m'voyais déjà, vol. 1	Barclay	
1976	La mamma, vol. 2	Barclay	
1976	Il faut savoir, vol. 3	Barclay	
1976	Qui, vol. 4	Barclay	
1976	Le temps, vol. 5	Barclay	
1976	Reste, vol. 6	Barclay	
1976	La bohème, vol. 7	Barclay	
1976	Emmenez-moi, vol. 8	Barclay	
1976	Désormais, vol. 9	Barclay	
1976	Non, je n'ai rien oublié, vol. 10	Barclay	
1976	Comme ils disent, vol. 11	Barclay	
1976	Visages de l'amour, vol. 12	Barclay	
1977	Sur ma vie	Pathé Marconi	C3 LP Boxset (36 tracks from 1951 to 1960)
1977	Charles Aznavour	MFP	
1978	Paris au mois d'août	Barclay	
1978	Aznavour formidable	Barclay	
1978	Le disque d'or, vol. 1	Barclay	
1979	Le disque d'or, vol. 2	Barclay	
1979	Collection « Espaces »	Thomson-Ducretet	
1979	Je ne peux pas rentrer chez moi – Sur ma vie – C'est merveilleux l'amour	EMI	3 LP Boxset
1980	Disque d'or	Thomson-Ducretet	"Disque d'or 30 carats" collection
1980	Charles Aznavour	Thomson-Ducretet	
1980	Enregistrements originaux	EMI MFP-Music Melody	2 LP
1983	Amour... Toujours...	Barclay	Includes two new re-recordings and one stereo version originally released in 1966–67
1984	Enregistrements originaux	EMI	
1985	La mamma	Tréma	Include some stereo versions originally released in 1966–67
1985	Il faut savoir	Tréma	Include some stereo versions originally released in 1966–67
1986	La bohème	Tréma	Include some stereo versions originally released in 1966–67
1986	Tu t'laisses aller	Tréma	Include some stereo versions originally released in 1966–67
1986	Les petits matins	Tréma	Include some stereo versions originally released in 1966–67
1986	Le temps des loups	Tréma	Include some stereo versions originally released in 1966–67
1987	20 chansons d'or	Tréma	
1987	Les grandes chansons (volume 1)	Musarm	
1987	Les grandes chansons (volume 2)	Musarm	
1987	Palais des congrès 1987 (excerpts)	Musarm	
1989	Sur ma vie	EMI/Thomson-Ducretet	2 CD
1990	Préférences	EMI	
1991	Disque d'or	EMI	
1992	108 grands succès	Musarm	6 CD
1992	Coffret EMI	EMI	
1992	Jézébel	EMI	
1992	Sur ma vie	EMI	
1992	Pour faire une jam	EMI	
1992	Liberté	EMI	
1992	J'aime Paris au mois de mai	EMI	
1994	40 chansons d'or	EMI	Including Barclay and Trema versions.
1996	L'Authentique - Colonne Morris	EMI	30-CD Box Set
1996	40 chansons d'or (EMI)	EMI	New edition including Columbia versions and a different listing.
1996	Charles Aznavour chante Noël	EMI	Christmas Compilation
1998	Mes amours	EMI	
1998	Aznavour live à l'Olympia	EMI	6 CD DeLuxe Box Set; Reissued in 2003 for digital download.
1998	L'Authentique	EMI	New presentation of the 30-CD Box Set
2000	L'Essentiel	EMI	
2001	D'un siècle à l'autre	EMI	Longbox 3 CD
2004	Aznavour – Indispensables	EMI	4 CD + DVD
2004	Charles Aznavour – Platinum Collection	EMI	2 CD
2004	Intégrale Charles Aznavour – Arc de triomphe	EMI	52-CD Box Set, including the live albums
2004	Jezebel	EMI	
2006	Hier encore : Best of studio et live à l'Olympia	EMI	2 CD
2013	Les 50 + Belles Chansons	Barclay	3 CD
2013	Les 100 + Belles Chansons	Barclay	5 CD
2014	90e anniversaire: Best of Charles Aznavour	Barclay	4 CD; Reissued partially in 2016 as two vinyls, Barclay.
2014	Discographie Studio Originale, Vol. 1 : 1948-49	Barclay	New high-resolution re-mastering of 78 rpm records.
2014	Discographie Studio Originale, Vol. 2 : 1951-54	Barclay	
2014	Discographie Studio Originale, Vol. 3 : 1954-56	Barclay	
2014	Discographie Studio Originale, Vol. 4 : 1956-57	Barclay	
2014	Discographie Studio Originale, Vol. 5 : 1958-60	Barclay	
2014	Discographie Studio Originale, Vol. 6 : 1960-61	Barclay	
2014	Discographie Studio Originale, Vol. 7 : 1962-63	Barclay	
2014	Discographie Studio Originale, Vol. 8 : 1963-64	Barclay	
2014	Discographie Studio Originale, Vol. 9 : 1964	Barclay	
2014	Discographie Studio Originale, Vol. 10 : 1964 & 1968	Barclay	
2014	Discographie Studio Originale, Vol. 11 : 1965-66	Barclay	
2014	Discographie Studio Originale, Vol. 12 : 1966-67	Barclay	
2014	Discographie Studio Originale, Vol. 13 : 1968-70	Barclay	
2014	Discographie Studio Originale, Vol. 14 : 1971-73	Barclay	
2014	Discographie Studio Originale, Vol. 15 : 1974-76	Barclay	
2014	Discographie Studio Originale, Vol. 16 : 1975	Barclay	
2014	Discographie Studio Originale, Vol. 17 : 1978-79	Barclay	
2014	Discographie Studio Originale, Vol. 18 : 1980-82	Barclay	
2014	Discographie Studio Originale, Vol. 19 : 1982-83	Barclay	
2014	Discographie Studio Originale, Vol. 20 : 1986-87	Barclay	
2014	Discographie Studio Originale, Vol. 21 : 1989	Barclay	First reissue of the 1989 Tréma re-recordings
2014	Discographie Studio Originale, Vol. 22 : 1989	Barclay	First reissue of the 1989 Tréma re-recordings
2014	Discographie Studio Originale, Vol. 23 : 1991	Barclay	
2014	Discographie Studio Originale, Vol. 24 : 1994	Barclay	
2014	Discographie Studio Originale, Vol. 25 : 1997	Barclay	
2014	Discographie Studio Originale, Vol. 26 : 1998	Barclay	
2014	Discographie Studio Originale, Vol. 27 : 2000	Barclay	
2014	Discographie Studio Originale, Vol. 28 : 2003	Barclay	
2014	Discographie Studio Originale, Vol.29: 2005	Barclay	
2014	Discographie Studio Originale, Vol.30: 2007	Barclay	
2014	Discographie Studio Originale, Vol.31: 2009	Barclay	
2014	Discographie Studio Originale, Vol.32: 2011	Barclay	
2014	Aznavour – Anthologie	Barclay	60 CD Anthology, more than 760 newly remastered titles from the original analogue masters; Includes several songs (1964-1965) previously unreleased on CD in stereo.
2015	Hit Box : Charles Aznavour	Barclay	
2015	La collection officielle Charles Aznavour - Une vie en chansons - 50 albums de légende	Polygram Collections/Barclay (France)	Collection of 50 CD offered separately in newspaper stands and by mail, includes original booklets and rare songs released in the Anthologie boxset of 2014.
2015	Rarities	Barclay	Compilation of unreleased and rare versions previously released in the 2014 Anthologie + two 1983 rare tracks.
2016	Best of Charles Aznavour (1948-1962)	Barclay	
2017	Charles Aznavour – Collected	3 CD, Universal Music/Netherlands	Reissued partially in 2017 as 3-LP "French Flag" colored vinyls, Music on Vinyl/Europe
2018	Ses plus belles chansons	Barclay	Vinyl
2018	Les Années Barclay (1960-1983)	20 CD, Barclay	27 original albums in French + 2 original albums in English + 2 original albums in Italian + 2 original albums in Spanish + 2 original albums in German + 2 rare live (Live à Hollywood 1965 and Live au Japon – Tokyo 1971)
2019	Le double best of	2 LPs, Barclay	
2019	L'album de sa vie – 100 titres	5 CDs, Barclay	
2019	L'album de sa vie – 50 titres	3 CDs, Barclay	
2024	100 ans, 100 chansons – Centenary Edition	5 CDs, Barclay	
2024	100 ans, 100 duos – Centenary Edition	5 CDs, Barclay	
2024	The Complete Work – Centenary Edition	100 CDs, Barclay	33 CDs sung in French + 4 CDs with his duets + 1 CD Aznavour tells stories to children + 1 CD with alternative versions + 1 CD with lesser-known stereo versions + 1 CD with original instrumentals for singing Aznavour + 10 CDs sung in English + 8 CDs sung in Italian + 5 CDs sung in Spanish + 3 CDs sung in German + 33 concert CDs

== English discography ==
=== Studio albums ===
Year	Album	Label	Notes
1958	Believe in Me !	Ducretet-Thomson	Reissued in 2024 in the boxset The Complete Work, Barclay.
1962	The Time is Now	Mercury	Also issued in 1962, Mercury, Stereo; Reissued in 1963, Pour vous mesdames (London Globe Records/DECCA/UK, GLB 1003, Mono), the song "I Know I'm Wrong" replaces "Les comédiens" + new recording of "Sarah"; Reissued for digital download in 2015 "The Time is Now", Stage Door, Mono; Reissued in 2024 in the boxset The Complete Work, Barclay.
1965	His Love Songs in English	Reprise	Also issued in 1965, Reprise, Stereo; Reissued in 2024 in the boxset The Complete Work, Barclay.
1966	His Kind of Love Songs	Reprise	Also issued in 1967, Reprise, Stereo; Reissued in 2024 in the boxset The Complete Work, Barclay.
1969	Of Flesh and Soul – Charles Aznavour Sings in English	Monument	Also issued in 1969, Aznavour sings Aznavour (Barclay/France), the song "Yesterday When I Was Young" replaces "A Blue Like the Blue of Your Eyes"; Reissued in 2024 in the boxset The Complete Work, Barclay.
1970	A Man's Life: Charles Aznavour	Monument	Reissued in 1971, Aznavour sings Aznavour Vol. 2 (Barclay/France), the song "A Blue Like the Blue of Your Eyes" replaces "Yesterday When I Was Young"; Reissued in 2024 in the boxset The Complete Work, Barclay.
1972	I Have Lived	MGM Records	Also issued in 1972, Aznavour Sings Aznavour Vol. 3 (Barclay/France & UK), the short version of "The Old Fashioned Ways" replace the long version featured on the American album; Reissued in 1975, The Old Fashioned Way (Barclay/France); Reissued in 2024 in the boxset The Complete Work, Barclay.
1974	A Tapestry of Dreams	Barclay	Reissued in 2024 in the boxset The Complete Work, Barclay.
1974	I Sing For... You	Barclay	Reissued in 2024 in the boxset The Complete Work, Barclay.
1978	We Were Happy Then	MAM Records	Also issued in 1978 Esquire (EMI/UK); Reissued in 2024 in the boxset The Complete Work, Barclay.
1978	A Private Christmas	MAM Records	Reissued in 1981 My Christmas Album (UK) (with a new recorded version of "She"); Reissued in 2024 in the boxset The Complete Work, Barclay.
1983	Aznavour '83	Barclay	Also issued in 1983, In Times To Be (Barclay/UK); Also issued in 1983, I'll Be There (Barclay/France); Reissued in 2024 in the boxset The Complete Work, Barclay.
1995	You and Me	EMI	Reissued in 2024 in the boxset The Complete Work, Barclay.
2024	I Will Warm Your Heart	Universal Music	Posthumous album; Released for the first time in 2024 in the boxset The Complete Work, Barclay; Also available for digital download, Barclay.

=== EPs ===
Years	Album	Label	Notes
1956	Aznavour invades Believe in me – I look at you – I'm gonna sleep with one eye open – Me-ké	Ducretet-Thomson	Reissued in 2024 in the boxset The Complete Work, Barclay.
1966	Aznavour in London; You've let yourself go – The boss is dead – You've got to learn – Like strangers	Decca	Reissued in 2024 in the boxset The Complete Work, Barclay.

=== Singles ===
Year	Album	Label	Certifications	Notes
1962	You've let yourself go – You've got to learn	Mercury		
1965	Who (will take my place) – Let me be your first love	Reprise		Reissued in 2024 in the boxset The Complete Work, Barclay.
1965	Venice blue – I will warm your heart	Reprise/UK		
1965	There is a time – Don't say a word	Reprise/UK		
1967	After loving you – Après l'amour [in english]	Reprise		
1969	Yerushalaïm [in english] – Green years	Reprise		Reissued in 2024 in the boxset The Complete Work, Barclay.
1969	All Those Pretty Girls – My Hand Needs Your Hand	Monument		
1969	To My Daughter – You've Let Yourself Go	Monument		
1970	Yesterday when I was young – All those pretty girls	Barclay		
1972	To die of love (single version) – For me... formidable (1972 version)	Barclay		Reissued in 2024 in the boxset The Complete Work, Barclay.
1973	The old fashioned way – What makes a man	Barclay		Reissued in 2024 in the boxset The Complete Work, Barclay.
1974	She	Barclay	BPI: Silver	
1974	She* – La baraka [in english]	Barclay		(* Theme from the TV series "Seven faces of woman")
1974	The "I love you" song – Ciao always ciao	Barclay		
1974	We Can Never Know – You've Got To Learn	Barclay		
1975	You – Women of today	Barclay		
1975	Take me away – Ciao always ciao	Barclay		
1978	I Will Warm Your Heart – The Happy Days	MAM		

=== Compilations ===
Year	Album	Label	Notes
1969	The Aznavour Way	Monument	
1971	Let's Love	Harmony	
1976	The Best of Charles Aznavour	Barclay	Reissued in 1976, Barclay.
1982	The Charles Aznavour Collection Vol. 1	Barclay	
1982	The Charles Aznavour Collection Vol. 2	Barclay	
1988	Aznavour – The Collection Vol. 1	Arcade	Reissued in 1991, Musarm.
1988	Aznavour – The Collection Vol. 2	Arcade	Reissued in 1991, Musarm.
1990	Aznavour (The Old Fashionned Way)	Musarm	Reissued in 1995, EMI
1990	Aznavour (She)	Musarm	Reissued in 1995, EMI
1990	Aznavour (Yesterday When I Was Young)	Musarm	Reissued in 1995, EMI
1993	Like Roses	Rondo	
1995	Greatest Hits	Replay	
1995	The Best Of Charles Aznavour – 20 Great Songs in English	EMI	
1995	Greatest Golden Hits	EMI	
1996	She – The Best of Charles Aznavour	EMI	
2001	Forever	Smart Art	
2001	Het Beste Van Charles Aznavour	EMI	French & English Compilation, Holland
2002	Aznavour – The Very Best Of	EMI	
2003	Het Beste Van Charles Aznavour volume 2	EMI	French & English Compilation, Holland
2010	Het Allerbeste Van Charles Aznavour	EMI	2 CD French & English Compilation, Holland
2014	Sings In English: Greatest Hits	Universal	
2016	Collected: 64 tracks-3CD	Universal	French & English Compilation, Holland

== Spanish discography ==
=== Studio albums ===
Year	Album	Label	Notes
1965	Canta en español	Barclay	Reissued in 2024 in the boxset The Complete Work, Barclay.
1965	Canta en español, vol. 2	Barclay	Reissued in 2024 in the boxset The Complete Work, Barclay.
1969	Canta en español	Barclay	Reissued in 2024 in the boxset The Complete Work, Barclay.
1978	Al dormir junto a ti	Barclay	Reissued in 1980 under the name Camarada (USA); Reissued in 2024 in the boxset The Complete Work, Barclay.
1981	Dios	Barclay	Reissued in 2024 in the boxset The Complete Work, Barclay.
1996	Cuando estás junto a mí	EMI	Reissued in 2024 in the boxset The Complete Work, Barclay.
2008	Tú pintas mi vida	EMI	Album including a duet with Shaila Dúrcal on "Viajar y viajar"; Reissued in 2024 in the boxset The Complete Work, Barclay.
2024	El disco de Navidad	Universal Music	Unreleased album Recorded in 1996; Released for the first time in 2024 in the boxset The Complete Work, Barclay.

=== EPs ===
Years	Album	Label	Notes
1958	Juventud, divino tesoro – Vivir junto a ti – Esto es formidable – Mi última hora	Ducretet-Thomson	Reissued in 2024 in the boxset The Complete Work, Barclay.
1965	Formi, formidable – La mamma [in Spanish] – Debes saber – Te espero	Barclay	
1965	Venecia sin ti – Cuando no pueda más – Si vienes a mí	Barclay	
1965	Y por tanto – Sarah – Por querer – No sabré jamás	Barclay	
1965	Si tú me llevas – Isabel – Oh, tu vida – Amo París en el mes de mayo	Barclay	
1966	Juventud, divino tesoro – Vivir junto a ti – Mi última hora	Hispanovox/Ducretet-Thomson	New recordings; Reissued in 2024 in the boxset The Complete Work, Barclay.
1966	Yo te daré calor – C'est fini – Buen aniversario – Quédate	Barclay	
1966	Quién – Tus dieciséis años – Con – Era demasiado bonita	Barclay	
1968	Apaga la luz – Los verdes años – Lo que fue ya pasó – Un día	Sonoplay/Barclay	
1968	La mamma [in Spanish]– Venecia sin ti – La bohemia – Debes saber	Sonoplay/Barclay	

=== Singles ===
Year	Album	Label	Notes
1969	Apaga La Luz – Su Juventud	Monument	
1970	Nunca más – Cuando y por qué	Barclay/MoviePlay	Reissued in 2024 in the boxset The Complete Work, Barclay.
1971	Es la juventud – Venecia sin ti	Barclay/MoviePlay	
1971	Morir de amor	Barclay/MoviePlay	
1971	Ayer aún – All those pretty girls	Barclay/MoviePlay	Reissued in 2024 in the boxset The Complete Work, Barclay.
1972	Morir de amor – Entre	Barclay/MoviePlay	Reissued in 2024 in the boxset The Complete Work, Barclay.
1972	Placeres antiguos [1st version] – Que solo estoy	Barclay/MoviePlay	Reissued in 2024 in the boxset The Complete Work, Barclay.
1972	Viví – Trousse-Chemise [in spanish]	Barclay/MoviePlay	Reissued in 2024 in the boxset The Complete Work, Barclay.
1973	Canta en español La mamma – La bohemia	Barclay/MoviePlay	
1973	Iremos a Verona – Placeres antiguos [2nd version]	Barclay/MoviePlay	
1981	Dios – Pero fue ayer	Barclay/MoviePlay	
1982	Venecia sin ti – La bohemia [in spanish]	Barclay/MoviePlay	
1982	Con – Venecia sin ti	Barclay/MoviePlay	
1982	Quién – Tus 16 años	Barclay/MoviePlay	
1982	Venecia sin ti – La mamma [in spanish]	ORO	

=== Compilations ===
Year	Album	Label	Notes
1965	Charles Aznavour en castellano	Barclay	Reissued in 1965–67, Disc Jockey.
1965	Mas Charles Aznavour en castellano	Barclay	Reissued in 1965–67, Disc Jockey.
1967	Charles Aznavour en castellano	Barcay	
1967	Canta en español	Monument	
1968	Canta en español, Volume 2	Monument	
1971	El amor	Orfeon	
1972	Canta en español, vol. 1	Barclay	
1973	Que solo estoy	Barclay	
1975	Aznavour Español	Barclay	
1978	Los Éxitos De Charles Aznavour	Gramusic	
1981	Aznavour en Español (Selección)	Barclay/MoviePlay	
1981	Aznavour en Español, vol. 2	Barclay/MoviePlay	
1982	Oro	Barclay/MoviePlay	
1984	En español	Barclay	
1990	Sus canciones	Victoria/PDI	2 LP.
1990	Sus canciones	PDI	Reissued in 1991 "Venecia sin ti", MUSARM/France; Reissued in 1995 "Venecia sin ti", EMI Music Holland.
1990	Sus canciones, vol. 2	PDI	Reissued in 1991 "La bohemia", MUSARM/France.
1990	Isabel	PDI	Reissued in 1991 "Isabel", MUSARM/France.
1992	20 Grandes Éxitos en Español	Musarm	
1995	Grandes Éxitos de Charles Aznavour	EMI	
2001	Los Grandes Éxitos	EMI	2 CD
2002	Sus Mas Grandes Éxitos	EMI	
2003	40 Grandes Éxitos en Español	EMI	2 CD
2005	Platinum Collection	EMI	2 CD
2005	Lo mejor de Charles Aznavour	EMI	
2007	Grandes Éxitos y Grandes Éxitos en Español	EMI	2 CD + DVD
2014	Aznavour Sings In Spanish – Best Of	Universal	Digital Release

== Italian discography ==
=== Studio albums ===
Year	Album	Label	Notes
1963	Aznavour Italiano Volume 1	Monument	Reissued in 2024 in the boxset The Complete Work, Barclay.
1963	Aznavour Italiano Volume 2	Barclay	Reissued in 2024 in the boxset The Complete Work, Barclay.
1970	... e fu subito Aznavour	Barclay	Reissued in 2024 in the boxset The Complete Work, Barclay.
1971	Quando la canzone e' arte / Buon anniversario (Aznavour... l'amore)	Barclay	Includes some previously released titles; Reissued in 2024 in the boxset The Complete Work, Barclay.
1972	Canto l'amore perché credo che tutto derivi da esso	Barclay	Reissued in 2024 in the boxset The Complete Work, Barclay.
1973	Il bosco e la riva	Barclay	Reissued in 2024 in the boxset The Complete Work, Barclay.
1975	Del mio amare te	Barclay	Reissued in 2024 in the boxset The Complete Work, Barclay.
1977	Charles Aznavour (Compagno)	Philips	Reissued in 2024 in the boxset The Complete Work, Barclay.
1978	Un Natale un po' speciale	Philips	Christmas album; Reissued in 2024 in the boxset The Complete Work, Barclay.
1979	Ave Maria	Philips	Reissued in 2024 in the boxset The Complete Work, Barclay.
1981	Essere	G et G Rec.	Reissued in 2024 in the boxset The Complete Work, Barclay.
1983	La prima danza	G et G Rec.	Reissued in 2024 in the boxset The Complete Work, Barclay.
1986	Canzoni da leggere e da cantare	G et G Rec.	Reissued in 2024 in the boxset The Complete Work, Barclay.
1988	Momenti si, momenti no	Musarm	Reissued in 1991, Musarm 700010 (France); Reissued in 2024 in the boxset The Complete Work, Barclay.

=== EPs ===
Year	Album	Label	Notes
1964	Charles Aznavour chante en italien La mamma – Devi sapere (Il faut savoir) – Dammi i tuoi 16 anni (Donne tes 16 ans) – L'amore è come un giorno (L'amour c'est comme un jour)	Barclay	

=== Singles ===
Year	Album	Label	Notes
1961	Devi sapere – La marcia degli angeli	Barclay	Reissued in 2024 in the boxset The Complete Work, Barclay.
1962	L'amore e la guerra – Il figliol prodigo	Barclay	Reissued in 2024 in the boxset The Complete Work, Barclay.
1962	Devi sapere – L'amore e la guerra	Barclay	
1963	La mamma [in french] – La mamma [in italian]	Barclay	
1963	Vita Mia – L'Amore È Come Un Giorno	Barclay	
1963	Dammi I Tuoi 16 Anni – Aspetto Te	Barclay	
1965	Ma perché – Com'è triste Venezia	Barclay	First version of "Com'è triste Venezia"; Reissued in 2024 in the boxset The Complete Work, Barclay.
1967	La bohème [in italian] – Bastava che ti amassi	Barclay	Reissued in 2024 in the boxset The Complete Work, Barclay.
1967	... E io tra di voi – Perché sei mia	Barclay	First versions of these two titles; Reissued in 2024 in the boxset The Complete Work, Barclay.
1968	L'istrione – Caroline chérie [en italien]	Barclay	First version of "L'istrione"; Reissued in 2024 in the boxset The Complete Work, Barclay.
1969	Oramai – La tua luce	Sif	Reissued in 2024 in the boxset The Complete Work, Barclay.
1970	Dopo l'amore – Perché sei mia	Barclay	
1970	I Lupi Attorno A Noi – Parigi In Agosto	Barclay	
1970	Ed io tra di voi – Ti lasci andare	Barclay	
1970	Ieri Si – La boheme (en italien)	Barclay	
1970	Buon Anniversario – Qui	Barclay	
1971	No, Non Lo Scorderò Mai – Morire D'Amore	Barclay	
1972	Quel che non si fa più – Ho vissuto	Barclay	
1973	Noi Andremo A Verona – Quel Che Non Si Fa Più		
1974	Lei – La Baraka		
1975	Del Mio Amare Te – Io Amo		
1977	Compagno – Come Uno Stupido	Philips	
1978	Maria che se ne va – Tu e solamente tu	Philips	
1981	Poi passa – Une vita d'amore	GG	
1989	Per te Armenia – Sono caduti*	Enigma	* Spoken by Vittorio Gassman

=== Compilations ===
Year	Album	Label	Notes
1967	Aznavour Italiano Volume 1	Monument	
1970	Charles Aznavour e le sue canzoni	Barclay	
1972	Charles Aznavour canta italiano	Barclay	
1984	Charles Aznavour	Barclay	
1988	La mamma	CD NG	
1988	L'istrione	CD NG	
1988	Com'é triste Venezia	CD NG	
1991	Aznavour italiano	EMI	
1991	Aznavour italiano – La mamma	Musarm	
1991	Aznavour italiano – L'istrione	Musarm	
1994	Dedicato all'amore...	G & G Records	
1995	I classici di Charles Aznavour	EMI	
2004	Platinum Collection	EMI	2 CD
2014	L'Istrione – The Very Best Of	Universal	

== German discography ==
=== Studio albums ===
Year	Album	Label	Notes
1964	Von Mensch Zu Mensch	Barclay	Reissued in 1965–66 under the name Charles Aznavour in Deutschland, Barclay; Reissued in 2024 in the boxset The Complete Work, Barclay.
1967	König des chansons	Barclay	Includes some previously released titles; Reissued in 2024 in the boxset The Complete Work, Barclay.
1978	Vor dem Winter	Prisma Crystal	Reissued in 2024 in the boxset The Complete Work, Barclay.
1980	Melodie des Lebens	Mam	Reissued in 2024 in the boxset The Complete Work, Barclay.
1995	Du und ich	EMI	Reissued in 2024 in the boxset The Complete Work, Barclay.

=== EPs ===
Year	Album	Label	Notes
1960	Du läßt dich geh'n – Spiel', Zigeuner – Ich frag' mich warum – Ich sah mich als Star	Ariola	Reissued in 1964, Barclay; Reissued in 2024 in the boxset The Complete Work, Barclay.

=== Singles ===
Year	Album	Label	Notes
1962	Du läßt dich geh'n – Ich frag' mich warum	Barclay	
1963	Afrika Song – Man muss versthen	Barclay-Ariola	Reissued on 2024 in the boxset The Complete Work, Barclay.
1963	Es war nicht so gemeint – Warum läßt du mich so allein	Barclay	
1963	Playboy’s Abschied (Wie es war) – Du übertreibst	Barclay	
1964	Für mich – For Me – Formidable – Zu spät	Barclay	
1966	Bitte bleib' – La mamma [in german]	Barclay	Reissued in 2024 in the boxset The Complete Work, Barclay.
1966	La Bohème [in german] – Mit dir kam das Glück	Barclay	Reissued in 2024 in the boxset The Complete Work, Barclay.
1967	Und trotzdem lieb' ich sie – Geliebte	Barclay	Reissued in 2024 in the boxset The Complete Work, Barclay.
1967	Ich halte dich schon warm – Yerushalaïm [in german]	Barclay	Reissued in 2024 in the boxset The Complete Work, Barclay.
1968	Caroline [in german] – Die Kinder des Krieges	Barclay-Metronome	Reissued in 2024 in the boxset The Complete Work, Barclay.
1971	In deutsch Mourir d'aimer [in german] – Nein, ich vergaß nichts davon	Barclay	Reissued in 2024 in the boxset The Complete Work, Barclay.
1972	Tanz Wange an Wange mit mir – Wie sie sagen	Barclay	Reissued in 2024 in the boxset The Complete Work, Barclay.
1974	Sie – Tanz Wange an Wange mit mir [2nd version]	Barclay	MB 28.110
1974	Sie [2nd version] – Tanz Wange an Wange mit mir [2nd version]	Barclay	62 079; Reissued in 2024 in the boxset The Complete Work, Barclay.
1978	Venedig in grau – Wie verrückte zu leben	Barclay	

=== Compilations ===
Year	Album	Label	Notes
1962	Charles Aznavour	Barclay	
1967	Die Geliebte Stimme	Barclay	
1968	Charles Le Grand	Barclay	
1973	Portrait eines Stars	Barclay	
1974	Singt Deutsch	Barclay	
1974	Singt Deutsch (2)	Barclay	
1982	Du läßt dich geh'n	Amiga	
2001	Aznavour – Best of	EMI	
2004	Charles Aznavour – Das Beste auf Deutsch	EMI	
2014	Charles Aznavour – Das Beste	Barclay	

== Live albums ==
Year	Album	Label	Notes
1966	The World Of Charles Aznavour: All About Love, Recorded Live! At The Huntington Hartford Theatre Hollywood	Reprise	Huntington Hartford Theatre Hollywood, 1965-11-19; Reissued in CD for the first time in 2016 as a part of La collection officielle Charles Aznavour – Une vie en chansons – 50 albums de légende, Polygram Collections/Barclay (France); Reissued in 2018 in the boxset Les années Barclay; Reissued in 2024 in the boxset The Complete Work, Barclay.
1968	Face au public	Barclay	Olympia 1968-01-19; Reissued in 1998 Aznavour live à l'Olympia, EMI; Reissued in 2009 for digital download; Reissued in 2024 in the boxset The Complete Work, Barclay.
1968	Aznavour à Tokio	Barclay/Japan	Kosei-Nenkim Hall, Tokyo 1968-05-21; Reissued in CD for the first time in 2024 in the boxset The Complete Work, Barclay.
1971	Charles Aznavour live in Japan	Barclay/Japan	Tokyo 1971; Reissued in CD for the first time in 2018 as a part of the boxset Les années Barclay; Reissued in 2024 in the boxset The Complete Work, Barclay.
1973	Aznavour chez lui, à Paris	Barclay	Olympia, November 72; Reissued partially in 1998 Aznavour live à l'Olympia, EMI; Reissued partially in 2009 for digital download; Reissued in 2024 in the boxset The Complete Work, Barclay.
1973	Ce soir là, Aznavour. Son passé au présent	Barclay	Olympia 72-12-12; Reissued partially in 1998 Aznavour live à l'Olympia, EMI; Reissued partially in 2009 for digital download; Reissued in 2024 in the boxset The Complete Work, Barclay.
1976	Plein feu sur Aznavour	Barclay	Olympia 76-02-21 (Reissued in 2004 Intégrale Charles Aznavour – Arc de triomphe, EMI)
1976	Live in Japan 76	Barclay/Japan	Yubin-Chokin Kaikan Hall & Nakano Sun-Plaza Hall, Tokyo 1976; Reissued in CD for the first time in 2024 in the boxset The Complete Work, Barclay.
1978	Guichets fermés	Barclay	Recorded live at Paris Olympia, January 12–14, 1978; Reissued partially in 1998 Aznavour live à l'Olympia, EMI; Reissued partially in 2009 for digital download; Reissued in 2024 in the boxset The Complete Work, Barclay.
1981	1980... Charles Aznavour est à l'Olympia	Barclay	Olympia 1980; Reissued in 1998 Aznavour live à l'Olympia, EMI; Reissued in 2009 for digital download; Reissued in 2024 in the boxset The Complete Work, Barclay.
1987	Récital Aznavour	Tréma	Palais des congrès 1987; Reissued in 2009 for digital download; Reissued in 2024 in the boxset The Complete Work, Barclay.
1995	Palais des Congrès 1994	EMI	Reissued in 2009 for digital download; Reissued in 2024 in the boxset The Complete Work, Barclay.
1996	Charles Aznavour au Carnegie Hall	EMI	June 1995; Reissued in 2003 for digital download; Reissued in 2024 in the boxset The Complete Work, Barclay.
1999	Palais des congrès 97/98	EMI	Reissued in 2011 for digital download; Reissued in 2024 in the boxset The Complete Work, Barclay.
2001	Palais des congrès 2000	EMI	Reissued in 2003 for digital download; Reissued in 2024 in the boxset The Complete Work, Barclay.
2005	Bon anniversaire Charles – Palais des congrès 2004	EMI	Reissued in 2024 in the boxset The Complete Work, Barclay.
2009	Radio Suisse Romande présente : Studio Recording at Lausanne (1954) & Concert Live at Lausanne (1955)	RSR	
2013	Live in Paris – April 3, 1962	Body & Soul	Digital release; Reissued on CD in 2018, Socadisc.
2014	Live au Carnegie Hall New York 1963	Barclay	Digital release (also released in the 60-CD Anthologie Boxset, 2014).
2015	Aznavour Live – Palais des Sports 2015	Barclay	Reissued in 2024 in the boxset The Complete Work, Barclay.
2017	Olympia février 1976	Barclay	2 CD; Includes previously unreleased material; This is an extended and complete version of the Plein feu sur Aznavour released in 1976 and reissued in 2004; Reissued in 2024 in the boxset The Complete Work, Barclay.
2024	Live à Toronto 1980	Barclay	Released for the first time in CD in 2024 in the boxset The Complete Work, Barclay.
2024	À l'Opéra d'Erevan, Arménie (21 septembre 1996)	Barclay	Released for the first time in CD in 2024 in the boxset The Complete Work, Barclay.

== Collaborations and guest appearances ==
Year	Album	Other artist(s)	Notes
1968	Caroline chérie [Original Motion Picture Soundtrack]	Georges Garvarentz	Contains "Caroline" by Aznavour (Barclay).
1972	Les galets d'Étretat [Original Motion Picture Soundtrack]	Georges Garvarentz	Contains "Les galets d'Étretat" by Aznavour (Barclay).
1976	Charles Aznavour presents Liesbeth List performing some of his finest songs	Liesbeth List	Contains "Don't Say A Word" by Liesbeth List with Aznavour (Philips).
1979	La lumière des justes [Original Motion Picture Soundtrack]	Georges Garvarentz	Contains "Être" by Aznavour (Barclay).
1981	Téhéran 43 [Original Motion Picture Soundtrack]	Georges Garvarentz	Contains "Une vie d'amour" by Aznavour (Barclay).
1982	Qu'est-ce qui fait courir David ? [Original Motion Picture Soundtrack]	Various Artists	Contains "Viens, donne-nous la main" by Aznavour (SPI Milan).
1983	Édith et Marcel [Original Motion Picture Soundtrack]	Mama Béa	Contains "Je n'attendais que toi", "C'est un gars" by Mama Béa with Aznavour; "Au creux de mon épaule" by Aznavour (Pathé Marconi).
1983	Les compagnons de la chanson – Olympia 1983 (live)	Les compagnons de la chanson	Contains "La légende de Stenka Razine" by Les compagnons with Aznavour (Philips).
1987	Chants traditionnels arméniens made in USA	Seda Aznavour	Contains "Yes kou rimet'n thim kidi" by Seda Aznavour with Charles Aznavour (Pathé Marconi).
1990	Serge Prokofiev/Pierre et le loup – Symphonie classique – Ouverture sur des thèmes juifs – Marche	Claudio Abbado	Narrator (French version): Charles Aznavour; Narrator (German Version): Barbara Sukowa; Narrator (English Version): STING; Narrator (Italian Version): Roberto Benigni; Narrator (Spanish Version): José Carreras (Deutsche Grammophon)
1992	La belle et la bête [Original Motion Picture Soundtrack]	Liane Foly	Contains "La belle et la bête" by Liane Foly with Aznavour (Walt Disney Adès).
1993	Duets	Frank Sinatra	Contains "You Make Me Feel So Young" by Frank Sinatra with Aznavour (Capitol Records).
1994	Les Restos du coeur	Patrick Bruel	Contains "Hier encore" by Patrick Bruel with Aznavour (WEA).
1995	Aznavour – Minnelli au Palais des Congrès de Paris (Live)	Liza Minnelli	Recorded live between November 20 & December 15, 1991, EMI; Reissued in 2009 for digital download.
1995	Christmas in Vienna III (Live)	Plàcido Domingo and Sissel Kyrkjebø	Concert with Plàcido Domingo and Sissel Kyrkjebø (Sony, Live); Reissued as Vienna Noël.
1995	Merci d'être venus	Jean-Jacques Milteau	Contains "Et bâiller et dormir" by J. J. Milteau with Aznavour (Quelques notes/Odéon/EMI).
1996	Cherchez l'idole [Original Motion Picture Soundtrack] (1963)	Georges Garvarentz	Previously unreleased Soundtrack; All the songs written by Charles Aznavour and Georges Garvarentz; Contains "Et pourtant" by Aznavour (Clemusic).
1997	Concert acoustique M6 (Live)	France Gall	Contains "La mamma" by France Gall with Aznavour (WEA).
1998	Quand la radio fait son spectacle, vol. 1	Various Artists	Contains "J'ai bu" and "L'héritage infernal" recorded at Radio Suisse Romande, Lausanne, April 1, 1947.
1999	Les Restos du cœur 99	Muriel Robin	Contains "La bohème" by Muriel Robin with Aznavour; "Emmenez-moi" and "La chanson des restos" by all the artists with Aznavour (BMG).
1999	Calle Salud	Compay Segundo	Contains "Morir de amor" by Compay Segundo with Aznavour (GASA).
1999	Nosso mundo	Trio Esperanza	Contains "Uma bela historia" by Trio Esperanza with Aznavour (Philips).
2000	Noël ensemble	Axelle Red	Contains "Noël à Paris" by Axelle Red with Aznavour (Universal).
2001	Feelings (hommage à Loulou Gasté)	Various Artists	Contains "Oui (si tu me dis « oui »)" by Aznavour (Sony Music).
2001	Charles Aznavour présente Swings de bohème (Live)	Chanson Contemporaine	Contains "La mamma" and "Emmenez-moi" by Chanson contemporaine with Aznavour.
2002	Intégrale Charles Trénet Vol. 6: "L'Âme Des Poètes"	Charles Trénet	Contains "L'héritage infernal" recorded at Radio Suisse Romande, Lausanne, April 1, 1947.
2002	Entre-deux	Patrick Bruel	Contains "Ménilmontant" by Patrick Bruel with Aznavour (BMG).
2003	L'hymne à la môme (hommage à Édith Piaf)	Édith Piaf	Contains "Il y avait" by Edith Piaf with Aznavour; "L'hymne à l'amour" by all the artists with Aznavour (EMI).
2004	Bon anniversaire Charles ! (Live)	Various Artists	Including guest stars Johnny Halliday, Isabelle Boulay, Liza Minnelli & Nana Mouskouri (EMI).
2005	Et puis la terre...	Various Artists	Contains "Et puis la terre" by all the artists with Aznavour.
2006	Piano voix	Jean-Yves D'Angelo	Contains "Et bâiller et dormir" by Jean-Yves d'Angelo with Aznavour (Sony BMG).
2007	Plein du monde	Bratsch	Contains "La goutte d'eau" by Bratsch with Aznavour (Odeon Records).
2007	Forever cool	Dean Martin	Contains "Everybody Loves Somebody" by Dean Martin with Aznavour (EMI).
2007	20 000 lieues sous les mers – D'après Jules Verne	Jacques Gamblin	Read by Charles Aznavour and Jacques Gamblin (Frémeaux & associés).
2008	Charles Aznavour et ses amis au Palais Garnier (Live)	Various Artists	Including guest stars Florent Pagny, Calogero & Grand corps malade; Recorded at Opéra national de Paris, 2007-02-17 (EMI).
2008	A l'ombre du show-business	Kery James	Contains "À l'ombre du show-business" by Kery James with Aznavour.
2009	Raphael	Raphael	Contains "La bohème" by Raphael with Aznavour (Sony Music).
2009	Meine Schönsten Welterfolge vol. 2	Nana Mouskouri	Contains "To die of love" (previously unreleased version) with Aznavour (Mercury Records).
2010	1 Geste pour Haïti chérie	Various Artists	Contains "1 Geste pour Haïti chérie" recorded by the group including Aznavour (Universal)
2010	Hishadak	Seda Aznavour	Contains "Sirerk" by Seda & Charles Aznavour.
2010	Retrouvailles	Gilles Vigneault	Contains "Une branche à la fenêtre" by Gilles Vigneault with Aznavour (Tandem).
2010	3e temps	Grand Corps Malade	Contains "Tu es donc j'apprends" by Fabien Marsaud with Aznavour (Universal Music).
2011	Chico & the Gypsies chantent Charles Aznavour	Chico and the Gypsies	Contains "T'espero" by Chico & the Gypsies with Aznavour (Strategic Marketing).
2012	Petula	Petula Clark	Contains "Les vertes années" by Petula Clark with Aznavour (Vogue).
2012	The Soldiers	The Soldiers	Contains "She" by The Soldiers with Aznavour (Demon Music Group).
2013	Luis	Vincent Niclo	Contains "Esperanza" by Vincent Niclo with Aznavour (Barclay).
2013	Ces Noëls d'autrefois	Paul Daraîche	Contains "Noël au saloon" by Paul Daraîche with Aznavour (Mp3 disques).
2013	Born Rocker Tour	Johnny Hallyday	Contains "Sur ma vie" by Johnny Hallyday with Aznavour (Warner Music).
2014	Engelbert Calling	Engelbert Humperdinck	Contains "She" by Engelbert Humperdinck with Aznavour (Conehead).
2014	Aznavour, Sa Jeunesse	Various Artists	Contains "Sa jeunesse" recorded by Charles Aznavour, Matt Houston, The Shady Brothers, Vitaa, Elisa Tovati, Soprano, Black M & Amel Bent (Barclay).
2014	Paris	Zaz	Contains "J'aime Paris au mois de mai" by Zaz with Aznavour (Warner).
2015	Live in Paris: French Chanson, 1957	Various Artists	Charles Aznavour sings "On ne sait jamais" (Live at Olympia June 12, 1957, previously unreleased recording).
2015	Michel Legrand & ses amis	Michel Legrand	Contains "Les moulins de mon coeur" by Aznavour with Michel Legrand (Smart).
2017	Ici et ailleurs	Idir	Contains "La boheme" (in French and Kabyle) by Idir with Aznavour (Columbia).
2018	Par-dessus l'épaule	Marcel Amont	Contains "Le mexicain" by Marcel Amont with Aznavour (MCA).

== Other album appearances ==
=== Various artist compilation albums ===
Year	Title(s)	Album	Notes
1986	"Toi et moi"	20 ans de Tréma – 20 succès	Tréma.
1998	"Je n'attendais que toi"	Les chansons originales des films de Claude Lelouch	With Mama Béa; Milan/BMG.
2000	"Les enfants"	Nouveau monde	With Les Petits Chanteurs à la Croix de Bois; UNICEF.
2001	"Le Temps Des Loups", "Caroline", "Les Galets D'Étretat", etc.	Charles Aznavour/Georges Garvarentz – Chansons de film	Austerlitz.
2002	"J'ai bu", "C'est le printemps", "Départ express", etc.	Roche et Aznavour – Premières chansons	Disques XXI.

== In Canada only ==
Year	Album	Label	Notes
1962	Charles Aznavour au Canada	Barclay/Canada	Compilation; Feature a first version of Le jour se lève.

== In Venezuela only ==
Year	Album	Label	Notes
1967	Entre deux rêves	Barclay/Venezuela	Feature a first version of S'il y avait une autre toi.

== Video albums ==
=== Video ===
- 1977 Großer Unterhaltungsabend – Charles Aznavour (Essen, Germany 1977). VHS Nikkatsu Video Films Co., Ltd./Japan
- 1982 An Evening with Charles Aznavour (Duke of York's Theatre, London 1982). VIP Videocassette Diffusion, VHS SECAM MU 550

=== Laserdisc ===
- 1982 An Evening with Charles Aznavour (Duke of York's Theatre, London 1982) [content differs from the video version]

=== DVD/BD ===
- 1999 Aznavour Live – Palais des Congrès 97/98 (EMI)
- 2001 Aznavour Live – Olympia 68/72/78/80 (EMI)
- 2001 Charles Aznavour au Carnegie Hall (New York, June 1996) (EMI)
- 2001 AZNAVOUR – Pour toi Arménie (At Yerevan Opera, September 1996)
- 2003 AZNAVOUR LIVE – Palais des Congrès 1994 (EMI)
- 2004 Aznavour – Minnelli au Palais des Congrès de Paris (EMI)
- 2004 Toronto 1980 (as a Bonus to the Aznavour/Indispensables CD Boxset) (EMI)
- 2004 Bon Anniversaire Charles – Palais des congrès 2004 (EMI)
- 2004 80 – Bon anniversaire Charles! (TV broadcast concert for Charles Aznavour 80th anniversary, 22 May 2004) (EMI)
- 2005 Charles Aznavour 2000 – Concert intégral (EMI)
- 2007 Charles Aznavour et ses amis à Erevan (EMI)
- 2007 Aznavour – Palais des Congrès de Paris (1987) [not the same concert as the CD version] (EMI)
- 2008 Charles Aznavour et ses amis au Palais Garnier (EMI)
- 2009 Anthologie 1955–1972 – 3 DVD Box Set (PAL Only? was NTSC in Canada) (INA / EMI)
- 2010 Anthologie volume 2 1973–1999 – 3 DVD Box Set (PAL Only? was NTSC in Canada) (INA / EMI)
- 2015 Aznavour Live – Palais des Sports 2015 (DVD & BD, Barclay)

=== Collaborations ===
- 2002 Patrick Bruel – Entre-Deux (C. Aznavour sings Parlez-moi d'amour [with Patrick Bruel])
- 2006 The Royal Opera – Die Fledermaus (Covent Garden, London 31 December 1983) (C. Aznavour sings She)

== Selective discography as an author or composer ==
- 1961 Dansez chez Daniela [Original Motion Picture Soundtrack from the movie by Max Pecas "De quoi tu t'mêles Daniela"]. Music: Charles Aznavour et Georges Garvarentz (Ricordi, 30 P 018).
- 1965 Marco Polo [Original Motion Picture Soundtrack]. Music: Georges Garvarentz; Lyrics of the original version of Somewhere: Charles Aznavour (Reissued in 1998, Tickertape, TT3006).
- 1966 Georges Guétary et Jean Richard – Monsieur Carnaval. Music: Charles Aznavour; Lyrics: Jacques Plante (Reissued in 2015, Marianne Mélodie).
- 1973 Marcel Merkès & Paulette Merval – Douchka. French opéra comique of Charles Aznavour & Georges Garvarentz (Reissued in 2001, Sony, SMM 501710 2).
- 1981 Jean Claudric joue Charles Aznavour (avec l'Orchestre Colonne). (Enregistrement public, 1981; Cybelia, 1998)
- 1996 Karen Brunon interprète Aznavour. (Odeon Records, 1996)
- 1998 Ils chantent Aznavour. (Éditions Atlas, 1998)
- 2003 Raoul Duflot-Verez – 10 Chansons adaptées pour Piano Solo. (Folio Music, 2003)
- 2003 Piaf chante Aznavour. (2003, Compilation)
- 2004 Maurice Larcange joue Aznavour et Trénet. (Universal France, 2004, 2006, Compilation)
- 2005 Emmenez-moi [Original Motion Picture Soundtrack]. (Warner, 2005)
- 2005 Aujourd'hui encore... Hommage à Aznavour. (Trilogie/Québec, 2005)
- 2006 Jehan chante Bernard Dimey et Charles Aznavour – Le cul de ma soeur. Music: Charles Aznavour; Lyrics: Bernard Dimey (Mosaic Music, 2006).
- 2008 Charles Aznavour et ses premiers interprètes. (Frémeaux, Compilation, 2 CD)
- 2008 Vive Aznavour – 70 artistes essentiels chantent ses premiers succès. (Marianne Melodie, Compilation, 5 CD)

== Songs catalogue ==
- International Catalog of all recordings available
