= Aznavour (disambiguation) =

Charles Aznavour (1924–2018) was a French and Armenian singer, songwriter, actor, public activist and diplomat.

Aznavour or Aznavourian may also refer to:

== Places ==
- Charles Aznavour Square, Yerevan, Armenia
- Charles Aznavour Square, Gyumri, Armenia
- Aznavour Centre commonly known as the Charles Aznavour Museum, Aznavour Foundation's cultural project in Yerevan, Armenia

== Music ==
- Charles Aznavour (Il faut savoir), a 1961 album
- Charles Aznavour (Je m'voyais déjà), a 1961 album
- Aznavour 65, 1965 French studio album by Charles Aznavour

== Film ==
- Monsieur Aznavour, a 2024 biopic about Charles Aznavour

== Sports ==
- Aznavour FC or Aznavour Noyemberyan, a defunct Armenian football club from Noyemberyan, Armenia

== Others with the given name or surname ==
- Hovsep Aznavur (1854–1935), Ottoman Armenian architect
- Karina Aznavourian (born 1974), Russian-Armenian épée fencer
- Seda Aznavour (born 1947), French-Armenian female singer and artist, the daughter of Charles Aznavour
