= Charles Aznavour (disambiguation) =

Charles Aznavour (1924–2018) was a French and Armenian singer, songwriter, actor, public activist and diplomat

Charles Aznavour may also refer to:

== Places ==
- Charles Aznavour Square, Yerevan, Armenia
- Charles Aznavour Square, Gyumri, Armenia
- Charles Aznavour Museum, museum in Yerevan, Armenia

== Music ==
- Charles Aznavour (Il faut savoir), 1961 album
- Charles Aznavour (Je m'voyais déjà), 1961 album

== See also ==
- Aznavour
