= Chante Charles Aznavour, vol. 2 =

Studio album by Charles Aznavour
- Released: 1955
- Genre: Chanson
- Label: Ducretet Thomson

Charles Aznavour chronology
Chante Charles Aznavour	Chante Charles Aznavour, vol. 2	Chante Charles Aznavour, vol. 3

Chante Charles Aznavour, vol. 2 is a 1955 album by Charles Aznavour. It was the second of three similarly titled 10" vinyl LPs for Ducretet-Thomson at the very beginning of the Charles Aznavour discography, his previous recordings having been on the first issue in a series of, eventually, six EPs 1954–1956.

== Track list ==
A1. Ça
A2. Parce que
A3. Heureux avec des riens
A4. Viens au creux de mon épaule
A5. L'Émigrant
B1. Je t'aime comme ça
B2. Les Chercheurs d'or
B3. Je veux te dire adieu
B4. Toi
B5. À t'regarder
