= La Bohème (album) =

- Original French album cover

Studio album by Charles Aznavour
- Released: 1966
- Genre: Chanson
- Length: 51:14
- Label: Barclay
- Producer: Paul Mauriat (orchestration)

Charles Aznavour chronology
Aznavour 65 (1965)	La Bohème (1966)	De t'avoir aimée (1966)

Charles Aznavour, also known as La Bohème, is an album by French-Armenian singer Charles Aznavour, released in 1966. It included such international hits as "La Bohème" and "Jezebel". The album includes songs by Charles Aznavour, Georges Garvarentz, Gilbert Bécaud and others. In 1966 it was originally released by Barclay Records in France and Canada, then by Reprise Records in the US (as Aznavour).

It was reissued in 1996 by EMI.

== Track listing ==
1. La Bohème (Charles Aznavour/Jacques Plante)
2. Aime-moi (Charles Aznavour/Jacques Plante)
3. Quelque chose ou quelqu'un (Charles Aznavour/Jacques Plante)
4. Ça vient sans qu'on y pense (Charles Aznavour/Jacques Plante)
5. Plus rien (Charles Aznavour/Georges Garvarentz)
6. Il viendra ce jour (Charles Aznavour)
7. Paris au mois d'août (Charles Aznavour/Georges Garvarentz)
8. Sur le chemin du retour (Charles Aznavour/Georges Garvarentz)
9. Il fallait bien (Charles Aznavour/Armand Seguian)
10. Parce que tu crois (Charles Aznavour)
11. La Route (Charles Aznavour/Gilbert Bécaud)
12. Sarah (Charles Aznavour/Jacques Plante)
13. Je t'aime comme ca (Charles Aznavour/Jeff Davis)
14. Ay ! mourir pour toi (Charles Aznavour)
15. L'amour à fleur de coeur (Charles Aznavour)
16. C'est merveilleux l'amour (Charles Aznavour/Gilbert Bécaud)
17. Jezebel (Charles Aznavour/Wayne Shanklin)
18. À propos de pommier (Charles Aznavour/Hubert Giraud)

== Personnel ==
- Charles Aznavour - author, composer, vocals
- Georges Garvarentz - composer
- Paul Mauriat - orchestration
- Gilbert Bécaud - composer
- Jeff Davis - composer
- Gaveau - photography
- Hubert Giraud - composer
- André Gomet - photography
- Nuite de Chine - design
- Jacques Plante - lyricist
- Lévon Sayan - art direction
- Armand Seguian - composer
- Wayne Shanklin - composer
