= Chante Charles Aznavour, vol. 3 =

Studio album by Charles Aznavour
- Released: 1956
- Genre: Chanson
- Label: Ducretet Thomson

Charles Aznavour chronology
| Chante Charles Aznavour, vol. 2 | Chante Charles Aznavour, vol. 3 | Bravos du music-hall à Charles Aznavour |

Chante Charles Aznavour, vol. 3 is a 1956 album by Charles Aznavour. It was the third of three similarly titled 10" vinyl LPs for Ducretet-Thomson at the very beginning of the Charles Aznavour discography.

== Track list ==
1. A1 Sur ma vie
2. A2 On ne sait jamais
3. A3 Après l'amour
4. A4 Prends garde
5. A5 Vivre avec toi
6. B1 J'aime Paris au mois de mai
7. B2 Le Chemin de l'éternité
8. B3 J'entends ta voix
9. B4 Une enfant
10. B5 Je cherche mon amour
