= Une vie d'amour =

Song by Charles Aznavour

from the album "Téhéran 43" - Une vie d'amour
- Released: March 1981
- Genre: Chanson
- Label: Barclay Records
- Composer: Georges Garvarentz
- Lyricist: Charles Aznavour

Tamara Gverdtsiteli - Une vie d'amour (In Russian and French)

"Une vie d'amour" (A life of love) is a song written by Charles Aznavour to the music of Georges Garvarentz. The Russian lyrics of the song were written by Natalia Konchalovsky.

== History ==
The original version, sung by Aznavour in French, was introduced in the 1981 movie Teheran 43 (USSR). In March of the same year, it was released by French Barclay Records in three separate albums: Teheran 43, Autobiographie and Une vie d'amour, a single with Mireille Mathieu.

The song, whose title can be loosely translated as "A Life in Love", is a slow love ballad. There is also an alternative Russian translation (by Alexander Butuzov), a Chinese version of the song and a Yiddish version performed by the Barry Sisters.

== Other recordings ==
- Duet by Charles Aznavour and Mireille Mathieu
- Duet by Filipp Kirkorov and Alsou
- Duet by Avraam Russo and Oksana Lepska
- Duet by Lev Leshchenko and Tamara Gverdtsiteli
- Lyudmila Gurchenko
- Demis Roussos
- Alexey Vorobyov
- Duet by Larisa Dolina and Garik Martirosyan
- Valery Leontyev
- Oleg Pogudin
- Pavlo Tabakov – the song was partially translated into Ukrainian by Mariana Savka
