= Tu t'laisses aller =

Single by Charles Aznavour

from the album Je m'voyais déjà
- B-side: "J'ai perdu la tête"
- Released: 1960
- Genre: Chanson
- Length: 3:43
- Label: Barclay Records
- Songwriter: Charles Aznavour

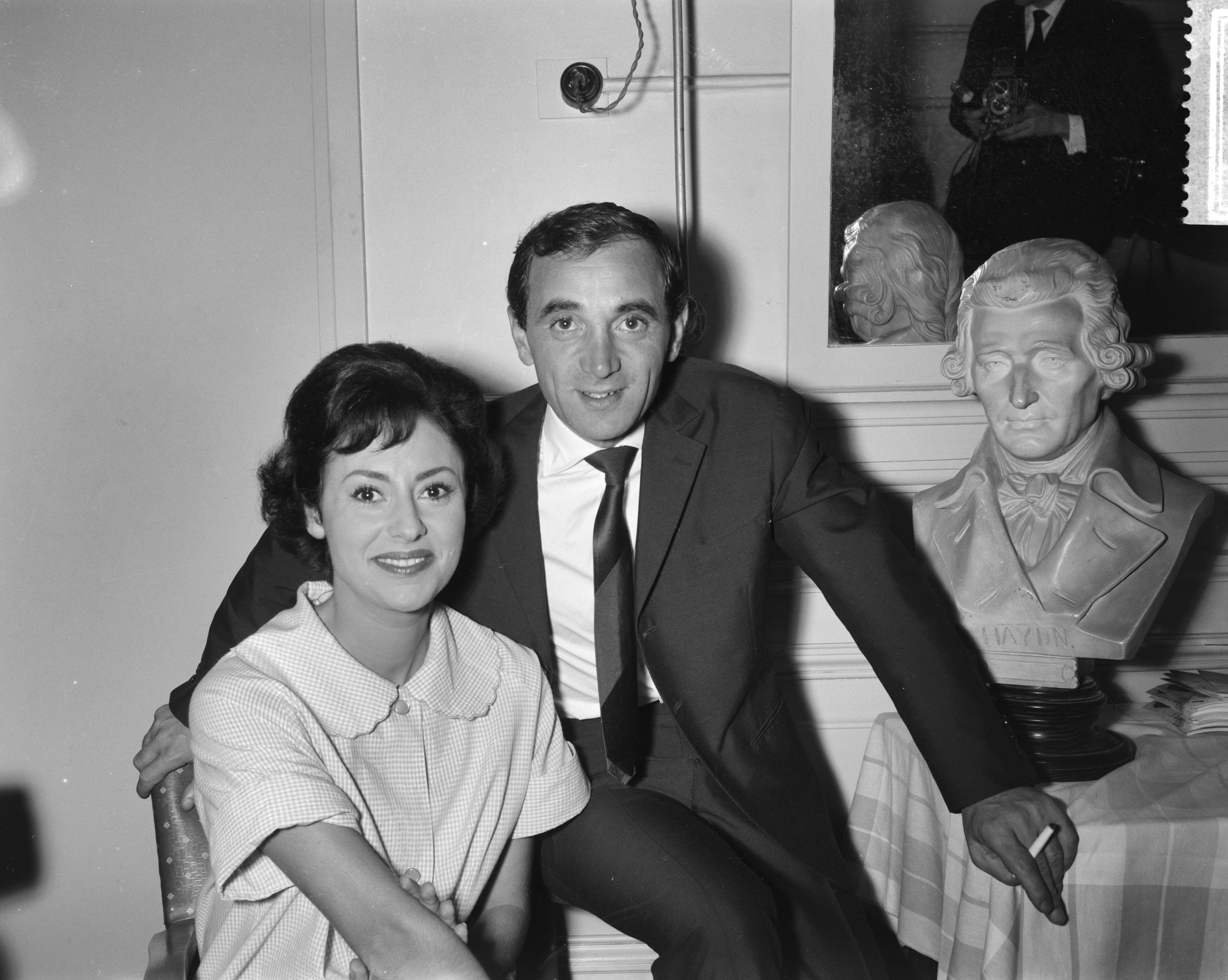
Charles Aznavour and Caterina Valente, Scheveningen, South Holland, 1961

"Tu t'laisses aller" (English: "You Let Yourself Go") is a song written in 1960 by Armenian-French artist Charles Aznavour.

== History ==
For the first time it was released as a single in 1960 by Barclay Records (with "J'ai perdu la tête" on the B-side). In 1974 a new edition was re-released as a single.

The husband drinks alcohol to have the strength to tell his wife everything he thinks about her. He says the worst possible things to her, but then he adds, that a little effort and a smiling face, and things could be just as before. In the end he calls her: "Come close to me. Let yourself go".

It was a no. 1 hit in France in 1960, a best-selling record in Belgium in 1960, and returned to the charts in 1962.

In Jean-Luc Godard's film A Woman Is a Woman, the song plays on a jukebox during a tense encounter between Anna Karina and Jean-Paul Belmondo.

In 1995 Aznavour recorded a version of "Tu t'laisses aller" in duet with Liza Minnelli (Paris — Palais des Congrès: Intégrale du spectacle).

== Adaptations ==
- German: "Du läßt dich geh'n", written by Ernst Bader
- German: "Alkohol", a new interpretation of "Du läßt dich geh'n" (the German version of the song) by Abwärts
- English: "You've Let Yourself Go", written by Marcel Stellman
- English: "You've Let Yourself Go", adaptation by Fred Ebb for Liza with a Z (1972 NBC-TV)
- Dutch: "Mijn ideaal", written by Jip Feldman, song by Corry Brokken

== Cover versions ==
- Annie Cordy
- Jacques Desrosiers (parody)
- Dieter Thomas Kuhn & Band (1998)
- Caetano Veloso á la Philarmonie, Paris, 28/08/2021.

== See also ==
- 40 chansons d'or
