= List of number-one singles of 1956 (France) =

This is a list of the French singles & airplay chart reviews number-ones of 1956.

== Number-ones by week ==
=== Singles chart ===
Week	Issue date	Artist(s)	Song	Ref.
1	5 January	Eddie and Tania Constantine	"L'Homme et L'Enfant" (lit. "The Old Man and the Little Boy")	
2	12 January	Eddie and Tania Constantine	"L'Homme et L'Enfant" (lit. "The Old Man and the Little Boy")	
3	19 January	Eddie and Tania Constantine	"L'Homme et L'Enfant" (lit. "The Old Man and the Little Boy")	
4	26 January	Eddie and Tania Constantine	"L'Homme et L'Enfant" (lit. "The Old Man and the Little Boy")	
5	2 February	Eddie and Tania Constantine	"L'Homme et L'Enfant" (lit. "The Old Man and the Little Boy")	
6	9 February	Eddie and Tania Constantine	"L'Homme et L'Enfant" (lit. "The Old Man and the Little Boy")	
7	16 February	Eddie and Tania Constantine	"L'Homme et L'Enfant" (lit. "The Old Man and the Little Boy")	
8	23 February	Eddie and Tania Constantine	"L'Homme et L'Enfant" (lit. "The Old Man and the Little Boy")	
9	1 March	Georges Brassens	"Chanson pour l'Auvergnat"	
10	8 March	Georges Brassens	"Chanson pour l'Auvergnat"	
11	15 March	Georges Brassens	"Chanson pour l'Auvergnat"	
12	22 March	Georges Brassens	"Chanson pour l'Auvergnat"	
13	29 March	Georges Brassens	"Chanson pour l'Auvergnat"	
14	5 April	Charles Aznavour	"Sur ma vie"	
15	12 April	Charles Aznavour	"Sur ma vie"	
16	19 April	Charles Aznavour	"Sur ma vie"	
17	26 April	Charles Aznavour	"Sur ma vie"	
18	3 May	Lucienne Delyle	"Amour, Castagnettes et Tango"	
19	10 May	Lucienne Delyle	"Amour, Castagnettes et Tango"	
20	17 May	Lucienne Delyle	"Amour, Castagnettes et Tango"	
21	24 May	Lucienne Delyle	"Amour, Castagnettes et Tango"	
22	31 May	Lucienne Delyle	"Amour, Castagnettes et Tango"	
23	7 June	Lucienne Delyle	"Amour, Castagnettes et Tango"	
24	14 June	Lucienne Delyle	"Amour, Castagnettes et Tango"	
25	21 June	Lucienne Delyle	"Amour, Castagnettes et Tango"	
26	28 June	Lucienne Delyle	"Amour, Castagnettes et Tango"	
27	5 July	Darío Moreno	"Je vais revoir ma blonde"	
28	12 July	Darío Moreno	"Je vais revoir ma blonde"	
29	19 July	Darío Moreno	"Je vais revoir ma blonde"	
30	26 July	Darío Moreno	"Je vais revoir ma blonde"	
31	2 August	Annie Cordy	"La Ballade de Davy Crockett"	
32	9 August	Annie Cordy	"La Ballade de Davy Crockett"	
33	16 August	Annie Cordy	"La Ballade de Davy Crockett"	
34	23 August	Annie Cordy	"La Ballade de Davy Crockett"	
35	30 August	Annie Cordy	"La Ballade de Davy Crockett"	
36	6 September	Lucienne Delyle	"Au revoir Rome"	
37	13 September	Lucienne Delyle	"Au revoir Rome"	
38	20 September	Lucienne Delyle	"Au revoir Rome"	
39	27 September	Lucienne Delyle	"Au revoir Rome"	
40	4 October	Luis Mariano	"La Plus belle chose au monde"	
41	11 October	Luis Mariano	"La Plus belle chose au monde"	
42	18 October	Luis Mariano	"La Plus belle chose au monde"	
43	25 October	Luis Mariano	"La Plus belle chose au monde"	
44	1 November	Lucienne Delyle	"Au revoir Rome"	
45	8 November	Lucienne Delyle	"Au revoir Rome"	
46	15 November	Lucienne Delyle	"Au revoir Rome"	
47	22 November	Lucienne Delyle	"Au revoir Rome"	
48	29 November	Lucienne Delyle	"Au revoir Rome"	
49	6 December	Darío Moreno	"Je vais revoir ma blonde"	
50	13 December	Darío Moreno	"Je vais revoir ma blonde"	
51	20 December	Darío Moreno	"Je vais revoir ma blonde"	
52	27 December	Gilbert Bécaud	"La Corrida"	

== See also ==
- 1956 in music
- List of number-one hits (France)
