= Aznavour toujours =

Toujours

Studio album by Charles Aznavour
- Released: August 30, 2011
- Genre: Chanson
- Length: 51:23
- Label: EMI

Charles Aznavour chronology
Radio Suisse Romande présente : Studio Recording at Lausanne (1954) & Concert Live at Lausanne (1955) (2009)	Toujours (2011)	Encores (2015)

Professional ratings
Review scores
Source	Rating
Allmusic	4.5/5 stars

Aznavour toujours (Forever the Aznavour) is the 50th French studio album by the French-Armenian singer Charles Aznavour, released in 2011. Toujours became his seventh album in the 21st century. According to Allmusic, "this collection of 12 self-penned tracks shows that the 87-year-old is still capable of cutting it alone". Album cover photograph is taken by Karl Lagerfeld.

== History ==
The songs were written and recorded in France and Belgium. For the arrangements, Eumir Deodato (Frank Sinatra, Aretha Franklin, Björk) and Yvan Cassar (Mylène Farmer, Johnny Hallyday) were invited and the album "travels to Brazil and Paris, with an occasional little trip to Broadway and even Spain for Flamenca, flamenco".

One of the songs, "J'ai Connu" (Gypsy jazz), addresses the genocides that have occurred during Aznavour's lifetime.

It was released digitally on August 30, 2011, by Capitol/EMI. After the release, Aznavour started his new Aznavour en Toute Intimité tour in 2011.

== Track listing ==
1. Viens m'emporter
2. La vie est faite de hasards
3. L'instinct du chasseur
4. Les jours
5. Que j'aime ca
6. Ce printemps-la
7. Des coups de poing
8. Flamenca Flamenco
9. J'ai connu
10. Je pense à toi
11. Elle (duet with Thomas Dutronc)
12. Tu ne m'aimes plus
13. Va

== Personnel ==
- Charles Aznavour - Adaptation, Author, Composer, Vocals
- Erwin Autrique - Programming
- Erik Berchot - Piano
- Philippe Berrod - Soloist
- Benjamin Caillaud - Pro-Tools
- Nathalie Carlucci - Alto
- Yvan Cassar - Piano
- Hervé Defranoux - Production Executive
- Françoise Demaubus - Soloist
- Eumir Deodato - Arranger, Fender Rhodes
- Pierre-François Dufour - Soloist
- Thomas Dutronc - Featured Artist, Soloist
- Jorge Fernandez - Production Executive
- Nicolas Fiszman - Basse
- Griet François - Alto
- Frédéric Gastard - Sax (Baritone), Sax (Soprano), Sax (Tenor)
- Herbert Kretzmer - Composer
- Karl Lagerfeld - Photography
- Robert Le Gall - Cuatro, Mandoline
- Alexandra Logerot-Brown - Alto
- Mathias Malher - Trombone
- Jocelyn Mienniel - Flute, Saxophone
- Nicolas Montazaud - Palmas, Percussion
- Jérome Munafo - Guitar
- Jonathan Nazet - Alto
- Frédéric Pallas - Alto
- Paris Symphonic Orchestra
- Laurent Puchard - Alto
- Eric Sauviat - Guitar
- Levon Sayan - Personal Manager
- Mark Steylaerts - Soloist
- Lionel Surin - Cor
- Jacky Terrasson - Piano
- Estelle Villotte - Alto
- Eric Wilms - Arranger, Hammond B3, Piano
- Jean-Michel Yavernier - Cor, Soloist

== Charts ==
Chart (2011)	Peak position
France	4
Belgium	4
Czech Republic	51

== Links ==
- An official video from EMI
- Album info on Aznavour's official site
- « Aznavour toujours », France Inter
