= Aznavour 65 =

Studio album by Charles Aznavour
- Released: 1965
- Genre: Chanson
- Length: 50:45
- Label: Barclay
- Producer: Paul Mauriat (orchestration)

Charles Aznavour chronology
Charles Aznavour, vol. 3 (1964)	Aznavour 65 (1965)	La Bohème (1966)

Professional ratings
Review scores
Source	Rating
Allmusic	5/5 stars

Aznavour 65 is the sixteenth French studio album by the French-Armenian singer Charles Aznavour, released in 1965. According to Allmusic, the album captures "one of French pop's best singers at the height of his talent". In 1965 The New Yorker called it Aznavour's most exciting album.

The album includes songs by Charles Aznavour, Maurice Jarre and others. Many of the songs, including "Je ne crois pas", "Une enfant", "Isabelle" and "C'est fini" became international hits.

It was reissued in 1996 by EMI.

== Track listing ==
1. Le Toréador (Charles Aznavour)
2. Je te réchaufferai (Charles Aznavour)
3. Reste (Charles Aznavour)
4. Que Dieu me garde (Charles Aznavour / Jeff Davis)
5. Isabelle (Charles Aznavour)
6. Le monde est sous nos pas (Charles Aznavour / Maurice Jarre)
7. Je ne crois pas (Charles Aznavour)
8. Les Filles d'aujourd'hui (Charles Aznavour)
9. C'est fini (Charles Aznavour)
10. Le Repos de la guerrière (Charles Aznavour / Françoise Dorin)
11. Au printemps tu reviendras (Charles Aznavour)
12. Sophie (Charles Aznavour / Jacques Plante)

== Track listing of the 1995 CD Reissue ==
1. Le Toréador (Charles Aznavour)
2. Je te réchaufferai (Charles Aznavour)
3. Reste (Charles Aznavour)
4. Que Dieu me garde (Charles Aznavour / Jeff Davis)
5. Isabelle (Charles Aznavour)
6. Le monde est sous nos pas (Charles Aznavour / Maurice Jarre)
7. Je ne crois pas (Charles Aznavour)
8. Les Filles d'aujourd'hui (Charles Aznavour)
9. C'est fini (Charles Aznavour)
10. Le Repos de la guerrière (Charles Aznavour / Françoise Dorin)
11. Au Printemps Tu Reviendras (Charles Aznavour)
12. Sophie (Charles Aznavour / Jacques Plante)
13. À t'regarder (Charles Aznavour / Jean Constantin)
14. Après l'amour (Charles Aznavour)
15. Une enfant (Charles Aznavour / Robert Chauvigny)
16. Heureux avec des riens (Charles Aznavour / Jeff Davis)
17. À tout jamais (Charles Aznavour)
18. Liberté (Charles Aznavour / Maurice Vidalin)

== Personnel ==
- Charles Aznavour - author, composer, vocals
- Eddie Barclay - orchestration
- Paul Mauriat - orchestration
- Nuit de Chine - design
- Andre Gornet - photography
- Herman Leonard - photography
- Levon Sayan - artistic consultation

== Links ==
- Reste by Aznavour (live)
- Aznavour 65 at discogs.com
