= Il faut savoir (song) =

Single by Charles Aznavour

from the album Il faut savoir
- Released: 1961
- Genre: Chanson
- Length: 3.05
- Label: Barclay Records
- Songwriter: Charles Aznavour

"Il faut savoir" (You've got to learn) is a song written in 1961 by Armenian-French artist Charles Aznavour.

== History ==
For the first time it was released as a single in 1961 by Barclay Records, with Paul Mauriat's arrangement.

It was a No 1 hit in France in 1961 (for 15 weeks) and No 42 hit of 1962 in Italy.

== Adaptations ==
- You've got to learn, written by M. Stellman (English)

== Cover versions ==
- Steve Lawrence
- Fausto Papetti (1962)
- Nina Simone (1975): You've Got To Learn

== See also ==
- Il faut savoir
