= Sur ma vie =

Single by Charles Aznavour
- Released: 1955
- Genre: Chanson
- Length: 3.09
- Label: Ducretet-Thomson
- Songwriter: Charles Aznavour

"Sur ma vie" (lit. "On My Life") is a song written by Armenian-French artist Charles Aznavour. In April 1956 it became Aznavour's first no. 1 hit in France.

== History ==
It was released as a single by Ducretet-Thomson in 1955. It starts with the words: "On my life I swore to love you 'til my dying day...".

In 1997, Ginette Reno covered it.

"Sur ma vie" was later translated into Dutch ("Zo lief") by Yvan Brunetti and performed by Doran (album Voor jou, 1998).

== See also ==
- La mamma
- 40 chansons d'or
