= 40 chansons d'or =

Greatest hits album by Charles Aznavour
- Released: 1994
- Genre: Chanson
- Label: EMI
- Director: Barry White

Professional ratings
Review scores
Source	Rating
Allmusic	4/5 stars

40 chansons d'or is a double-CD by Charles Aznavour, released in 1994 on EMI Records. It was reissued in 1996 with a different track listing.

== Track list of the 1994 edition ==
CD 1

1. Au creux de mon épaule (1989 version)
2. Sa jeunesse (1989 version)
3. Si je n'avais plus (1989 version)
4. Le Palais de nos chimères (1989 version)
5. Une enfant (1989 version)
6. À ma fille
7. Non je n'ai rien oublié
8. La Bohème
9. Les Deux Guitares
10. Comme ils dissent
11. Désormais
12. Bon anniversaire
13. Il te suffisait que je t'aime
14. Pour faire une jam (1989 version)
15. Les Comédiens
16. La Mamma
17. Emmenez-moi
18. Trousse-Chemise
19. Donne tes seize ans
20. Tu t'laisses aller

CD 2

1. Sur ma vie (1989 version)
2. J'en déduis que je t'aime (1989 version)
3. Parce que (1989 version)
4. Je m'voyais déjà
5. Que C'est Triste Venise
6. Il faut savoir
7. L'amour c'est comme un jour
8. Et pourtant
9. Hier encore
10. Paris au mois d'août
11. Après l'amour (1989 version)
12. Qui?
13. Le Temps
14. For Me Formidable
15. Avec
16. Plus bleu que tes yeux (1989 version)
17. Ce sacré piano (1989 version)
18. Les Plaisirs démodés
19. Mourir d'aimer
20. Et moi dans mon coin

== Track list of the 1996 edition ==
CD 1

1. Au creux de mon épaule
2. Sa jeunesse
3. Toi et moi
4. Le Palais de nos chimères
5. Mes emmerdes
6. À ma fille
7. Non je n'ai rien oublié
8. La Bohème
9. Les Deux Guitares
10. Comme ils dissent
11. Désormais
12. Bon anniversaire
13. Il te suffisait que je t'aime
14. Pour faire une jam
15. Les Comédiens
16. La Mamma
17. Emmenez-moi
18. Trousse chemise
19. Donne tes seize ans
20. Tu t'laisses aller

CD 2

1. Sur ma vie
2. J'en déduis que je t'aime
3. Parce que
4. Je m'voyais déjà
5. Que c'est triste Venise
6. Il faut savoir
7. L'amour c'est comme un jour
8. Et pourtant
9. Hier encore
10. Paris au mois d'août
11. Après l'amour
12. Qui?
13. Le Temps
14. For Me Formidable
15. Avec
16. Plus bleu que tes yeux
17. L'Amour et la Guerre
18. Les Plaisirs démodés
19. Mourir d'aimer
20. Jezebel
