= Autobiographie =

Studio album by Charles Aznavour
- Released: 1980
- Studio: Studio Du Palais Des Congrès
- Genre: Chanson
- Length: 33:39
- Label: Barclay
- Producer: Richard Marsan

Charles Aznavour chronology
Un enfant est né... (1978)	Autobiographie (1980)	Je fais comme si... (1982)

Autobiographie is the 30th French studio album by the French-Armenian singer Charles Aznavour, released in 1980.

== History ==
In 1980 the album became No 5 in France (42 weeks) of France (for 49 weeks).

The album includes songs by Charles Aznavour and Georges Garvarentz. It was reissued by EMI in 1998. One of the songs, Une Vie D'amour performed also in Russian, became a hit.

== Track listing (vinyl) ==
Side A:

1. Ça Passe 3:49
2. Mon Ami, Mon Judas 3:36
3. Mon Ėmouvant Amour 2:41
4. Autobiographie 7:05

Side B:

1. L'Amour Bon Dieu l'Amour 5:19
2. Allez! Vaï Marseille! 4:07
3. Je Fantasme 3:39
4. Le Souvenir de Toi 3:23

== Track listing (CD/SACD DSD upsampled) ==
1. Un Corps (bonus)
2. Je Ne Connais Que Toi (bonus)
3. Ça Passe
4. Mon Ami, Mon Judas
5. Mon Ėmouvant Amour
6. Autobiographie
7. L'Amour Bon Dieu L'Amour
8. Allez! Vaï Marseille!
9. Je Fantasme
10. Le Souvenir De Toi
11. Être (bonus)
12. Rien Moins Que l'Amour (bonus)
13. Une Vie d'Amour (version 1) (bonus)
14. Une Vie d'Amour (version 2) (bonus)(Version langue Russe)
15. Une Vie d'Amour (version 3) (bonus)( Version avec Mireille Mathieu)

== Personnel ==
- Charles Aznavour - Author, Composer, Vocals
- Georges Garvarentz - Composer
- Directed By – Christian Gaubert, Jean Claudric, Paul Mauriat
- Danielle Licari - Vocals

== Links ==
- Autobiographie (Aznavour)
