= Lévon Sayan =

French opera singer

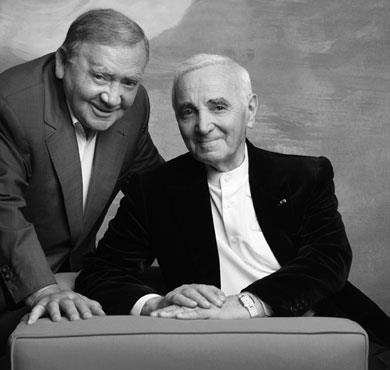
- Sayan (left) and Charles Aznavour
- Born: Levon Sanosyan; 17 December 1934 (age 91); Aix-en-Provence, France
- Occupations: tenor Producer; Impresario
- Years active: 1964 – 2013
- Known for: Manager of: Charles Aznavour; Liza Minnelli; Plácido Domingo; Mario del Monaco

Lévon Sayan or Levon Sanosyan (Armenian: Լևոն Սայան, born 17 December 1934) is a French-Armenian impresario and producer, as well as an operatic tenor.

== Biography ==
Lévon Sayan was born in Aix-en-Provence, France, in a family of Armenian genocide survivors from Sivas, who tried to emigrate to the U.S. He served in the French army in Indochina. In 1956 he moved to the US, where worked as the President of the New York Association of VIP hairdressing. He started a career as a classical singer in 1966. Sayan recorded his first disc with Renée Doria. As a tenor, he sang in "Rigoletto", "Faust", "Carmen" and other operas.

He has also been the impresario of Liza Minnelli, Plácido Domingo and Mario del Monaco, and one of Charles Aznavour's impresario (1981-2014).

Sayan is an officer of the "Légion d'honneur". He is one of the founders (among with charles Aznavour) of the charitable organization Aznavour for Armenia. In 1989 he visited Armenia for the first time. In 2008 Aznavour and Sayan were granted Armenian citizenship by the President of Armenia.

On 23 May 2003, during a special reception the president of Armenia, Robert Kocharyan, honored him with the Khorenatsi medal. In 2006 he received the "Special Prize" of the Armenian National Music Award. In 2009 Armenian President Serzh Sargsyan signed a decree on awarding Lévon Sayan with the Order of Honor.

Sayan was condemned by Charles Aznavour for depositing the brand "Aznavour pour l'Arménie" and was fined by the French courts.

== See also ==
- Pour toi Arménie
