= Charles Aznavour (Il faut savoir) =

Studio album by Charles Aznavour
- Released: 1961
- Genre: Chanson
- Length: 49:56
- Label: Barclay
- Producer: Paul Mauriat (orchestration), Eddie Barclay

Charles Aznavour chronology
Charles Aznavour (Je m'voyais déjà) (1961)	Charles Aznavour (Il faut savoir) (1961)	Charles Aznavour accompagné par Burt Random et Paul Mauriat (1962)

Professional ratings
Review scores
Source	Rating
Allmusic	4/5 stars

Charles Aznavour (Il faut savoir), released in December 1961, is the eighth French studio album by the French-Armenian singer Charles Aznavour. This album is also known under the title "Il faut savoir" (You've got to learn). It was in TOP 10 charts in France, Italy, Belgium, Israel and other countries. The album includes songs by Charles Aznavour, Georges Garvarentz, Michel Legrand, Eddie Barclay and others.

It was reissued in 1995 by EMI.

== Track listing ==
1. Il faut savoir (Charles Aznavour)
2. Ne crois surtout pas (Charles Aznavour)
3. Avec ces yeux-la (Charles Aznavour / Eddie Barclay / Michel Legrand)
4. Le Carillonneur (Charles Aznavour / Bernard Dimey)
5. J'ai tort (Charles Aznavour / Jacques Plante)
6. Lucie (Charles Aznavour)
7. Voila que ça recommence (Charles Aznavour)
8. La Marche des anges (Charles Aznavour / Georges Garvarentz)

== Track listing of the 1995 CD reissue ==
1. Il Faut Savoir (Charles Aznavour)
2. Ne Crois Surtout Pas (Charles Aznavour)
3. Avec Ces Yeux-La (Charles Aznavour / Eddie Barclay / Michel Legrand)
4. Le Carillonneur (Charles Aznavour / Bernard Dimey)
5. J'Ai Tort (Charles Aznavour / Jacques Plante)
6. Lucie (Charles Aznavour)
7. Voila Que Ca Recommence (Charles Aznavour)
8. La Marche des Anges (Charles Aznavour / Georges Garvarentz)
9. Alleluia (Charles Aznavour)
10. L' Amour C'Est Comme un Jour (Charles Aznavour / Yves Stephane)
11. Notre Amour Nous Ressemble (Charles Aznavour / Jacques Plante)
12. Au Rythme de Mon Coeur (Charles Aznavour / Léo Missir)
13. Esperanza (Charles Aznavour / Ramon Cabrera )
14. Les Comediens (Charles Aznavour / Jacques Plante)
15. Trousse Chemise (Charles Aznavour / Jacques Mareuil)
16. Tu N'As Plus (Charles Aznavour)
17. Dolores (Charles Aznavour / Jacques Plante)
18. Les Petits Matins (Charles Aznavour / Léo Missir)

== Personnel ==
- Charles Aznavour – Author, Composer, Vocals
- Burt Random – Orchestra

== Links ==
- If faut savoir (song's original version)
