= Charles Aznavour (Je m'voyais déjà) =

Studio album by Charles Aznavour
- Released: 1961
- Genre: Chanson
- Length: 52:07
- Label: Barclay
- Producer: Paul Mauriat (orchestration), Eddie Barclay

Charles Aznavour chronology
Charles Aznavour (Les deux guitares) (1960)	Charles Aznavour (1961)	Charles Aznavour (Il faut savoir) (1961)

Professional ratings
Review scores
Source	Rating
Allmusic	3/5 stars

Charles Aznavour, released in January 1961, is the seventh French studio album by the French-Armenian singer Charles Aznavour. This album is also known under the title "Je m'voyais déjà" (It Will Be My Day). The album includes songs by Charles Aznavour, Georges Garvarentz, and others. According to The book of golden discs, 'Je m'voyais deja' was one of the hits which from 1961 helped Aznavour to become "an international favourite". The album became a bestseller in Belgium and a hit in France.

It was reissued in 1995 by EMI.

== Track listing ==
1. Je m'voyais déjà (Charles Aznavour)
2. Quand tu m'embrasses (Charles Aznavour / Eddie Barclay)
3. Monsieur est mort (Bernard Dimey / Charles Aznavour)
4. L'Amour et la Guerre (Charles Aznavour / Bernard Dimey)
5. Comme des étrangers (Charles Aznavour)
6. Prends le chorus (Charles Aznavour)
7. Tu vis ta vie mon coeur (Charles Aznavour)
8. L'Enfant prodigue (Charles Aznavour / Jacques Plante)

== Track listing of the 1995 CD Reissue ==
1. Les Deux Guitares (D'Apres un Air Traditionnel Russe) (Charles Aznavour)
2. Ce Jour Tant Attendu (Charles Aznavour / Alec Siniavine)
3. Fraternité (Sur un Poeme d'Andre Salmon) (Charles Aznavour / André Salmon)
4. J'Ai des Millions de Rein du Tout (I Got Plenty O' Nuttin') (Charles Aznavour / George Gershwin)
5. J'Ai Perdu la Tête (Charles Aznavour)
6. Tu T'Laisses Aller (Charles Aznavour)
7. Rendez-Vous Á Brasilia (Charles Aznavour / Georges Garvarentz)
8. La Nuit Charles Aznavour)
9. C'n'est Pas Nécessairement (It Ain't Necessarily So) - (Charles Aznavour / George Gershwin / Ira Gershwin)
10. Plus Heureux Que Mol (Charles Aznavour)
11. Je M'Voyais Déjá (Charles Aznavour)
12. Quand Tu M'Embrasses (Charles Aznavour / Eddie Barclay)
13. Noël des Mages (Charles Aznavour)
14. L' Amour et la Guerre (Charles Aznavour / Bernard Dimey)
15. Comme des Étrangers (Charles Aznavour)
16. Prends le Chorus (Charles Aznavour)
17. Tu Vis Ta Vie Mon Coeur (Charles Aznavour)
18. L' Enfant Prodigue (Charles Aznavour / Jacques Plante)
19. Monsieur Est Mort (Charles Aznavour / Bernard Dimey)

== Personnel ==
- Charles Aznavour - Author, Composer, Vocals
