= Ducretet Thomson =

French audio manufacturer and record label

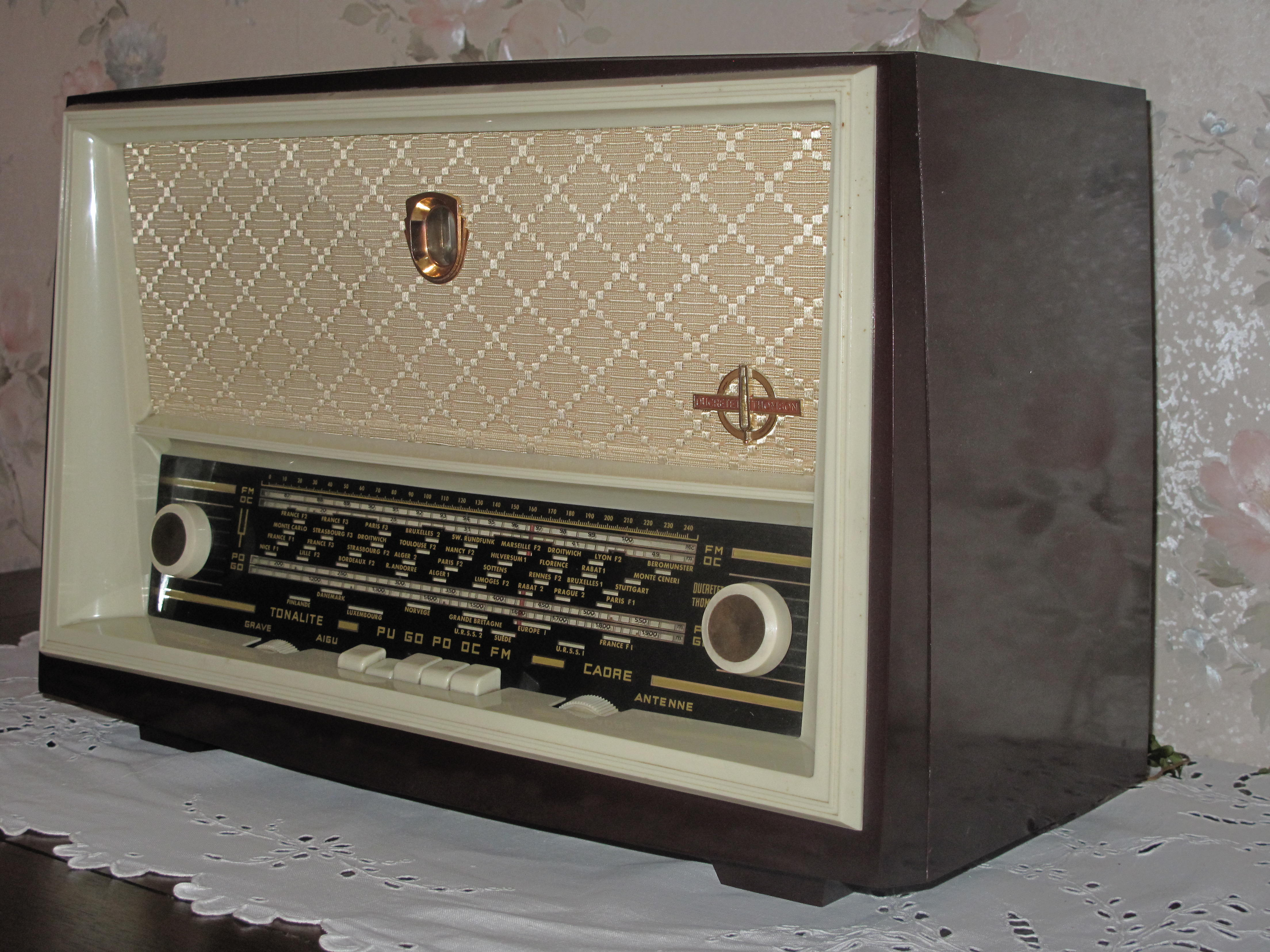
radio receiver Ducretet-Thomson, ca. 1955

Ducretet et cie., later Ducretet Thomson was a French company founded by scientist Eugène Adrien Ducretet which produced, among other scientific instruments, an early "plate phonograph", or tinfoil disc player (1879) and a tinfoil phonograph for cylinders. The company was later absorbed into the French Thomson Group and the division's product line extended to early televisions.

The company brand was also used for a record label until the end of the 1950s. The label eventually became part of London Records.

French label that was introduced in 1950 by Compagnie Française Thomson-Houston and Maurice Selmer of Henri Selmer Paris and the Selmer label. CFTH were a manufacturer of radios.

In 1958 Compagnie Française Thomson-Houston went into a partnership with Pathe Marconi, with the companies distributing each other's products.

Eventually Les Industries Musicales Et Electriques Pathé Marconi [EMI] took over the label in 1961.

The "Ducretet" part of the name comes from "Ducretet et cie." a company that CFTH acquired in 1929. Ducretet et cie. was a French company founded by scientist Eugène Adrien Ducretet which produced, among other scientific instruments, an early "plate phonograph", or tinfoil disc player (1879) and a tinfoil phonograph for cylinders. The repertoire focused on world music, including UNESCO recordings.

Today back catalog is owned by Warner Music France [Warner Music Group].
