= Worldwide Winners =

Annual British awards celebration

Worldwide Awards
- Awarded for: Excellence in music
- Sponsored by: Worldwide FM; BBC Radio 6 BBC Radio 1 (former)
- Venue: KOKO (2010-)
- Country: United Kingdom
- Presented by: Gilles Peterson
- Formerly called: Worldwide Winners
- First award: 1999 (First ceremony: 2004)

The Worldwide Awards, formerly known as the Worldwide Winner Awards, are an annual awards celebration curated by radio DJ Gilles Peterson and currently hosted by Worldwide FM and Radio 6 which celebrates up-and-coming musicians on an international scale. The ceremony evolved out of an annual segment on Peterson's BBC Radio 1 show Worldwide during which listeners would vote on a list of Worldwide Winners.

== History ==
Worldwide Winners was begun by radio and club DJ Gilles Peterson during his tenure on BBC Radio 1. In 1998, he brought his show Worldwide to the station and began a quarterly radio segment called All Winners Special in which he replays what he considered the previous few months' best new tracks from out DJing or the show. At the end of the year, these winners, plus a few further favourites that may have been overlooked, were compiled into a longlist. Listeners of the show then get to vote this longlist down to a shortlist of ten Worldwide Winners in each section which Peterson plays over the last couple of editions of his radioshow at the end of the year.

Worldwide Winners has been compiled in various forms at the end of every year since 1998 to present, though the first few years did not involve any public vote. From 2004 onwards, this has been expanded into the Worldwide Winners Awards, now called the Worldwide Awards, with an event held at a London club venue during January of the following year. The celebration, which features live musical performances, was recorded and broadcast by Radio 1. When Peterson moved to BBC Radio 6 in 2012, the show followed him there. The show is also promoted on Peterson's independent online radio platform Worldwide FM.

For most of the ceremony's history, Track of the Year and Album of the Year has been awarded. Further categories were added over time, like Best Clubnight, Best Recordshop, Best Compilation Album, and The John Peel Play More Jazz Award (a tribute to Peterson's Radio 1 colleague who died suddenly in 2004) given to an artist, often a newcomer, who has displayed special noteworthy work over the year. Since 2017, the categories have been: Track of the Year, Album Of The Year, Jazz Album of the Year, Breakthrough Artist of the Year, Session of the Year, Label of the Year, Lifetime Achievement Award, John Peel Play More Jazz Award.

=== Ceremonies ===
A ceremony has taken place for the Worldwide Awards from 2004 onwards.

Ceremonies, with details
Year	Date	Venue	Location	Ref.
2004	14 December 2004	Cargo	Shoreditch, London	
2005	12 December 2005	Koko	Camden, London	
2006	TBD			
2007	5 January 2008	Cargo	Shoreditch, London	
2008	23 January 2009	Cargo	Shoreditch, London	
2009	6 February 2010	The Garage	Islington, London	
2010	22 January 2011	Koko	Camden, London	
2011	21 January 2012	Koko	Camden, London	
2012	19 January 2013	Koko	Camden, London	
2013	18 January 2014	Koko	Camden, London	
2014	17 January 2015	Koko	Camden, London	
2015	16 January 2016	Koko	Camden, London	
2016	21 January 2017	Koko	Camden, London	
2017	20 January 2018	Koko	Camden, London	
2018	19 January 2019	Koko	Camden, London	
2019	January 2020	Digital only		
2020	Did not occur			

== Winners ==
=== 1999: 1st Year ===
Note: 1999-2002 charts were on just one list, singles, individual album tracks and whole albums.

1. The Cinematic Orchestra – Motion [Album] (Ninja Tune)
2. Mos Def – Umi Says (Rawkus Records)
3. The Underwolves – Under Your Sky [Album] (Island Blue)
4. Nitin Sawhney – Tides (Outcaste)
5. London Elektricity – Rewind (Acoustic Edit) (Hospital)
6. Ian Pooley – What's Your Number (Jazzanova Renumber) (V2)
7. Spacek – Eve (Island Blue)
8. Peshay – Miles From Home [Album] (Island Blue)
9. Terry Callier – Lifetime [Album] (Talkin' Loud)
10. Innerzone Orchestra – Programmed [Album] (Talkin' Loud)

=== 2000: 2nd Year ===
1. Jill Scott – Who Is Jill Scott? Words and Sounds Vol. 1 [Album] (Hidden Beach)
2. Saint Germain – Rose Rouge (Blue Note)
3. Hefner – Residue [Album] (Inertia)
4. MJ Cole – Sincere (Jazzanova Sincerely Yours Remix) (Talkin' Loud)
5. George Benson – The Ghetto / El Barrio (MAW Remix) (GRP)
6. Gotan Project – El Capitalismo Foráneo/Triptico (¡Ya basta!)
7. Jimi Tenor – Out Of Nowhere [Album] (Warp)
8. Lambchop – Up With People (Zero 7 mix) (City Slang)
9. Yonderboi – Pabadam (Mole Listening Pearls)
10. Kelis – Suspended (Virgin)

=== 2001: 3rd Year ===
1. Zero 7 – Simple Things [Album] (Ultimate Dilemma)
2. 4 Hero – Les Fleurs (Talkin' Loud/Mercury Records)
3. Roots Manuva – Run Come Save Me [Album] (Big Dada)
4. Herbert – Bodily Functions [Album] (!K7)
5. Gotan Project – La Revancha del Tango [Album] (XL Records)
6. Jazzanova – That Night (JCR)
7. The Cinematic Orchestra – Evolution (Ninja Tune Test)
8. Bugge Wesseltoft – Yellow is the Colour (Jazzland)
9. Suba – Samba Do Gringo Paulista (Zero db Remix) (SSR)
10. The Streets – Has It Come To This? (Locked On)

=== 2002: 4th Year ===
1. The Cinematic Orchestra – Every Day [Album] (Ninja Tune)
2. Jazzanova – In Between [Album] (JCR)
3. Drumagick – Easy Boom (Sambaloco)
4. Irfane – Just A Little Lovin' (White Label) [later remade and released under artist name, Outlines]
5. Raphael Saadiq (featuring Rosie Kaye) – Skyy Can You Feel Me (Universal)
6. Mr. Scruff – Trouser Jazz [Album] (Ninja Tune)
7. The Streets – Original Pirate Material [Album] (679 Recordings)
8. Seiji (featuring Lyric L) – Loose Lips (Bitasweet)
9. MAW (featuring Roy Ayers) – Our Time Is Coming (Jazzanova's Guestlist Mix) (MAW Records)
10. Vikter Duplaix – Looking for Love (Bugz in the Attic Remix) (Warner)

=== 2003: 5th Year ===
Note: 2003–present, switched to separate lists: Tracks - singles, individual album tracks / Albums - whole albums.

Tracks of the Year

1. RSL – Wesley Music (Players)
2. Cesária Évora – Angola (Carl Craig Remix) (BMG France)
3. Alison Crockett – Like Rain (Wah Wah 45s)
4. Pharrell – Frontin' (Star Trak)
5. The Rebirth – This Journey In (Kajmere)

Albums of the Year

1. Ty – Upwards (Big Dada)
2. Outkast – Speakerboxxx/The Love Below (Arista/BMG)
3. Matthew Herbert Big Band – Goodbye Swingtime (Accidental)
4. Madlib – Shades of Blue (Blue Note)
5. Erykah Badu – Worldwide Underground (Motown)

=== 2004: 6th Year ===
Tracks of the Year

1. Bugz in the Attic – Booty La La (V2)
2. Sa-Ra – Glorious (ABB Records)
3. Recloose – Dust (Peacefrog Records)
4. Sébastien Tellier – La Ritournelle (Source)
5. Sleep Walker (featuring Pharoah Sanders) – The Voyage (Especial)

Albums of the Year

1. Plant Life – The Return Of Jack Splash (Counterflow/Gut)
2. Troubleman – Time Out Of Mind (Far Out Recordings)
3. Kanye West – The College Dropout (Roc-A-Fella)
4. Jill Scott – Beautifully Human: Words and Sounds Vol. 2 (Hidden Beach)
5. Nicola Conte – Other Directions (Blue Note)

=== 2005: 7th Year ===
Tracks of the Year

1. Amerie – 1 Thing (Columbia/Sony BMG)
2. Steve Spacek – Dollar (Sound In Color)
3. Soil & "Pimp" Sessions – Waltz For Goddess (RCA Victor)
4. Switch – A Bit Patchy (Dub Sided)
5. Ben Westbeech – So Good Today (Brownswood Recordings)

Albums of the Year

1. Fat Freddy's Drop – Based On A True Story (Kartel Creative)
2. Common – Be (Geffen Records)
3. Platinum Pied Pipers – Triple P (Ubiquity)
4. Mark De Clive-Lowe – Tide's Arising (ABB)
5. Alice Russell – My Favourite Letters (Tru Thoughts)

=== 2006: 8th Year ===
Tracks of the Year

1. Nicole Willis & The Soul Investigators – Feeling Free (Timmion)
2. Bugz In The Attic – Sounds Like (V2/Nurture)
3. Simbad (featuring Steelo) – Soul Fever (Raw Fusion)
4. J Dilla (featuring Pharaohe Monch) – Love (BBE)
5. Gnarls Barkley – Crazy (WEA)

Albums of the Year

1. Bonobo – Days To Come (Ninja Tune)
2. J Dilla – The Shining (BBE)
3. Bugz In The Attic – Back in the Doghouse (V2/Nurture)
4. Paul Murphy – The Trip (Afro Art)
5. Marc Mac – Presents The Visioneers: Dirty Old Hip Hop (BBE)

=== 2007: 9th Year ===
Tracks of the Year

1. Benga and Coki – Night (Tempa)
2. Tawiah – Watch Out (Brownswood Recordings)
3. Sharon Jones & The Dap-Kings – 100 Days, 100 Nights (Daptone)
4. José James – Equinox (Brownswood Recordings)
5. United Legends (featuring Sleep Walker) – Thank You (Especial)

Albums of the Year

1. Theo Parrish – Sound Sculptures (Vol. 1) (Sound Signature)
2. Little Dragon – Little Dragon (Peacefrog)
3. Burial – Untrue (Hyperdub)
4. The Cinematic Orchestra – Ma Fleur (Ninja Tune)
5. Radiohead – In Rainbows (_Xurbia_Xendless/XL Recordings)

=== 2008: 10th Year ===
Tracks of the Year

1. Q-Tip (featuring Norah Jones) – Life Is Better (Universal Motown Records)
2. Black Pocket – U're A Sta (Martyn Remix) (Fat City Recordings)
3. Afefe Iku – Mirror Dance (Yoruba Records)
4. Morgan Zarate (featuring Eska & Ghostface Killah) – Sticks & Stones (unreleased)
5. Stacy Epps – Floatin' (JapaNUBIA Musik)

Albums of the Year

1. Erykah Badu – New Amerykah: Part One (4th World War) (Universal Motown Records)
2. Q-Tip – The Renaissance (Universal Motown Records)
3. Seun Kuti + Egypt 80 – Many Things (Tôt ou tard/Disorient Records)
4. José James – The Dreamer (Brownswood Recordings)
5. Benga – Diary of an Afro Warrior (Tempa)

=== 2009: 11th Year ===
Tracks of the Year

1. Joy Orbison – Hyph Mngo (Hotflush)
2. Floating Points – Vacuum Boogie (Eglo)
3. Maddslinky (featuring Tawiah) – Further Away (White label)
4. Shafiq Husayn (featuring Fatima) – Lil’ Girl (Plug Research)
5. Darkstar – Aidy's Girl Is A Computer (Hyperdub)

Albums of the Year

1. Mulatu Astatke & The Heliocentrics – Inspiration Information Vol. 3 (Strut)
2. Martyn – Great Lengths (3024)
3. Lee Fields – My World (Truth & Soul)
4. Quantic and his Combo Bárbaro – Tradition in Transition (Tru Thoughts)
5. Mos Def – The Ecstatic (Downtown)

=== 2010: 12th Year ===
Tracks of the Year

1. James Blake – CMYK (R&S)
2. Jay Electronica – Exhibit C (Decon)
3. Quest – Smooth Skin (Deep Medi Musik)
4. Cee-Lo Green – I Want You (Hold on to Love) (Original Jack Splash Mix) (White Label)
5. Jamie Woon – Night Air (Cadent Songs)

Albums of the Year

1. Flying Lotus – Cosmogramma (Warp)
2. Erykah Badu – New Amerykah Part Two (Return of the Ankh) (Universal Motown)
3. Four Tet – There Is Love In You (Domino)
4. Darkstar – North (Hyperdub)
5. Gil Scott-Heron – I'm New Here (XL)

=== 2011: 13th Year ===
Tracks of the Year

1. Adele – Rolling In The Deep (Jamie XX Remix) (XL Recordings)
2. Africa Hitech – Out In The Streets (Warp)
3. Julio Bashmore – Battle for Middle You (PMR Records)
4. Lovebirds (featuring Stee Downes) – Want You In My Soul (Winding Road)
5. Björk – Crystalline (Omar Souleyman Remix) (One Little Indian)

Albums of the Year

1. SBTRKT – SBTRKT (Young Turks)
2. Dimlite – Grimm Reality (Now-Again)
3. Thundercat – The Golden Age Of Apocalypse (Brainfeeder)
4. James Blake – James Blake (ATLAS/A&M Records)
5. The Stepkids – The Stepkids (Stones Throw)

=== 2012: 14th Year ===
Tracks of the Year

1. Andrew Ashong & Theo Parrish – Flowers (Sound Signature)
2. Ultraísta – Smalltalk (Four Tet Remix) (I Am Fortified)
3. Todd Terje – Inspector Norse (Smalltown Supersound)
4. Hackman – Forgotten Notes (White Label)
5. TNGHT – Higher Ground (Warp/LuckyMe)

Album of the Year

1. Stubborn Heart – Stubborn Heart (One Little Indian)
2. Frank Ocean – Channel Orange (Def Jam)
3. Kendrick Lamar – Good Kid, M.A.A.D City (Aftermath/Interscope)
4. The Invisible – Rispah (Ninja Tune)
5. Flying Lotus – Until the Quiet Comes (Warp)

=== 2013: 15th Year ===
Tracks of the Year

1. Lone – Airglow Fires (R&S)
2. Mount Kimbie – Made to Stray (Warp)
3. James Blake – Retrograde (1-800-DINOSAUR)
4. Chvrches – Recover (Cid Rim Remix) (Virgin)
5. Philip Owusu – Goodnight
6. Osunlade – Dionne (Yoruba Records)
7. Grandbrothers – Ezra Was Right
8. Tigran Hamasyan & LV - Road Song (Verve Music Group)
9. Omar – The Man (Freestyle Records)
10. DJ Rashad – Drums Please (Hyperdub)

Album of the Year

1. Jonwayne – Rap Album One (Stones Throw)
2. King Krule – 6 Feet Beneath the Moon (XL Recordings)
3. Myron & E – Broadway (Stones Throw)
4. Thundercat – Apocalypse (Brainfeeder)
5. John Wizards – John Wizards (Planet Mu)

=== 2014: 16th Year ===
Tracks of the Year

1. Flying Lotus (featuring Kendrick Lamar) – Never Catch Me (Warp)
2. Detroit Swindle (featuring Mayer Hawthorne) – 64 Ways (label?)
3. Little Dragon – Klapp Klapp (Swindle Remix) (label?)
4. Theo Parrish – Footwork (label?)
5. Clap! Clap! – Viajero (label?)
6. Martyn & Four Tet – Glassbeadgames (label?)
7. Karol Conka – Boa Noite (label?)
8. Jane Weaver – Don't Take My Soul (label?)
9. Nikitch – Radiated Light (label?)
10. Ibibio Sound Machine – Let's Dance (label?)

Album of the Year

1. Fatima – Yellow Memories (label?)
2. Jarrod Lawson – Jarrod Lawson (label?)
3. Chassol – Indiamore (label?)
4. Taylor McFerrin – Early Riser (label?)
5. BadBadNotGood – III (label?)

=== 2015: 17th Year ===
Tracks of the Year

1. DJ Khalab + Baba Sissoko – Tata (label?)
2. Pete Josef – The Travelling Song (label?)
3. Axel Boman – Nokturn (label?)
4. DJ Spinn + Rashad – Dubby (label?)
5. Kendrick Lamar – Alright (label?)
6. Ihsan Al Munzer – Jamileh (label?)
7. Floating Points & Maalem Mahmoud Guinia – Mimoun Marhaba (label?)
8. NxWorries – Suede (label?)
9. Point Point – Morning BJ (label?)
10. DVA & Addison Groove – Allyallrecords (label?)

Album of the Year

1. Kamasi Washington – The Epic (label?)
2. Hiatus Kaiyote - Choose Your Weapon (label?)
3. Kendrick Lamar - To Pimp A Butterfly (label?)
4. Jamie XX - In Colour (label?)
5. Matthew Halsall + The Gondwana Orchestra – Into Forever (Gondwana Records)

=== 2016: 18th Year ===
Tracks of the Year

1. Mélanie De Biasio – Blackened Cities (Play It Again Sam)
2. Moses Boyd – Rye Lane Shuffle (Exodus Records)
3. Yussef Kamaal – Strings of Light (Brownswood Recordings)
4. Sir Spyro (featuring Teddy Bruckshot, Lady Chann and Killa P) – Topper Top (Deep Medi Musik)
5. Minor Science – Naturally Spineless (label?)
6. Gabriel Garzon Montano – Sour Mango (label?)
7. Jimetta Rose – Skyscrapers (label?)
8. Shafiq Husayn (featuring Jimetta Rose + Fatima) – On Our Way Home (label?)
9. Kalbata – Al Shark (label?)
10. Kaytranada – Lite Spots (XL Recordings)

Album of the Year

1. Michael Kiwanuka – Love & Hate (Polydor / Interscope)
2. Gogo Penguin – Man Made Object (Blue Note Records)
3. Yussef Kamaal – Black Focus (Brownswood Recordings)
4. Jameszoo – Fool (Brainfeeder)
5. Sarathy Korwar – Day To Day (Ninja Tune)
6. Anderson .Paak – Malibu (Steel Wool / OBE / Art Club / EMPIRE)
7. Gregory Porter – Take Me to the Alley (Blue Note)
8. A Tribe Called Quest – We Got It From Here ... Thank You 4 Your Service (Epic)
9. BADBADNOTGOOD – IV (Innovative Leisure)
10. Carleen Anderson – Cage Street Memorial, The Pilgrimage (Freestyle Records)

Other awards

- Breakthrough Act: Noname
- Session of the Year: Lee Fields
- Label of the Year: Soundway Records
- Lifetime Achievement: Carleen Anderson
- Lifetime Achievement: Matthew Herbert
- John Peel Play More Jazz Award: Jameszoo

=== 2017: 19th Year ===
Track of the Year

- WINNER: Jorja Smith X Preditah – "On My Mind"
- Makadem & Behr – "Nyak"
- Kintaro – "MK" (feat. Anderson .Paak)
- Blood Wine or Honey – "Anxious Party People"
- The Heatwave – "Walk Out Gyal" (feat. Mr Lexx & Keida)
- BROCKHAMPTON – "FACE"
- IAMDDB – "Shade"
- Oscar Jerome – "Subdued"
- Arp Frique – "Nos Magia"
- Connie Constance – "Let Go"

Album of the Year

- WINNER: Sampha – Process
- Jordan Rakei – Wallflower
- Thundercat – Drunk
- Kendrick Lamar – Damn
- Juana Molina – Halo
- King Krule – The Ooz
- James Holden & The Animal Spirits – The Animal Spirits
- Matt Martians – The Drum Chord Theory
- Jane Weaver – Modern Kosmology
- Bonobo – Migration

Jazz Album of the Year

- WINNER: Ezra Collective – Juan Pablo: The Philosopher
- Kamasi Washington – Harmony of Difference
- Yazz – La Saboteuse
- Wildflower – Ahmed Wildflower
- Nubya Garcia – Nubya’s 5ive

Other awards

- Breakthrough Act: IAMDDB
- Session of the Year: Zara McFarlane
- Label of the Year: On the Corner Records
- Lifetime Achievement Award: Peter Zummo
- John Peel Play More Jazz Award: James Holden

=== 2018: 20th Year ===
Note: In press, it was noted that it was the 15th ceremony.

- Track of the Year: Abusey Junction – "KOKOROKO"
- Album of the Year: Khruangbin – Con Todo el Mundo
- Jazz Album of the Year: Kamasi Washington – Heaven and Earth
- Breakthrough Act: Slowthai
- Session of the Year: Jazz Special at Maida Vale with Joe Armon-Jones, Fatima, Nubya Garcia Hak Baker & Ishmael Ensemble
- Label of the Year: First Word Records
- Lifetime Achievement Award: IG Culture
- John Peel Play More Jazz Award: Ben LaMar Gay

=== 2019: 21st Year ===
- Track of the Year: Sampa The Great – "Final Form"
- Album Of The Year: The Comet Is Coming – Trust In The Lifeforce of the Deep Mystery
- Jazz Album of the Year: Ezra Collective – You Can’t Steal My Joy
- Breakthrough Artist of the Year: Greentea Peng
- Session of the Year: The Midnight Hour
- Label of the Year: International Anthem
- Lifetime Achievement Award: Jean-Paul ‘Bluey’ Maunick
- John Peel Play More Jazz Award: Thomas De Pourquery
