= Caoilfhionn Rose =

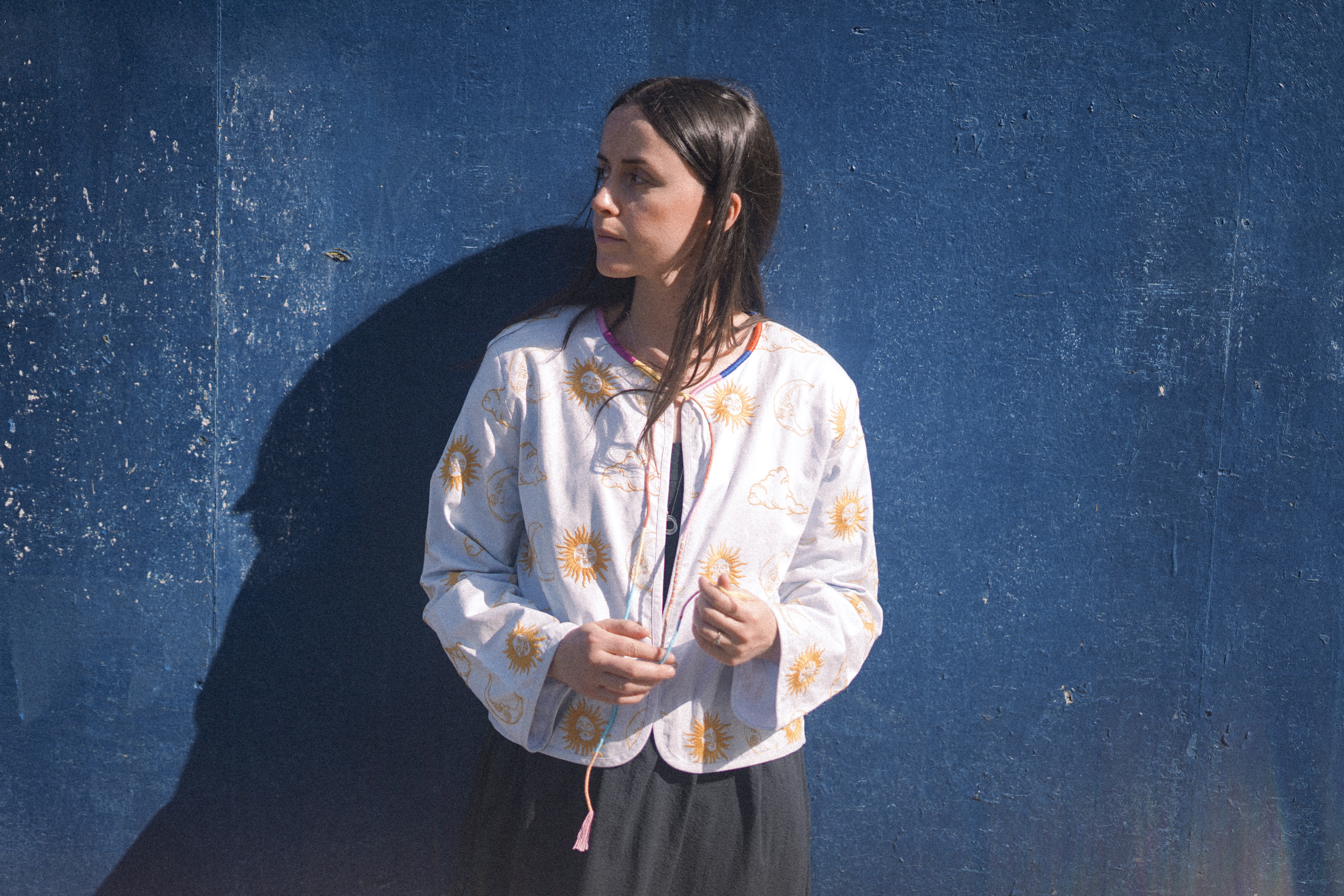

Background information
- Born: Caoilfhionn Rose Birley; 1993 (age 32–33); Manchester, England
- Genres: Folk; jazz; dream pop; psychedelic; folktronica
- Instruments: Vocals; piano; guitar
- Years active: 2013–present
- Label: Gondwana Records
- Website: www.caoilfhionnrose.co.uk

Caoilfhionn Rose Birley (born 1993) (/ˈkiːlɪn/ KEE-lin) is an English singer-songwriter and producer from Manchester. She signed with Gondwana Records in 2018 and has released three studio albums: Awaken (2018), Truly (2021) and Constellation (2024). She has collaborated with The Durutti Column, Slowly Rolling Camera and Svaneborg Kardyb.

== Early life and education ==
Rose grew up in Didsbury, south Manchester. Her mother is Irish. While deferring her university place, Rose studied at the Manchester Midi School (now the School of Electronic Music). She went on to graduate with a degree in Music from Newcastle University.

== Career ==
Rose self-released her debut EP Day Dreamer in 2013. She contributed vocals to Chronicle XL, a 2014 album by The Durutti Column, which featured the single "Free From All The Chaos".

Rose signed with Matthew Halsall's Gondwana Records and released her debut album Awaken in 2018. Awaken was named one of Bitter Sweet Symphonies' Albums of Year. The music video for its titular lead single was a God is in the TV Video of the Week. Her next singles were "Under the Night Sky", which received airplay on BBC Radio 6, and "Unravelled" in 2018, and "Look at You Now" and "Being Human" in 2019. She performed at Kendal Calling and Manchester International Festival.

In 2021, Rose released her second album Truly, co-produced by Keir Stewart of The Durutti Column. The album's lead single "Flourish" was a Clash Track of the Day. The other singles from the album were "Fireflies" and "To Me". Lisa-Marie Ferla of The Arts Desk described Truly as "vibrant, subtly strange". Rose performed at the 2022 Glastonbury Music Festival.

Rose's third album Constellation was released in 2024. The album featured musicians including Jordan Smart of Mammal Hands and John Ellis of The Cinematic Orchestra. She released the singles "Rainfall" and "Josephine". She also contributed to the Kessoncoda album Overstate. Rose's gigs included performing at the EFG London Jazz Festival in November 2024, where she opened for Brandee Younger, and at Manchester Folk Festival in March 2025.

In 2025, she released "Illusions", a collaboration with Danish jazz duo Svaneborg Kardyb and "The New Way" with Slowly Rolling Camera. She reunited with The Durutti Column for two tracks on the band's 2026 comeback album Renascent.

== Artistry ==
Rose described her early music as "folk-edelia". She grew up listening to The Mummers and called them her "favourite band ever". She praised songwriters Rachel Sermanni, Anais Mitchell, Polly Paulusma and Glen Hansard. Her other early influences include Melody's Echo Chamber and Broadcast.

With Constellation (2024), Rose's sound shifted towards jazz and ambient textures, with her core piano set against synths, saxophone embellishments, ambient samples and a live rhythm section. Reviewer Simon Smith wrote that the album saw Rose "branch out her sound into jazzier and ambient tones". Rose has cited The Cinematic Orchestra's 2007 album Ma Fleur as a key reference point for the record, particularly its blending of acoustic instruments with electronic textures. John Ellis, a former member of The Cinematic Orchestra, plays piano on the track "Fall into Place".

== Personal life ==
Rose is married to guitarist Rich Williams. She has bipolar disorder. In summer 2019 in the midst of making her second album, Rose fell ill and was hospitalised for several months.

== Discography ==
=== Studio albums ===
List of extended plays
Title	Details
Awaken	* Released: 2018: Label: Gondwana Records
Truly	* Released: 2021: Label: Gondwana Records
Constellation	* Released: 2024: Label Gondwana Records

=== EPs ===
- Day Dreamer (2013)
- Constellation Sessions (Live) (2025)

=== Singles ===
Year	Song	Album
2015	"Wild Anemones"	Awaken
2018	"Awaken"	Awaken
2018	"Unravelled"	Awaken
2019	"Look at You Now"	Awaken
2019	"Being Human"	Awaken
2021	"Flourish"	Truly
2021	"Fireflies"	Truly
2021	"To Me"	Truly
2024	"Rainfall"	Constellation
2024	"Fall Into Place"	Constellation
2024	"Josephine"	Constellation
2024	"Like Lightning / Dying Star"	—N/a

=== Collaborations ===
Year	Title	Artist(s)
2014	"Free From All The Chaos"	The Durutti Column
2024	"Greyscale"	Kessoncoda
2024	"The Sum of All the Parts"	Kessoncoda
2025	"The New Way"	Slowly Rolling Camera
2025	"Illusions"	Svaneborg Kardyb
2026	"Sargasso Sea"	The Durutti Column
