= Of All the Things =

Of All the Things may refer to:

- Of All the Things (album), a 2008 album by Jazzanova
- Of All the Things (film), a 2012 Filipino film
- "Of All the Things", a song by Stephanie Mills from the 1974 album Movin' in the Right Direction
