= Svaneborg Kardyb =

Danish musical duo

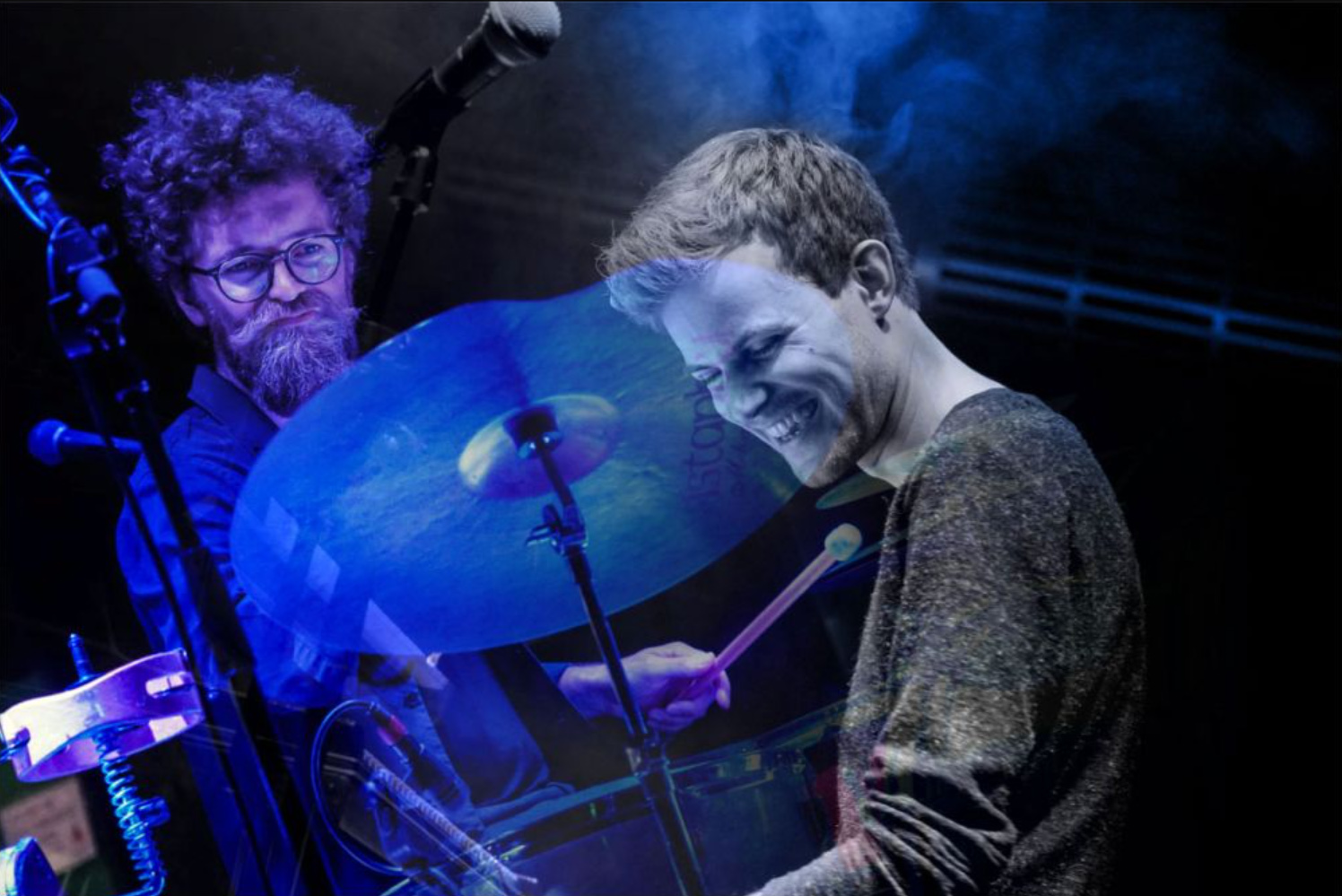
- Photo Hreinn Gudlaugsson

Background information
- Origin: Aarhus, Denmark
- Genres: Jazz, ambient, electronic
- Years active: 2018 – present
- Labels: BLIK FLAK; Gondwana Records
- Members: Nikolaj Svaneborg; Jonas Kardyb
- Website: svaneborgkardyb.com

Svaneborg Kardyb are a Danish electronic jazz duo, composed of Nikolaj Svaneborg (Wurlitzer, synthesizer, piano), and Jonas Kardyb (drums, percussion). Their music draws on Danish folk music and Scandinavian jazz influences. In 2019, they were awarded with two Danish Music Awards Jazz — for Talent of the Year and Danish Jazz Composer of the Year following the release of their debut album.

== Biography ==
Nikolaj Svaneborg and Jonas Kardyb met for the first time and discussed the possibility of starting a music project in 2013. In the next six years they both explored other projects and in 2019 they made a breakthrough on the music scene with their first full-length project 'Knob', released by the Danish indie-label BLIK FLAK.

Their second LP — 'Haven' (or the garden in English) — was released by the same label on 2020. It is described as a homage to nature. Their third album, 'Over Tage' (or over roofs in English), came out in 2022 and marks their debut for Gondwana Records — a label whose portfolio of artists includes bands as Mammal Hands, Portico Quartet and GoGo Penguin. For 'Over Tage' Nikolaj and Jonas quote Danish traditional songs, community singing and hymns as a big inspiration in the creative process of the album's ten tracks.

== Critical reception ==
The duo's music channels tangible Scandinavian jazz influences, including Nils Frahm, Esbjörn Svennson Trio and Jan Johansson.

Тhe musicians themselves say about themselves that they come from very different musical backgrounds: "Nikolaj from Scandinavian jazz, and Jonas from Roots, blues and folk, so the music is a sum of our personal contributions and doesn't thrive to be anything else than that."

Debra Richards, member of the DMA Jazz Academy, describes Svaneborg Kardyb's debut album 'Knob' as “the opposite of the fast, false world of social media and shallow ideals. The compositions are not flashy or driven by ego, they are simple, but very touching.” She praises the project for its delicacy of the playing, the natural affinity to melody and the exquisite interaction between Svaneborg and Kardyb.

Their music is an exquisite and joyful melding of beautiful melodies, delicate minimalism, catchy grooves, subtle electronica vibes. Nordic atmospheres and organic interplay, all underwritten by the sheer joy of playing together.

More Nils Frahm than Blue Note, the duo's music contains heavy Scandinavian jazz influences (think Esbjörn Svensson Trio, or Tord Gustavsen), pressing on the emotiveness of the music, translating the light percussive brushes and soft-palleted keys into a style of atmospheric yet contemplative, northern soul.

== Discography ==
Title	Details
Knob	Released: 1 March 2019; Label: BLIK FLAK; Format: Digital download, CD, LP
Haven	Released: 23 October 2020; Label: BLIK FLAK; Format: Digital download, CD, LP
Over Tage	Released: 4 November 2022; Label: Gondwana Records; Format: Digital download, CD, LP
Superkilen	Released: 18 October 2024; Label: Gondwana Records; Format: Digital download, CD, LP
