= V2.0 =

v2.0

Studio album by GoGo Penguin
- Released: 17 March 2014; 20 October 2014 (Deluxe)
- Recorded: April–August 2013
- Studio: 80 Hertz (Manchester)
- Genre: Jazz, nu-jazz
- Length: 47:32; 61:18 (Deluxe)
- Label: Gondwana Records
- Producer: Matthew Halsall, Joseph Reiser & Brendan Williams

GoGo Penguin chronology
Fanfares (2012)	v2.0 (2014)	Man Made Object (2016)

Professional ratings
Review scores
Source	Rating
All About Jazz	4.5/5 stars

v2.0 is the second studio album by jazz piano trio GoGo Penguin, released in 2014. The title is an allusion to an abbreviation commonly used in software versioning.

== Critical reception ==
About v2.0, Bruce Lindsay says in All About Jazz that "v2.0 is the sound of a band moving forward—not in leaps and bounds, but in small steps. There's really no need to jump headlong into the unknown when the foundations set down on Fanfares were so strong. v2.0 builds on those foundations with style, further establishing GoGo Penguin as one of the most exciting young bands on the contemporary scene."

This album was nominated for the Mercury Prize in 2014.

== Track listing ==
Gondwana Records – GONDCD009DD & GONDLP009:

All music is composed by GoGo Penguin.

No.	Title	Length
1.	"Murmuration"	4:13
2.	"Garden Dog Barbecue"	3:45
3.	"Kamaloka"	5:21
4.	"Fort"	3:17
5.	"One Percent"	5:36
6.	"Home"	5:22
7.	"The Letter"	6:14
8.	"To Drown in You"	6:28
9.	"Shock and Awe"	3:13
10.	"Hopopono"	3:55
Total length:		47:32

v2.0 – Deluxe Edition
No.	Title	Length
11.	"Break"	4:29
12.	"In Amber"	5:44
13.	"Wash"	3:33
Total length:		61:18

== Personnel ==
- Chris Illingworth – Piano
- Nick Blacka – Bass guitar
- Rob Turner – drums
