= Fanfares (album) =

Studio album by GoGo Penguin
- Released: CD: 19 November 2012; Vinyl: 14 March 2014
- Recorded: January 2012 at the Lodge Recording Studio
- Genre: Jazz; nu-jazz
- Length: 35:11
- Label: Gondwana Records

GoGo Penguin chronology
Fanfares (2012)	v2.0 (2014)

Professional ratings
Review scores
Source	Rating
All About Jazz	5/5 stars
The Guardian	3/5 stars

Fanfares is the debut studio album by the English jazz fusion trio GoGo Penguin, released in 2012. The following year, it was nominated for best jazz album at the Worldwide Awards.

== Track listing ==
Gondwana Records – GONDCD008 & GONDLP008:

All music is composed by GoGo Penguin

No.	Title	Length
1.	"Seven Sons of Björn"	5:17
2.	"Last Words"	3:05
3.	"Unconditional"	5:15
4.	"Fanfares"	4:53
5.	"I Am That"	4:05
6.	"Akasthesia"	6:01
7.	"HF"	6:36
Total length:		35:11

== Personnel ==
- Chris Illingworth – piano
- Grant Russell – double bass
- Rob Turner – drums
