= A Bit Patchy =

Single by Switch
- Released: October 2005 (dance clubs and DJs); September 2006 (charts)
- Genre: Reggae fusion; house; electro
- Length: 6:32
- Label: Dubsided
- Songwriter: Switch

Switch singles chronology
"Just Bounce 2 This" (2005)	"A Bit Patchy" (2005)	"I Still Love You" (2011)

"A Bit Patchy" is a single by English DJ Switch. It is based on the 1973 recording of "Apache", by Incredible Bongo Band. It was first released at the end of 2005 in discos and dance clubs, before arriving to the charts in 2006.

The song was then remixed by various artists, including Eric Prydz, Sinden and Sub Focus.

== Charts ==
The single peaked at No. 11 in Spain for a week on 24 September 2006. In the UK, it appeared in the charts on 16 December 2006, peaking at number 103.

Chart	Peak position
Spain (PROMUSICAE)	11

== Reception ==
On 2 October 2005, Gilles Peterson rated "A Bit Patchy" the fourth best single in the Worldwide Tracks of the Year section of Worldwide Winners.

On 21 December 2005, Gregor Salto put the single in his top five dance singles of the year.

== In popular culture ==
The song was featured in the 2011 William Hill betting advert in the UK.

A remix of the song was part of the tracklist for Anastacia at the s.Oliver fashion show in Berlin, Germany on March 29, 2007.
