= Slowly Rolling Camera =

Welsh jazz band

- Origin: Cardiff
- Genres: Jazz
- Years active: 2013–present
- Label: Edition Records
- Members: Dave Stapleton; Elliot Bennett; Deri Roberts
- Past members: Dionne Bennett
- Website: https://slowlyrollingcamera.co/

Slowly Rolling Camera is a jazz band formed in Cardiff in 2013.

== History ==
Slowly Rolling Camera was formed in Cardiff in 2013 by Dave Stapleton (founder of Edition Records) as composer and keyboardist, Elliot Bennett as percussionist, Deri Roberts as producer, and Dionne Bennett as vocalist and lyricist. With this formation they released 2 albums (Slowly Rolling Camera in 2014 and All Things in 2016) and an EP (Into the Shadow in 2014).

Following the third album, Dionne Bennett left the group and the remaining three members in 2018 released an instrumental album: Juniper, followed by "Where the Streets Lead" in 2021, "Flow" in 2023, and "Silver Shadow" in 2024.

== Music style ==
The music style of Slowly Rolling Camera is a combination of jazz and trip-hop, with influences from The Cinematic Orchestra, Bonobo and Portishead, receiving good reviews since the release of their first album, produced by Andy Allan (producer also of Portishead and Massive Attack).

== Discography ==
=== Studio albums ===
- 2014: Slowly Rolling Camera
- 2016: All Things
- 2018: Juniper
- 2021: Where the Streets Lead
- 2023: Flow
- 2024: Silver Shadow

=== Extended play ===
- 2014: Into the Shadow

=== Singles ===
- 2022: Momentum - Slowly Rolling Camera, Verneri Pohjola
- 2023: Cue: State of Mind - Slowly Rolling Camera, Verneri Pohjola
- 2023: Renewal - Slowly Rolling Camera, Josh Arcoleo
- 2025: The New Way; Slowly Rolling Camera, Caoilfhionn Rose

=== Live ===
- 2016: London
