= Paul Randolph (musician) =

- Also known as: Randolph, L'Homme Van Renn
- Born: Paul V. Randolph; August 10
- Origin: Detroit, Michigan, United States
- Genres: Jazz, soul, blues, rock, funk, house, electronica
- Occupations: Musician, Singer, songwriter, producer
- Instruments: Bass guitar, guitar, drums
- Labels: Mahogani Music, Still Music, P-Vine, Sonar Kollektiv

Paul V. Randolph, a.k.a. "Randolph" is an American bass player, singer, songwriter, and producer from Detroit, Michigan. His musical style ranges from jazz, funk, soul, house, rock and electronica. He is best known as the vocalist for the German collective, Jazzanova. Randolph has performed with well-known musicians, including Tony Allen, Odetta, Alice Cooper, Amp Fiddler, Hubert Laws, Josh White Jr, Mark Farner and Nigel Hall.

== Early life and education ==
Randolph was born in Philadelphia, Pennsylvania. He and his family relocated to Sao Paulo, Brazil when he was six years old, where he learned to play guitar. He graduated from Central Michigan University with a degree in Marketing.

== Career ==
Randolph joined the Detroit-based New Orleans-style funk and blues band, Mudpuppy as lead vocalist and bassist, along with fellow Detroit musician, Amp Fiddler. The pair later performed and recorded as a duo. During this time, Randolph also released his first solo CD, This Is...What It Is" in 2004 on Kenny Dixon, Jr.'s Mahogani Music label. His second solo album, Lonely Eden was released in 2007, with contributions from Stephanie McKay and Waajeed.

Randolph's overseas travels with Amp Fiddler lead him to meet members of the group Jazzanova. Randolph was the lead vocalist on three singles from Jazzanova's 2008 album Of All The Things on Sonar Kollektiv, which peaked at number six on the Billboard Chart's Top Contemporary Jazz category. He also sang on the 2012 Jazzanova release, Funkhaus Studio Sessions (Sonar Kollektiv). He was named 2010 Artist of the Year by Real Detroit Weekly, Randolph has releases between 2012 and 2017 that include, "Chips 'n Chitlins" with Zed Bias; Isoul8 - "Stay- Stay-Stay" and "Waves of Love"; DJ Kawasaki (Japan)- "Where Would We Be"; BoddhiSatva (Africa)- "Soldier"; Mikael Delta (Greece) - "This Is The Place"; and Opolopo (Sweden)- "Sustain". In 2017, a duet written and produced for jazz singer Kathy Kosins - "Could You Be Me", and a collaboration with South African dance music producer Ralf Gum - "We Repeat".

In 2018, Randolph debuted the single "Heavy" from his third album In The Company Of Others, with remixes by British producer Ashley Beedle, and authored the song "It's Beautiful" for Jazzanova's The Pool album. In 2019, two of his productions as a solo instrumentalist "Will The Party Ever End" and "Dancing In The Moon Light" charted on the Smooth Jazz and Indie Soul charts. Randolph's production of "Put The Voodoo On Me" earned him a Grammy nomination, and his production of "What You Do To Me" garnered enthusiastic commercial recognition. In late 2019, Randolph was requested by Bob Ezrin to record bass and background vocals on Alice Cooper's "Breadcrumbs" EP. Shortly after these sessions he was hired as bassist and background singer for Mark Farner formerly of Grand Funk Railroad. His 2020 productions included two singles with jazz flutist Hubert Laws, as well as other solo releases and collaborative releases. The year 2021 yielded a call back and co-production with Bob Ezrin for the Billboard #1 Rock Album of 2021 Alice Cooper's Detroit Stories. In 2022, he sang and recorded bass for the America's Got Talent Golden Buzzer receiving 'Detroit Youth Choir' full length album, Rockspell.

In addition to his musical talents, Randolph is also a voiceover artist and session singer with SAG/AFTRA and has done national spots for McDonalds, and Corona Beer. In 2022, Randolph started his own record label Sun Temple Records, has charting productions and a schedule of future releases.

== Discography ==
=== Albums ===
- This Is... What It Is (Mahogani Music, 2004)
- Lonely Eden (Still Music, 2007)
- Echoes (Of Lonely Eden) (Still Music, 2010)
- Chipz 'N Chittlins w/ Zed Bias (P-Vine, 2012)

=== Singles ===
- "The Real Thang" – Van Renn (1993)
- "The Man" – Van Renn (1994)
- "The (Real) Love Thang" – L'Homme Van Renn (1995)
- "Luv + Affection" – L'Homme Van Renn (1996)
- "People Make The World Go Round" – Innerzone Orchestra
- "Sucker for a Pretty Face" – Trust Me – In The Red
- "On My Heart" – ISoul8 feat. Paul Randolph
- "I Love You" – As One feat. Paul Randolph
- "I'm Down" – As One feat. Paul Randolph
- "Don't Take It Personal" – Wahoo feat. Paul Randolph
- "Ruff N Tuff" – Tettory Bad
- "Let Me Show Ya" – Jazzanova feat. Paul Randolph
- "Lucky Girl" – Jazzanova featuring Paul Randolph
- "Dial A Cliche" – Jazzanova feat. Paul Randolph
- "Truth" – The Clonious feat. Paul Randolph
- "Shine Your Light" – Simbad & Paul Randolph
- "Joy Vibration" – Tomson feat. Paul Randolph
- "Magic" – John Arnold feat. Paul Randolph
- "Tower of Love" – Makoto feat. Paul Randolph
- "My Magic" – Zoetic feat. Paul Randolph
- "Stay, Stay, Stay" – ISoul8 feat. Paul Randolph
- "Waves of Love" – ISoul8 feat. Paul Randolph
- "Captain of Her Heart" – Kiko Navarro feat. Paul Randolph
- "I Human" – Jazzanova feat Paul Randolph
- "I'm Free" – Catz N Dogs feat. Paul Randolph
- "Soldier" – Boddhi Satva Paul Randolph
- "Luminous Stasis" – Dial 81 feat. Paul Randolph
- "Especially For You" – Rodney Hunter feat. Paul Randolph
