= A Humdrum Star =

Studio album by GoGo Penguin
- Released: 9 February 2018
- Recorded: 10–23 June 2017
- Studios: Low Four, Manchester, England
- Length: 50:41
- Label: Blue Note

GoGo Penguin chronology
Man Made Object (2016)	A Humdrum Star (2018)	GoGo Penguin (2020)

Professional ratings
Aggregate scores
Source	Rating
Metacritic	78/100
Review scores
Source	Rating
AllMusic	4/5 stars
Clash	8/10
The Line of Best Fit	9/10 stars
Tom Hull	B+

A Humdrum Star is the fourth studio album by the English band GoGo Penguin. It was released in February 2018 by Blue Note Records.

== Track listing ==
No.	Title	Length
1.	"Prayer"	2:54
2.	"Raven"	4:57
3.	"Bardo"	7:14
4.	"A Hundred Moons"	4:27
5.	"Strid"	8:10
6.	"Transient State"	5:59
7.	"Return to Text"	5:22
8.	"Reactor"	6:17
9.	"Window"	5:21

== Charts ==
Chart (2018)	Peak position
Austrian Albums (Ö3 Austria)	75
Belgian Albums (Ultratop Flanders)	46
French Albums (SNEP)	86
German Albums (Offizielle Top 100)	41
Dutch Albums (Album Top 100)	158
Belgian Albums (Ultratop Wallonia)	192
Scottish Albums (Official Charts)	69
UK Albums (Official Charts)	73
UK Album Downloads (Official Charts)	28
UK Jazz & Blues Albums (Official Charts)	1
UK Vinyl Albums (OCC)	33
US Top Jazz Albums (Billboard)	5
