= Worldwide FM =

Internet radio station

- London; Tokyo; Los Angeles; Berlin; Paris; Others; England
- Broadcast area: Worldwide

Programming
- Language: English
- Format: Freeform

Ownership
- Owner: Mistral Productions

History
- Founded: 2016
- First air date: 5 September 2016

Links
- Webcast: Listen Live
- Website: worldwidefm.net

Worldwide FM is a freeform internet radio service that highlights "underground music, culture and stories from around the globe." Founded in 2016 by DJ Gilles Peterson, longtime host of the BBC Radio program Worldwide, the platform features a rotating roster of international radio DJs and programming. As of 2020, Worldwide FM has a monthly audience of more than 400,000 listeners. In September 2022, it was announced broadcasting would be paused at the end of October 2022, something that never happened.

== History ==
Worldwide FM was launched in September 2016 by Gilles Peterson in partnership with Thris Tian (Thristian Richards) of Boiler Room and WeTransfer as an extension of Peterson's Worldwide brand. Test broadcasts took place earlier in 2016. In 2017, Peterson and Worldwide FM were awarded the Jazz FM Award for Digital Initiative of the Year.

Worldwide FM is part of an ecosystem of Peterson-led projects, many under the umbrella of Brownswood Music Ltd.; Worldwide FM is managed by Brownswood's content production company Mistral Productions. The platform works in collaboration with Peterson's Brownswood Recordings and Future Bubblers initiative with Arts Council England. It has also been a digital venue of the Worldwide Awards and worked with the Worldwide Festival. Worldwide FM is directed by the Brownswood Music team of Peterson, Simon Goffe, and Dan Moss, with co-founder Thristian Richards.

Of note, the platform shares the name of the Peterson-curated in-game radio station in Grand Theft Auto V, which was released in 2013. The station was updated in 2014, to coincide with the release of the Enhanced Edition of GTA V for the eighth generation of video game consoles. It was updated for a second time in 2021 for Grand Theft Auto Online, and included multiple exclusive tracks including the final MF Doom track, a collaboration with BadBadNotGood. In 2026, was returned the platform shares the name of the Peterson-curated in-game radio station in Grand Theft Auto VI, which was released in 2026.

As of 2021, the station regularly broadcasts from studios in London (WWFM's headquarters), New York, Mumbai, Seoul, Johannesburg, Brussels, Kyoto, Berlin, Los Angeles, Melbourne, Paris, Rio de Janeiro, Detroit, Tokyo, and Istanbul, among other cities.

In 2019, the company began a new round of funding through CrowdCube. In 2022, the station announced a pause in normal operations beginning November 2022 due to a need to find new financing options; Peterson remains as the sole host.

== Listenership ==
After launching in 2016, the station had 130,000 listeners a month. In January 2019, Worldwide FM reported 365,000 monthly listeners, of which 34% are based in the UK, 11% in Japan, 11% in the US, 7% in France and 7% Germany. A year later, this number had grown to over 400,000 listeners. Worldwide FM experienced a sharp rise in listenership during COVID-19 lockdowns, leading to about one million listeners in April 2020.

== Accolades ==
- 2017: Jazz FM Award for Digital Initiative of the Year
- 2017: ARIA for Best Online Radio Station
- 2020: ARIA for Best Commercial Promotion (nominee)
