= Matthew Halsall =

English jazz musician

- Origin: Manchester, United Kingdom
- Genres: Jazz
- Instrument: Trumpet
- Label: Gondwana Records
- Website: www.matthewhalsall.com

Matthew Halsall is an English jazz musician, trumpeter, composer, producer and founder of the independent jazz label Gondwana Records, based in Manchester.

== Biography ==
Halsall released his debut album Sending My Love in 2008, which was also the first release on his label Gondwana Records, followed by Colour Yes in 2009. Success came with his third album On the Go in 2011, awarded the Gilles Peterson Worldwide Winners Award, and nominated as best jazz act in the 2011 MOBO Awards.

In 2012 the fourth album Fletcher Moss Park was released, and in 2014 he released his fifth album When the World Was One with the eight-member group Gondwana Orchestra. This album was awarded iTunes Jazz Album of the Year 2014.

In 2015 Into Forever, and a remix of On the Go in 2016, were released. In 2019 he released Oneness.

2020's Salute To The Sun marks the debut of his new band, with young musicians from Manchester. The album draws inspiration from themes of ecology, the environment and harmony with nature.

Halsall released his latest album An Ever Changing View on 8 September 2023.

== Gondwana Records ==
Gondwana Records is an independent record label based in Manchester, UK. The label was founded in 2008 by Halsall and has released music by artists including Hania Rani, GoGo Penguin, Jasmine Myra, Caoilfhionn Rose and Portico Quartet.

== Music style ==
Halsall's music is inspired by the spiritual jazz of Alice Coltrane, Pharoah Sanders and Miles Davis, with trip hop influences following in the footsteps of The Cinematic Orchestra.

== Discography ==
=== Albums ===
==== Solo ====
- Sending My Love (2008)
- Colour Yes (2009)
- On the Go (2011)
- Fletcher Moss Park (2012)
- Oneness (2019)
- Salute To The Sun (2020)
- An Ever Changing View (2023)

==== Matthew Halsall & The Gondwana Orchestra ====
- When the World Was One (2014)
- Into Forever (2015)

=== EPs ===
- The Temple Within (2022)
- Changing Earth (2022)
- Bright Sparkling Light (2024)

=== Singles ===
- "Journey in Satchidananda" / "Blue Nile" (2015)
