= Of All the Things (album) =

Studio album by Jazzanova
- Released: October 21, 2008
- Genre: Nu jazz
- Length: 59:31
- Label: Verve Records
- Producer: Jazzanova

Jazzanova chronology
In Between (2002)	Of All the Things (2008)

Professional ratings
Review scores
Source	Rating
AllMusic	4.5/5 stars
BBC	favorable
Exclaim!	favorable
PopMatters	8/10 stars

Of All the Things is the second studio album by Jazzanova, released in 2008. It features guest appearances from Phonte, Paul Randolph, Ben Westbeech, Thief, José James, Leon Ware, Dwele, Joe Dukie, Pedro Martins, Azymuth, and Bembé Segue.

== Track listing ==
No.	Title	Length
1.	"Look What You're Doin' to Me" (featuring Phonte)	3:01
2.	"Let Me Show Ya" (featuring Paul Randolph)	6:27
3.	"I Can See" (featuring Ben Westbeech)	3:31
4.	"Lie" (featuring Thief)	4:32
5.	"Little Bird" (featuring José James)	6:05
6.	"Rockin' You Eternally" (featuring Leon Ware & Dwele)	4:43
7.	"So Far from Home" (featuring Phonte)	4:13
8.	"What Do You Want?" (featuring Joe Dukie)	4:47
9.	"Lucky Girl" (featuring Paul Randolph)	3:34
10.	"Gafiera" (featuring Pedro Martins & Azymuth)	2:40
11.	"Morning Scapes" (featuring Bembe Segue)	4:13
12.	"Dial a Cliché" (featuring Paul Randolph)	4:14

== Charts ==
Chart	Peak position
US Jazz Albums (Billboard)	13
