= John Wizards (album) =

Studio album by John Wizards
- Released: September 2, 2013
- Recorded: 2010–2013
- Genre: South African house, R&B, Shangaan electro, reggae, afropop, soukous
- Length: 43:57
- Label: Planet Mu
- Producer: John Withers

John Wizards is the first album by South African band John Wizards, released on 2 September 2013 on Planet Mu Records.

== Critical reception ==
Professional ratings
Review scores
Source	Rating
The Guardian	4/5 stars
PopMatters	9/10 stars
NME	7/10 stars
Pitchfork Media	7.4 stars on a 10 point scale
Drowned in Sound	8/10 stars
Clash (magazine)	8/10 stars
The Quietus	Positive
Mojo (magazine)	8/10 stars
Resident Advisor	4/5 stars

The album was met with critical acclaim. Metacritic, which assigns a normalised rating out of 100 to reviews from mainstream critics, reported an average score of 81 based on 16 reviews, described as "universal acclaim". The Guardian awarded the album four out of five stars, and placed the album at number 8 on its top 10 albums of 2013. Pop Matters praised the album, saying, "[John Wizards] create multiple moods and textures that flow seamlessly into one another without a single dull or unnecessary moment anywhere on this record." NME gave the album a 7 out of 10, describing John Wizards as "the most globe-trotting band you'll hear this year." The album was awarded 5th best album of the year at the Worldwide Winners awards in 2014. South Africa's PLATFORM magazine placed the album at number 33 on its best albums list, with writer Andy Petersen saying, "it feels vibrant and necessary in a way that not too many South African albums of late have managed to feel."

== Track listing ==
All lyrics are written by John Withers except where noted; all music is composed by John Withers except where noted

No.	Title	Length
1.	"Tek Lek Schrempf"	4:00
2.	"Lusaka by Night" (Vocals and lyrics by Emmanuel Nzaramba)	2:58
3.	"Limpop" (Vocals and lyrics by Emmanuel Nzaramba)	2:32
4.	"Muizenberg"	3:26
5.	"iYongwe"	2:49
6.	"Finally/Jet Up"	2:38
7.	"Maria" (Vocals and lyrics by Emmanuel Nzaramba)	3:46
8.	"Jabu Ley" (Vocals and lyrics by Emmanuel Nzaramba)	2:47
9.	"Jamieo"	2:10
10.	"Leuk"	3:46
11.	"Durvs"	1:34
12.	"I'm Still a Serious Guy"	2:50
13.	"Hogsback" (Vocals and lyrics by Emmanuel Nzaramba)	2:28
14.	"Lushoto"	3:28
15.	"Friend" (Vocals and lyrics by Emmanuel Nzaramba)	2:45
