= Necessary Fictions =

2025 studio album by GoGo Penguin

Studio album by GoGo Penguin
- Released: 20 June 2025
- Recorded: September–October 2024
- Studio: The Arch
- Length: 48:39
- Label: XXIM
- Producer: GoGo Penguin; Joseph Reiser; Brandon Williams

GoGo Penguin chronology
| Everything Is Going to Be OK (2023) | Necessary Fictions (2025) |

Singles from Necessary Fictions
- 1. "Fallowfield Loops" Released: 17 April 2025

Necessary Fictions is the seventh studio album by English jazz fusion band GoGo Penguin. It was released on 20 June 2025 via XXIM in LP, CD and digital formats. Necessary Fictions is preceded by the band's 2023 project, Everything Is Going to Be OK. The first single, "Fallowfield Loops", was released on 17 April 2025, alongside a music video directed by band members Chris Illingworth and Nick Blacka.

== Reception ==
Professional ratings
Review scores
| Source | Rating |
|---|---|
| All About Jazz | 4/5 stars |
| AllMusic | 3.5/5 stars |
| Clash | 7/10 stars |
| Mojo | 4/5 stars |

Clash rated the album seven out of ten and referred to it as the band's "most adventurous record to date," noting they "retain their understated, cinematic sound that quickly builds into expansive movements of arpeggiating piano riffs, razor-sharp drumming and fluid basslines."

The album received a three and a half star rating from AllMusic, whose reviewer Paul Simpson stated, "On Necessary Fictions, they frequently use modular synthesizers, though they often create tones that sound closer to acoustic than synthetic."

Mojo's Charles Waring described the album as "a love letter to their native south Manchester and its iconic brutalist architecture," and noted it as "genre-defying", giving it a rating of four stars.

All About Jazz gave it a four-star rating and opined, "Necessary Fictions is the sunny-day party that follows once everyone feels properly ready to celebrate. The band sounds exuberant when stomping the place down or warmly comfortable spinning a pretty melody with charming simplicity."

== Track listing ==
All tracks are written by Chris Illingworth, Nick Blacka, and Jon Scott, except "Forgive the Damages" (written with Daudi Matsiko) and "Luminous Giants" (written with Rakhi Singh).

Necessary Fictions track listing
| No. | Title | Length |
|---|---|---|
| 1. | "Umbra" | 3:11 |
| 2. | "Fallowfield Loops" | 4:44 |
| 3. | "Forgive the Damages" (featuring Daudi Matsiko) | 4:10 |
| 4. | "What We Are and What We Are Meant to Be" | 5:37 |
| 5. | "Background Hiss Reminds Me of Rain" | 1:39 |
| 6. | "The Turn Within" | 5:47 |
| 7. | "Living Bricks in Dead Mortar" | 2:52 |
| 8. | "Naga Ghost" | 5:23 |
| 9. | "Luminous Giants" (featuring Rakhi Singh and Manchester Collective) | 5:08 |
| 10. | "Float (Loi Krathong, 2003)" | 2:33 |
| 11. | "State of Flux" (featuring Manchester Collective) | 4:27 |
| 12. | "Silence Speaks" | 3:08 |
| Total length: | | 48:39 |

== Personnel ==
Credits adapted from the album's liner notes.

=== GoGo Penguin ===
- Chris Illingworth – piano, synthesizers, production, strings arrangement, artwork design
- Nick Blacka – double bass, bass guitar, synthesizers, production, cover photo
- Jon Scott – drums, production

=== Additional contributors ===
- Daudi Matsiko – vocals, guitar
- Rakhi Singh – solo violin, vocals, violins
- Rosemary Attree – violins
- Anna Tulchinskaya – violins
- Dylan Edge – violins
- Carol Ella – viola
- Alistair Vennart – violas
- Peggy Nolan – cellos
- Simon Turner – cellos
- Joseph Reiser – production, recording, mixing
- Brandon Williams – production, recording, mixing
- Tom Dring – engineering assistance
- Norman Nitzsche – mastering, vinyl cut

== Charts ==
=== Monthly charts ===
Monthly chart performance for Necessary Fictions
| Chart (2025) | Peak position |
|---|---|
| German Jazz Albums (Offizielle Top 100) | 2 |
