= GoGo Penguin (album) =

Studio album by GoGo Penguin
- Released: 5 June 2020
- Recorded: 16–27 September 2019
- Length: 43:45
- Label: Blue Note

GoGo Penguin chronology
A Humdrum Star (2018)	GoGo Penguin (2020)

Professional ratings
Aggregate scores
Source	Rating
Metacritic	81/100
Review scores
Source	Rating
AllMusic	4/5 stars
Loud and Quiet	8/10
MusicOMH	3/5 stars

GoGo Penguin is the fifth studio album by English band GoGo Penguin. It was released on 5 June 2020 under Blue Note Records.

== Critical reception ==
GoGo Penguin was met with "universal acclaim" reviews from critics. At Metacritic, which assigns a weighted average rating out of 100 to reviews from mainstream publications, this release received an average score of 81, based on 5 reviews.

== Track listing ==
All music is composed by Chris Illingworth, Nick Blacka and Rob Turner.

Gogo Penguin track listing
No.	Title	Length
1.	"1_#"	2:02
2.	"Atomised"	4:23
3.	"Signal in the Noise"	6:03
4.	"Open"	4:47
5.	"F Maj Pixie"	5:48
6.	"Kora"	5:34
7.	"Totem"	3:54
8.	"Embers"	3:00
9.	"To the N^{th}"	4:34
10.	"Don't Go"	3:40
Total length:		43:45

Japanese edition bonus track
No.	Title	Length
11.	"Petit_A"	4:24
Total length:		48:14

== Personnel ==
- Chris Illingworth — artwork, piano
- Nick Blacka — bass
- Rob Turner - drums
- Norman NItzsche — mastering
- Joseph Reiser — engineer, mixer, producer
- Brendan Williams — engineer, mixer, producer

== Charts ==
Chart performance for GoGo Penguin
Chart (2020)	Peak position
Belgian Albums (Ultratop Flanders)	83
Belgian Albums (Ultratop Wallonia)	200
French Albums (SNEP)	114
German Albums (Offizielle Top 100)	29
Swiss Albums (Schweizer Hitparade)	26
US Top Contemporary Jazz Albums (Billboard)	6
US Top Jazz Albums (Billboard)	19
