= In Between (Jazzanova album) =

Studio album by Jazzanova
- Released: July 2, 2002
- Genre: Nu jazz
- Length: 74:00
- Label: Ropeadope Records
- Producer: Jazzanova

Jazzanova chronology
In Between (2002)	Of All the Things (2008)

Professional ratings
Review scores
Source	Rating
AllMusic	4.5/5 stars
PopMatters	favorable

In Between is the first studio album by Jazzanova, released in 2002.

== Track listing ==
No.	Title	Length
1.	"L.O.V.E. and You & I"	7:48
2.	"No Use"	4:10
3.	"The One-Tet"	3:51
4.	"Fade Out"	0:40
5.	"Hanazono"	8:16
6.	"Mwela, Mwela (Here I Am)"	7:16
7.	"Keep Falling"	5:19
8.	"Cyclic"	0:48
9.	"Another New Day"	5:19
10.	"Place in Between"	1:23
11.	"Soon"	4:35
12.	"Dance the Dance"	8:23
13.	"Sub-Atlantic"	0:38
14.	"Glow and Glare"	5:51
15.	"E-Ovation"	0:19
16.	"Takes You Back (Unexpected Dub)"	5:36
17.	"Wasted Time"	3:48

== Charts ==
Chart	Peak position
US Top Dance/Electronic Albums (Billboard)	16
