= Man Made Object =

Studio album by GoGo Penguin
- Released: 5 February 2016
- Recorded: May–August 2015
- Studios: Giant Wafer Studios (Powys, Wales) & 80 Hertz (Manchester)
- Genre: Nu-jazz
- Length: 47:50; 61:57 (Deluxe)
- Label: Blue Note
- Producers: Brendan Williams, Joseph Reiser & Kerstan Mackness

GoGo Penguin chronology
v2.0 (2014)	Man Made Object (2016)	A Humdrum Star (2018)

Professional ratings
Review scores
Source	Rating
All About Jazz	4/5 stars
All Music	4/5 stars
The Guardian	3/5 stars
Pitchfork	7.5/10 stars

Man Made Object is the third album by jazz piano trio GoGo Penguin. It is their first of a three-album deal with the jazz label, Blue Note. Chris Illingworth, the band's pianist, has explained that the title of the album is partly inspired by his fascination with ideas of robotics, transhumanism, and human augmentation.

== Critical reception ==
In his review, John Fordham said in The Guardian that "It still feels like clubbing music, but plenty of house and techno fans might be surprised by how good at partying three closet-jazzers can be." Marcus J. Moore said in Pitchfork that "Man Made Object is tailor-made for laid-back enjoyment, to be consumed at a moderate volume without much fuss."

The album charted at number 72 on the UK Albums Chart in February 2016.

== Track listing ==
Blue Note – 0602547648341:

All music is composed by GoGo Penguin.

No.	Title	Length
1.	"All Res"	5:16
2.	"Unspeakable World"	4:44
3.	"Branches Break"	4:23
4.	"Weird Cat"	5:39
5.	"Quiet Mind"	4:24
6.	"Smarra"	6:21
7.	"Initiate"	4:47
8.	"GBFISYSIH"	3:22
9.	"Surrender to Mountain"	3:59
10.	"Protest"	4:45
Total length:		47:50

Man Made Object – Deluxe Edition
No.	Title	Length
11.	"Unspeakable World" (Matthew Herbert's Onc Workout)	6:00
12.	"Initiate" (Stray Remix)	3:34
13.	"All Res" (Dabrye Remix)	4:33
Total length:		1:01:57

== Personnel ==
- Chris Illingworth – piano
- Nick Blacka – double bass
- Rob Turner – drums

== Charts ==
Chart (2018)	Peak position
Belgian Albums (Ultratop Flanders)	74
Belgian Albums (Ultratop Wallonia)	124
Dutch Albums (Album Top 100)	120
French Albums (SNEP)	100
German Albums (Offizielle Top 100)	93
Scottish Albums (Official Charts)	89
Spanish Albums (Promusicae)	73
Swiss Albums (Schweizer Hitparade)	82
UK Albums (Official Charts)	72
UK Jazz & Blues Albums (Official Charts)	1
US Top Jazz Albums (Billboard)	10
