= John Wizards =

South African musical group

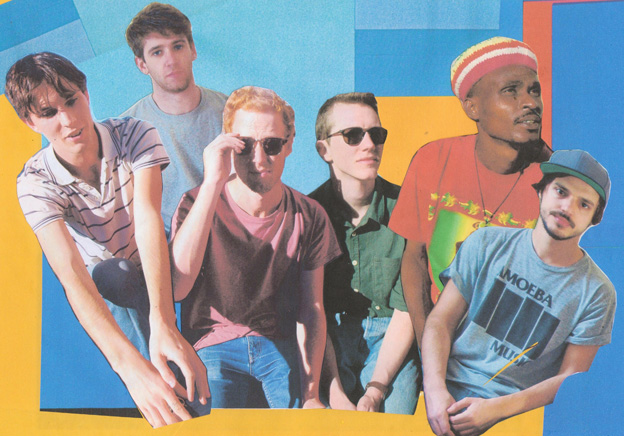
- (L–R) Geoff Brink, Tom Parker, John Withers, Alex Montgomery, Emmanuel Nzaramba, Raphael Segerman

Background information
- Origin: Cape Town, Western Cape
- Genres: South African house; R&B; Shangaan electro; reggae; Afropop; soukous
- Years active: 2010–present
- Label: Planet Mu
- Members: Geoff Brink; Tom Parker; John Withers; Alex Montgomery; Emmanuel Nzaramba; Raphael Segerman
- Website: johnwizards.com

John Wizards is a South African band from Cape Town formed in 2010. They are currently signed to Planet Mu Records. The band consists of vocalist and guitarist John Withers, vocalist Emmanuel Nzaramba, drummer and percussionist Raphael Segerman, bassist and keyboardist Alex Montgomery, guitarist Tom Parker and guitarist and keyboardist Geoff Brink. The band released its self-titled first album in September 2012, which includes the singles "Lusaka by Night" and "Muizenberg". The band's style has been described as a mix of R&B, soukous, Afropop, reggae, South African house, Shangaan electro and dub.

== Formation and signing ==
The band members of John Wizards mostly met either at school or at university. Three of the band members (Segerman, Montgomery and Brink) had previously performed with Withers on other projects. Thomas Parker, a mutual friend, would join the band several months after the others.

Withers met Nzaramba outside a coffee shop in 2010 and the two became friends. They subsequently fell out of touch for a period. In 2012 they happened upon one another in Cape Town and it turned out they were both living on that same street. Prior to their reacquaintance, Withers had been working on recording and producing the set of musical ideas that would later become John Wizards's self-titled release of September 2013. Nzaramba added vocal recordings to some of the songs and began to perform with the rest of the band. John Wizards released a mixtape, in August 2012, that roughly sketched out the songs on the album. This mixtape was passed on to Mike Paradinas, owner of Planet Mu records. Planet Mu would announce the band as part of their roster in November 2012, releasing the album ten months later.

== Discography ==
All released by Planet Mu

=== Studio albums ===
- John Wizards (2013)

=== Singles ===
- "Lusaka by Night" (2013)
- "Muizenberg" (2014)
- "Rwangaguhunga" (2022)
