= Mammal Hands =

British band

- Origin: Norwich, UK
- Genres: Jazz; minimalist; electronica; Folk
- Years active: 2012–present
- Labels: Gondwana Records, ACT Music
- Members: Jordan Smart; Nick Smart; Rob Turner
- Past members: Jesse Barrett
- Website: mammalhands.com

Mammal Hands are a British band from Norwich, consisting of Jordan Smart on saxophone, Nick Smart on piano and Rob Turner on drums.

== Description ==
Mammal Hands formed in Norwich, England, in 2012. They signed to Gondwana Records in 2013 and released their debut album, Animalia, in 2014. Their 2nd album, Floa, came out in 2016, followed quickly by Shadow Work in 2017. Their 4th album, Captured Spirits, was released in 2020 and their fifth studio album, Gift from the Trees, was released 31 March 2023, on Gondwana Records.

On April 26, 2024, the band announced the departure of their original drummer, Jesse Barrett, and subsequently announced that the band would be continuing with Rob Turner on drums.

On February 27, 2026, they released their 6th studio album, Circadia, on Berlin-based label ACT Music.

The band's style combines a broad range of influences, including ambient, jazz, contemporary classical, electronic music, minimalism, folk and world music.

== Discography ==
=== Studio albums ===
Title	Details	Ref(s).
Animalia	Released: September 15, 2014; Label: Gondwana Records; Format: Vinyl, CD, Digital download	
Floa	Released: May 27, 2016; Label: Gondwana Records; Format: Vinyl, CD, Digital download	
Shadow Work	Released: October 27, 2017; Label: Gondwana Records; Format: Vinyl, CD, Digital download	
Captured Spirits	Released: September 11, 2020; Label: Gondwana Records; Format: Vinyl, CD, Digital download	
Gift from the Trees	Released: March 31, 2023; Label: Gondwana Records; Format: Vinyl, CD, Digital download	
Circadia	Released: February 27, 2026; Label: ACT Music; Format: Vinyl, CD, Digital Download	

=== EP ===
Title	Details
Becoming	Released: November 2, 2018; Label: Gondwana Records; Format: Vinyl, Digital download
