= GoGo Penguin =

English jazz fusion trio

- GoGo Penguin logo

Background information
- Origin: Manchester, England
- Genres: Jazz; electronica; nu-jazz; ambient; experimental; minimalist
- Years active: 2012–present
- Labels: Blue Note (France); Gondwana (UK); XXIM Records
- Members: Chris Illingworth; Nick Blacka; Jon Scott
- Past members: Rob Turner; Grant Russell
- Website: gogopenguin.co.uk

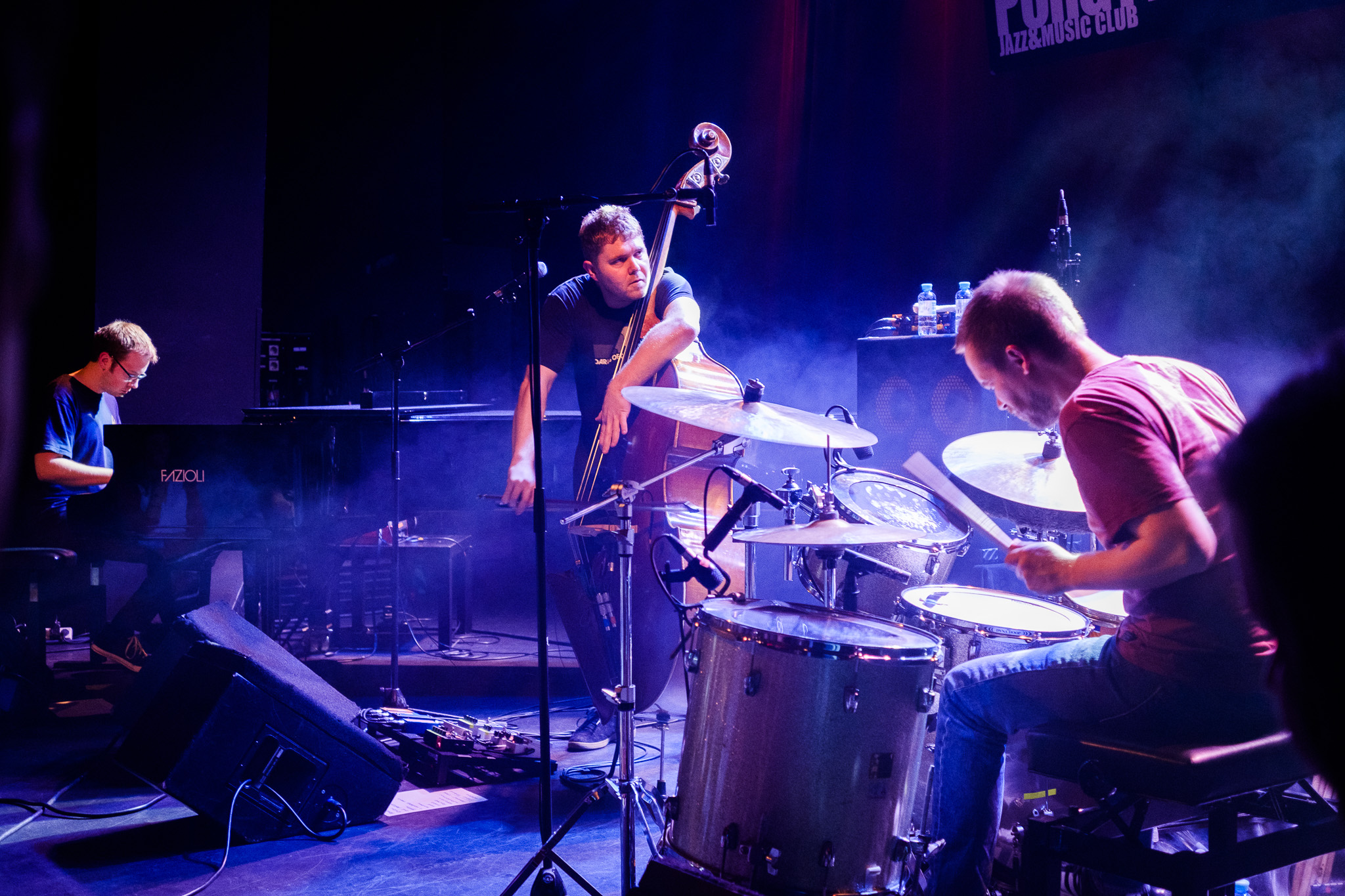
GoGo Penguin performing at Porgy & Bess in Vienna in November 2018

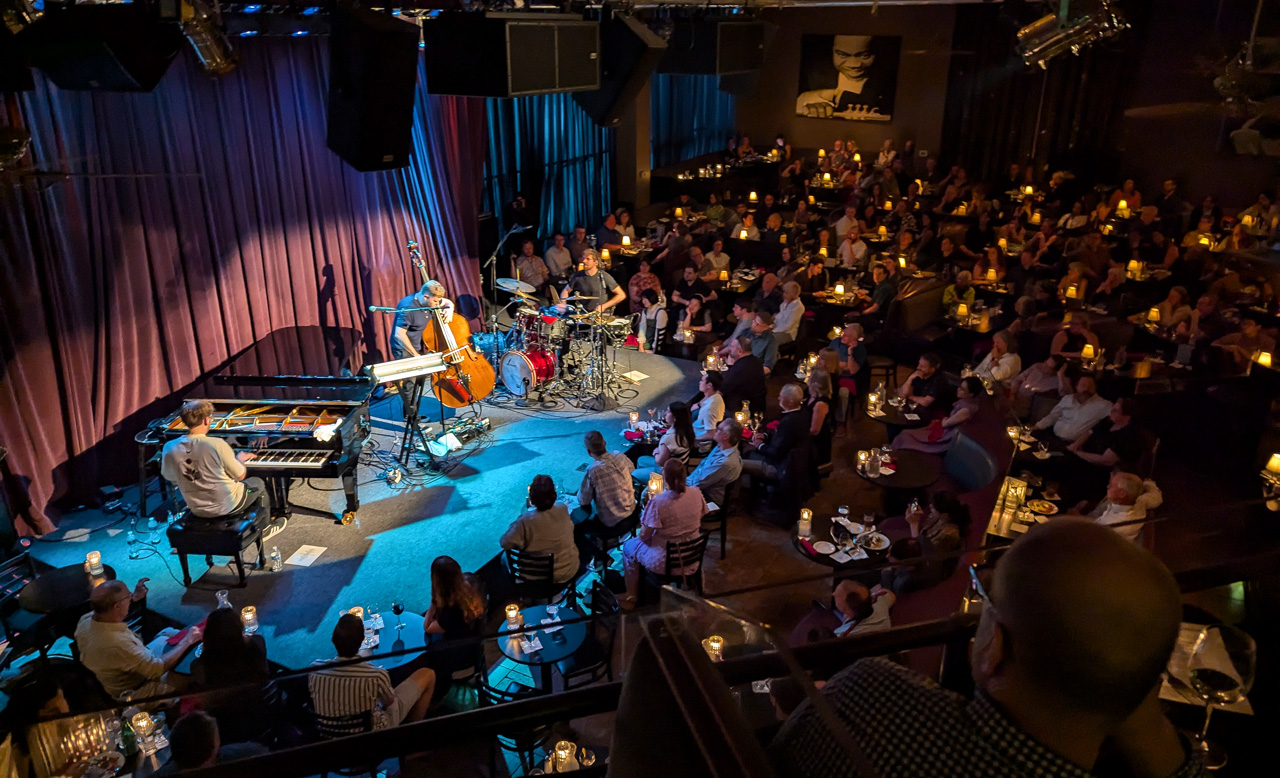
GoGo Penguin performing at Jazz Alley in Seattle in June 2024

GoGo Penguin are an English jazz fusion band from Manchester, consisting of pianist Chris Illingworth, double bassist Nick Blacka, and drummer Jon Scott. They formed in 2012 and, as of 2026, they have released seven studio albums, two EPs, and three live albums.

== History ==
GoGo Penguin formed in Manchester, England, in 2012. They released their debut album, Fanfares, the same year, to positive reviews. Their follow-up, v2.0, came out in 2014. In September 2014, it was shortlisted for the Barclaycard Mercury Prize as Album of the Year.

In 2015, GoGo Penguin signed to Blue Note Records. Their third album, Man Made Object, was published in 2016. They followed it in 2018 with A Humdrum Star. Their next record, which was self-titled, came out in 2020.

On 6 December 2021, the band announced the departure of their original drummer, Rob Turner, who was replaced by Jon Scott. Also in 2021, they released the album GGP/RMX and followed it with Everything Is Going to Be OK in 2023. Necessary Fictions came out in 2025.

== Musical style ==
The band's music features breakbeats, minimalist piano melodies, powerful basslines, electronica-inspired drums, and anthemic riffs. Their music also incorporates elements of trip-hop, jazz, rock, and classical.

Critics have compared GoGo Penguin to Esbjörn Svensson Trio, Aphex Twin, Squarepusher, Massive Attack, and Brian Eno, as well as modern classical composers Shostakovich and Debussy or contemporary minimal music composers like Philip Glass.

== Band members ==
Current

- Chris Illingworth – piano
- Nick Blacka – double bass
- Jon Scott – drums

Past

- Rob Turner – drums
- Grant Russell – double bass

== Discography ==
=== Studio albums ===
Title	Album details	Peak chart positions									
Title	Album details	UK	AUT	BEL (FL)	BEL (WA)	FRA	GER	NL	SCO	SPA	SWI
Fanfares	Released: 19 November 2012; Label: Gondwana; Formats: CD, LP, digital download	—	—	—	—	—	—	—	—	—	—
v2.0	Released: 17 March 2014; Label: Gondwana; Formats: CD, LP, digital download	—	—	64	—	—	—	—	—	—	—
Man Made Object	Released: 5 February 2016; Label: Blue Note; Formats: CD, LP, digital download	72	—	74	124	100	93	120	89	73	82
A Humdrum Star	Released: 9 February 2018; Label: Blue Note; Formats: CD, LP, digital download	73	75	46	192	118	41	128	69	—	79
GoGo Penguin	Released: 5 June 2020; Label: Blue Note; Formats: CD, LP, digital download	— (Note: GoGo Penguin did not enter the UK Albums Chart but peaked at no. 20 on the UK Albums Sales Chart.)	—	83	200	114	29	— (Note: GoGo Penguin did not enter the Dutch Album Top 100 but entered the Dutch Vinyl 33 chart at no. 12.)	40	—	26
Everything Is Going to Be OK	Released: 14 April 2023; Label: XXIM; Formats: CD, LP, digital download	— (Note: Everything Is Going to Be OK did not enter the UK Albums Chart but peaked at no. 33 on the UK Albums Sales Chart.)	—	—	—	— (Note: Everything Is Going to Be OK did not enter the France Albums Chart but peaked at no. 79 on the French Physical Albums Chart.)	54	—	33	—	—
Necessary Fictions	Released: 20 June 2025; Label: XXIM; Formats: CD, LP, digital download	— (Note: Necessary Fictions did not enter the UK Albums Chart but peaked at no. 39 on the UK Albums Sales Chart.)	—	—	—	— (Note: Necessary Fictions did not enter the France Albums Chart but peaked at no. 64 on the French Physical Albums Chart.)	—	—	68	—	58
"—" denotes a recording that did not chart or was not released in that territory.

=== EPs ===
Year	Album	Label
2019	Ocean in a Drop (Music for Film)	Blue Note Records
2022	Between Two Waves	XXIM Records

=== Live albums ===
Year	Album	Label
2016	Live at Abbey Road	
2020	Live from Studio 2	
2024	From the North: Live in Manchester	XXIM Records

=== Remix albums ===
Year	Album	Label
2021	GGP/RMX	Blue Note Records
