= Gilles Peterson =

British broadcaster and DJ (born 1964)

Gilles Peterson MBE
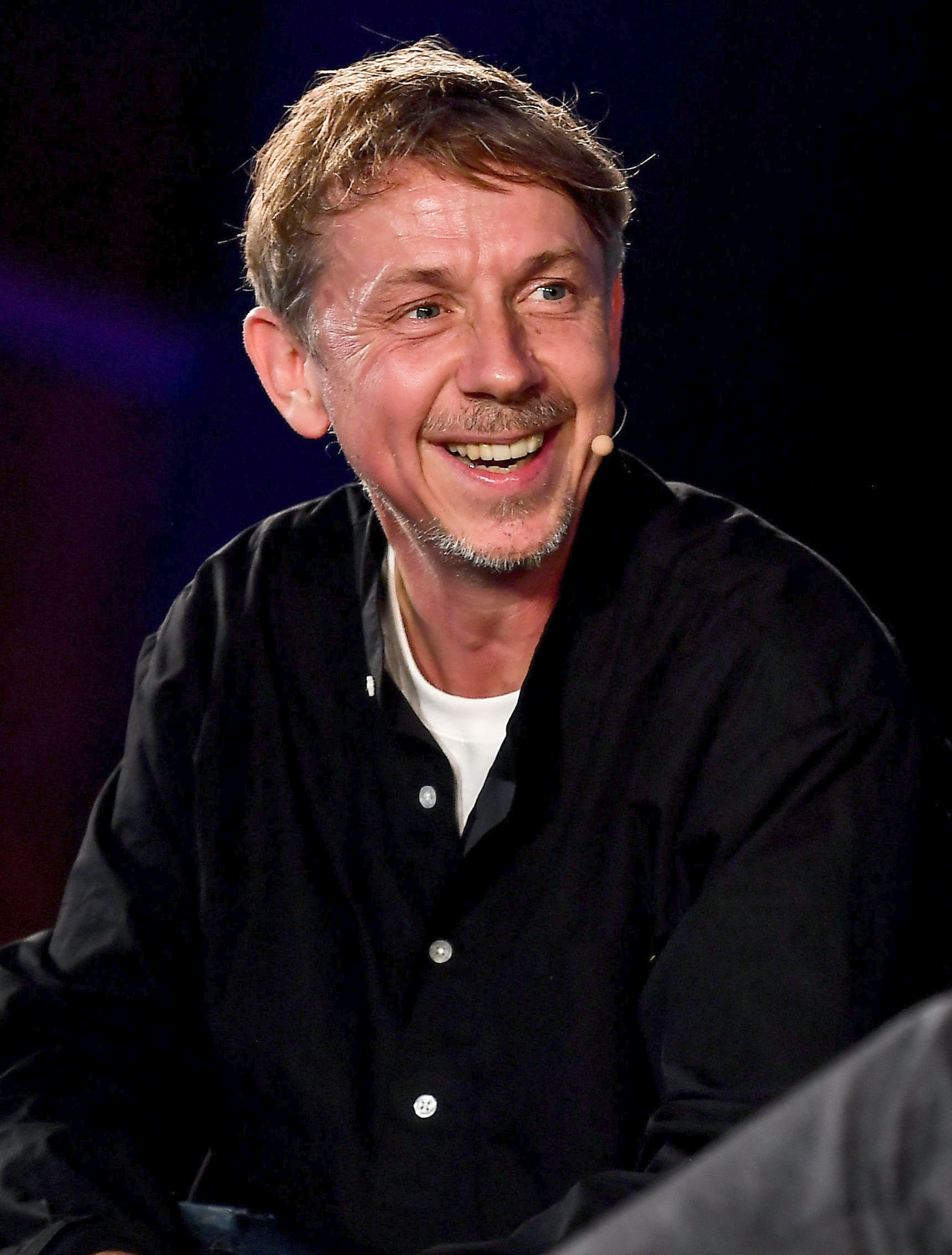
- Peterson at the 2019 Web Summit in Lisbon

Background information
- Born: Gilles Jérôme Moehrle; 28 September 1964 (age 62); Caen, Calvados, France
- Origin: London, England
- Genres: Acid jazz, hip hop, soul, electronic, world, breakbeat
- Occupations: Disc jockey, record label owner
- Years active: 1986–present
- Labels: Acid Jazz, Talkin' Loud, Brownswood
- Website: gillespetersonworldwide.com

Gilles Jérôme Moehrle MBE (French pronunciation: [ʒil ʒeʁom muʁl]; born 28 September 1964), better known as Gilles Peterson (/dʒaɪlz/), is a broadcaster, DJ, record label and festival owner. He is renowned for his genre-defying approach to music with jazz at its core. From this base he has systematically championed a whole range of music from across the globe moving from dance music to experimental and all points in-between.

== Career ==
=== Radio ===
Peterson was first heard as a DJ on London pirate station Radio Invicta. He spent his teenage years putting up radio transmitters for the pirates and playing on stations such as Horizon, K-Jazz and Starpoint. Brought up in the suburban South London soul scene, Peterson was exposed to a variety of music which shaped his future musical taste and broadcasting style.

He hosted Mad on Jazz on BBC Radio London in 1986–87 and became known on the London circuit as a DJ specialising in the new breed of "acid jazz", drawing on the jazz, funk, Latin fusions and Brazilian music of the 1970s.

In March 1990, Peterson joined London's first-ever dedicated jazz station 102.2 Jazz FM at its launch. He was dismissed from the station after playing anti-war songs and making anti-war comments during the first Gulf War.

Peterson then joined Kiss FM in 1991, the station having become legal the year before, where he remained until 1998 when he joined BBC Radio 1 with his Worldwide show, in which he presented a wide range of music helping audiences join the dots between different genres.

In late 2011, Peterson announced that, after 13 years at the station, he would be leaving Radio 1, following his last show in the early hours of 28 March and moving to a new show on BBC Radio 6 Music. Peterson started his new three-hour Saturday afternoon show on 7 April 2012, which continues to this day.

In 2013, Peterson launched Worldwide FM as an in-game radio station on Grand Theft Auto V. In 2016, it became a new global music-radio platform named Worldwide FM. From its inception until 2022, the station was powered by WeTransfer and broadcast from The Pyramid radio studios in north London. From the autumn of 2022, the station continued with Peterson's regular Thursday morning shows augmented by guest slots and takeovers along the way. He hosted Worldwide FM in the 2026 video game Grand Theft Auto VI.

=== DJ ===
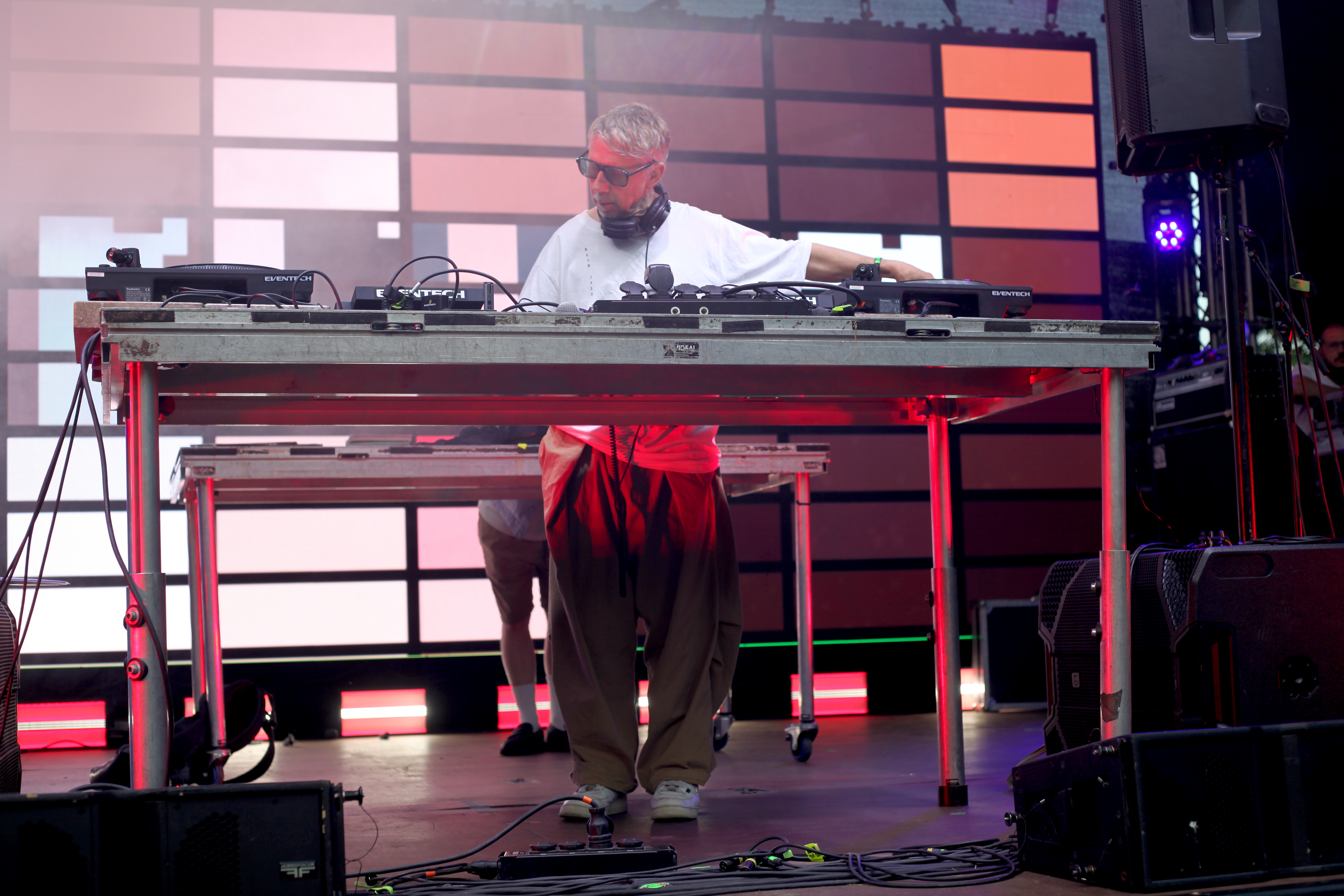
Gilles Peterson at the festival KiKuMu in Jäneda, Estonia (July 2026)

From his early teens, Peterson played at local South London wine bars and clubs as part of the burgeoning jazz funk scene. He then started playing back rooms and weekenders across London and the South East gaining inspiration from Manchester's legendary Berlin club, among others. These steps led to him becoming part of different scenes, including upstairs at the Electric Ballroom in Camden, the WAG Club in Soho and Special Branch in London Bridge, while putting on his own events in partnership with other DJs such as Chris Bangs.

Of these regular sessions, some of the most influential were the Sunday afternoon residency at Dingwalls in Camden, which runs to this day, the Monday night "That's How It Is" sessions at Bar Rumba, as well as Babylon at Heaven, Fez, Talkin Loud at the Fridge and his long association with Plastic People.

In addition to his UK activities, Peterson began playing regularly in Europe, with seminal residencies at Soul Seduction in Vienna and Beat Box in Wuppertal, as well as regular visits to Japan, Australia and America.

=== Record labels ===
Peterson's first foray into the label world was with Hardback Records and then BGP. After these formative experiences, in 1988 he started Acid Jazz quickly moving on to his Talkin' Loud imprint backed by Phonogram.

The label saw five of its artists nominated for the Mercury Music Prize, with Roni Size's Reprazent winning the award in 1997 for the album New Forms.

Peterson's current record label, Brownswood Recordings, was launched in 2006. The label has received a Mercury nomination for Ghostpoet's debut album, a BRIT nomination for Yussef Dayes' Black Classical Music which also won an Ivor Novello. The label is also known for its long running compilation series, compiled by Peterson, called Brownswood Bubblers and emerging talent series Future Bubblers.

=== Festivals ===
In 2006, Peterson worked with Freshly Cut, a French event production company from Montpellier, to create the Worldwide Festival, a small intimate festival during the summertime in the coastal town of Sète in France. It celebrated its nineteenth edition in 2024.

In 2018, in partnership with Ed Wilson of Brawn and Mercati Generali, Peterson launched the Ricci Weekender in Catania, Sicily, bringing together a unique mixture of music, DJs, food and wine, which celebrated its 6th edition in 2024.

In 2019, Peterson helped found a new festival, We Out Here, with New Bohemia. The title is taken from the 2018 Brownswood Recordings compilation album We Out Here. Originally taking place in Cambridgeshire, the festival celebrates the "elements and community of UK club culture and live music". In 2023, the festival moved to a new site in Wimborne St Giles, Dorset, where it continues to reside. Its 7th edition takes place over four days from 20 to 23 August 2026.

In 2024, Peterson launched Impressions in partnership with the Fondation Maeght in St. Paul-De-Vence, walking in the footsteps of Albert Ayler and Sun Ra, featuring spiritual music played in the Miro sculpture garden.

=== Projects ===
==== Steve Reid Foundation ====
Set up by Peterson in memory of American musician Steve Reid after his death in 2010, the Foundation aims to help musicians in need as well as to support emerging innovative voices in music.

==== Worldwide Awards ====
Initially known as Worldwide Winners in his BBC1 show, Peterson launched these awards in 2004 to celebrate the best in music throughout the year. Held in various London venues, the Awards ran until 2022.

==== Future Bubblers ====
Future Bubblers launched in 2015 as a talent discovery and development programme as part of Peterson's Brownswood Recordings and funded by Arts Council England. The focus has been on developing and supporting emerging music talent from the UK with annual releases. In 2023, a Future Bubblers academy was launched to nurture both future artists and industry professionals in tandem across the UK.

=== Publishing ===
==== Lockdown FM ====
In 2021, Peterson published Lockdown FM: Broadcasting in a Pandemic, a cultural documentation of a year in lockdown from his perspective and the community network of global music and culture platform, Worldwide FM.

==== Sounds of The Universe Album Artwork books ====
Peterson collaborated with Soho record shop and label Sounds of the Universe/Soul Jazz to produce a series of books that explored album artwork within key genres that he had collected and championed. These included "Freedom, Rhythm & Sound: Revolutionary Jazz Original Cover Art 1965-83", "Bossa Nova: and the Rise of Brazilian Music in the 1960s", and "Cuba: Music and Revolution".

== Personal life ==
Peterson was born in Caen, Normandy, France, to a French mother and Swiss father, and moved with his family to South London, England, during childhood. He is married with two children.

Awards

- Sony Gold Award – Best Specialist Music Radio Show (2000)
- Outstanding Contribution To Dance Music (2011)
- University of Nottingham – Honorary master's degree
- AIM Independent Music Awards – Indie Champion (2013)
- Mixmag – Outstanding Contribution To Dance Music (2013)
- Mixcloud – Best World Music Radio Show (2014)
- Jazz FM – Digital Initiative of the Year Award (2017) (awarded to Worldwide FM)
- Music Producers Guild – The A&R Award (2019)
- Trinity Laban - Honorary Fellow (2022)
- AIM Independent Music Awards - Outstanding Contribution to Music (2025)

== Discography ==
=== Compilations ===
- Jazz Juice (Street Sounds, 1985)
- Jazz Juice 2 (Street Sounds, 1986)
- Jazz Juice 3 (Street Sounds 1986)
- Jazz Juice 4 (Street Sounds, 1986)
- Baptist Beat (Blue Note, 1987)
- Jazz Juice 5 (Street Sounds, 1987)
- Jazz Juice 6 (Street Sounds 1987)
- Cal Tjader, Cal's Pals (BGP, 1987)
- Focus on Fusion (BGP, 1987)
- Focus on Fusion Volume 2 (BGP, 1987)
- B&G Party (BGP, 1988)
- Funk, Inc., Acid Inc. (The Best of Funk Inc.) (BGP, 1988)
- The Blackbyrds, Beat On (The Best of the Blackbyrds) (BGP, 1988)
- Dance Juice (BGP, 1988)
- Dance Juice Vol. 2 (BGP, 1988)
- Dance Juice Vol. 3 (BGP, 1988)
- Acid Jazz And Other Illicit Grooves (Polydor, 1988)
- Jazz Juice 7 (Street Sounds, 1988)
- Jazz Juice 8 (Street Sounds, 1988)
- Flora Purim, Milestone Memories (BGP, 1988)
- Azymuth, Jazz Carnival (The Best of Azymuth) (BGP, 1988)
- Acid Jazz Vol. 1 (BGP, 1988)
- Acid Jazz Vol. 2 (BGP, 1988)
- Acid Jazz Vol. 3 (BGP, 1988)
- Acid Jazz Vol. 4 (BGP, 1989)
- Jazz Today Volume 1 (BGP, 1989)
- Latin Jazz Volume 1 (BGP, 1989)
- Latin Jazz Volume 2 (BGP, 1989)
- Soul Jazz Volume 1 (BGP, 1989)
- The Best of Acid Jazz (BGP, 1989)
- Totally Wired (Acid Jazz, 1989)
- Totally Wired II (Acid Jazz, 1989)
- The Best of Latin Jazz (BGP, 1992)
- Make It Deep And Phunky (Blue Note, 1992) – Japan only
- Mo' Deep Mo' Phunky (Blue Note, 1993) – Japan only
- Brasil – Escola Do Jazz (EMI, 1994) – Japan only
- Brazilica! (Talkin' Loud, 1994)
- Talkin' Jazz: Themes From The Black Forest (Talkin' Loud, 1994)
- Talkin' Jazz Volume 2 (More Themes From The Black Forest) (Talkin' Loud, 1994)
- Jazz Juice #1 (Beechwood Music, Street Sounds, 1994)
- Jazz Juice #2 (Beechwood Music, Street Sounds, 1995)
- Jazz Juice #3 (Beechwood Music, Street Sounds, 1995)
- Talkin' Verve (Verve, 1995)
- Brazilica Volume II (Talkin' Loud, 1997)
- Talkin' Jazz Vol [III] (Talkin' Loud, 1997)
- Desert Island Mix (Journeys By DJ, 1997)
- Talkin' Louder Year on Year (Talkin' Loud, DJ Magazine, 1997)
- Free Style (Brownswood, 1998)
- INCredible Sound of Gilles Peterson (INCredible, 1999)
- Sound of the City Vol. 2 – London (Motor Music, 1999)
- Worldwide Programme 1 (Talkin' Loud, 2000)
- GP01 (Trust The DJ, 2001)
- GP02 – Eclectic (Trust The DJ, 2002)
- GP03 (Trust The DJ, 2002)
- Impressed With Gilles Peterson (Universal, 2002)
- Worldwide 2 Programme 2 (Talkin' Loud, 2002)
- A Journey to the Dawn (Temposphere, 2003)
- Broken Folk Funk Latin Soul (Muzik Magazine, 2003)
- GP04 – Eclectic (Trust The DJ, 2003)
- Eclectic Session Vol. 2 (Trust The DJ, 2003)
- Shibuya Jazz Classics – Gilles Peterson Collection – TRIO Issue (Solid, 2003)
- Southport Weekender (suSU, 2003)
- Worldwide 3 Programme 3 (Talkin' Loud, 2003)
- Gilles Peterson in Brazil (Ether, 2004)
- Impressed 2 With Gilles Peterson (Universal, 2004)
- Worldwide Exclusives (Talkin' Loud, 2004)
- Brasil – The Rhythm And Art of Movement (Nike, 2005)
- Gilles Peterson Digs America (Brownswood U.S.A.) (Luv N' Haight, 2005)
- Gilles Peterson in Africa (Ether, 2005)
- The BBC Sessions Vol. 1 (Ether, 2005)
- Petit Dejeuner Au Lit! (Most, 2005)
- Smell The Grass (Mixmag, 2005)
- Sunday Afternoon at Dingwalls with Patrick Forge (Ether, 2006)
- Back in Brazil (Ether, 2006)
- Pure Fire!: A Gilles Peterson Impulse! Collection (Impulse!, 2006)
- The Kings of Jazz with Jazzanova (Rapster, 2006)
- Brownswood Bubblers (Brownswood Recordings, 2006)
- Brownswood Bubblers Two (Brownswood Recordings. 2007)
- Gilles Peterson Fania DJ Series (Fania, 2007)
- Gilles Peterson Digs America 2 (Searching at the End of an Era) (Luv N' Haight, 2007)
- Brownswood Bubblers Three (Brownswood Recordings, 2008)
- In the House (ITH, 2008)
- Brazilika (Far Out Recordings, 2009)
- Brownswood Bubblers Four (Brownswood Recordings, 2009)
- Freedom Rhythm & Sound (Revolutionary Jazz & The Civil Rights Movement 1963–82) (Soul Jazz, 2009)
- Gilles Peterson Presents Havana Cultura: New Cuba Sound (Brownswood Recordings, 2009)
- Brownswood Bubblers Five (Brownswood Recordings, 2010)
- Brownswood Bubblers Six (Brownswood Recordings, 2010)
- Gilles Peterson Presents Havana Cultura: Remixed (Brownswood Recordings, 2010)
- Worldwide (BBE, 2010)
- Everyday Blue Note – Compiled by Gilles Peterson (Blue Note, 2010) – Japan only
- Heartbeat Presents One Time! Mixed by Gilles Peterson × Air (Lastrum, 2010) – Japan only
- Horo: A Jazz Portrait (Dejavu, 2010)
- Bossa Nova and the Rise of Brazilian Music in the 1960s (Soul Jazz, 2011)
- Masterpiece: Created By Gilles Peterson (Ministry of Sound, 2011)
- Brownswood Bubblers Seven (Brownswood Recordings, 2011)
- Gilles Peterson Presents Havana Cultura: The Search Continues (Brownswood Recordings, 2011)
- Black Jazz Radio (Snow Dog, 2012) – Japan only
- Brownswood Bubblers Eight (Brownswood Recordings, 2012)
- Brownswood Bubblers Nine (Brownswood Recordings, 2012)
- Brownswood Bubblers Ten (Brownswood Recordings, 2013)
- Brownswood One Hundred Remixed (Brownswood Recordings, 2013)
- Brunswick Bubblers (Octave Lab, 2014)
- Sonzeira, Brasil Bam Bam Bam (Talkin' Loud, 2014)
- Brownswood Bubblers Eleven (Brownswood Recordings, 2014)
- Brownswood's 20k Mixtape (Brownswood Recordings, 2014)
- Timeless Jazz Classic (Solid, 2015)
- Magic Peterson Sunshine (MPS, 2016)
- Gilles Peterson Presents Havana Cultura Anthology (Brownswood Recordings, 2016)
- Brownswood Bubblers Twelve (Brownswood Recordings, 2017)
- Brownswood Bubblers Thirteen (Brownswood Recordings, 2018)
- Brownswood Best of 2019 (Brownswood Recordings, 2019)
- Brownswood Best of 2020 (Brownswood Recordings, 2020)

=== Remixes ===
Selected credits

- Gregory Porter – "Liquid Spirit - Patchwork Peterson Remix" from The Remix EP (with Alex Patchwork)
- Mélanie De Biasio – No Deal Remixed (album contributor)
- Raphael Gualazzi – "Reality & Fantasy (Gilles Peterson Remix)"
- Nono Morales – "Saona" (Gilles P & Simbad Remix)
- Bukky Leo & Black Egypt – "Skeleton (Gilles P Winter Dub)"
- Chambao – "Duende Del Sur (Gilles Peterson Dub)"
- Ghostpoet – Survive It (Gilles Peterson Mix)
- Keziah Jones – "Lagos – NY (Gilles Peterson Remix)"
- Seu Jorge – "Burguesinha (Gilles P Re-Edit)"
- Tito Puente – "Watu Wasuri (Gilles P Re-Edit)"
- Louie Vega – "One Dream (Gilles Peterson Edit)"
- Laura Welsh – "Undiscovered (Gilles Peterson Remix)"
- Meshell N'Degeocello – "Friends (Gilles P & Simbad Remix)"
- Makaya McCraven – "Run 'Dem (Gilles Peterson Edit)"
- Lionel Loueke – HH Reimagined

=== Other credits ===
- Roberto Fonseca – Yo (co-produced tracks)
- Omar Souleyman – "Tawwalt El Gheba" (producer)
- Danay Suarez – Havana Cultura Sessions (Executive producer)

== Bibliography ==
Compilations edited with Stuart Baker

- Bossa Nova and the Rise Of Brazilian Music in the 1960s. London: Soul Jazz Books, 2011.
- Freedom Rhythm & Sound: Revolutionary Jazz Original Cover Art 1965–83 . London: Soul Jazz Books, 2017.
- Cuba: Music and Revolution: Original Album Cover Art of Cuban Music: The Record Sleeve Designs of Revolutionary Cuba 1960–85. London: Soul Jazz Books, 2021.
