= Jazzanova =

German DJ/producer collective

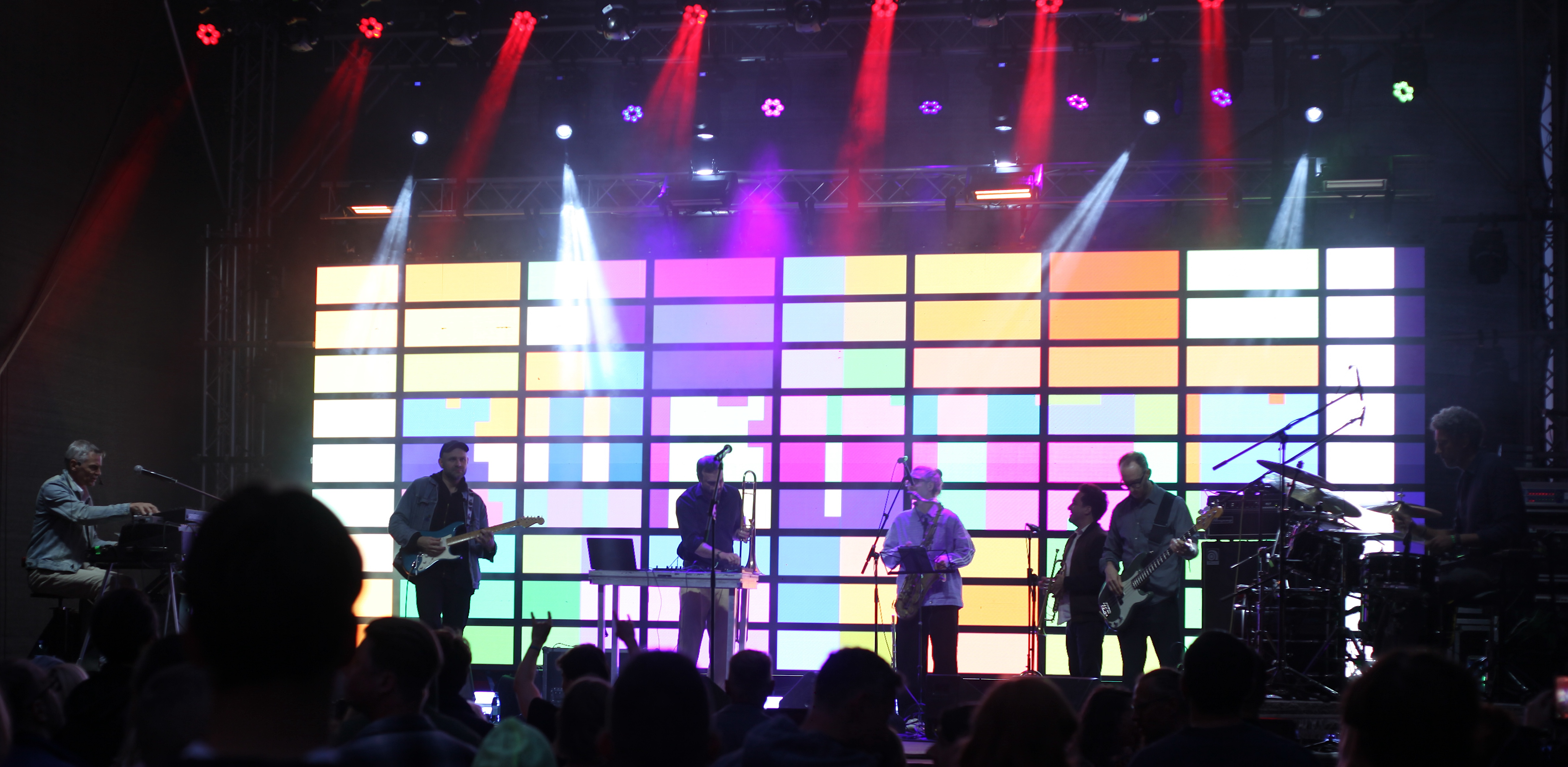
- Jazzanova performing at the festival KiKuMu in Jäneda, Estonia (July 2026)

Background information
- Origin: Germany
- Genres: Funk; downtempo; nu jazz; electronic; chill-out; soul house; latin jazz
- Years active: 1995–present
- Label: Sonar Kollektiv
- Website: jazzanova.com

Jazzanova is a German DJ / producer collective based in Berlin. They have collaborated extensively with other musicians.

== History ==
Formed in 1995 by Alexander Barck, Claas Brieler, Jürgen von Knoblauch, Roskow Kretschmann, Stefan Leisering, and Axel Reinemer, the group's music is characterized by nu jazz, chill-out, and Latin jazz styles. They founded the record label Sonar Kollektiv in 1997.

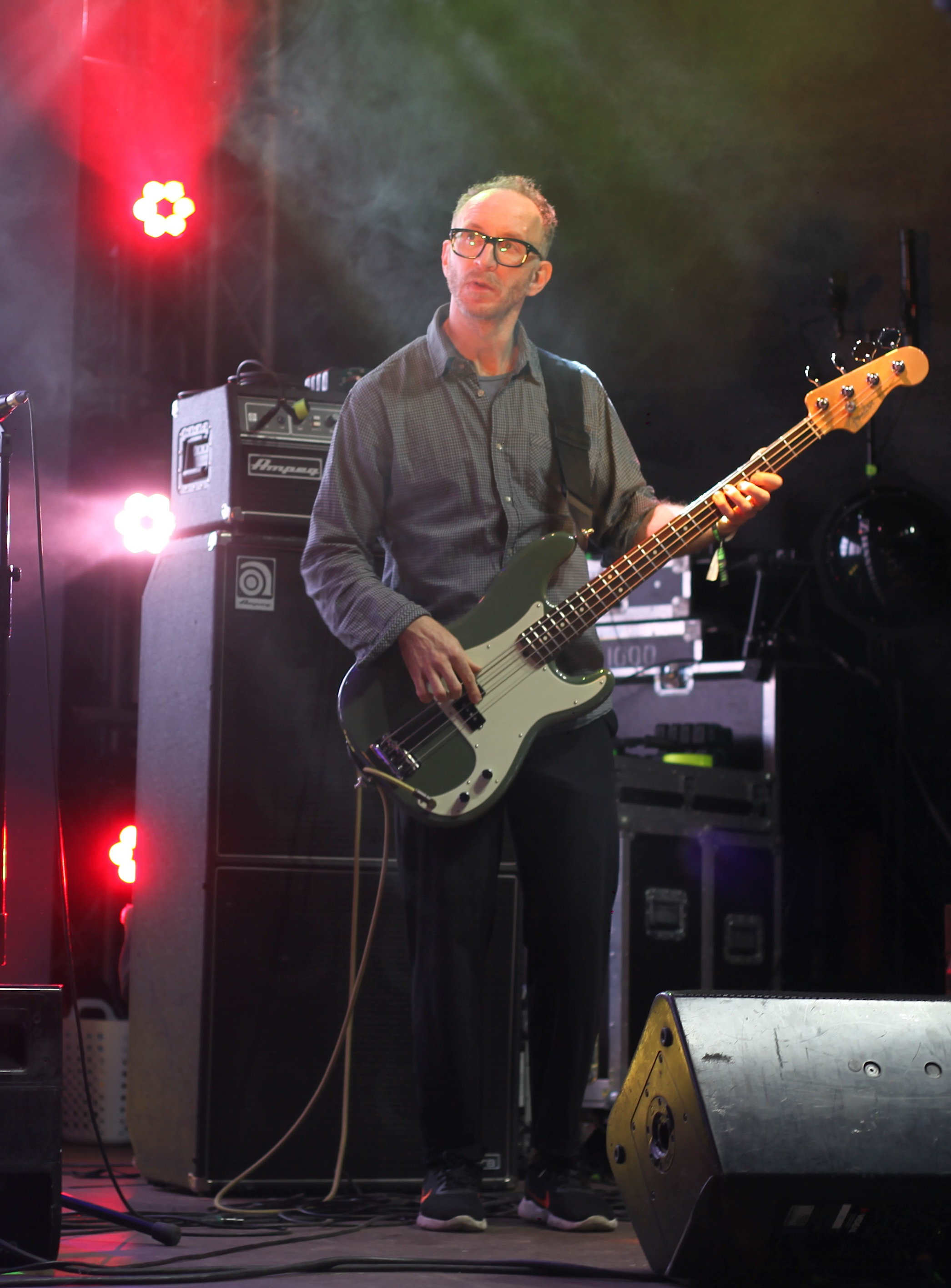
Bassist Paul Kleber performing with Jazzanova at the KiKuMu festival in Jäneda, Estonia (July 2026)

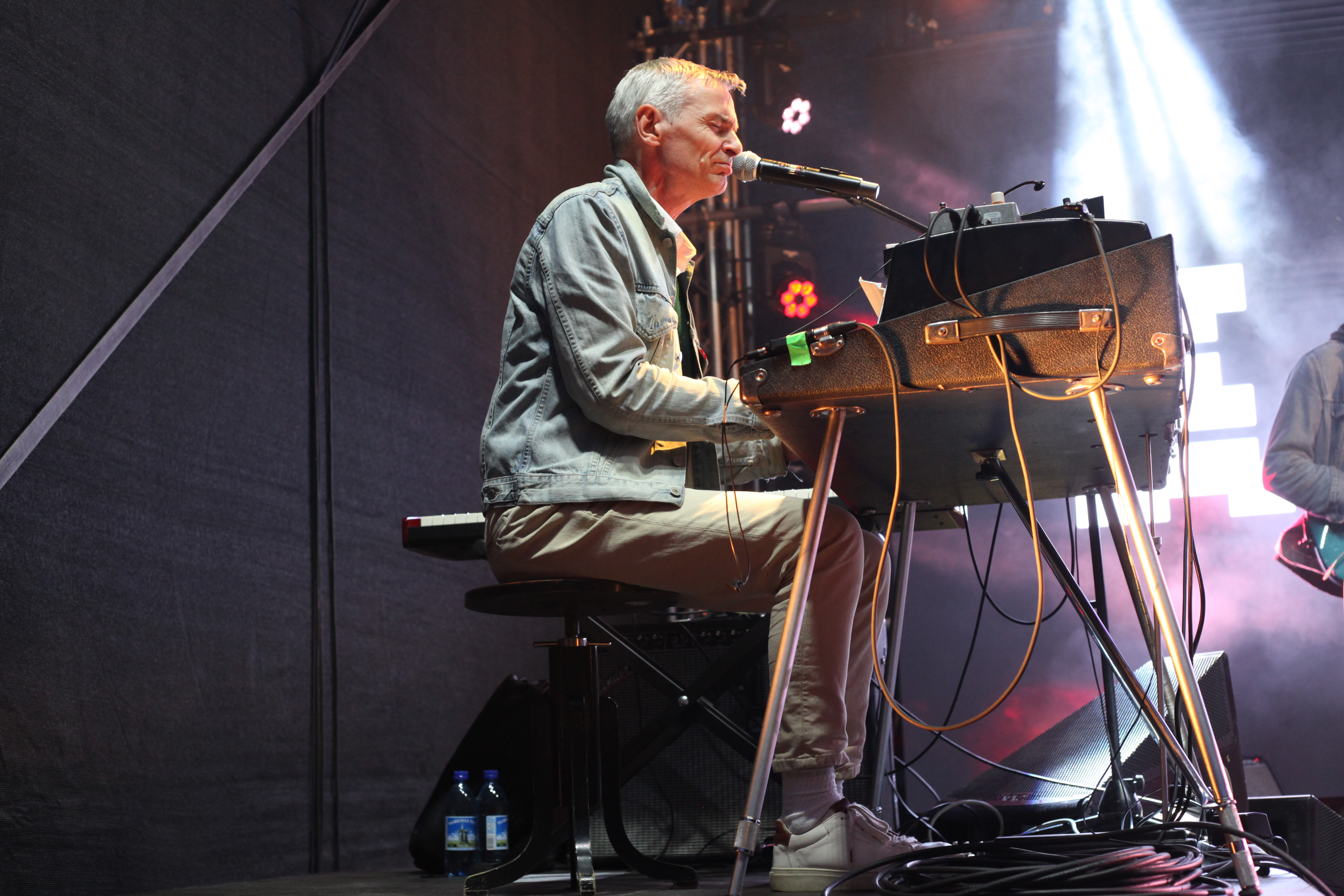
Jazz pianist Christoph Adams performing with the group Jazzanova at the KiKuMu festival in Jäneda, Estonia (July 2026)

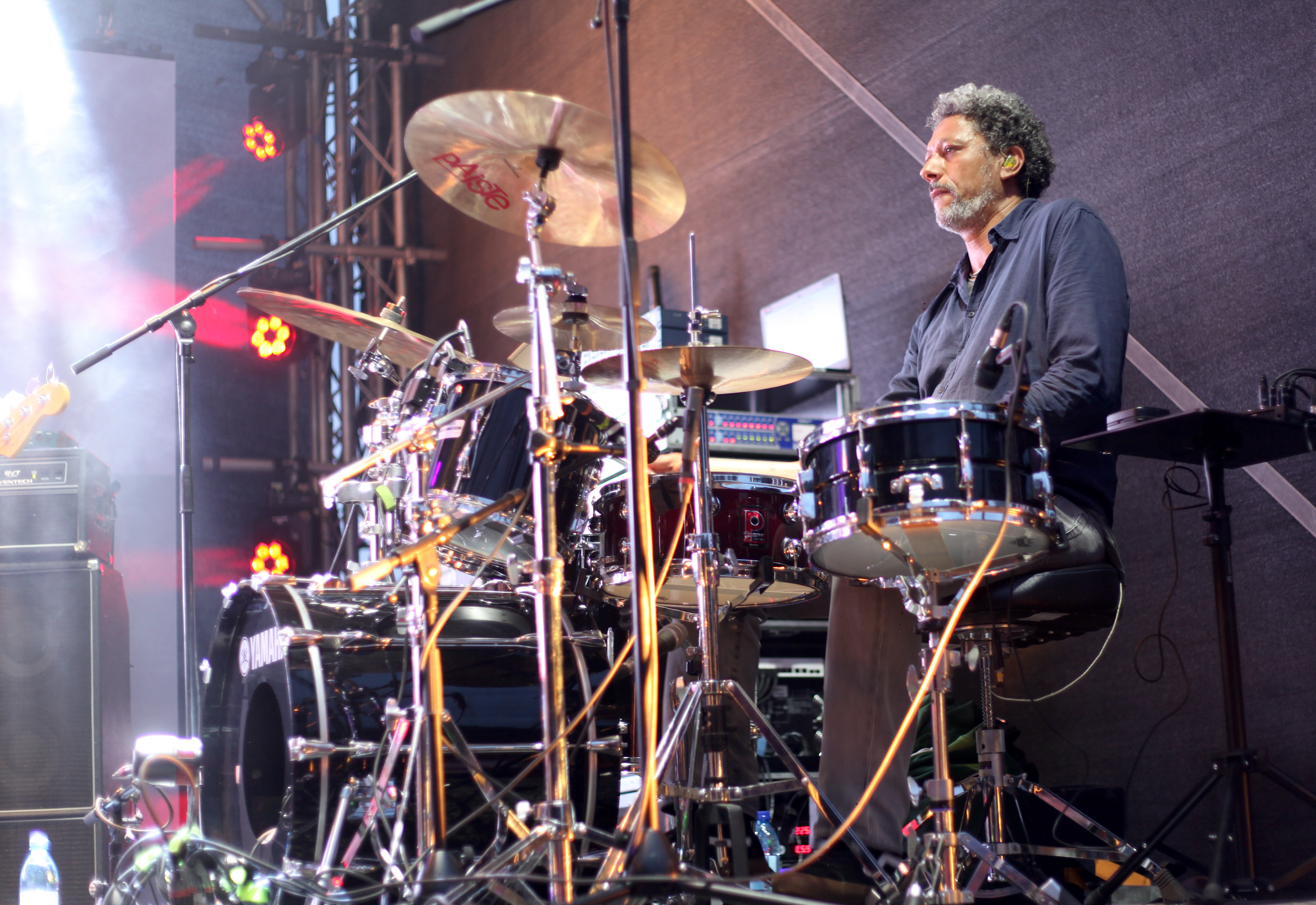
Drummer Jan Burkamp performing with the group Jazzanova at the KiKuMu festival in Jäneda, Estonia (July 2026)

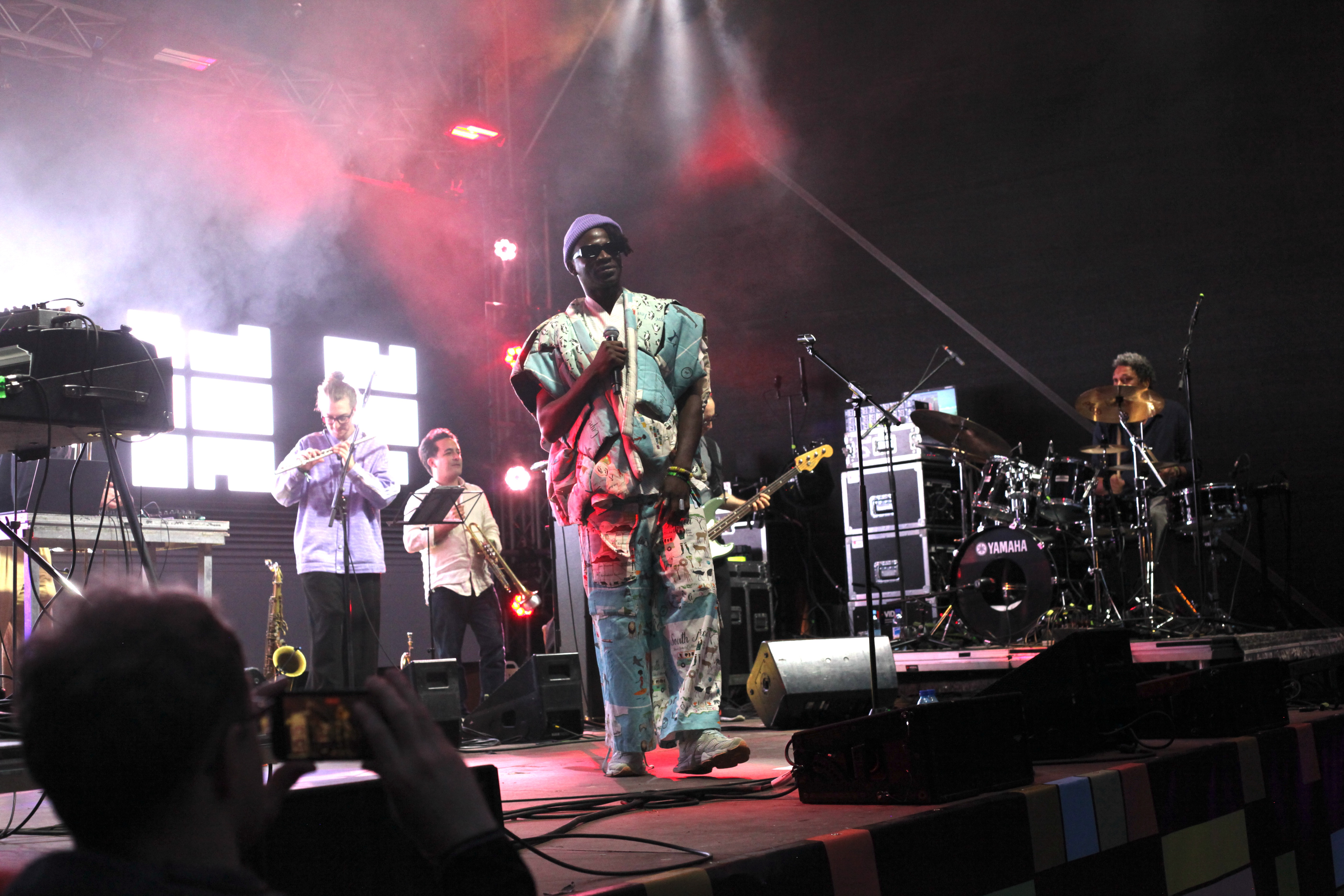
Singer Wayne Snow performing with the group Jazzanova at KiKuMu festival in Jäneda, Estonia (July 2026)

They also have a side-project, Extended Spirit, and gained recognition as remixers for acts such as Marschmellows, Ian Pooley, Incognito, 4Hero, MJ Cole, and Masters at Work.

Jazzanova released their second studio album, Of All the Things, in October 2008. Funkhaus Studio Sessions was released in May 2012 with Paul Randolph on vocals. Jazzanova announced the expected release of a new studio album, The Pool, in June 2018.

== Discography ==
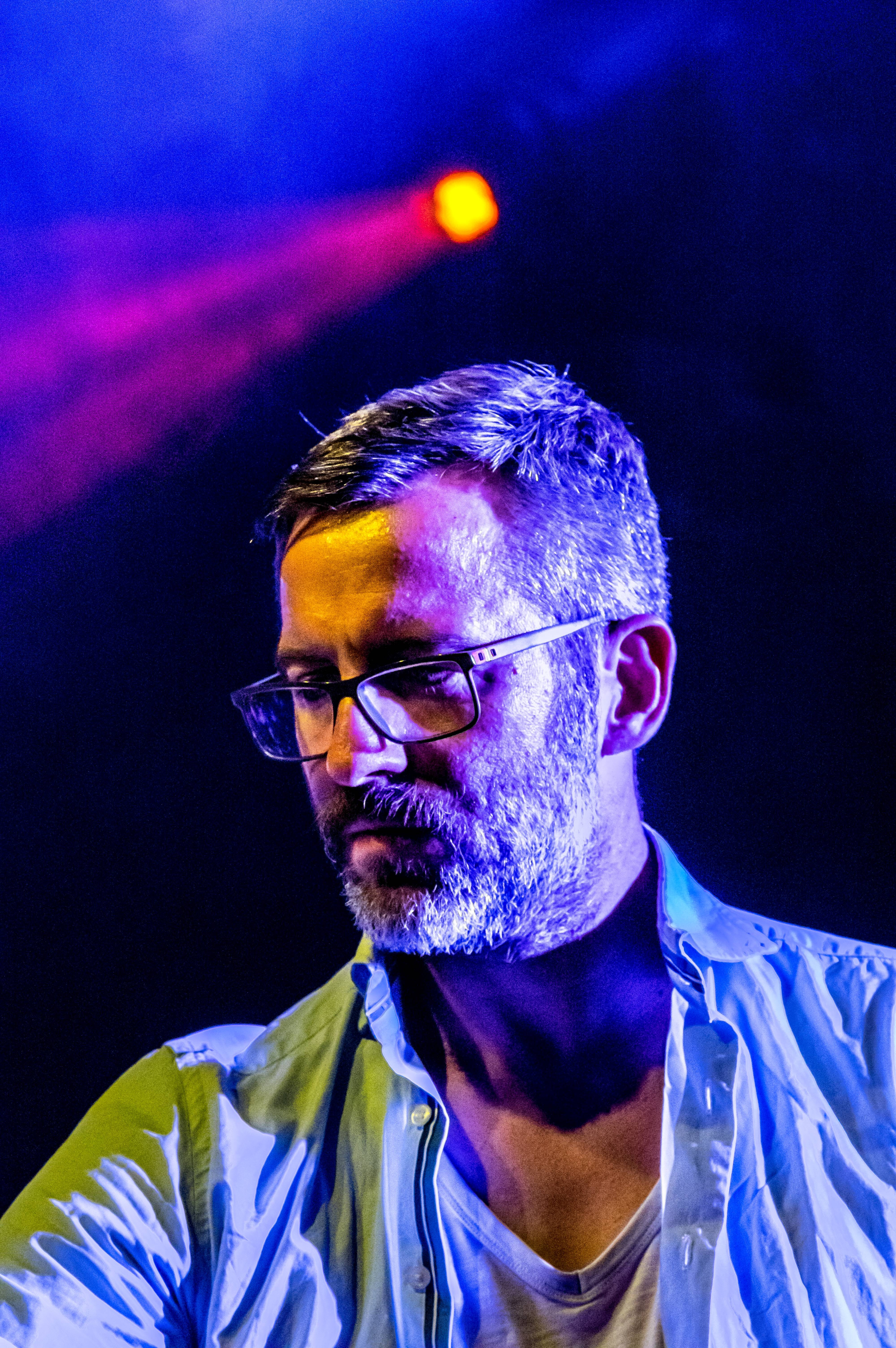
Alexander Barck, Zelt Musik Festival 2015 in Freiburg, Germany

=== Albums ===
- In Between (Jazzanova Compost, 2002)
- Of All the Things (Verve, 2008)
- Funkhaus Studio Sessions (Sonar Kollektiv, 2012) – rec. 2011
- The Pool (Sonar Kollektiv, 2018)[2LP, CD]
- Strata Records: The Sound of Detroit – Reimagined by Jazzanova (BBE, 2022)

=== Compilation albums ===
- The Single Collection 1997-2000 (Sony Music Entertainment/Compost, 2000)
- The Remixes 1997–2000 (Jazzanova Compost, 2000)[5LP, 2CD]
- Remixed (Jazzanova Compost, 2003)[2CD]
- Mixing (Sonar Kollektiv, 2004)[3LP, CD]
- The Remixes 2002–2005 (Sonar Kollektiv, 2005)
- Broad Casting (Sonar Kollektiv, 2006)
- Paz e Futebol (Sonar Kollektiv, 2006)[3LP]
- The Kings of Jazz with Gilles Peterson (Rapster, 2006)[2CD] – disc 2
- Belle et Fou (Sonar Kollektiv, 2007)
- ESP DJ Classics Vol. 11: A Number of Names with Alexander Barck (ESP DJ Classics, 2012)
- The Remixes 2006–2016 (Sonar Kollektiv, 2017)

=== Compilations appearances ===
- Future Sounds of Jazz Vol.4 (Compost, 1997)[2CD] – "Coffee Talk"
- Spliffen Sie English (Different Drummer, 1998) – "Le Jardin Secret"
- Thievery Corporation, DJ-Kicks: Thievery Corporation (Studio !K7, 1999) – "Fedime's Flight"
- Bossa Mundo (Wave Music, 2000) – "Très Bien"
- DJ Krush, Code 4109 (Sony Music, 2000)[2LP, CD] – "Coffee Talk"
- Saint-Germain-des-Prés Café
  - Volume 1 (2001) – "Coffee Talk (Yukihiro Fukutomi Remix)"
  - Volume 9 (2007) – "That Night (Live at the SK Office)"
- Gilles Peterson
  - Worldwide 2 Programme 2 (Talkin' Loud, 2002) – "Another New Day"
  - Worldwide Exclusives! (Talkin' Loud, 2004) – "Boom Klicky Boom Klack (That's What We Do)"
- Ultra. Chilled 03 (2003)[2CD] – "No Use"
- City Lounge (Wagram Electronic, 2005)[4CD]
  - Berlin / "Bohemian Sunset"
- Impeach the President (Octave, 2004) – "L.O.V.E And You And I"
- Best of Chillout & Sunset Music From Ibiza Volume 11 (Café del Mar, 2007) – "Bohemian Sunset"

=== DJ-mixes ===
- Circles (Brownswood, 1998)
- Sound of the City Vol. 3 Berlin (Universal Jazz, 1999)
- Jazzanova...Mixing (Sonar Kollektiv, 2004)
- Blue Note Trip: Lookin Back/Movin on (Blue Note, 2005)[2CD]
- Blue Note Trip: Scrambled/Mashed (Blue Note, 2006)[2CD]
- Jazzanova ...Broad Casting (Sonar Kollektiv, 2006)
- Jazzanova & Dirk Rumpff ... Broad Casting from OFFtrack Radio (Sonar Kollektiv, 2007)
- Southport Weekender Volume 7 (SuSU, 2008) – disc 1
- Secret Love 5 (Sonar Kollektiv, 2008)
- Neu Jazz (Sonar Kollektiv, 2008)
- SK200 (Sonar Kollektiv, 2008)

=== Remixes ===
- Koop – "Absolute Space" (Jazzanova Mix) – The Remixes 1997–2000 – Superstudio Grå (1997)
- Soul Quality Quartet – "Toda Tersafeira" (Jazzanova Dub) – Soul Quality Quartet EP – Sonar Kollektiv (1999)
- Azymuth – "Amazon Adventure" (Jazzanova Remix) – Off Limits – Sonar Kollektiv (1999)
- Tate's Place – "Burning" (Jazzanova Remix) – Off Limits – Dynamite Joint Recordings (1999)
- Trüby Trio – "Carajillo" (Jazzanova's Chant for Leo Mix) – Off Limits 2 – Compost Records (2000)
- Soul Quality Quartet – "Toda Tersafeira" (Jazzanova Rework) – Sonar Kollektiv 2 – Sonar Kollektiv (2003)
- Nuspirit Helsinki – "Honest" (Jazzanova's Honestly Yours Remix) – Sonar Kollektiv (2004)
- MJ Cole – "Sincere" (Jazzanova Sincerely Yours Mix) feat. Nova Caspar & Jay Dee – The Remixes 1997–2000 – Mercury Records Ltd. (2005)
- Soul Quality Quartet – "Toda Tersafeira" (Jazzanova Rework) – The Remixes 1997–2000 – Dialog Recordings/Sonar Kollektiv (2005)
- Visit Venus "Planet of Breaks" (Jazzanova Mix) – The Remixes 1997–2000 – Yo Mama's Records Co. (2005)
- Tate's Place "Burnin'" (Jazzanova Mix) – The Remixes 1997–2000 – Dynamite Joint Recordings (2005)
- Balanco "Metti Una Sera a Cena" (Jazzanova Mix)
- Ian Pooley "What's Your Number" (Jazzanova Renumber) – The Remixes 1997–2000 – V2 Records GmbH (2005)
- Liquid Lounge "Complete Life" (Jazzanova Mix) – The Remixes 1997–2000 – Pantounge Records (2005)
- Ursula Rucker "Circe" (Jazzanova Mix) – The Remixes 1997–2000 – Guidance Records (2005)
- Ski "Fifths" (Jazzanova 6 Sickth Mix) – The Remixes 1997–2000 – Sony Music (2005)
- Soul Bossa Trio "Words of Love" (Re-Loved By Jazzanova) – The Remixes 1997–2000 – Wildjumbo Tokumo Japan Communications (2005)
- Azymuth "Amazon Adventure" (Jazzanova Mix) – The Remixes 1997–2000 – Far Out Records (2005)
- United Future Organization "Friends ... We'll Be" (Jazzanova Mix) – The Remixes 1997–2000, Mercury Music Entertainment Co Ltd. (2005)
- Har-You Percussion Group "Welcome to the Party" (Jazzanova Mix) – The Remixes 1997–2000 – Ubiquity Records (2005)
- Karma "High Priestess" (Jazzanova Mix) – The Remixes 1997–2000 – Spectrum Works (2005)
- Incognito "Get into My Groove" (Jazzanova Re-Groove) – The Remixes 1997–2000 – Universal Classics and Jazz (2005)
- Trüby Trio "Carajillo" (Jazzanova's "Chant for Leo" Mix) – The Remixes 1997–2000 – Compost Records (2005)
- Men from Nile "Watch Them Come!!!" (Jazzanova Remix) – The Remixes 1997–2000 – Underground Therapy (2005)
- Marshmellows "Soulpower" (Jazzanova's Straight Dub Mix) – The Remixes 1997–2000 – Infracom (2005)
- 4Hero "We Who Are Not as Others" (Jazzanova Mix) – The Remixes 1997–2000 – Talkin Loud/Mercury Records Ltd. (2005)
- Free Design "Lullaby" (J-Nova Remix) – The Remixes 2002–2005 – Zynczak Associates (2005)
- Nuspirit Helsinki "Honest" (Jazzanova's Honestly Yours Remix) – The Remixes 2002–2005 – Sonar Kollektiv (2005)
- Calexico (Band) "Black Heart" (Jazzanova's White Soul Dub) – The Remixes 2002–2005 – City Slang / Label / EMI (2005)
- Marcos Valle "Besteiras do Amor" (Jazzanova Remix) – The Remixes 2002–2005 – Far Out Recordings (2005)
- Eddie Gale "Song of Will" (Jazzanova Rhythm Happening) – The Remixes 2002–2005 – Blue Note / EMI (2005)
- Shaun Escoffery "Let It Go" (Jazzanova Remix) – The Remixes 2002–2005 – Oyster Music Ltd. (2005)
- Status IV "You Ain't Really Down" (Jazzanova's Hey Baby Remix) – The Remixes 2002–2005 – Sonar Kollektiv (2005)
- Masters at Work feat. Roy Ayers "Our Time Is Coming" (Jazzanova's Guestlist Mix) – The Remixes 2002–2005 – MAW (2005)
- Heavy "Wonderlove (For Minnie)" (Jazzanova Remix) – The Remixes 2002–2005 – Kindered Spirit (2005)
- Status IV "You Ain't Really Down" (Jazzanova's Hey Baby Beats) – You Ain't Really Down – Sonar Kollektiv (2005)
- Status IV "Hey Baby!" – You Ain't Really Down – Sonar Kollektiv (2005)
- Fat Freddy's Drop "Breathe Easy Beats" – Flashback (Jazzanova Remixes) – Sonar Kollektiv (2006)
- Fat Freddys Drop "Flashback" (Jazzanova's Breathe Easy Mix) – Flashback (Jazzanova Remixes) – Sonar Kollektiv (2006)
- Fat Freddys Drop "Flashback" (Jazzanova's Mashed Bag Mix) – Ten Years, Who Cares? - Sonar Kollektiv (2007)
