= Rone (musician) =

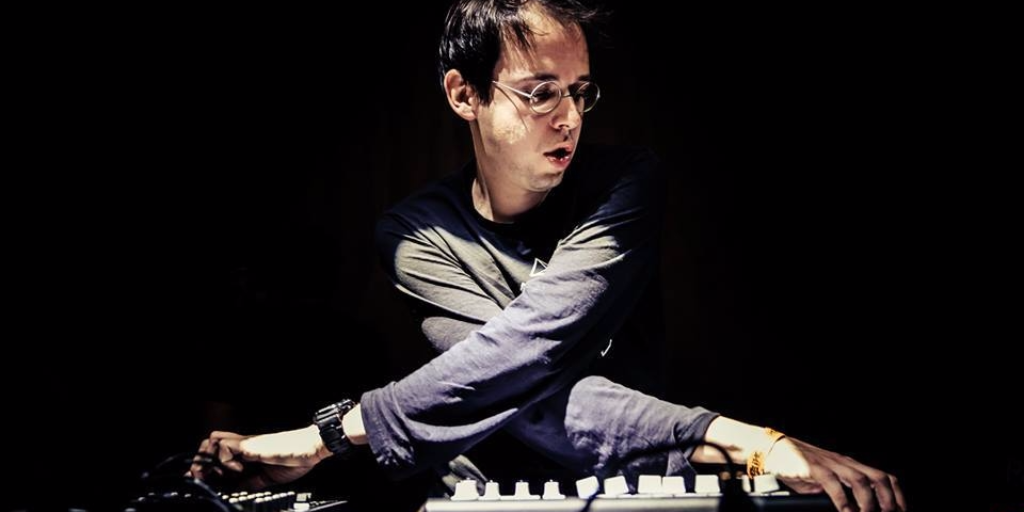
- Rone playing live at Los Globos, Los Angeles

Background information
- Born: 20 June 1980 (age 45); Boulogne Billancourt, France
- Genres: Electronica, EDM, IDM, minimal techno
- Occupations: Producer, musician
- Instruments: Laptop, keyboards, synthesisers
- Years active: 2007–present
- Label: InFiné
- Website: www.rone-music.com

Rone (born Erwan Castex, 20 June 1980) is a French electronic music producer and artist.

== Early career ==
Erwan Castex was born in Boulogne-Billancourt, France. He grew up in Paris. His first EP, "Bora", came out in 2008 on the French label InFiné. French DJ/Producer Agoria selected the track for his mix compilation "At the Controls", attracting support from the UK (Massive Attack's 3D, Sasha and London's Fabric resident DJ Lee Burridge).

== 2009–2010: Debut album Spanish Breakfast ==
In 2009, Rone released a new maxi, entitled "La Dame Blanche". The track was later remixed by LCD Soundsystem's bass player Tyler Pope and Austrian electronic music artist Clara Moto. The same year he brought out his first album Spanish Breakfast, also on Infiné. Electronic Beats ranked him in their top 25 Best Albums of 2009.

== 2011–2012: Berlin, new inspiration, new album ==
In 2011, in search of new inspiration, Rone left his hometown of Paris for Berlin. This led in the spring of 2011 to the release of the EP So So So. A second album entitled Tohu Bohu (Biblical Hebrew expression meaning chaos) followed in October 2012, likewise on Infiné. The album featured the single "Let's Go", with vocals by US rapper High Priest from New York's Antipop Consortium. Resident Advisor gave the album 4 out of 5 and Rone won three 2012 Trax Magazine awards: Best French Artist, Best Album and Best Music Video.

Tohu Bohu gave rise to three singles: "Parade", "Bye Bye Macadam" and "Let's Go". All three singles were promoted by videos, the most successful, "Bye Bye Macadam", having been viewed more than 40 million times on YouTube and been shown on Cartoon Network in Adult Swim's Off the Air episode "Worship".

== 2013: Tohu Bohu Tour, collaborations and Tohu Bonus ==
Early in 2013, the US indie band The National asked Rone to add some electronic sequences to their new album Trouble Will Find Me on 4AD. The National's lead singer Matt Berninger said in an interview, "Rone's work has brought something fresh to our sound, I’m not saying we re-invented ourselves as a band, but we’ve opened new doors".

The same year, Gabriel & Dresden, Juan Atkins, Clark (musician) and Dominik Eulberg remixed respectively the tracks "Bye Bye Macadam", "Let's Go", and "Parade". Jean-Michel Jarre selected two of his tracks to feature on the compilation "Infiné by JMJ". The album Tohu Bohu was later re-released with a bonus disc with 6 unreleased tracks; one of them features John Stanier on drums.

== 2014: Apache EP – North American tour ==
2014 saw the release of the Apache EP, in April. Simultaneously Rone toured North America for the first time, finishing with an appearance at Coachella Valley Music and Arts Festival's The Do LaB Stage. In the same year, Rone made remixes for French pop singer Etienne Daho and the band Breton.

== Testing new technologies ==
Rone also collaborated with sound engineers from Radio France on binaural versions of the tracks "Apache", "Quitter la ville" and "Acid Reflux", reproducing an audio 3D effect.

== 2015 : Third album: Creatures ==
After tours around the world, Rone returned to Paris and released his third album, Creatures, on 9 February 2015. Various artists collaborated on this album: Étienne Daho, François Marry (leader of pop group Frànçois and The Atlas Mountains), cellist Gaspar Claus, Bryce Dessner (co-leader of the group The National), and trumpet player Toshinori Kondo.

Rone also released a 360° virtual reality project, Quitter La Ville, in collaboration with La Blogothèque. The video was one of the first digital simulation clips, making him a pioneer in the Virtual Reality field.

== 2017: La Philharmonie de Paris / Fourth album: Mirapolis ==
On 14 January 2017, Rone performed a bespoke piece at the Philharmonie de Paris for which he invited various guest artists: the drummer John Stanier of the group Battles, the science-fiction writer Alain Damasio, and the leader of Frànçois and The Atlas Mountains François Marry.

On 23 March 2017, Castex received the French honorary decoration of Chevalier de l'Ordre des Arts et des Lettres.

On 3 November 2017, Rone released his fourth album Mirapolis. The title was inspired by his childhood memories at the Mirapolis theme park, which closed in 1991. For Mirapolis, Castex pushed further his collaborative work, working alongside film director Michel Gondry who illustrated the album cover. His fourth album also includes various international collaborators: John Stanier, the drummer from Battles (formerly also Helmet), Kazu Makino from the vocal trio Blonde Redhead, Bryce Dessner, the guitarist of The National, and Baxter Dury.

== 2020: Room With A View ==
Invited by Ruth Mackenzie, the artistic director of Théâtre du Châtelet, Rone received a carte blanche for 9 performances, from March 5 to 14. Rone decided to collaborate with the collective (La)Horde for Room With A View. This project was both a musical and choreographic piece, performed by 18 dancers from the Ballet national de Marseille. This creative project mainly addresses the messages of climate change. Simultaneously, Room With A View became the artist's fifth album.

In 2020, Rone composed the original soundtrack for the feature film Night Ride. The score led to him being awarded the prize for best original soundtrack at the Festival International du film de Saint- Jean-de Luzz and at the Festival de La Baule. Rone also took home the 2021 César Award for Best Original Music.

== 2021: Rone & Friends - L(oo)ping ==
After previous projects being held back due to the COVID-19 pandemic, Rone decided to produce a collaborative album with his vocalists Odezenne, Georgia, Jehnny Beth, Dominique A, Laura Etchgoyhen, Alain Damasio, Mood, Flavien Berger, Yael Naim, Malibu, Camélia Jordana, Casper Clausen, Melissa Laveaux and Roya Arab.

On 25 and 26 June 2021, Rone released L(oo)ping, an electro-classic concert, held at the Auditorium Maurice-Ravel, accompanied by 81 musicians from the Orchestre national de Lyon, the pianist Vanessa Wagner and the choir Bostgehio, under the direction of the Belgian conductor Dirk Brossé.

== Discography ==
=== Studio albums ===
Year	Title	Label	
2009	Spanish Breakfast	InFiné	
2012	Tohu Bohu	InFiné	
2013	Tohu Bonus	InFiné	
2015	Creatures	InFiné	
2017	Mirapolis	InFiné	
2020	Room With A View	InFiné	
2020	La Nuit Venue (Original Motion Picture Soundtrack)	InFiné	
2021	Rone & Friends	InFiné	Collaborative album — Dominique A, Yael Naim, Camélia Jordana, Georgia, Casper Clausen...
2021	Les Olympiades (Original Motion Picture Soundtrack)	InFiné	

=== Live albums ===
Year	Title	Label
2023	L(oo)ping Live with Orchestre national de Lyon	InFiné

=== Extended plays ===
Year	Title	Label
2008	Bora	InFiné
2009	La Dame Blanche	InFiné
2011	So So So	InFiné
2012	Parade	InFiné
2013	Bye Bye Macadam	InFiné
2013	Let's Go	InFiné
2014	Apache	InFiné
2016	Vood(oo)	InFiné
2019	Motion	InFiné
2022	Ghosts	InFiné

=== Remixes ===
Year	Artist	Track	Label
2008	Sie	Sublimes	Time has changed Records
2008	Carl-Johan Elger	Kattguld	Lo-FiSoul
2010	Ripperton & Minz	Crack	Suruba X
2010	SinnerDC	The Medium Is The Message	Ai Records
2011	Arandel	In D#3	InFiné
2011	Dominik Eulberg	Der Tanz der Gluehwuermchen	Traum Schallplatten
2012	Max Cooper (electronica musician)	Simplexity	Traum Schallplatten
2014	Breton (band)	15 minutes	Believe
2014	Etienne Daho	En Surface	Polydor/Universal Music France
2015	Yael Naim	Coward	Tôt ou tard
2015	Aufgang	Summer	Blue Note/Universal Music France
2018	Jabberwocky	Fog	Polydor/Universal Music France
2018	Blonde Redhead	Where Your Mind Wants To Go	Asa Wa Kuru/Ponderose
2018	Gaspar Claus, Gasper Clausen	The Machine	Les Disques Du Festival Permanent
2019	Johnny Hostile	Work	Pop Noire
2021	GoGo Penguin	F Maj Pixie	Decca Records France
2021	Agnes Obel	Can't Be	Deutsche Grammophon GmbH, Strange Harvest Limited
2021	Jehnny Beth	French Countryside	20L07

=== Collaborations ===
Year	Artist	Title	Label
2007	Lucy & Rone	Chocolate	Broque
2007	Lucy & Rone	Continuity Theory	Curle
2009	Lucy & Rone	Crack	ProgCity Deep Trax
2009	Lucy & Rone	Great Heron	ProgCity Deep Trax
2013	The National	Trouble Will Find Me	4AD
2016	Jean-Michel Jarre	The Heart Of Noise Pt. 1	Sony Music

== Filmography ==
- 2010: The Cord Woman (Original soundtrack)
- 2014: The Beast (short film) (Original soundtrack)
- 2016 : Half Sister, Full Love, Opening credits (Bye Bye Macadam)
- 2016 : I, Philip (Original soundtrack)
- 2016 : I Want Pluto to be a planet again (Original soundtrack)
- 2020 : Night Ride (Original soundtrack)
- 2021 : Paris, 13th District (feature film) / Les Olympiades (Original soundtrack)
- 2024 : The Mohican (Original soundtrack)

== Choreographic pieces ==
- 2020: Room With A View, (La)Horde & Rode with the Ballet National de Marseille at the Théâtre du Châtelet

== Distinctions ==
- 2016: Berlin Music Video Awards, nominated for Best Experimental for his work ACID REFLUX
- 2021: Berlin Music Video Awards, winner for Best Experimental for his work Room With a View
- 2017: Chevalier des Arts et des Lettres
- 2020: Grand Prix SACEM for electronic music
- 2019: Berlin Music Video Awards, nominated for Best Narrative for his work 'Wave' ft. Noga Erez
- 2021—46th César Awards: Disque d'Or of Cannes Soundtrack Award (Festival de Cannes) for the original soundtrack of Les Olympiades.
- 2022—47th César Awards: nominated for César Award for Best Original Music for Les Olympiades.
