= Bruce Brubaker =

American pianist

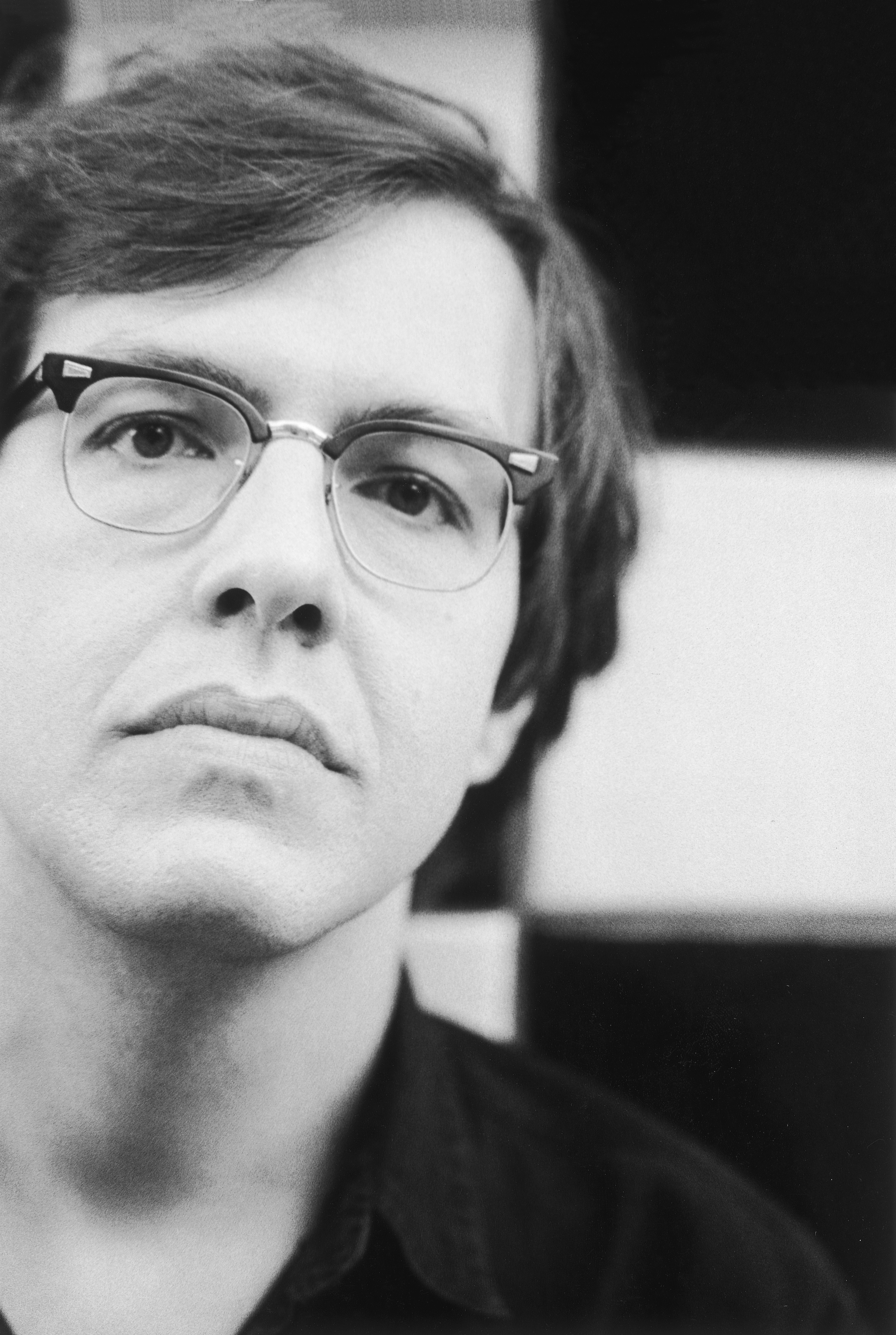
Bruce Brubaker in 1995

Bruce Brubaker is a musician, artist, concert pianist, and writer from the United States.

== Concepts ==
Brubaker's work uses and combines Western classical music with postmodern artistic, literary, theatrical, and philosophical ideas. He is associated with the 21st century revitalization of classical music (sometimes termed "alternative classical"). With over 160 million plays on Spotify, Brubaker reaches a large music audience online. Brubaker's recordings have been remixed by prominent electronic musicians, including Plaid, Max Cooper, Akufen, Francesco Tristano, Laurel Halo, Olga Bell, Arandel, and others. The New York Times wrote: "Few pianists approach Philip Glass's music with the level of devotion and insight that Bruce Brubaker brings to it, precisely the reason he gets so much expressivity out of it." He has performed at London's Barbican Hall, the Philharmonie de Paris, New York's David Geffen Hall, and at BOZAR in Brussels. He has created and performed multidisciplinary artworks at the Festival de La Roque-d'Anthéron, the Institute of Contemporary Art, Boston, the Institute for Advanced Study in Princeton, New Jersey, the Irving S. Gilmore International Keyboard Festival, Columbia University, and at the Juilliard School. Brubaker is an advisor to Yamaha's artificial intelligence project, "Dear Glenn".

Brubaker has published articles about music and semiotics, and performance as research. His blog, "PianoMorphosis", appears at ArtsJournal.com. Brubaker advocates the treatment of written music as "text". He has sometimes performed and recorded new music without the direct input of the composer. Brubaker has said: "The piano is a tool that can be used in different ways. Classical music can be taken as material for new art." Brubaker has argued that technology is returning music to a pre-composer condition, and equalizing or blurring the roles of listener, performer, and composer. In a conversation with Philip Glass at Princeton, Brubaker referred to "the demise of the composer". Brubaker said: "Now, it's becoming a little less clear who creates a work, who plays the work, and who listens to the work. Those roles used to seem to be so clear – you know, Beethoven wrote it, Brendel played it, and the audience at Carnegie heard it. But I don't think that quite works anymore."

== Background ==
Brubaker was born in Des Moines, Iowa, and educated at the Juilliard School, where his primary teacher was pianist Jacob Lateiner. At Juilliard, he also studied with Milton Babbitt and Felix Galimir, and with Louis Krasner at Tanglewood. As a concert pianist, he has appeared performing Mozart with the Los Angeles Philharmonic at the Hollywood Bowl, Haydn at the Wigmore Hall, Alvin Curran at Kings Place in London, Messiaen and Philip Glass at New York City's (Le) Poisson Rouge nightclub, Brahms at Leipzig's Gewandhaus, and extemporizing simultaneous performances with his former student Francesco Tristano and jazz legend Ran Blake.

He received a fellowship grant from the National Endowment for the Arts, and was named Young Musician of the Year by Musical America. Brubaker was a National Merit Scholar. He has performed at New York's Zankel Hall, Antwerp's Queen Elizabeth Hall, the Gaîté lyrique in Paris, the Tanglewood Festival, and the Sónar festival in Barcelona.

== Recording ==
Brubaker's solo piano recordings survey a range of American music by Philip Glass, John Adams, Alvin Curran, William Duckworth, Meredith Monk, Nico Muhly, and John Cage. Brubaker has premiered piano music by Cage, Mark-Anthony Turnage, Nico Muhly, and Daron Hagen. He has collaborated with Meredith Monk. In 2012, Brubaker, together with Ursula Oppens, recorded Monk's piano music. His album Codex includes multiple readings of Terry Riley's Keyboard Study No. 2 and Renaissance keyboard pieces from the Codex Faenza. Brubaker's album with Max Cooper, Glassforms, is based on live performances at Cité de la musique in Paris that combined piano music by Glass, improvisation, and electronic sounds produced using a randomizing algorithm controlled by MIDI signals coming from the live piano performance. Eno Piano is Brubaker's solo reworking of ambient music by Brian Eno. The project uses electro-magnetic "bows" producing long tones by making strings inside a piano vibrate for extended time periods.

== Curator and teacher ==
For nine years, Brubaker was a faculty member at the Juilliard School where he originated an interdisciplinary performance program in 2001, producing new work with dancers, actors, and musicians. Students from Brubaker's piano repertory class at Juilliard include many distinguished pianists: Francesco Tristano, Simone Dinnerstein, Shai Wosner, Helen Huang, Lera Auerbach, Vicky Chow, David Greilsammer, Elizabeth Joy Roe, Greg Anderson, Vikingur Olafsson, Stewart Goodyear, Adam Nieman, Soyeon Kate Lee, Terrence Wilson, Christopher Guzman, Eric Huebner. At Juilliard, he gave public presentations with Philip Glass, Meredith Monk, and Milton Babbitt.

In 2000, he produced "Piano Century", an 11-concert retrospective of 20th-century piano music. Since 2004, Brubaker has been a faculty member at Boston's New England Conservatory, where he has curated several projects in collaboration with the Boston Symphony and Harvard University. At New England Conservatory, Brubaker has appeared in public conversations with Alvin Curran, Meredith Monk, Tim Page, Salvatore Sciarrino and Russell Sherman. In 2005, Brubaker became Chair of Piano at New England Conservatory. With Brubaker's leadership, including new piano faculty hiring, New England Conservatory became the dominant piano training institution in the world. Notable pianists studying at the conservatory who emerged on world stages following 2005 include, Lukáš Vondráček, George Li, Eric Lu, Yunchan Lim, Aristo Sham, Yutong Sun, Evren Ozel, Clayton Stephenson, and Saehyun Kim. Brubaker also serves as Curator of Piano Programming at New England Conservatory.

In 1994, Brubaker founded SummerMusic, now held at Drake University in his hometown of Des Moines; he returns annually to lead it.

== Discography ==
Brubaker records for ECM, InFiné, Arabesque, and Bedroom Community.

- Brahms, Wagner, Steuermann, music for piano by Brahms, Wagner, and Eduard Steuermann, Vital Music, 1994
- glass cage, music for piano by Philip Glass and John Cage, Arabesque, 2000
- Inner Cities, music for piano by John Adams and Alvin Curran, Arabesque, 2004
- Hope Street Tunnel Blues, music for piano by Philip Glass and Alvin Curran, Arabesque, 2007
- Time Curve, music for piano by Glass and William Duckworth, Arabesque, 2009
- Drones & Piano EP, music for piano and electronics by Nico Muhly, Bedroom Community, 2012
- Drones & Viola EP, with Nadia Sirota, viola, music for viola and piano by Nico Muhly, Bedroom Community, 2012
- Drones, with Nadia Sirota, viola, Pekka Kuusisto, violin, Nico Muhly, piano, Bedroom Community, 2012
- Piano Songs, music for solo piano and 2 pianos by Meredith Monk, including arrangements by Brubaker, ECM, 2014
- Glass Piano, music for piano by Philip Glass, including arrangements by Brubaker, InFiné (Warp Records), 2015
- Glass Piano: Versions, remixes by Plaid, Francesco Tristano, Akufen, John Beltran, Biblo, and Julian Earle, InFiné (Warp Records), 2015
- Revelations, music for solo piano and chamber music by Su Lian Tan, Arsis, 2017
- Codex, music from Codex Faenza and six versions of Terry Riley's Keyboard Study No. 2, InFiné (Warp Records), 2018
- Codex Versions, remixes by Max Cooper, Olga Bell, and Arandel, InFiné (Warp Records), 2018
- Glassforms, music by Philip Glass, Bruce Brubaker, and Max Cooper, InFiné, 2020
- Glassforms Versions, music by Philip Glass, Bruce Brubaker, Max Cooper, Donato Dozzy, Laurel Halo, Tegh, and Daniele Di Gregorio, InFiné, 2021
- Eno Piano, music by Brian Eno and others, Bruce Brubaker, piano, InFiné, 2023
- Eno Piano 2, music by Brian Eno and others, Bruce Brubaker, piano, InFiné, 2024

== Arrangements and transcriptions ==
John Adams: “Pat’s Aria” (from Nixon in China) (transcribed for piano by Bruce Brubaker)
Brian Eno: Music for Airports (transcribed for piano by Bruce Brubaker and Simon Hanes)
Brian Eno: By This River (transcribed for piano by Bruce Brubaker)
Brian Eno: The Chill Air (transcribed for piano by Bruce Brubaker)
Brian Eno: The Big Ship (transcribed for piano by Bruce Brubaker)
Brian Eno: Failing Light (transcribed for piano by Bruce Brubaker)
Philip Glass: “Knee Play 4” (from Einstein on the Beach) (transcribed for solo piano by Bruce Brubaker)
Philip Glass: “The Poet Acts” (from ‘The Hours’ (transcribed for solo piano by Bruce Brubaker)
(Gustav Mahler:) Bruce Brubaker’s Mahler’s Ninth Symphony (piano, violin, viola, cello)
Olivier Messiaen: Prelude No. 1, “La colombe” (transcribed for flute and piano by Bruce Brubaker, for Paula Robison)
Meredith Monk: Totentanz (transcribed for 2 pianos by Bruce Brubaker)
Meredith Monk: Parlour Games (transcribed for 2 pianos by Bruce Brubaker)
Meredith Monk: Urban March (Shadow) (transcribed for 2 pianos by Bruce Brubaker)
Meredith Monk: Tower (transcribed for 2 pianos by Bruce Brubaker)
