= Arandel =

- Genres: Contemporary music, music, electroacoustic, techno

Arandel is a French anonymous musical project. The performer remains anonymous and performs behind curtains during live DJ sets, although they have supporting musicians that are known join them. The group only uses instruments, disavowing samplers and MIDI devices. Their first album was In D, in 2010. The band has played at several festivals in France.

== Discography ==
=== Albums ===
- 2010: In D
- 2011: In D Remixed
- 2011: In D (vinyl version w/ bonus tracks)
- 2014: Solarispellis
- 2015: Umbrapellis
- 2016: Extrapellis
- 2017: Aleae

=== EPs ===
- 2010: In D#5 EP
- 2010: In D#3 EP

=== Remixes ===
Year	Artist	Track	Label
2008	Agoria feat. Scalde	Dust	Different
2011	Tahiti 80	Darlin' (Adam & Eve song)	Human Sounds
2011	Pokett	Three More Chords	Les Boutiques Sonores Records
2011	Vanessa Wagner & Les Siècles	Mozart's Piano Concerto No. 23 in A, K. 488: II. Adagio	InFiné
2012	Composer	Polar Bear	InFiné
2013	Peruvian Folk Music	Wedding Song	Not On Label
2013	Austra (band)	Home	Domino
2013	Son Lux	Easy	Joyful Noise
2016	Yael Naim	I Walk Until	Tôt ou tard

=== Mixtapes ===
- 2009: Carols, the Minuit mixtape
- 2010: Aube, the Ringing Bells mixtape
- 2010: Spéléoliennes, the Library mixtape
- 2012: Neige, the Christmas mixtape
- 2013: Hocus Pocus, The Berghain mixtape
- 2014: C'est La Mode, A Podcast About Fashion In The French 60's
- 2016: Bog Bog, the Electronic Ladyland mixtape
- 2017: From Beyond, the Halloween mixtape

== Live music and artistic installations ==
- October 2013: "Cosme & Damiaõ", a play by Gilles Pastor, KastorAgile company (Salvador de Bahia, Brazil)
- May 2012: "Un homme qui dort", a play by Alexandra Rübner inspired by Georges Perec’s novel (Le Trident, Cherbourg)
- June 2011: "Poussières", Alexandra Rübner reading, based on a texts by Barbey D'Aurevilly (Le Trident, Cherbourg)
- April 2011: "In Tono Rumori", installation at la Gaîté Lyrique in Paris, for 150 speakers on three floors, composed around the theatre walls’ memory.
- May 2010: "L'Infante", a play by Maxence Garnier (Ciné 13, Paris)
