= Pitchfork Music Festival Paris 2012 =

Music festival

- Dates: 1–3 November 2012
- Locations: Grande halle de la Villette, Paris, France
- Website: pitchforkmusicfestival.fr

The Pitchfork Music Festival Paris 2012 was held on 1 to 3 November 2012 at the Grande halle de la Villette, Paris, France. The festival was headlined by M83, Animal Collective and Grizzly Bear.

== Lineup ==
Headline performers are listed in boldface. Artists listed from latest to earliest set times.

Thursday, 1 November	Friday, 2 November	Saturday, 3 November
**M83**; James Blake; Sébastien Tellier; John Talabot; Chairlift; Japandroids; Factory Floor; DIIV; AlunaGeorge; How to Dress Well	**Animal Collective**; Fuck Buttons; Robyn; Chromatics; The Walkmen; The Tallest Man on Earth; Wild Nothing; Jessie Ware; Ratking; Outfit	Julio Bashmore; Simian Mobile Disco; Rustie; Totally Enormous Extinct Dinosaurs; Disclosure; **Grizzly Bear**; Breton; Death Grips; Liars; Twin Shadow; Purity Ring; Cloud Nothings; Isaac Delusion

== Pre- and post-parties ==
The pre- and post-parties were held at the Le Trabendo. The opening party was held on 31 October and featured performances by Melody's Echo Chamber, Lotus Plaza, Clinic and College. The first day after-party was presented by R&S Records and the second day was presented by Italians Do It Better.
