= War Room Stories =

Studio album by Breton
- Released: 3 February 2014
- Recorded: 2013 Berlin
- Genres: Indie rock, electronic, EDM
- Length: 40:37
- Label: Believe

Breton chronology
Force of Habit EP (2013)	War Room Stories (2014)

Professional ratings
Aggregate scores
Source	Rating
Metacritic	68/100
Review scores
Source	Rating
AllMusic	3.5/5 stars
Clash	8/10
Drowned in Sound	7/10

War Room Stories is the second full-length album by English band Breton. It was released on 3 February 2014 through Believe Records. The album received generally favorable reviews. The song "Got Well Soon" was featured in the 2015 video game Life Is Strange and Dior's commercial for Diorshow mascara.

== Track listing ==
All tracks are written by Breton.

Standard release
No.	Title	Length
1.	"Envy"	3:37
2.	"S4"	5:26
3.	"Legs & Arms"	3:07
4.	"Got Well Soon"	4:49
5.	"Closed Category"	4:21
6.	"National Grid"	3:53
7.	"Search Party"	3:43
8.	"302 Watchtowers"	3:26
9.	"Brothers"	4:25
10.	"Fifteen Minutes"	3:59
Total length:		40:46

Bonus tracks
No.	Title	Length
11.	"Port of Call"	5:06
12.	"Light Emitting Diode"	4:04
13.	"Convention Centre"	3:22
14.	"A Close Personal Friend Of Mine"	3:22
15.	"Treadmill"	3:14
16.	"Exit Row"	4:53
17.	"It's Like This Everywhere"	3:23
18.	"Guard Duty"	3:51
19.	"Sticker Factory"	4:44
20.	"Titan"	2:56
21.	"Parthian Shot"	3:37
Total length:		83:18
