= Laser harp =

Type of musical instrument

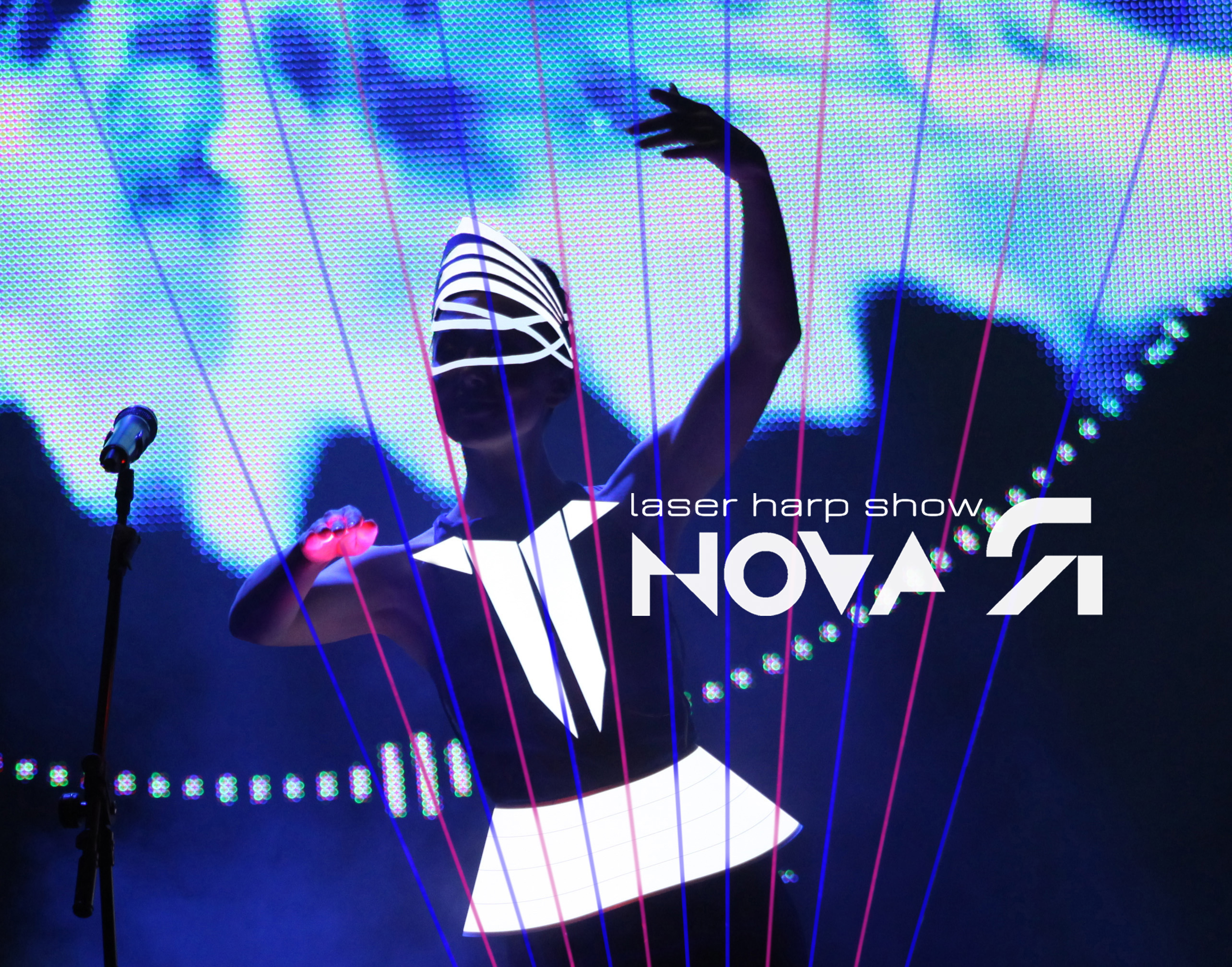
Opera performer NovaYA playing the laser harp

A laser harp is an electronic musical user interface and laser lighting display. It projects several laser beams played by the musician by blocking them to produce sounds, visually reminiscent of a harp. It was popularised by Jean-Michel Jarre, and has been a high-profile feature of almost all his concerts since 1981.

== Invention ==
French composer Bernard Szajner applied to patent the laser harp in 1981. It was granted in 1982, meaning that the French patent office had found no evidence of another inventor of the same or similar instrument before him.

However, Australian inventor Geoffrey Rose claims to have taken out a provisional patent with the United Kingdom's patent office in 1975–1976, and his invention may have been shown and used as early as 1976.

== Design ==
=== Framed style ===
The framed style, which is often created to look like a harp with strings, uses an array of photodiodes or photoresistors inside the upper or lower part of the frame to detect blocking of the laser beams. The framed harp built by Geoffrey Rose in 1975–1976 was an octagonal shape with a 5×5 matrix of laser beams. The lasers can be mounted on the 'neck' or upper side of the harp, shining down, or on the body, shining up. Typically, the lasers used are very low-powered 5 mW red or green lasers, which are considered safe for public interaction by the FDA. Any number of laser beams can be arranged in this type of laser harp, from as few as one or two, up to 32 or more, depending on the capacity of the MIDI controller(s) and software being used. This style can be built in any size, from a lap-sized harp to a room-sized installation, or larger. In this design, only an analog trigger is created by the breaking of the beam (and the DC circuit made by the beam shining on the optic sensor), which is sufficient to trigger any number of events (musical or otherwise) as determined by the data analyser or software in question. In the MIDI controller, this analog DC current interruption is converted to a digital signal, which is then used to trigger many possible events or actions. Some software comes equipped with full wave file editors and synthesizers, and can also trigger video and still imagery via projection units.

=== Unframed style ===
This style of laser harp is generally built using a single laser, splitting its beam into an array of beams in parallel or fan arrangement. Playing the actual sound is usually handled by connecting the laser harp to a synthesizer, sampler or computer.

This frameless design is more elaborate than the framed style, relying on reflecting the light back to a single photodiode. The fan of laser beams is actually a single beam scanned into a fan pattern. By matching the timing of the reflected beam, the instrument can determine which beam the player is blocking and sound the corresponding note. Alternative designs use multiple lasers. In these designs, each laser can be independently controlled (pulsed on and off) to simulate playback of prerecorded notes.

Several techniques generate more control data, such as a continuous range of values like those in typical MIDI controllers:

- An infrared or ultrasonic rangefinder attached to the instrument that determines the position of the hand that blocks a beam
- A laser-based rangefinder that determines the distance from the hand to the laser's starting or ending point (and possibly using this laser itself as the string)—or a variation of this that uses the intensity of the sensor signal itself
- A camera that tracks position and motion of the laser dot on the hand, or length of the exposed beam if visible, then calculates a continuous value based upon a reference

The first of these is relatively inexpensive and straightforward to implement, and can use the same micro-controller that drives the lasers and reads the detectors.

The advantage of a dedicated sensor mechanism is that the instrument can be self-contained, as opposed to requiring a computer to control it with input from an ILDA interface and USB camera. The PC-based approach, however, offers more flexibility and can be constructed with mostly off-the-shelf hardware.

Unframed laser harps benefit from the use of higher-power lasers, as they facilitate easier detection by the sensor system. As the sensor is exposed to all ambient light, it can be swamped by stage lighting behind the artist if the sensitivity is too high. To avoid this, the system can use ambient light sensors to reject ambient light. The player may use white or light-coloured gloves to improve performance by scattering more light off the player's hands to provide the sensor with a higher signal-to-noise ratio with respect to ambient light. Furthermore, the gloves protect the player's skin from potentially hazardous laser radiation and give audiences a more visual impression of the instrument.

=== Unframed style, "image recognition" ===
The image recognition laser harp is also an unframed design, but uses a high-speed USB camera connected to a laptop computer, instead of a photodiode to detect the reflected light from the hand breaking the beam. The digital picture is analysed by the computer software to determine which beam is broken and send the appropriate MIDI signal back to the synthesizer, which is responsible for creating the sound.

=== Multicolour ===
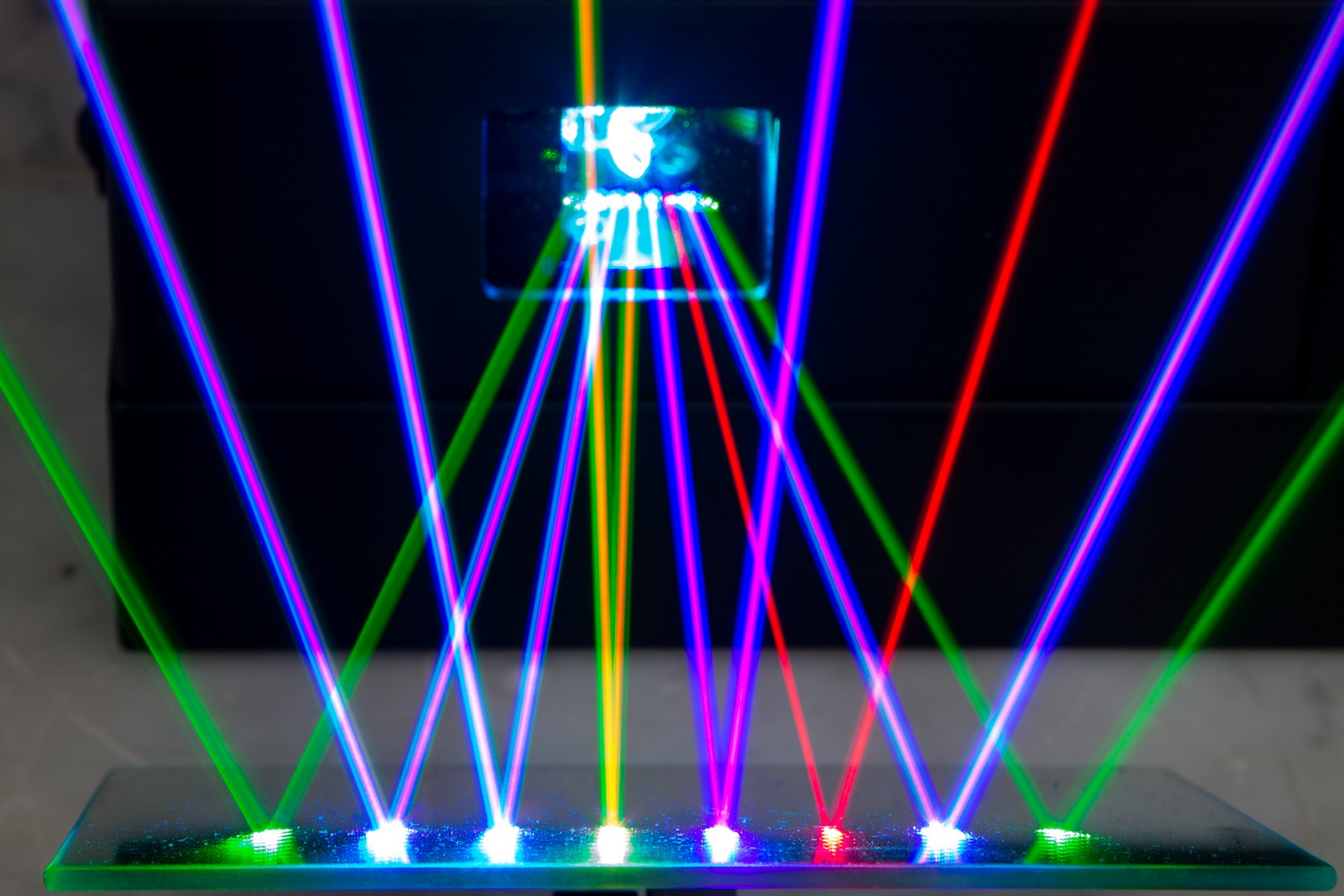
Multicolour beams at the laser harp controller

Clip showing how the software can simulate and program the hardware even with visual effects

In 2005, a free multicolour laser harp project using an ILDA interface was shared on laser discussion boards and revealed the same year at a German meeting.

== Notable uses ==
=== In Jean-Michel Jarre concerts ===
Jarre's laser harp

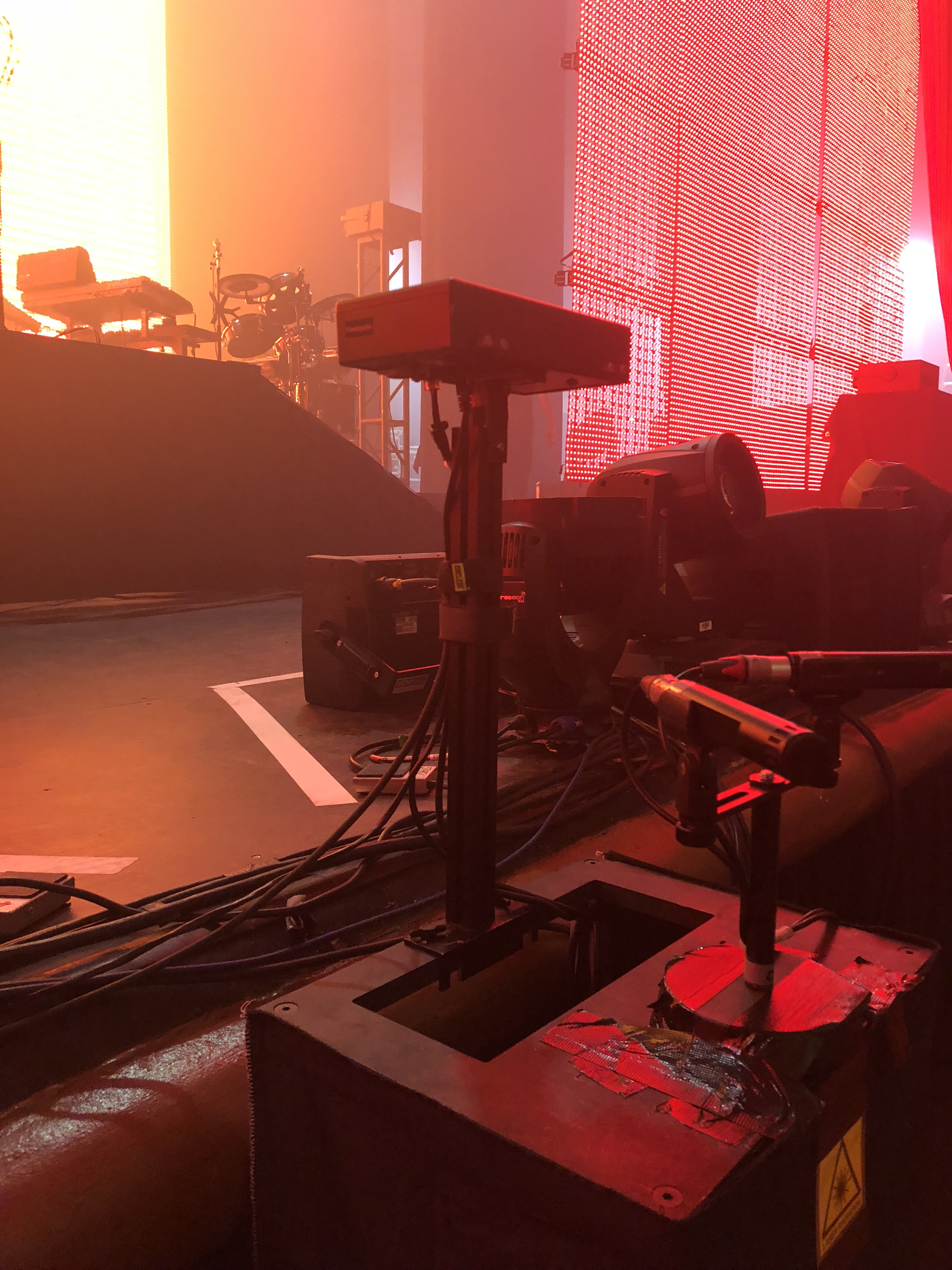
On stage

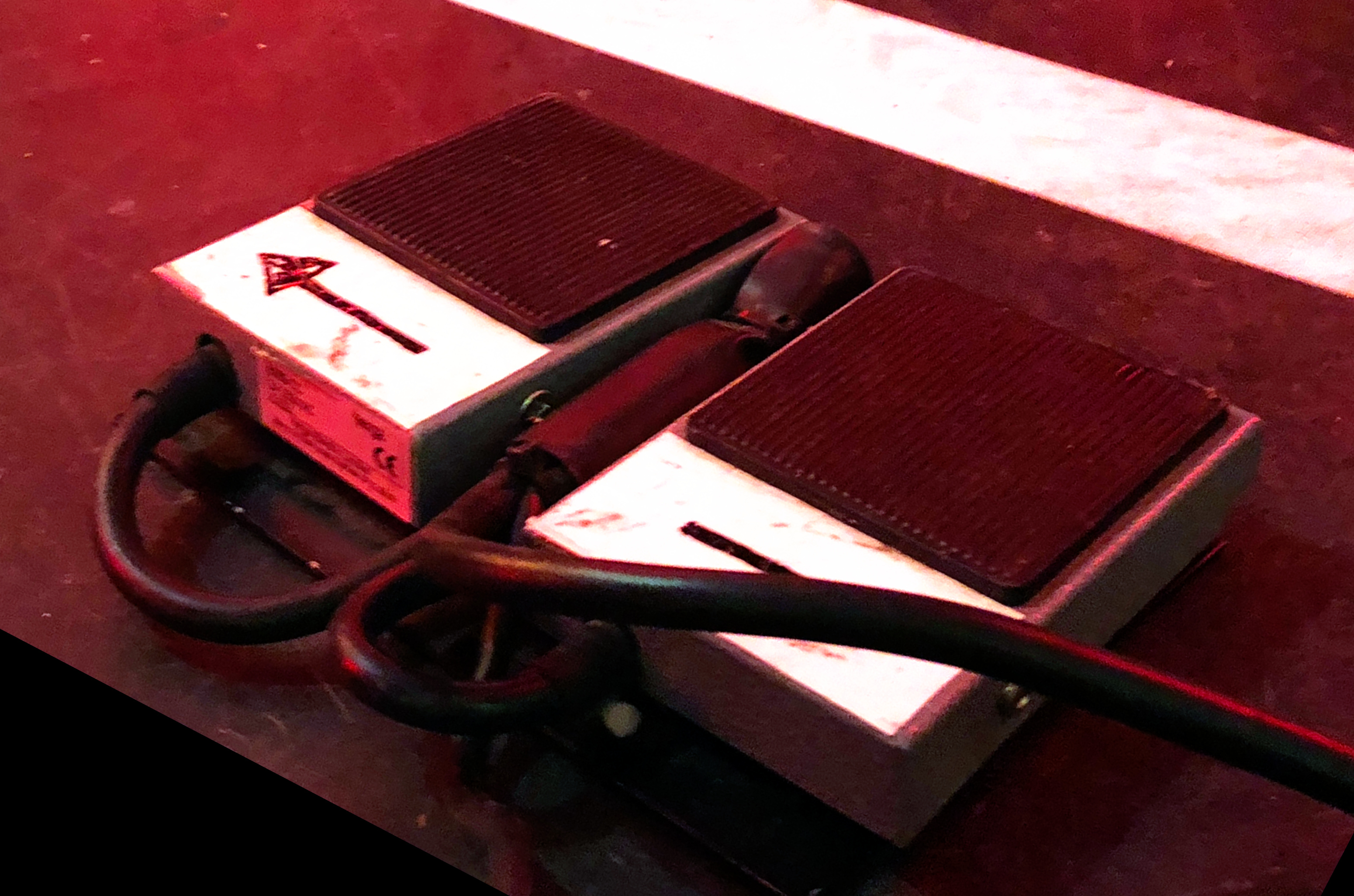
Foot switches used to switch octaves

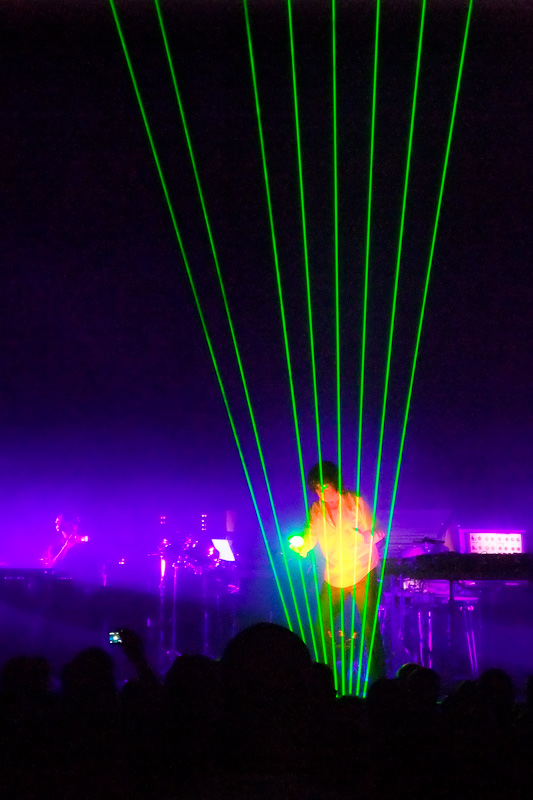
Jean-Michel Jarre playing the laser harp

Jean-Michel Jarre uses the laser harp in almost every concert, with the exception of Aero and the Oxygene 30th Anniversary Tour. He almost always uses it in the third part of Second Rendez-Vous, but has also used it for tracks like Third Rendez-Vous, Chronologie 3, Calypso 2, Oxygene 7 and Time Machine. The characteristic sound of the laser harp in Jean-Michel Jarre's performances comes from a factory preset on the Elka Synthex synthesizer.

During Jarre's 2009 In-Doors Arena Tour, he commented on his blog that he "should make a few intentional mistakes for people to really understand that it is live". Later the same day, at a concert in Helsinki, the harp "suddenly froze in Rendez Vous 2 for unknown reasons".

=== In art ===
Laser harps have appeared in a number of designs. They have also been used in public art installations, such as those by Jen Lewin at the Lincoln Center in 2000 and at Burning Man in 2005 and 2012, as well as those created by Johnny Dwork at the Harmony Festival in 2011, at the Portland Art Museum in 2012, at The Tech Museum of Innovation in 2014, and at the Oregon Museum of Science and Industry in 2015.

== See also ==
- Beamz
- Laser safety
