= Erik Truffaz =

French trumpeter

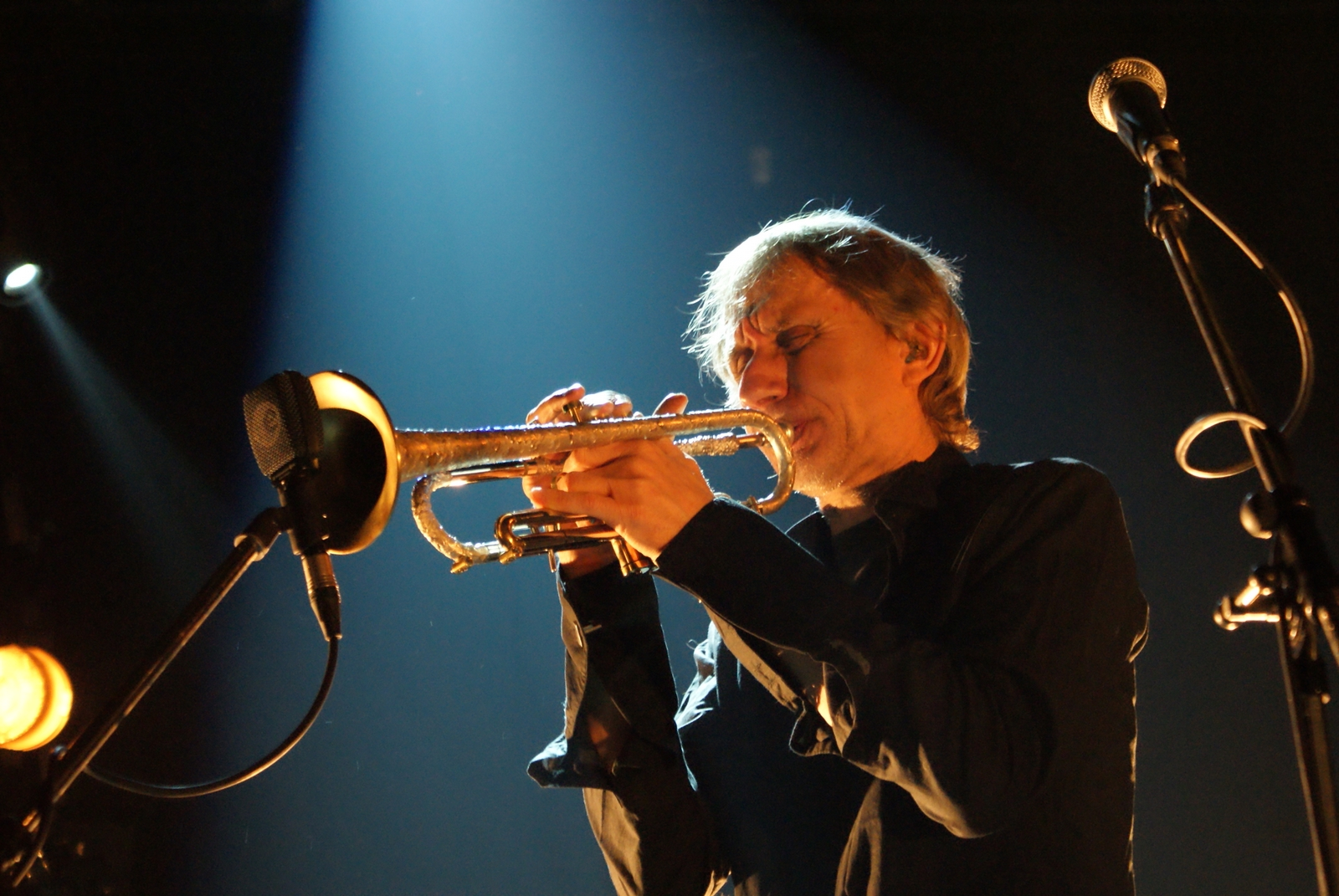

Background information
- Born: Erik Truffaz; 3 April 1960 (age 66); Chêne-Bougeries, Switzerland
- Origin: France, Switzerland
- Genres: Jazz fusion Acid jazz Nu-jazz; Post bop
- Occupations: Musician, band leader, composer
- Instrument: Trumpet
- Years active: 1990s–present
- Labels: Blue Note Records (current); EMI
- Formerly of: Erik Truffaz Ladyland Quartet

Erik Truffaz (born 3 April 1960 in Chêne-Bougeries, Switzerland) is a French-Swiss jazz trumpeter, infusing elements of hip hop, rock and roll and dance music into his compositions.

== Early life ==
Erik Truffaz grew up in France, in the Pays de Gex. He was introduced to music by his father, a saxophone player, played in his father's bands growing up, became a member of diverse local bands and later joined the orchestra of Collège Voltaire in Geneva. His father then got him admitted to the Chambéry conservatory where he discovered the world of jazz and blues and was inspired to study jazz after hearing Miles Davis' Kind Of Blue at 16 years old. He continued his studies at the Conservatoire de Genève, where he deepened his classical training and took part in jazz workshops, notably those of the Association for the Encouragement of Improvised Music.

This dual training in classical and jazz music played a key role in shaping his musical style, which blends elements from various genres such as acoustic music, jazz, rock, electro, drum and bass and many more.

== Career ==
In 1996, Truffaz signed with the French EMI label. Truffaz's second album on Blue Note, The Dawn, produced together with Patrick Muller, Marcello Giuliani and Mark Erbetta. Since then they have produced many Blue Note albums together such as Bending New Corners, which became a Silver Album in France. The 2007 release Arkhangelsk is a mixture of pop songs, French chanson, and jazz-groove.

== Discography ==
=== Albums ===
- Niña Valéria (as Erik Truffaz Quintet) (1992)
- Out of a Dream (1997)
- The Dawn (1998)
- Bending New Corners (1999)
- The Mask (2000)
- Mantis (2001)
- ReVisité (2001)
- The Walk of the Giant Turtle (2003)
- Saloua (2005)
- Arkhangelsk (2007)
- El tiempo de la Revolución (as Erik Truffaz Quartet) (2012)
- Doni Doni (as Erik Truffaz Quartet) (2016)
- Lune Rouge (as Erik Truffaz Quartet) (2019)
- Rollin' (2023)
- Clap! (2023)

=== Collaborations ===
- Tales Of The Lighthouse (with Off Course) (2002)
- Paris (with Sly Johnson) (2008)
- Benares (with Indrani & Apurba Mukherjee, Malcolm Braff) (2008)
- Mexico (with Murcof) (2008)
- Istanbul Sessions (with Ilhan Erşahin) (2010)
- In between (with Marcello Giuliani, Marc Erbetta, Benoît Corboz) (2010)
- Bahr (with Mashrou’ Leila) (2013)
- Being Human Being (with Murcof) (2014)
- Give Me November (with Krzysztof Kobyliński) (2017)

=== Other ===
- Magrouni (EP) (2002)
- Face-à-face (2CD Live + DVD) (2006)
