= Murcof =

Mexican musician

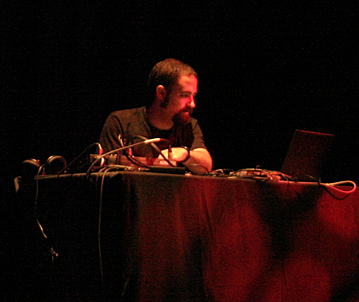
- Murcof performing at Sónar Festival, Barcelona, 15 June 2007

Background information
- Also known as: Terrestre
- Born: Fernando Corona Murillo; 26 July 1970 (age 56); Tijuana, Mexico
- Genres: Electronic; ambient; contemporary classical; glitch; minimal techno; IDM
- Occupations: Musician, record producer, mastering engineer
- Instruments: Laptop, piano, cello, synthesizer
- Years active: 2001-present
- Labels: Static Discos, The Leaf Label, Context, InFiné, Blue Note Records
- Website: www.murcof.com

Murcof is the performing and recording name of Mexican electronic musician Fernando Corona. Corona was born in 1970 in Tijuana, Mexico and raised in Ensenada. He was for a time a member of the Tijuana-based Nortec Collective of electronic musicians under the Terrestre project name. In 2000, he returned to Tijuana. Since 2006, Corona has been living in Barcelona, Spain.

== Music ==
Murcof's music is sparse, minimalist electronic music. Many of his compositions are founded on abstract, glitchy, sometimes complex electronic percussion. Harmonic and melodic influences come from classical music (modern classical music, musique concrète, holy minimalism, micropolyphony, baroque music, etc.), ambient music, drone music, berlin school synthesizer music, ethnic music and free improvisation. Rhythms are derived from minimal techno, dub, glitch, industrial music and IDM, and are often aligned around a 4/4 beat. The more recent works in the Murcof catalogue no longer include electronic beats.

His earlier works, like the 2001 EP Monotonu, feature orchestral instruments sampled from recordings of works by modern composers such as Arvo Pärt and Morton Feldman. Some of his later works, like the 2005 album Remembranza, incorporate samples of Corona and his friends playing classical instruments. Besides his personally initiated albums, Corona worked as Murcof on the 2008 commission project The Versailles Sessions, in which he reinterpreted recordings of a baroque ensemble. Live shows of Murcof featured guest musicians from varied musical backgrounds, like jazz trumpet player Erik Truffaz, tabla player Talvin Singh, crossover electronica-classical pianist Francesco Tristano and contemporary composer Philippe Petit.

== Biography and influences ==
=== Early youth (1970) ===
Murcof was born as Fernando Corona in 1970 in Tijuana, Baja California, Mexico. His earliest contact with music came from his home, where his father sang, played bass and accordion. Corona tried some of these instruments as his father bought a very cheap organ for him and his sister. He began to wonder how these sounds were made, becoming primarily interested in the sound design aspect of music. His father's record collection included Bach, The Beatles and The Carpenters. His mother listened more to traditional Mexican music. Corona was taught by his father to pay attention to the compositions and arrangements of both classical and pop music, which helped him to better understand what elements in music he liked or not.

On his eight-year (1978) he moved to Chula Vista, close to the United States border. He went to school and learned English across the U.S. border, in San Diego. A few years later (around 1980) he moved 100 miles south, to a small port called Ensenada.

At the age of eleven (1981) Corona was introduced to electronic music by a friend of his father's who gave him a tape of Jean Michel Jarre's Oxygène. Soon afterwards he got fascinated by electronic‐classical crossover through a present from his father, an album on which Jon Santos plays Bach on a classic Moog synthesizer. This resulted in him purchasing other electronic music from artist such as the Berlin School synthesizer gurus Tangerine Dream, Japanese electronica composer Isao Tomita and Mexican ethnic crossover (new age) composers Jorge Reyes and Antonio Zepada (link in Spanish). The US was Corona's "window to the world", as he had to cross the US border to obtain records and magazines.

=== First electronic instruments (1985) ===
Around his fifteenth Corona started to play music, taking piano and music theory lessons from 1985 to 1989. He bought his first keyboard in 1985, one out of the Casio Sample Keyboard series, which made him excited as he could use it to record and transform snippets of everyday sounds.

For a while Corona enjoyed an alternative club in Tijuana, called Iguanas. There he developed a taste for mid 80s industrial (Play It Again Sam, Wax Trax! Records and Nettwerk labels, Skinny Puppy, Front 242, Front Line Assembly, KMFDM, and In The Nursery) and synthpop (e.g. Depeche Mode’s A Broken Frame (1982) and Black Celebration (1986)).

Around 1988 Corona acquired some more sophisticated equipment. His first professional keyboard was a synthesizer, the Kawai K1. Corona was "blown away" by the concept of designing his own sounds with oscillators and waveforms. He also began to program sounds on the Commodore 64. He started to write his own compositions influenced by techno pop (e.g. Kraftwerk), acid house and industrial. He continued in that style by forming the live act Vortex together with two of his friends. The group was active from 1988 to 1991.

Besides electronic music Corona was also listening pre‐1900 classical music during his whole teens. His uncle employed him as a warehouse manager around the mid 80s. In 1988 he started his study to become a computer programmer, but dropped out in 1990. By then he was focusing on DJing with his mobile DJ system and later as a resident DJ in a club in Ensenada. From 1992 to 2000 he worked in a nursing agency that dealt primarily with the elderly and terminally ill in San Diego (US).

=== Prog-rock (1991) ===
In this period of time Corona played keys (and occasionally guitar, drums and flute) in the rock band Sonios, which was first influenced by British pop music like The Smiths, but later went into the direction of prog rock, jazz fusion, ambient and post rock. Corona states that this was a learning school for him about the various elements of music. He took influences from the local rock scene. The 1998 Sonios album ‘200 Fonios’ was released on Tijuana indie label Nimboestatic, won various prizes from cultural institutions in the Baja California region, was rated one of the best rock albums of 1998 by the Mexican press and reached a cult status in many places of Mexico and Latin America.

=== Electro-acoustic projects (1994) ===
Whilst in Sonios, Corona also engaged in other musical co‐operations like Elohim (1994‐1995), an experimental multimedia group, and Arvoles (1995‐1997), an acoustic‐ambient crossover project including a female vocalist. Then Corona got to compose for modern dance ensembles in Ensenada, an experience that led him to develop a taste for modern academic music, from the dodecaphonism and minimalism of the early 20th century to the experimentalists and serialists of the mid-1900s. Also, he grew tired of pre‐1900 classical music having listened to it for all his teens and adolescence. Upon hearing Xenakis’ Oresteia, plus later Pleiades and Metastasis, as well as Ligeti’s Lux Aeterna his perception of music altered immediately and drastically.

Some of the other composers he became interested in where Igor Stravinsky, Wolfgang Rihm, Giya Kancheli, Arnold Schoenberg, Morton Feldman, Giacinto Scelsi, Sofia Gubaidulina, Alfred Schnittke, Luciano Berio, Krzysztof Penderecki, Stefano Scodanibbio (piece: Voyage That Never Ends).

Corona took his electronic experiments in a more extreme direction, playing with feedback effects to create walls of noise. He began to digitally process samples of classical music and mix them up with doom metal, death metal, ambient and noise.

Non‐classical music he listened to at that time included Steve Roach’s dark ambient record The Magnificent Void (1996), Squarepusher’s mix of jazz, D&B and acid (IDM) on Hard Normal Daddy (1997), and the then-emerging glitch genre from the Raster-Noton label (formed in 1990 by Alva Noto, Frank Bretschneider and Olaf Benders (byetone)). He also listened to the ambient noise of Deathprod (active from 1994) and the Icelandic post‐rock band Sigur Rós (active since 1997).

Corona studied cello at the Centro de Estudios Musicales in Ensenada in the years 1993 and 1994. In 1995 and 1996 Corona had private lessons in audio engineering in Ensenada, Baja California, Mexico. In 1998 and 1998 he studied audio engineering and music arrangement at Harper's Music, Chula Vista, California, US.

=== Terrestre and Nortec (1999) ===
Early 1999 Corona leaves Sonios to fully focus on his solo electronic project Terrestre, for which his goal was to bring together the worlds of ambient electronica, pre‐Hispanic music and other ethnic sounds. For this project Corona sampled from vinyl records in the styles of tambora (small bass drum music), danzón (traditional Cuban dance music which also flourishes in Mexico) and salsa (the broad and internationally used term for popular Cuban dance music like Cuban son montuno, guaracha, chachachá, mambo, bolero, etc.). In a later period of 1999 he gets an e‐mail from three Tijuana based electronic musicians (Fusible, Bostich and Panoptica) inviting electronic musicians to work with some norteña and tambora tracks downloaded from a studio in Tijuana. This way he became a part of the team of electronic musicians, DJs and graphic artists who would soon develop the Nortec Collective. Nortec's objective is to blend traditional Mexican norteño‐tex‐mex border culture with electronic dance music and visual projections. It grew from being a local phenomenon to getting some worldwide recognition (e.g. by Time Magazine, NY Times).

=== Murcof - "MF Relay" / Martes / Monotonu (2001) ===
In 2001, during his Terrestre activities, Corona's Murcof project comes alive out of the need to explore modern classical territories, like the holy minimalism of Henryk Górecki and Arvo Pärt and the post‐modern atmosphere of Valentyn Sylvestrov. In 2002, whilst experimenting with digital effects on samples of Arvo Pärt and Morton Feldman he creates his first Murcof track: "MF Relay", a track with glitchy minimal techno percussion, a synth drone and "sliced and diced" samples from orchestral percussion, choir, piano, strings and woodwinds.

Somewhere around here Corona started to listen to Deathprod’s electro‐acoustic free improv (jazz) band Supersilent, particularly their releases 4 (1998) and in later times 6 (2003) and 7 (2005). He also took influences from Oren Ambarchi (a musician in the free improv and noise spectrum) and ambient/dub/electronica producer Biosphere.

Martes, the first Murcof album, came out in the year Corona became a father. With this album Corona continued to work in the MF Relay style of minimal dance rhythms interwoven with samples from holy minimalism and other modern classical sources. Corona later stated that the composing wasn’t a hard job for him: "It almost composed itself".

Corona left Nortec in 2002. He then teamed up with artists and personal friends Rubén Tamayo (Fax) and Eji Val (Ejival) from Nimboestatic (the label that released Sonios ‐ 200 Fonios) to create the Electronic label Static Discos, which in 2002 released Martes as a CD in Mexico.

Corona was at Barcelona's Sónar Festival in 2001 to perform with the Nortec Collective when a friend of his insisted he would give his Murcof demo CD to Tony Marley of UK based independent record label The Leaf Label. So he went to meet Tony in a club and gave him the demo. This led to the worldwide vinyl and CD release of Martes, three months after its Mexican CD debut with Static Discos. The pioneering "MF Relay" track did not become a part of Martes, but was published, also in 2002, by Context Free Media (label by multidisciplinary artist Seth Joshua Horvitz) on the Monotónu 12”. Martes received an almost instant universal praise from well-known magazines like The Wire UK and consecutively Murcof got to play at festivals like Montreal's Mutek and the next edition of Sónar.

Martes was reissued by The Leaf Label in 2015 as part of the label's 20th anniversary celebrations. This was a special triple LP release combining the original album with unreleased tracks and the 2004 album Utopia.

=== Terrestre commissions (2002) ===
A friend of Corona's, Argentinian Latin‐crossover composer and multi-instrumentalist Gustavo Santaolalla, was involved in the production of Nuevo, an album of Mexican compositions performed by modern classical string ensemble Kronos Quartet. Santaolalla asked Nortec to get involved, resulting in Terrestre finding its spot on the 2002 Nortec remix EP of Kronos Quartet ‐ El Sinaloense.

Corona also got commissioned to remix Miles Davis.

Later Corona moved into the domain of film scores when he got commissioned as Terrestre to compose the soundtrack of the film Nicotina, a dark comedy by the producers of one of Mexico's biggest ever films, Amores Perros. The film was released in 2003 and the CD came out in 2004.

Other commissions included music for a Heineken commercial focused on the Latin American market (US, 2002), an Edwin Jeans commercial (JP, 2002) the documentary Iraq - Counting the Cost (UK, 2004), a trailer for the Edinburgh Film Festival (UK, 2004), Barratt Urban Development (US, 2004), Valencia Biennale (2003).

Mexican electronica netlabels Mandorla, Cyan Recs, Umor Rex and Soundsister caught Corona's around this time attention.

=== Murcof - Ulysses / Utopía (2003) ===
In 2003 followed another Murcof release on The Leaf Label, the Ulysses EP. Corona's focus began to shift from sampling records to recording musicians, the violin and double bass on this record were recorded from Tijuana musicians, giving parts of the music a more live feel.

Utopía saw the daylight in 2004 when it was published as a CD by The Leaf Label. This album came to realization as a result of the success of Martes. It contained seven remixes and four new Murcof tracks. Corona has stated that it was exciting and inspiring for him to select people to remix his works. He also called Utopía a self-indulgent record. On his four new tracks he experimented with placing the aesthetics of Martes into less conventional structures. Corona later claimed to be extremely proud of this record and to regularly relisten it. He sees Utopía as an important transition from the Martes style into the style of his upcoming album Remembranza.

The remixers were Sutekh (Californian multimedia artist Seth Joshua Horvitz (Sutekh) of Context Free Media), Jan Jelinek (German experimental minimalist who released on labels such as Berlin's ~scape), Deathprod (Norwegian ambient noise composer Helge Sten, who earlier produced Motorpsycho), Icarus (UK based experimental electronica duo Ollie Bown and Sam Britton), Fax (Ruben Alonso Tamayo, Mexican minimal techno producer and co‐founder of Static Discos), Aeroc (Geoff White, melodic IDM producer releasing on the renowned electronica label Ghostly International) and Colleen (the French Cécile Schott, sample transforming and cello playing colleague from The Leaf Label).

=== Terrestre - Secondary Inspection (2004) ===
It took Corona from 1999 to 2004 to release his first full-length Terrestre record. Secondary Inspection became a creepy mix of electronic dance music, Latin percussion and ambient electronics. It contained processed sounds of Tijuana street musicians, which Corona "reduced to a pulp of post 9/11 paranoia".

=== Murcof - Remembranza (2005) ===
The second full-length Murcof album, Remembranza, came out in 2005 and helped Corona cope with the turmoil of his mother dying. Remembranza was produced during her illness until her death and became a requiem for her. The Murcof aesthetic moved a bit away from minimalism towards more complex and melancholic harmonic progressions, slightly reminiscent of his prog-rock past. Recordings of his friends or himself playing classical instruments played a significant role on this album. Corona stated that he could hardly play them, but that did not bother him too much as he was mainly interested in texture and vibe.

In 2005 Native Instruments released the sample pack Synthetic Drums 2 for use with their software drum instrument Battery or software sampler Kontakt. It included samples by Speedy J, Jake Mandell, Plaid, Telefon Tel Aviv, Atom Heart, Murcof and other artists.

=== Live with Singh, Truffaz and Tristano (2006) ===
A trio with Talvin Singh on tabla and Erik Truffaz was formed in this year. Both of these artists had a firm background in acoustic‐electronic crossover. The trio played sporadically in the following years, at for example Montreux Jazz 2006 and in Mumbai in 2010.

Corona got to master the album Not For Piano by Luxembourg crossover electronic‐classical pianist/synthesist Francesco Tristano. In 2007 Corona and Tristano started the Not For Piano live duo, which for example toured the UK in 2010.

=== Murcof - Cosmos (2007) ===
In 2007 Corona released the third Murcof album Cosmos. It was a spacious dark ambient record which included dense walls of textures (hinting at Ligeti), abstracted sounds of synth pioneers, intense climaxes and on some tracks glitchy dub and techno beats. Corona stated that it expressed some personal changes in his life, including his move from Ensenada to Barcelona in 2006. Before moving to Europe, Corona sold his hardware instruments, including a Roland Juno‐106 and Moog Prodigy. Corona described the album as follows: "Cosmos is a celebration of our existence, of the universe: we must see beyond the skyscrapers around us, look above, look the star and the sky."

=== Murcof - The Versailles Sessions (2008) ===
In the summer of 2007 Corona was invited by Les Grandes Eaux Nocturnes (an annual festival of sound, light and water at Château de Versailles in France) to compose a 6 speaker composition for the grand evening fountain display in the Jardin du Roi. The Versaille Sessions is an aural document of that installation. GetSound, who commissioned the project, hired a Parisian group of musicians specialized in baroque music. Murcof and the musicians resided in the GetSound studio in Paris for two days to record the musicians’ interpretations of compositions from the baroque time, from for example Jean-Baptiste Lully, Henry Purcell and François Couperin. The pieces were played traditionally as well as with note and instrument experimentation. They experimented with modifying the score, tempo, pitch and by inserting random pauses. Texturally they explored the instruments by throwing all sorts of material inside the harpsichord and pounding on the viola da gamba's body, capturing a wide range of timbres, giving Corona many composing options. Corona stated it was a great learning experience for him thanks to the musicians’ open mindedness and fun approach. Corona described the composition process as partially different from the usual Murcof composition method. He was processing previously recorded acoustic material as usual, but this time the source material was very specific 17th century baroque and the experiments in the studio were already a part of the composing process. Two weeks before the opening Corona went to the site wanting to get an impression of the sound, but could not make the necessary tests due to pouring rain. He did realize though that he was going in the wrong musical direction. He thought the big space demanded a different sound: more openness, more time for the sounds to develop and resonate. So in the remaining two weeks he reworked the whole commission into The Versailles Sessions.

=== Projects with AntiVJ (2008) ===
Early 2008 Corona was commissioned by the Contemporary Music Network of England to create the live audio-visual Océano show for a UK tour. "Blackout Arts" member Flicker (Roderick Maclachlan) created visuals live on stage by using camera feeds from micro-installations of dust, smoke, plants, dark water and live scratch animations. He used feedback effects to manipulate the video and his visuals responded to the music. Live instrumentation was served by Spanish classical ensemble BCN 216 and consisted of cello, viola and trombone.

June 2008 Corona played a space themed audio-video show in The Planetarium of Bristol, during the Venn Festival. Visuals were improvised by Joanie Lemercier of visual arts label AntiVJ.

=== Infographic overview of Corona's music making history ===
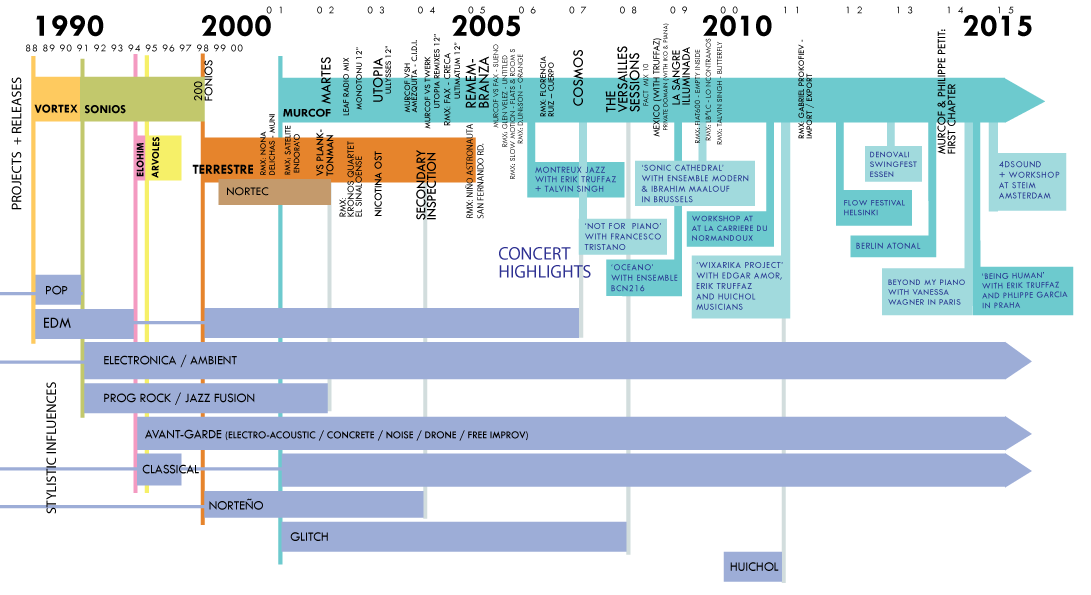
Infographic of Corona's musical history.

== Discography ==
=== Albums ===
- Martes (2002) (Static Discos (Mexico)/Leaf (UK/US))
- Utopia (2004) (Leaf)
- Martes/Utopía (2005) (Static Discos) (Mexico only double CD)
- Remembranza (2005) (Leaf)
- Cosmos (2007) (Leaf)
- The Versailles Sessions (2008) (Leaf)
- La Sangre Iluminada (2009) (Intolerancia) (soundtrack)
- Being Human Being (2014) (with Erik Truffaz) (Mundo Recordings)
- Lost in Time (2014) (Casino Luxembourg) (soundtrack)
- Statea (2016) (with Vanessa Wagner) (InFiné)
- The Alias Sessions (2021) (Leaf)
- The Etna Sessions (2024) (Facade Electronics)
- Twin Color, Vol. I (2024) (InFiné)

=== Singles/EPs ===
- Monotonu (2002) (Context Free Media)
- Ulyssess (2003) (Leaf)
- Utopia Remixes (2004) (Leaf)
- Ultimatum (2004) (Leaf)
- Mexico (2008) (with Erik Truffaz) (Blue Note, EMI Music (France))
- First Chapter (2013) (with Philippe Petit) (Aagoo Records, REV. Laboratories)
- EP01 (2016) (with Vanessa Wagner) (InFiné)
- EP02 (2017) (with Vanessa Wagner) (InFiné)
- EP03 (2017) (with Vanessa Wagner) (InFiné)
- Static Discos 100 (2019) (with Fax) (Static Discos (Mexico))
- Twin Color (Extended Play No. 1) (2022) (InFiné)
- Twin Color (Extended Play No. 2) (2025) (InFiné)

== See also ==
- List of ambient music artists
