= InFiné =

French electronic record label

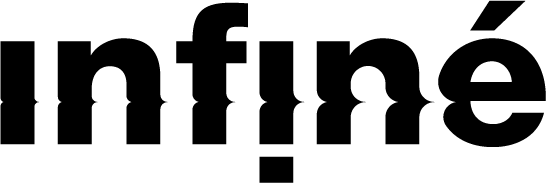
- Founded: 2006
- Founder: Agoria; Alexandre Cazac; Yannick Matray
- Genre: Electronic Music; Intelligent Dance Music; Contemporary classical music
- Country of origin: France
- Location: Paris, Lyon, Berlin
- Official website: infine-music.com

InFiné is a French record label founded by Alexandre Cazac and Yannick Matray. Initially focused on electronic music, the label's representations has branched out into classical music, ambient, club and pop.

== History ==
The idea of the label InFiné came true in February 2005 when Alexandre Cazac attended a concert by Francesco Tristano at Théâtre des Bouffes du Nord in Paris. The pianist covered "Strings of Life", an essential founding track of Detroit techno music, produced by Derrick May. Following this discovery, Alexandre Cazac and Yannick Matray founded their own label to sign Francesco Tristano and release his debut album Not For Piano. As a result, the label InFiné was officially established on January 2, 2006.

The label was formally begun in January 2006 when Sebastien Devaud and Yannick Matray joined Alexandre Cazac. Their first release was "Strings of Life" interpreted by Francesco Tristano, with remixes from the German producers Apparat and Kiki.

In 2007, Julien Gagnebien went into partnership with InFiné and opened an office in Berlin in an effort to make the label an international concern. In the same year, Sebastien Devaud (a.k.a.Agoria) left the label to focus on his DJ career.

In October 2008, InFiné organized at la Cité de la Musique in Paris one of the first meeting between a classical ensemble and artists from the electronic music scene, called Versus. The project brought together producer Carl Craig, Moritz Von Oswald and the philharmonic orchestra Les Siècles directed by François-Xavier Roth for a pgram with compositions from Steve Reich, Bruno Mantovani and pieces by Carl Craig arranged and interpreted by the pianist Francesco Tristano.

In 2011, InFiné is the first label was invited to Gaîté Lyrique in Paris and put concerts, parties and a multimedia event for a week. Later, in 2015, Francesco Tristano and Bruce Brubaker performed a 2-piano show at Gaîté Lyrique that was broadcast live on Arte.

InFiné regularly cooperates with IRCAM. Aaffiliated artists are implicated in the research in the field of sound design. It was even the first label to produce a musical session in virtual reality via Oculus Rift. In early November 2014, the label announced the release of a new Rone album, Creatures, to be released on February 9, 2015 on Infiné.

In 2015, Alexandre Cazac was involved in the Stems' panel for Native Instruments at Sonar Festival in Barcelona as long as Carl Craig, Luciano and Kerri Chandler, who debated about the new audio format created by Native Instruments, and the way it can redefine DJ practice and live music performance.

The annual Workshop InFiné at la Carrière du Normandoux takes near Poitiers in France. Since 2009, based around music and art projects. This is how collaborations between Vanessa Wagner and Murcof, Charlemagne Palestine and Mondkopf, or Bernard Szajner, Yro Yto and Almeeva took place.

== Artists ==
- Almeeva
- Apparat
- Arandel
- Aufgang
- Bachar Mar-Khalifé
- Bruce Brubaker
- Clara Moto
- Composer
- Cubenx
- Danton Eeprom
- Don Nino
- Donso
- Douglas Greed
- Downlines Sekt
- Fraction
- Francesco Tristano
- Gordon
- jozif
- Murcof
- Outer Fall
- Oxia
- Pedro Soler & Gaspar Claus
- Rone
- Spitzer
- The Hacker
- The Same
- We:Mantra
- Z aka Bernard Szajner

== Discography ==
=== LPs ===
- iF1001 Francesco Tristano - Not For Piano
- iF1002 Apparat - Walls (sorti en France seulement)
- iF1003 Apparat - Things to be Frickled (sorti France seulement)
- iF1004 Francesco Tristano - Auricle Bio /On
- iF1005 Rone - Spanish Breakfast
- iF1006 Aufgang - Aufgang
- iF1007 Danton Eeprom - Yes Is More
- iF1008 Clara Moto - Polyamour
- iF1009 Arandel - In D
- iF1010 Aufgang - Air On Fire
- iF1011 Bachar Mar-Khalifé - Oil Slick
- iF1012 Francesco Tristano - Idiosynkrasia
- iF1013 Agoria - Impermanence
- iF1014 Murcof - La Sangre Iluminada
- iF1015 Pedro Soler & Gaspar Claus - Barlande
- iF1016 Composer - The Edges Of The World
- iF1017 Cubenx - On Your Own Again
- iF1018 Oxia - Tides of Mind
- iF1020 Rone - Tohu Bohu
- iF1022 Bachar Mar-Khalifé - Who's Gonna Get The Ball From Behind The Wall Of The Garden Today ?
- iF1023 Aufgang - Istiklaliya
- iF1025 Rone - Tohu Bonus
- iF1026 Clara Moto - Blue Distance
- iF1027 Danton Eeprom - If Looks Could Kill
- iF1028 Downliners Sekt - Silent Ascent
- iF1029 Z aka Bernard Szajner - Visions of Dune
- iF1030 Arandel - Solarispellis
- iF1031 Rone - Creatures
- iF1032 Bruce Brubaker - Glass Piano

=== Compilations ===
- iF3002 Introducing InFiné
- iF3005 Balance Unreleased - Selected by Agoria
- iF3008 Remixing InFiné
- iF3009 InFiné Premasters
- iF3017 InFiné Exclusive
- iF3024 If We Pop
- iF3038 InFiné Explorer #1
