= Bernard Szajner =

French composer and inventor (1944–2026)

- Born: 27 June 1944 (age 82); Grenoble, France
- Died: 31 August 2026 La Rochelle, France
- Genre: Electronic music
- Instrument: Laser harp (inventor)
- Years active: 1970s – 2023

Bernard Szajner (27 June 1944 – 31 August 2026) was a French composer, musical theorist, visual artist. He is credited with the invention of the laser harp, which he patented.

== Early life ==
Bernard Szajner was born in Grenoble, France, on 27 June 1944 into a family of Polish Jews who had been exiled from Nazi-occupied Poland to Germany, and then, due to rise of Nazism and antisemitism, to France. He was given the name "Wolf" and spent his earlier times hidden in a cellar. During his childhood, he'd heard of the stories of his uncle who had been sent to Auschwitz concentration camp and had disappeared. His experience would go on to influence his musical composition later in life.

== Musical and artistic career ==
Between 1979 and 1983, Szajner released five albums of innovative and Avant-garde electronic music. He became renowned as a light and visual effects technician with artists such as Magma, Gong, Stomu Yamashta and The Who.

During the 1970s, he became a pioneer in the field of using laser technology as an artistic tool. As a measure of his success, he became renowned for his work with companies such as Cartier and Renault. In 1980, inspired by the novel, Nova, by Samuel R. Delany, he first created the laser harp. The laser harp became so successful that Jean-Michel Jarre ordered a version from Bernard Szajner for his tour of China. Despite all this, Szajner would only occasionally use this instrument in his own performances. He has stated that he would rather the public not know him solely for his work on the laser harp, and that it not be allowed to take precedence over his work in musical composition that it enabled. This is also why he continued to develop other instruments which use other innovative methods of interaction, such as tactile or holographic.

Towards the end of the 1980s and disgusted with the music industry, he chose to abandon music entirely, and shifted his focus towards digital and visual arts, and theatre.

== Death ==
Szajner died in La Rochelle, France, on 31 August 2026.

== Discography ==
- 1979, Visions of Dune, Pathé/EMI
  Released under the group name Zed. Szajner's first album was inspired by the novel, Dune, by Frank Herbert and introduced musicians such as Hahn Rowe and Klaus Blasquiz.
- 1980, Some Deaths Take Forever, Pathé/EMI
  Inspired by the experiences of two prisoners on Death Row, part of this album was used as a soundtrack to a short film by Amnesty International. Klaus Blasquiz and Bernard Paganotti also collaborated on this work.
- 1981, Superficial Music, IRC
- 1981, Back to the Burner / Back to Siberia, Epic
- 1982, Wallenberg, Hypothetical records
- 1983, Around the World, Epic
- 1983, Brute Reason, Island Records
- 1984, The Big Scare, New Rose
- 1986, Indécent Délit, New Rose

== Performances ==
- 1981, Laser Harp performance at the Festival of Science-Fiction and Imagination, Metz
- 2012, No Concert or C-Tunes, a collaboration with Yro
- 2013, The Conference of the Birds, a further collaboration with Yro
