= Night Ride (2020 film) =

2020 Norwegian short film

- Directed by: Eirik Tveiten
- Written by: Eirik Tveiten
- Produced by: Gaute Lid Larssen; Heidi Arnesen
- Starring: Sigrid Kandal Husjord; Ola Hoemsnes Sandum; Axel Barø Aasen; Jon Vegard Hovdal
- Cinematography: Vegard Landsverk
- Edited by: Geir Fjermestad Rolandsen
- Music by: Morten Rognskog
- Production company: Cylinder Production
- Release date: 2020
- Running time: 15 minutes
- Country: Norway
- Language: Norwegian

Night Ride (Norwegian: Nattrikken) is a 2020 Norwegian short film written and directed by Eirik Tveiten.

== Summary ==
Ebba, who has dwarfism, waits for a tram to arrive. When it does, the conductor leaves for the restroom and prevents her from boarding without him being present. Due to the cold weather, Ebba sneaks onboard anyway, and curiously plays with the conductor's controls trying to close the doors. When she accidentally causes the tram to move, she decides to keep going in order to avoid reprisal from the outraged conductor.

At the next stop, the passengers include a rude young man, Allan, his friend Benjamin, and Ariel, a trans woman. An oblivious Allan flirts with Ariel, but becomes upset upon learning Ariel's gender identity, and is outraged by the presumption that Ariel was trying to trick him into sex. Allan and Benjamin begin harassing Ariel, and despite Ariel's pleas for help, an intimidated Ebba at first ignores the confrontation. However, after Ariel flees to try to get off the tram, Ebba regains her courage and stands up to the two men, ignoring Allan's cutting remarks about her own physical appearance. Ebba tricks Allan into driving the tram and departs with Ariel, leaving the rest of the passengers shocked.

As the tram pulls away with Allan at the controls, Ebba sits with Ariel at a nearby bench, and the two bond. They witness a police car chasing after the delinquent tram, and they exchange a smile, knowing that Allan will soon get his comeuppance.

== Accolades ==
The film was nominated for the 2023 Academy Award for Best Live Action Short Film.

== Cast ==
- Ebba: Sigrid Husjord
- Ariel: Ola Hoemsnes Sandum
- Allan: Axel Barø Aasen
- Trikkefører: Øyvind Uhlving
