= Agoria (musician) =

French record producer

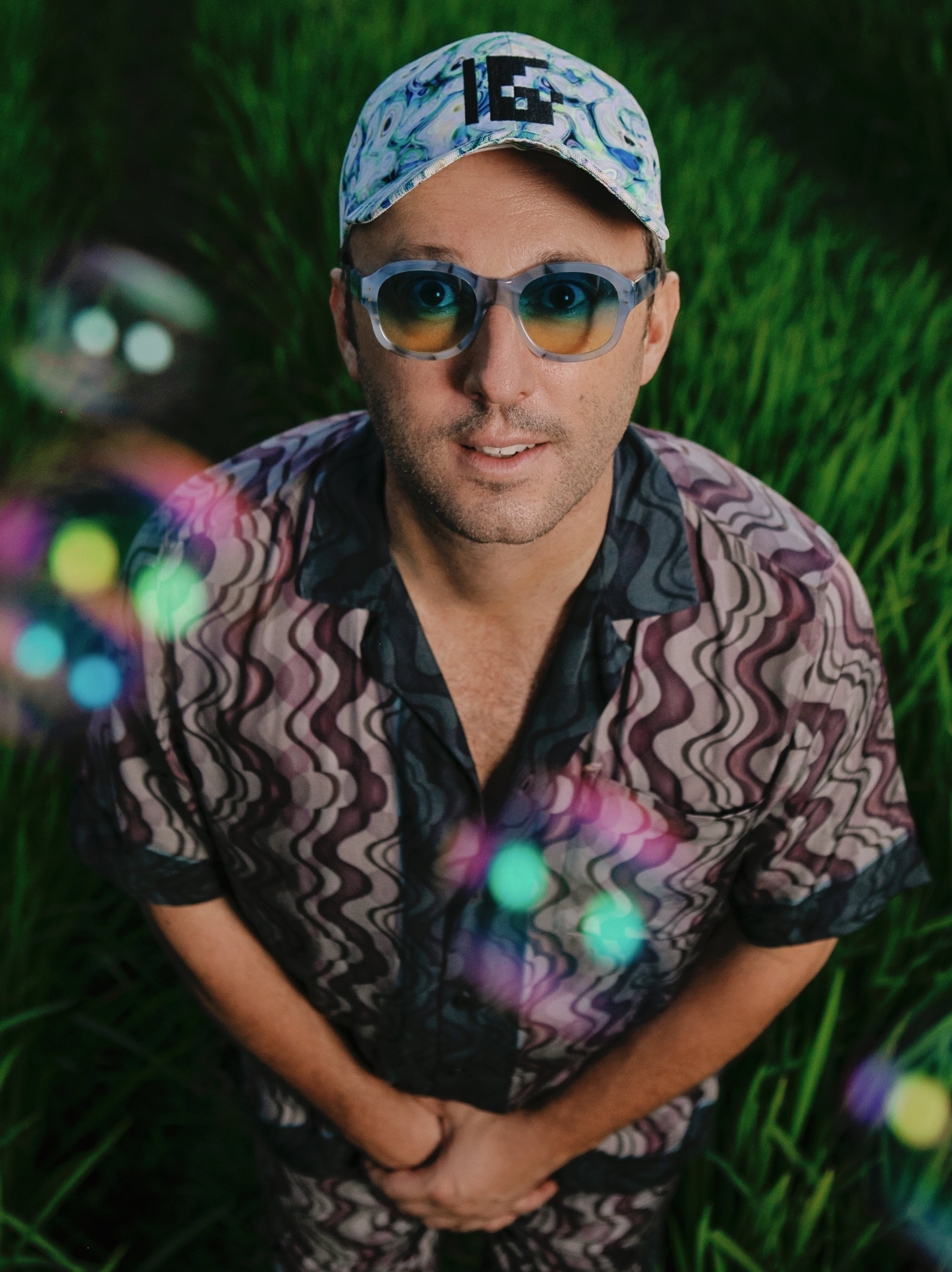

Background information
- Born: Sébastien Devaud; 16 January 1976 (age 50)
- Occupation: Artist
- Labels: Different Recordings, PIAS, Infiné, Sapiens Records
- Website: agoria.dev

Agoria, born Sébastien Devaud (born 16 January 1976) is a French electronic record producer, composer, and DJ. He has released four albums, including the soundtrack to the film Go Fast. He is one of the founders of the record label InFiné and also helped to create the music festival Nuits Sonores.
