= Nuits Sonores =

Electronic music festival in Lyon, France

Coordinates: 45.7673°N 4.8342°E

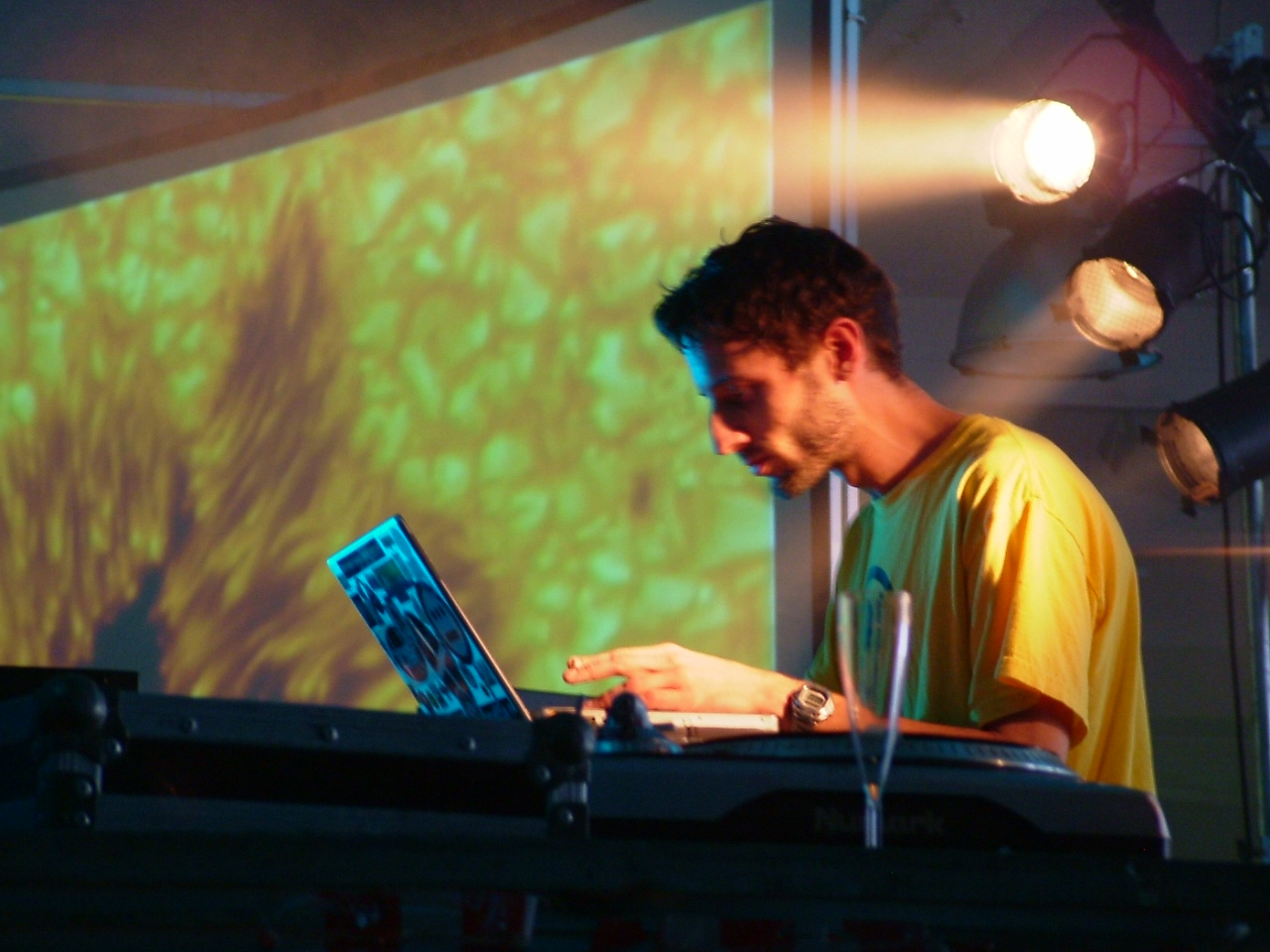
- Genre: Electronic music
- Dates: Yearly, five days in May
- Locations: Lyon, France
- Years active: 2003–present
- Website: nuits-sonores.com

Nuits Sonores (French: [nɥi sɔnɔʁ]) is an electronic music festival in Lyon, France. It usually occurs for five days in May. It has been held since 2003 and is organized by the Arty Farty organization.

The festival is set within the city of Lyon itself, in public spaces, old industrial wastelands, small venues and sometimes in historical buildings.

Throughout the years, major electronic music artists came to Lyon to perform at the festival: Ben Klock, Ellen Allien, Pedro Winter, Kraftwerk, Goldie, The Blessed Madonna, Nina Kraviz, Four Tet, Floating Points, Laurent Garnier, Blawan, Jamie XX, Carl Craig, The Chemical Brothers, Mala (Digital Mystikz), Kerri Chandler, Skrillex, Autechre, as well as Fatboy Slim.

Massive Attack, Robert Hood, Jeff Mills and Cassius (among others) were announced to play for the 2025 festival.

== Gallery ==
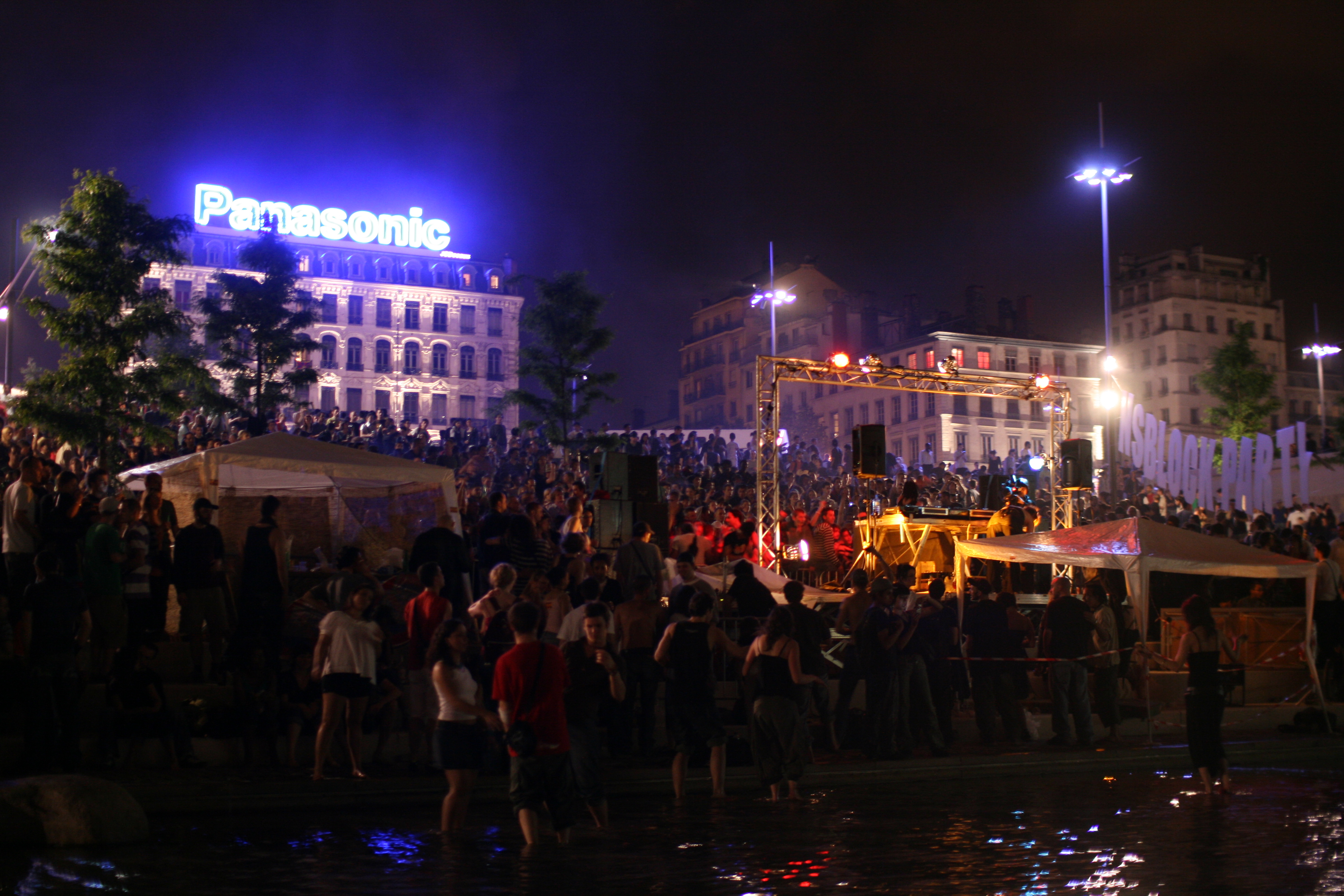

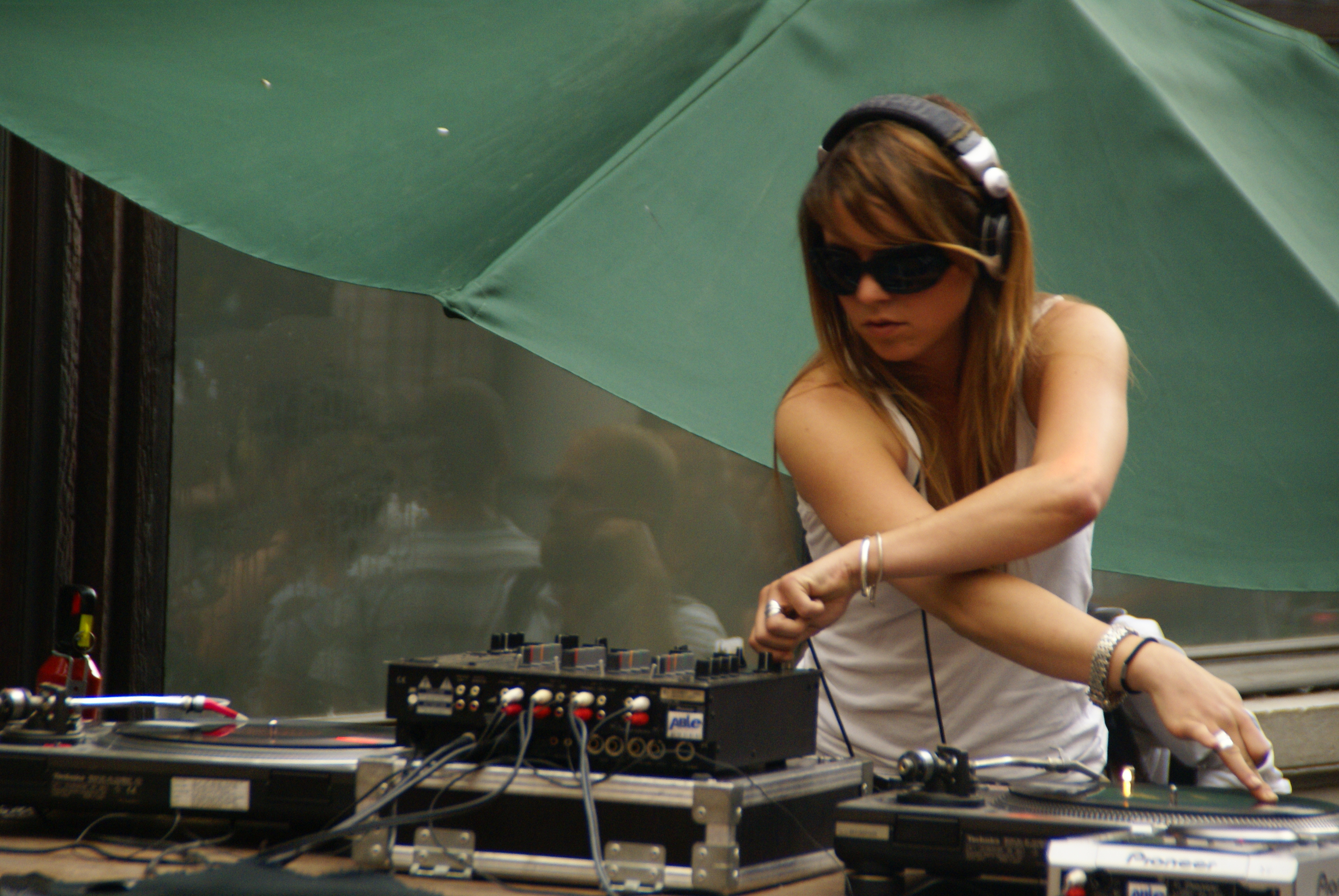

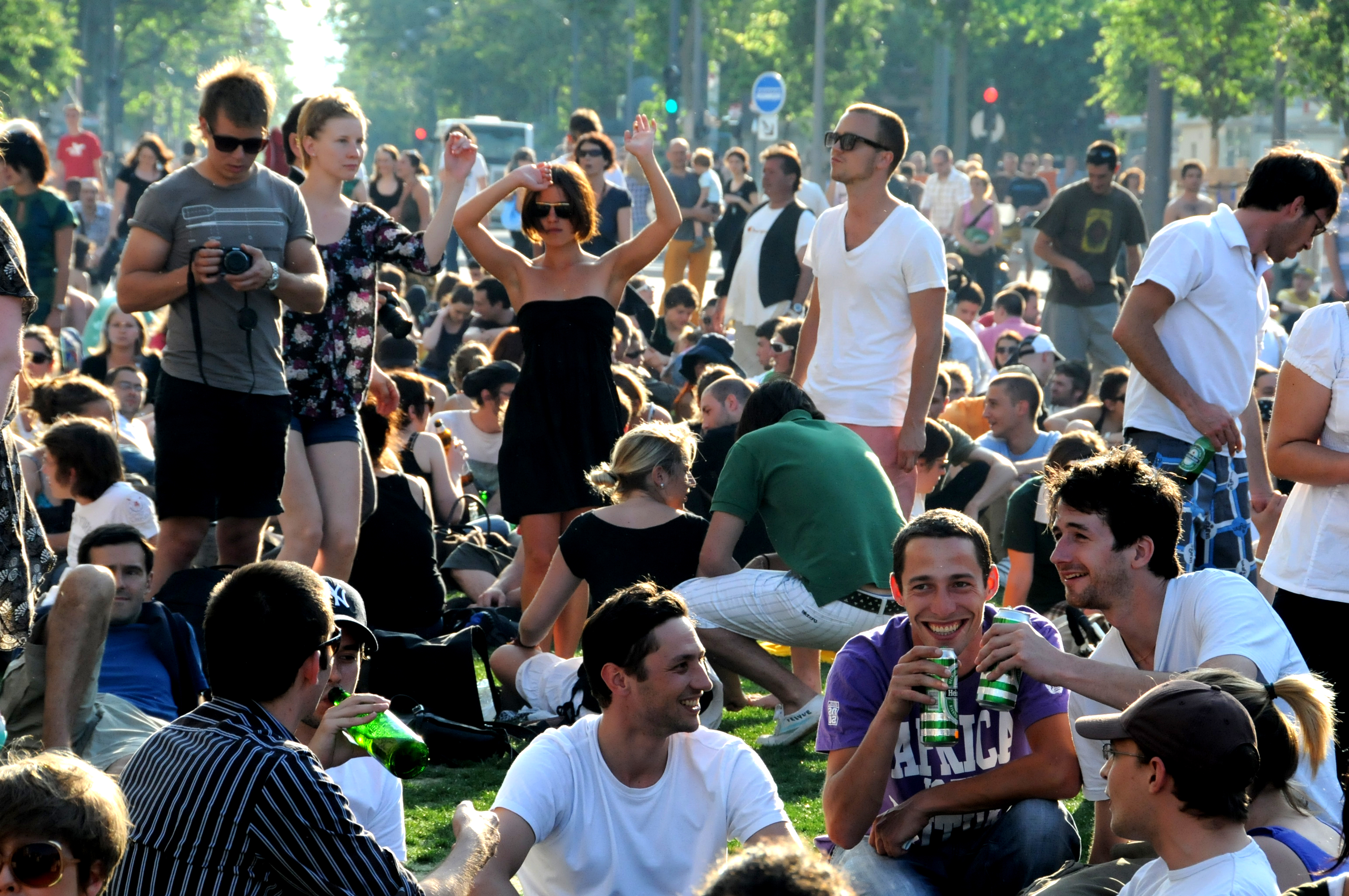

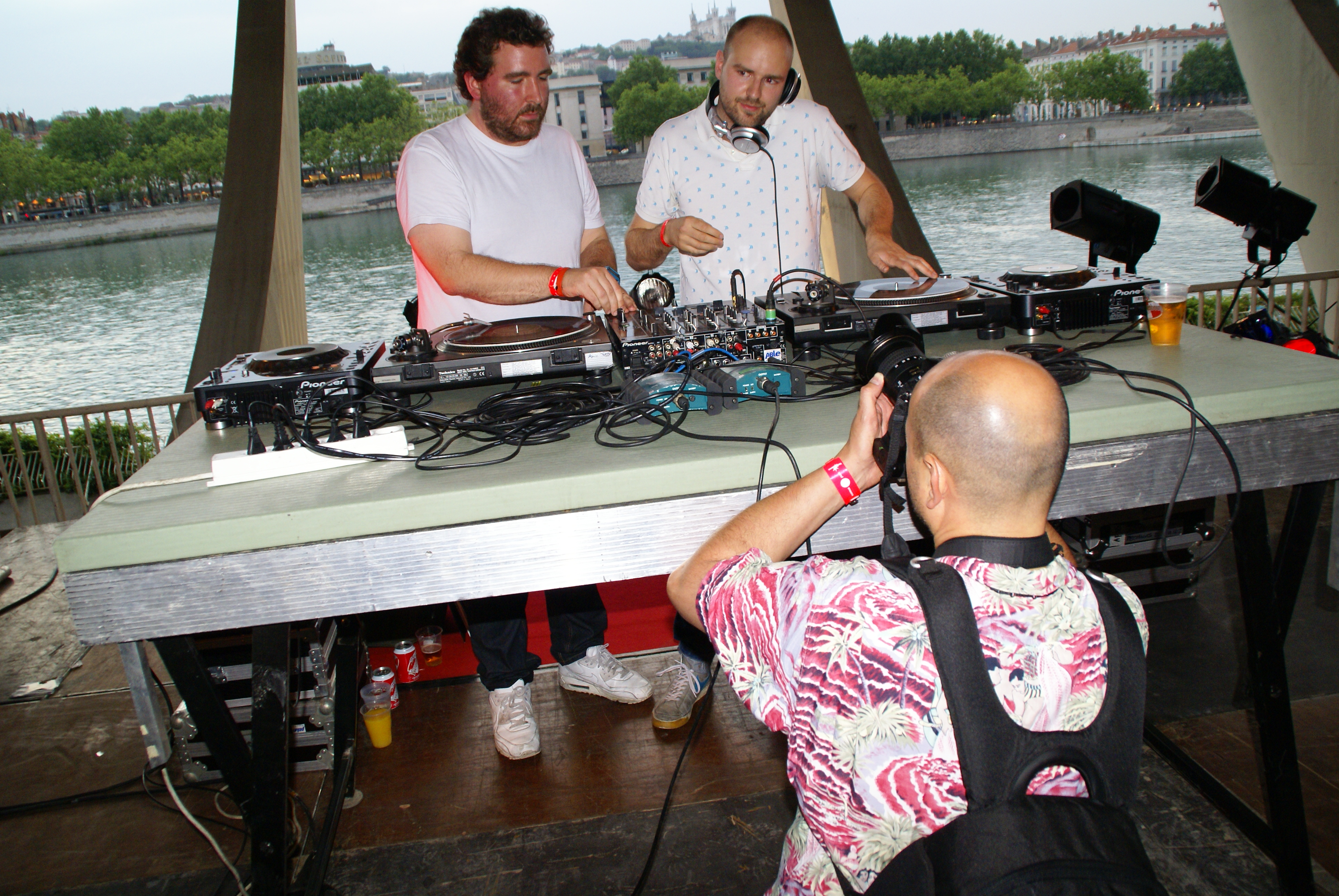

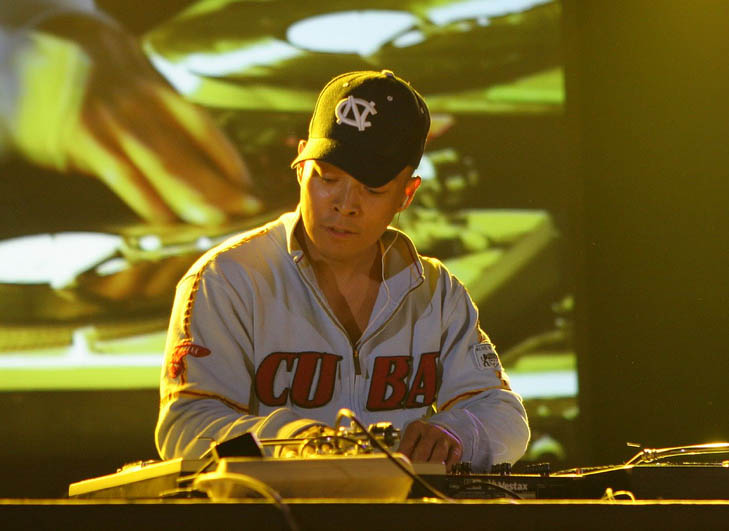

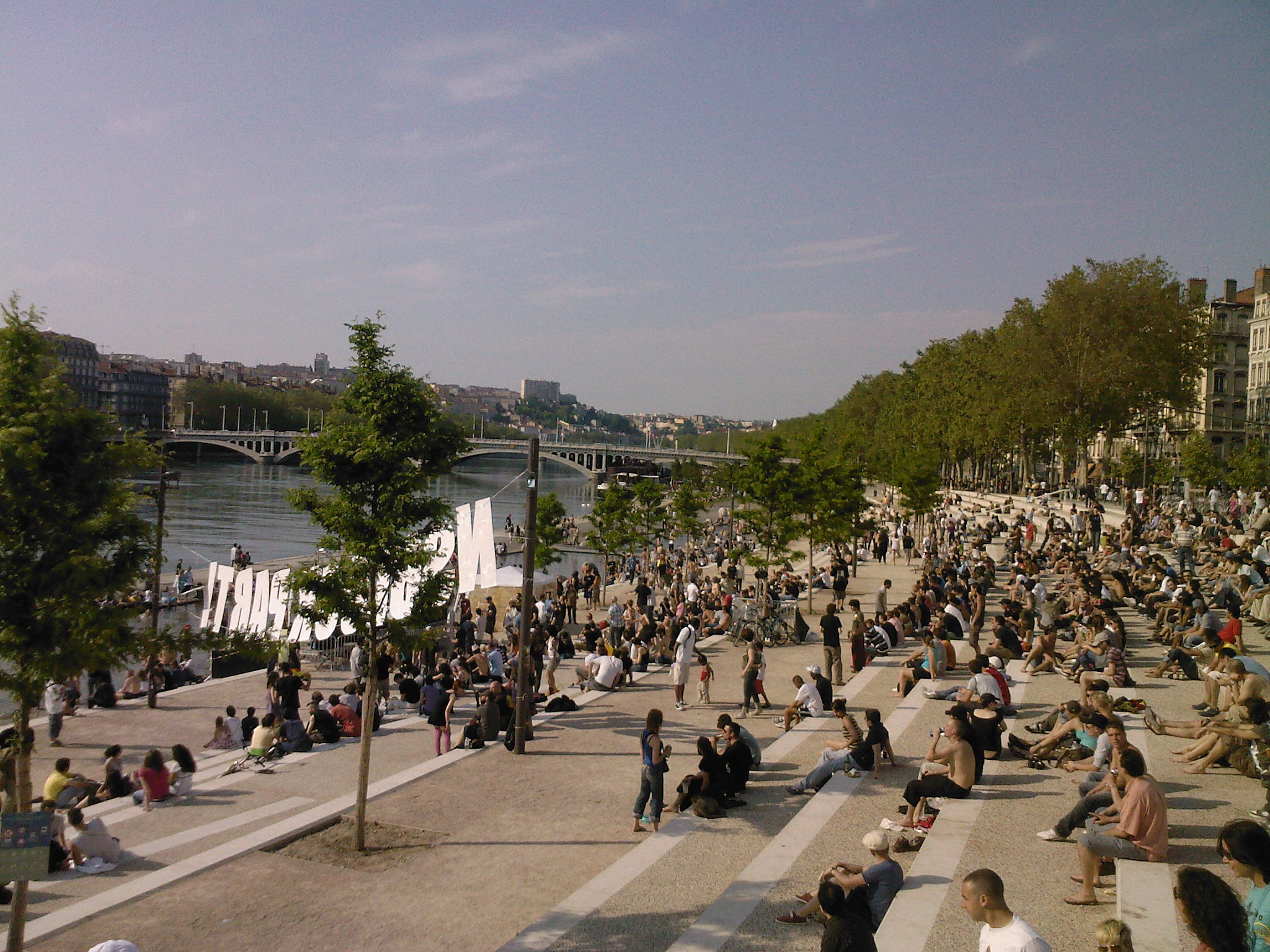

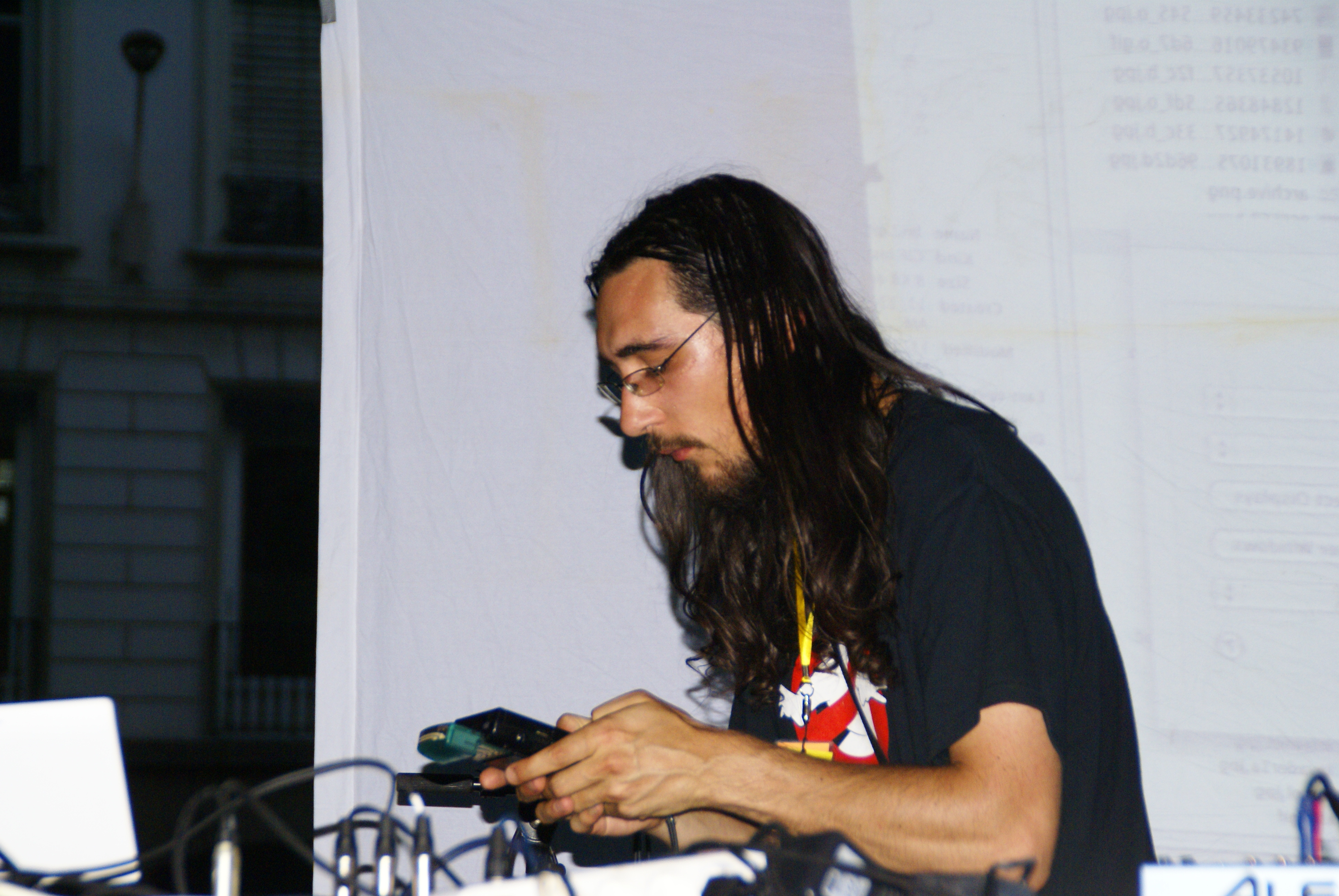

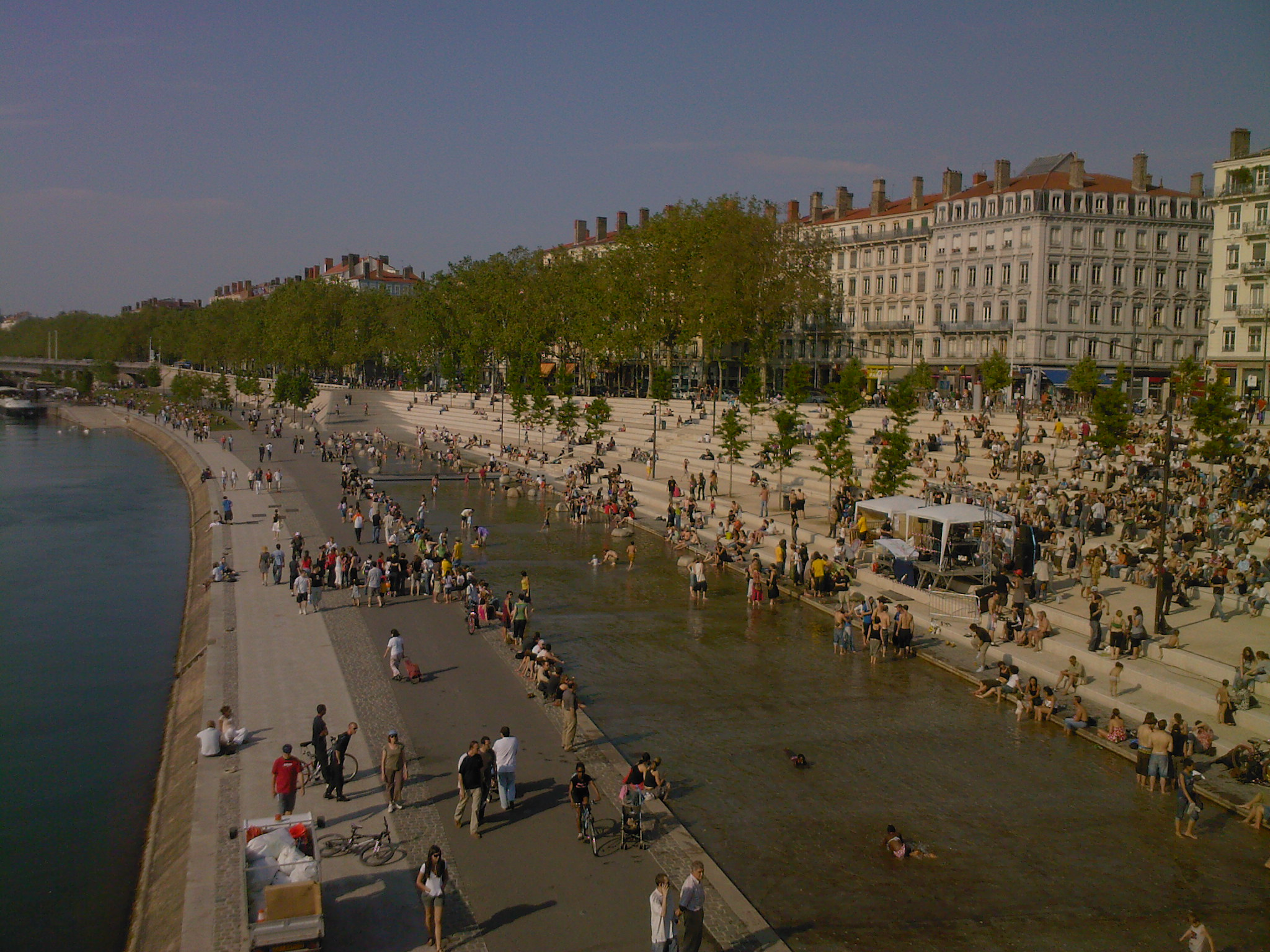

== See also ==
- List of electronic music festivals
- Live electronic music
- Nuits de Fourvière
