= Vanessa Wagner =

French classical pianist

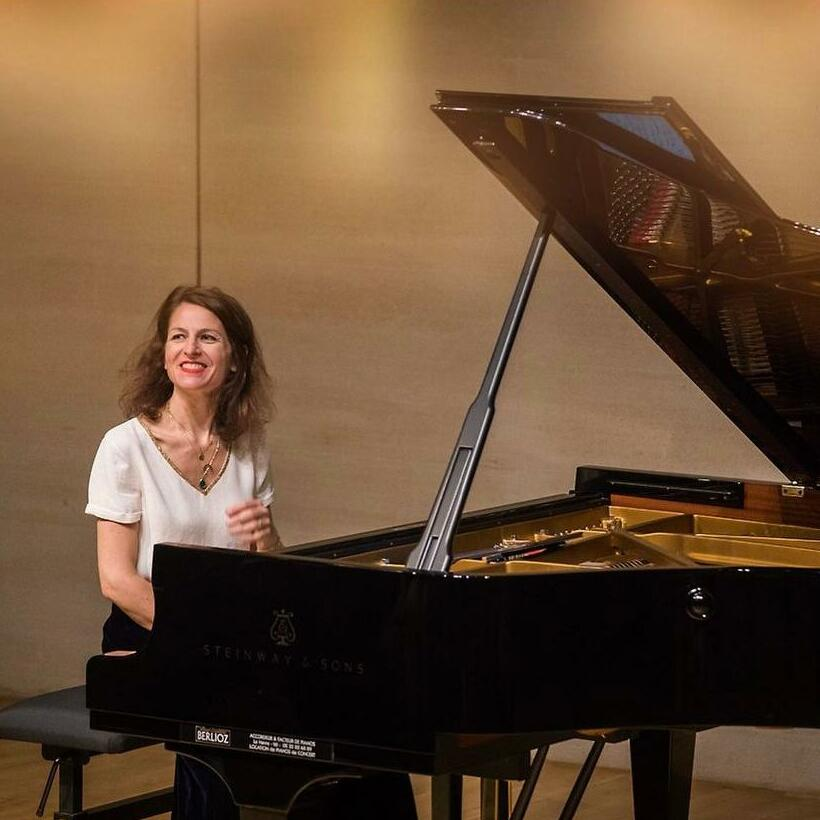
- Vanessa Wagner in 2016
- Born: June 11, 1973 (age 52)
- Known for: Pianist

Vanessa Wagner (born 11 June 1973, in Rennes) is a French classical pianist.

== Biography ==
She studied in the class of Dominique Merlet at the Conservatoire de Paris. At 17, she won the first prize, and went on to study with Jean-François Heisser. On the recommendation of the pianist Leon Fleisher, she took up a place at the academy at Cadenabbia, in Italy, where her teachers included Fleisher himself, Fou Ts'ong, Karl Ulrich Schnabel, Murray Perahia and Alexis Weissenberg. She was awarded the Victoire de la Musique (the French equivalent of the Grammy award) as the most promising instrumental soloist in 1999.

In 2014, she began a dialogue with the composer of Mexican electronic music Murcof, especially during the first edition of "Beyond My Piano", a musical rendez-vous at the Bouffes du Nord in Paris. In 2016, she accompanied him on the album Statea , published on the label InFine.

== Selected discography ==
On Lyrinx Records

- Rachmaninoff: Piano Sonata No. 2 (1996)
- Scriabin: Fantaisie in B minor, Op. 28 (1998)
- Mozart: Piano sonatas K280, K282, K310 & K330
- Schumann: Piano sonatas Nos. 1 & 2, Nachtstücke, Op. 23

On Naïve Records

- Brahms Four Ballades, Op. 10 & Schumann: Sonata in F sharp.

On Ambroisie Records

- Debussy: Images, Images Oubliées, Estampes, Valse romantique
- Variations – Haydn : Variations in F minor Hob.XVII:6, Berio: Cinque variazioni per pianoforte, Jean-Philippe Rameau: Gavotte variée Brahms: Variations on a Theme of Schumann, Op. 9 and Rachmaninoff: Variations on a Theme of Corelli, Op. 42
- Britten: Sonata for cello and piano (with the cellist Ophélie Gaillard)

On Aparté Records

- Schubert: Piano Sonatas D.664 & D.784, Impromptus D.899
- Ravel: Ma mère l'Oye, Valses nobles et sentimentales, Gaspard de la nuit, Pavane pour une infante défunte

Other

- Aphex Twin: Avril 14th
