= Breton (band) =

English rock band

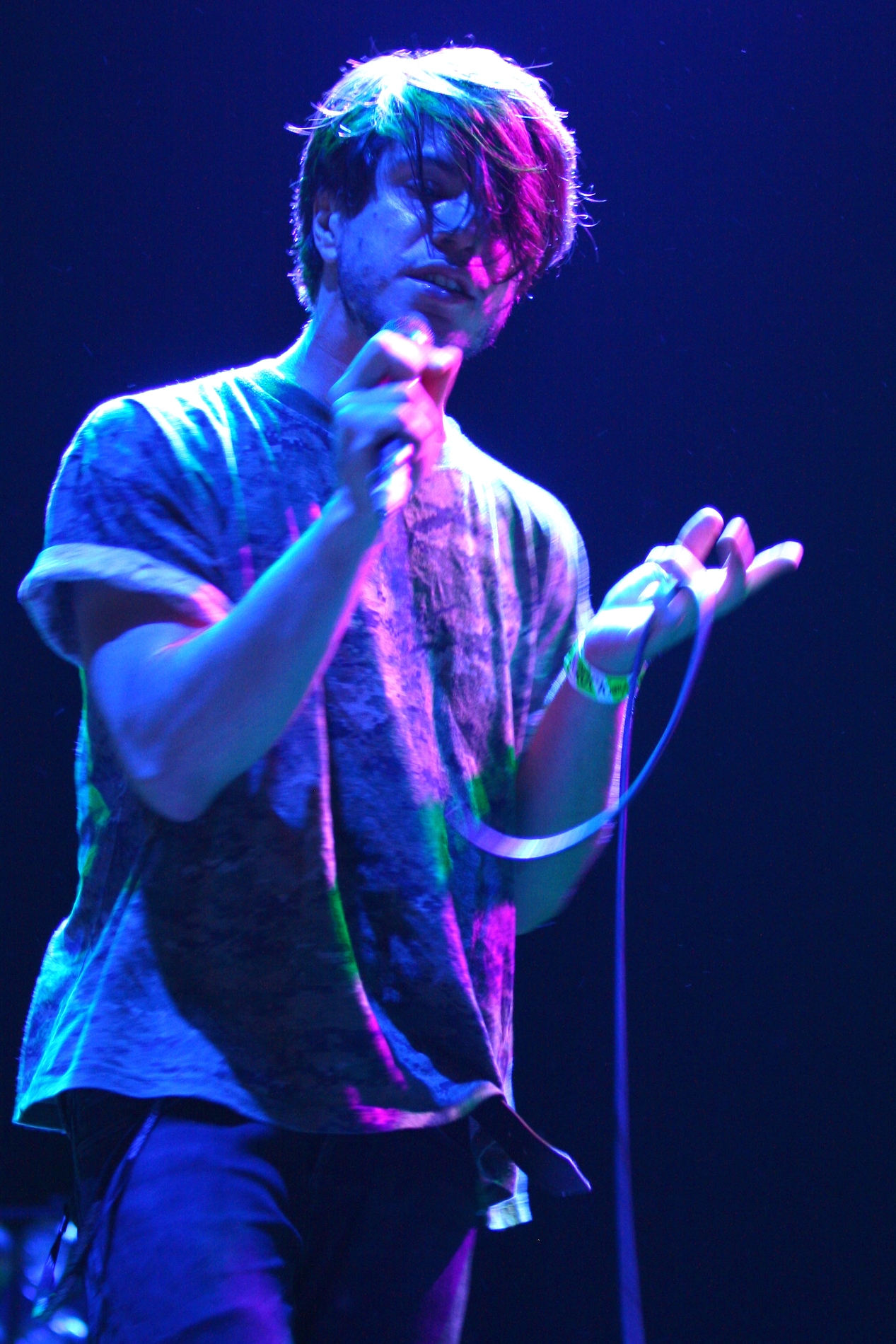
- Roman Rappak during Rock im Park in 2014

Background information
- Origin: London, England, UK
- Genres: Indie rock; experimental rock; electronic
- Years active: 2007–2019
- Labels: Fatcat; Believe; Cut Tooth; Strange Torpedo; Hemlock
- Past members: Adam Ainger; Roman Rappak; Daniel McIlvenny; Ian Patterson; Ryan McClarnon; Alex Wadey

Breton was an English band from London, consisting of lead vocalist and guitarist Roman Rappak, drummer Adam Ainger, programmer Ian Patterson, bassist Daniel McIlvenny, and visual artist Ryan McClarnon.

Rappak and Ainger began playing together around 2007, but the full group did not coalesce until several years later. They envisioned themselves as a multimedia artist collective, working from a former NatWest bank building in Elephant and Castle which they dubbed Breton Labs. The group released three extended plays and did remixes for artists such as Tricky, Alt-J, The Temper Trap, Lana Del Rey and Local Natives. The group signed to Fatcat Records in 2011 and released their debut full-length, Other People's Problems, early the following year.

For much of 2012 and 2013, the band played around Europe while writing material in preparation for a follow-up album. As their own studios had been earmarked for demolition, the five-piece moved to Berlin to record the new album. They set up their own label and signed with Believe Recordings (UK) and released the singles "Envy" and "Got Well Soon" by the end of 2013. In early February 2014, the album War Room Stories was released.

Breton's single "Edward the Confessor" was included in the 2012 action-adventure game Sleeping Dogs as one of the songs in the in-game "Kerrang! Radio". The following year, their single "The Commission" was included in the racing video game Asphalt 8: Airborne as one of the main menu themes. In 2015, the band's single "Got Well Soon" was included in episode 4 of the episodic video game Life Is Strange as the first song played inside the Vortex Club, causing a rise in popularity of the single.

In February 2019, Rappak confirmed the splitting of the band through posts on Facebook, Twitter, and Instagram.

== Band members ==
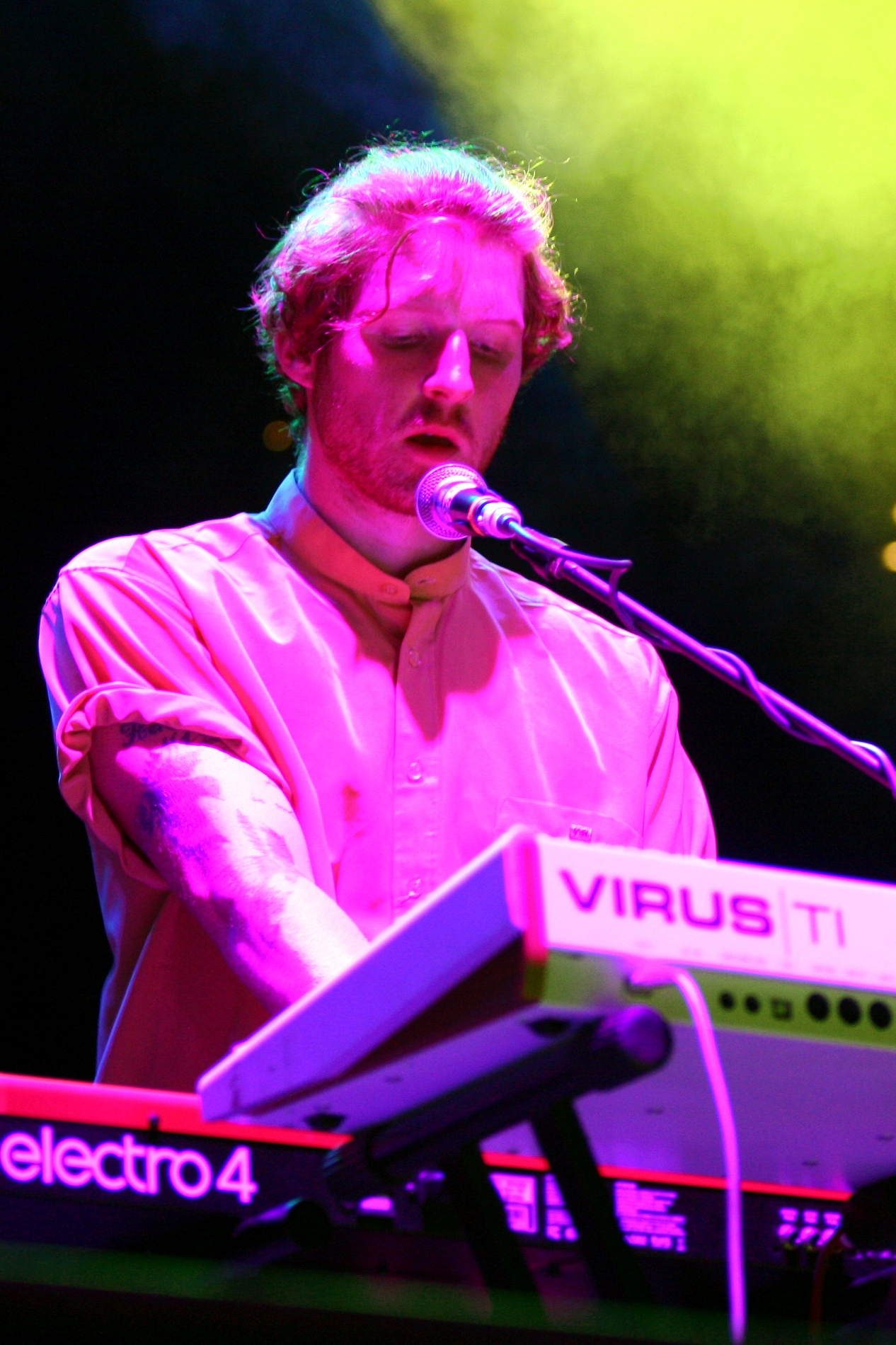
Daniel McIlvenny

Final line-up

- Adam Ainger - drums (2007–2019)
- Roman Rappak - lead vocals, guitar (2007–2019)
- Daniel McIlvenny - bass guitar, keyboards, synthesizers (2010–2019)
- Ian Patterson - beats (2010–2019)
- Ryan McClarnon - visuals (2012–2019)

Former

- Alex Wadey (2010–2011)

== Discography ==
=== Albums ===
Album and details	Peak positions	
Album and details	FR	UK Indie
Other People's Problems: Year released: 2012; Record label: Fat Cat Records	151	35
War Room Stories: Year released: 2014; Record label: Cut Tooth / Believe Recordings	33	49

=== EPs ===
- Practical EP (Strange Torpedo, 2010)
- Sharing Notes EP (BretonLabs, 2010)
- Counter Balance EP (Hemlock Recordings, 2011)
- Blanket Rule EP (2012)
- Escalation EP (BretonLabs, 2013)
- Force of Habit EP (Cut Tooth / Believe Recordings, 2013)

=== Singles ===
Charting

Year	Song	Peak positions	Album
Year	Song	FR	Album
2012	"The Commission"	141	Other People's Problems
2014	"Envy"	84	War Room Stories

Other singles

- "Edward the Confessor" (Fat Cat Records, 2011)
- "Interference" (Fat Cat Records, 2012)
- "Jostle" (Fat Cat Records, 2012)
- "Population Density" (Fat Cat Records, 2012)
- "Remixed 12"" (Fat Cat Records, 2013)
- "Got Well Soon" (Cut Tooth / Believe Recordings, 2013)
- "Envy" (Cut Tooth / Believe Recordings, 2013)
