= Fat Freddy's Drop discography =

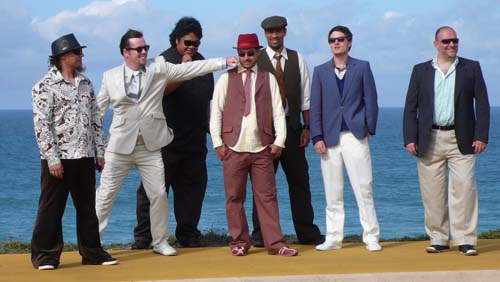
- Studio albums: 8
- Extended plays: 3
- Live albums: 2
- Singles: 12
- Video albums: 1
- Music videos: 4

Fat Freddy's Drop have released eight studio albums, two live albums, and several singles. Their songs have appeared on compilation albums both in New Zealand and internationally. In 2007, they released a DVD, Fantastic Voyages Vol. 1, with live footage from their 2006 World Cup Tour, music videos, and behind the scenes footage.

== Albums ==
=== Studio albums ===
List of studio albums, with selected chart positions and certifications
Title	Album details	Peak chart positions										Certifications
Title	Album details	NZ	AUS	AUT	BEL (FL)	DEN	FRA	GER	NLD	SWI	UK	Certifications
Based on a True Story	Released: 2 May 2005; Label: The Drop · Kartel · Sonar Kollektiv; Format: CD · digital download · LP	1	—	—	—	—	—	—	—	—	—	RMNZ: 11× Platinum
Dr Boondigga and the Big BW	Released: 2 June 2009; Label: The Drop; Format: CD · digital download · LP	1	45	—	—	—	97	97	—	—	—	RMNZ: 2× Platinum
Blackbird	Released: 9 July 2013; Label: The Drop; Format: CD · digital download · LP	1	11	—	72	26	188	65	65	55	59	RMNZ: 3× Platinum
Bays	Released: 23 October 2015; Label: The Drop; Format: CD · digital download · LP	1	12	66	93	—	141	35	77	93	79	RMNZ: Gold
Special Edition Part 1	Released: 15 November 2019; Label: The Drop; Format: CD · digital download · LP	4	— (Note: Special Edition Part 1 did not enter the ARIA Albums Chart, but peaked at number 19 on the ARIA Digital Album Chart.)	—	—	—	—	—	—	—	—	
Lock-In	Released: 16 October 2020; Label: The Drop; Format: CD · digital download · LP	17	—	—	—	—	—	—	—	—	—	
Wairunga	Released: 20 August 2021; Label: The Drop; Format: CD · digital download · LP	12	—	—	—	—	—	—	—	—	—	
Slo Mo	Released: 25 October 2024; Label: The Drop; Format: CD · digital download · LP	3	—	—	—	—	—	—	—	—	—	
"—" denotes items which were not released in that country or failed to chart.

=== Live albums ===
List of albums, with selected chart positions and certifications
Title	Album details	Peak chart positions	Certifications
Title	Album details	NZ	Certifications
Live at the Matterhorn	Released: May 2001; Label: The Drop; Format: CD · digital download	—	RMNZ: Gold
Live at Roundhouse London	Released: 14 June 2010; Label: The Drop; Format: CD · digital download	8	
"—" denotes items which failed to chart.

=== Remix albums ===
List of remix albums, with selected chart positions
Title	Album details	Peak chart positions
Title	Album details	NZ
Blackbird Returns	Released: 29 September 2023; Label: The Drop; Format: CD · digital download	17

== Extended plays ==
List of EPs, with selected details and chart positions
Title	EP details	Peak chart positions
Title	EP details	NZ
Hope for a Generation EP	Released: 2004; Label: The Drop; Format: CD · digital download · 12" vinyl	—
Remix EP	Released: 2004; Label: The Drop; Format: CD · digital download · 12" vinyl	—
Wandering Eye EP	Released: 2006; Label: The Drop; Format: digital download	—
Fat Electric Drop EP (DJ Vadim vs. Fat Freddy's Drop)	Released: 25 September 2012; Label: The Drop; Format: 12" vinyl · digital download	—
Live in Munich	Released: 13 October 2014; Label: The Drop; Format: digital download	—
iTunes Session	Released: 12 December 2014; Label: The Drop; Format: digital download	19
"—" denotes items which were not released in that country or failed to chart.

== Singles ==
List of singles as lead artist, with selected chart positions, showing year released and album name
Title	Year	Peak chart positions	Certifications	Album
Title	Year	NZ	Certifications	Album
"Hope"	2003	—		Based on a True Story
"This Room" (as Joe Dukie and DJ Fitchie feat. Fat Freddy's Drop)	2003	—		Based on a True Story
"Flashback"	2005	—		Based on a True Story
"Roady"	2005	—		Based on a True Story
"Wandering Eye"	2005	6	RMNZ: 9× Platinum	Based on a True Story
"Cay’s Crays"	2006	—		Based on a True Story
"The Camel" (featuring Alice Russell)	2008	14		Dr Boondigga and the Big BW
"Pull the Catch"	2008	17		Dr Boondigga and the Big BW
"The Raft"	2010	—		Dr Boondigga and the Big BW
"Silver and Gold"	2012	— (Note: "Silver and Gold" did not enter the NZ Top 40 Singles Chart, but peaked at number 10 on the NZ Artists Singles Chart.)		Blackbird
"Clean the House"	2013	30		Blackbird
"Mother Mother"	2013	— (Note: "Mother Mother" did not enter the NZ Top 40 Singles Chart, but peaked at number 14 on the NZ Artists Singles Chart.)		Blackbird
"Slings & Arrows"	2014	5		Bays
"Little One"	2015	—		Non-album singles
"Seconds" (featuring Joe Dukie & DJ Fitchie)	2015	—		Non-album singles
"Grounded" (featuring Joe Dukie & DJ Fitchie)	2015	—		Non-album singles
"Razor"	2015	— (Note: "Razor" did not enter the NZ Top 40 Singles Chart, but peaked at number 9 on the NZ Artists Singles Chart.)		Bays
"Trickle Down"	2018	— (Note: "Trickle Down" did not enter the NZ Top 40 Singles Chart, but peaked at number 8 on the NZ Artists Singles Chart.)		Special Edition Part 1
"Kamo Kamo"	2019	— (Note: "Kamo Kamo" did not enter the NZ Top 40 Singles Chart, but peaked at number 14 on the NZ Hot Singles Chart.)		Special Edition Part 1
"Shady"	2021	— (Note: "Shady" did not enter the NZ Top 40 Singles Chart, but peaked at number 24 on the NZ Hot Singles Chart.)		Wairunga
"Bones"	2021	— (Note: "Bones" did not enter the NZ Top 40 Singles Chart, but peaked at number 30 on the NZ Hot Singles Chart.)		Wairunga
"Blackbird" (Kings remix)	2023	— (Note: "Blackbird" (Kings remix) did not enter the NZ Top 40 Singles Chart, but peaked at number 17 on the NZ Hot Singles Chart.)		Blackbird Returns
"Next Stop" (featuring MC Slave)	2024	— (Note: "Next Stop" did not enter the NZ Top 40 Singles Chart, but peaked at number 22 on the NZ Hot Singles Chart.)		Slo Mo
"Slo Mo"	2024	— (Note: "Slo Mo" did not enter the NZ Top 40 Singles Chart, but peaked at number 20 on the NZ Hot Singles Chart.)		Slo Mo
"—" denotes items which failed to chart.

== Other charted songs ==
Title	Year	Peak chart positions		Album
Title	Year	NZ Artist	NZ Hot	Album
"10 Feet Tall"	2015	11	—	Bays
"Wairunga Blues"	2015	14	—	Bays
"Makkan"	2015	16	—	Bays
"Special Edition"	2019	—	8	Special Edition Part 1
"OneFourteen"	2019	—	13	Special Edition Part 1
"Raleigh Twenty"	2019	—	20	Special Edition Part 1
"Coffee Black"	2021	—	22	Wairunga
"Bush Telegraph"	2021	—	33	Wairunga
"Dig Deep"	2021	—	24	Wairunga
"Avengers"	2024	—	31	Slo Mo
"Stand Straight"	2024	—	13	Slo Mo
"Oldemos"	2024	—	37	Slo Mo

== DVDs ==
Year	DVD
2007	Fantastic Voyages Vol. 1: Released: June 25, 2010; Label: The Drop; Recording of the '2006 World Cup Tour' in Europe, as well as three music videos

== Music videos ==
Year	Title	Director(s)
2002	"Hope"	Marcel Allan
2002	"Seconds"	Sarah Hunter and Jacob Luamanuvae
2005	"Wandering Eye"	Mark Williams
2007	"Ray Ray"	Armahgn Ballentyne and John Baxter
2008	"The Camel"	
2009	"Pull the Catch"	
2015	"Ten Feet Tall	
2016	"Fish in the Sea"	

== Featured appearances ==
- (1999) - 21st Celebration (NZ) (Radio Active) - Hope
- (2000) - One Love (NZ) (Radio Active) - Wairunga Blues
- (2001) - Loop 002 (NZ) (Loop Recordings) - Little One (Live At McDonalds)
- (2001) - Styles Upon Styles Part 1 (NZ) (Sugarlicks) - Runnin' (Studio Version)
- (2002) - Loop 003 (NZ) (Loop Recordings) - Runnin
- (2002) - Loop 004 (NZ) (Loop Recordings) - Bluey
- (2002) - The Green Room 001 (NZ) (Loop Recordings) - Runnin
- (2003) - Weekend Sessions (NZ/AUS) (Liberation Music) - Seconds
- (2003) - Whopper Chopper Seaside Extravaganza (NZ) (Whopper Chopper Trust) - Willow Tree (Live in Berlin at Cafe Moskau)
- (2004) - The Eclectic Sessions Vol. 2 (UK) (Trust The DJ Records) - Hope
- (2004) - Best Seven Selections (Best Seven/Sonar Kollektive) - Hope & This Room
- (2004) - Conscious Roots (NZ) (Capitol Music/Moving Production) - Hope
- (2005) - Conscious Roots 2 (NZ) (Capitol Music) - Ernie
- (2005) - Dub Conspiracy (NZ) (record label unknown) - Mightnight Marauders (Live on Gilles Peterson)
- (2005) - The Green Room 004 (NZ) (Loop Recordings) - Hope
- (2007) - Nu Reggae (FR) (Wagram Music) - Wandering Eye
- (2010) - Nova Tunes 2.1 (FR) - The Raft
