= Recloose =

- Born: Matthew Chicoine
- Origin: Detroit, Michigan
- Genres: Electronica; trip hop; broken beat
- Occupations: Record producer; DJ
- Years active: 1997–present
- Labels: Peacefrog; Planet E
- Website: www.recloose.com

Matthew Chicoine, better known by his stage name Recloose, is an American electronic music producer, DJ, and musician hailing from Detroit, Michigan, US. He is known for numerous releases on independent dance labels like Planet E, Rush Hour, Peacefrog, Studio !K7, Sonar Kollektiv and Delusions of Grandeur. Chicoine is also a touring DJ who has played in and around Europe, the UK, the United States, Japan, China, Singapore, Indonesia, Brazil, Australia and New Zealand.

== Life and career ==
Chicoine's professional career began in 1997 when he met techno artist Carl Craig via a demo tape slipped into a sandwich while working at Detroit's Russell Street Deli. He released his debut EP So This Is the Dining Room in 1998 and a follow-up EP Spelunking in 1999 on Planet E recordings, which were both re-issued via Rush Hour Recordings in 2010. His debut album Cardiology on Planet E/Studio !k7 came out in 2002, a critically acclaimed release that featured Detroit area artists Dwele, Genevieve Marentette, Colin Stetson, Rayse Biggs of Was (Not Was), Jeremy Ellis, Paul Randolph, Jerry the Cat, Amp Fiddler, John Arnold, and Malik Alston.

In late 2001, Chicoine re-located to New Zealand where he began working with local musicians Dallas Tamaira of Fat Freddy's Drop, Hollie Smith, Jonathan Crayford, and members of Trinity Roots, also forming the touring group "The Recloose Live Band," a group that performed at the North Sea Jazz Festival, and London's renowned clubs Fabric and The Jazz Cafe. He was awarded the Best Dance/Electronica Album Tui for his album Perfect Timing at the New Zealand Music Awards in late 2008. He completed a master's degree at the University of Auckland in 2014.

In 2008, Chicoine founded the Hit It & Quit It radio show on Auckland, New Zealand's George FM, co-hosted with local producer and DJ Frank Booker, releasing a radio-themed compilation CD "Hit It & Quit It Radio Revue Vol. I" with accompanying Serato vinyl pressing in 2011. In 2009, he undertook full-time work as programme leader and tutor at Auckland's Music and Audio Institute of New Zealand, helping to create and implement the DJ and Electronic Music Production program.

== Discography ==
=== Studio albums ===
- Cardiology (2002)
- Hiatus on the Horizon (2004)
- Perfect Timing (2008)

=== Compilation albums ===
- Early Works (2010)

=== Live albums ===
- Backwards and Sideways (2007)

=== EPs ===
- So This Is the Dining Room (1998)
- Spelunking (1999)
- Deeper Waters (2008)
- Saturday Night Manifesto E.P. (2011)
- Magic (2012)
- Don't Get Me Wrong EP (2012)
- It's Too Late EP (2013)

=== Singles ===
- "Can't Take It" (2000)
- "Ain't Changin'" (2002)
- "Us vs. Us" (2003)
- "Dust" (2005)
- "Mana's Bounce" b/w "Time Is on Your Side" (2005)
- "Maui's Lament" (2008)
