= Fantastic Voyages Vol. 1 =

Fantastic Voyages Vol.1

Video (DVD) by Fat Freddys Drop
- Released: 25 June 2007
- Recorded: During the '2006 World Cup Tour' in Europe
- Genre: Dub/Reggae
- Length: 107 minutes
- Label: The Drop

Professional ratings
Review scores
Source	Rating
flyglobalmusic	(not rated) link

Fantastic Voyages Vol. 1 is a DVD released by the New Zealand band Fat Freddy's Drop. It includes live footage shot on their '2006 World Cup Tour' around Europe, as well as extra music videos and bonus material.

== DVD track listing ==
=== True Stories ===
Fat Freddy's Drop live footage shot on the European '2006 World Cup Tour'. These versions of old and new tracks as live clips are one-offs, inspired jams. Jump on the tour bus, be a fly on the lid of the tequila bottle backstage and check what the Freddys get up to when they leave NZ without the Whānau. This is Rock & Roll after all...

- Ireland - The Garden Party
- Edinburgh - Liquid Rooms
- Manchester - Academy 2
- London - Brixton Academy
- Berlin - Club Maria
- Paris - Cabaret Sauvage
- Barcelona - Sónar
- Portugal - Algarve Summer Festival

=== Music Videos ===
- Wandering Eye
- Roady
- Ray Ray

=== Kiss Da Cook ===
- Episode 1 - Cockles Galicia - Shuk

=== Hidden Gems ===
- Midnight Marauders - Algarve Summer Festival - Docket Bay - Dom Pedro Golf - Portugal
