= Cardiology (disambiguation) =

Cardiology is the study of the heart.

Cardiology may also refer to:

- Cardiology (journal)
- Cardiology (album), a 2010 album by Good Charlotte
- Cardiology (Recloose album), 2002
