= Wandering eye =

Wandering eye may refer to:

- strabismus, misalignment of the eyes
- looking at other people (see staring)
- "Wandering Eye", 2005 single by Fat Freddy's Drop
