= Cardiology (Recloose album) =

Studio album by Recloose
- Released: May 14, 2002
- Genre: Electronic
- Length: 72:18
- Labels: Planet E; Studio !K7
- Producer: Matthew Chicoine

Recloose chronology
Cardiology (2002)	Hiatus on the Horizon (2004)

Singles from Cardiology
- 1. "Can't Take It" Released: 2000; 2. "Ain't Changin'" Released: 2002

Cardiology is the debut studio album by American record producer Matthew Chicoine under the pseudonym Recloose. It was released on May 14, 2002, through Planet E Communications.

== Background ==
Matthew Chicoine, better known under the pseudonym Recloose, is an American record producer originally from Detroit, Michigan. Cardiology is his debut studio album. It features performances by Justin Chapman, Genevieve, Jerry the Cat, Dwele, Jeremy Ellis, Paul Randolph, Colin Stetson, John Arnold, Malik Alston, and Rayce Biggs. It consists of 11 tracks.

The album was released on May 14, 2002, through Planet E Communications. In Europe, it was released through Studio !K7.

== Critical reception ==
Professional ratings
Review scores
Source	Rating
AllMusic	4/5 stars
Entertainment Weekly	A–
NME	7/10
Tiny Mix Tapes	4.5/5 stars

Tony Naylor of NME described the album as "a warm, bubbling brook of soulful jazz-techno, a restless rolling evolution which thoughtfully merges house, funk, even reggae and hip-hop influences into one fluid whole." John Bush of AllMusic called it "a collection of great tracks." Piotr Orlov of Cleveland Scene stated, "Like many classic Detroit records, and unlike most techno, Cardiology is soft, melodically eloquent, and funky as hell." Andy Battaglia of The A.V. Club wrote, "With a fetish for both naturalistic drum sounds and future-funk exploration, Recloose grows one of the year's best electronic-music albums from a fertile mix of soil and space dust."

=== Accolades ===
Accolades for Cardiology
Publication	List	Rank	Ref.
Resident Advisor	Top 100 Albums of the '00s	52	
The Wire	50 Records of the Year (2002 Rewind)	22	

== Track listing ==
All tracks are written by Matthew Chicoine, except where noted.

Cardiology track listing
No.	Title	Writer(s)	Length
1.	"Ain't Changin'"	Chicoine; Jutin Chapman	6:22
2.	"Ghost Stories"		6:31
3.	"Can't Take It"	Chicoine; Dwele	6:25
4.	"Kapiti Dream"		8:11
5.	"Up and Up"		8:20
6.	"Procession"		5:55
7.	"Get There Tonight"		5:58
8.	"Permutations"		6:33
9.	"M.I.A."	Chicoine; John Arnold; Genevieve	4:48
10.	"Absence of One"		6:06
11.	"Cardiology"	Chicoine; Mailk Alston	7:09
Total length:			72:18

== Personnel ==
Credits adapted from liner notes.

- Matthew Chicoine – production, engineering, mixing
- Carl Craig – executive production, engineering, mixing
- Michael Fossenkemper – mastering
- Justin Chapman – vocals (1)
- Genevieve – additional vocals (1), vocals (9)
- Jerry the Cat – percussion (1, 11)
- Dwele – vocals (3)
- Jeremy Ellis – additional keyboards (4)
- Paul Randolph – bass guitar (5)
- Colin Stetson – saxophone (8)
- John Arnold – guitar (9)
- Malik Alston – vocals (11)
- Rayce Biggs – trumpet (11)
- Kenjji – illustration
- Easyco – design
