= Programmed (Innerzone Orchestra album) =

Studio album by Innerzone Orchestra
- Released: August 24, 1999
- Genre: Detroit techno, jazz
- Length: 74:30
- Label: Planet E Communications
- Producer: Carl Craig

Carl Craig chronology
More Songs about Food & Revolutionary Art (1997)	Programmed (1999)	The Album Formerly Known As... (2005)

Professional ratings
Review scores
Source	Rating
AllMusic	4.5/5 stars
The A.V. Club	favorable
JazzTimes	favorable

Programmed is a 1999 studio album by Innerzone Orchestra, which consists of Carl Craig and assorted musicians. It peaked at number 38 on the UK R&B Albums Chart.

== Critical reception ==
John Bush of AllMusic gave the album 4.5 stars out of 5, describing it as "a work of electronic music in the abstract that rejects the accepted standards of any style of music, whether it's techno, electronica, jazzy house, or recent fusion." Joshua Klein of The A.V. Club said, "Craig's genius is illustrated in how he devises ways to incorporate live instruments into the mix so they sound like they're communicating with the machine-generated programming."

== Track listing ==
No.	Title	Writer(s)	Length
1.	"Wrong Number"		1:12
2.	"Manufactured Memories"	Carl Craig	4:57
3.	"The Beginning of the End"	Craig, Terrell McMathis	3:58
4.	"Programmed"	Craig	2:59
5.	"Eruption"	Craig, Craig Taborn, Francisco Mora	5:45
6.	"Monsters"	Craig	3:04
7.	"Blakula"	Craig	9:04
8.	"People Make the World Go 'Round"	Thom Bell, Linda Creed	5:13
9.	"Architecture"	Craig, Richie Hawtin	5:07
10.	"Basic Math"	Craig, Taborn, Mora	8:48
11.	"Timing"	Craig, Taborn	4:54
12.	"Galaxy"	Papa Dee Allen, Harold Ray Brown, B. B. Dickerson, Lonnie Jordan, Charles Miller, Lee Oskar, Howard E. Scott, Jerry Goldstein	5:08
13.	"At Les"	Craig	7:43
14.	"Bug in the Bass Bin"	Craig	5:32

== Charts ==
Chart	Peak position
UK R&B Albums (OCC)	38

== Release history ==
Region	Date	Label	Format	Catalog
United States	1999	Planet E Communications, Community Projects	LP	PE 65247, CMP002
United States	1999	Astralwerks	CD	ASW 6277-2
United Kingdom	1999	Talkin' Loud	LP	546 137-1
United Kingdom	1999	Talkin' Loud	5x10"	870 947-0
United Kingdom	1999	Mercury Records	CD	IZ0P1
Europe	1999	Talkin' Loud	CD	546 137-2
Europe	2007	Talkin' Loud	double LP	PG-1
Japan	1999	Mercury Records	CD	PHCW-1036
