= Elements 1989–1990 =

Compilation album by Psyche\BFC
- Released: 1996
- Genre: Detroit techno, ambient techno
- Length: 66:57 (1996 CD)
- Label: Planet E Communications
- Producer: Carl Craig

Carl Craig chronology
The Secret Tapes of Doctor Eichrich (1996)	Elements 1989–1990 (1996)	More Songs about Food & Revolutionary Art (1997)

Elements 1989–1990 is a 1996 compilation of early recordings by Detroit techno musician Carl Craig, released under the pseudonyms Psyche and BFC. It was released on Craig's label Planet E Communications and reissued in 2013.

In 2011, Fact named it one of the 20 greatest ambient albums ever made.

== Recording ==
The recordings comprise some of Craig's earliest music, including his first recording "Neurotic Behavior." Beginning his career in his bedroom, Craig worked with a borrowed 4-track recorder. Some of the tracks were recorded in the homes of Derrick May, Renaat Vandepapeliere (of R&S Records), and singer Sarah Gregory. These recordings were released on labels such as Transmat, Fragile, and Craig's own Retroactive imprint. The track "Elements" was released on the various artists compilation Techno 2: The Next Generation (1990).

== Reception ==
Professional ratings
Review scores
Source	Rating
AllMusic	5/5 stars

The compilation showcases Craig's atmospheric, introspective approach to techno, a feel which Fact described as "tranquilised sci-fi." Critic Tony Marcus praised the compilation, labeling the recordings "narcoleptic, interior techno." AllMusic called the compilation "quintessential Detroit techno" which demonstrated "Craig's talents as producer even at this early point in his career." Critic John Bush called the recordings "seminal" and stated that they are "long pointed to as the birth of the second wave of Detroit techno."

== Tracklist ==
All tracks by Carl Craig (tracks 1–5, 11 credited to Psyche; tracks 6–10, 12, 13 credited to BFC).

1. "Elements" – 6:50
2. "Neurotic Behavior" – 7:42
3. "Crackdown" – 5:58
4. "From Beyond" – 5:43
5. "Andromeda" – 4:55
6. "Evolution" – 3:09
7. "Galaxy" – 6:41
8. "It's a Shame" – 5:39
9. "Please Stand By" – 5:02
10. "Chicken Noodle Soup" – 6:33
11. "How the West Was Won" – 3:34
12. "Sleep" – 5:11
13. "D.Funk" – 5:16 (bonus track, 2013 reissue)

== Personnel ==
Adapted from Discogs.

- Carl Craig – producer, composer, liner notes
- Anthony Shakir – edits (tracks 1 and 7)
- Sarah Gregory – vocals (track 3)
- Derrick May – mixing (track 5)
- Brendan M. Gillen – compilation, design
- Abdul Haqq – cover artwork
