= DJ-Kicks: Moodymann =

Compilation album by Moodymann
- Released: February 19, 2016
- Genre: Electronic
- Length: 79:34
- Label: Studio !K7

Moodymann chronology
Moodymann (2014)	DJ-Kicks: Moodymann (2016)	Sinner (2019)

DJ-Kicks chronology
DJ-Kicks: Seth Troxler (2015)	DJ-Kicks: Moodymann (2016)	DJ-Kicks: Dâm-Funk (2016)

DJ-Kicks: Moodymann is a DJ mix compilation album by Moodymann. It was released as part of the DJ-Kicks series by Studio !K7 on February 19, 2016. It peaked at number 8 on the Billboard Top Dance/Electronic Albums chart, as well as number 21 on the Heatseekers Albums chart.

== Critical reception ==
Professional ratings
Aggregate scores
Source	Rating
Metacritic	83/100
Review scores
Source	Rating
AllMusic	4/5 stars
Clash	8/10
Exclaim!	6/10
Pitchfork	8.4/10
PopMatters	8/10 stars
Resident Advisor	4.1/5
Spin	9/10
Tiny Mix Tapes	3.5/5 stars

At Metacritic, which assigns a weighted average score out of 100 to reviews from mainstream critics, the album received an average score of 83, based on 9 reviews, indicating "universal acclaim".

John Paul of PopMatters gave the album 8 out of 10 stars, writing, "with the presence of so many just-off-the-map yet accessible tracks, this set serves as an entry point to a host of artists all sharing a similar aesthetic operating at different levels drawn together by an overarching understanding of how music works on multiple levels." Ashley Hampson of Exclaim! gave the album a 6 out of 10, writing, "While the artistry is evident in his picks, Moodymann's execution here could've use a more deft hand."

Rolling Stone placed it at number 2 on the "20 Best EDM and Electronic Albums of 2016" list, while Spin placed it at number 49 on the "50 Best Albums of 2016" list. Philip Sherburne of Pitchfork included it on the "20 Best Electronic Albums of 2016" list.

== Track listing ==
No.	Title	Artist(s)	Length
1.	"Where Will You Be"	Yaw	4:13
2.	"Serve This Royalty"	Cody Chesnutt	5:42
3.	"Guttah Guttah"	Dopehead	2:36
4.	"Keepyourbusinesstoyourself"	Jitwam	3:12
5.	"Robot's Return (Modern Sleepover Part 2)"	Talc	5:35
6.	"When My Anger Starts to Cry"	Beady Belle	5:24
7.	"Kiss the Sky"	Shawn Lee featuring Nino Moschella	3:39
8.	"BTSTU (Moodymann Edit)"	Jai Paul	3:33
9.	"Tea Leaf Dancers"	Flying Lotus featuring Andreya Triana	3:12
10.	"Les Nuits"	Nightmares on Wax	3:42
11.	"Can't Hold Back (Platinum Pied Pipers Remix)"	Rich Medina featuring Sy Smith	3:59
12.	"Stained Glass Fresh Frozen"	Julien Dyne featuring Mara TK	3:58
13.	"Come Home"	Little Dragon	4:13
14.	"El Ritmo De Mi Gente"	Andrés featuring Lady	3:22
15.	"Uptown Tricks (Rodney Hunter Remix)"	Fort Knox Five featuring Mustafa Akbar	4:11
16.	"Cuz You're the One (Moodymann Edit)"	Daniel Bortz	6:25
17.	"Remain"	José González	3:46
18.	"My Funny Valentine"	Big Muff	4:00
19.	"Grind (Moodymann Edit)"	Les Sins	5:18
20.	"Disco Maniac"	Tirogo	4:25
21.	"Tag Team Triangle (Moodymann Edit)"	Blissom & Merkin	9:44
22.	"How Do I Go On (Moodymann Edit)"	Joeski featuring Jesante	8:16
23.	"Fall for You (Sandy Rivera Classic Mix)"	Kings of Tomorrow featuring April	5:37
24.	"Hostile Takeover"	Soulful Session & Lynn Lockamy	4:25
25.	"Our Darkness"	Anne Clark	6:30
26.	"Jeux de Langues"	Peter Digital Orchestra	4:20
27.	"Around (Solomun Vox)"	Noir & Haze	6:59
28.	"1044 Coplin (Give You Whatcha Lookin 4)"	Marcellus Pittman	4:00
29.	"It's House Music (Moodymann Edit)"	Lady Alma	5:38
30.	"Did You Ever (Moodymann Edit)"	Daniela La Luz	6:30

== Charts ==
Chart	Peak position
UK Dance Albums (Official Charts)	9
US Top Dance Albums (Billboard)	8
US Heatseekers Albums (Billboard)	21
