= Dallas Tamaira =

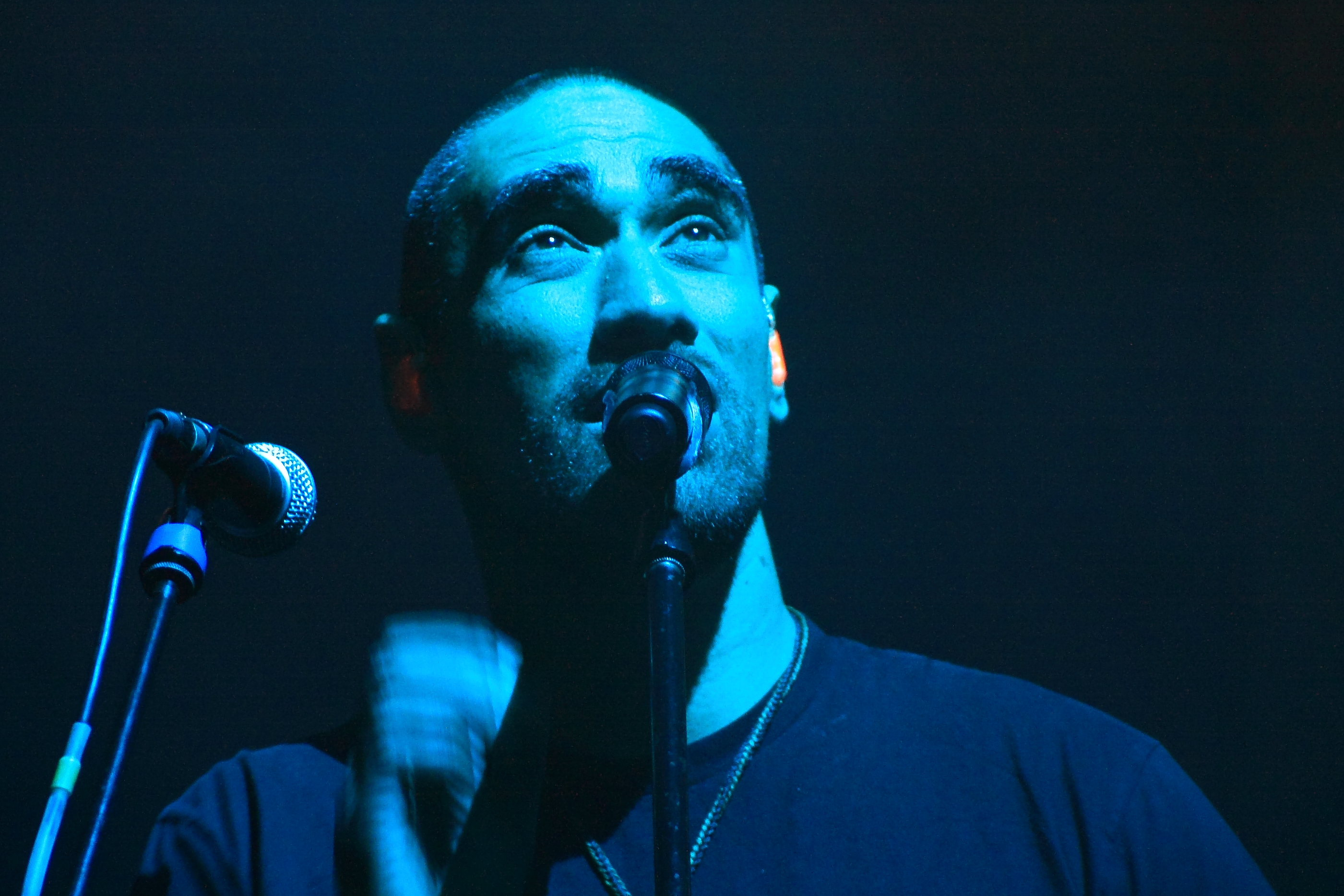
- Tamaira in 2013

Background information
- Also known as: Joe Dukie
- Born: 3 June 1974 (age 52); Christchurch, Canterbury Region, New Zealand
- Origin: Kaikōura, Canterbury, New Zealand
- Genres: Dub; jazz; reggae; roots; rhythm and blues; jam; techno; funk
- Years active: 1993-present
- Labels: The Drop; Sony; Sonar Kollektiv
- Member of: Fat Freddy's Drop
- Formerly of: Pacific Underground; Bongmaster

Dallas Tamaira, occasionally known by the alias Joe Dukie (Ngāti Tūwharetoa; born 3 June 1974), is a New Zealand singer-songwriter and musician, best known for being the vocalist for the urban pasifika and dub group Fat Freddy's Drop. A multi-instrumentalist, he mainly plays guitar and keyboard, and is noted for his "handsome, pure tenor" voice. Tamaira is credited with helping bring New Zealand reggae to worldwide prominence.

== Early life ==
Tamaira was born in Christchurch in 1974 to a mixed Ngāti Tūwharetoa and Pākehā family, and grew up in Kaikōura. Whilst he had little contact with his father when he grew up, it was his father's influence that got him into music. Upon leaving secondary school, Tamaira joined the Auckland performing arts collective Pacific Underground, before moving to Wellington in the early 1990s.

== Career ==
Tamaira formed the music duo Bongmaster with Chris Faiumu, with whom he formed Fat Freddy's Drop in 1999. The band self-released their breakthrough debut album, Based on a True Story, in 2005. Tamaira was awarded Best Vocalist at the bNet NZ Music Awards the same year. He made the comic strip on the cover and sleeve of Fat Freddy's Drop's EP Hope for a Generation (2004).

Tamaira has recently released solo work with producer Devin Abrams.

== Discography ==
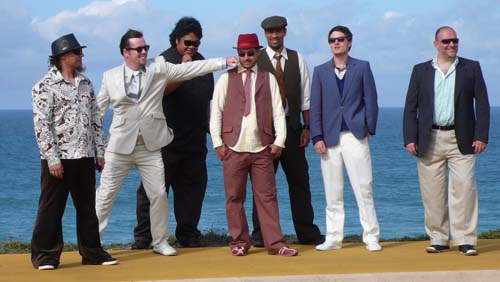
Fat Freddy's Drop during a European tour in 2008. Left to right: Tehimana Kerr, Joe Lindsey, Chris Faiumu, Iain Gordon, Dallas Tamaira, Toby Laing, and Scott Towers.

=== Solo (under the name "Dallas") ===
- Better Than Change EP (The Drop, 1999)
- The Garden, on the compilation Styles Upon Styles Part Two (Sugarlicks, 2002)

=== With Bongmaster (Dallas, Iain Gordon, Mu, Antsmif) ===
- Bongmaster, "Ground My Ego," Loop Select 003 (Loop, 2002)

=== With DJ Fitchie ===
- Seconds b/w "Grounded" (Especial, 2005)
- This Room [split 12" with Fat Freddy's Drop] (Best Seven, 2003)
- Midnight Marauders b/w dub version (Best Seven, 2002)
- Midnight Marauders b/w "Seconds" (The Drop, 2002)

=== With Fat Freddy's Drop ===
See Fat Freddy's Drop discography.

=== Appearances on other artists' tracks ===
- Tubbs, Five Day Night [w/New Chefs Mix and Baloo Mix] (Carbon, 2003)
- Tubbs, Falling (Carbon, 2003)
- Twinset, Sweet Thing (Loop, 2003)
- Markus Enochson, Follow Me (Vinyl Junkies, 2004)
- Del Rey System, Sweet Division (Bounce Records, 2005)
- Bongmaster Inc - Brothers & Sisters (2004)
- Shapeshifter, Long White Cloud (Truetone, 2004)
- Eva Be, No Memory of Time (Best Seven, 2004)
- Clara Hill, Flawless Part Two (Sonar Kollektiv, 2004)
- Tubbs, Five Day Night [w/Fat Freddy's Drop Mix and Baloo Mix] (Exceptional, 2005)
- Boozoo Bajou, Take It Slow (Studio !K7, 2005)
- Dutch Rhythm Combo, Venom (Pulver, 2005)
- Recloose, Dust (Peacefrog Records, 2005)
- Recloose, Time Is on Your Side (Peacefrog Records, 2005)
- The Nextmen, Did No Wrong (Antidote Records, 2007)
- The Nextmen, The Drop (Antidote Records, 2007)
- Recloose, Deeper Waters (Peacefrog Records, 2008)
- Pacific Heights, Peace (TruTone, 2008)
- Jazzanova, What Do You Want ?, (Sonar Kollektiv, 2008)
- The Bamboos, "Venom"
- Shapeshifter, "My Way", "Long White Cloud"
- Julien Dyne, "Resolution" (Soundway Records, 2021)
- The Upbeats, "Beams" (Vision Records, 2021)

== Personal life ==
Tamaira's alternative stage name is inspired from his father Joe, also a singer, and his grandfather, a musician nicknamed Dukie after Duke Ellington. Tamaira is Māori.

He has stated that his style is influenced by Bill Withers.
