= Moodymann (album) =

Studio album by Moodymann
- Released: January 27, 2014
- Genre: Detroit techno, house, psychedelic soul
- Length: 75:25
- Label: KDJ
- Producer: Moodymann

Moodymann chronology
ABCD (2013)	Moodymann (2014)	DJ-Kicks (2016)

Professional ratings
Aggregate scores
Source	Rating
Metacritic	83/100
Review scores
Source	Rating
Exclaim!	9/10
Fact	3.5/5
Pitchfork	7.8/10
Resident Advisor	4.5/5
Spin	7/10

Moodymann is a 2014 studio album by American electronic musician Moodymann, released through KDJ.

== Critical reception ==
At Metacritic, which assigns a weighted average score out of 100 to reviews from mainstream critics, the album received an average score of 83% based on 7 reviews, indicating "universal acclaim".

Andy Beta of Pitchfork said: "While almost every second of Moodymann's oeuvre hearkens back to his hometown, Moodymann is perhaps his most explicit ode yet." James Williams of Exclaim! described the production as "dark hypnotic melodies coupled with his signature chopped-up vocal tics, pulsing hardware synths and delightfully warped stories from his native home of Detroit." Will Lynch of Resident Advisor said, "nobody else makes house records as weird and rich as this." Ben Cardew of The Guardian called it "one of his most high-profile releases in years."

Rolling Stone placed it at number 7 on the "20 Best EDM, Electronic and Dance Albums of 2014" list. NPR placed it at number 8 on the "10 Best Electronic Albums of 2014" list. Fact listed it on the "20 Best Album Covers of 2014" list.

== Track listing ==
No.	Title	Length
1.	"Jimmy D... Nickle"	1:03
2.	"Hold It Down"	2:54
3.	"Never Quite the Same"	0:25
4.	"Desire"	4:24
5.	"You're 2 Moody"	0:25
6.	"Lyk U Use 2"	5:43
7.	"No"	4:15
8.	"I Got Werk"	3:29
9.	"Max Julien Jacket"	0:16
10.	"Iguessuneverbeenlonely"	2:43
11.	"U Don't Even Lyk This Song"	0:32
12.	"Come 2 Me"	3:19
13.	"Ulooklykicecreaminthesummertyme"	6:20
14.	"How Do U Get 2 Detroit"	0:42
15.	"Radio"	3:30
16.	"Yet Unknown"	0:09
17.	"Born 2 Die"	3:11
18.	"The Most Fearful"	0:27
19.	"I Still Don't Know Yo Name"	0:28
20.	"Watchin U"	2:48
21.	"Ponydowncrew"	0:31
22.	"Got Dem Freaks Wit Me"	2:44
23.	"Freeki Muthafucka"	3:54
24.	"Sunday Hotel"	4:12
25.	"Girl"	1:50
26.	"Sloppy Cosmic"	11:49
27.	"Heaven"	3:34
