= Versus (Carl Craig album) =

Studio album by Carl Craig
- Released: May 5, 2017
- Genres: Techno; classical
- Length: 65:36
- Label: InFiné
- Producer: Carl Craig

Carl Craig chronology
Unity (2015)	Versus (2017)

Singles from Versus
- 1. "Sandstorms" Released: March 17, 2017

Versus is a studio album by Carl Craig. It was released via InFiné on May 5, 2017.

== Critical reception ==
Professional ratings
Aggregate scores
Source	Rating
Metacritic	78/100
Review scores
Source	Rating
AllMusic	4/5 stars
Clash	7/10
Exclaim!	9/10
Paste	7.3/10

At Metacritic, which assigns a weighted average score out of 100 to reviews from mainstream critics, the album received an average score of 78, based on 7 reviews, indicating "generally favorable reviews".

Paul Simpson of AllMusic gave the album 4 out of 5 stars, commenting that "Pieces will often suspensefully build up for several minutes before a beat gallops in, but it never resembles the predictable build-up-and-drop formula of most mainstream club music." Daniel Sylvester of Exclaim! wrote, "Although Versus is certainly not a place for casual Craig fans to start, nor is it designed for the dance floor crowd, it's an achievement that appropriately showcases one of Detroit's finest exports."

Mixmag placed it at number 31 on the "Top 50 Albums of 2017" list.

== Track listing ==
All tracks are written by Carl Craig, except "Barceloneta Trist" by Francesco Tristano; "The Melody" by Francesco Tristano and Rami Khalifé.

No.	Title	Length
1.	"Enter the Darkness"	1:21
2.	"Darkness"	7:12
3.	"Coding Sequence"	1:27
4.	"Sandstorms"	6:24
5.	"At Les"	8:06
6.	"You're Our Best and Only Friend"	0:32
7.	"Desire"	8:19
8.	"Barceloneta Trist"	3:34
9.	"The Melody"	6:51
10.	"Domina"	9:26
11.	"Error in Replication"	0:34
12.	"C-Beams Glitter"	1:59
13.	"Technology"	8:25
14.	"Coding Cycle"	1:26

Japanese edition bonus track
No.	Title	Length
15.	"Technology (Acoustic Version)"	8:17

== Charts ==
Chart	Peak position
Belgian Albums (Ultratop Flanders)	169
