= Moodymann =

American musician

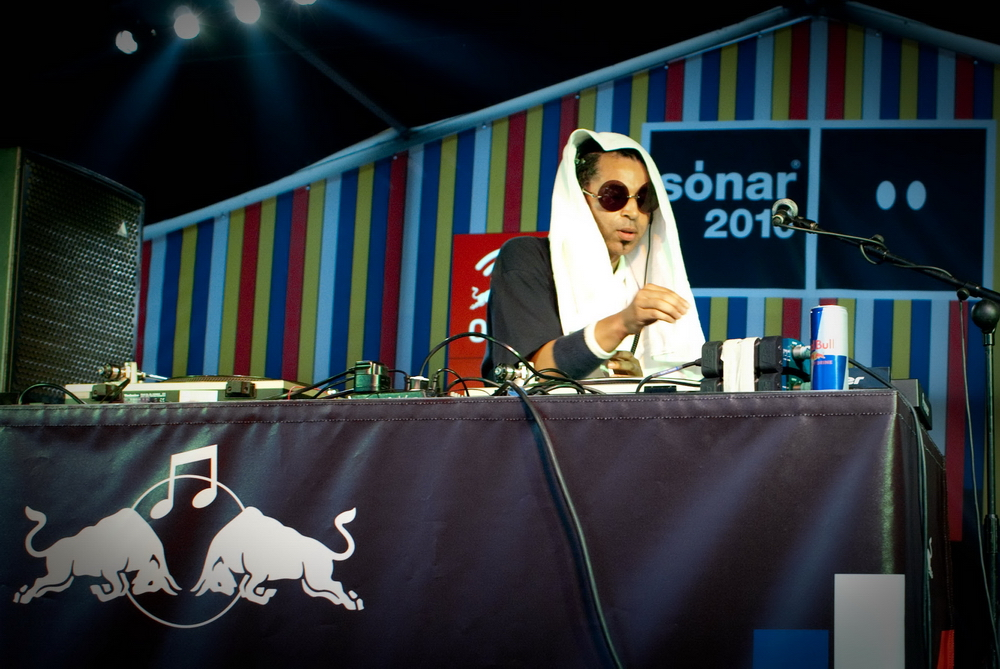
- Moodymann performing at the 2010 Sónar

Background information
- Also known as: Moody; KDJ; J.A.N.
- Born: Kenny Dixon Jr. Los Angeles, California, U.S.
- Origin: Detroit, Michigan, U.S.
- Genres: House; deep house; Detroit techno
- Occupations: Record producer; DJ
- Years active: 1992–present
- Labels: KDJ Records; Mahogani Music; Planet E Communications; Peacefrog Records
- Website: www.moodymann.com

Kenny Dixon Jr., better known by his stage name Moodymann, is an American musician based in Detroit, Michigan. He released his 1997 debut album Silentintroduction on the label Planet E Communications. He is the owner of the record labels Mahogani Music and KDJ Records. He is also a member of the group 3 Chairs.

== Early life ==
Moodymann was born in Los Angeles, CA. At three weeks old, his mother returned with him to Detroit, where both his parents are from. Moodymann frequented roller rinks as a child. As a teenager, he played drums at his grandfather's 55-and-older jazz club, but was quickly removed for lack of skill.

Before moving into house and techno, Moodymann sold beats to local hip-hop artists, including A.W.O.L., Detroit's Most Wanted, The Riddler, B-Def, and Smiley. “You would make 10 beats in a day; you used to just have cassettes floating around anywhere. I was just so happy to be producing stuff,” he told Mixmag journalist Patrick Hinton in 2023. At night, Moodymann DJed at house parties.

At this time, Moodymann, who then used the name Mr. House, partnered with the rapper Kevin Bailey, who performed under the K-Stone, and the producer Kahlil Oden, or K9. Moodymann and Bailey grew up in the same neighborhood and, in their late teens and early twenties, lived together in the house of Moodymann's father. Moodymann primarily searched through records for samples and looped them over beats. “Moody would pick some of the craziest loops, old skool loops from different types of records. He would use breakbeats and vocal samples to create various different hip hop grooves and beats,” Bailey told Mixmag.

In 1989, Warner Bros. Records offered the group a joint record deal, but two days before they signed the deal, Oden was killed in a shooting. The record label revoked the offer due to concerns over violence, according to Bailey.

Moodymann and Bailey signed to Atlanta's Ichiban Records and toured for several years. Moodymann sent techno and house recordings to record labels, but when none responded, he began releasing his music independently.

Moodymann released his first record under his current stage name in 1992. However, the record received no public response, because Moodymann botched the production. Not knowing one side of the record could only play fifteen minutes of audio, he recorded thirty minutes on each side, resulting in records that played feedback. During this time, Moodymann did not own any musical equipment. He made all of his music on borrowed instruments or discretely recorded tracks on instruments at Guitar Center.

In the mid-1990s, Moodymann worked as a resident DJ at the Outcast Motorcycle Club, a Black outlaw motorcycle club in Detroit, MI. While he produced music, Moodymann also worked at several record stores, including one owned by early Detroit techno producer Blake Baxter. Moodymann's co-workers suggested that he use the name “Moodymann,” a spin off of his nickname since childhood, Moody.

== Career ==
In 1994, Moodymann officially launched his own independent label, KDJ Records, with the release of his EP Moody Trax. Shortly thereafter, he released “The Day We Lost the Soul” (1995), a tribute to Marvin Gaye. He followed these with “Don’t Be Misled” (1996) and “I Can’t Kick This Feelin When It Hits” (1997). Because of financial constraints in the early days of the label, records varied by track length, edits, and mixes.

In 1997, Moodymann released his debut album, Silentintroduction, on Planet E Communications. It compiled the previously released tracks from his own KDJ Records. Among the ten tracks of the album, Moodymann included “I Can’t Kick This Feeling When It Hits”, a classic techno record that samples Chic's 1978 disco hit “I Want Your Love”. Silentintroduction also samples jazz, incorporates spoken word, and returns to Moodymann's techno roots. It includes the sounds of crowd noise, background chatter, and voices. He released Mahogany Brown in 1998, Forevernevermore in 2000, and Silence in the Secret Garden in 2003.

In 2012, he released Picture This as a free download. It was followed by ABCD in 2013. His self-titled album, Moodymann, was released in 2014. He released Sinner in 2019, and Taken Away in 2020. In December 2020, Moodymann portrayed a fictionalised version of himself in the video game Grand Theft Auto Online as part of an update; he serves as one of the resident DJs at a new nightclub called the Music Locker. He subsequently appeared in a July 2021 update, under the alias "KDJ". Together with his fictional girlfriend Sessanta, he becomes a member of the underground LS Car Meet, and provides the player with several contracts. Moodymann produced Kenny’s Backyard Boogie Mix — a playlist of house, soul, hip-hop, and other genres — for the game.

== Soul Skate ==
Since 2007, Moodyman has hosted a biannual Memorial Day roller skating party in Detroit called Soul Skate. Moodymann does not exclusively perform at Soul Skate, nor is the event exclusively for disco; DJs from other major American cities play house, funk, and hip-hop.

In 2018, Dazed magazine produced a documentary short film about the event. Moodymann provides narration and three of his songs — “Black Mahogani,” “I Got Werk,” and “I Can’t Kick This Feeling When It Hits” — appear in the film.

In 2010, Moodymann partnered with Red Bull Music Academy to host a Soul Skate roller-skating jam in South London's Renaissance Rooms. Ten Detroit dancers between the ages of 8 and 80 performed at the event. Moodymann performed alongside Horse Meat Disco, a London-based disco band.

== Style and influences ==
Moodymann is considered to have "developed hybrid modes of recording and performance incorporating analog and digital media—the playing of 'real' instruments with 'pushing buttons live'." Philip Sherburne of Pitchfork wrote: "His sample-heavy productions have drawn on artists like Stevie Wonder, Marvin Gaye, and Chic, not to mention gospel music, and his beats have always remained rooted in disco's bump and swirl."

Critic Ben Cardew argues that Moodymann influenced lo-fi house and outsider house in the 2010s, as well as chillwave, a 2000s-era microgenre inspired by the music of the 1970s and 1980s.

Moodymann credits Mojo, Marvelous Marv, Robert Plant and Led Zeppelin as musical influences. He grew up listening to the WJZZ radio station. Moodymann took much of his musical influences from the roller rink, where he regularly danced to Kraftwerk's “Trans-Europe Express.” For years, Moodymann says, he thought they were Black men from Detroit before learning that Kraftwerk comes from Germany.

== Personal life ==
In January 2019, Moodymann released a video on Instagram, which he later removed, showing the Highland Park police holding him at gunpoint in his parked car, on his property. The Highland Park police department released a statement saying that during the incident, Moodymann did not show proof of ownership of the property or an ID, which led to the arrest. Moodymann was later released after an investigation showing that he was indeed the owner of the property.

Moodymann refuses to work with major labels and has expressed a desire to help others in his neighborhood by running his own label. Moodymann works on every release by KDJ Records, but also owns the label Mahogani Music, which releases music by other artists.

== Discography ==
=== Studio albums ===
- Silentintroduction (1997)
- Mahogany Brown (1998)
- Forevernevermore (2000)
- Silence in the Secret Garden (2003)
- Black Mahogani (2004)
- Black Mahogani II (2004)
- Det.riot '67 (2008)
- Anotha Black Sunday (2009)
- Picture This (2012)
- ABCD (2013)
- Moodymann (2014)
- Sinner (2019)
- Taken Away (2020)

=== DJ mixes ===
- Moodymann Collection (2006)
- DJ-Kicks (2016)

=== EPs ===
- The Telephone (2001)
- I Guess U Never Been Lonely (2012)

=== Singles ===
- "I Like It" / "Emotional Content" (1994)
- "Moodymann" (1995)
- "Long Hot Sex Nights" / "The Dancer" (1995)
- "The Day We Lost the Soul" (1995)
- "Don't Be Misled!" (1996)
- "I Can't Kick This Feelin When It Hits" / "Music People" (1997)
- "U Can Dance If U Want 2" (1997)
- "In Loving Memory" (1997)
- "Dem Young Sconies" / "Bosconi" (1997)
- "Silent Introduction" (1997)
- "Music Is..." (1997)
- "Joy Pt. II" (1997)
- "Amerika" (1997)
- "Forevernevermore" (1998)
- "Just Anotha Black Sunday Morning with Grandma" (1998)
- "Sunday Morning" / "Track Four" (1998)
- "Black Mahogany" (1998)
- "Shades of Jae" (1999)
- "The Thief That Stole My Sad Days... Ya Blessin' Me" (1999)
- "Don't You Want My Love" (2000)
- "Deleted Rehearsals" (2000)
- "Analog: Live" (2000)
- "J.A.N." (2001)
- "Nmywagon" (2001)
- "Sweet Yesterday" (2003)
- "Shattered Dreams" (2003)
- "Silence in the Secret Garden" (2003)
- "Untitled" (2004)
- "Ampapella" (2005)
- "How Sweed It Is" (2005)
- "I'd Rather Be Lonely" (2007)
- "Technologystolemyvinyle" (2007)
- "Ol' Dirty Vinyl" (2010)
- "Freeki Mutha F*cker (All I Need Is U)" (2011)
- "Why Do U Feel" (2012)
- "Sloppy Cosmic" / "Hangover" (2014)
- "Neu Geu Jeup" (2017)
- "Pitch Black City Reunion" / "Got Me Coming Back Rite Now" (2018)
- "Korean Caster Meltdown" (2019)
- "Viper Is Above" (2021)
- "LPL >> LCK" (2023)

=== Productions ===
- Norma Jean Bell – "Yes I Am (I'm Gonna Get You)", "Nobody", and "Mystery" from Come into My Room (2001)
- José James – "Desire (Moodymann Remix)" from Desire & Love (2008)
- Andres – II (2009)
- Rick Wilhite – "Drum Patterns & Memories (Moodymann Mix)" from The Godson & Soul Edge (2010)
- José James – "Detroit Loveletter" from Blackmagic (2010)
- Junior Boys – "Banana Ripple (Moodymann Remix)" from Even Truer (2013)
- Dua Lipa - "Break My Heart (Moodymann Remix)" (2020)
