= Blackbird (Fat Freddy's Drop album) =

Studio album by Fat Freddy's Drop
- Released: 21 June 2013
- Genres: Dub; jazz; reggae; roots
- Length: 64:00
- Label: The Drop
- Producer: Fat Freddy's Drop

Fat Freddy's Drop chronology
Dr Boondigga and the Big BW (2009)	Blackbird (2013)	Bays (2015)

Professional ratings
Review scores
Source	Rating
AltSounds	4.5/5 stars
Doubtful Sounds	4/5 stars
The New Zealand Herald	4/5 stars
The Skinny	2/5 stars
Clash	7/10
Exclaim!	7/10

Blackbird is the third studio album by the New Zealand group Fat Freddy's Drop, released on 21 June 2013 on their own record label, The Drop. The album was a critical and commercial success, spending 4 weeks at the top of the New Zealand albums chart, and has been certified platinum.

== History ==
The album was recorded at the band's own studio, Bays, which is one of the last vinyl pressing plants in New Zealand, and also was at one time an apostolic church. On recording at Bays, Fitchie explained that "What you hear on the album is the sound of Bays; the room itself, the vibe of the place and the performance we can get out of the band in there." Describing the album, Chopper Reedz stated that "Blackbird is truer to FFD's musical philosophy than anything else we've done. The song structures are open and unruly – just like our live shows – whilst we've pushed ourselves to deliver rich and deeply layered arrangements that showcase Joe Dukie's exceptional voice. We feel totally at home melding together this unholy mix of disco, rootsy dub, blues, soul and electronic funk – it's what we do."

On 20 October 2013, Fat Freddy's Drop released a deluxe edition of Blackbird, including a bonus disc with eight previously unreleased tracks, a 60 page case bound booklet with exclusive pictures and liner notes, and exclusive album interludes from the cutting room floor.

== Reception ==
The album was a commercial success, debuting at number 1 on the New Zealand albums chart and staying in that position for 4 weeks. The album has been certified Platinum in New Zealand. The album has also received positive critical reception. Doubtful Sounds gave the album a very positive review, describing it as "without doubt their most cohesive and rewarding work to date." The New Zealand Herald gave it a positive review, stating "what's also amazing is that these days it takes something magical to engage and pique people's short attention spans – but Fat Freddy's do it." AltSounds praised the album, saying it "is a triumphant return to top form for Fat Freddy's Drop, an undeniable work of art created through love, passion and friendship."

== Track listing ==
Blackbird track listing
No.	Title	Length
1.	"Blackbird"	9:27
2.	"Russia"	5:31
3.	"Clean the House"	4:14
4.	"Silver and Gold"	6:10
5.	"Bones"	7:31
6.	"Soldier"	6:33
7.	"Never Moving"	8:01
8.	"Mother Mother"	8:59
9.	"Bohannon"	7:20
Total length:		64:00

Deluxe edition bonus disc
No.	Title	Length
1.	"Never Moving (the original)"	1:31
2.	"Barney Miller"	5:47
3.	"Tropo"	6:27
4.	"So You Wanna"	3:56
5.	"Blue Logg"	1:50
6.	"Cheap Wine"	7:38
7.	"Maranouchi"	2:49
8.	"Yacht Ride Dub"	3:56
Total length:		33:54; Total: 97:54

== Charts ==
Chart performance for Blackbird
Chart (2013)	Peak position
Australian Albums (ARIA)	11
Belgian Albums (Ultratop Flanders)	72
Belgian Albums (Ultratop Wallonia)	178
Danish Albums (Hitlisten)	26
Dutch Albums (Album Top 100)	65
French Albums (SNEP)	188
German Albums (Offizielle Top 100)	65
New Zealand Albums (RMNZ)	1
Swiss Albums (Schweizer Hitparade)	55
UK Albums (Official Charts)	59

== Certifications ==
Certifications for Blackbird
Region	Certification	Certified units/sales
New Zealand (RMNZ)	3× Platinum	45,000^{‡}
^{‡} Sales+streaming figures based on certification alone.
