= Based on a True Story (Fat Freddy's Drop album) =

Studio album by Fat Freddy's Drop
- Released: 2 May 2005
- Recorded: Wellington, New Zealand 2005
- Genres: Dub; roots; reggae; jazz
- Length: 69:55
- Label: The Drop
- Producer: DJ Fitchie

Fat Freddy's Drop chronology
Live at the Matterhorn (2001)	Based on a True Story (2005)	Dr Boondigga and the Big BW (2009)

Singles from Based on a True Story
- 1. "Wandering Eye" Released: 12 December 2005

Based on a True Story is the first studio album by New Zealand group Fat Freddy's Drop. It was recorded in Wellington and released on the band's own label, The Drop. Based on a True Story utilized the band's trademark dub, reggae, soul and funk influenced sound, and has been successful both in terms of sales and of critical reception. The album followed years of regular touring within New Zealand, a live album, several singles, and appearances on numerous compilation albums in New Zealand and internationally.

Whilst the track listing named previously successful singles such as "Hope" and "This Room", these songs were in fact rerecorded in entirely new versions for the album. Based on a True Story has to date also spawned a highly successful single in its own right: Wandering Eye, which was awarded the prize for Best Music Video at the 2006 New Zealand Music Awards (18 October).

The album made an impact internationally as well. Listeners of Gilles Peterson's BBC Worldwide Program voted it as Album of the Year for 2005.

== Sales and recognition ==
Professional ratings
Review scores
Source	Rating
AllMusic	link
Sonar	link
PopMatters	7/10
IGN	8.8/10

The album debuted at number 1 and went gold in its first day, and so far has become the longest album by a New Zealand group/artist to stay at number 1 (10 weeks). As of June 23, 2016 the album had been in the New Zealand charts for 108 weeks and had gone 9 times Platinum, selling over 135,000 copies . The album was praised for its sophisticated musicianship that retained "the relaxed energy and spontaneity of a jam".

In 2005, Based on a True Story won the New Zealand Music Awards for 'Album of the Year', an unusual achievement for an independent label. 'Based On A True Story' also features appearances from New Zealand musicians including Ladi 6, P Digsss, Hollie Smith, Rio Hemopo & Riki Gooch, Nick Gaffaney, Chris Yeabsley & Aaron Tokona.

== Track listing ==
No.	Title	Length
1.	"Ernie"	7:17
2.	"Cay's Crays"	7:07
3.	"This Room"	5:00
4.	"Ray Ray"	7:38
5.	"Dark Days"	6:40
6.	"Flashback"	6:30
7.	"Roady" (features P Digsss and Ladi 6)	7:08
8.	"Wandering Eye"	9:49
9.	"Del Fuego"	5:24
10.	"Hope" (features Hollie Smith)	7:19

== Band members ==
- Joe Dukie (Dallas Tamaira) - Vocals
- Tony Chang (Toby Laing) - Trumpet
- Fulla Flash (Warren Maxwell) - Saxophone
- Jetlag Johnson (Tehi Kerr) - Electric Guitar
- Dobie Blaze (Iain Gordon) - Keyboards
- DJ Fitchie (DJ Mu) - Mix
- Hopepa (Joe Lindsay) - Trombone
- MC slave (mc)

== Certifications ==
Certifications for Based on a True Story
Region	Certification	Certified units/sales
New Zealand (RMNZ)	12× Platinum	180,000^{‡}
^{‡} Sales+streaming figures based on certification alone.

== See also ==
- List of best-selling albums in New Zealand
