= Dr Boondigga and the Big BW =

Studio album by Fat Freddy's Drop
- Released: 2 June 2009
- Genres: Dub, jazz, reggae, roots
- Length: 69:29
- Label: The Drop
- Producer: Fat Freddy's Drop

Fat Freddy's Drop chronology
Based on a True Story (2005)	Dr Boondigga and the Big BW (2009)	Blackbird (2013)

Professional ratings
Review scores
Source	Rating
Allmusic	3.5/5 stars
The Dominion Post	4/5 stars
The New Zealand Herald	4/5 stars
The Guardian	
Clash	8/10
PopMatters	6/10

Dr Boondigga and the Big BW is the second studio album by the New Zealand group Fat Freddy's Drop, released on 2 June 2009 on The Drop. The album became a number-one album in New Zealand in its first week of release and was certified Platinum in four days. It has since been certified 2× Platinum.

The record was the highest-selling album in New Zealand for that year, selling over 30,000 copies.

== Track listing ==
All songs written and performed by Fat Freddy's Drop.

1. "Big BW" – 6:15
2. "Shiverman" – 10:36
3. "Boondigga" – 6:00
4. "The Raft" – 7:13
5. "Pull the Catch" – 5:18
6. "The Camel" featuring Alice Russell – 9:38
7. "The Nod" – 8:41
8. "Wild Wind" – 6:58
9. "Breakthrough" – 8:50

== Charts ==
Chart (2009)	Peak position
Australian Albums (ARIA)	45
French Albums (SNEP)	97
German Albums (Offizielle Top 100)	97
New Zealand Albums (RMNZ)	1
