= Live at the Matterhorn =

2001 live album by Fat Freddy's Drop

Live album by Fat Freddy's Drop
- Released: May 2001
- Recorded: Wellington, New Zealand
- Genre: Dub; roots; reggae
- Length: 70:08
- Label: The Drop
- Producer: DJ Fitchie

Fat Freddy's Drop chronology
Live at the Matterhorn (2001)	Based on a True Story (2005)

Professional ratings
Review scores
Source	Rating
Smokecds.com	(not rated)

Live at the Matterhorn is the first live album by reggae band Fat Freddy's Drop.

The album was recorded live at the Matterhorn restaurant in Cuba Mall, Wellington, New Zealand. The cover of the album features a photo of The Bucket Fountain, which is located near the Matterhorn. Although the album only contains four songs it plays for 70 minutes.

Out of print since 2004, Live at the Matterhorn was re-released on 24 June 2005 after the debut of their second album, Based on a True Story.

== Track listing ==
1. "Runnin" – 21:28
2. "Rain" – 18:05
3. "No Parking" – 18:36
4. "Bounce" – 11:59
