= Special Edition Part 1 =

2019 album by Fat Freddy's Drop

Studio album by Fat Freddy's Drop
- Released: 16 November 2019
- Length: 34:50
- Label: The Drop
- Producer: Fat Freddy's Drop

Fat Freddy's Drop chronology
Bays (2015)	Special Edition Part 1 (2019)	Lock-In (2020)

Singles from Special Edition Part 1
- 1. "Trickle Down" Released: 20 July 2018; 2. "Kamo Kamo" Released: 10 October 2019

Special Edition Part 1 is the sixth studio album by New Zealand band Fat Freddy's Drop. The band's first release in four years since Bays (2015), Special Edition Part 1 was written intended to be the first part of a double-album. The album featured the singles "Trickle Down" (2018) and "Kamo Kamo" (2019), and reached number four on the New Zealand albums chart.

== Production ==
Special Edition Part 1 was recorded as part one of a double-album. The album features three songs from the band's live performance repertoire: "Kamo Kamo", "OneFourteen" and "Special Edition", alongside three unreleased songs. The album was recorded in Wellington, at Bays, Fat Freddy's Drop's home studio.

The cover art for the album was created by Wellington artist Otis Chamberlain.

== Release and promotion ==
"Trickle Down" was released as the first single from the album in July 2018. This was followed by "Kamo Kamo" on 10 October 2019, which was paired with the official announcement of Special Edition Part 1. Following the release of the album, the band held Fat Freddy's Drop Summer Record Tour 2020, an eight date tour across New Zealand held from December 2019 to February 2020, including dates at Western Springs Outer Fields in Auckland and Horncastle Arena in Christchurch.

While the second part of the double album was originally intended to be released in 2020, Fat Freddy's Drop's following album Lock-In was a special studio live session recorded at the Michael Fowler Centre recorded during the early days of the COVID-19 pandemic in New Zealand in 2020. Lock-In features studio live version of several tracks from Special Edition Part 1: "Special Edition", "SixEight", "114" and "Trickle Down".

== Critical reception ==
Tim Gruar of Ambient Light Blog gave the album four out of five stars, describing the album as a collection of "funky jams and festival favourites".

== Track listing ==
Special Edition Part 1 track listing
No.	Title	Writer(s)	Length
1.	"Kamo Kamo"	Dallas Tamaira; Chris Faiumu; Desmond Kerr; Joe Lindsay	5:22
2.	"OneFourteen"	Tamaira; Faiumu	6:51
3.	"Raleigh Twenty"	Tamaira; Faiumu	5:20
4.	"Special Edition"	Tamaira; Faiumu	6:30
5.	"Trickle Down"	Tamaira; Faiumu	5:28
6.	"Six-Eight Instrumental"	Tamaira; Faiumu	5:19
Total length:			34:50

== Credits and personnel ==
=== Members of Fat Freddy's Drop ===
- Chris (Mu) Faiumu
- Iain Gordon
- Tehimana Kerr
- Toby Laing
- Joe Lindsay
- Dallas Tamaira
- Scott Towers

=== Other personnel ===
- Otis Chamberlain – artwork
- Julien Dyne – drums
- Fat Freddy's Drop – producer
- Inject – design
- Tyrone McCarthy – bass
- Will Ricketts – percussion
- Iraia Whakamoe – drums

== Charts ==
=== Weekly charts ===
Weekly chart performance for Special Edition Part 1
Chart (2019)	Peak position
New Zealand Albums (RMNZ)	4

=== Year-end charts ===
Year-end chart performance for Special Edition Part 1
Chart (2019)	Position
New Zealand Artist Albums (RMNZ)	19
