= Carl Craig =

American electronic music producer and DJ (born 1969)

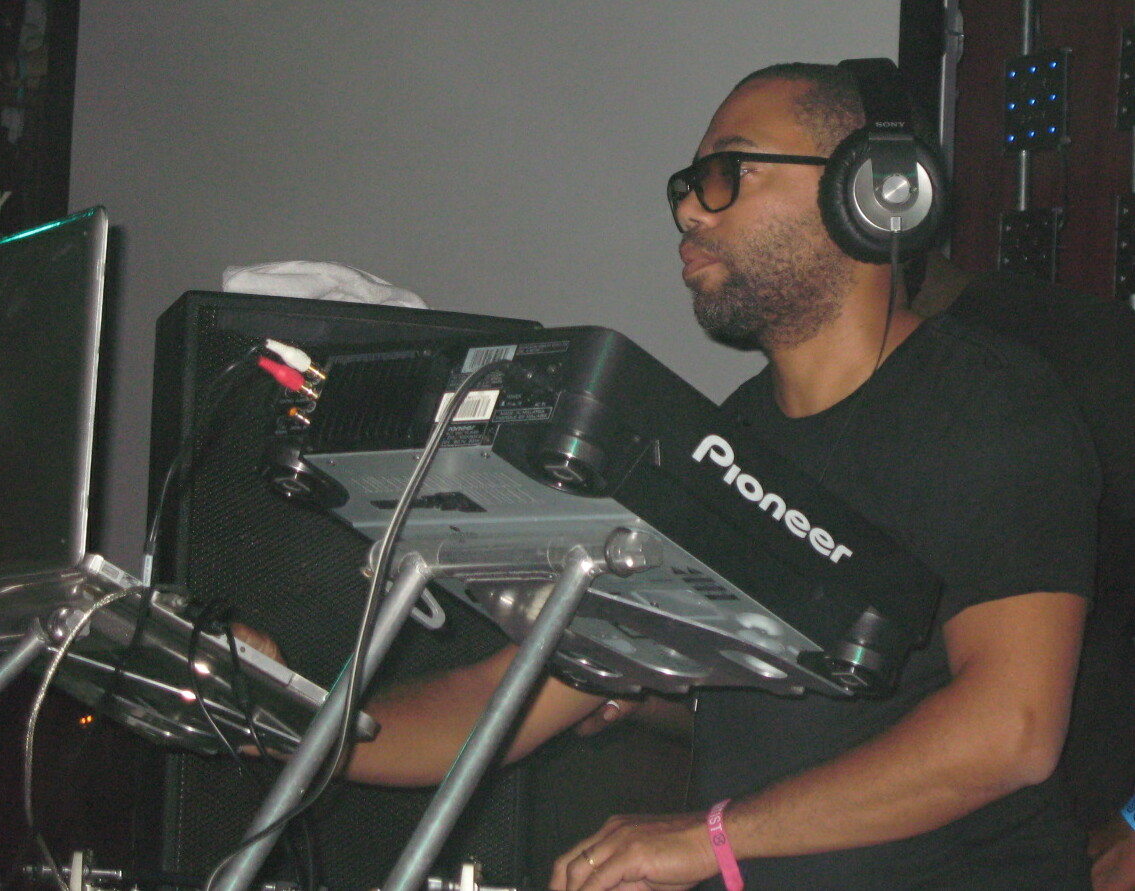
- Craig DJing in 2010

Background information
- Also known as: Psyche; BFC; 69; Paperclip People; Innerzone Orchestra
- Born: May 22, 1969 (age 57); Detroit, Michigan, U.S.
- Genres: Electronic; Detroit techno; ambient techno; house; breakbeat; classical
- Occupations: Producer; DJ
- Years active: 1989–present
- Labels: Planet E; Blanco y Negro; Deutsche Grammophon; InFiné; Transmat; Retroactive
- Website: carlcraig.net

Carl Craig (born May 22, 1969) is an American electronic music producer, DJ, and founder of the record label Planet E Communications. He is known as a leading figure and pioneer in the second wave of Detroit techno artists during the late 1980s and early 1990s. He has recorded under his given name in addition to a variety of aliases, including Psyche, BFC, and Innerzone Orchestra.

Craig's early releases were collected on the 1996 compilation Elements 1989–1990. He has released several studio albums, beginning with Landcruising (1995). Craig has also remixed a variety of artists including Manuel Göttsching, Maurizio, Theo Parrish, Tori Amos, and Depeche Mode. He was nominated for the 2008 Grammy Award for Best Remixed Recording for his remix of the Junior Boys track "Like a Child." He has released collaborative recordings with Moritz von Oswald (2008's Recomposed) and Green Velvet (2015's Unity).

== Early life ==
Carl Craig was born in Detroit, Michigan, on May 22, 1969. His mother was a teacher's assistant and his father was a post office worker. He attended Cooley High School, where he developed an interest in music. He learned to play guitar and later became interested in club music through his cousin Doug Craig, who worked lighting for Detroit area parties. After hearing Derrick May's radio show on WJLB, Craig began experimenting with recording on a dual-deck cassette player. Craig met someone who knew May and passed along a tape of some of his home studio productions.

== Career ==
Since 1989, Craig has released many recordings under a large number of aliases, including Psyche, BFC, 69, Paperclip People, and Innerzone Orchestra. Many of these early Psyche and BFC releases were collected on the 1996 compilation Elements 1989–1990. Craig founded his own record label called Planet E Communications in 1991. Since then, it has released records by other artists such as Kevin Saunderson, Moodymann, and Kenny Larkin.

His first studio album, Landcruising, was released on Blanco y Negro Records in 1995. In 1996, he released The Secret Tapes of Doctor Eich under the Paperclip People moniker. In 1997, he released More Songs About Food and Revolutionary Art. It was placed at number 29 on Pitchfork's "50 Best IDM Albums of All Time" list. In 1999, he released Programmed under the Innerzone Orchestra moniker.

Craig served as co-creator and artistic director for the Detroit Electronic Music Festival in 2000 and 2001. His subsequent dismissal by festival organizers caused substantial controversy within the Detroit techno community, igniting a high-profile campaign in his favor. In 2001, he filed a breach-of-contract lawsuit against festival producer Pop Culture Media.

He released a reworked version of Landcruising, titled The Album Formerly Known As..., in 2005. In 2008, he released a collaborative album with Moritz Von Oswald, titled Recomposed, on Deutsche Grammophon. He returned as artistic director for the 2010 Detroit Electronic Music Festival. In 2015, he released a collaborative album with Green Velvet, titled Unity, on Relief Records. In 2017, he released Versus on InFiné.

In 2020 Carl created Party/After-Party, an immersive sound and light installation that premiered at Dia:Beacon before moving to MOCA in Los Angeles, finally becoming part of the permanent collections at Dia:Beacon. The culmination of a five-year-long engagement with Dia:Beacon, it was his first foray into the art world, fusing the legacies of Detroit techno with minimalist sound art. Craig described Party/After-Party as an entry point into his own mind and experiences as a techno musician. Throughout 30 minute long immersive techno soundscapes, using beats never surpassing 100 BPM, viewers were sonically guided from party, to after party, to dawn, experiencing an evening from the perspective of the DJ, and illustrating the distinction between how Craig and the audience spend their nights once the club closes. In 2023 the installation was brought to The Geffen Contemporary at MOCA, Los Angeles, where Insomniac and Secret Project collaborated with Craig to produce the Party/After-Party Sessions, a series of three live concerts accompanying the exhibition, celebrating the legacy of techno music and platforming artists such as DJ Holographic, Felix Da Housecat, King Britt, Moodymann, and Kenny Larkin.

In 2021 Craig collaborated with Daniel Lee, then Creative Director of the Italian couture house Bottega Veneta, on their Salon O3 show- creating Runway, a multi-floor experience at the Michigan Building Theater in Detroit, featuring site-specific sonic sculptures and light installations.

Craig is the subject of a 2024 documentary titled ‘Desire, the Carl Craig Story’, directed by Jean-Cosme Delaloye, which had its world premiere at the Tribeca Film Festival in New York in June 2024. Delaloye began shooting Craig at the Movement Festival in 2022, with the 90-minute feature following him all over the world, concluding in Los Angeles, where Craig inaugurated his Party/After Party multi-sensory exhibition at MOCA in April 2023. The documentary is the story of Craig’s life, from his high school years, through his time coming up in Detroit in the wake of techno pioneers Derrick May, Kevin Saunderson and Juan Atkins, and as an artist devoted to perfecting his sound, with the story of Detroit’s decline and recovery as the backdrop. The film features insights from his family, and contributions from prominent DJs and Producers, including Laurent Garnier, DJ Minx, Moodymann and Gilles Peterson.

== Style and legacy ==
Mixmag called Carl Craig "a leading figure in Detroit techno's second generation," while Exclaim! called him a "central figure" in the genre's second wave. Pitchfork described him as "techno pioneer." He has approached techno using inspiration from a wide range of musical genres, including soul, jazz, new wave, industrial, and krautrock, while his works have spanned ambient techno, breakbeat, house, classical, and modular synthesizer-based stylings. In a 2015 interview, he cited The Electrifying Mojo, Prince, Kraftwerk, Juan Atkins, and Jeff Mills as the major influences on his music.

Landcruising is described as "synth-heavy, atmospheric techno that draws influences from beyond Detroit, yet unmistakably belongs to it. It also functions as a homage to Craig’s hometown—after all, it was conceived as a soundtrack for driving around its streets."

Craig's 1992 track "Bug in the Bassbin", released under the Innerzone Orchestra moniker, was picked up by DJs such as 4hero, Goldie, and J Majik. In the United Kingdom, DJs started playing the track at 45 rpm instead of the intended 33 rpm. According to Now, the track "ended up providing inspiration and in many ways writing the blueprint for what drum 'n' bass was to become in England."

According to Vinyl Me, Please, Craig "managed to not only push the boundaries of Detroit techno, he also introduced an urgency and melodic richness to the sometimes navel-gazing world of IDM" with releases such as More Songs About Food and Revolutionary Art (1997).

Some consider Landcruising to be among the greatest dance music albums of all time.

== Discography ==
=== Albums ===
- Landcruising (1995)
- The Secret Tapes of Doctor Eich (1996) (as Paperclip People)
- More Songs About Food and Revolutionary Art (1997)
- Programmed (1999) (as Innerzone Orchestra)
- The Album Formerly Known As... (2005)
- Recomposed (2008) (with Moritz von Oswald)
- Unity (2015) (with Green Velvet)
- Versus (2017)
- Meditations (2026)

=== Compilations ===
- The Sound of Music (1995) (as 69)
- Elements 1989–1990 (1996) (as Psyche/BFC)
- Designer Music V1 (2000)
- Abstract Funk Theory (2001)
- From the Vault: Planet E Classics Collection Vol. 1 (2006)
- The Legendary Adventures of a Filter King (2009) (as 69)

=== DJ Mixes ===
- DJ-Kicks: Carl Craig (1996)
- House Party 013: A Planet E Mix (1999)
- Onsumothasheeat (2001)
- The Workout (2002)
- Fabric 25 (2005)
- The Kings of Techno (2006) (with Laurent Garnier)
- Sessions (2008)
- Masterpiece (2013)
- Detroit Love (2019)

=== EPs ===
- 4 Jazz Funk Classics (1991) (as 69)
- Sound on Sound (1993) (as 69)
- Lite Music (1994) (as 69)
- The Floor EP (1996) (as Paperclip People)
- Just Another Day (2004)
- Paris Live (2007)

=== Singles ===
- "Crackdown" (1990) (as Psyche)
- "No More Words" (1991)
- "Oscillator" (1991) (as Paperclip People)
- "Jam the Box" (1994) (as 69)
- "Throw" (1994) (as Paperclip People)
- "The Climax" (1995) (as Paperclip People)
- "Science Fiction" (1995)
- "Bug in the Bass Bin" (1996) (as Innerzone Orchestra)
- "Floor" (1996) (as Paperclip People)
- "4 My Peepz" (1998) (as Paperclip People)
- "People Make The World Go Round" (2000) (as Innerzone Orchestra)
- "A Wonderful Life" / "As Time Goes By" (2002)
- "Sparkle" / "Home Entertainment" (2005)
- "Darkness" / "Angel" (2006)
- "Sandstorms" (2017)

== Awards and nominations ==
Award	Year of ceremony	Nominee / work	Category	Result	Ref(s)
Grammy Awards	2008	Junior Boys "Like a Child (Carl Craig Remix)"	Best Remixed Recording, Non-Classical	Nominated	
