= Bays (album) =

Studio album by Fat Freddy's Drop
- Released: 23 October 2015
- Studio: Bays, Wellington, New Zealand
- Genre: Dub; funk; reggae
- Length: 60:49
- Label: The Drop
- Producer: Fat Freddy's Drop

Fat Freddy's Drop chronology
Blackbird (2013)	Bays (2015)	Special Edition Part 1 (2019)

Bays is the fourth studio album by the New Zealand group Fat Freddy's Drop, released on 23 October 2015 through their own record label, the Drop. The album is named after the band's own studio, Bays, in Kilbirnie in southern Wellington. Bays charted internationally and topped the New Zealand albums chart, where it was also certified gold.

== Critical reception ==
Professional ratings
Review scores
Source	Rating
The AU Review	9.4/10
Drowned in Sound	7/10
The Music	4/5 stars
The New Zealand Herald	4/5 stars

Anna Wilson of Renowned for Sound described the album as having a "heavier focus on genre fusion than the group's previous releases, with a few ska undertones here and there" and ultimately called it "an easy listen and well structured, retaining Fat Freddy's Drop['s] classic chilled style". Chris Familton of The Music called it a "sublime addition to the band's discography" and wrote that the group "continue as they left off on the last album, if anything hitting a stronger strain of dark dub techno infused rhythms". The New Zealand Herald felt that the album "sees the seven-piece outfit more focused and dynamic than ever", on which Fat Freddy's Drop "warm you up, and then turn your head inside out", concluding that "the more you listen, the more you'll find to love".

Jennifer Quinlin stated that the "tunes are immersive and refined, and are as much at home in the venues of Europe as they are in the beachside cafe in Wellington. This is a perfect album for lazy summer days with friends, or a road trip with the windows down." Sam Moore of Drowned in Sound remarked that if "you're already quite familiar with FFD's genre-splicing and casual beat-dropping, then you'll likely find a lot to love in Bays", opining that it "stay[s] mostly true to that dub/reggae ethos" and the group does not "mess around too much with the agreed formula".

== Track listing ==
Bays track listing
No.	Title	Length
1.	"Wairunga Blues"	5:46
2.	"Slings & Arrows"	4:33
3.	"10 Feet Tall"	5:25
4.	"Wheels"	6:15
5.	"Razor"	8:05
6.	"Makkan"	5:12
7.	"Fish in the Sea"	9:55
8.	"Cortina Motors"	10:43
9.	"Novak"	4:55
Total length:		60:49

== Charts ==
Chart performance for Bays
Chart (2015)	Peak position
Australian Albums (ARIA)	12
Belgian Albums (Ultratop Flanders)	93
Dutch Albums (Album Top 100)	77
French Albums (SNEP)	141
German Albums (Offizielle Top 100)	35
New Zealand Albums (RMNZ)	1
Swiss Albums (Schweizer Hitparade)	93
UK Albums (OCC)	79

== Certifications ==
Certifications for Bays
Region	Certification	Certified units/sales
New Zealand (RMNZ)	Gold	7,500^{^}
^{^} Shipments figures based on certification alone.
