= Fat Freddy's Drop =

New Zealand band

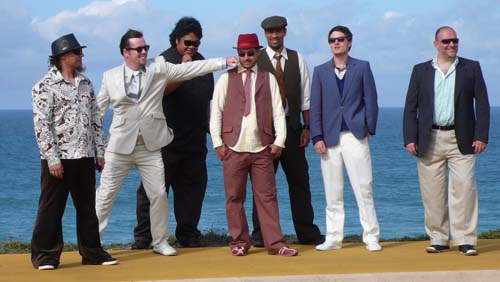
- Fat Freddy's Drop during a European tour in 2008. Left to right: Tehimana Kerr, Joe Lindsey, Chris Faiumu, Iain Gordon, Dallas Tamaira, Toby Laing, and Scott Towers.

Background information
- Origin: Wellington, New Zealand
- Genres: Dub; jazz; reggae; roots; R&B; jam; techno; funk
- Years active: 1999–present
- Label: The Drop
- Members: Dallas Tamaira; Toby Laing; Scott Towers; Conway Jeune; Iain Gordon; Joe Lindsay
- Past members: Warren Maxwell; Tehimana Kerr; Neg Ngatae; Chris Faiumu
- Website: fatfreddysdrop.com

Fat Freddy's Drop are a New Zealand seven-piece band formed in Wellington in 1999. Their musical style has been characterised as any combination of dub, reggae, soul, jazz, rhythm and blues, and techno. Originally a jam band formed in the late 1990s by musicians from other bands in Wellington, Fat Freddy's Drop gradually became its members' sole focus. Band members continued playing with their other respective groups—The Black Seeds, TrinityRoots, Bongmaster, and others—for much of their 20-year career. Fat Freddy's Drop are known for their improvised live performances. Songs on their studio albums are versions refined over years of playing them live in New Zealand and on tour abroad.

The group gained international recognition in 2003 after their single "Midnight Marauders" was re-distributed by record labels and DJs in Germany. The group has toured Europe nearly every year since then. The first studio album by Fat Freddy's Drop, Based on a True Story, was the first independently distributed album to reach first place in New Zealand record sales directly after release in 2005, and is the third highest-selling album by a national artist in the country's history. Based on a True Story won Best Album at the New Zealand Music Awards the same year, and remained on the top 40 New Zealand sales chart for over two years.

Founding member Chris Faiumu died unexpectedly on 16 July 2025.

== History ==
=== Formation: 1999–2001 ===
The band Fat Freddy's Drop gradually took shape from members of other bands in the Wellington music scene in the late 1990s. The group's founder, Chris "Mu" Faiumu, had performed with other bands for most of that decade under the name DJ Fitchie. He and two friends, trumpeter Toby Laing and vocalist Dallas Tamaira, occasionally played improvised jam sessions at his seaside home. Faiumu provided percussion and bass for these on an Akai Music Production Center (MPC). All three were involved with other bands. Faiumu and Tamaira were members of the 15-piece dub band Bongmaster; Laing was a member of The Black Seeds. In 1999, they began performing together at local clubs and festivals, and released several vinyl singles distributed locally.

That same year, Faiumu founded the independent music label The Drop with the help of his partner Nicole, and money from private investors. According to Faiumu, the venture was a learning experience in the business of making and releasing records. The Drop's first release was Dallas Tamaira's solo project, the five-track EP Better Than Change, followed by a single performed by the group named "Hope". "Hope" was written and recorded over two days under the influence of LSD, according to interviews. Each blotter — individual dose — of that type of LSD, popular in Wellington at that time, had the image of Fat Freddy's Cat (from Gilbert Shelton's comic strip The Fabulous Furry Freak Brothers) printed on it. Dropping — common slang for taking LSD — Fat Freddies became the inspiration for the band's name.

The group organised several informal jam sessions in 2000, inviting local musicians to play with them at Faiumu's home. These sessions led to four new members joining Fat Freddy's Drop: Warren Maxwell on tenor and alto saxophone, Tehimana Kerr on guitar, Iain Gordon on keyboards, and Joe Lindsay on trombone. Like the original three, the new members played with other groups in and around Wellington, and continued to for most of Fat Freddy's Drop's career. Gordon was a fellow Bongmaster member with Faiumu and Tamaira. Gordon was also a member of the band Ebb which in 2001 performed an audiovisual concert and released an EP titled Plush Bomb, with Fat Freddy's Drop playing in support. Maxwell was in the reggaemusic group TrinityRoots. Maxwell and Joe Lindsay, who make up the horn section of Fat Freddy's Drop, were students at the Conservatorium of Music in Wellington in the mid-1990s. Faiumu was the "central point [and] the reason for the band getting together," according to a 2009 interview.

=== Live at the Matterhorn and singles: 2001–2004 ===
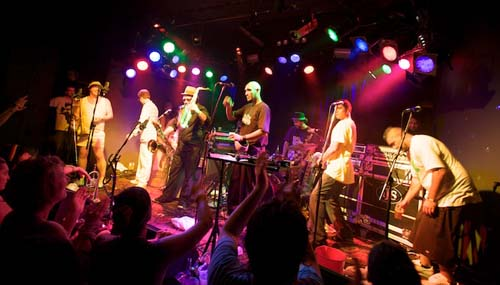
Fat Freddy's Drop performing at Hotel Great Northern in Byron Bay, Australia in 2009

The now-seven-member Fat Freddy's Drop, sometimes calling themselves the "seven-headed soul monster", continued to play live at clubs and festivals. The band's first full-length album, Live at the Matterhorn, was released in 2001 by The Drop. The live album is a recording of their show at the Matterhorn club in Wellington that year. Very little mastering was done to the album, which is divided into four tracks averaging 18 minutes each. It was not formally promoted, but sold 9,000 copies in its first few months via word-of-mouth, according to the Sydney Morning Herald.

In 2000, the New Zealand government began a campaign to increase the profitability of the country's music industry, and of music exports abroad, by funding artists and events. The percentage of music sold by nationals went from 5.45% in 2000 to 10% in 2004, and a 2004 government survey indicated one-quarter of New Zealanders attended a live music event in the year previous. Fat Freddy's Drop were not one of the bands funded, but the elevated live music scene, and the relative success of Live at The Matterhorn, gave them more opportunities to establish themselves as one of the area's best live acts. Several of their early singles, like "Hope" and "Runnin", were featured on compilation albums published by local labels and radio stations. An established group from Kaikōura named Salmonella Dub—who one member described as the "forerunner for Fat Freddys"—provided the band opportunities to play in front of larger crowds in New Zealand and neighbouring Australia.

The third single, released by The Drop in 2002, "Midnight Marauders" became their first step towards international recognition when a copy was taken to German record label Sonar Kollektiv by a producer. That year, Sonar and affiliated label Best Seven re-released the single in Germany, and European DJ group Jazzanova used the track in several mixes. A second single, "Hope/This Room", was re-released by Sonar and Best the next year. After the singles' success, Sonar invited the band to play a string of European shows in 2003. Sonar label manager Matthias Bohmbach said he was surprised when one-thousand copies of "Midnight Marauders" sold at a show in Germany. Not wanting a single label to control their work in Europe, the band also partnered with London-based label Kartel in 2003 to handle distribution and promotion in England. From 2003 to 2009, distribution of the band's work was handled by The Drop in New Zealand and Australia, by Sonar Kollektiv and Best Seven in most of Europe, and by Kartel in England.

Fat Freddy's Drop's European profile slowly increased between 2003 and the release of their first studio album in 2005. The BBC's Gilles Peterson called "Hope" one of the top tracks of 2003. The band was invited to play at the Cannes Film Festival in 2004. International DJ Magazine listed Fat Freddy's Drop as one of the "top 20 bands to look out for" in 2004. In what became an almost annual trip, they returned to touring New Zealand and Australia in 2004, and—partnering with Sonar Kollektiv—returned to Europe for an official "Hope for a Generation" tour.

=== Based on a True Story: 2005–2008 ===
Fat Freddy's Drop's first studio album in 2005, Based on a True Story, showcased polished versions of songs the band had developed gradually at live shows over the years—in some cases going back to 1999; the album's title is a reference to that process. Many Fat Freddy's Drop members still played with other Wellington bands while recording Based on a True Story, and scheduling conflicts forced them to record their individual parts at different times to be mixed later. In a later interview, they said it is "healthy for members to be able to do other things," but they hoped to record the tracks together in the same room on their next album. Replacing Faiumu's MPC sampler on the album—and in some live shows afterwards—were drummer Riki Gooch and bassist Rio Hemopo, who together with Fat Freddy's Drop saxophonist Warren Maxwell make up the band TrinityRoots. Also contributing were vocalists Hollie Smith, Ladi 6, and P Digsss, and Bongmaster guitarist Aaron Tokona. After mixing Based on a True Story for 18 months at his home studio in-between tours, Faiumu took the album to San Francisco-based Fantasy Studios to be mastered.

"Wandering Eye" (2006)
The first single of Based on a True Story demonstrates the band's reggae and soul influences.

Based on a True Story became the first independently distributed album to reach first place in New Zealand record sales directly after release, and is the third-highest-selling album by a national artist in the country's history. The Recording Industry Association of New Zealand's (RIANZ) sales chart listed Based on a True Story as one of the top 40 selling albums for more than two years after its release, and has since been certified 12× platinum, denoting shipments of 135,000 copies. The album's only single, "Wandering Eye", spent more than four months on the top 40 selling singles chart. Like Live at the Matterhorn, the album was given no formal promotion or marketing; its popularity largely due to the band's reputation in New Zealand. At the 2005 New Zealand Music Awards, Fat Freddy's Drop won awards in every category they were nominated: Best Group, Best Album, Best New Zealand Roots Group. They also won the People's Choice Award in both 2005 and 2006. Based on a True Story had sold 120,000 copies in New Zealand as of April 2009. The album sold 30,000 copies in Europe.

The band continued touring for the next four years while planning and developing a second studio album. They returned to Germany, England, and Italy in 2005; returned in 2006 for their European World Cup Tour, and again for a set of shows in 2007. They also toured the east coast of Australia in 2006 and 2007. Many band members were fathers by then, a factor increasingly affecting their "touring stamina". Warren Maxwell left the band in 2007 for family reasons, and was replaced in live performances with Scott Towers. Towers attended the Conservatorium of Music with Maxwell, and was trombonist Joe Lindsay's tutor there.

=== Dr Boondigga and the Big BW: 2009–2012 ===
Fat Freddy's Drop released their second studio album, Dr Boondigga and the Big BW, in 2009. The title refers to "the Big Brain-Wash and Dr. Boondigga [who] is some evil creature who's trying to sign us to a major label," according to Faiumu. The band is still independently distributed by The Drop label, and as of 2009, have handled distribution themselves in Europe. Like Based on a True Story, the album's songs are polished versions of songs they developed over four years at live shows; mixed from 2007 to 2009 in-between tours. Unlike their last album, most of it was recorded live in-studio with all band members present. There were some exceptions; Alice Russell's duet with Tamaira on the album's first single "The Camel" was recorded in 2006 when she was in Wellington with The Bamboos.

Dr Boondigga and the Big BW was the highest selling album in New Zealand for five weeks after its release, and the highest selling album there in 2009. It was listed on the RIANZ top 40 sales chart 38 weeks in total. The album received more international promotion than its predecessor, reaching number 45 in the Australian album chart, and 97th in France. The BBC's John Lusk called Fat Freddy's Drop "New Zealand's most critically acclaimed band since The Clean", and lead singer Tamaira, "one of the most soulful singers of his generation." At the 2009 New Zealand Music Awards the album won the awards Best Producer, and Best Aotearoa Roots Album Dr Boondigga and the Big BW had sold 30,000 copies in New Zealand as of December 2009.

Fat Freddy's Drop returned to touring New Zealand, Australia and Europe to promote the new album in 2009. Three shows on the west coast of the United States, and a show in Canada, were also included in the tour. The only previous time the band had played in the United States was a single performance at the Detroit Electronic Music festival in 2004. Before 2009, the cost of touring in the US, difficulty obtaining visas, and the band's low profile in North America prevented them from including tour dates there. Band members say they now consider playing together as Fat Freddy's Drop their first musical priority, and spend less time playing with other bands.

=== Blackbird: 2013 ===
In early 2013, the band revealed a new album was in the works, and eventually the first single, Silver and Gold was released as a vinyl and free online download. The single received significant radio airplay following its release. The album, Blackbird was released on 21 June in Ireland and in most regions, and on 24 June in others. The album debuted in the number-one position on the New Zealand album chart and remained in that position for four weeks. The band went on a national tour of Australia in late August/early September where they appeared at the Splendour in the Grass festival, and Europe for a string of dates immediately after.

=== Bays: 2015 ===
New material was teased in early in October 2014 on NZ radio and Fat Freddy's Drop released Slings and Arrows 17 October 2014. Starting with an 8-bit intro the song blossomed in to what they said was their most reggae track thus far. The subsequent album Bays was released the following year on 23 October 2015, reaching the number 1 in New Zealand and 12 In Australia. The album title is derived from their home base in Wellington where the majority of the album was written. Widening the sphere of influence which colours their music the new album features more electronic flavour in Wheels and Cortina Motors, which seems like a true evolution, and more soulful moments in Makkan where Dallas already resides.

=== Special Edition Part 1 ===
On 20 July 2018, the single Trickle Down was released and their fifth studio album, Special Edition Part 1, was confirmed. Following this, a tour of Europe commenced, which included tease performances of three new songs: Special Edition, 114, and Kamo, Kamo. On 10 October 2019, the single Kamo Kamo was released, along with an official name and release date for the upcoming album. Special Edition Part 1 was released digitally on 15 November with physical formats to follow.

=== LOCK-IN - WAIRUNGA ===
Two albums recorded sans audience, released 2020 and 2021.

=== BLACKBIRD RETURN REMIX ===
Celebrating the tenth anniversary of Blackbird, vinyl release featuring remixes by producers from around the world.

=== SLO MO ===
Freddys sixth studio album, recorded at BAYS studio and released October 2024. Dropped on vinyl first.

== Musical style and influences ==
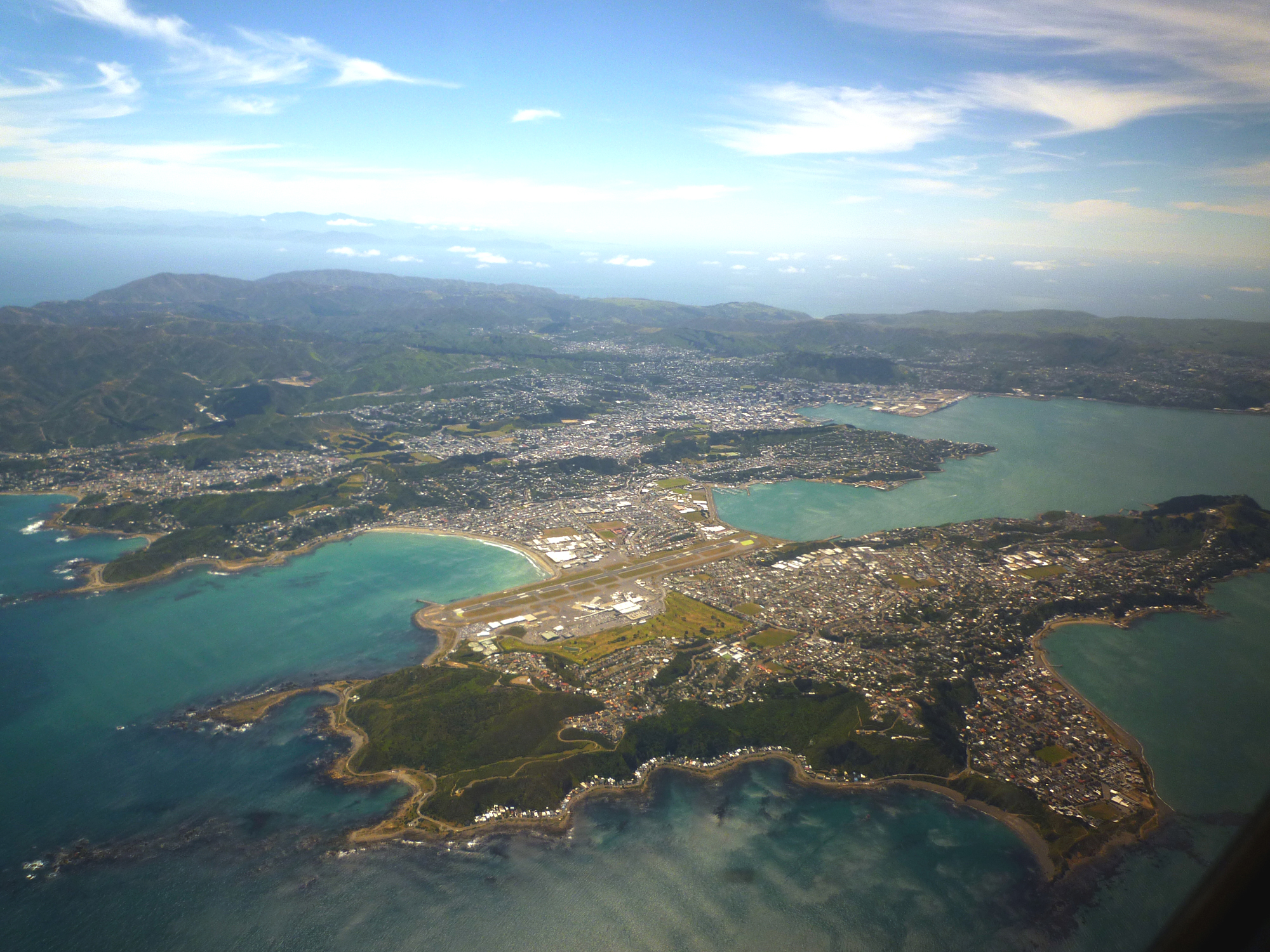
Aerial view of Southern Wellington. The band, and The Drop label, are headquartered in Lyall Bay (centre-left).

Improvisation, live and in the studio, has been the basis for Fat Freddy's Drop's music since the beginning of their career. "Live performance is the most natural state for music," according to trumpeter Toby Laing. Most songs begin as a rhythm on Faiumu's MPC, and more sections are progressively added during jam sessions. Songs featured on the band's albums and singles are versions that have been refined over years of playing them in the studio, live in Wellington, and on tour abroad. Faiumu said that, on their first studio album, it was challenging to fit the long songs the band is used to playing into shorter album-length tracks.

Describing the band, National Public Radio host Guy Raz said, "Take the swagger of Jamaican dub, throw in a little Memphis soul and send it halfway down the globe, and what comes back? The band Fat Freddy's Drop." The band has been categorised under many genres, and members say many of those genres helped shape their musical style: delta blues, jazz, dub, soul, techno, and contemporary rhythm and blues. Musical styles heard while on tour have also shaped their sound; Dr Boondigga and the Big BW was influenced by contemporary German, Portuguese, and Bhangra music while touring in the years before its release.

Faiumu and other band members say their biggest influences are their peers in Wellington's music scene. They feel their music "belong[s] here in New Zealand, you can tell it came from this country." Fat Freddy's Drop's music has been categorised as Aotearoa roots music—meaning contemporary music inspired by Māori and Pasifika culture, even though they are a mixed-race group. Faiumu was a first-generation Samoan New Zealander, Tamaira, Gordon and Kerr are Māori, and the remaining members are descended from European immigrants.

== Band members ==
- Dallas Tamaira ("Joe Dukie") – vocals, guitar (1999–present)
- Toby Laing ("Tony Chang") – trumpet (1999–present)
- Iain Gordon ("Dobie Blaze") – keyboards (2000–present)
- Joe Lindsay ("Hopepa") – trombone, tuba (2000–present)
- Scott Towers ("Chopper Reedz") – saxophone (2007–present)
- Conway Jeune (C-Way Green) - Guitar (2024–present)
- Mark Williams ("MC Slave") – raps (live on stage)

Former members

- Chris Faiumu ("DJ Mu" / "DJ Fitchie") – percussion, production (1999–2025; his death)
- Tehimana Kerr ("Jetlag Johnson") – guitar (2000–2021)
- Neg Ngatae ("ManRaro") – guitar (2021-2023)
- Warren Maxwell ("Fulla Flash") – saxophone (2000–2007)
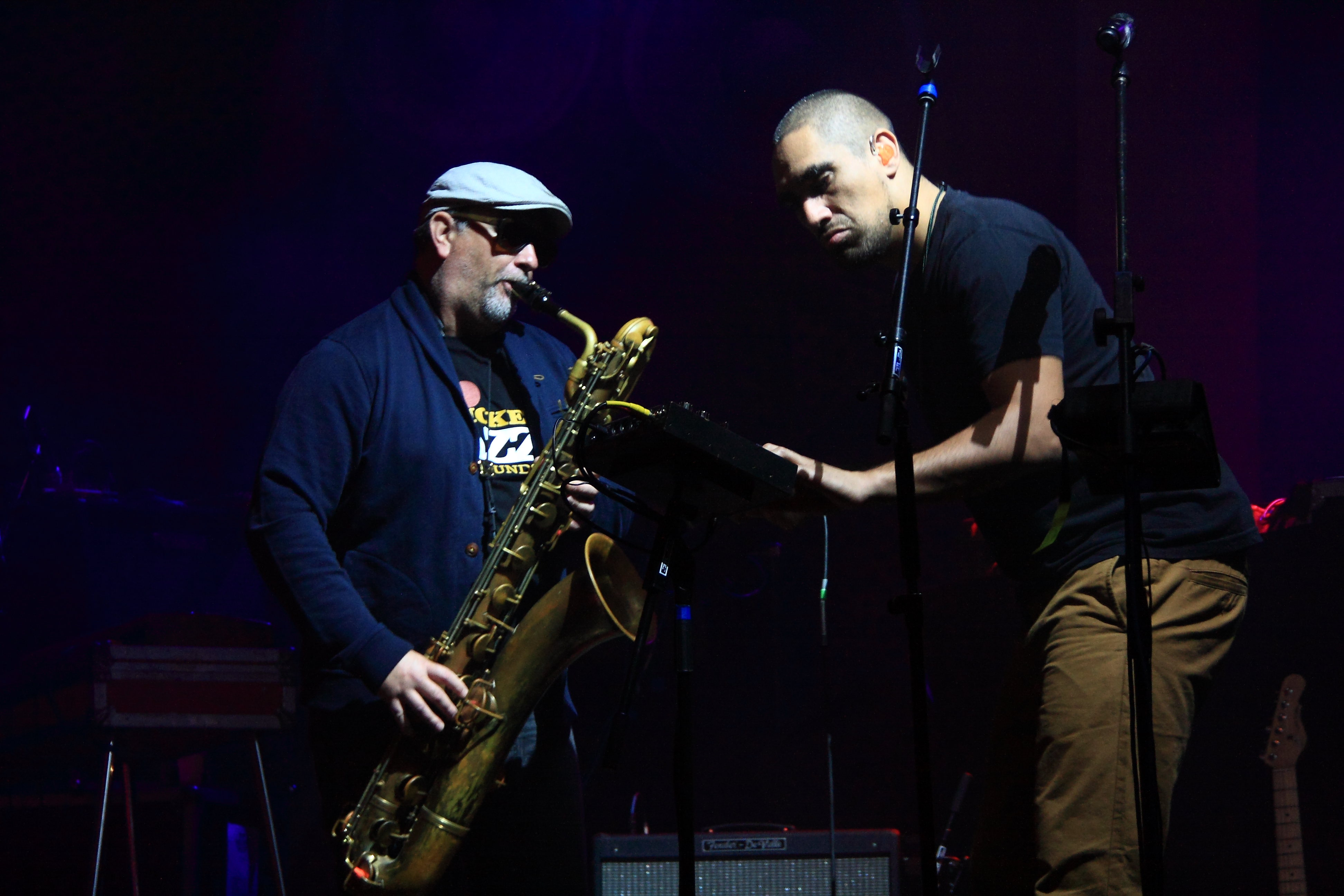
Chopper Reedz & Joe Dukie at sampling

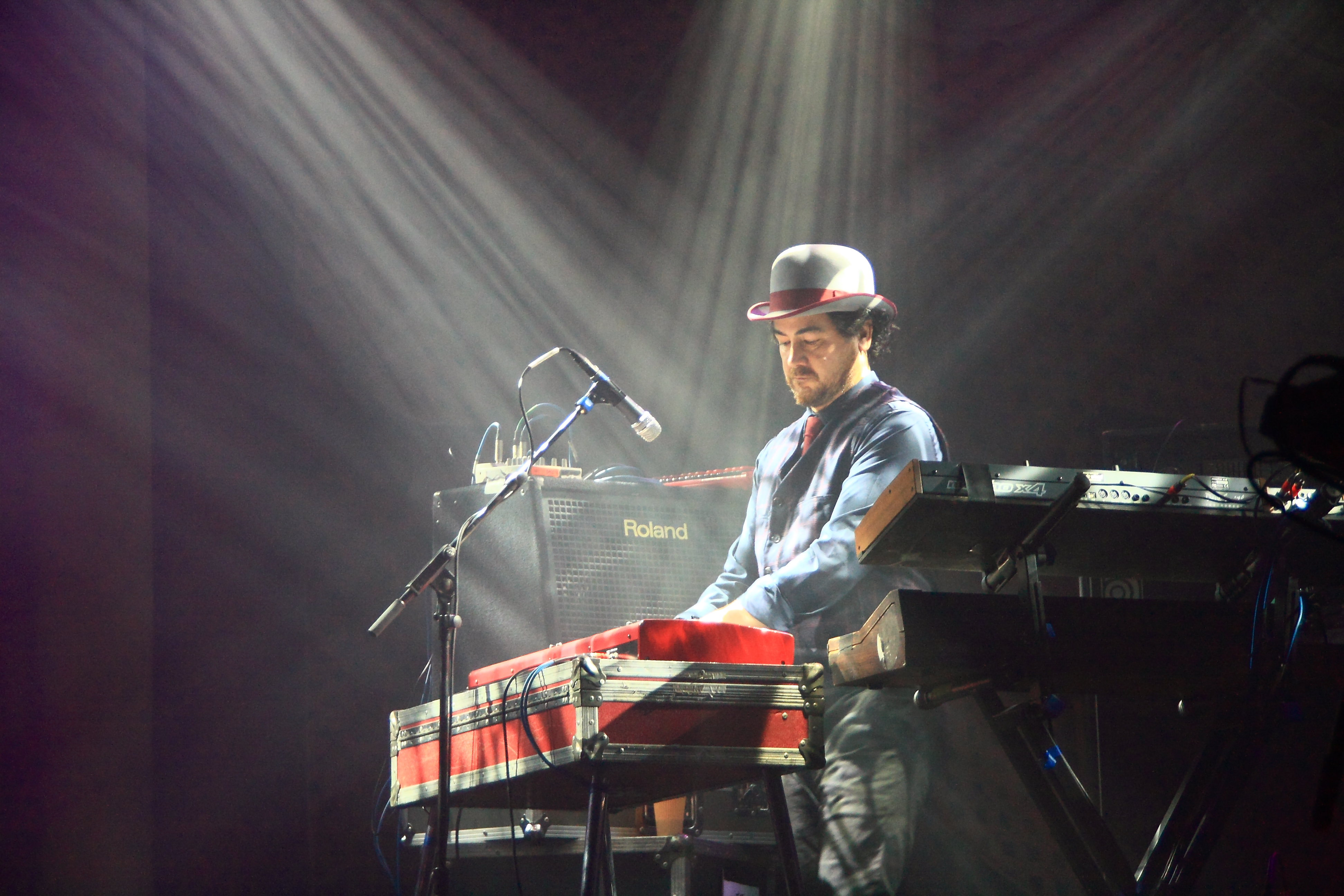
Dobie Blaze

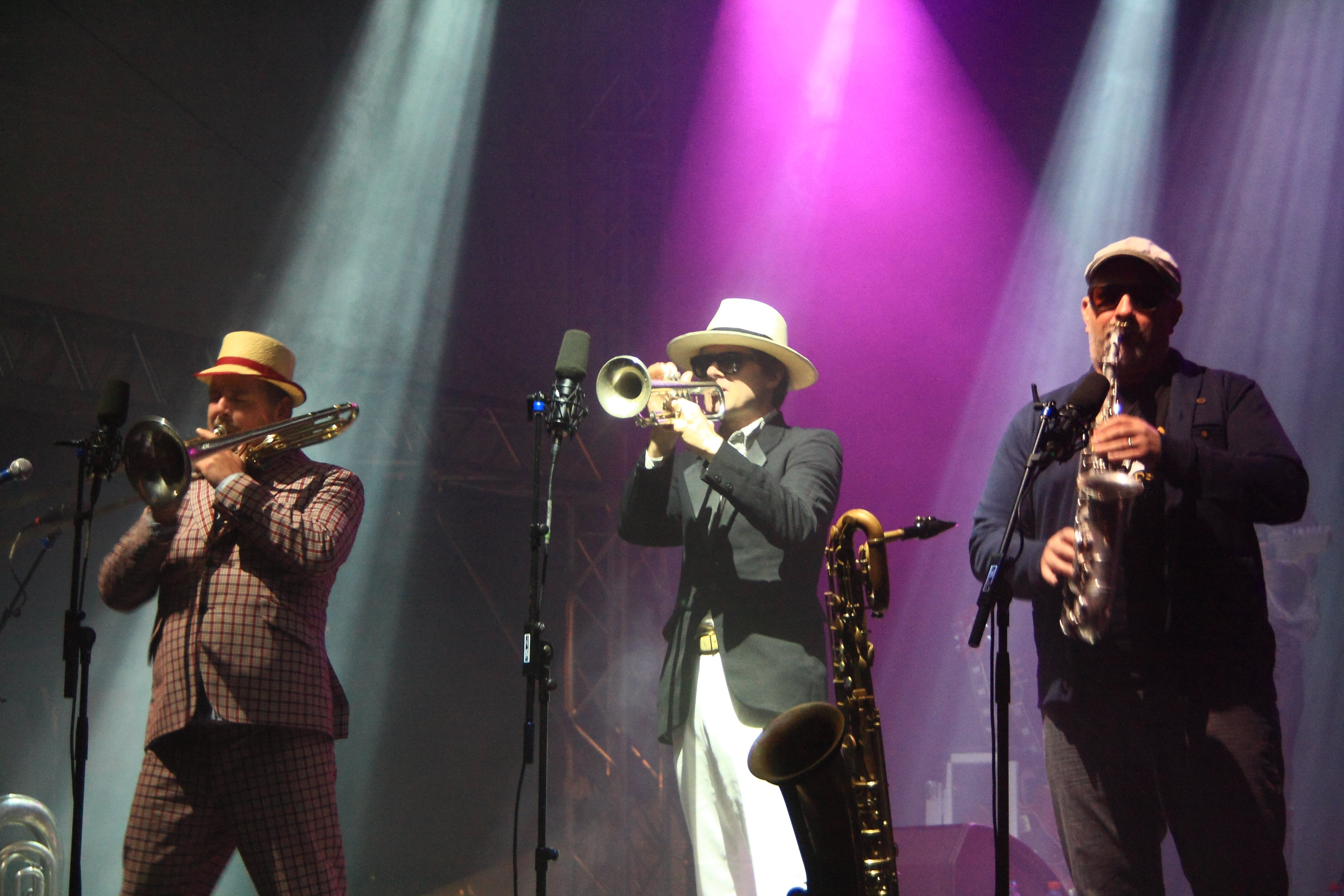
Hopepa, Tony Chang & Chopper Reedz

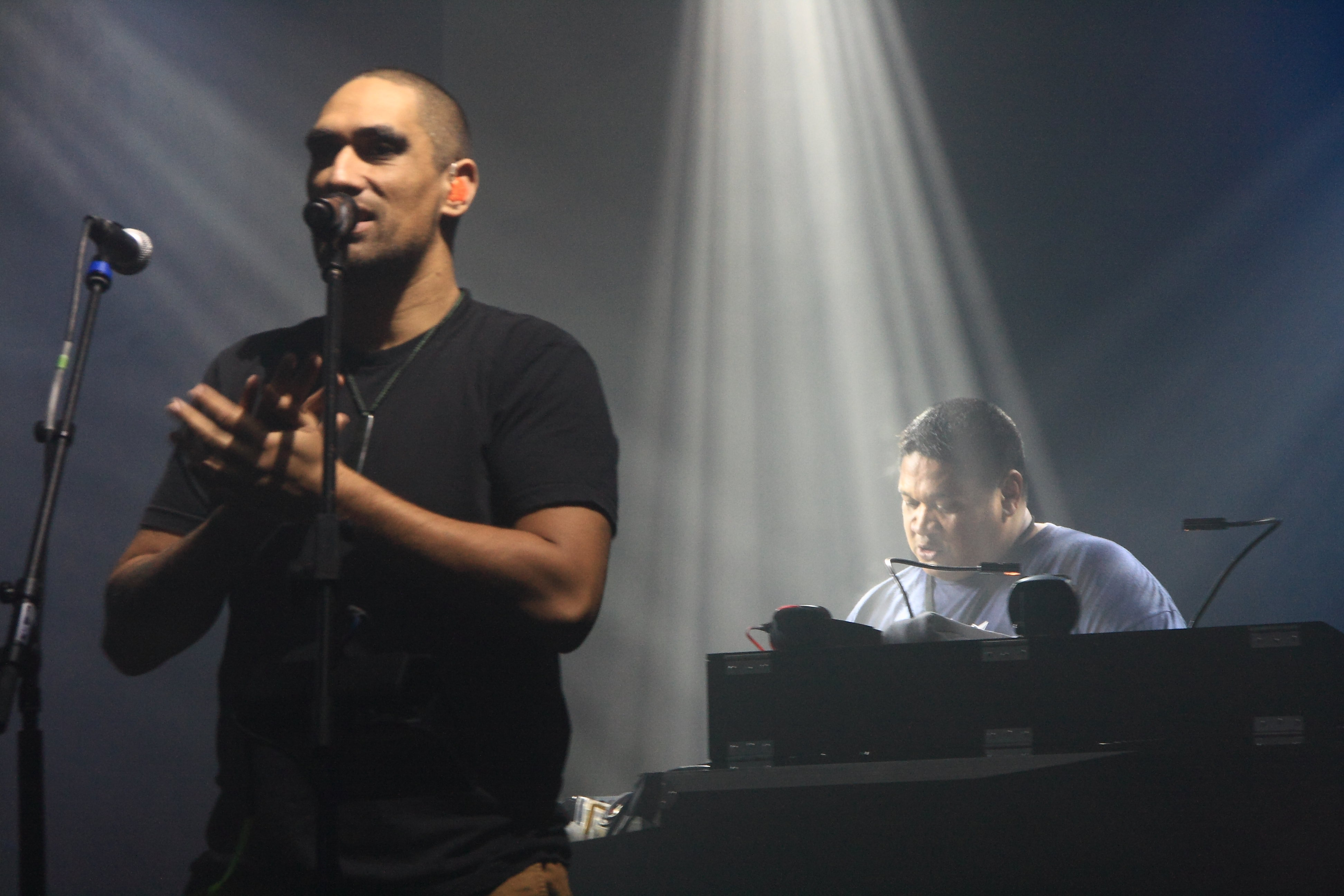
Joe Dukie & DJ Fitchie

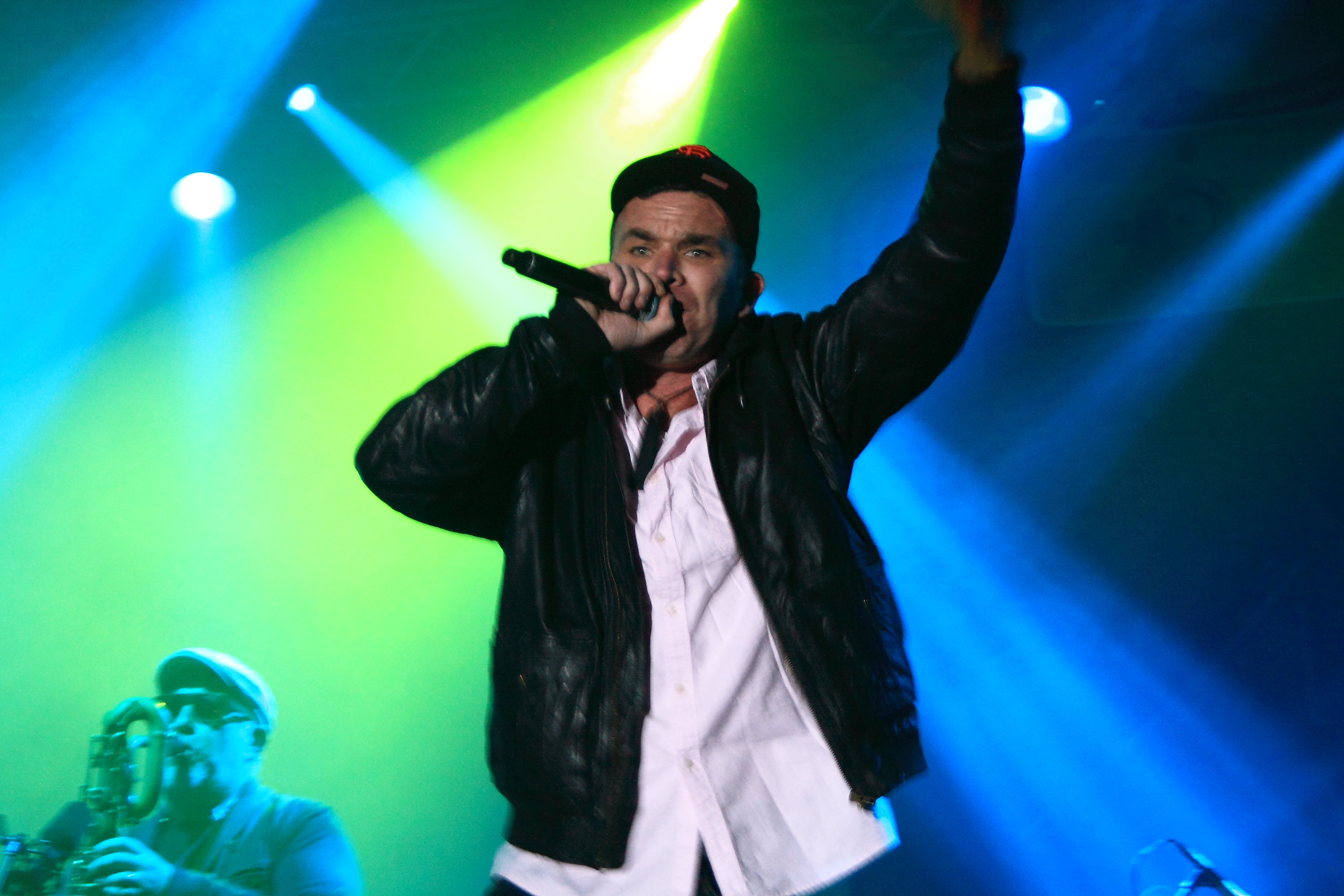
MC Slave, the "8th Freddy"

== Discography ==
Studio albums

- Based on a True Story (2005)
- Dr Boondigga and the Big BW (2009)
- Blackbird (2013)
- Bays (2015)
- Special Edition Part 1 (2019)
- LOCK-IN (2020)
- WAIRUNGA (2021)
- SLO MO (2024)

== Awards ==
RIANZ New Zealand Music Awards
Year	Award	Details	Result
2005	Album of the Year	Based on a True Story	Won
2005	Best Group		Won
2005	Best Aotearoa Roots Album	Based on a True Story	Won
2005	People's Choice Award		Won
2006	Highest Selling NZ Album	Based on a True Story	Won
2006	People's Choice Award		Won
2009	Album of the Year	Dr Boondigga and the Big BW	Nominated
2009	Best Group		Nominated
2009	Peoples' Choice Award		Nominated
2009	Best Aotearoa Roots Album	Dr Boondigga and the Big BW	Won
2009	Best Album Cover	Otis Frizzell: Dr Boondigga and the Big BW	Nominated
2009	Best Engineer	Chris Faiumu: Dr Boondigga and the Big BW	Nominated
2009	Best Producer	Fat Freddy's Drop: Dr Boondigga and the Big BW	Nominated

Vodafone New Zealand Music Awards
Year	Award	Details	Result
2013	Album of the Year	Blackbird	Nominated
2013	Best Group		Nominated
2013	Best Producer	FFD - Blackbird	Nominated
2013	Best Aotearoa Roots Album	Blackbird	Won
2013	Best Album Cover	Gina Kiel & Harry A'Court - Blackbird	Won
2014	Highest-selling NZ Album (top 5)	Blackbird-Deluxe Edition	Nominated
2016	Album of the Year	BAYS	Nominated
2016	Best Group		Nominated
2016	Highest-selling NZ Album (top 5)	BAYS	Nominated
2016	Best Aotearoa Roots Album	BAYS	Nominated
2016	International Achievement Award		Won
