= Wandering Eye =

Single by Fat Freddy's Drop

from the album Based on a True Story
- Released: 12 December 2005
- Genre: Electro, reggae
- Length: 5:05 (radio edit); 9:49 (album version)
- Songwriters: Maxwell, Tamaira, Faiumu, Laing, Kerr, Gordon

Audio sample
- file; help

"Wandering Eye" is a single released from the band Fat Freddy's Drop in 2005. It was their first publicly released single and had an excellent response from the public. This song features a multitude of instruments such as the trumpet, saxophone, guitar, vocals and a synthesizer.

== Music video ==
The accompanying video clip for "Wandering Eye" is set in a local fish and chips store, where the band provides the locals with a meal. While they are serving the customers and cooking the meals they are singing the song. Later on, when it is time to close, the band go downstairs to perform a concert for the customers. The video features cameos from John Campbell, Carol Hirschfeld, Ladi6, and Danielle Cormack and is directed and created by Mark Williams. The music video won the New Zealand Music "Tui" Award for Best Music Video.

== Chart performance ==
The song debuted on the New Zealand Singles Chart at number 31, and peaked at number 6. It left the chart after 17 weeks. It achieved gold sales by 17 October 2010.

== Track listing ==
Wandering Eye (EP)
No.	Title	Length
1.	"Wandering Eye" (Radio Edit)	5:05
2.	"Wandering Eye" (Submariner Remix)	6:26
3.	"Wandering Eye" (Fitchie's Instrumental)	8:01
4.	"Wandering Eye" (Live Italia Reprise)	3:30

== Certifications ==
Certifications and sales for "Wandering Eye"
Region	Certification	Certified units/sales
New Zealand (RMNZ)	9× Platinum	270,000^{‡}
^{‡} Sales+streaming figures based on certification alone.
