= Planet E Communications =

- Founded: 1991
- Founder: Carl Craig
- Distributor: !K7
- Genre: Electronic; techno; experimental
- Country of origin: United States
- Location: Detroit, Michigan
- Official website: www.planet-e.net

Planet E Communications is an independent electronic music recording label that started in 1991 in Detroit, Michigan. The label was founded by DJ/Producer Carl Craig, who was mentored under Derrick May leading up to the creation of Planet E.

== History ==
Planet E's first release was titled "4 Jazz Funk Classics," which Craig recorded under the moniker 69. Initial releases on Planet E would mainly be Craig's projects under a multitude of monikers, but would later evolve into being home to a myriad of electronic music's most influential artists such as Kevin Saunderson, Moodymann, Kenny Larkin, and Recloose. In 2001, Planet E celebrated its 10-year anniversary with a celebration at the Detroit Electronic Music Festival. Planet E is continually developing a roster, with producers such as Martin Buttrich, Jona, Ican, Glimpse and more.

In addition, Planet E has a subsidiary label, Community Projects. Craig developed this label to present music of other genres, everything from afro blues to space jazz to world music.

== Impact ==
Carl Craig wanted to create Planet E as his own independent project, as he wanted to create a sound that he uniquely liked. Similar to Community Projects, the work he created and collaborated on showcased a wide variety of music genres, taking inspiration from other notable names in Detroit, such as The Electrifying Mojo. Craig went on to explain his work behind Planet E as a "revolt" against a repetitive pattern he discovered within the Techo industry. As he developed as an artist under May, he craved to create a sound that nobody could judge but himself. In an interview conducted by the magazine Future Music, when Craig was asked about Planet E and adjusting to the evolution of the music industry, he said that he did not have a large budget for projects, but viewed his work as "guerrilla warfare and doing remixes to stay in business."

== Discography ==
- **69** - **4 Jazz Funk Classics**
- Various - A.R.T. Compilation
- **Piece - Free Your Mind**
- Florence / Wladimir M - Eevolute
- Various - Intergalactic Beats
- **Shop / Innerzone Orchestra - Untitled**
- **69 - Sound On Sound**
- Quadrant - Infinition
- Connection Machine - Bitflower
- **Paperclip People - Throw / Remake (Basic Reshape)**
- **Various - Elements Of And Experiments With Sound**
- Flexitone - Nausicaä
- **69 - Lite Music**
- Clark - Lofthouse
- Flexitone - Rotoreliefs EP
- Gemini - A Moment Of Insanity
- 4th Wave - Touched
- **Designer Music - Remix Vol. 1**
- Fusion - Never Forget It
- **Paperclip People - The Secret Tapes Of Dr. Eich**
- **Psyche / BFC - Elements 1989-1990**
- **Innerzone Orchestra - Bug In The Bass Bin**
- **Piece - Free Your Mind [Past] / Free Your Soul [Future]**
- **Paperclip People - Floor**
- **Paperclip People - Steam**
- **Carl Craig - More Songs About Food And Revolutionary Art**
- Moodymann - Dem Young Sconies / Bosconi
- Moodymann - Silentintroduction
- Kevin Saunderson - Faces & Phases - The Saunderson Collection
- Chaz Vincent - Dream Zenith
- Recloose - So This Is The Dining Room
- Common Factor - Common Factor EP
- Moodymann - Sunday Morning
- **Paperclip People - 4 My Peepz**
- E-Dancer - Heavenly
- Common Factor - Expanded EP
- Alton Miller - EP
- Common Factor - Dreams Of Elsewhere
- Jason Hogans - Peter And The Rooster EP
- **Various - Intergalactic Beats**
- **Paperclip People - 4 My Peepz**
- Jason Hogans - Peter And The Rooster EP
- Common Factor - Pisces Groove
- **Innerzone Orchestra - Programmed**
- Recloose - Spelunking EP
- **Paperclip People - Throw / Remake (Basic Reshape)**
- **Various Geology - A Subjective History Of Planet E - Volume One**
- **Innerzone Orchestra Featuring Paul Randolph - People Make The World Go Round**
- Recloose - Can't Take It
- Common Factor + John Redmond - Fascination / World Is Mine
- **Innerzone Orchestra - People Make The World Go Round 2**
- Agent-X - In The Morning EP
- **Designer Music - Problemz / The Truth**
- **Carl Craig - Designer Music V1**
- Ibex - Oasis
- Recloose - Can't Take It (Remixes)
- **Various - Geology - A Subjective Study Of Planet E - Volume Two**
- Ibex - Macamba
- Various - 2000 Black: The Good Good
- **Carl Craig - The Climax**
- **Various - All Access To Detroit's Music Festivals**
- **Paperclip People - Clear And Present / Tweakityourself**
- Newworldaquarium - Tresspassers / NY
- Recloose - Ain't Changin'
- Recloose - Cardiology
- Todd Sines + Natacha Labelle - Overlap
- Todd Sines + Natacha Labelle - Overlap: C² Mixes
- **Carl Craig - A Wonderful Life / As Time Goes By**
- Urban Tribe - Covert Action / Low Berth
- Recloose - Cardiology
- **Detroit Experiment - The Detroit Experiment**
- Niko Marks - Chune / Truly Something
- **Tres Demented - Demented**
- **Designer Music - Good Girls**
- **Carl Craig - Just Another Day**
- **69 - Sound On Sound**
- **Paperclip People - Throw / The Climax**
- **Psyche - Elements / Neurotic Behavior**
- **69 - 4 Jazz Funk Classics**
- Naomi Daniel - Feel The Fire / Stars
- **Paperclip People 4 My Peeps**
- **Carl Craig - Sparkle / Home Entertainment**
- **Carl Craig - Darkness (Radioslave Re-edit)**
- **Carl Craig - The Album Formerly Known As...**
- **Carl Craig - Darkness / Angel**
- **69 - Pungtang**
- **Tres Demented - Shez Satan**
- Ican - A Quien
- Martin Buttrich - Full Clip / Programmer
- Vince Watson - Renaissance / Rendezvous
- **Carl Craig - From The Vault: Planet E Classics Collection Vol. 1**
- **Carl Craig - Just Another Day**
- Lazy Fat People - Pixelgirl EP
- **Carl Craig - Paris Live**
- Kevin Saunderson - History Elevate 1
- Attias - Analysis
- Tribe - Livin' In A New Day
- Kevin Saunderson - History Elevate 2
- Sebastien San - Rising Sun
- Tribes - Vibes From The Tribe
- Martin Buttrich - Stoned Autopilot
- Jona - Altiplano
- Kenny Larkin - You Are...
- Ican - Pa' Mi Gente / Chiclet's Theme
- Kenny Larkin - Keys, Strings, Tambourines
- Waajeed - Mother EP
- Waajeed - Detroit Love

Note: Items in bold are Carl Craig productions or releases containing music by Carl Craig.
