= The Invisible =

The Invisible may refer to:

- The Invisible (2002 film), a Swedish thriller film by Joel Bergvall and Simon Sandquist based on Mats Wahl’s YA novel
- The Invisible (2007 film), a Swedish-American thriller film based on the book and the 2002 film
  - The Invisible (soundtrack)
- The Invisible (2020 film), a Spanish film
- The Invisible (band), a British band
  - The Invisible (album), their debut album
