= Likes... =

2004 studio album by Dani Siciliano

Studio album by Dani Siciliano
- Released: July 27, 2004
- Genre: Electronica
- Label: !K7
- Producer: Dani Siciliano, Matt Herbert

Dani Siciliano chronology
Likes... (2004)	Slappers (2006)

Likes... is the first solo album by Dani Siciliano. The album was released by !K7 records in 2004 and was recorded and produced by Siciliano in her home-studio with additional production from her husband Matt Herbert. It contains a cover of the Nirvana song "Come as You Are". It debuted at number 28 on CMJs airplay chart.

== Overview ==
Siciliano wrote, arranged, produced and engineered the original tracks herself in a small home studio then worked with Matt Herbert and others in his more sophisticated studio for additional production work. Many of the sounds, including a typewriter and banging the inside of a French horn, on the album were pre-recorded from as far back as 1979.

== Music ==
Siciliano recorded a "slowed-down, jazzy cover version" of Nirvana's "Come as You Are". Siciliano wanted to give the song the feel of a jazz standard. includes a sample of the "crick-crick of a lighter" The track includes a chorus of French horns and has been described as an "insanely unfaithful rendering" of the Nirvana classic.

She performs a duet with Mugison, "All Thee Above" that includes accordion by Doctor Rockit. Siciliano also plays clarinet on the track "Red". The track "One String" incorporates the sound of the plucking of one guitar string sampled and cut in many different ways to create a full sound.

== Cover art and title ==
Siciliano commissioned a San Francisco-based artist, John Patrick McKenzie, to do the album's artwork. McKenzie, who is autistic, has a specific speech pattern. He starts phrases with "so-and-so likes" or "so-and-so dislikes", so when discussing her ideas for the album cover he would repeatedly say "Dani Siciliano likes...", and this became the album's title.

== Reception ==
Professional ratings
Review scores
Source	Rating
Allmusic	3.5/5 stars

Siciliano's debut solo release was received well by most reviewers. Jon Pareles of The New York Times wrote that the "songs are about desire and estrangement" comparing them to "cabaret chansons". He noted her voice was only "modest in range and expressiveness" and closed by opining that the music "opens the door into its sonic reveries". Joe Muggs, in his review for The Daily Telegraph, wrote that the "sonic palette here is incredible". He called the album "ancient...modern...relaxing...attitude-filled...dreamy...[and] exciting".

In The Guardian John L. Walters listed Siciliano's strengths as having "a jazz-inflected voice; quirky songwriting; [and] hard-nosed pop instincts" and that the album "is a good selection for listeners who are bored waiting for the next Bebel Gilberto or Björk album to come along". Justin Kleinfeld of CMJ New Music Report wrote that the album was "full of risks and inventions" and that she "stepped out of Matthew Herbert's shadow, and is starting to cast a rather large one of her own". Andy Kellman of Allmusic wrote that her lyrics aren't "particularly compelling" but that her voice "falls into the dreamy productions as an instrument that adds another shade".

== Track listing ==
All tracks written by Dani Siciliano unless noted.

1. "Same" 9:13
2. "Come as You Are" (Kurt Cobain, Dave Grohl, Krist Novoselic) 5:11
3. "Canes and Trains" 1:17
4. "Walk the Line" (Gabriel Olegavich, Siciliano) 3:46
5. "One String" 2:03
6. "All Thee Above" (Ornelias Mugison, Siciliano) 5:19
7. "Extra Ordinary" (Matt Herbert, Siciliano) 4:51
8. "She Say Cliche" (Herbert, Siciliano) 2:46
9. "Red" (Robert Fripp, Siciliano) 4:04
10. "Collaboration (Ready)" 4:39
11. "Remember to Forget" 4:07

== Personnel ==
- Dani Siciliano – arranger, clarinet, engineer, producer, vocals
- Matthew Herbert – accordion, producer, voices
- Bill Brewer – French horn
- Chris Cole – trombone
- Andrew Cook – trumpet
- Jennifer George – flute
- Rebecca Gibson – clarinet
- David Green – bass
- Nigel Hitchcock – clarinet
- Adam Linsley – trumpet
- Robert McKay – bass clarinet
- Mugison – engineer, guitar, vocals
- David O'Higgins – flute
- Gabriel Olegavich – arranger, engineer, French horn, string arrangements
- Richard Pardy – clarinet
- Martin Williams – clarinet
- Benedicte Toft – design
- Paul Crichton – engineer
- Max de Wardener – arranger, bass, engineer, producer

== Chart history ==
Album charts
Year	Source	Peak
2004	CMJ	28
