= Avengers: Age of Ultron =

2015 Marvel Studios film

- Theatrical release poster
- Directed by: Joss Whedon
- Written by: Joss Whedon
- Based on: Avengers by: Stan Lee; Jack Kirby
- Produced by: Kevin Feige
- Starring: Robert Downey Jr.; Chris Hemsworth; Mark Ruffalo; Chris Evans; Scarlett Johansson; Jeremy Renner; Don Cheadle; Aaron Taylor-Johnson; Elizabeth Olsen; Paul Bettany; Cobie Smulders; Anthony Mackie; Hayley Atwell; Idris Elba; Linda Cardellini; Stellan Skarsgård; James Spader; Samuel L. Jackson
- Cinematography: Ben Davis
- Edited by: Jeffrey Ford; Lisa Lassek
- Music by: Brian Tyler; Danny Elfman
- Production company: Marvel Studios
- Distributed by: Walt Disney Studios Motion Pictures
- Release dates: April 13, 2015 (Dolby Theatre); May 1, 2015 (United States)
- Running time: 141 minutes
- Country: United States
- Language: English
- Budget: $444–495.2 million (gross); $365 million (net)
- Box office: $1.405 billion

Avengers: Age of Ultron is a 2015 American superhero film based on the Marvel Comics superhero team the Avengers. Produced by Marvel Studios and distributed by Walt Disney Studios Motion Pictures, it is the sequel to The Avengers (2012) and the 11th film in the Marvel Cinematic Universe (MCU). Written and directed by Joss Whedon, the film features an ensemble cast including Robert Downey Jr., Chris Hemsworth, Mark Ruffalo, Chris Evans, Scarlett Johansson, Jeremy Renner, Don Cheadle, Aaron Taylor-Johnson, Elizabeth Olsen, Paul Bettany, Cobie Smulders, Anthony Mackie, Hayley Atwell, Idris Elba, Linda Cardellini, Stellan Skarsgård, James Spader, and Samuel L. Jackson. In the film, the Avengers fight Ultron (Spader)—an artificial intelligence created by Tony Stark (Downey) and Bruce Banner (Ruffalo)—who plans to bring about world peace by causing human extinction.

A sequel was announced in May 2012 after the successful release of The Avengers, with Whedon set to return as writer and director in August. He updated Ultron's origin for the film to involve the MCU's Avengers team and introduced the characters Pietro (Taylor-Johnson) and Wanda Maximoff (Olsen), to whom Marvel shared the rights with 20th Century Fox. Casting began in June 2013 with Downey re-signing. Second unit filming began in February 2014 in South Africa, with principal photography taking place between March and August, primarily at Shepperton Studios in Surrey, England. Additional footage was filmed in Italy, South Korea, Bangladesh, the state of New York, and around England. With an estimated net production budget of $365 million, the film is one of the most expensive ever made.

Avengers: Age of Ultron premiered in Hollywood, Los Angeles, on April 13, 2015, and was released in the United States on May 1, as part of Phase Two of the MCU. The film received generally positive reviews from critics and grossed over $1.4 billion worldwide, becoming the fourth-highest-grossing film of 2015 and the fifth-highest-grossing film of all time during its run. Two sequels have been released: Avengers: Infinity War (2018) and Avengers: Endgame (2019).

== Plot ==
In the Eastern European country of Sokovia, the Avengers—Tony Stark, Thor, Bruce Banner, Steve Rogers, Natasha Romanoff, and Clint Barton—raid a Hydra facility commanded by Baron Wolfgang von Strucker, who has experimented on humans using the scepter previously wielded by Loki. They are attacked by two of Strucker's test subjects, twins who have been given superhuman abilities: Pietro (superspeed) and Wanda Maximoff (telepathy and telekinesis). The Avengers apprehend Strucker and retrieve Loki's scepter.

Stark and Banner discover an artificial intelligence (AI) within the scepter's gem and secretly use it to complete Stark's "Ultron" global defense program. The unexpectedly sentient Ultron, believing he must eradicate humanity to save Earth, eliminates Stark's AI J.A.R.V.I.S. and attacks the Avengers at their headquarters. Escaping with the scepter, Ultron uses the resources in Strucker's Sokovia base to upgrade his rudimentary body and build an army of robot drones. He kills Strucker and recruits the Maximoffs, who hold Stark responsible for the deaths of their parents by his company's weapons. The trio go to the base of arms dealer Ulysses Klaue in Johannesburg to get vibranium. The Avengers attack them there and are subdued by haunting visions created by Wanda. Banner turns into the Hulk and rampages through Johannesburg until Stark stops him with his anti-Hulk armor. (Note: The name of the anti-Hulk armor, usually referred to as the "Hulkbuster" in comic books, is not spoken in the film. Its deployment system and containment cell are code-named "Veronica", which director Joss Whedon said alludes to the character Veronica Lodge from Archie Comics: "I just decided to call it Veronica because [Bruce Banner] used to be in love with a girl named Betty and Veronica is the opposite of that," making the connection to Archie's love interest Betty Cooper.)

A worldwide backlash over the Hulk's destruction, and the fears Wanda's hallucinations incited, send the team into hiding at Barton's farmhouse with his family. Thor departs to consult with Dr. Erik Selvig on the apocalyptic future he saw in his hallucination, while Nick Fury arrives and encourages the team to form a plan to stop Ultron. In Seoul, Ultron uses Loki's scepter to enslave the team's friend Helen Cho. They use her synthetic-tissue technology, vibranium, and the scepter's gem to craft a new body. As Ultron uploads himself into it, Wanda reads his mind and discovers his plan for human extinction; the Maximoffs turn against Ultron. Rogers, Romanoff, and Barton fight Ultron and retrieve the synthetic body, but Ultron captures Romanoff. Stark and Banner upload J.A.R.V.I.S., who has been secretly active inside the Internet to hide from Ultron, into the synthetic body.

The Avengers fight among themselves over the decision to upload J.A.R.V.I.S. until Thor returns and helps activate the body. He explains that the scepter's gem is part of his vision, related to the powerful six Infinity Stones, from which the new being gets the name "Vision". He earns their trust by being worthy of lifting Thor's hammer, Mjölnir. Vision and the Maximoffs go with the Avengers to Sokovia, where Ultron has used the remaining vibranium to build a machine to lift a large part of the capital city into the sky, intending to crash it into the ground to cause global extinction. Banner rescues Romanoff, who awakens the Hulk for the battle. The Avengers fight Ultron's army while Fury arrives in a Helicarrier with Maria Hill, James Rhodes, and S.H.I.E.L.D. agents to evacuate civilians.

Pietro dies when he shields Barton from gunfire, and a vengeful Wanda abandons her post to destroy Ultron's primary body. This allows one of his drones to activate the machine, causing the city to plummet. Stark and Thor overload the machine and shatter the landmass. The Hulk, unwilling to endanger Romanoff by being with her, departs in a Quinjet. Vision confronts and destroys Ultron's last remaining drone. After the Avengers establish a new base, Thor returns to Asgard to learn more about his vision. As Stark leaves and Barton retires, Rogers and Romanoff prepare to train new Avengers: Rhodes, Vision, Sam Wilson, and Wanda.

In a mid-credits scene, Thanos dons a metallic gauntlet (Note: The Infinity Gauntlet seen at the end of the film is not the same as the one seen in Odin's vault in Asgard in Thor (2011). The Asgard Gauntlet is revealed to be a fake in Thor: Ragnarok (2017), and the one in Age of Ultron was later explained as a "fashionable practice gauntlet".) and vows to retrieve the Infinity Stones himself.

== Cast ==
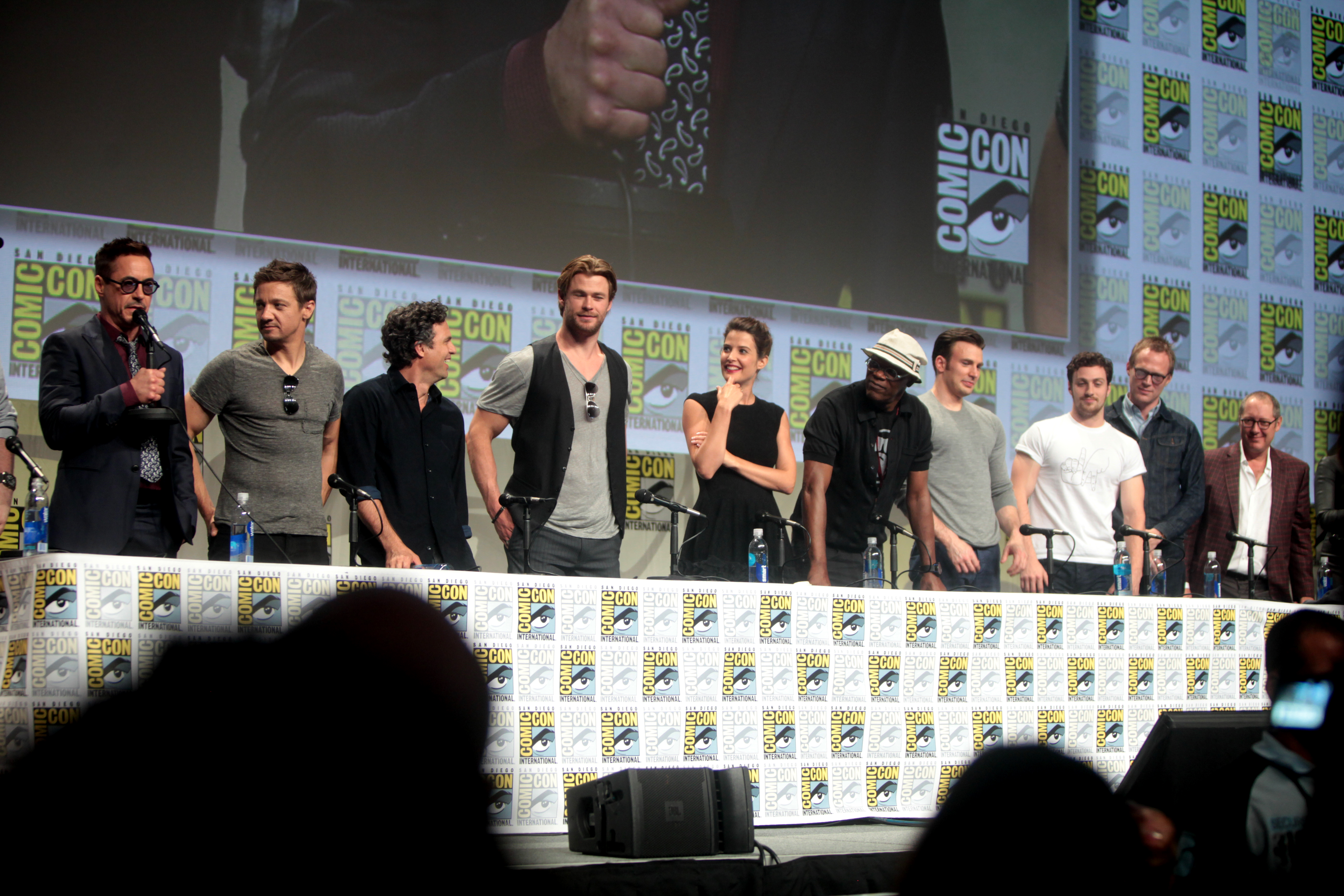
The cast of Avengers: Age of Ultron at the 2014 San Diego Comic-Con

- Robert Downey Jr. as Tony Stark / Iron Man:
  The benefactor of the Avengers who is a self-described genius, billionaire, playboy, and philanthropist with electromechanical suits of armor of his own invention. On how his character evolves after the events of Iron Man 3 (2013), Downey said, "I think he realizes that tweaking and making all the suits in the world—which is what he has been doing—still didn't work for that thing of his tour of duty that left him a little PTSD. So his focus is more on how can we make it so that there's no problem to begin with. That, you know, there's a bouncer at our planet's rope. That's the big idea."
- Chris Hemsworth as Thor:
  An Avenger and the crown prince of Asgard, based on the Norse mythological deity of the same name. Regarding Thor's place in the film, Hemsworth stated that as Thor has remained on Earth since Thor: The Dark World (2013), and has begun to feel at home here, he considers Ultron's threat a personal attack. Hemsworth stated that he had to work harder to bring new elements to the character to avoid repeating himself saying, "It gave us room to kind of make him a little more grounded and human and have him in some civilian clothes and mixing it up at a party." Hemsworth noted that Thor's motivations in this film were completely different, as it was the first MCU film where he did not play against Tom Hiddleston's character of Loki.
- Mark Ruffalo as Bruce Banner / Hulk:
  An Avenger and genius scientist who, because of exposure to gamma radiation, transforms into a monster when enraged or agitated. To prepare for the role, Ruffalo worked with motion capture performer Andy Serkis' The Imaginarium. He stated that his character had grown since the previous film and was "a bit more complex". Ruffalo explained that a confrontation is brewing between Banner and the Hulk saying, "There's a very cool thing happening: Hulk is as afraid of Banner as Banner is afraid of Hulk.. and they have got to come to peace somehow with each other." While filming in London, Ruffalo said that Whedon still had not given him any of the Hulk's lines. Whedon later explained that he writes the Hulk's dialogue spontaneously, saying, "What makes the Hulk so hard to write is that you're pretending he's a werewolf when he's a superhero. You want it vice versa [...] So the question is, how has he progressed? How can we bring changes on what the Hulk does? And that's not just in the screenplay, that's moment to moment."
- Chris Evans as Steve Rogers / Captain America:
  The leader of the Avengers and a World War II veteran who was enhanced to the peak of human physicality by an experimental serum and frozen in suspended animation before waking up in the modern world. Evans stated that since the fall of S.H.I.E.L.D. in Captain America: The Winter Soldier (2014), Rogers has been left to depend on his Avenger teammates without the structure of military life and is now "looking to understand where he belongs, not just as a soldier, as Captain America, but as Steve Rogers, as a person." Evans maintained his physique from Captain America: The Winter Soldier by working out up to an hour a day. Regarding Captain America's fighting style, Evans felt he did not want to take a step back from the skills shown in The Winter Soldier, making sure Rogers' fight style advanced, showing "a consistent display of strength", and having Rogers utilizing his environment.
- Scarlett Johansson as Natasha Romanoff / Black Widow:
  An Avenger who formerly worked for S.H.I.E.L.D. as a highly trained spy. Producer Kevin Feige stated that more of the character's backstory is explored in the film. Johansson elaborated, "In Avengers 2 we go back [...] we definitely learn more about Widow's backstory, and we get to find out how she became the person you see. All of these characters have deep, dark pasts, and I think that the past catches up to some of us a little bit." Regarding where the film picks up Widow's story, Johansson felt it was a continuation of what was seen for her character in The Winter Soldier, with the fact that "'[Widow] never made an active choice. [She's] a product of other people's imposition.' That's going to catch up with her. That's bound to have a huge effect. There's got to be a result of that realization [...] You'll see her actively making some choices in her life, for better or worse." A mixture of close-ups, concealing costumes, stunt doubles, and visual effects were used to help hide Johansson's pregnancy during filming.
- Jeremy Renner as Clint Barton / Hawkeye:
  An Avenger and master archer who previously worked as an agent for S.H.I.E.L.D. Whedon said that Hawkeye interacts more with the other characters in the film, as opposed to the first film where the character had been "possessed pretty early by a bad guy and had to walk around all scowly." As the character did not appear in any other of Marvel's Phase Two films, Whedon stated Age of Ultron sheds light on to what the character was doing since the end of The Avengers. Renner described the character as "kind of a loner" and "a team player only 'cause he sort of has to be. He's not really a company man. Captain America can be that guy. In [Age of Ultron] you'll understand why [Hawkeye] thinks the way he thinks."
- Don Cheadle as James "Rhodey" Rhodes / War Machine: An officer in the U.S. Air Force, later Avenger and Tony Stark's close personal friend who operates the War Machine armor.
- Aaron Taylor-Johnson as Pietro Maximoff:
  The twin brother of Wanda and Avenger who can move at superhuman speed. Taylor-Johnson felt Pietro was defined by the fact that he and his sister were abandoned by their family, and they both had to grow up "in Eastern Europe defending and looking out for themselves and each other," that they both look to the other for guidance. Taylor-Johnson also said that Quicksilver was "very overprotective" of Scarlet Witch and has "real anger frustration", which results in him being easily bored because of a short attention span. Feige stated exploring Quicksilver's relationship with his sister and his backstory growing up in Eastern Europe would help differentiate the character from Evan Peters' version in X-Men: Days of Future Past (2014). Taylor-Johnson stated that the running style for Quicksilver went through multiple iterations. Much of Taylor-Johnson's scenes were filmed outdoors to give "life" to his running, as opposed to running indoors in front of a green screen.
- Elizabeth Olsen as Wanda Maximoff:
  The twin sister of Pietro and Avenger who can engage in hypnosis and telekinesis. Olsen felt Wanda was "overly stimulated" rather than "mentally insane" because "she has such a vast amount of knowledge that she's unable to learn how to control it. No one taught her how to control it properly [...] she can connect to this world and parallel worlds at the same time, and parallel times." Describing her character's mind control powers, Olsen said that the character is able to do more than manipulating someone's mind, with Wanda Maximoff able to "feel and see what they feel and see" by projecting visions that they have never seen. Olsen drew on her relationship with her older brother and her sisters to prepare for the role, as well as looking to the comics for inspiration. Olsen revealed that Whedon was inspired by dancers as a way to visually represent how the character moves. As such, Olsen mostly trained with a dancer in lieu of traditional stunt training. Olsen was signed for this film and another.
- Paul Bettany as J.A.R.V.I.S. and Vision:
  Bettany, who voiced J.A.R.V.I.S., Stark's AI companion in previous films, was cast again as the Vision, an android and later Avenger created by Ultron. Bettany stated that he was surprised when Whedon asked him if he wanted to be the Vision because once an actor has been cast as a particular character in the MCU, they usually are not cast as another. On what intrigued him about the Vision, Bettany said, "The thing that appealed to me is that this sort of nascent creature being born, being both omnipotent and totally naive, the sort of danger of that and complex nature of a thing being born that is that powerful and that created in a second and the choices he makes morally are really complex and interesting. They've really managed to maintain all of that". Bettany also stated that the Vision feels paternal and protective to a number of people in the film, particularly Scarlet Witch, and has the ability to change his density. Bettany did wire work for the part. Whedon stated he wanted to include the Vision in a second Avengers film before he signed onto the first film. Bettany's make-up, which consisted of a mix of face paint and prosthetics, took two hours to apply with make-up artists Jeremy Woodhead and Nik Williams citing the correct hue of the Vision's skin as the hardest thing to figure out. The prosthetics were ultimately replaced in post-production with CGI elements.
- Cobie Smulders as Maria Hill:
  A former high-ranking S.H.I.E.L.D. agent who now works for Stark. Describing Hill's situation in the film, Smulders said that after The Winter Soldier, Hill does not "really know who's a good guy and who's a bad guy and she's trying to figure out that throughout this film." She added, "She's not getting any sleep. She's doing all the work. She doesn't have the kind of manpower that she had in S.H.I.E.L.D.," instead working for Tony Stark at the Avenger's headquarters "trying to keep everything running as smoothly as possible [...] it's an entirely different vibe for her."
- Anthony Mackie as Sam Wilson / Falcon:
  A former pararescueman and later Avenger trained by the military in aerial combat using a specially designed wing pack and a friend of Steve Rogers. Discussing the relationship between Wilson and Rogers, Mackie said that the two characters have a mutual "soldier respect", which is explored in the film and in Captain America: Civil War (2016). Feige said that it was decided to reshoot the final scene of the film to incorporate the new Falcon suit designed for Ant-Man (2015), which was released after Age of Ultron, as Falcon was originally shot in his original suit from The Winter Soldier. Mackie stated he did not realize Wilson had become an Avenger until he watched the film at the premiere, as he was only given the script for the scenes he worked on.
- Hayley Atwell as Peggy Carter: A retired officer with the Strategic Scientific Reserve and co-founder of S.H.I.E.L.D. who is a former love interest of Steve Rogers.
- Idris Elba as Heimdall: The all-seeing, all-hearing Asgardian sentry of the Bifröst Bridge, based on the mythological deity of the same name.
- Linda Cardellini as Laura Barton: Hawkeye's wife.
- Stellan Skarsgård as Erik Selvig:
  An astrophysicist and friend of Thor. Skarsgård said he was originally not supposed to appear in the film, but received a call because "they'd written a couple of scenes, and I went and did them," not knowing if the scenes would appear in the final cut of the film.
- James Spader as Ultron:
  An artificial intelligence repurposed by Tony Stark and Bruce Banner for a pilot peace program that is overwhelmed with a god complex and now desires to pacify the Earth by eradicating humanity. Director Joss Whedon stated that Spader was his "first and only choice" for the role, because of his "hypnotic voice that can be eerily calm and compelling" while also being very human and humorous. Feige clarified that Spader's face and body were motion captured "to create a whole performance [...] We did not hire James Spader to do a robot voice." Extensive scans were taken of Spader's head and body in preparation for the role. About the character Whedon said, "He's always trying to destroy the Avengers, goddamn it, he's got a bee in his bonnet. He's not a happy guy, which means he's an interesting guy. He's got pain. And the way that manifests is not going to be standard robot stuff." Whedon added that Ultron is "not a creature of logic—he's a robot who's genuinely disturbed. We're finding out what makes him menacing and at the same time endearing and funny and strange and unexpected, and everything a robot never is." Whedon compared Ultron to Frankenstein's monster, saying, "It's our new Frankenstein myth [...] We create something in our own image and the thing turns on us. It has that pain of 'Well, why was I made? I want to kill Daddy.'" Spader called the character "self-absorbed" and added, "I think he sees the Avengers as being part of a problem, a more comprehensive problem in the world. He sees the world from a very strange, [biblical] point of view because he's brand new, he's very young [...] He's immature, and yet has knowledge of comprehensive, broad history and precedent, and he has created in a very short period of time a rather skewed worldview." Spader elaborates, "He truly is an artificial intelligence with absolutely no censorship at all, no parameters really [...] he's got too much power, too much strength and speed and size, so he's a very dangerous child."
- Samuel L. Jackson as Nick Fury:
  The former director of S.H.I.E.L.D. who originally recruited the Avengers and continues to be a mentor and leader for the team. Jackson described the role as a cameo, saying the character didn't participate in the action scenes because "There's not a lot I could do except shoot a gun."

Thomas Kretschmann and Henry Goodman reprise their roles as Baron Wolfgang von Strucker and Dr. List, Hydra leaders who specialize in human experimentation, advanced robotics, and artificial intelligence from Captain America: The Winter Soldier. Claudia Kim portrays Helen Cho, a world-renowned geneticist who helps the Avengers from her office in Seoul; Andy Serkis portrays Ulysses Klaue, a South-African black-market arms dealer, smuggler and gangster who is a former acquaintance from Stark's weapons-dealing days; and Julie Delpy appears as Madame B., who mentored Black Widow into becoming an assassin. Kerry Condon voices the artificial intelligence F.R.I.D.A.Y., a replacement for J.A.R.V.I.S., while Spader also voices Stark's Iron Legion droids. Josh Brolin makes an uncredited appearance during the mid-credits scene as Thanos, reprising his role from Guardians of the Galaxy (2014). Avengers co-creator Stan Lee makes a cameo appearance in the film as a military veteran who attends the Avengers' victory party. Tom Hiddleston was to reprise his role of Loki, but his scenes did not make the theatrical cut of the film.

== Production ==
=== Development ===
"I have to make my movie assuming that people will only have seen the first one, or possibly not even seen the first one. I can't assume that everybody went to see Thor [The Dark World], Captain America [The Winter Soldier], and Iron Man [3] in-between. I have to go from one movie to the next and be true to what's happened, but not be slavish to it [...] The model I'm always trying to build from, my guiding star, is The Godfather Part II where a ton has happened in-between and it's a very different movie [from The Godfather], but you don't need any information: it's there in the film."

— Joss Whedon, director of Avengers: Age of Ultron, on balancing the film's accessibility and continuity.

In October 2011, Marvel Studios president Kevin Feige said the studio was beginning to look at the films that would comprise Phase Two of the studio's shared universe, the Marvel Cinematic Universe (MCU), which would start with Iron Man 3 and would culminate in a second Avengers film. In March 2012, Joss Whedon, director of the first film, stated that he would want a sequel to be more small, personal, and painful; that is "not just a rehash of what seemed to work the first time", and with a theme full of originality to itself. Despite the production of the film becoming increasingly wider in scope, Feige maintained that this was not their intention, always looking to see where the team wanted to take the characters, over how to make it bigger than The Avengers. At the premiere of The Avengers, Feige said the studio had an option for Whedon to return as director. In May 2012, after the successful release of the first film, the Walt Disney Company CEO Bob Iger announced a sequel was in development. Most of the film's cast members were under contract to potentially appear in the sequel; however, Tony Stark / Iron Man actor Robert Downey Jr. was not, as his four-picture deal with Marvel expired after Iron Man 3.

At the 2012 San Diego Comic-Con, Whedon said he was undecided about directing. However, in August 2012, Iger announced that Whedon would return to write and direct the sequel and develop the Marvel television series, Agents of S.H.I.E.L.D. (2013–2020), for ABC. Later in the month, Disney set a May 1, 2015, release date. Whedon said his return for a sequel "wasn't a tough decision"; he thought it was "not going to happen", but realized he "desperately wanted to say more about these characters" when he started considering it. Whedon said that they intended for the film's production to not be as rushed as the first one. In December 2012, Whedon stated that he had completed an outline for the film. In March 2013, Whedon said that he looked to the films The Empire Strikes Back (1980) and The Godfather Part II (1974) as inspirations.

Feige revealed that Captain Marvel, who starred in her own MCU film in 2019, appeared in an early draft of the screenplay, but was removed since the character had not yet been cast, saying, "It didn't feel like the time. We didn't want to introduce her fully formed flying in a costume before you knew who she was or how she came to be." Whedon went so far as to shoot visual effects plates for Captain Marvel to fly into Avengers Headquarters at the end of the film; those shots were reused; however, for Wanda Maximoff instead. Feige also revealed that an early draft of the script had Bruce Banner / Hulk's Quinjet detected near Saturn at the end of the film, but it was finally decided to keep it Earth-based and leave his fate ambiguous in order to dispel rumors that a film based on the "Planet Hulk" comic storyline was in development, which Marvel Studios had no plans to adapt at the time. Marvel would later decide to adapt "Planet Hulk" for the MCU film Thor: Ragnarok (2017), in which the Hulk is retroactively revealed to have left Earth after the events of Age of Ultron.

=== Pre-production ===
By April 2013, filming was scheduled to begin in early 2014 at Shepperton Studios in England. At the Hollywood, Los Angeles, premiere of Iron Man 3, Whedon said that he had completed a draft of the script, started the storyboard process, and met with actors. Whedon also mentioned that he wrote with Downey in mind and included a "brother/sister act" from the comic books, later confirming that he was referring to Pietro and Wanda Maximoff. Whedon explained his rationale for including the characters in the film that "their powers are very visually interesting", with problems which Whedon "had on the first one" for strong powers; those powers are superspeed, and spells and telekinesis, respectively, which "they can do that will help sort of keep it fresh", though cautioned he was not throwing in more characters for the sake of doing that. Whedon stated that the twins allowed him to add more conflict, who dislike the United States and the Avengers, and "the Avengers are like a world power, and not everybody's on board with the Avengers coming in and starting fights, even in the name of justice". Because Marvel Studios shared the film rights to Quicksilver and Scarlet Witch with 20th Century Fox and had to avoid conflict with Fox's X-Men films, Whedon introduced two important characters into the Marvel Cinematic Universe completely on his terms for the first time, which allowed him to connect their origin stories to the universe that they created and avoid the concept of mutants. Whedon relished at the storytelling opportunities by introducing a character with telepathic powers, explaining, "it meant we could spend a little time inside the Avengers' heads—either their past or their impressions of what's going on, or their fears, or all of the above." By May, Downey had entered negotiations to extend his contract with Marvel Studios and reprise his role as Iron Man in the film. A month later, Downey signed on to return for the then-untitled Avengers sequel, as well as a third Avengers film.

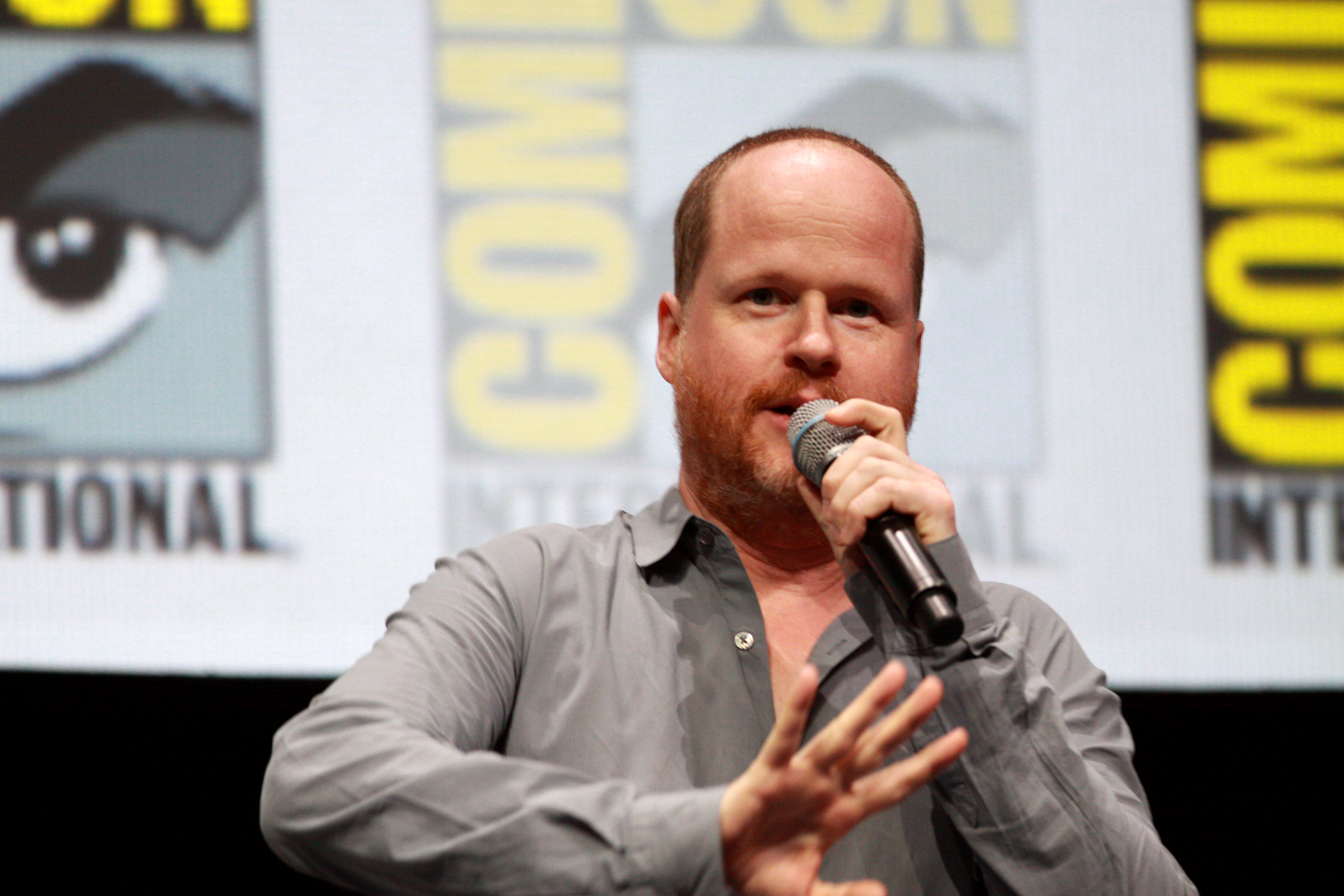
Whedon promoting the film at the 2013 San Diego Comic-Con

At the 2013 San Diego Comic-Con, Whedon announced the film would be subtitled Age of Ultron. Despite the subtitle, the film is not based on the 2013 comic book miniseries Age of Ultron. Feige explained that they simply liked the title Age of Ultron but the plot was taken from decades of Avengers story arcs. Whedon added that Ultron's origin would differ from his comics roots, and that Hank Pym would not be involved with Ultron's creation. Whedon disclosed that Edgar Wright had rights to the character first through his inclusion in Ant-Man, which was already in development. He also thought that Ultron needed to be conceived through the Avengers and since they already had Tony Stark and Bruce Banner on the team, it would not make sense to bring in a third scientist. Whedon also said the film would have a darker tone due to Ultron's involvement. The title of the film came as a surprise to many fans who were expecting Thanos, the mastermind behind the events of the first film, to be the main villain in the sequel, with Whedon saying, "Thanos was never meant to be the next villain. He's always been the overlord of villainy and darkness." Commenting on finding the right balance between technology- and fantasy-based heroes in Avengers: Age of Ultron, Feige explained that Iron Man is a technology-based hero, and his films are always based on those; Thor is a fantasy-based hero introduced in the 2011 film of the same name, which also introduces Asgard, a fantastical realm in "the more reality-based MCU"; and finally, Ultron is "clearly [...] come[s] out of technology," using tools that established in the franchise to construct Age of Ultron storyline.

Casting continued into August 2013, with the announcement that James Spader would play Ultron. In November, Marvel confirmed that Elizabeth Olsen and Aaron Taylor-Johnson would play Wanda and Pietro Maximoff, respectively. Taylor-Johnson had been in negotiations since as early as June, while Olsen's potential involvement was first reported in August. By the end of the year, Mark Ruffalo (who portrays Bruce Banner / Hulk in the MCU), Chris Evans (Steve Rogers / Captain America), Samuel L. Jackson (Nick Fury), Chris Hemsworth (Thor), Scarlett Johansson (Natasha Romanoff / Black Widow), Jeremy Renner (Clint Barton / Hawkeye), and Cobie Smulders (Maria Hill) were confirmed to be returning to their roles from the first film, and Don Cheadle, who portrayed James Rhodes / War Machine in the Iron Man films, had committed to a part in the film. In the early months of 2014, Thomas Kretschmann was cast as Baron Wolfgang von Strucker, Claudia Kim was cast in an unspecified role, and Paul Bettany, who voiced J.A.R.V.I.S. in previous MCU films, was cast as Vision. Whedon said "juggling" all the characters in the film was "a nightmare"; he explained: "They're very disparate characters. The joy of the Avengers is they really don't belong in the same room. It's not like the X-Men, who are all tortured by the same thing and have similar costumes. These guys are just all over the place. And so it's tough. Honestly, this is as tough as anything I've ever done."

On January 24, 2014, the Forte di Bard Association announced that filming would take place at Fort Bard in the Aosta Valley region of Italy in March 2014, as well as other locations in Aosta Valley including Aosta, Bard, Donnas, Pont-Saint-Martin, and Verrès. The next month, the Gauteng Film Commission announced that action sequences would be filmed in Johannesburg, South Africa, and other locations in Gauteng, beginning in mid-February. A few weeks later Marvel announced that portions of the film would be shot in South Korea. Feige cited the nation's "cutting-edge technology, beautiful landscapes and spectacular architecture" as ideal for the film. The nation's capital, Seoul, and Seoul's surrounding province, Gyeonggi, were selected as filming locations, with South Korea's Ministry of Culture, Sports and Tourism reimbursing up to 30% of the studio's expenditures, as part of a state-funded incentive program.

=== Filming ===
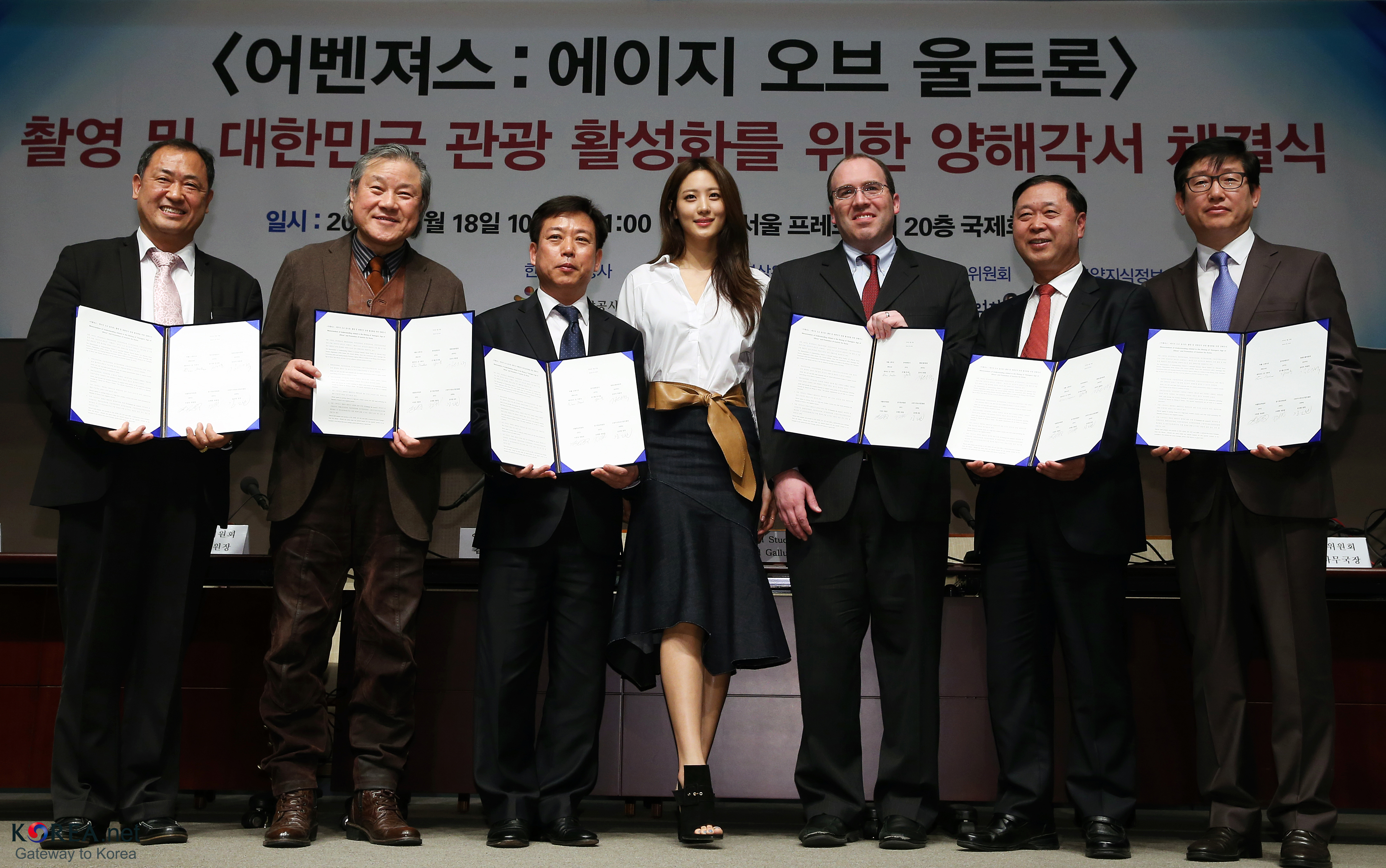
Members of the Korea Film Commission and executives from Marvel Studios signing a memorandum of understanding in Seoul in March 2014 with actress Claudia Kim (center) in attendance

Filming began on Tuesday, February 11, 2014, in Johannesburg, South Africa, having been postponed that Monday. Second unit crews shot action sequences without the main cast, to be used as background plates for scenes featuring the Hulk, in the Central Business District of Johannesburg for a period of two weeks. By mid-March, principal photography had begun at Shepperton Studios near London and was scheduled to film there for at least four months, under the working title After Party. Filming at Shepperton as well as other locations in England allowed Whedon to get a "number of different looks and textures and moods" to give the film a different palette and fresh aesthetic from its predecessor. Production designer Charles Wood built an enormous, new Avengers Tower set, one of the largest sets ever built for a Marvel film. The set featured multiple connected environments and levels. On March 22, production moved to Fort Bard, Italy and continued in the Aosta Valley region through March 28. The region doubled as the fictional Eastern European nation of Sokovia, with crews replacing local storefronts with Cyrillic script. Filming in South Korea began on March 30 on the Mapo Bridge, and continued through April 14 at various locations in Seoul, such as Cheongdam Bridge, Digital Media City, Gangnam Boulevard and road near Kaywon University of Art and Design in Uiwang. While in Seoul, the production was able to attach cameras to drones and race cars to get unique camera angles and footage. An artificial island on the Han River known as the Saebit Dungdungseom served as the headquarters of an IT institute featured in the film. Scenes involving Ultron's attack on parts of the city were shot in the Gangnam District.

In April, shooting began in Hawley Woods in Hampshire, England, and Hayley Atwell, who played Peggy Carter in previous MCU films, filmed scenes inside the Rivoli Ballroom in London while extras performed the Lindy Hop. That June, scenes were shot at the University of East Anglia in Norwich and at Dover Castle in Kent, with Dover Castle used for interior shots of Strucker's Hydra base in Sokovia. The next month, filming took place at a training facility for London's Metropolitan Police Service, which doubled as a city in Sokovia. Additional filming took place in Chittagong, Bangladesh, including the Chittagong Ship Breaking Yard, and in the state of New York. On August 6, Whedon announced on Twitter that he had completed principal photography on Avengers: Age of Ultron. Disney spent $330.6 million on Avengers: Age of Ultron from February 2013 to November 2014, but $50.7 million of this was offset by payments from the UK tax authority. A report on actual production costs for films from FilmL.A. Inc., indicated a gross budget of $444 million, with a net of $365 million for Avengers: Age of Ultron. This makes the film one of the most expensive films ever made.

Cinematographer Ben Davis, who also worked on the MCU film Guardians of the Galaxy (2014), shot Age of Ultron with a main unit of three Arri Alexa cameras. Davis said, "Although the Alexa was Marvel's preferred camera, we weren't locked into that choice from the start. What wasn't negotiable was the fact that we were shooting digital: that's how Marvel shoots all of its films." Davis also used Blackmagic Design's Pocket Cinema Cameras to meet the needs of the second unit kit explaining, "The second unit typically needs a fleet of smaller cameras that are less expensive and are rugged enough to handle the various trials by fire, as it were, that we throw at them." About the camera system, Whedon stated that this film was shot very differently from the first one; using many long lenses, and that he aimed to shoot the film almost like a documentary. To create the scenes depicting how Quicksilver views the world, scenes were shot with an ultra-high-speed camera and later combined with shots of Taylor-Johnson moving through the same scene at normal speed.

=== Post-production ===
The original shot (top) of the new Avengers training facility and the completed shot (bottom) with CG interiors added by Method Studios

In June 2014, the IMAX Corporation announced that the IMAX release of the film would be converted to IMAX 3D. Following the completion of principal photography several more cast members were revealed including Stellan Skarsgård as Erik Selvig, Anthony Mackie as Sam Wilson / Falcon, Idris Elba as Heimdall, and Tom Hiddleston as Loki, reprising their roles from previous MCU films. However, Hiddleston's scenes did not make the theatrical cut of the film, with Whedon saying what was shot "didn't play" and he did not want the film to feel "overstuffed". According to Hiddleston, "In test screenings, audiences had overemphasized Loki's role, so they thought that because I was in it, I was controlling Ultron, and it was actually imbalancing people's expectations." Whedon later explained that Elba and Atwell appear in the film because of exploring the psyches of the Avengers from Wanda's power. In December 2014, Kim's role was revealed as Dr. Helen Cho. Additional scenes were scheduled to be filmed in January 2015 at Pinewood Studios. In February 2015, Marvel confirmed through promotional material that Serkis portrays Ulysses Klaue in the film. In early April 2015, Linda Cardellini and Julie Delpy were confirmed to be part of the film's cast. At the same time, Whedon stated that the film would not contain a post-credits scene, which had become customary for MCU films. Whedon tried to come up with a post-credit scene but felt that he could not top the "Shawarma scene" in The Avengers, explaining, "It didn't seem to lend itself in the same way, and we wanted to be true to what felt right. The first rule of making a sequel is take the best moments and do something else. Don't do the Indiana Jones gun trick again differently. Just go somewhere else. Don't try to hit the same highs, because people will sense it." However, Feige clarified, "There will be a tag [shortly after the credits start]. But there's not a post–post–credit scene."

In May 2015, Whedon revealed he was in conflict with Marvel executives and the film's editors about certain scenes in the film. The executives were not "thrilled" with the scenes at Hawkeye's farm or the dream sequences the Avengers experience because of Wanda. Also, Whedon had originally shot a much longer scene with Thor and Selvig in the cave but the final version is shorter as test audiences did not respond well to the original cut. In the scene, Thor would be possessed by a Norn, a goddess of destiny, while Selvig would quiz her about Thor's hallucination. Additionally, Whedon reiterated he had wanted to include Captain Marvel and Spider-Man at the end, but deals for each character (signing of an actress and a deal with Sony Pictures Entertainment, respectively) were not completed in time for their inclusion.

The film contains 3,000 visual effects shots, completed by ten different visual effects studios, including Industrial Light & Magic (ILM), Trixter, Double Negative, Animal Logic, Framestore, Lola VFX, Territory, Perception, Method Studios, Luma Pictures, and The Third Floor. ILM opened a facility in London, citing Avengers: Age of Ultron as a catalyst for the expansion, and developed a new motion capture system for the film called Muse, which can better capture an actor's performance and combine different takes. About the motion capture process, Ruffalo called it "more of a collaboration" since the technology is advancing, with "the face capture and the motion capture can now [being] put together, [allowing] you [to] get a lot more latitude as a performer [...] you're no longer constricted by the attributes that you have as a person: your age, or weight, or size. None of that matters anymore. And so there's this whole exciting place to go that is kind of unknown." Visual effects supervisor Christopher Townsend said that the visual effects team considered depicting the Hulk when manipulated by Wanda Maximoff as being grey skinned with red eyes, but eventually decided against it, as they did not want to confuse audiences who might associate it with "Joe Fixit", the grey Hulk from the comics.

External videos
- Marvel Studios' Avengers: Age Of Ultron End Credits Main On End Title Sequence presents the film's main-on-end title sequence, YouTube video from Perception's channel

Method Studios created the interior of the new Avengers training facility by digitally designing the training facility, extracting the characters from the original set and placing them into the new CG environment. Method also contributed to Iron Man's new Mark 45 suit and played a key role in creating Wanda's CG mind control effect. Following the trend in recent years, most of the computer screens in Stark's lab, Dr. Cho's laboratory, the Quinjet and other locations in the film were not added in post-production but were actually working screens on set, adding to the realism of the film and saving some on the post-production budget. London-based Territory Studio delivered the screen visuals filled with unique imagery and animations that matched the character using them. Perception worked on the main-on-end and main titles for the film. Before settling on the marble monument depiction for the main-on-end titles, Perception created three other versions, which were based on Ultron's hive mind ability from the film, "renderings of power and pure energy" inspired by classic comic panels, and classic moments for each character. The final design was inspired by war monuments such as the Iwo Jima memorial. For the main titles, Marvel wanted the typeface to be a direct continuation of the first film. Perception made the typeface a marble texture to mimic the main-on-end titles and changed the title's rotation (away from the camera instead of towards the camera in The Avengers), before "Age of Ultron" overtakes "Avengers" in a vibranium texture.

== Music ==
Brian Tyler signed on to compose the film's score in March 2014. He replaced Alan Silvestri, who composed the score for the first film, and Tyler's hiring marked his third collaboration with Marvel following Iron Man 3 and Thor: The Dark World in 2013. Tyler said the score would pay homage to John Williams' music for Star Wars (1977), Superman (1978), and Raiders of the Lost Ark (1981) while referencing the scores for the Iron Man, Thor, and Captain America films in order to create a similar musical universe, saying, "That's the goal for sure. You have to build in nostalgia and do it upfront so you can relate to it." Danny Elfman also contributed music to the score, reprising Silvestri's theme from the first film to create a new hybrid theme. Hollywood Records released the album digitally on April 28, 2015, and in physical formats on May 19.

== Marketing ==
=== Promotion ===
At the 2013 San Diego Comic-Con, Whedon introduced a teaser trailer for the film, which included a look at an Ultron helmet and a title treatment. Footage of the teaser, as well as a brief interview with Whedon, was made available as part of Iron Man 3's second screen companion app for its Blu-ray release on September 24, 2013. On March 18, 2014, ABC aired a one-hour television special titled, Marvel Studios: Assembling a Universe, which included a sneak peek of Avengers: Age of Ultron. The special debuted concept art for Quicksilver and Scarlet Witch, as well as art of the Hulk fighting the "Hulkbuster" Iron Man suit. Harley-Davidson partnered with Marvel to provide their first electric motorcycle, Project LiveWire, for use by Black Widow in the film. As with previous films, Audi provided several vehicles for Age of Ultron and commercials promoting these vehicles. At the 2014 San Diego Comic-Con, the cast was introduced to promote the film, along with screening footage from the film. Avengers: Age of Ultron received the second most social media mentions at the convention, following Batman v Superman: Dawn of Justice (2016), but had a higher intend-to-see response.

External videos
- Marvel's "Avengers: Age of Ultron" – Teaser Trailer (OFFICIAL) The use of the song "I've Got No Strings" from Pinocchio (1940) was lauded by critics.

The first trailer was scheduled to premiere during the airing of an episode of Agents of S.H.I.E.L.D. on October 28, 2014. However, on October 22, the trailer leaked online, and within a few hours Marvel officially released the trailer on YouTube. Entertainment Weekly and The Hollywood Reporter noted the effective use of the song "I've Got No Strings" from Pinocchio (1940) in the trailer. Scott Mendelson of Forbes felt the trailer was "such a textbook 'dark sequel' trailer that it borders on parody" but said, "it's a pretty spectacular piece of marketing, one that elevates itself both by the music choices and by James Spader's vocals as the title villain". The trailer received 34.3 million global views in 24 hours, 26.2 million from Marvel's YouTube channel, which broke the previous record held by Iron Man 3 with 23.14 million views. In comparison, the original Avengers teaser received 20.4 million views in 24 hours after its debut. In response, Marvel agreed to air footage from Age of Ultron during the episode of Agents of S.H.I.E.L.D. that was originally scheduled to premiere the trailer. At the end of October, Marvel Comic's Editor-in-Chief Axel Alonso stated there were comic tie-in plans for the film.

In November 2014, ABC aired another one-hour television special titled Marvel 75 Years: From Pulp to Pop!, which featured behind the scenes footage of Age of Ultron. Also in November, an extended trailer debuted on Samsung Mobile's YouTube channel, featuring product placement for various Samsung devices. In December 2014, additional behind the scenes footage was released as a special feature on the Guardians of the Galaxy Blu-ray, highlighting the various filming locations for the film. That same month, ABC announced that an episode of Marvel's Agents of S.H.I.E.L.D. would tie-in to the events of the film. The episodes "The Frenemy of My Enemy" and "The Dirty Half Dozen" feature "Easter eggs, plot threads and other connective tissue leading into the opening scene of Avengers: Age of Ultron" while "Scars" explores the aftermath of the film.

In January 2015, a featurette focusing on Ultron was shown at Samsung's "Night With Marvel" event at the 2015 Consumer Electronics Show (CES). Also at CES, Samsung revealed a selection of hardware inspired by the Avengers films, as well as a simulation of Avengers Tower via its Gear VR virtual reality device. A second trailer premiered on ESPN on January 12, 2015, during the broadcast of the 2015 College Football Playoff National Championship. Mendelson enjoyed the trailer, but wished it did not reveal as many story elements as it did. However, he added, "the marketing thus far [for the film] has been far superior to much of what sold The Avengers three years ago, both in terms of the specific footage and the artistic choices being made [...] I'm sold, and I imagine most of the general moviegoers are already onboard too."

On February 3, 2015, Marvel "stealth released" a one-shot digital-only tie-in comic, Avengers: Age of Ultron Prelude—This Scepter'd Isle. Written by Will Corona Pilgrim and illustrated by Wellinton Alves, it reveals how Strucker came into possession of Loki's scepter and the origin of the Maximoff twins' abilities. At the end of the month, the film's official poster was revealed. Graeme McMillan of The Hollywood Reporter criticized it for its lack of originality, calling it "pretty much the poster for the first Avengers movie, except with added flying robots in the background" and the fact that it incorporated many of the same tropes the other MCU Phase Two film posters did. These included the hero(es) staring off camera; destruction in the background as well as something occurring in the sky; and poor Photoshop on the poster, highlighting the fact that each of the actors were obviously photographed separately and were later composited together into the poster. Mendelson agreed with many of McMillan's observations, and called the poster "hilariously photoshopped".

The final trailer was "unlocked" by fans on March 4, 2015, via the use of hashtags on Twitter, ahead of its broadcast debut during the series premiere of American Crime on March 5. Mendelson felt "this [was] a fine final trailer, teasing what we already know, hinting at the scale and a few new action beats without telling us much we don't already know" adding, "Here we have the fourth and final Avengers: Age of Ultron trailer and we don't know all that much about what transpires in a moment-to-moment sense in the finished 150-minute feature. I have expressed my concern dating back to October that Marvel and Disney would release too many trailers and would by default give away too much plot and character information between October and May. But if this really is the final Avengers 2 trailer, then at least on the trailer front they have kept the film relatively unspoiled." A week after the final trailer debuted, Marvel revealed that the trailer had "smashed records" with over 35 million views.

In April 2015, members of the cast presented Downey with the MTV Generation Award at the 2015 MTV Movie Awards, along with debuting an exclusive clip from the film. On April 27, Downey and Renner along with executives from Marvel Entertainment rang the opening bell of the New York Stock Exchange in celebration of the film's theatrical release. Disney spent a total of $26.9 million on television advertisements for the film, from an estimated total marketing budget of $180 million.

=== Merchandise ===
In January 2015, Warner Bros. Interactive Entertainment and Traveller's Tales announced a Lego video game adaptation of the first film and Age of Ultron for release in late 2015 on a variety of video game consoles. In March 2015, Disney said it planned to broaden its merchandising strategy with Avengers: Age of Ultron by expanding the target demographics to women and to fans of the individual superheroes that make up the Avengers. Paul Gitter, senior vice president of Marvel licensing for Disney Consumer Products, said, "For the first film, we primarily focused on the Avengers property and the group shots [...] Now we're broadening the line and scope to create skews that focus on the team and the individuals characters, as well." Disney Consumer Products partnered with Hasbro, Lego, Hot Wheels, and Funko for action figures, playsets, and other toys, and with Under Armour for apparel. Disney established new partnerships in the food and packaged-goods categories, including with Sage Fruit, ConAgra, Crunchpak, and Chobani. Walt Disney India's consumer products partnered with 50 brands to promote the film in India, considered the highest ever for any film—Hollywood or Bollywood—released in India (the previous record held by Ra.One (2011) had 25 partners). Some of the brands include Amazon India, toy retailer Hamleys India, online fashion store Myntra, Hero Cycles, Mountain Dew, Liberty Shoes, Tupperware, and Subway restaurants, among others. A virtual pinball table based on the film was released in April 2015 by Zen Studios.

== Release ==
=== Theatrical ===
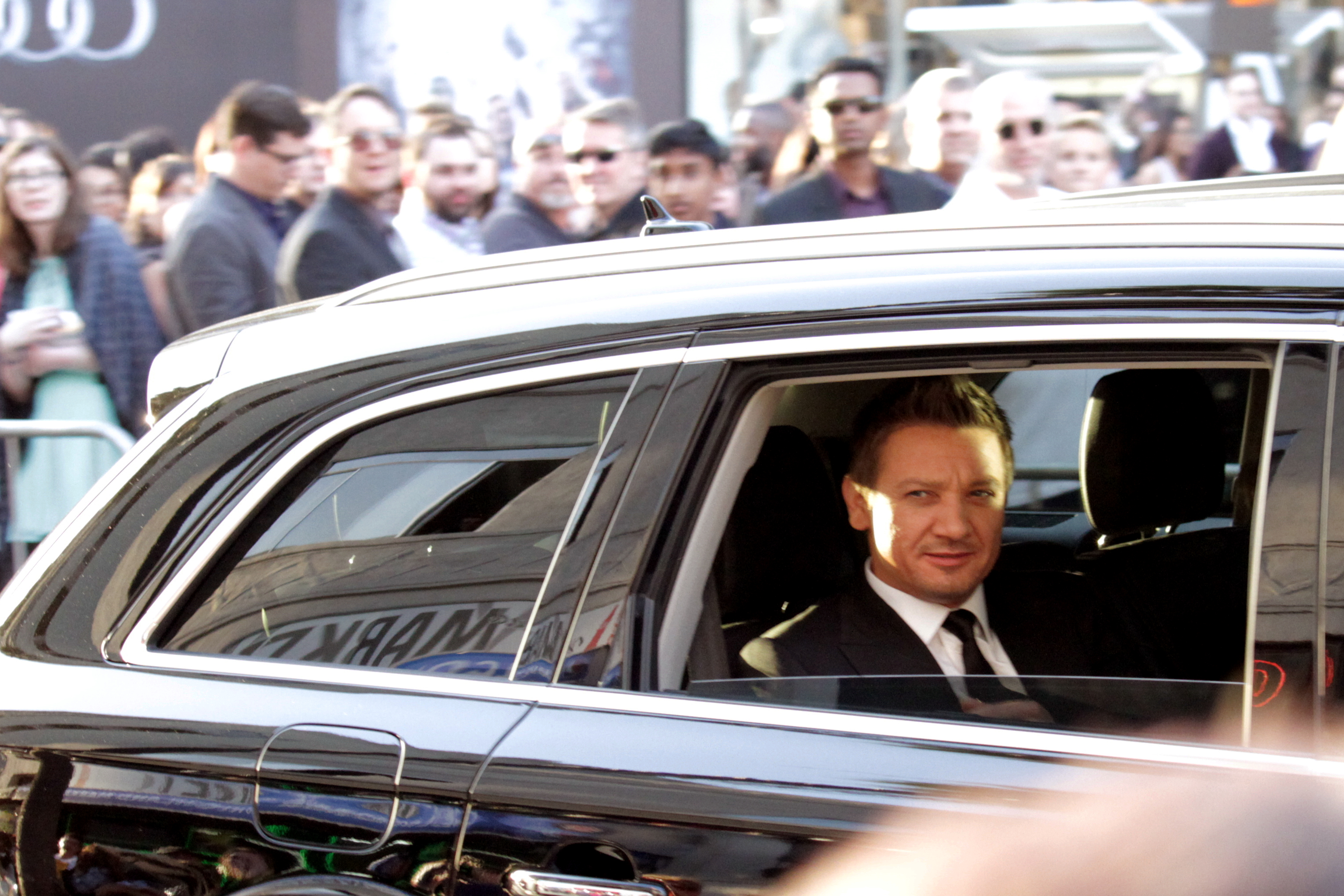
Renner arriving at the world premiere of Avengers: Age of Ultron

Avengers: Age of Ultron had its world premiere at the Dolby Theatre in Hollywood, Los Angeles, on April 13, 2015, and held its European premiere on April 21 at the Vue West End in London. The film was released in 11 territories on April 22, with its release jumping to 55% of its international market (44 countries) by the end of its first weekend, before releasing on May 1 in the United States, in 3D and IMAX 3D. In the United States, the film opened in 4,276 theaters, including 2,761 3D theaters, 364 IMAX, 400 premium large format, and 143 D-Box theaters. Many independent theater owners in Germany (approximately 700 screens) boycotted the film in response to Disney raising its rental fee from 47.7% to 53% of ticket sales. The owners felt that the "increased fees, coupled with the cost of digitization, and rising staff and marketing costs may force some of them out of business." Avengers: Age of Ultron is part of Phase Two of the MCU.

On March 4, 2015, ticket pre-sales for the film began. Variety noted, "The two-month gap between advance sales and the release is much wider than normal and reflects the heavy fan anticipation" for the film.

=== Home media ===
Avengers: Age of Ultron was released on digital download by Walt Disney Studios Home Entertainment on September 8, and on Blu-ray, Blu-ray 3D, and DVD on October 2. The digital and Blu-ray releases include behind-the-scenes featurettes, audio commentary, deleted scenes, and a blooper reel. The film was also collected in a 13-disc box set, titled "Marvel Cinematic Universe: Phase Two Collection", which includes all of the Phase Two films in the Marvel Cinematic Universe, and was released on December 8. In July 2015, Whedon stated that he did not intend on releasing a director's cut of Avengers: Age of Ultron because despite the film's complexity, he was satisfied with the theatrical version and did not think it needed to be tweaked. Walt Disney Studios Home Entertainment released the film on Ultra HD Blu-ray on August 14, 2018.

In September 2014, TNT acquired the US cable broadcast rights, for broadcast two years after its theatrical release.

== Reception ==
=== Box office ===
Avengers: Age of Ultron grossed $459 million in the United States and Canada, and $943.8 million in other territories, for a worldwide total of $1.403 billion, becoming the fifth-highest-grossing film at the time and the fourth-highest-grossing film of 2015. Avengers: Age of Ultron's worldwide opening of $392.5 million was the seventh-largest ever. The film set a worldwide IMAX opening-weekend record with $25.2 million (previously held by The Dark Knight Rises (2012)) and also broke the record for the fastest movie to make over $40 million in IMAX theaters, doing so in 12 days. According to some analysts, the opening weekend box office gross was lower than expected because of the weekend's featured boxing match between Floyd Mayweather Jr. and Manny Pacquiao. Deadline Hollywood calculated the film's net profit as $382.32 million, accounting for production budgets, marketing, talent participations, and other costs; box office grosses and home media revenues placed it fourth on their list of 2015's "Most Valuable Blockbusters".

On May 15, 2015, Avengers: Age of Ultron became the twenty-first film in cinematic history, the third Marvel Studios film, and the eighth film distributed by Disney to cross the $1 billion threshold at the box office.

==== United States and Canada ====
Avengers: Age of Ultron earned $84.46 million on its opening day, marking the biggest opening day for a superhero film and the second-biggest opening and second-biggest single-day gross, behind Harry Potter and the Deathly Hallows – Part 2 (2011) ($91.7 million). The film's Friday gross included $27.6 million from Thursday night, which began at 7 p.m., and was the sixth-highest ever for Thursday preview earnings and the highest among Marvel films. The film totaled $191.3 million in its opening weekend, the third-highest gross behind Jurassic World (2015) ($208.8 million) and The Avengers ($207.4 million). It also saw the second-highest IMAX opening weekend total with $18 million (behind The Dark Knight Rises), a record $13.5 million from premium large format theaters and the highest share for the first weekend in May, accounting for 85% of the top twelve box office total earnings (previously held by Spider-Man 3 (2007)). Of those in attendance the first weekend, 59% were male, 41% were female and 59% were over the age of 25.

In its second weekend, the film fell 59%, earning $77.7 million, which was the second-biggest second weekend gross behind The Avengers' $103 million (both were surpassed a month later by Jurassic World's $106.6 million). It holds the record for the second-biggest loss between first and second weekends with $113.6 million, only behind Deathly Hallows – Part 2's $121 million loss between its first and second weekends in 2011. It became the third-highest-grossing film of 2015.

==== Other territories ====
Avengers: Age of Ultron earned $200.2 million in its first weekend from 44 countries, opening in first in all, which was 44% above its predecessor's opening. Additionally, the film saw the largest non-China international IMAX opening with $10.4 million. The top earning countries were South Korea ($28.2 million), the United Kingdom ($27.3 million), and Russia ($16.2 million). The film broke records in many countries, including opening-day records in Mexico ($6.8 million), the Philippines ($1.6 million), and Indonesia ($900,000); opening-weekend records in Mexico ($25.5 million), Russia and the CIS ($16.2 million), Hong Kong ($6.4 million), and the Philippines ($7.7 million); and highest opening weekend for a superhero film in the United Kingdom ($27.3 million), Germany ($9.3 million), Sweden, Norway, and the Netherlands.

In the United Kingdom, where Age of Ultron was filmed, it earned $5.4 million on its opening day and $27.3 million during the weekend, setting an opening-weekend record for a superhero film, Marvel's biggest opening in Britain, the biggest April opening, and the eighth-biggest debut. It also set the best single-day earning for a Disney and superhero film with its $9.4 million haul on Saturday. In South Korea, also where part of the film was shot, the film earned $4.9 million on its opening day and $28.2 through the weekend. It held the record for advance-ticket sales rate, accounting for 96% of tickets reserved, breaking Transformers: Dark of the Moon's (2011) record of 94.6% in 2011, the widest release ever, across 1,826 screens, also breaking Dark of the Moon's 1,420 screens, and the fastest imported film to surpass one million admissions, doing so in two days; it topped the box office for three consecutive weekends, and became the biggest Disney/Marvel release as well as the second-biggest Western film in the country. The Chinese opening scored the biggest weekday opening day, as well as the biggest Disney/Marvel opening, with $33.9 million, and the second-biggest six-day start with $156.3 million (behind Furious 7 (2015)) of which $17.5 million came from IMAX theaters—the biggest ever. Age of Ultron also opened at number one in Japan in early July 2015 with $6.5 million, the highest opening weekend for an MCU release. As of March 10, 2019, it is the ninth-highest-grossing film, and the fourth-highest-grossing film of 2015. Its largest markets were China ($240.1 million), the United Kingdom ($75.5 million), and South Korea ($72.3 million).

=== Critical response ===
The review aggregator Rotten Tomatoes reported an approval rating of 75%, with an average score of 6.8/10, based on 371 reviews. The website's critical consensus reads, "Exuberant and eye-popping, Avengers: Age of Ultron serves as an overstuffed but mostly satisfying sequel, reuniting its predecessor's unwieldy cast with a few new additions and a worthy foe." Metacritic, which uses a weighted average, assigned the film a score of 66 out of 100 based on 49 critics, indicating "generally favorable" reviews. Audiences polled by CinemaScore gave the film an average grade of "A" on an A+ to F scale, and those at PostTrak gave the film a 90% overall positive score and a 79% recommend.

Todd McCarthy of The Hollywood Reporter said, "Avengers: Age of Ultron succeeds in the top priority of creating a worthy opponent for its superheroes and giving the latter a few new things to do, but this time the action scenes don't always measure up." Scott Foundas of Variety wrote, "If this is what the apotheosis of branded, big-studio entertainment has come to look like in 2015, we could be doing much worse. Unlike its title character, Age of Ultron most definitely has soul." Writing for the Chicago Sun-Times and giving the film three-and-a-half out of four stars, Richard Roeper said, "Some day, an Avengers film might collapse under the weight of its own awesomeness. I mean, how many times can they save the world? But this is not that day." Peter Travers of Rolling Stone wrote, "Age of Ultron is a whole summer of fireworks packed into one movie. It doesn't just go to 11, it starts there. [Joss Whedon] takes a few wrong turns, creating a jumble when the action gets too thick. But he recovers like a pro, devising a spectacle that's epic in every sense of the word." Matt Zoller Seitz of RogerEbert.com gave the film three out of four stars, stating that despite being "bigger, louder, and more disjointed" than its predecessor, "it's also got more personality—specifically Whedon's—than any other film in the now seven-year-old franchise." Helen O'Hara of Empire praised the interactions between the characters, the action set-pieces and Whedon's ability as a director in her review, stating that the film "redefines the scale we can expect from our superheroes."

Conversely, Kenneth Turan of the Los Angeles Times said, "Although this movie is effective moment to moment, very little of it lingers in the mind afterward. The ideal vehicle for our age of immediate sensation and instant gratification, it disappears without a trace almost as soon as it's consumed." Scott Mendelson of Forbes said, "Avengers: Age of Ultron plays like an obligation, a box to be checked off on a list before all parties move onto the things they really want to do." Manohla Dargis of The New York Times wrote, "This Avengers doesn't always pop the way that the first one sometimes did, partly because its villain isn't as memorable, despite Mr. Spader's silky threat." Camilla Long of The Sunday Times remarked, "Two hours of boredom and boobs add up to a sorry basis for the new Avengers." Much like the release of Guardians of the Galaxy, the film received mixed reviews upon release in China, due to poor translations. The translations, which were said to be too literal, were thought "to have been done by Google Translate."

=== Accolades ===
Accolades received by Avengers: Age of Ultron
Award	Date of ceremony	Category	Recipient(s)	Result	Ref.
AACTA Awards	December 9, 2015	Best Visual Effects or Animation	Christopher Townsend, Ryan Stafford, Paul Butterworth, and Matt Estela	Nominated	
Annie Awards	February 6, 2016	Outstanding Achievement for Animated Effects in a Live Action Production	Michael Balog, Jim Van Allen, Florent Andorra, and Georg Kaltenbrunner for "Sokovia's destruction"	Won	
Annie Awards	February 6, 2016	Outstanding Achievement for Character Animation in a Live Action Production	Jakub Pistecky, Gang Trinh, Craig Penn, Mickael Coedel, and Yair Gutierrez for "the Hulk"	Nominated	
Annie Awards	February 6, 2016	Outstanding Achievement for Character Animation in a Live Action Production	Peter Tan, Boonyiki Lim, Sachio Nishiyama, Byounghee Cho, and Roy Tan for "Ultron"	Nominated	
Golden Trailer Awards	May 30, 2014	Best Motion/Title Graphics	"Reveal" (MOCEAN)	Nominated	
Golden Trailer Awards	May 6, 2015	Best Summer Blockbuster Trailer	"Strings" (MOCEAN)	Won	
Golden Trailer Awards	May 6, 2015	Best Sound Editing	"Strings" (MOCEAN)	Won	
Hollywood Music in Media Awards	November 11, 2015	Best Original Score in a Sci-Fi/Fantasy Film	Danny Elfman and Brian Tyler	Nominated	
Hugo Awards	August 20, 2016	Best Dramatic Presentation, Long Form	Joss Whedon	Nominated	
Movieguide Awards	February 5, 2016	Best Movie for Mature Audiences	Avengers: Age of Ultron	Nominated	
MTV Movie Awards	April 10, 2016	Movie of the Year	Avengers: Age of Ultron	Nominated	
MTV Movie Awards	April 10, 2016	Best Hero	Chris Evans	Nominated	
MTV Movie Awards	April 10, 2016	Best Villain	James Spader	Nominated	
MTV Movie Awards	April 10, 2016	Best Virtual Performance	James Spader	Nominated	
MTV Movie Awards	April 10, 2016	Ensemble Cast	Avengers: Age of Ultron	Nominated	
MTV Movie Awards	April 10, 2016	Best Fight	Robert Downey Jr. vs. Mark Ruffalo	Nominated	
Nickelodeon Kids' Choice Awards	March 12, 2016	Favorite Movie	Avengers: Age of Ultron	Nominated	
Nickelodeon Kids' Choice Awards	March 12, 2016	Favorite Movie Actor	Chris Evans	Nominated	
Nickelodeon Kids' Choice Awards	March 12, 2016	Favorite Movie Actor	Chris Hemsworth	Nominated	
Nickelodeon Kids' Choice Awards	March 12, 2016	Favorite Movie Actor	Robert Downey Jr.	Nominated	
Nickelodeon Kids' Choice Awards	March 12, 2016	Favorite Movie Actress	Scarlett Johansson	Nominated	
People's Choice Awards	January 6, 2016	Favorite Movie	Avengers: Age of Ultron	Nominated	
People's Choice Awards	January 6, 2016	Favorite Action Movie	Avengers: Age of Ultron	Nominated	
People's Choice Awards	January 6, 2016	Favorite Movie Actor	Robert Downey Jr.	Nominated	
People's Choice Awards	January 6, 2016	Favorite Movie Actress	Scarlett Johansson	Nominated	
People's Choice Awards	January 6, 2016	Favorite Action Movie Actor	Robert Downey Jr.	Nominated	
People's Choice Awards	January 6, 2016	Favorite Action Movie Actor	Chris Hemsworth	Won	
People's Choice Awards	January 6, 2016	Favorite Action Movie Actress	Scarlett Johansson	Nominated	
Saturn Awards	June 22, 2016	Best Comic-to-Film Motion Picture	Avengers: Age of Ultron	Nominated	
Saturn Awards	June 22, 2016	Best Supporting Actor	Paul Bettany	Nominated	
Saturn Awards	June 22, 2016	Best Film Costume Design	Alexandra Byrne	Won	
Saturn Awards	June 22, 2016	Best Film Special / Visual Effects	Paul Corbould, Chris Townsend, Ben Snow, and Paul Butterworth	Nominated	
Teen Choice Awards	August 16, 2015	Choice Movie: Sci-Fi/Fantasy	Avengers: Age of Ultron	Nominated	
Teen Choice Awards	August 16, 2015	Choice Movie Actor: Sci-Fi/Fantasy	Chris Hemsworth	Nominated	
Teen Choice Awards	August 16, 2015	Choice Movie Actor: Sci-Fi/Fantasy	Robert Downey Jr.	Nominated	
Teen Choice Awards	August 16, 2015	Choice Movie Actress: Sci-Fi/Fantasy	Scarlett Johansson	Nominated	
Teen Choice Awards	August 16, 2015	Choice Movie: Scene Stealer	Chris Evans	Won	
Teen Choice Awards	August 16, 2015	Choice Movie: Breakout Star	Elizabeth Olsen	Nominated	
Visual Effects Society Awards	February 2, 2016	Outstanding Animated Performance in a Photoreal Feature	Jakub Pistecky, Lana Lan, John Walker, and Sean Comer for "Hulk"	Nominated	
Visual Effects Society Awards	February 2, 2016	Outstanding Effects Simulations in a Photoreal Feature	Michael Balog, Jim Van Allen, Florent Andorra, and Georg Kaltenbrunner for "Hulk vs. Hulkbuster"	Nominated	
Visual Effects Society Awards	February 2, 2016	Outstanding Models in a Photoreal or Animated Project	Howie Weed, Robert Marinic, Daniel Gonzalez, and Myriam Catrin for "Hulkbuster"	Nominated	

== Sequels ==
Avengers: Infinity War and Avengers: Endgame were directed by Anthony and Joe Russo, from a script by Christopher Markus and Stephen McFeely. Infinity War was released on April 27, 2018, followed by Endgame on April 26, 2019. Much of the cast returns for the two films, with additional cast and characters joining from other MCU films.

== See also ==
- "What If... Ultron Won?", an episode of the MCU television series What If...? that reimagines the events of this film
