= Plat du Jour =

Studio album by Matthew Herbert
- Released: 8 August 2005
- Genre: Electronic
- Length: 59:42
- Label: Accidental Records
- Producer: Matthew Herbert

Matthew Herbert chronology
Plat du Jour: The Appetiser EP (2005)	Plat du Jour (2005)	Score (2007)

Professional ratings
Aggregate scores
Source	Rating
Metacritic	73/100
Review scores
Source	Rating
Exclaim!	favorable
The Guardian	favorable
Pitchfork	6.1/10
PopMatters	8/10 stars
Stylus Magazine	A−

Plat du Jour is a studio album by British electronic musician Matthew Herbert. It was released on Accidental Records in 2005. The album was created using the sounds of food preparation and production. "Celebrity" features a vocal contribution from Dani Siciliano.

== Critical reception ==
At Metacritic, which assigns a weighted average score out of 100 to reviews from mainstream critics, Plat du Jour received an average score of 73% based on 12 reviews, indicating "generally favorable reviews".

Tim O'Neil of PopMatters gave the album 8 stars out of 10, saying, "the juxtaposition of Herbert's precise, seemingly innocent and light-hearted rhythms with heavier themes of economic exploitation and death creates an effective and practical dialectic." Rob Woo of Exclaim! called it "one of the most bizarre concept albums to date".

The Wire listed the album on their "2005 Rewind" list.

== Track listing ==
No.	Title	Length
1.	"The Truncated Life of a Modern Industrialised Chicken"	7:41
2.	"These Branded Waters"	5:28
3.	"Pigs in Shit"	0:19
4.	"An Empire of Coffee"	7:04
5.	"Celebrity"	4:05
6.	"Sugar"	5:50
7.	"An Apple a Day..."	1:32
8.	"White Bread, Brown Bread"	4:08
9.	"Fatter, Slimmer, Faster, Slower"	3:58
10.	"The Final Meal of Stacey Lawton"	5:38
11.	"The Nine Seeds of Navdanya"	4:15
12.	"Waste Land"	6:03
13.	"Nigella, George, Tony and Me"	3:47
