= Territory Studio =

Independent creative agency headquartered in London

- Founded: 2010
- Headquarters: London, England
- Number of locations: London, England; San Francisco, California, USA
- Services: Visual effects, Motion graphics, design
- Website: www.territorystudio.com

Territory Studio is an independent creative agency established in 2010 and headquartered in London, with offices in San Francisco and New York City. Although the company is known for its user interface design seen in blockbuster films, it also works on design and digital projects for various commercial clients.

The company has created on-screen graphics and user interfaces for many sci-fi films, including Guardians of the Galaxy and Ex Machina. Territory has also produced the screens for the NASA control room in The Martian, as well as screens for the spaceship and Martian lab. On this project, the studio worked directly with NASA to imagine the interfaces humans would use to communicate between extraterrestrial explorers and Earth.

Territory has also designed branding and graphics for Virgin Atlantic, Space NK and the Guardian, interactives for Lord's, done UI design for Microsoft Xbox Sport, iPad apps for Vogue, and website design for JJ Sweeney.

== Recent projects ==
=== Films ===
Recent projects include Dune, No Time to Die, Ad Astra, Spider-Man: Far From Home, Avengers: Endgame, Pacific Rim Uprising, Blade Runner 2049, Guardians of The Galaxy, Avengers: Age of Ultron, Spy, Hitman: Agent 47, Ex Machina, Jupiter Ascending, Fast and Furious 6, The Gray Man, and Prometheus.

=== Music ===
Territory produced the "Godlike" and "Trial by Fire" promo videos for electropop artist PUZZLE.

== Awards ==
Nominated for D&AD award under the category 'Animation & Illustration for Websites & Digital Design 2014' for the DNA Explainer film for BBC Knowledge.

Won "Best Use of Public Relations in a Sponsorship Campaign" at The Hollis Sponsorship Awards, a "Gold Award" and a highly commended for "Best Film" at the IVCA Awards and shortlisted for the Sports Industry Awards for the 2012 Santander London Grand Prix film (in co-operation with INK).
