= The Shakes =

Studio album by Herbert
- Released: 1 June 2015
- Genre: Electronic
- Length: 65:14
- Label: Accidental Records
- Producer: Matthew Herbert

Herbert chronology
Scale (2006)	The Shakes (2015)

Professional ratings
Aggregate scores
Source	Rating
Metacritic	74/100
Review scores
Source	Rating
Exclaim!	8/10
The Irish Times	3/5 stars
MusicOMH	3.5/5 stars
Resident Advisor	3.5/5

The Shakes is a studio album by British electronic musician Herbert. It was released under Accidental Records in 2015.

== Critical reception ==
At Metacritic, which assigns a weighted average score out of 100 to reviews from mainstream critics, The Shakes received an average score of 74% based on 7 reviews, indicating "generally favorable reviews".

Daniel Sylvester of Exclaim! gave the album an 8 out of 10, saying, "The Shakes is nonetheless brimming with alien sounds and left-field rhythms (culled from objects purchased on eBay), proving that even the most subdued Herbert release is still pretty damn fascinating." Daniel Paton of MusicOMH gave the album 3.5 stars out of 5, saying: "It might be a return to dance music, but it's far from disposable."

== Track listing ==
No.	Title	Length
1.	"Battle"	7:05
2.	"Middle"	4:32
3.	"Strong"	4:00
4.	"Smart"	4:13
5.	"Stop"	6:26
6.	"Ones"	1:16
7.	"Bed"	6:07
8.	"Even"	6:46
9.	"Safety"	4:27
10.	"Silence"	7:41
11.	"Warm"	2:17
12.	"Peak"	10:29
