= Dani Siciliano =

American musician

- Origin: Sierra Vista, Arizona
- Genres: Electronica, jazz
- Instruments: Vocals, clarinet
- Years active: 1998–present
- Label: !K7

Dani Siciliano is an American singer. She has worked with Matthew Herbert on several of his projects including the albums Around the House, Bodily Functions and Scale. She has also released three solo albums, Likes..., Slappers and Dani Siciliano.

== Early life ==
Siciliano grew up in Arizona and moved to San Francisco when her father, a civil servant in the Department of Defense, was transferred there. She sang in church as a child and at the age of seven she began playing the clarinet. While attending the University of Richmond she was a member of a jazz combo, playing gigs at local cafés.

After college, in the mid-1990s, Siciliano began DJing in San Francisco. She played 1970s disco, funk, and soul records that she was able to buy inexpensively at thrift stores. While living in San Francisco she also worked as a nanny which led to a chance meeting with Matt Herbert. He visited the family that she worked for in 1995 and the two met. This led to her visiting London, working with him on his album Around the House, and eventually moving there and marrying him. Their marriage subsequently ended.

== With Matthew Herbert ==
Siciliano has worked with Herbert on several of his projects including Herbert, the Matthew Herbert Big Band, and Doctor Rockit. The pairing began with 1998's Around the House with Siciliano providing "sultry vocal work". Other Herbert releases that she has contributed to are 2001's Bodily Functions and 2006's Scale. On Bodily Functions she contributed vocals to the entire album and her singing on Scale has been called "sumptuous".

She also provided vocals on "Summer Love" from the 2000 release Indoor Fireworks by Matthew Herbert's Doctor Rockit project. She is featured on "Simple Mind", which has been called "the coolest track" from the 2001 Matthew Herbert Big Band release Goodbye Swingtime. She has also toured with Herbert's big band.

== Other collaborations ==
Siciliano is also featured on two tracks, "You, Me and Us" and "Wandering", from the 2002 release by Andy Brooks, You, Me and Us.

== Solo career ==
=== Likes... ===
Likes... is Siciliano's first solo album. It was released by !K7 records in 2004 and was recorded and produced by Siciliano in her home-studio with additional production from her husband Matt Herbert. It contains a cover of the Nirvana song "Come as You Are". It debuted at number 28 on CMJs airplay chart.

=== Slappers ===
Sicilano's second album, Slappers was released in September 2006. It was also mainly self-produced and released by !K7. It was made in the same year that she worked on Herbert's album Scale. The album includes the country blues single "Why Can't I Make You High?" with backing vocals from Kitty Daisy & Lewis. The track includes a sample of the sound of "some of her girlfriends...slapping their own asses".

=== Dani Siciliano ===
Her third Solo Album Dani Siciliano with 11 titles was released in 2016.

== Vocal style ==
Siciliano has never been classically trained as a vocalist, but has worked with a vocal coach. Her voice has been compared to Anita O'Day, Siouxsie Sioux and Ella Fitzgerald.

== Discography ==
Albums

- Likes... (2004)
- Slappers (2006)
- Dani Siciliano (2016)

Singles

- "Walk the Line" (2003)
- "Extra Ordinary" (2004)
- "Why Can't I Make You High" b/w "Who's Blues" (2006)
- "I'm The Question" (2016)
