= There's Me and There's You =

Studio album by the Matthew Herbert Big Band
- Released: 17 November 2008
- Genre: Electronic, jazz
- Length: 59:39
- Label: Accidental Records, Studio !K7
- Producer: Matthew Herbert

The Matthew Herbert Big Band chronology
Goodbye Swingtime (2003)	There's Me and There's You (2008)	The State Between Us (2019)

Professional ratings
Aggregate scores
Source	Rating
Metacritic	60/100
Review scores
Source	Rating
MusicOMH	4.5/5 stars
Pitchfork	4.0/10
PopMatters	5/10 stars
URB	4/5 stars

There's Me and There's You is the second studio album by the Matthew Herbert Big Band. It was released on Accidental Records and Studio !K7 in 2008.

== Critical reception ==
At Metacritic, which assigns a weighted average score out of 100 to reviews from mainstream critics, the album received an average score of 60% based on 11 reviews, indicating "mixed or average reviews".

Tim O'Neil of PopMatters gave the album 4 stars out of 10, saying: "It's an interesting album, just not interesting in a way that particularly compels me to listen to it again." Noah Levine of URB gave the album 4 stars out of 5, saying: "The developed avant-jazz compositions stand out just fine, but with all their consequential underpinnings, Herbert and the band are swinging on all levels."

MusicOMH placed it at number 38 on the "Top 50 Best Albums of 2008" list.

== Track listing ==
No.	Title	Length
1.	"The Story"	6:26
2.	"Pontificate"	2:55
3.	"Waiting"	5:37
4.	"The Yesness"	4:50
5.	"Battery"	6:17
6.	"Regina"	5:35
7.	"The Rich Man's Prayer"	4:05
8.	"Breathe"	7:29
9.	"Knowing"	2:80
10.	"Nonsound"	3:15
11.	"One Life"	5:34
12.	"Just Swing"	5:31

iTunes deluxe edition bonus track
No.	Title	Length
13.	"Blow the Final Whistle"	5:38
