= Around the House =

Studio album by Herbert
- Released: 27 July 1998
- Recorded: January 1997–April 1998
- Genre: Electronic; electroacoustic
- Length: 73:50
- Label: Phonography
- Producer: Herbert

Herbert chronology
Parts Remixed (1996)	Around the House (1998)	Bodily Functions (2001)

Singles from Around the House
- 1. "Going Round" Released: 1997; 2. "Never Give Up" Released: 1997; 3. "So Now..." Released: 1998

Around the House is a 1998 studio album by British electronic musician Herbert. It is an electroacoustic album using "samples of washing machines, toasters and toothbrushes, processed into swinging grooves".

== Critical reception ==
Professional ratings
Review scores
Source	Rating
AllMusic	4.5/5 stars
Muzik	4/5 stars
Pitchfork	8.7/10
The Rolling Stone Album Guide	3.5/5 stars

John Bush of AllMusic deemed Around the House "much more suited to straight-ahead dance music than Herbert's previous work" and stated that Herbert "proves quite adept" at creating backing music for the album's featured vocalist Dani Siciliano. Pitchfork reviewer Mark Richardson described Around the House as "a bit more focused on sound than song" compared to its 2001 follow-up Bodily Functions; while finding Bodily Functions a stronger album, he admitted that "this could well be a matter of which record I heard first" and concluded, "Both albums are loaded with music of exceptionally high quality."

Around the House was named the 96th greatest album of the 1990s by Pitchfork.

== Track listing ==
No.	Title	Writer(s)	Length
1.	Untitled	M. Herbert	0:52
2.	"So Now..."	M. Herbert, D. Siciliano	5:41
3.	"Around the House"	M. Herbert	4:34
4.	"Close to Me"	M. Herbert	6:37
5.	"The Last Beat"	M. Herbert	5:27
6.	"Going Round"	M. Herbert, D. Siciliano	6:55
7.	"This Time"	M. Herbert, D. Siciliano	8:04
8.	"We Still Have (The Music)"	M. Herbert, D. Siciliano	6:27
9.	"In the Kitchen"	M. Herbert, R. Vine	12:12
10.	"Never Give Up"	M. Herbert	11:43
11.	"We Go Wrong"	M. Herbert	5:11

== Personnel ==
Credits adapted from liner notes.

- Matthew Herbert – production, piano, Rhodes piano, guitar, bass guitar, violin, backing vocals
- Dani Siciliano – vocals
- R. Vine – guitar, bass guitar
