= Secondhand Sounds =

Compilation album by Herbert
- Released: 2002
- Recorded: 1996–2001
- Genre: Electronic
- Length: 136:42
- Label: Peacefrog
- Producer: Herbert

Herbert chronology
Bodily Functions (2001)	Secondhand Sounds (2002)	Scale (2006)

Secondhand Sounds is a compilation album of remixes by British electronic musician Herbert. Recorded between 1996 and 2001, it was released on Peacefrog Records in 2002.

== Critical reception ==
Professional ratings
Review scores
Source	Rating
AllMusic	4/5 stars
Muzik	5/5 stars
Pitchfork	9.0/10
Resident Advisor	4.5/5
The Rolling Stone Album Guide	4.5/5 stars

Denise Benson of Exclaim! wrote, "Few contemporary producers have been able to carve such a distinctive sound while remaining so fluid and open, yet Herbert seems to do so effortlessly." Mark Richardson of Pitchfork complimented "Herbert's imperialistic way with the source material", and Andy Battaglia of The A.V. Club said, "Herbert is an idea man who brings theory out of its studious back rooms and into a realm equally suited for home listening and smile-widening club revelry."

John Bush of AllMusic praised Herbert as "the most inventive remixer active", while also stating, "For better, but occasionally for worse, virtually all of these tracks are immediately recognizable as Herbert productions; the point-perfect beats, quick bassline fills, and his use of split-second samples and crackly vocals to drive the tracks sound more like a formula than a blueprint after several soundalikes come one after another."

== Track listing ==
Disc 1
No.	Title	Original artist(s)	Length
1.	"Merciful (Herbert's We Mix)"	Nils Petter Molvaer	6:13
2.	"Ezio (Herbert Remix)"	Motorbass	7:41
3.	"Street Lullaby (Herbert's Gutter Dub)"	Two Banks of Four	5:54
4.	"Highlife (Remember Herbert's Mix)"	Mono	6:40
5.	"The Last Beat (House Dub)"	Herbert	4:55
6.	"Banquet (Herbert Remix)"	Herbert	7:09
7.	"Tape Measure (Herbert's Metric Mix)"	Doctor Rockit	5:38
8.	"Future Luv (Herbert 'Did This' Mix)"	Presence	5:58
9.	"Want Me Like Water (Herbert's Tension Dub)" (featuring Terra Deva)	Furry Phreaks	6:14
10.	"Thoughts (Herbert Remix)"	Herbert	5:04
11.	"Fresh Start (Searching for Herbert's Mix)"	Terra Deva	5:53

Disc 2
No.	Title	Original artist(s)	Length
1.	"Can't Take It (Herbert's Some Dumb Dub)"	Recloose	7:12
2.	"Sing It Back (Herbert's Tasteful Dub)"	Moloko	6:00
3.	"Koppchen (Herbert's D-D-D-Dazzle Dub)"	Dimbiman	6:30
4.	"Hoping (Herbert's High Dub)"	Louie Austen	6:37
5.	"Fantasy (Herbert's Reality Dub)" (featuring Sajaeda)	Blaze Presents Cassioware	8:00
6.	"Suddenly (Herbert's Redub)"	Herbert	6:29
7.	"The Flipside (Herbert's Surround Sound Mix)"	Moloko	7:19
8.	"Before (Herbert's After Dub)"	dZihan & Kamien	7:43
9.	"Bonnie & Clyde (Herbert's Fred & Ginger Mix)"	Serge Gainsbourg	7:35
10.	"Aerosoul (Herbert Remix)"	Wishmountain	5:58
