= Rispah =

Studio album by The Invisible
- Released: 12 June 2012
- Length: 49:24
- Label: Ninja Tune
- Producer: Richard File

The Invisible chronology
The Invisible (2009)	Rispah (2012)

Rispah is the second album by the English band The Invisible, released by Ninja Tune on 12 June 2012.

== Reception ==
Professional ratings
Aggregate scores
Source	Rating
Metacritic	74/100
Review scores
Source	Rating
Clash	7/10
The Guardian	3/5 stars
Under the Radar	8/10 stars

Upon the release, the album received favorable reviews. On the review aggregator Metacritic, the album has the score of 74 out of 100, based on 12 reviews by professional critics.

== Track listing ==
No.	Title	Length
1.	"A Particle of Love"	1:28
2.	"Generational"	4:56
3.	"Wings"	3:26
4.	"Lifeline"	4:35
5.	"What Happened"	3:02
6.	"The Great Wound"	4:02
7.	"Surrender"	4:24
8.	"Utopia"	4:27
9.	"The Wall"	6:00
10.	"The Stain"	5:17
11.	"Protection"	7:47
Total length:		49:24

iTunes bonus track
No.	Title	Length
12.	"Uninhibited"	4:37
Total length:		54:01
