= The Invisible (band) =

English band

- Origin: South East London, England
- Genres: Alternative rock; neo-soul; experimental rock
- Years active: 2006–present
- Labels: Ninja Tune, Accidental
- Members: Dave Okumu; Tom Herbert; Leo Taylor
- Website: Ninja Tune

The Invisible are an English band, fronted by the singer and guitarist Dave Okumu. The band formed as Okumu's solo project but quickly developed into a full-fledged band with friends Tom Herbert (bass, keyboards) and Leo Taylor (drums). Their self-titled debut album, released on 9 March 2009, was nominated for the Mercury Prize and selected as critics choice for iTunes album of the year.

== History ==
The Invisible began in 2006 with Okumu, who – encouraged by Matthew Herbert to record solo material – soon realised he required the input of friends Leo Taylor (formerly of Gramme and Zongamin) and Tom Herbert (a member of Polar Bear (British band) and Acoustic Ladyland) to make real the sounds inside his head. Herbert's Accidental Records spawned the production of the band's first official release, the one-track 7 inch vinyl "Constant" in early 2008.

The name arrived after the three began writing. The moniker is a nod to the writing of Irish philosopher and poet John O'Donohue, who articulated the notion that humans exist in parallel worlds – the visible and the invisible; one physical, one spiritual.

In February 2008, the band's single "Monster's Waltz", made available through their MySpace page, was promoted by BBC Radio 1 DJ Zane Lowe. Playing numerous live dates and supporting bands such as Foals and Hot Chip, The Invisible's exploratory, expansive pop music continued to gather attention over the following months. The band's third single, "London Girl", received widespread and attention and praise upon release in December 2008.

The Invisible released their eponymous debut album on 9 March 2009. Produced by Matthew Herbert, The Invisible was nominated for the Mercury Prize and selected as critics choice for iTunes album of the year.

Their singles have been remixed by a number of acts, including Matthew Herbert, Micachu, Joe Goddard of Hot Chip and Kwes.

== Reception ==
The band's tongue-in-cheek definition of their style of music is 'Experimental Genre-Spanning Spacepop'. They have been compared to bands such as Bloc Party and TV on the Radio, even though Dave Okumu has strongly denied knowledge of the latter of these.

The band received widespread praise for their debut album – The Invisible was awarded 4 out of 5 stars from music magazines Q and Mojo, whilst being described by BBC Music as "a towering work that's enough to captivate the minds of even the most desperate souls out there". The album also received positive reviews from newspapers including The Sun, The Independent, and Metro.

== Production work and second album ==
The Invisible's second album, Rispah was released on Ninja Tune in August 2012, having been recorded in Brighton with producer Richard File. The album's first single "Protection" was premiered through online music magazine, The Quietus. Rispah was named after frontman Dave Okumu's mother, Rispah Achieng Okumu, who died during the making of the second album.

Outside of the band endeavours, members have embarked on production and session work. Dave Okumu has co-written and produced South London singer Jessie Ware's debut album, Devotion, which was later recognised as Album of the Year (2012) by the Mercury Prize. Okumu has performed and recorded with many artists such as Amy Winehouse, St. Vincent, Jane Birkin, Sara Creative Partners, Brigitte Fontaine, Theo Parrish, Tony Allen, King Sunny Adé, Omar, Matthew Herbert, Dani Siciliano, Toddla T, Bilal, Jack De Johnette, Róisín Murphy, Rosie Lowe and Anna Calvi. Tom Herbert continues to play as part of post-jazz band Polar Bear; Leo Taylor has contributed drums for Jessie Ware's second single "Running", Kate Nash's album "Made of Bricks", Kano's album "Home Sweet Home" and Adele's second album 21, including its leading single "Rolling in the Deep". The band also played on Adele's 2012 James Bond theme, Skyfall.

== Discography ==
=== Albums ===
- The Invisible (9 March 2009, Accidental)
- Rispah (8 June 2012, Ninja Tune)
- Patience (10 June 2016, Ninja Tune)

=== Singles ===
- "Constant/Passion" (7 inch single, 2007)
- "Monster's Waltz" (7 inch single, 2008)
- "London Girl" (single, 2008)
- "OK" (single, 2009)
- "Come Together" (The Beatles cover) (2009)
- "Protection" (single, 2012)
- "Wings" (12 inch single, 2012)
- "Generational" (12 inch single, 2012)

=== Compilation appearances ===
- "Spiral" (single on Gilles Peterson's Brownswood Bubblers Three compilation, 2008)
- "Monster's Waltz (Rework Medley)" (appears on Micachu & Kwes' Kwesachu Mixtape Vol.1, 2009)
