= Bodily Functions (album) =

Studio album by Herbert
- Released: 5 June 2001
- Recorded: 1997–2001
- Genre: House; deep house
- Length: 72:14
- Label: !K7
- Producer: Matthew Herbert

Herbert chronology
Around the House (1998)	Bodily Functions (2001)	Secondhand Sounds (2002)

Singles from Bodily Functions
- 1. "Leave Me Now" Released: 2000; 2. "Suddenly" Released: 2000; 3. "The Audience" Released: 2001; 4. "Addiction" Released: 2002

Bodily Functions is a studio album by British electronic musician Herbert. It was released by !K7 Records in 2001.

== Critical reception ==
Professional ratings
Review scores
Source	Rating
AllMusic	4.5/5 stars
Fact	4.5/5
Muzik	5/5
Pitchfork	8.8/10
Resident Advisor	4.5/5
Rolling Stone	3.5/5 stars
The Rolling Stone Album Guide	4.5/5 stars
Slant Magazine	4/5 stars
Spin	8/10
Uncut	4/5 stars

John Bush of AllMusic praised Bodily Functions as "the perfect marriage of art and intelligence". Sal Cinquemani of Slant Magazine said: "Often jazzy, often housey and sometimes folky, the album rarely misses a beat in any of its assumed genres." PopMatters writer Kevin Strychalski called the album Herbert's "Mona Lisa", writing that "never before has an artist working within the electronic medium delivered an album of such depth and maturity." Slant Magazine named Bodily Functions the third best album of 2001.

Pitchfork placed Bodily Functions at number 173 on its list of the top 200 albums of the 2000s. Bodily Functions was also named the 16th best album of the decade by Resident Advisor.

== Track listing ==
No.	Title	Length
1.	"You're Unknown to Me"	2:13
2.	"It's Only"	7:21
3.	"Foreign Bodies"	5:37
4.	"Suddenly"	6:29
5.	"I Know"	4:24
6.	"Leave Me Now"	6:36
7.	"The Last Beat"	4:20
8.	"You Saw It All"	7:04
9.	"On Reflection"	4:29
10.	"About This Time Each Day"	3:44
11.	"Addiction"	6:44
12.	"I Miss You"	4:52
13.	"It's Only a Reprise"	1:57
14.	"The Audience"	6:15

== Personnel ==
Credits adapted from liner notes.

- Matthew Herbert – production, piano, Rhodes piano, violin, bass guitar
- Dani Siciliano – vocals, clarinet
- Luca Santucci – vocals
- Shingai Shoniwa – vocals
- Peter Wraight – bass clarinet, flugelhorn, flute, trumpet
- John Matthias – violin
- Phil Parnell – piano
- Jim Mullen – guitar
- Dave Green – double bass
- Paul Clarvis – drums
