= Goodbye Swingtime =

Studio album by the Matthew Herbert Big Band
- Released: 19 May 2003
- Genre: Electronic, jazz
- Length: 58:26
- Label: Accidental Records
- Producer: Matthew Herbert

The Matthew Herbert Big Band chronology
Goodbye Swingtime (2003)	There's Me and There's You (2008)

Professional ratings
Review scores
Source	Rating
Exclaim!	favorable
Pitchfork	7.6/10
PopMatters	mixed
San Francisco Bay Guardian	favorable

Goodbye Swingtime is the first studio album by the Matthew Herbert Big Band. It was released on Accidental Records in 2003.

== Critical reception ==
Mark Richardson of Pitchfork gave the album a 7.6 out of 10, calling it "a highly original and engaging record that's also one of the last things one would expect for a producer who made his name with house music." Marshall Bowden of PopMatters said, "Goodbye Swingtime is both interesting and innovative, but somehow it just doesn't allow the listener to connect emotionally with either the big band side or the electronic side of the project."

== Track listing ==
No.	Title	Length
1.	"Turning Pages"	7:45
2.	"Everything's Changed"	4:44
3.	"Fiction"	4:14
4.	"The Three W's"	5:55
5.	"Chromoshop"	5:50
6.	"The Battle"	4:58
7.	"Misprints"	6:13
8.	"The Many and the Few"	5:01
9.	"Simple Mind"	5:20
10.	"Stationary"	8:29

== Charts ==
Chart	Peak position
UK Independent Albums (OCC)	26
UK Jazz & Blues Albums (OCC)	6
