= Scale (album) =

Studio album by Herbert
- Released: 29 May 2006
- Recorded: November 2005
- Studio: Abbey Road Studios
- Genre: Electronic
- Length: 51:26
- Label: Studio !K7
- Producer: Matthew Herbert

Herbert chronology
Secondhand Sounds (2002)	Scale (2006)	The Shakes (2015)

Singles from Scale
- 1. "Moving Like a Train" Released: 2006; 2. "Harmonise" / "The Movers and the Shakers" Released: 2006

Scale is a studio album by British electronic musician Herbert. It was released via Studio !K7 on 29 May 2006.

Scale peaked at number 24 on the UK Independent Albums Chart and number 20 on the Billboard Top Dance/Electronic Albums chart.

== Production ==
According to the liner notes, 635 objects were used to create the album. These include traditional instruments, such as violins and guitars, as well as other objects, such as breakfast cereal, gas pumps and coffins.

== Critical reception ==
Professional ratings
Aggregate scores
Source	Rating
Metacritic	81/100
Review scores
Source	Rating
AllMusic	4.5/5 stars
The A.V. Club	B+
Entertainment Weekly	B+
The Guardian	4/5 stars
MusicOMH	5/5 stars
Pitchfork	8.8/10
PopMatters	8/10
Q	4/5 stars
Resident Advisor	4.0/5
Uncut	3/5 stars

At Metacritic, which assigns a weighted average score out of 100 to reviews from mainstream critics, Scale received an average score of 81% based on 20 reviews, indicating "universal acclaim".

Pitchfork placed Scale at number 35 on the "Top 50 Albums of 2006" list. "Something Isn't Right" was ranked at number 17 on Pitchfork's "Top 100 Tracks of 2006" list.

== Track listing ==
No.	Title	Length
1.	"Something Isn't Right"	3:45
2.	"The Movers and the Shakers"	4:15
3.	"Moving Like a Train"	5:53
4.	"Harmonise"	5:39
5.	"We're in Love"	4:43
6.	"Birds of a Feather"	5:05
7.	"Those Feelings"	4:23
8.	"Down"	6:12
9.	"Movie Star"	4:14
10.	"Just Once"	6:15
11.	"Wrong"	1:02

2013 Special Edition extras:

No.	Title	Length
12.	"Moving Like A Train (Smith N Hack Remix)"	7:31
13.	"Something Isn't Right (Asshot Remix by Cassh)"	3:43
14.	"Harmonise (Freaks Vocal)"	6:29
15.	"Harmonise (A Cappella)"	5:17
16.	"Moving Like A Train (Lidell's Radio Raw Hymn Remix)"	3:44
17.	"Harmonise (Freaks Dub)"	4:22
18.	"Harmonise (TNT's Elevate Mix)"	8:06
19.	"The Movers And The Shakers (Instrumental)"	4:14
20.	"The Movers And The Shakers (Green Velvet Remix)"	7:11
21.	"The Movers And The Shakers (A Cappella)"	3:52
22.	"Birds of a Feather (Abbey Road Version)"	5:01
23.	"We're In Love (Abbey Road Version)"	4:14
24.	"Movie Star (Abbey Road Version)"	4:10
25.	"Down (Abbey Road Version)"	6:08
26.	"Flames (Instrumental Abbey Road Version)"	5:44

== Charts ==
Chart (2006)	Peak position
UK Independent Albums (OCC)	24
US Top Dance/Electronic Albums (Billboard)	20
