= Sage Fruit Company =

Marketing firm

Sage Fruit Company is located in Yakima, WA. It is a sales and marketing firm that specialize in fresh apples, pears and cherries. The growers of Sage Fruit Company have been serving consumers worldwide for multiple generations. Sage Fruit growers farm several thousand acres of orchards throughout the state of Washington, as well as parts of Oregon. Sage Fruit closed in 2025.

== Origins ==
The origins of Sage Fruit Company are rooted in the rich history of immigrant families who came to the fertile Yakima Valley to farm. They found the climate ideally suited for growing tree fruits. During the 1900s, these families decided to take their operations to the next level; they built packing facilities to complement their orchard businesses.

== Ownership ==
Four family businesses from Central Washington own Sage Fruit Company. These family businesses include Valley Fruit and Valicoff Fruit both in Wapato, Olympic Fruit in Moxee and Larson Fruit in Selah. Valley Fruit and Larson Fruit recently combined their packing operations and formed Legacy Fruit Packers in Wapato. While Sage Fruit is made up of families who came to Yakima long ago, the sales and marketing company itself began operations in 1999 when the grower-shipper families decided it would be beneficial to join forces in order to provide consistent year-round supplies to customers.

== Present Day ==
Today, Sage Fruit Company supplies fruit to retailers nationwide, as well as to Asia, Europe, South America, Mexico and Canada.
