= Puzzle (artist) =

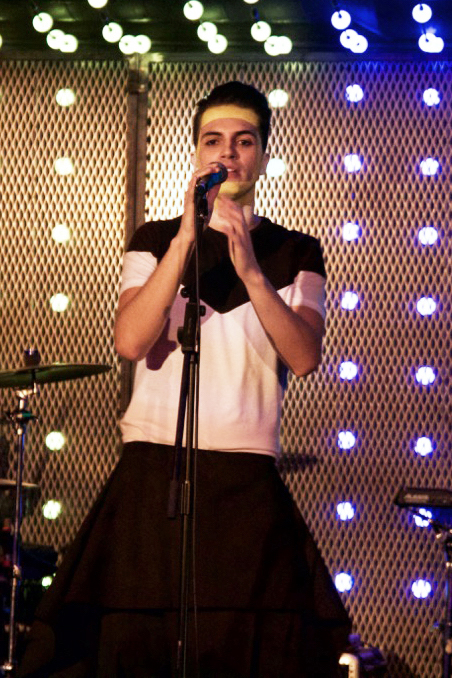
- PUZZLE performing live at The Camden Assembly, London on December 13th 2016

Background information
- Born: Belo Horizonte, Brazil
- Genres: Electropop
- Occupations: Singer-songwriter
- Instruments: Vocals
- Years active: 2015–present

Puzzle (styled PUZZLE) is the stage name of London & Brighton based singer-songwriter Alberto Diniz (born in Belo Horizonte, Brazil). The sound and style of his music is inspired by 1980s electronic synth pop.

Puzzle first emerged on the music scene in November 2015 with debut single "Godlike". Second single "Trial by Fire" followed in March 2016. The single "Comedown" was released in July 2016.

In March 2017 Puzzle released his first EP "Babylon". The four track EP was preceded by the single "Little Black Book" and also included tracks "Kamikaze","Eyes Wide Shut" and "Realign", the latter of which was named Track of the Day on BBC Introducing The South and featured on Tom Robinson's "Fresh on the Net".

Diniz grew up in a religious family in Belo Horizonte, Brazil. As a teenager he sang in a gospel choir with whom he recorded albums and toured Europe. He moved to London when he was 18.

Puzzle music videos often feature computer generated or virtual reality effects. He often appears on stage and in interviews with markings on his face. He has performed live in London several times and supported artists including Bright Light Bright Light and The Sound of Arrows Remixers of Puzzle tracks have included Matthew Herbert.
