= Matthew Herbert =

British electronic musician

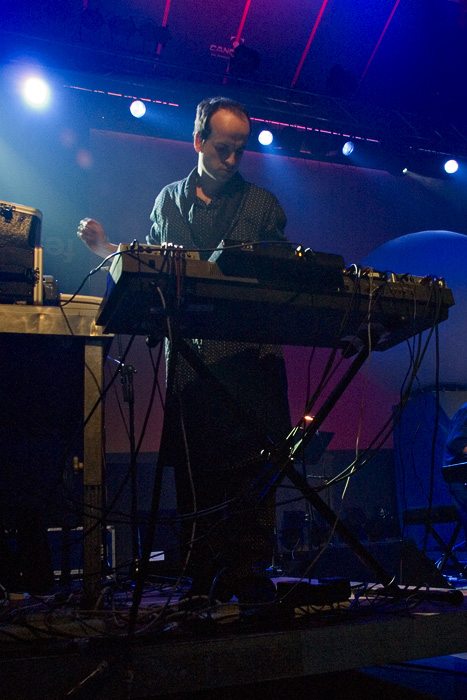
- Herbert in 2006

Background information
- Also known as: Herbert; Doctor Rockit; Radio Boy; Mr. Vertigo; Transformer; Wishmountain; DJ Empty
- Born: 1972 (age 53–54)
- Genres: Electronic, microhouse, musique concrète, jazz, classical, downtempo
- Occupations: DJ, producer, composer
- Years active: 1995–present
- Labels: Accidental, Studio !K7, Peacefrog, Antiphon, Phono, Phonography, Evolution, Tresor, Clear, Lifelike, Caroline International
- Website: matthewherbert.com

Matthew Herbert (born in 1972), also known as Herbert, Doctor Rockit, Radio Boy, Mr. Vertigo, Transformer, Wishmountain, and DJ Empty, is a British electronic musician. He often takes sounds from everyday items to produce electronic music.

== Career ==
Matthew Herbert released his first album, 100 Lbs, in 1996, which “gathers early 12″s from a time when Herbert was very much a ‘dance music’ producer”. In 1998, Herbert issued Around the House with Dani Siciliano, which mixed dance beats, sounds generated by everyday kitchen objects, and vocals. By the late 90's, Herbert was remixing tracks for dance artists like Moloko, Motorbass, Alter Ego, and others. (Many of these were later collected on Secondhand Sounds: Herbert Remixes.) He also recorded singles, EPs, and albums under a variety of aliases (Doctor Rockit, Radio Boy, Mr. Vertigo, and Transformer) as well as his own name.

In 2001, Herbert issued Bodily Functions. Similar in structure to Around the House, it featured sounds generated by manipulating human hair and skin as well as internal bodily organs. Bodily Functions benefited a record deal with Studio !K7, making it Herbert's first full-length work to receive worldwide distribution.

Goodbye Swingtime, a 2003 album issued under the name The Matthew Herbert Big Band, combined the political commentary of Radio Boy with the song structure of his Herbert albums. Recorded with sixteen musicians from the British jazz world, including saxophonists Dave O'Higgins and Nigel Hitchcock, pianist Phil Parnell, and bassist Dave Green, the band is complemented on stage by Siciliano, Arto Lindsay, Warp recording artist Jamie Lidell, and Mara Carlyle.

In 2005, he released a record entitled Plat du Jour, a record made entirely from objects and situations in the food chain. He recorded beneath the sewers of Fleet Street, with Vietnamese coffee beans, inside industrial chicken farms, drove a tank over a recreation of the dinner that Nigella Lawson cooked for George Bush and Tony Blair, and recorded 3500 people biting an apple at the same time. The track entitled "The Final Meal of Stacey Lawton" was made in collaboration with renowned chef Heston Blumenthal.

On 30 May 2006, Herbert issued Scale, his most successful album to date. In the US, it reached number 20 on Billboard's electronic music album chart. Entertainment Weekly remarked, "Herbert sneakily subverts Scale's apocalyptic thematic thread into something warm and danceable." Online magazine Pitchfork Media noted, "Sophisticated and whimsical, joyful and yet tinged with sadness, Scale is one of this year's great albums."

The second album by The Matthew Herbert Big Band, There's Me And There's You, was released in October 2008. In the making of the record Herbert recorded inside the Houses of Parliament, at a landfill site, and in the lobby of the British Museum with 70 volunteers.

In 2009 Matthew Herbert was involved in the 2009 Eurovision Song Contest. He wrote and produced the music accompanying the 42 "postcards," short films introducing the country being represented next. In addition, Herbert wrote an orchestral piece for an interval act involving two "children flying in on a giant plastic swan."

In 2010 Matthew Herbert released two of a three part trilogy of albums. The first, One One, was entirely written and performed by Herbert alone, the second, One Club, was made exclusively out of sounds recorded at the Robert Johnson nightclub in Offenbach in Germany on one night.

That same year he also released a reworking of Mahler's tenth symphony for the Deutsche Grammophon's Recomposed series. Much of the recording was made inside Mahler's composing hut in Toblach, by his graveside and in a crematorium.

In late 2011, the final part of the trilogy, One Pig, was released. Herbert recorded the life cycle of a farmed pig from birth to the dinner plate. The animal rights organisation PETA condemned the album when it was announced without hearing it. Herbert, who is not a vegetarian, responded that their complaints were "utterly absurd" and that he wanted his music to encourage people to "listen to the world a little more carefully." In the same year his 2001 track "Café de Flore", originally recorded for a Yves St Laurent fashion show and named after the Café de Flore in Paris, was featured prominently in the soundtrack of the film Café de Flore.

In August 2012, Meaningless was released under the pseudonym DJ Empty. The album was an experiment to see if war samples could be disguised in the form of dance music, making it a conceptual precursor to Matthew Herbert's The End of Silence (2013), which openly acknowledges the central focus on an audio sample from the Raid on Ras Lanuf.

On 11 March 2013 a newly commissioned work by Herbert, for orchestra with electronics, based on a work by Rameau, was performed at The Roundhouse in London, as part of BBC Radio 3's "Baroque Remixed" series.

In March 2013, his first five albums under moniker Herbert were released as Herbert Complete featuring bonus material and Abbey Road Sessions. Initially it was an iTunes Store (now Apple Music) exclusive (and subsequently released for streaming on Spotify too), but has never been sold in lossless physically or digitally.

On 20 March 2015 Herbert announced The Shakes, his first album of dance music in nine years. This was followed up with the release of "Middle," the first track from the album. The Shakes was released in an innovative way, making one track and short accompanying film available on streaming and video platforms each week leading up to the album release.

On 22 October 2021 Herbert released the album Musca on Accidental Records.

In October 2023 Herbert received an Ivor Novello Award nomination at The Ivors Classical Awards. Estuary Sound Ark, a community project involving young participants and sounds collected by the local community in South Essex and North Kent was nominated for the Best Community and Participation Composition.

Herbert was awarded the Ivor Novello Award for Innovation, presented in association with the Musicians' Union, at The Ivors Classical Awards 2023. The award acknowledged his outstanding contribution to music.

In October 2024 Herbert received another Ivor Novello Award nomination at The Ivors Classical Awards. The Horse, for orchestra, horse skeleton and electronics, was nominated for Best Large Ensemble Composition. Herbert went on to win the Ivor Novello Award on 12 November 2024.

== Theories and politics ==
In 2000, Herbert wrote a manifesto titled Personal Contract for the Composition of Music (Incorporating the Manifest of Mistakes), which served as a theoretical guide for much of his later work. Its goals include a personal ban on using drum machines and pre-existing samples, and ensuring that anything created in the studio can be replicated in live performance.

Many of his less dance-oriented projects (chiefly those not recorded under the name Herbert) address political concerns, using specific objects to create a conceptual piece. His 2001 project as Radio Boy, The Mechanics of Destruction sampled McDonald's and The Gap merchandise as a protest against corporate globalism. It was made available as a free MP3 download, via concerts and by post from Accidental Records.

In 2005, Herbert released the album Plat du Jour under his real name, Matthew Herbert. The disc addresses commercial food production and marketing.

In February 2006, Herbert helped form the virtual community Country X. In an introduction posted on the website, he writes, "Why not start a country? only this time, a virtual one. free from the necessity to defend its borders physically, we can reduce the violence of exclusion. a new description of resistance."

Herbert shared some of his thoughts on the future in a 2010 article for the UK music magazine Clash, writing "we are facing a perfect storm of shit: global financial meltdown, massive climatic shifts and the end of oil."

== Accidental Records ==
By 2000 Herbert assembled several microlabels he initiated, including Soundslike (for his Herbert alias) and Lifelike (originally called Lowlife, begun in 1998 for his Doctor Rockit alias), under the umbrella Accidental Records. In addition to documenting Herbert's sundry projects, these imprints issued works from The Soft Pink Truth, Mara Carlyle, Mugison, and Beckett & Taylor, among others. Between 2008 and 2009, the label released 'Butterflies' by Finn Peters, the sophomore record of Matthew Herbert Big Band named There's Me And There's You, The Invisible's debut album, Setsubun Bean Unit, and Micachu's debut named Jewellery.

2010/2011 sees the release of a trilogy concept album by Herbert, beginning with One One, followed by One Club and One Pig.

Hejira's debut album Prayer Before Birth was released on the label on 21 October 2013.

== Additional projects ==
Matthew Herbert has produced remixes for numerous artists, including Moloko, Ennio Morricone, Quincy Jones, PUZZLE, Björk, REM, Perry Farrell, Serge Gainsbourg, Yoko Ono, John Cale, The Avalanches and Cornelius. He programmed three tracks on Björk's Vespertine, and produced The Invisible's debut album, along with Moloko singer Róisín Murphy's album Ruby Blue. He has also produced albums for Micachu, Merz and Finn Peters.

He has contributed music to several films, including La confiance règne, Human Traffic, Dogme 95, director Kristian Levring's The Intended, Agathe Cléry, Le Défi (Dance Challenge), A Number, as well as UK television, theatrical and concert dance productions.

Herbert also wrote music for the YouTube documentary film Life in a Day along with prominent composer Harry Gregson-Williams.

In 2010 he produced a new project at the invitation of London Sinfonietta called One Day in which he set to music a Saturday edition of the Guardian newspaper, performed at London's Southbank Centre in the London Jazz Festival. He went on to create a short encore for the ensemble involving a live remix of a concert at the BBC Proms in 2012 using recordings on mobile phones.

In 2012 he is relaunching the museum of sound at www.museumofsound.com.

Also in 2012, he was appointed as the creative director of the newly revived BBC Radiophonic Workshop.

Herbert wrote the score for the 2017 film A Fantastic Woman, which was released by Milan Records in January 2018. He also wrote the score for Disobedience, released in 2017/2018 by the same director, Sebastián Lelio.

In February 2018, the current Doctor Who logo was revealed in a short video clip, with music and sound created by Herbert.

== Discography ==
=== Herbert ===
Albums

- 100lbs (1996)
- Parts One Two and Three (1996)
- Parts Remixed (1996)
- Around the House (1998)
- Bodily Functions (2001)
- Secondhand Sounds (2002)
- Scale (2006)
- The Shakes (2015)
- Musca (2021)
- Clay (2025), with Momoko Gill

EPs

- Birds (1996)
- Part One (1996)
- Part Two (1996)
- Part Three (1996)
- Part Four (1996)
- Part Five (1996)
- Classic Herbert (1996)
- The Antioch Bypass EP (1997)
- So Now... (1998)
- We All Need Love (1998)
- The Last Beat (1999)
- Suddenly (2000)
- Leave Me Now (2000)
- The Audience (2001)
- Addiction (2002)
- Moving like a Train (2006)
- Puzzles EP (2007)
- Bodily Functions Remixes (2012)
- Part Six (2014)
- Part Seven (2014)
- Part Eight (2015)
- Part Nine (2024)

=== Matthew Herbert ===
Albums

- Letsallmakemistakes (2000)
- Plat du Jour (2005)
- Score (2007)
- Mahler Symphony X (2010)
- One One (2010)
- One Club (2010)
- One Pig (2011)
- The End of Silence (2013)
- The Recording (2014)
- A Nude - The Perfect Body (2016)
- A Fantastic Woman (2017)
- Disobedience (2017)
- Gloria Bell (2018)
- The Wonder (2022)
- The Horse (2023)
- Starve Acre (2024)

EPs

- On Your Feet (2004)
- Plat du Jour: The Appetiser EP (2005)

=== Doctor Rockit ===
Albums

- The Music of Sound (1996)
- Indoor Fireworks (2000)
- The Unnecessary History of Doctor Rockit (2004)

EPs

- Ready to Rockit EP (1995)
- Whoosh (1996)
- D for Doctor (1996)
- Café De Flore (2001)
- Veselka's Diner (2003)
- The Vinyl Resting Place (2004)

=== The Matthew Herbert Big Band ===
Albums

- Goodbye Swingtime (2003)
- There's Me and There's You (2008)
- The State Between Us (2019)

EPs

- The Process, the Parts, the Many and the Few (2003)
- You’re Welcome Here (Brexit Edition) (2021)

=== Radio Boy ===
Albums

- Wishmountain Is Dead, Long Live Radio Boy (1997)
- The Mechanics of Destruction (2001)

EPs

- The Lift Attendants Holiday (1998)
- London (1999)
- A Machine Drilling for Oil (2000)
- Rude Workouts (2003)

=== Wishmountain ===
Albums

- Wishmountain Is Dead (1998)
- Tesco (2012)
- Stonework: 1000 Metres Down (2022)

EPs

- Radio (1996)
- Video (1996)
- Wishmountain (1998)
- Radio 2 (1998)
- Old Stuff (1998)
- Nescafe (2012)
- Dairy Milk (2012)

=== DJ Empty ===
Albums

- Meaningless (2012)
