= The Invisible (album) =

Studio album by the Invisible
- Released: 9 March 2009
- Recorded: 2007–2009
- Genre: Art rock, experimental rock
- Label: Accidental Records
- Producer: Matthew Herbert

The Invisible chronology
The Invisible (2009)	Rispah (2012)

Professional ratings
Review scores
Source	Rating
BBC Music	Favourable link
MusicOMH	2009
The Quietus	Very Favourable

The Invisible is the debut album by the Invisible, released on 9 March 2009, on Matthew Herbert's label, Accidental Records in the UK, and was produced by Herbert. London based singer Eska features as backing vocalist for all tracks apart from "In Retrograde", "London Girl" and "Spiral".

== Reception ==
The album was nominated for the 2009 Mercury Music Prize.

The band received general praise for its first records, receiving 4 out of 5 stars from music magazines Q and Mojo.

iTunes awarded the album its 'Album of the Year' award.

== Track listing ==
1. "In Retrograde" (2:41)
2. "Constant" (5:11)
3. "Passion" (3:56)
4. "London Girl" (4:00)
5. "Babydoll" (4:15)
6. "Monster's Waltz" (3:49)
7. "OK" (4:15)
8. "Jacob & The Angel" (4:51)
9. "Climate" (5:08)
10. "Tally of Souls" (3:16)
11. "Spiral" (3:26)
12. "Time Waits" (3:39)

== Personnel ==
The Invisible

- Dave Okumu — lead vocals, electric guitar; piano (tracks 1, 8), butler's bell (track 1), pedal steel guitar (tracks 3, 4), bass (tracks 4, 5, 7, 10), synthesizer (tracks 8, 9), programming (track 10), string arrangements (tracks 1, 11)
- Tom Herbert — bass (1–3, 6, 8, 9, 11, 12), piano (track 1), double bass (tracks 1, 11), harmonium (tracks 3, 11), synthesizer (tracks 2, 7, 8), acoustic guitar (track 3), electric guitar (track 4), hunting horn (track 11)
- Leo Taylor — drums (tracks 2–5, 7–10, 12), electronic percussion (track 4), drum programming (tracks 7, 9)

Additional Personnel

- Eska — backing vocals (tracks 1–3, 5–10, 12), vocal arrangements (tracks 3, 5–8)
- Julian Ferraretto — violin (tracks 1, 11), viola (tracks 1, 11)
- Tom Skinner — drums (tracks 1, 6, 11), synthesizer (track 6), bookcase and lampshade (track 7)
- Eska — backing vocals (tracks 1–3, 5–10, 12), vocal arrangements racks 3, 5–8)
