= DJ-Kicks: Tiga =

DJ-KiCKS: Tiga

Compilation album by Tiga
- Released: December 1, 2002
- Recorded: 2002
- Genre: Electronica, electro, new wave
- Length: 72:40
- Label: Studio !K7 !K7142CD (CD)
- Producer: Tiga

Tiga chronology
| DJ-KiCKS: Tiga (2002) | Sexor (2006) |

DJ-Kicks chronology
| Playgroup (2002) | Tiga (2002) | Chicken Lips (2003) |

Professional ratings
Review scores
| Source | Rating |
|---|---|
| AllMusic | 4/5 stars |
| Chart | (Favorable) |
| Eye Weekly | 2.5/5 stars |
| JIVE Magazine | 5/5 stars |
| Paris Voice | (Favorable) |
| Pitchfork | (8.2/10) |
| PopMatters | (Favorable) |

DJ-KiCKS: Tiga is a DJ mix album, compiled and mixed by Montreal DJ and record producer, Tiga. It is the twentieth installment of the DJ-KiCKS series, all of which are released by the Studio !K7 Independent Record Label.

The compilation focuses on the electro/electroclash movement, including remixes from Detroit-based ADULT. and dance-punk producers The DFA. The final track of the album is a cover of Felix Da Housecat's "Madame Hollywood", performed by Tiga himself.

A re-release of this compilation has also included Tiga's cover of Nelly's "Hot in Herre", placed between tracks 4 and 5.

The Red Zone remix of Adventures of Stevie V's "Dirty Cash (Money Talks)" (track number 14) only appeared on initial UK promotional cds and was omitted from all commercially available editions of this album.

== Track listing ==
1. "Radio Jolly" (ADULT. Remix) – Jollymusic – 2:24
2. "You're So Gangsta" (Playgroup Instrumental) – Chromeo – 4:05
3. "Ich Und Elaine" (2raumwohnung Club mix) – 2raumwohnung – 2:24
4. "The Big Fake" – Traffic Signs – 1:44
5. "You (Vocal)" – Tutto Matto – 2:39
6. "She Male" (Black Strobe Remix) – Sir Drew – 3:10
7. "Deceptacon" (The DFA Remix) – Le Tigre – 4:08
8. "...So" – Soft Cell – 2:24
9. "Dubby Disco" – Antonelli Electr. – 3:51
10. "Sacrifice" – Break 3000 – 3:53
11. "Dying in Beauty" – Tiga & Zyntherius – 1:34
12. "Time Has Changed" – Codec & Flexor – 1:57
13. "Devices" – Carl A. Finlow – 3:23
14. "Dirty Cash" (Red Zone Mix) – Adventures of Stevie V. –
15. "Rather Be" – Crowdpleaser & St. Plomb (Featuring Selfish in Bed) – 1:34
16. "Shake A Leg" – Water Lily & St. Plomb – 4:21
17. "Unconditional Discipline of the Bastard Prince" – Volga Select – 1:13
18. "Lowrider" – Off Pop – 2:43
19. "Home Again" – M.A.N.D.Y. – 3:12
20. "Mispent Years" – Schatrax – 1:29
21. "Man Hrdina" (DJ Kicks) – Tiga – 2:43
22. "Ikea" – Swayzak – 2:43
23. "Bang Bang Lover" (Dance Mix) – Charles Manier – 2:43
24. "Biggest Fan" (Black Strobe Mix) – Märtini Brös. – 4:38
25. "Madame Hollywood" (Mr. Hollywood Version) – Tiga – 6:48

== Personnel ==
- Adult. – Remixing
- Black Strobe – Producer, Remixing
- Josh Brent – Producer
- Crowd Pleaser – Producer
- Louis Dufort – Mastering
- Jori Hulkkonen – Producer
- Inga Humpe – Lyricist
- Trevor Jackson – Mixing, Reproduction
- Matt Murphy – Producer
- Tiga – Producer, Compilation, Editing, Mixing
- 2raumwohnung – Performer
- Mark Vogel – Photography
