= Movements (album) =

Studio album by Booka Shade
- Released: 16 May 2006
- Genres: Electronic, tech house, downtempo, minimal
- Length: 62:45
- Label: Get Physical
- Producer: Booka Shade

Booka Shade chronology
Memento (2004)	Movements (2006)	DJ-Kicks: Booka Shade (2007)

Singles from Movements
- 1. "Body Language" Released: 2005; 2. "Mandarine Girl" Released: 2005; 3. "Darko" Released: 2006; 4. "In White Rooms" Released: 2006; 5. "Night Falls" Released: 2006

Movements is the second studio album by German electronic music duo Booka Shade, released on 16 May 2006 on Get Physical Music.

== Critical reception ==
Professional ratings
Review scores
Source	Rating
The Guardian	4/5 stars
Mojo	3/5 stars
Pitchfork	8.6/10
PopMatters	7/10
Resident Advisor	4.5/5
Stylus Magazine	B+

Pitchfork placed Movements at number 50 on its list of the top 50 albums of 2006.

== Track listing ==
All tracks are written by Booka Shade, except where noted.

No.	Title	Writer(s)	Length
1.	"Night Falls"		5:20
2.	"Body Language (Interpretation)"	Booka Shade; DJ Pat Bo; Phil D. Young	5:00
3.	"Paper Moon"		5:12
4.	"The Birds and the Beats / At the Window"		5:21
5.	"Darko"		6:12
6.	"Pong Pang"		5:51
7.	"Mandarine Girl" (album version)		5:43
8.	"Take a Ride"		4:03
9.	"Wasting Time"		5:06
10.	"In White Rooms"		5:27
11.	"Hallelujah USA"	Booka Shade; M. Walter	2:06
12.	"Lost High"		4:40
