= Black Strobe =

French musical group

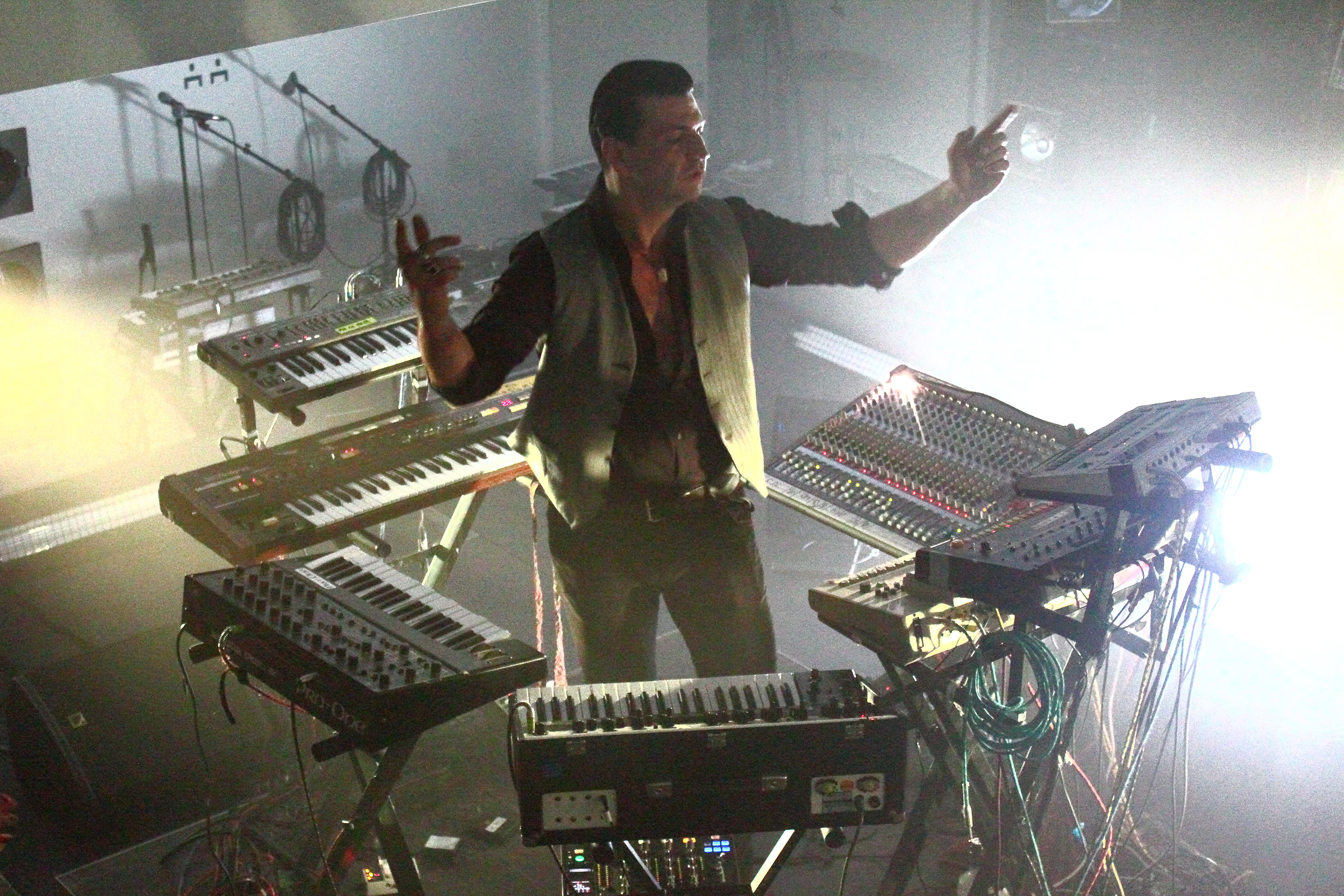
- Arnaud Rebotini, the band's frontman, performing in 2013

Background information
- Origin: Paris, France
- Genres: Electro; electronic rock; electroclash; house; EBM
- Years active: 1997–present
- Labels: Black Strobe; Playlouder; Output; Supersoul
- Members: Arnaud Rebotini; Mathieu Zub; Benjamin Beaulieu
- Past members: Ivan Smagghe; David "Siskid" Shaw; Bastien Burger

Black Strobe (sometimes Blackstrobe) is an electroclash group formed in Paris in 1997 by record producer Arnaud Rebotini and DJ Ivan Smagghe. They were instrumental in the rise of the electroclash movement in the UK with their breakthrough single "Me and Madonna". Originally producing in the house genre, they later became more influenced by music from the 1970s and 1980s, especially industrial post punk and European electronic body music. They describe their sound as "frozen balearic gay biker house". They are heavily influenced by acts such as Cabaret Voltaire, Nitzer Ebb, Front 242, and Depeche Mode.

The group's members are in high demand as remixers, and worked with such diverse artists as Röyksopp, Nitzer Ebb, Rammstein, The Rapture, and Tiefschwarz. Ivan Smagghe left in 2006 as Black Strobe expanded to a four-piece live band, with members David "Siskid" Shaw (guitar), Bastien Burger (bass and keyboard), and Benjamin Beaulieu (drums) joining Rebotini on vocals. Smagghe was contributing lyrics before his departure. They released their debut album Burn Your Own Church in 2007.

Two songs from Burn Your Own Church have appeared in other forms of media. "I'm A Man" appeared in the 2008 film RocknRolla, the 2009 film Le Mac, and the second episode of the AMC series The Walking Dead. It was also copied without permission and used in the 2010 Bollywood film Once Upon a Time in Mumbai. "Shining Bright Star" was featured in the Assassin's Creed: Brotherhood multiplayer launch trailer. In 2013, their track "Boogie in Zero Gravity" was featured on Radio Mirror Park in Rockstar Games' Grand Theft Auto V.

In 2009, after remixing other music artists' tracks, Black Strobe released the EP Back From Beyond, which was accompanied in early 2010 by a video directed by Laurent Chanez, whom the group had met in 2004 through the Groupe de Recherches Musicales (GRM).

== Discography ==
=== Singles ===
- Paris Acid City (Source Records 1997)
- Innerstrings (Output Recordings 2000)
- Me And Madonna (Output Recordings 2002)
- Italian Fireflies (Kitsuné Music 2003)
- Deceive/Play (Blackstrobe Records 2005)
- Last Dub On Earth (Crosstown Rebels 2006)
- Black Metal (Playlouderecordings 2007)
- I'm A Man (Playlouderecordings 2007)
- Shining Bright Star (Playlouderecordings 2007)
- Blood Shot Eyes (Playlouderecordings 2013)

=== EPs and studio albums ===
- Chemical Sweet Girl EP (Output Records 2004)
- Shining Bright Star EP (Playlouderecordings 2006)
- Me & Madonna EP (Kitsune 2010)
*A Remix Selection LP (Playlouderecordings 2006)
  1. Shining Bright Star (Phones Industrial Mix)
  2. Tiefschwarz - Ghost Track - 2003
  3. Märtini Brös - The Biggest Fan - 2002
  4. The Rapture - Sister Saviour - 2003
  5. Depeche Mode - Something To Do (Alt. Remix) - 2004
  6. David Carretta, The Hacker, Millimetric - Moscow Reisen - 2003
  7. Bloc Party - Like Eating Glass - 2005
  8. Dominatrix - Dominatrix Sleeps Tonight - 2003
  9. Rammstein - Keine Lust - 2004
  10. Sweet Light - Abusator - 2005
*Burn Your Own Church LP (Playlouderecordings 2007)
  1. Brenn Di Ega Kjerke
  2. Shining Bright Star
  3. Girl Next Door
  4. Blood Shot Eyes
  5. Not What You Need
  6. I'm A Man
  7. Lady 13
  8. You Should Be
  9. Buzz Buzz Buzz
  10. Last Club On Earth
  11. Crave For Speed
*Back From Beyond (Supersoul Recordings 2009)
  1. Back From Beyond
  2. Demonstration Track
*Godforsaken Roads LP (Blackstrobe Records 2014)
  1. Broken Phone Blues
  2. Monkey Glands
  3. He Keeps on Calling Me
  4. Blues Fight
  5. For Those Who Came on Earth Thru The Devil's Asshole
  6. Folsom Prison Blues
  7. Swamp Fever
  8. House of Good Lovin'
  9. Dumped Boogie
  10. From the Gutter
  11. Going Back Home
  12. Boogie in Zero Gravity
  13. Promised Moon
  14. The Girl From the Bayou

=== Remixes ===
- 2001 Playgroup - "Number One"
- 2002 Cosmo Vitelli - "Robot Soul"
- 2002 Märtini Brös - "The Biggest Fan"
- 2002 Justin Robertson presents Revtone - "Everpresent"
- 2002 Sir Drew - "Shemale"
- 2002 W.I.T. - "Hold Me, Touch Me"
- 2002 Rammstein - "Mutter" (cancelled)
- 2003 Dominatrix - "The Dominatrix Sleeps Tonight"
- 2003 The Hacker, Millimetric & David Carretta - "Moskow Reise"
- 2003 The Rapture - "Sister Saviour"
- 2003 Röyksopp - "Eple"
- 2003 Tiefschwarz - "Ghostrack"
- 2003 Tones on Tail - "Means of Escape"
- 2004 Alexkid - "Pick It Up"
- 2004 Alter Ego - "Rocker"
- 2004 Dave Clarke - "What Was Her Name?"
- 2004 Depeche Mode - "Something to Do"
- 2004 David Guetta - "The World Is Mine"
- 2004 Oscar - "Loa"
- 2004 Rammstein - "Keine Lust"
- 2004 Sweet Exorcist - "Test Four"
- 2005 Bloc Party - "Like Eating Glass"
- 2005 Fischerspooner - "Never Win"
- 2005 The Hacker - "Flesh & Bone"
- 2005 White Rose Movement - "Love Is a Number"
- 2005 Sweet Light - "Abusator"
- 2006 Nitzer Ebb - "Getting Closer"
- 2007 Olga Kouklaki - "Getalife"
- 2007 Vive La Fête - "La Route"
- 2007 The Neon Judgement - "13.13"
- 2007 The Penelopes - "Demian"
- 2008 Ayumi hamasaki - "About You"
- 2010 Lindstrom & Christabelle - "Baby can't Stop (Tsugi mix)"
- 2010 Acid Washed - "General Motors, Detroit, America"
- 2010 tape to tape - "pure & easy"
- 2010 Majeure - "The Dresden Codex"
- 2010 Taxi Girl - "Chercher le garçon"
- 2010 The Toxic Avenger - "Angst: One"
- 2011 Turzi Electronic Experience - "Connaissance"
- 2011 The Subs - "Decontrol"
