= Booka Shade =

German house music duo

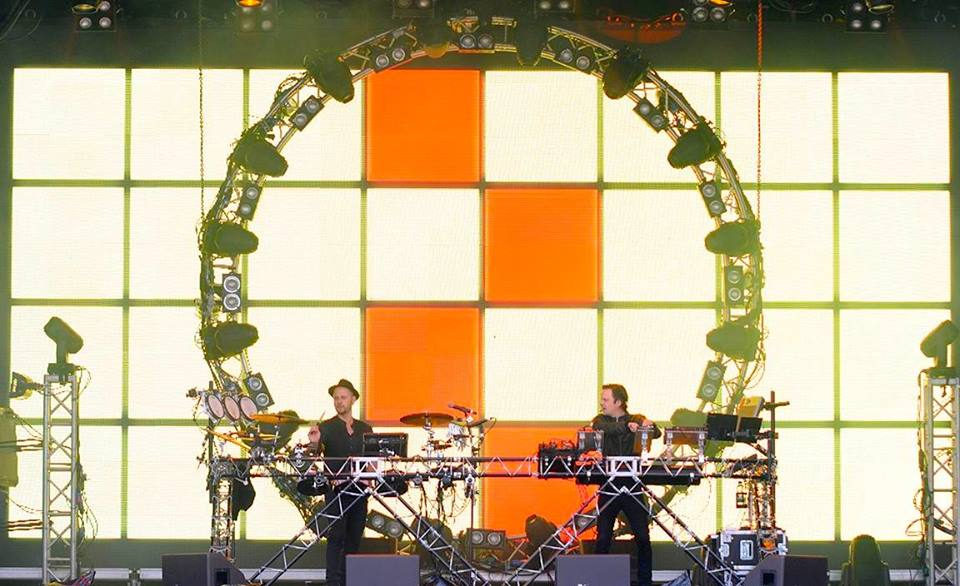
- Booka Shade at Forbidden Fruit Festival in 2015

Background information
- Origin: Frankfurt am Main, Hesse, Germany
- Genres: House, tech house, minimal
- Years active: 2004–present
- Label: Blaufield Music (2013–Present) Get Physical Records (2002–2013)
- Members: Walter Merziger; Arno Kammermeier
- Website: www.BookaShade.com

Booka Shade is a German house duo. It is made up of Walter Merziger and Arno Kammermeier, described as veterans of the Frankfurt electronic music scene. They have released 10 studio albums, including Memento (2004), Movements (2006), The Sun & the Neon Light (2008), More! (2010), Eve (2013), Galvany Street (2017), Cut the Strings (2018), Dear Future Self (2020), Both (2021), Link To The Invisible (2024), various EPs and a mix album for DJ-Kicks.

== Biography ==
=== History ===
In the early 1990s, the duo made music under the name Planet Claire and released an album of the same name, produced by Peter Hayo. The duo have stated the name Planet Claire came from a B-52's song of the same name.

In 2002, the duo collaborated with DJ T and together with friends Patrick Bodmer and Philipp Jung aka M.A.N.D.Y. established the record label Get Physical. The Get Physical label grew rapidly and quickly became a respected name in electronic music. In 2005, Mixmag voted Get Physical as ‘label of the year’ after it became the best selling label on Beatport across all genres. Artists that released on Get Physical include Trentemoller, Chelonis R.Jones, Damian Lazarus, Modeselektor and Junior Boys amongst many others Booka Shade themselves started to release records on Get Physical Music from 2004.

=== Breakthrough (2004–2006) ===
In 2004 Booka Shade released the album Memento on Get Physical.

Their collaboration with M.A.N.D.Y. then followed, with their single "Body Language" breaking through to a global audience. The track became a club hit, the "Ibiza Track of the Season". and led to Get Physical being awarded ‘Label of the Year" by DJ Magazine. Resident Advisor called the song Body Language "one of the biggest releases of the year.". Body Language has been used as a sample by will.i.am in the song Get Your Money from his album Songs About Girls. It also appears in the video game Forza Motorsport 2 for Xbox 360, as the M.A.N.D.Y. vs Booka Shade version. In 2016 Body Language got sampled again, this time in You Don't Know Me by Jax Jones featuring British singer Raye.

Their follow up single, Mandarine Girl, also gave them great success, to this date it is the best selling record at UK vinyl store Phonica. Their 2005 singles Mandarine Girl and Body Language (with M.A.N.D.Y.) were widely played in clubs. and licensed on many mix CDs.

At the same time, Booka Shade performed dance music live, with shows at Sonar Festival in Barcelona, with Mylo in London and a tour with Röyksopp. Booka Shade also were the opening act of a Depeche Mode concert in Berlin. This led to Resident Advisor awarding Booka Shade the honour of ‘Best Live Act’ in 2006, alongside ‘Best Album’ for their new Movements album.

The next album Movements was released in May 2006 and included the singles ‘Night Falls", "In White Rooms" and "Darko". "In White Rooms" and "Night Falls" were the two best-selling EPs by the German distributor Intergrooves in 2006. The US music site Pitchfork placed "In White Rooms" in their Top 100 tracks of 2006, whilst in Germany the end of year poll by Groove magazine selected Booka Shade to be second best Producers of the year, and Movements as one of their best albums of the year. The song "In White Rooms" was featured on CSI: NY – Season 2 Episode 23.

Booka Shade were featured on BBC Radio 1's Essential Mix on July 2, 2006.

=== 2007 ===
In 2007, Booka Shade toured the world as part of their ‘Movements’ tour, playing 150 shows in almost 20 months. During this time, they released their singles "Tickle / Karma Car" and "Numbers", both of which found international acclaim. The latter was a single from DJ-Kicks compilation, also released in 2007 The album earned high praise, winning "Compilation of the Year" from DJ Mag, and coming second place in the same poll in Mixmag.

=== 2008 ===
In February 2008, Booka Shade released the Movements Tour Edition, which featured the original album plus live versions of the original tracks. The live tracks were recorded at their show at Pukkelpop, Belgium. The album also featured additional remixes by Hot Chip, Elektrochemie and more.

In May 2008, Booka Shade released their third studio album "The Sun & The Neon Light". The album featured 14 tracks, including new versions of ‘Karma Car’ and ‘Planetary’ which had previously been released on Get Physical. "Charlotte" was the lead single from the album, released worldwide on 14 May. Both the album and single were well received in media.

=== 2010–2012 ===
Two years later the duo released their next album ‘More!’ which received positive reviews in Resident Advisor, Pitchfork and Clash Magazine. In 2010 they also played at Red Rocks Amphitheatre in the USA. The More! album was followed by a number of single releases. ‘Home’ was released with M.A.N.D.Y. on Get Physical. In 2012 Steve Aoki's Dim Mak Records released ‘Honeyslave EP’ which included the lead track Honeyslave plus ‘Tomorrow Belongs To Us’ and Booka's club interpretations of both tracks. These tracks also featured on Booka Shade's compilation with Pete Tong ' All Gone Ibiza'. The same year, Booka Shade played a sold-out show at London's Brixton Academy with Leftfield, Laurent Garnier and M.A.N.D.Y. as part of a show to support the charity War Child.

=== 2012–2014 ===
In late 2012, Booka Shade set up a new label imprint called ‘Blaufield Music’ . The track ‘Haleshop’ was given away for free via the band's website and limited edition white-label vinyl was made available to purchase, each of which were hand-stamped. As part of Record Store Day in 2013, they released a limited edition 12" vinyl which featured regular vocalist Chelonis R. Jones. Booka Shade made their Coachella Festival debut in 2013.

On November 1, 2013, the album Eve was released by Embassy Of Music in collaboration with the band's label ’Blaufield’. This included the singles ‘Love Inc’, ‘Crossing Borders’ featuring Fritz Kalkbrenner and ‘Love Drug’ featuring Fritz Helder of Azari & III. The artwork for the album and all singles was designed by La Boca. The band featured on BBC 6Music's '6 Mix' as part of their Christmas Special

In late 2014, Booka Shade released the EP Line of Fire. A new vocal version of the track following in early 2015 featuring the singer Karin Park. As part of the partnership with Karin, Booka Shade remixed her single 'Pandora Drive'. Following these singles, Booka Shade released an EP under the name Booka Shade Presents: Yaruba, which according to the band's SoundCloud "represents the dark and more clubby side of Booka Shade".

== Discography ==
=== Releases ===
Booka Shade have released nine albums of their own material. Arno has commented in several interviews that while Memento was seen as a more minimalist techno album, Movements pushed the boundaries of people's definition of genres, introducing certain vocal and synth sounds unheard of in Memento.

Several Get Physical compilations have been mixed by Booka Shade and involve material from other Get Physical artists.

Booka Shade worked with Pete Tong on his 'All Gone Ibiza' compilation series. They also released a DJ-Kicks album via Studio !K7 in 2007.

=== Albums ===
- 2004 Memento
- 2006-05-12 Movements
- 2007 DJ-Kicks: Booka Shade
- 2008 Movements – The Tour Edition + live DVD
- 2008 The Sun & the Neon Light
- 2010-04-26 More!
- 2013-11-01 Eve
- 2016-10-14 Movements 10
- 2017-04-07 Galvany Street
- 2018-04-06 Cut the Strings
- 2018-06-22 Cut the Strings, Vol.2
- 2020-05-22 Dear Future Self
- 2021-05-21 Booka Shade presents: Voices of Hope
- 2021-11-12 Both
- 2022-10-14 Contour
- 2023-08-04 20 Years Reworked
- 2024-06-07 Link To The Invisible

=== Singles / EPs ===
- 1995 "Kind of Good"
- 1996 "Silk"
- 2004 "Every Day in My Life" (Marc Romboy vs. Booka Shade)
- 2004 "Stupid Questions"
- 2004 "Vertigo / Memento"
- 2005 "Body Language" (M.A.N.D.Y. vs. Booka Shade)
- 2005 "Mandarine Girl"
- 2005 "Memento Album Remixes"
- 2006 "Darko"
- 2006 "In White Rooms"
- 2006 "Night Falls"
- 2006 "Played Runner" (DJ T. vs. Booka Shade)
- 2007 "Body Language" (M.A.N.D.Y. vs. Booka Shade) (remixes)
- 2007 "Tickle / Karma Car"
- 2007 "Numbers (DJ Kicks)"
- 2008 "Charlotte"
- 2008 "Donut" (M.A.N.D.Y. vs. Booka Shade)
- 2010 "Bad Love"
- 2010 "Teenage Spaceman"
- 2010 "Regenerate"
- 2012 "Honeyslave"
- 2013 "Haleshop"
- 2013 "Blackout: White Noise"
- 2013 "Love Inc."
- 2014 "Love Drug"
- 2014 "Line of Fire"
- 2015 "Line of Fire" featuring Karin Park
- 2015 "Yaruba: EP One" Booka Shade Presents: Yaruba
- 2016 "Night Falls"
- 2017 "Babylon"
- 2017 "Loneliest Boy / Just Like Tonight" (Booka Shade with Craig Walker)
- 2017 "Numb the Pain"
- 2017 "Aftermath / Limelight"
- 2018 "Night Surfing / Night Primitives"
- 2018 "Cut The Strings / Karrera 18" (Booka Shade with Troels Abrahamsen)
- 2018 "Papua Beach"
- 2018 "Cut The Strings Vol. 1" (with Claude VonStroke, Yousef and Wes Wieland)
- 2018 "Quantum Leap EP"
- 2018 "Dissonanza"
- 2018 "Sacred / Cyril's Garden"
- 2018 "Rosebud"
- 2019 "I Go, I Go" (Booka Shade with Kaktus Einarsson)
- 2019 "Trespass 2019"
- 2019 "Chemical Release" (with UNDERHER)
- 2019 "The Unseen / Banderas"
- 2019 "Understanding"
- 2019 "Torch / The Highs Are Higher"
- 2020 "Dear Future Self" (Booka Shade with Lazarusman)
- 2020 "Red Medina / Acid Brain"
- 2020 "Perfect in a Way" (Booka Shade with Kaktus Einarsson)
- 2020 "To the Sea" (Booka Shade with Eli & Fur)
- 2020 "Polar Lights (Booka Shade with JOPLYN)
- 2020 "Blaze" (Booka Shade with Jan Blomqvist)
- 2020 "Blaze of Unity - Ep"
- 2020 "O Superman" (Booka Shade with M.A.N.D.Y. and Laurie Anderson)
- 2021 "Pray"
- 2021 "Perpetual Light" (Booka Shade with Polly Scattergood)
- 2021 "Caverna Magica"
- 2021 "St. Kilda Nights" (Booka Shade with Bontan)
- 2021 "Small Talk (Okay)" (Booka Shade with SOHMI)
- 2021 "Follow" (Booka Shade with Felix Raphael)
- 2021 "Hope" (Booka Shade with Joe Killigton)
- 2021 "Essential Chrome"
- 2021 "Heart of Stone"
- 2021 "Call Morpheus"
- 2021 "Infused Reality"
- 2021 "Memories" (Booka Shade with Rashid Ajami)
- 2021 "Drago"
- 2021 "In Avalanche"
- 2021 "1993"
- 2021 "Caprice"
- 2021 "Vertigo (Living Without You") (Booka Shade with Dapayk & Padberg)
- 2022 "Farlo May"
- 2022 "Soulkeeper / The Unseen"
- 2022 "Break the Chains"
- 2022 "Fire & Rain" (Booka Shade with bailey)
- 2022 "Why Can't We Make It Work" (Booka Shade with Laudic)
- 2022 "Encounters"
- 2023 "Circulate (Together)
- 2023 "Twisted Cadence"
- 2023 "Sound Of The Dragonfly"
- 2023 "Flat White"
- 2023 "Circulate - EP"
- 2023 "Fusion Royale" (Booka Shade with Satin Jackets)
- 2023 "Metropolis"
- 2023 "Wild Life / So Dope"
- 2024 "No Memory / Out in the Fields"
- 2024 "So... / Outlandos"

=== Remixes ===
- 1996 Blue Fiction – "When the Girl Dances"
- 1996 Natural Born Grooves – "Forerunner"
- 1996 Solid – "Fall Down on Me"
- 1996 Smokin Beats – "Disco Dancin"
- 1996 Taucher – "Happiness"
- 2004 Freeform Five – "Strangest Things" (M.A.N.D.Y. Remix)
- 2004 Joakim – "Come into My Kitchen" (M.A.N.D.Y. Remix)
- 2005 Moby – "Dream About Me"
- 2005 Tahiti 80 – "Big Day"
- 2005 Fischerspooner – "Just Let Go" (M.A.N.D.Y. Remix)
- 2005 Chelonis R. Jones – "Middle Finger Music"
- 2005 The Juan MacLean – "Tito's Way"
- 2005 The Knife – "Pass This On" (M.A.N.D.Y. Knifer Mix)
- 2005 Mylo – "In My Arms" (M.A.N.D.Y. Remix)
- 2005 Rex the Dog – "Prototype" (M.A.N.D.Y. Remix)
- 2006 Depeche Mode – "Martyr" (Booka Shade Travel Mix/Booka Shade Full Vocal Mix Edit/Booka Shade Dub Mix)
- 2006 Hot Chip – "(Just Like We) Breakdown" (Booka Shade Dub Mix/Booka Shade Vox Mix)
- 2006 The Knife – "Marble House" (Booka Shade's Remix/Booka Shade's Polar Light Remix/Booka Shade's Polar Light Dub)
- 2006 Lindstrøm – "I Feel Space" (M.A.N.D.Y. Remix)
- 2006 Mylo – "Muscle Car" (DJ T. Remix)
- 2006 Rockers Hi-Fi – "Push Push" (M.A.N.D.Y. Pusher Remix)
- 2006 Spektrum – "May Day" (DJ T. Remix)
- 2006 Tiefschwarz feat. Tracey Thorn – "Damage" (M.A.N.D.Y. Rmx/M.A.N.D.Y. Dub Mix)
- 2006 Yello – "Oh Yeah"
- 2007 Azzido Da Bass – "Lonely By Your Side"
- 2007 Tiga – "3 Weeks" (Booka Shade Vocal Mix/Booka Shade Dub)
- 2007 Dave Gahan – Kingdom (Booka Shade Club Mix)
- 2007 will.i.am – Get Your Money
- 2009 Moderat – Rusty Nails (Booka Shade Remix)
- 2011 Nero – Reaching Out (Booka Shade Remix)
- 2014 Gorgon City featuring Jennifer Hudson – Go All Night (Booka Shade Remix)
- 2015 Karin Park x Pandora Drive – Hurricane (Booka Shade Remix)
- 2015 Faithless – Tarantula 2.0 (Booka Shade Remix)
- 2019 Verboten Berlin – Real Or Nature (Booka Shade Remix)
- 2020 Perry Farrell – "Wish Upon A Dog Star" (Booka Shade Remix)
- 2020 Booka Shade – "Teenage Spaceman" (Booka's 2020 Rework)
- 2021 Pontias with Several Definitions – "Outline" (Booka Shade Remix)
- 2021 Monkey Safari – "Temple" (Booka Shade Remix)
- 2022 Lufthaus with Robbie Williams – "Soul Seekers" (Booka Shade Remix)
- 2022 Jan Blomqvist – "Same Old Road" (Booka Shade Remix)
- 2022 JOPLYN – "REMIND ME" (Booka Shade Remix)

== Awards and nominations ==
- Beatport Music Awards – Best Tech House Artist 2008

== See also ==
- List of ambient music artists
