= Ciao! (Tiga album) =

Studio album by Tiga
- Released: April 27, 2009
- Length: 57:32
- Label: Turbo, PIAS

Tiga chronology
| Sexor (2006) | Ciao! (2009) | No Fantasy Required (2016) |

Singles from Ciao!
- 1. "Mind Dimension" Released: 1 December 2008; 2. "Shoes" Released: 9 March 2009

Ciao! is the second studio album from the Canadian electronic DJ/producer Tiga. It was released April 27, 2009 on Tiga's own label Turbo Recordings and the international label PIAS Recordings.

== Reception ==
Professional ratings
Review scores
| Source | Rating |
|---|---|
| AllMusic | 4.5/5 stars |
| Pitchfork | 7.4/10 |
| URB | 4/5 stars |

Initial critical response to Ciao! was generally positive. At Metacritic, which assigns a normalized rating out of 100 to reviews from mainstream critics, the album has received an average score of 76, based on 11 reviews.

== Track listing ==
| # | Title | Writer(s) | Producer(s) | Time |
|---|---|---|---|---|
| 1. | "Beep Beep Beep" | David Dewaele, Stephen Deweale | Soulwax | 3:50 |
| 2. | "Mind Dimension" | Jesper Dahlbäck | Soulwax, Jesper Dahlbäck | 4:37 |
| 3. | "Shoes" | Jason 'Gonzales' Beck, Jesper Dahlbäck | Soulwax, Jesper Dahlbäck | 3:48 |
| 4. | "What You Need" | David Deweale, Jesper Dahlbäck, Stephen Dewaele | Soulwax | 5:38 |
| 5. | "Luxury" | Jason 'Gonzales' Beck | Soulwax | 5:40 |
| 6. | "Sex O'Clock" | Jori Hulkkonen | James Murphy, Jori Hulkkonen | 4:05 |
| 7. | "Overtime" | David Dewaele, Stephen Dewaele | Soulwax | 6:11 |
| 8. | "Turn The Night On" | David Deweale, Jason 'Gonzales' Beck, Stephen Deweale | Soulwax | 3:15 |
| 9. | "Speak, Memory" | Jori Hulkkonen | Jori Hulkkonen | 3:41 |
| 10. | "Gentle Giant" | James Murphy | James Murphy | 6:08 |
| 11. | "Love Don't Dance Here Anymore" | Jason 'Gonzales' Beck | Soulwax | 10:38 |

All tracks co-written and co-produced by Tiga.

== Singles ==
"Mind Dimension" was the first released single from the album. Though "Shoes" was premiered on Tiga's Myspace page, being played more than 10,000 times in its first day. "Mind Dimension" was released with 2 versions:

Version A [2-Track Version]

1. Mind Dimension 2 (6:27)
2. Mind Dimension 1 (6:07)

Version B [3-Track Version]

1. Mind Dimension 2 (6:22)
2. Mind Dimension 1 (6:05)
3. Mind Dimension (The Bloody Beetroots Remix) (3:46)

== Charts ==
| Chart (2009) | Peak position |
|---|---|
| Belgian Albums Chart (Flanders) | 15 |
| Belgian Albums Chart (Wallonia) | 46 |
| French Albums Chart | 101 |
