= Ivory Tower (2010 film) =

- Directed by: Adam Traynor
- Written by: Chilly Gonzales; Céline Sciamma
- Produced by: Chilly Gonzales; Fraser Robinson; Melinda Cody; Matthieu Sibony; Nicolas Kazarnia
- Starring: Chilly Gonzales; Peaches; Tiga; Feist
- Cinematography: Lee Towndrow
- Edited by: Pauline Gaillard
- Music by: Chilly Gonzales, Boys Noize
- Distributed by: Gentle Threat, Schmooze, Première Heure Productions
- Release date: August 11, 2010 (Locarno)
- Running time: 75 minutes
- Country: Canada
- Language: English

Ivory Tower is a 2010 Canadian feature film and the directorial debut of Adam Traynor, a musician from the German-based hip-hop group Puppetmastaz. The film was co-written by Canadian pianist and rapper Gonzales and French director and screenwriter Céline Sciamma. It was released in the fall of 2010, and stars a variety of Canadian-born musicians, including Gonzales himself, Peaches, Feist and Tiga. Additionally, Gonzales' father appears in the film.

== Plot ==
The movie opens with former chess champion Hershell (Gonzales) returning home to Toronto from a trip to Europe. While visiting his mother, he finds out that his brother, Thaddeus who likes to be called Thad (Tiga), is engaged to his ex-girlfriend Marsha (Peaches) and took Hershell's title as the best chess player having won the National chess tournament 4 years in a row. After dinner, Hershell gives a violin to Marsha for her violinstallations, only to find out she does not do them anymore.

5 years earlier when Marsha and Hershell were dating, Marsha had an violinstallation, which is an artistic performance where she plays the violin through gesture recognition. Hershell was playing chess with Thad cheering him on. Hershell wanting to win his chess match sent Thad to Marsha's show. Marsha's performance came to an end as Hershell won his chess game. Thad and Marsha bonded after the show while waiting for Hershell. Thad ended up kissing Marsha.

In the present, Hershell comes up with the idea of Jazz Chess, when he pitches his idea he is told that the game need a face like his brother. Thaddeus is seen watching a home movie of him and Hershell as children getting a chess set as a present from their father. When Hershell visits his brother to talk to him about Jazz chess, Thad mocks Hershell's ideas and his artistic ideals.

Hershell goes to the park and ends up playing chess with a teenage girl. He starts tries introducing her to jazz chess. He comes across Nick who convinces him to return to the game to become the face of Jazz chess. Thad becomes angry when he learns that his brother challenged him. Marsha tries on her wedding dress and modifies it.

6 weeks earlier, In Berlin Hershell goes into a bookstore where he is looking for an old chess board. He ends up buying a violin, which he gives to his new girlfriend for her birthday, but she rejects the gift. Hershell is then seen playing chess surrounded by jazz musicians. He begins to make music with the chess pieces as the band plays.

Marsha is having trouble deciding on whether she should go to the chess tournament. As the tournament gets closer, Hershell and Thaddeus prepare for the tournament their own way, with Nick helping Hershell. Thaddeus speaks to his mother before the tournament and runs in into Hershell. They argue about Marsha. After Hershell talks to his mother, it is revealed that their father gave the brothers two different speeches before tournaments. He would tell Thaddeus it is all about the hate and Hershell that it is all about the love.

The day of the tournament has arrived, Thad makes the opening speech. The tournament begins, Thad plays with confidence as he wins his first game. As the tournament continues, the brothers continue to win their matches. They face off in the final round. The final round works differently, it is necessary to win 3 out of 5 matches in order to win the tournament. Hershell plays nervously and Thaddeus wins the first 2 rounds. During the break, Nick confronts Hershell in the bathroom. Hershell begins to play Jazz chess and wins the next two matches. During the last match, Thaddeus makes a mistake and leaves his king exposed, which could cost him the game. Hershell creates a Frozen standoff, thus creating a draw. Thaddeus, who wants a clear winner, is not happy with the outcome.

Marsha visits Hershell after the game and brings him the trophy. He does not accept the trophy as nobody won. He expresses his desire to be with Marsha again. But she declines announcing that she is leaving Thaddeus and she is going to start her violinstallations again. Hershell gives the trophy to Marsha, who accepts it, and they part ways.

Hershell learns that he still cannot sell Jazz Chess as no one won the tournament. Hershell goes to the park where he finds kids playing jazz chess, which is orchestrated by Thaddeus. They reconcile and begin to play Jazz chess. Thad says they can still sell the game and they decide to rename it Chezznutz.

== Cast ==
- Chilly Gonzales as Hershell Graves
- Tiga as Thadeus Graves
- Peaches as Marsha Thirteen
- George Anthony as Nick the Coach
- Angie Beck as Mother Graves
- Lil' Hamm as CCC Host
- Feist as a Canadian Chess Cyberchannel journalist

== Production ==
Ivory Tower was filmed in Toronto over 13 days. It was co-written by Gonzales and Celine Sciamma, directed by Adam Traynor and produced by Nicolas Kazarnia.

== Music ==
The Ivory Tower soundtrack was produced on September 14 by Boys Noize & Chilly Gonzales. The album features guest vocals by Feist, Katie Moore, Lisa Ababsa and Matthew Flowers. The soundtrack sounds more like an album because it was recorded before filming started. Therefore, the filming of the Ivory Tower was arranged around the album. The album put out a single called “Never Stop”, which was also produced by Boys Noize.
