= Arnaud Rebotini =

French musician (born 1970)

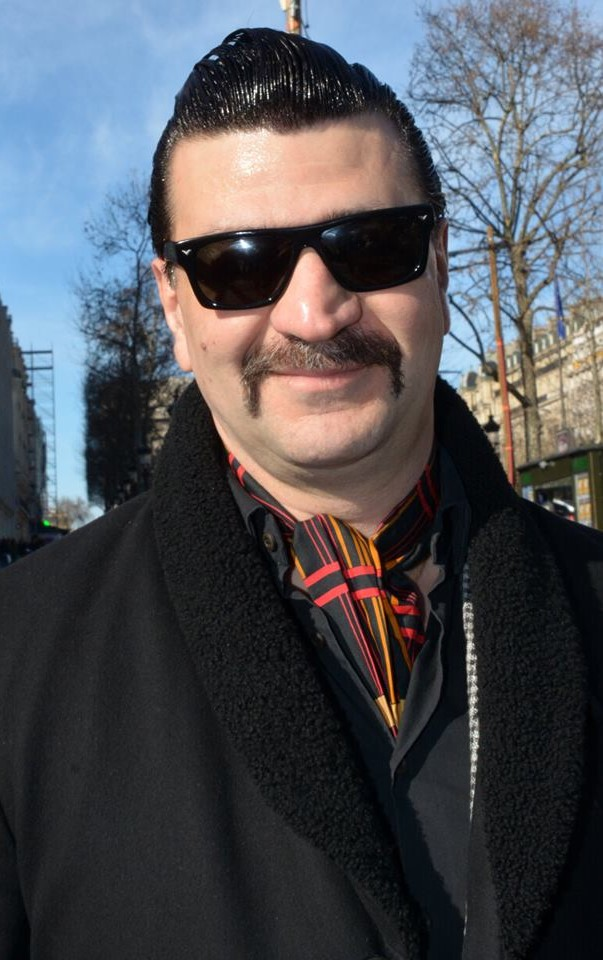
- Rebotini in 2018.

Background information
- Also known as: Aleph, Zend Avesta
- Born: 12 April 1970 (age 56); Nancy, France
- Genres: Electroclash, Electro house
- Occupations: Musician, Songwriter, Producer
- Member of: Black Strobe
- Website: Official site

Arnaud Rebotini (born 12 April 1970) is a French musician. He is a member of the band Black Strobe, which released their debut album Burn Your Own Church in 2007.

He has previously been a member of the death metal band Post Mortum, which later became Swamp.

In 1998, Rebotini participated to the album One Trip / One Noise by Noir Desir with the track "Lazy (Zend Avesta mix)".

In 2000, he released an experimental pop album Organique under the pseudonym of Zend Avesta. (Note: A reference to the Avestan language.)

In late 2008, Rebotini released Music Components with Citizen Records. In 2009 he released a remix version, Music Components Rev2.

In 2010, Rebotini received the "Artist Qwartz" award at the 6th edition of the Qwartz Electronic Music Awards.

In 2011, he released the album Someone Gave Me Religion with Blackstrobe Records. The album was promoted by two EPs, Personal Dictator EP and All You Need Is Techno EP.

== Equipment ==
- Roland : Roland Alpha Juno 2, Roland Juno-60, Roland JX-3P, Roland JX-8P, Roland SH-101, Roland TB-303, Roland TR-707, Roland TR-808, Roland TR-909
- Korg Mono/Poly
- ARP Odyssey
- Sequential Circuits Pro-One
- E-mu SP-1200

== Discography ==
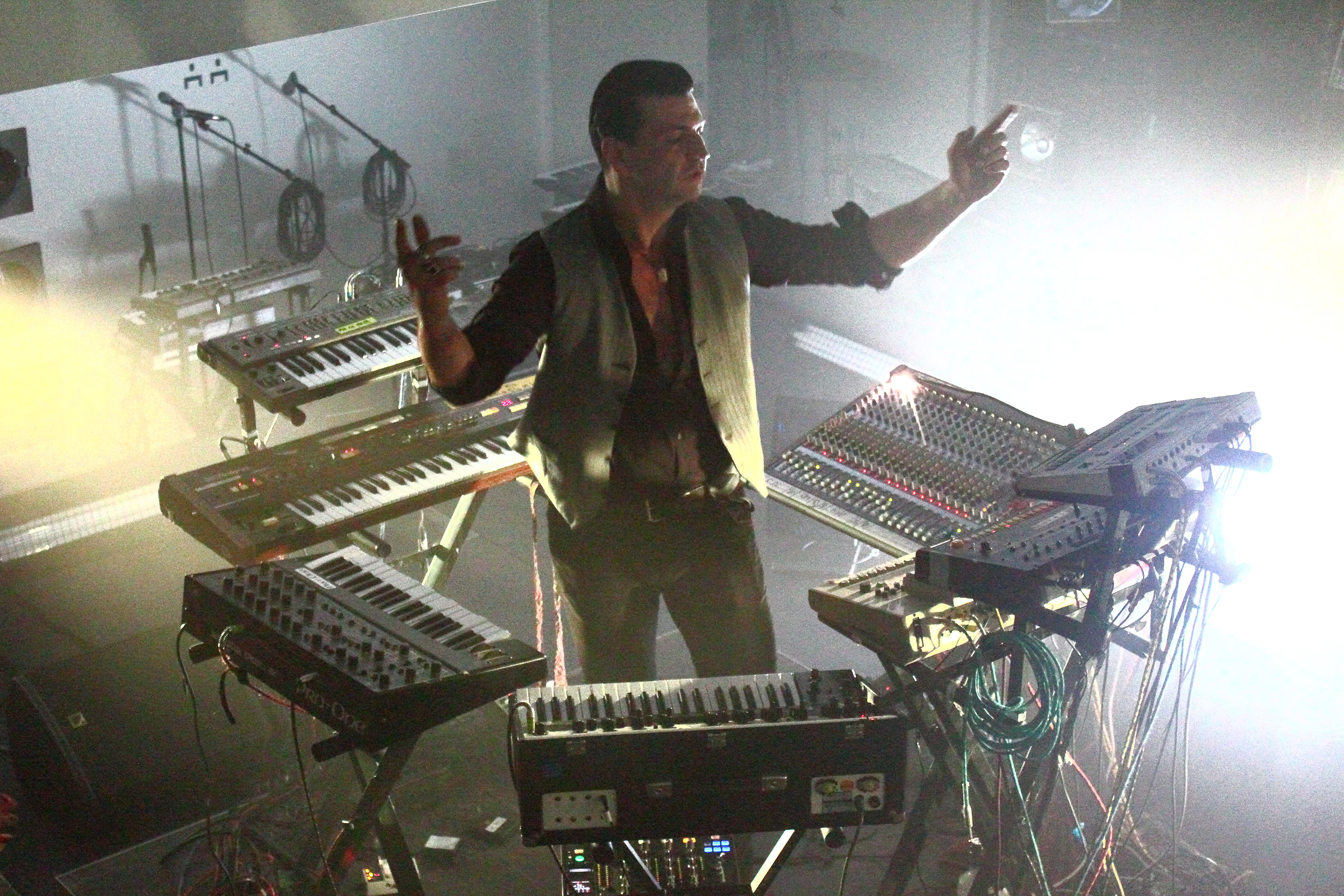
Rebotini performing in 2013.

Music Components (CDZ023 Citizen Records, 2008)

1. "The Spirit of Boogie"
2. "Un Cheval d’Orgueil"
3. "1314"
4. "Cm"
5. "The Swamp Waltz"
6. "Horns of Innocence"
7. "Conakry Filter Sweep"
8. "777"
9. "Decade of Aggression"
10. "MnII"

Music Components Rev2 (CDZ030 Citizen Records, 2009)

1. "The Spirit of Boogie" by Märtini Brös
2. "Un Cheval D'Orgueil" by Donovan
3. "1314" by Acid Washed
4. "Cm" by Chloé
5. "The Swamp Waltz" by Steve Moore
6. "Horns of Innocence" by Xaver Naudascher
7. "Conakry Filter Sweep" by Black Strobe
8. "777" by Discodéine
9. "Decade of Aggression" by Jesper Dahlback
10. "Mnll" by SomethingALaMode

Personal Dictator EP (BSR001 Blackstrobe Records, 2011)

1. "Personal Dictator" (12" mix)
2. "Personal Dictator" (Mixhell Remix)
3. "Personal Dictator" (Motor Remix)
4. "Personal Dictator" (The Hacker Remix)
5. "Twilight of Gods"

All You Need Is Techno EP (BSR002 Blackstrobe Records, 2011)

1. "All You Need Is Techno" (909 Remix)
2. "All You Need Is Techno" (Feadz Remix)
3. "All You Need Is Techno" (Gesaffelstein Remix)
4. "All You Need Is Techno"
5. "State Violence State Control"

Someone Gave Me Religion (BSR003 Blackstrobe Records, 2011)

1. "The First Thirteen Minutes of Love"
2. "Another Time, Another Place"
3. "Personal Dictator"
4. "Another Dictator"
5. "Echoes"
6. "All You Need Is Techno"
7. "Who’s GonnaPlayThisOldMachine?"
8. "Extreme Conditions Demand Extreme Responses"
9. "The Choir of the Dead Lovers"
10. "Sunny Sunday Blues" (Digital Only)

Another Time, Another Place EP (BSR004 Blackstrobe Records, 2011)

1. "Another Time, Another Place" (Radio Edit)
2. "Wardance"
3. "Another Time, Another Place" (Gucci Vump Remix)
4. "Another Time, Another Place" (Acid Washed Remix)
5. "Another Time, Another Place" (Mustang Remix)
6. "The First Thirteen Minutes of Love" (Turzi Remix)

== Filmography ==
=== As an actor ===
Film performances
| Year | Title | Role | Notes |
|---|---|---|---|
| 2012 | L'Âge atomique | the bouncer | |
| 2022 | Amour océan (short film) | the father | |
| 2023 | Àma Gloria | Cléo's father | |
