= Tiefschwarz =

German musical group

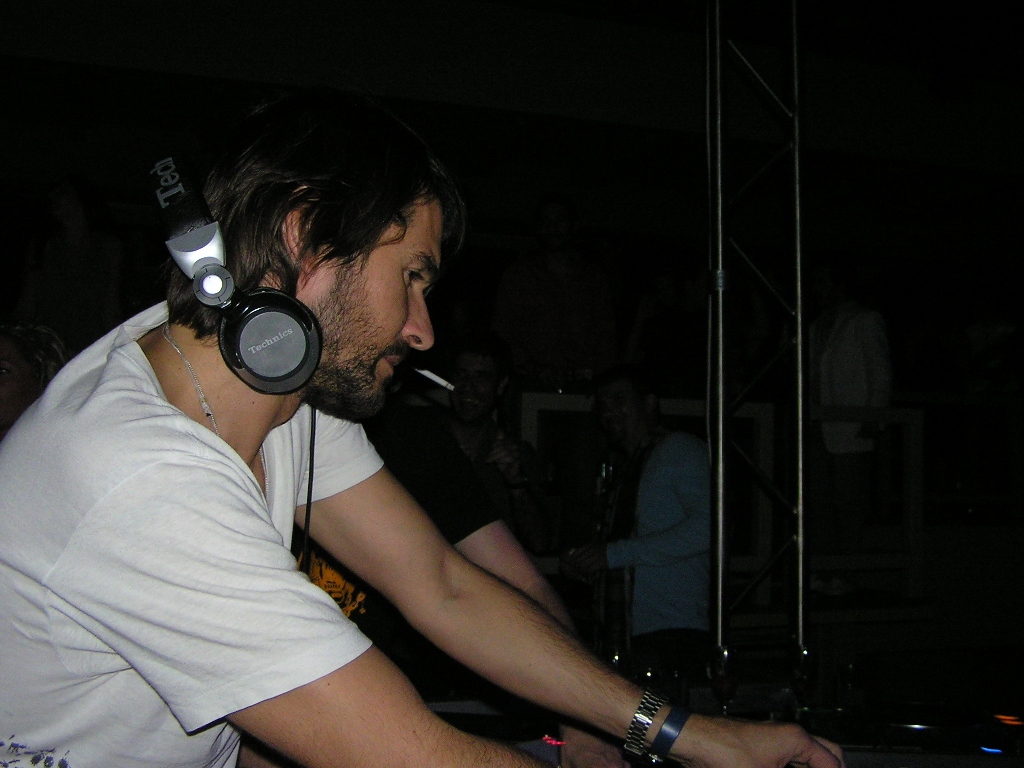

Background information
- Origin: Stuttgart, Germany
- Genres: House, tech house, electronic
- Years active: 1996–present
- Members: Alexander Schwarz; Sebastian Schwarz
- Past members: Peter Hoff
- Website: http://www.tiefschwarz.net

Tiefschwarz (German pronunciation: [tiːf.ʃʋaʁts]) are a German house group consisting of brothers, Alexander "Ali" (June 7, 1967) and Sebastian "Basti" (December 28, 1969) Schwarz, which formed in Stuttgart in 1996. Peter Hoff, who runs the Benztown studios in Stuttgart, joined later, and completed the first Tiefschwarz production team. Their name means "deep black" in German, and is a combination of the brothers' surnames, and their love of deep house.

Their earliest productions were released on the Continuemusics label in 1997, and their first taste of a well-respected label was with their Music track on François Kevorkian's Wave Music label in 1999. The team released their first album, RAL9005 on the Four Music label in 2001, which was later licensed to Derrick Carter and Luke Solomon's Classic Recordings label. Tiefschwarz continued to release on Classic until its collapse in 2005, as well as releasing on labels such as Fine and International DeeJay Gigolo Records. Many of their tracks have been licensed to compilations, from the Stereo Sushi series, to compilations for Bugged Out!, Get Physical and Renaissance, and in 2006, they released a mix of their own for the Fabric (London) mix series.

Their sound has been described as both deep, mellow house, and gritty, edgy electro house, their tracks having gained recognition from the likes of Ivan Smagghe, Touché, Sasha and Danny Howells.

Ali and Basti Schwarz have been travelling Europe as DJs since 1995, playing at major events and popular clubs all over Germany and Switzerland, as well as making appearances in Ibiza. They've performed in cities as far afield as Miami, New York, Melbourne, Sydney, Amsterdam, Sarajevo, London, Antwerp and Stockholm.

Tiefschwarz have composed remixes for Madonna's Get Together, Missy Elliott's Teary Eyed and Depeche Mode's single, John the Revelator.

2007 sees a return to a deeper house sound as shown in their 10 years anniversary compilation; 10 Years Of Blackmusik.

In January and July 2011 Tiefschwarz performed at the legendary aftershow party of the StyleNite, a cultural event of the designer Michael Michalsky during Berlin Fashion Week.

== Discography ==
- 1997 - 24 Seven (12") - Continuemusics
- 1997 - 24 Seven (Boris D'Lugosch mixes) (12") Continuemusics
- 1999 - Music (12" & CD) - Benztown
- 1999 - Music (2x12") - Wave Music
- 2000 - Boogie Wonderland 2K (12" & CD) - Dance Division
- 2000 - Holy Music (12") - Benztown
- 2000 - I'll Be Around (12") - Deep Culture
- 2000 - I'll Be Around (CD) - WEA (Germany)
- 2000 - Music (Promo) (12") - Attic Records
- 2001 - Never (12" & CD) - Four Music
- 2001 - No More Trouble (12" & CD) - Four Music
- 2001 - RAL9005 (3X12" & CD) - Four Music
- 2001 - Thru A Little Window (12") - Classic Recordings
- 2001 - You (12") - Four Music
- 2002 - Hello Again (12") - Classic Recordings
- 2002 - Never (12" & CD) - Classic Recordings
- 2002 - Never (Remixes) (12") - Classic Recordings
- 2002 - Nix (12" & CD) - Four Music
- 2002 - RAL9005 (3x12" & CD) - Classic Recordings
- 2003 - Ghostrack (12") - Four Music
- 2003 - Nix (12") - Classic Recordings
- 2004 - Blow (12") - International Deejay Gigolo Records
- 2005 - Eat Books (2x12" & CD) - Fine Records
- 2005 - Issst (12" & CD) - Four Music
- 2005 - Issst (Dominik Eulberg remix) - Four Music/Fine Records
- 2005 - Issst (Nathan Fake remix)
- 2005 - Wait & See (2x12" & CD) - Four Music/Fine Records
- 2005 - Warning Siren (2x12") - Four Music/Fine Records
- 2006 - Damage (12" & CD) - Fine Records
- 2006 - Fly (12") - Four Music
- 2007 - Original (12" & Download) - Souvenir Recordings
- 2007 - 10 Years Of Blackmusik (2xCD) - Souvenir Recordings
- 2012 - Dominate My Sensations (12" & Download) - Souvenir Recordings

== Remixes ==
- 1996 Ultra Naté - "Free"
- 1997 DPD feat. Rose Windross - "Sign Your Name"
- 1998 Joi Cardwell - "Soul to Bare"
- 1998 Jam & Spoon - "Don't Call It Love"
- 1998 Mousse T. vs. Hot 'N' Juicy - "Horny"
- 1998 Jennifer Paige - "Crush"
- 1998 Spike - "Respect"
- 1998 Byron Stingily - "Testify"
- 1998 Suburban Soul - "Lovin' You"
- 1998 Ultra Naté - "New Kind of Medicine"
- 1999 Masters At Work feat. La India - "To Be in Love"
- 1999 RAH Band - "Clouds Across the Moon"
- 2000 Awa Band - "Timba"
- 2000 Danacee - "Stop"
- 2000 Loreta - "Trouble with Boys" (Loreta Is High, Part 1 and Part 2)
- 2000 Nosotros feat. Raul Paz - "Contigo"
- 2000 Rapsody feat. MC Lyte & Danacee & Khaled - "Time for a Change"
- 2000 Spike - "Never Gonna Give You Up"
- 2001 Rick Astley - "Sleeping"
- 2001 2raumwohnung - "Sexy Girl"
- 2001 Bougie Soliterre - "Besides You"
- 2001 Mundo Azul - "Sereia"
- 2001 Sharon Phillips - "Touch Me"
- 2001 Shakatak - "Down on the Street"
- 2001 Weekend Players - "Into the Sun"
- 2001 Whirlpool Productions - "Lifechange"
- 2002 Cassius - "The Sound of Violence"
- 2002 Jon Cutler - "It's Yours"
- 2002 Jollymusic - "Talco Uno"
- 2002 Groove Armada - "Think Twice"
- 2002 M.A.N.D.Y. & The Sunsetpeople - "Sunsetpeople"
- 2002 Y-Files - "The Sky Is High"
- 2003 Chicks on Speed feat. Peaches - "We Don't Play Guitars"
- 2003 Freaks - "Where Were You When The Lights Went Out?"
- 2003 Isolée - "Brazil.com"
- 2003 Lost 'N' Alive - "Feels Like Love"
- 2003 Matsai - "He Boomah"
- 2003 Micatone - "Plastic Bags & Magazines"
- 2003 Minimal Compact - "Next One Is Real"
- 2003 Mocky - "Mickey Mouse Muthafuckers"
- 2003 The Rapture - "Sister Saviour"
- 2003 Trüby Trio - "Universal Love"
- 2003 Turntablerocker - "Rings"
- 2004 Air Liquide feat. Khan - "So Much Love"
- 2004 And.Ypsilon - "The Sky Is High"
- 2004 Djtal - "Digital World"
- 2004 Hell - "Listen to the Hiss"
- 2004 Kelis - "Trick Me"
- 2004 Lopazz - "Blood"
- 2004 Phonique feat. Die Elfen - "The Red Dress"
- 2004 Spektrum - "Kinda New"
- 2004 Unit 4 - "Bodydub"
- 2005 Alter Ego - "Beat the Bush"
- 2005 Chikinki - "Something More"
- 2005 Missy Elliott - "Teary Eyed"
- 2005 Fischerspooner - "A Kick in the Teeth"
- 2005 Freeform Five - "Electromagnetic"
- 2005 Goldfrapp - "Ooh La La"
- 2006 Depeche Mode - "John the Revelator"
- 2006 Ichundu - "Hey"
- 2006 Madonna - "Get Together"
- 2010 Hurts - "Better Than Love"
