= Stefan Eichinger =

Swiss DJ

LOPAZZ
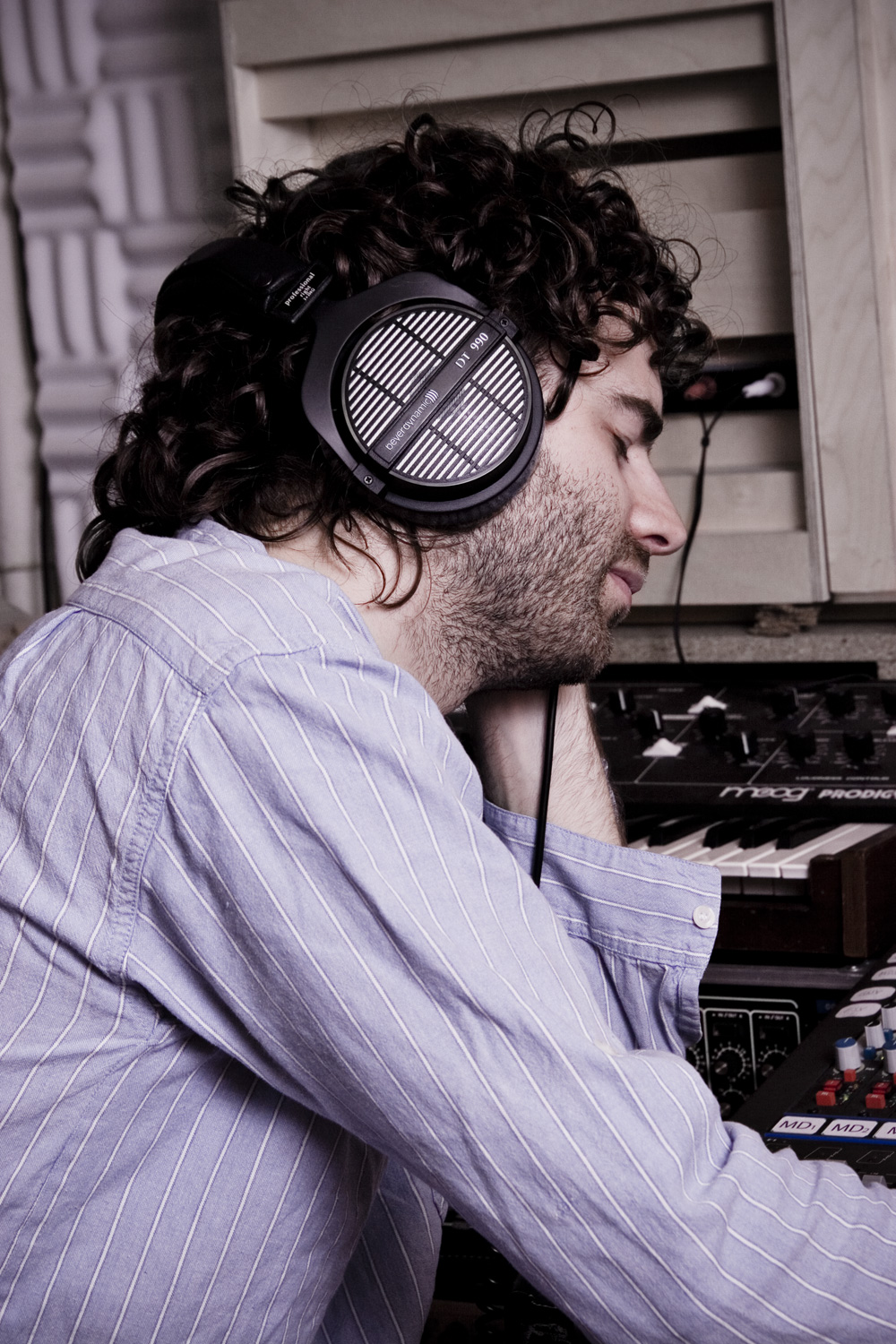

Background information
- Also known as: Stef An; LOPAZZ; Bad Cop Bad Cop; Jason Mason
- Born: Stefan Lopazz
- Origin: Zurich, Switzerland
- Genres: Electronic; Electronica; Techno; House
- Occupations: Composer; Disc jockey Electronic musician
- Years active: 1994–present
- Label: Get Physical Music

Since 1994 Stef Lopazz, also known as LOPAZZ, has been part of the Heidelberg based HD800 team; he also runs the multimedia label 800achtspur, and is renowned as a film composer and Mix-Mastering-Engineer, having written, produced and engineered many internationally acclaimed records and films. In 2001, he had success with Redagain P when they remixed the Miami Vice & Magnum, P.I. themes; then, in 2003, Lopazz's self-titled EP was released by Output Recordings, followed by the singles 'Blood' (including a Tiefschwarz remix) and his first bona fide club hit ‘I Need Ya’ (later relicensed by French fashion label Colette). Its success led to Lopazz remixing Germany's biggest pop act Xavier Naidoo, while techno legend Sven Väth snapped up ‘I Need Ya’ for his Sound of the Fourth Season mix CD. Stefan's relationship with Berlin-based Get Physical Music began when he was commissioned to remix Chelonis R. Jones' 'I Don't Know'. The label went on to issue Lopazz's own vocal track ‘Migracion’, which was subsequently remixed by Chilean producers Luciano and Ricardo Villalobos. Releases for Pokerflat, Cocoon and Compost Black Label followed, along with remixes and productions for the likes of Isolee, DJ T, M.A.N.D.Y., Matthew Dear and Imagination.

== Discography ( Excerpts ) ==
- 1993: KnoB - Karlsunruhe Compilation ( Sony / Subway Karlsruhe )
- 1994: Mason&Mesud - The Tapes 1-5 ( HD800Achtspur )
- 1995: Mason-Mesud-Stevensen - Ambiente ( HD800Achtspur )
- 1996: Mason&Mesud - Eigentlich wollte ich frei sein ( 800trak Kassettensampler 1 )
- 1996: Mason-Mesud-Stevensen - Contraband ( HD800Achtspur )
- 1997: Mason-Mesud-Stevensen - High Baby ( HD800Achtspur )
- 1997: Jason Mason - Headhouse E.P. ( HD800Achtspur )
- 1998: Mason-Mesud-Stevensen - Tonband ( HD800Achtspur )
- 1999: Fou Fou - Popkomm E.P. ( HD800Achtspur )
- 2000: Redagain P & LOPAZZ Magnum & Miami Vice Remixes ( Rams Horn )
- 2001: Output 64 - Commodore Remixes ( Enduro/Ladomat )
- 2001: Electuz - Compilation - LOPAZZ "Libertad"
- 2002: Lounge Essenzen - Vol.2 ( DieLounge )
- 2003: Nippon Connection - Compilation - LOPAZZ & A. Cortex "Chuo Ride..."
- 2003: LOPAZZ - E.P. ( Freundinnen )
- 2003: Soehne Mannheims - Mein Name ist Mensch - LOPAZZ Remix ( Universal Music )
- 2004: LOPAZZ - Migracion ( Get Physical Music )
- 2004: LOPAZZ - I Need Ya! ( Output Recordings )
- 2004: Sven Vaeth In The Mix: The Sound Of The Fourth Season - LOPAZZ "I need ya!"
- 2004: LOPAZZ - Blood ( Output Recordings )
- 2005: Channel 4 - A Compilation Of Output Recordings - LOPAZZ "Blood"
- 2005: LOPAZZ - Allemann ( Compost Records )
- 2005: Fabric 23 - Ivan Smagghe - LOPAZZ "Blood"
- 2005: Rio Reiser - Familienalbum 2 - LOPAZZ Remix ( Edel )
- 2006: LOPAZZ - Lasergun ( Lasergun Records )
- 2006: Compost Black Label Series Vol.1 - LOPAZZ: "C.o.D. + Estrella"
- 2006: Floorfiller - Restless - LOPAZZ / Tiefscharz "Blood"-Remix
- 2006: LOPAZZ - Ciegos ( Output Recordings )
- 2006: Get Physical Vol. 2 - 4th Anniversary Label Compilation - Luciano "Migracion"-Remix
- 2006: Lasergun Compilation 2 - LOPAZZ "Lasergun" + Bad Cop Bad Cop "Cube No.1"
- 2006: M.A.N.D.Y. - At the Controls - LOPAZZ "share my rhythm"( Resist )
- 2007: LOPAZZ - 12" Maxi mit Paul Ritch & Guillaume Remixes - 2 fast 4 u ( Get Physical Music )
- 2007: Pomelo E.P. - 12" E.P. Thundercamel with Casio Casino ( Pomelo )
- 2007: LOPAZZ - 2 fast 4 u ( Booka Shade K7 DJ Kicks )
- 2007: LOPAZZ - Debütalbum CD & Vinyl, iTunes & Beatport-Exclusive - Kook Kook ( Get Physical Music )
- 2007: A. Flatner & Deafny Moon - The Voice remix by LOPAZZ ( Circle Music Germany )
- 2007: LOPAZZ - Share my rhythm ( Get Physical Music )
- 2007: LOPAZZ - The Fact ( 5 years Get Physical Music Compilation )
- 2007: Anthony Collins - De Palma remix by LOPAZZ ( Meerestief Schallplatten )
- 2007: LOPAZZ - Chelonis Remix ( 5 years Get Physical Music Compilation )
- 2007: LOPAZZ - E.P. mit Deafny Moon & S. Pascalidis F**ck Me! ( Gigolo Records )
- 2007: Richard Bartz - Remix by LOPAZZ ( Kurbel records )
- 2007: LOPAZZ - Migracion remix by F+M ( 5 years Get Physical Music Compilation )
- 2008: LOPAZZ - Split Vinyl with Chloé/Pleinsoleil "Parau Api" ( Resopal Red )
- 2008: GPM 100 Compilation CD & Vinyl - LOPAZZ vs. Heidi "Funkshovel" ( Get Physical Music )
- 2008: Alex Flatner feat. LOPAZZ "Perfect Circles" ( Circle Music )
- 2008: Full Body Workout Compilation No.4 CD & Vinyl "Live in Brazil" ( Get Physical Music )
- 2008: LOPAZZ - 12" Maxi with Rex the Dog & Einzelkind Remixes - "We Are" ( Get Physical Music )
- 2008: BAD COP BAD COP - 12" Maxi "Top of the cops"( Kahlwild )
- 2008: Sonne Mond Sterne Compilation "Let´s do it in the club" ( BCB / Indigo )
- 2008: Felix da Housecat - GU34 Milan Mix-CD "2 fast 4 u" ( Global Underground )
- 2008: Trip to Asia - Remix CD - Berlin Philharmonic Orchestra ( Boomtown Media )
- 2008: Fabric38 - Mixed by M.A.N.D.Y. - LOPAZZ "2 fast 4 u" J. Ganzer Remix
- 2008: LOPAZZ - 12" Maxi with Jochen Trappe Remix - 24 hours ( Apparillo )
- 2009: Alex Flatner & LOPAZZ "Make up your mind" ( Cocoon rec. )
- 2009: Bronnt Industries Kapital - LOPAZZ Remix "Objects & Purpose" ( Get Physical Music )
- 2009: Smalltown Collective - LOPAZZ Remix "Gruenwandler" ( Bacteria )
- 2009: T. Becker feat. LOPAZZ "ltd.#012" ( Platzhirsch )
- 2009: LOPAZZ & Casio Casino - Album: "Ambient Film Themes Vol.1" ( Get Physical Music & iTunes )
- 2009: BAD COP BAD COP - 12" Maxi "Best of best of"( Kahlwild )
- 2009: Lopazz feat. Eddie Zarook & The Fix "GPM 108 Credit Card Receipt" ( Get Physical Music )
- 2009: Smalltown Collective - LOPAZZ Remix "Lotussaft" ( Session Deluxe Music )
- 2009: Loco Dice The Lab Mix Cd "Perfect Circles" ( NRK )
- 2009: DJ HELL / Gigolo 11 "Watermelon Man" ( International Deejay Gigolos )
- 2009: Sven Vaeth "Sound of the 9th season" ( Cocoon rec. )
- 2009: LOPAZZ & Casio Casino - Album: "Ambient Film Themes Vol.2" ( Get Physical Music & iTunes )
- 2009: Lopazz & Eddie Zarook "Studerrevox Tape-Recordings" ( Circle Music )
- 2009: Amnesia Compilation - LOPAZZ feat. Eddie Zarook "V-Point"
- 2009: Alex Flatner & LOPAZZ "Perfect Circles Remixes" ( Circle Music )
- 2009: M.A.N.D.Y. vs LOPAZZ "Full Of..." - Renaissance Compilation ( Renaissance )
- 2009: Kasper Bjorke "Young again" - LOPAZZ & Zarook RMX ( HFN )
- 2009: BAD COP BAD COP - 12" Maxi "Rerooting to dusty"( MNX )
- 2010: Raoul K - "Mystic Things" feat. LOPAZZ ( Baobab Secret )
- 2010: Alex Flatner & LOPAZZ "Make up your mind Remixes" ( Cocoon rec. )
- 2010: LOPAZZ & Friends feat. Imagination "GPM131" ( Get Physical Music )
- 2011: LOPAZZ & Alex Flatner „This“ ( Poker Flat )
- 2011: LOPAZZ edited by SIS „Migracion“ & „Funkshovel feat. Heidi“ ( Get Physical Music )
- 2011: Phreek „Passion“ - DJ T. Remix ( Compost Rec. )
- 2011: DJ T. „The Pleasure Principle“ co-produced by LOPAZZ ( Get Physical Music )
- 2011: LOPAZZ & Alex Flatner „Dinosaurs" ( HFN )
- 2011: LOPAZZ & Zarook „Bud“ ( HFN )
- 2012: Jordan Lieb - lovework - Defected in the House ( DJ T. Remix )
- 2012: LOPAZZ & Alex Flatner „Freedom of the heart“ ( Circle Music )
- 2012: 10 Years Get Physical Music - LOPAZZ „Share my rhythm“ ( DJ T. Mix )
- 2012: The House that Jack built - LOPAZZ „ Live in Brazil“ ( DJ T. Edit )
- 2012: LOPAZZ vs M.A.N.D.Y. feat. Nick Maurer „Bookarest“ ( Watergate Compilation )
- 2012: Circle Music Mixtape - LOPAZZ & Alex Flatner „Dislike“
- 2012: Tigerstripes „This Man“ ( LOPAZZ & M.A.N.D.Y. Remix )
- 2012: The Rapture „Children“ LOPAZZ Remix ( DFA )
- 2012: LOPAZZ & Alex Flatner „Our Love E.P.“ ( Get Physical Music )
- 2012: DJ T. „The Pleasure Principle“ Clubversions co-produced by LOPAZZ ( Get Physical Music )
- 2012: M.A.N.D.Y. vs LOPAZZ feat. Nick Maurer
- 2012: M.A.N.D.Y. vs LOPAZZ „Full of...“ Rework
- 2012: Chelonis R. Jones „The Irritant“ ( LOPAZZ & Casio Casino RMX )
- 2012: My Favourite Robot feat. Slok ( LOPAZZ & Casio Casino RMX )
- 2013: LOPAZZ & Casio Casino „I feel love“ ( Get Physical Music )
- 2013: Alex Niggemann - LOPAZZ & Flatner Remix - ( Poker Flat )
- 2013: M.A.N.D.Y. vs LOPAZZ ( Cityfox )

== Filmography ==
- 2012: Marco Polo Web-Doc ( AMP )
- 2012: „Perfektes Promi-Dinner“ & „GnTm“ ( LOPAZZ / DJ T. )
- 2010: "Desertification"
- 2010: "Perfektes Promi-Dinner"
- 2010: Treasures of the World – Heritage of Mankind - Melaka & Georgetown, Malaysia
- 2010: "Biofach 2010"
- 2009: Food Hunter - Part 7-8 / In China
- 2009: Bread for the World Campaign in Durban, South Africa
- 2009: Bread for the World Campaign in Konso, Ethiopia
- 2009: Treasures of the World – Heritage of Mankind - Aeolian Islands / Italy
- 2008: Treasures of the World – Heritage of Mankind - Durmitor / Montenegro
- 2008: Perfume Hunter - Der Duftjaeger/ arte
- 2008: Bread for the World Campaign - "Yellow & Fair"
- 2007: Treasures of the World – Heritage of Mankind - Essauoira / Morocco- Wo der Sand das Meer trifft
- 2007: Profession: Food Hunter - Auf kulinarischer Schatzsuche in Asien 2007 Teil 1-5
- 2006: Treasures of the World – Heritage of Mankind - Koguryo-Graeber / Nordkorea- Kampfbereit bis in alle Ewigkeit
- 2006: Treasures of the World – Heritage of Mankind - Merv / Turkmenistan - Ruinen einer Koenigsstadt
- 2006: Treasures of the World – Heritage of Mankind - Mongolei - Orchon Tal - Steine, Stupas, Staedte
- 2006: Treasures of the World – Heritage of Mankind - Macau / China
- 2005: Laos - Wassertaxi zur Koenigsstadt
- 2005: Profession: Food Hunter - Auf kulinarischer Schatzsuche in Asien
- 2005: Treasures of the World – Heritage of Mankind - Victoria Terminus / Victoria Bahnhof in Mumbai
- 2005: Reinhold Messner in der Mongolei - Mit Sohn Simon bei den Tuwa–Nomaden in der Mongolei
- 2005: Treasures of the World – Heritage of Mankind - Turkestan, Pilgerfahrt nach Turkestan
- 2004: Indien Maritime - Teil 1-3 & ARTE Beitrag für Lola
- 2004: Treasures of the World – Heritage of Mankind - Altstadt Tunis, Mausoleum des Hodscha Ahmed Yasawi
- 2004: Treasures of the World – Heritage of Mankind - Amalfi-Kueste Italien, Alles wie gemalt
- 2003: GEO 360 Grad - Mission Nordkorea
- 2003: Treasures of the World – Heritage of Mankind - Accra
- 2003: Treasures of the World – Heritage of Mankind - Ashantiland
- 2003: Treasures of the World – Heritage of Mankind - Samarkand
- 2003: Treasures of the World – Heritage of Mankind - Hội An
- 2002: Treasures of the World – Heritage of Mankind - Vigan
- 2002: Treasures of the World – Heritage of Mankind - Dhofar
- 2002: Treasures of the World – Heritage of Mankind - Huế
- 2002: Jeder Wind hat seine Reise - Teil 1-3
- 2001: Treasures of the World – Heritage of Mankind - Kathmandu-Tal
- 2001: Treasures of the World – Heritage of Mankind - Luang Prabang
- 2001: Treasures of the World – Heritage of Mankind - Banaue
- 2001: Treasures of the World – Heritage of Mankind - Halong-Bucht
- 2000: Treasures of the World – Heritage of Mankind - Buchara - Perle an der Seidenstrasse
- 2000: Drei Wege nach Samarkand - Die Spur des Propheten
- 1999: Treasures of the World – Heritage of Mankind - Ghadames
- 1999: Treasures of the World – Heritage of Mankind - Leptis Magna

== Sources ==
- https://www.lopazz.com
- http://www.myspace.com/lopazz
- http://www.achtspur.com
- http://www.schaetze-der-welt.de
- Stefan Eichinger discography at Discogs
