= The Sun & the Neon Light =

Studio album by Booka Shade
- Released: May 26, 2008
- Recorded: Late 2007 - Early 2008
- Genre: Electronic, house, downtempo, minimal
- Length: 62:45
- Label: Get Physical Music
- Producer: Booka Shade

Singles from The Sun & The Neon Light
- 1. "Charlotte"

Professional ratings
Aggregate scores
| Source | Rating |
|---|---|
| Metacritic | 68/100 |
Review scores
| Source | Rating |
| Allmusic | 3/5 stars |
| The Guardian | 4/5 stars |
| musicOMH | 4/5 stars |
| Now | NN |
| Pitchfork Media | 5.8/10 |
| Popmatters | 5/10 discs |
| Resident Advisor | 2/5 |
| Slant Magazine | 3.5/5 stars |
| Spin | 6/10 |
| URB | 4.5/5 stars |

The Sun & the Neon Light is the third studio album by Berlin-based electronic band Booka Shade, released on 26 May 2008 on Get Physical Music. The album features 14 tracks, including new, shortened versions of "Karma Car" and "Planetary", both of which had been previously released as EPs on Get Physical. "Charlotte" is the lead single, released ahead of the album on 14 May.

They are still masters in their field.

— Clash Magazine.

Release on the U.S. iTunes Store has "Charlotte" instead of "Redemption" since "Redemption" is included as a bonus track, the radio mix of "Numbers" is switched in with "Charlotte"'s position.

== Track listing ==
Disc One (Unmixed)
| No. | Title | Length |
|---|---|---|
| 1. | "Outskirts" | 4:53 |
| 2. | "Duke" | 4:32 |
| 3. | "Dusty Boots" | 3:25 |
| 4. | "Control Me" | 5:08 |
| 5. | "Solo City" | 4:34 |
| 6. | "Redemption" | 4:09 |
| 7. | "Charlotte" | 4:31 |
| 8. | "The Sun & the Neon Light" | 4:29 |
| 9. | "Sweet Lies" | 3:58 |
| 10. | "Karma Car" | 4:17 |
| 11. | "Psychameleon" | 4:56 |
| 12. | "Planetary" | 4:08 |
| 13. | "Comacabana" | 4:33 |
| 14. | "You Don't Know What You Do To Me (J's Lullaby)" | 5:12 |

Limited Edition Disc Two (Continuous Mix)
| No. | Title | Length |
|---|---|---|
| 1. | "Control Me (Non Vocal Mix)" |
| 2. | "Monkey On My Deck (Studio Version)" |
| 3. | "Dusty Boots (High At Noon Mix)" |
| 4. | "Karma Car (Club Mix)" |
| 5. | "Outskirts (Babelsberg Mix)" |
| 6. | "Sweet Lies (Spotlight Mix)" |
| 7. | "Charlotte (Extended Mix)" |
| 8. | "Redemption (Factory Mix)" |
| 9. | "Numbers (Extended Vocal Mix)" |
| 10. | "Duke (Arrival Mix)" |
| 11. | "You Don't Know What You Mean To Me (J's Lullaby)" |

iTunes Bonus Disc (Unmixed)
| No. | Title | Length |
|---|---|---|
| 1. | "Redemption" | 4:09 |
| 2. | "Psychameleon (First Mix)" | 5:22 |
| 3. | "Audio Commentary" | 8:00 |
| 4. | "Mandarine Girl (Reworked)" | 7:08 |
