= More! (album) =

Studio album by Booka Shade
- Released: 2010
- Genre: Electronic, techno, minimal techno
- Label: Get Physical Music
- Producer: Booka Shade

More! is the fourth studio album by Berlin-based electronic band Booka Shade, released in 2010 on Get Physical Music.

== Track listing ==
Disc One
No.	Title	Length
1.	"Havanna Sex Dwarf"	3:50
2.	"Donut (Interpretation)"	3:12
3.	"Regenerate"	5:33
4.	"The Door"	2:59
5.	"Teenage Spaceman"	5:35
6.	"Divine"	3:53
7.	"Scaramanga"	5:10
8.	"L.A.tely"	3:08
9.	"Bad Love"	5:13
10.	"No Difference"	2:21
11.	"This Is Not The Time"	4:46
