= Sexor =

Studio album by Tiga
- Released: February 6, 2006
- Genre: House
- Length: 58:51
- Label: Different
- Producer: Tiga; Soulwax; Jori Hulkkonen; Jesper Dahlbäck

Tiga chronology
Sexor (2006)	Ciao! (2009)

Singles from Sexor
- 1. "Pleasure from the Bass" Released: June 12, 2004; 2. "Louder than a Bomb" Released: March 11, 2005; 3. "You Gonna Want Me" Released: October 5, 2005; 4. "Good as Gold" Released: January 16, 2006; 5. "(Far from) Home" Released: April 24, 2006; 6. "3 Weeks" Released: November 27, 2006; 7. "You Gonna Want Me" Released: May 21, 2007 (reissue)

Professional ratings
Aggregate scores
Source	Rating
Metacritic	61/100
Review scores
Source	Rating
AllMusic	4/5 stars
Pitchfork	6.2/10
Resident Advisor	4/5 stars
Stylus Magazine	B
Spin Magazine	2/5 stars

Sexor is the debut album by Canadian electronic musician Tiga, released in 2006 on Different Recordings. It won the 2007 Juno Award for Dance Recording of the Year. The album's cover art is based on Bryan Ferry's In Your Mind.

== Track listing ==
No.	Title	Producer(s)	Length
1.	"Welcome to Planet Sexor"	Tiga	0:52
2.	"(Far from) Home"	Soulwax	2:43
3.	"You Gonna Want Me"	Soulwax	3:57
4.	"High School" (contains hidden track; "Jamaican Boa")	Jori Hulkkonen	3:13
5.	"Louder Than a Bomb" (originally by Public Enemy)	Soulwax	3:16
6.	"Pleasure from the Bass"	Jesper Dahlbäck	3:50
7.	"Who's That?"	Jesper Dahlbäck	1:13
8.	"Down in It" (originally by Nine Inch Nails)	Jesper Dahlbäck	3:30
9.	"The Ballad of Sexor"	Jesper Dahlbäck	3:22
10.	"Good as Gold" (contains hidden track; "Flexible Skulls")	Soulwax	7:38
11.	"(Far From) Home (The Speed of Sexor Reprise)"	Jesper Dahlbäck	4:32
12.	"Burning Down the House" (originally by Talking Heads)	Jesper Dahlbäck	4:07
13.	"3 Weeks"	Jesper Dahlbäck	4:19
14.	"Brothers" (contains hidden tracks; "Sir Sir Sir" and "8455584 Mommy")	Soulwax	8:05
Total length:			58:51

== Charts ==
Chart (2006)	Peak position
Belgian Albums Chart (Flanders)	5
Belgian Albums Chart (Wallonia)	25
Dutch Albums Chart	45
French Albums Chart	89
UK Albums Chart	139

== Notes ==
- "Far from Home" was featured on all of the trailers and as the theme song for Sony PlayStation Home.
- "Good as Gold/Flexible Skulls" was featured as a song in the racing game Need for Speed: Carbon.
