= Memento (Booka Shade album) =

Studio album by Booka Shade
- Released: November 4, 2004
- Genre: Electronic, house
- Label: Get Physical Music
- Producer: Booka Shade

Professional ratings
Review scores
Source	Rating
Allmusic	3.5/5 stars
Hot Press	4.5/5
Stylus Magazine	B+

Memento is the first studio album by Berlin-based electronic band Booka Shade, released on 4 November 2004 on Get Physical Music.

== Track listing ==
Disc One
No.	Title	Length
1.	"Vertigo"	6:40
2.	"Double Identity"	5:01
3.	"Memento"	4:32
4.	"On & On"	4:38
5.	"Friend For A Night"	6:01
6.	"Mr. Torrance"	2:32
7.	"Frantic"	5:10
8.	"Something Physical"	4:26
9.	"S.T.A.R.R.Z."	6:09
10.	"L'Armée Des Ombres"	1:39
11.	"Cha!"	3:48
12.	"16 MM"	0:53
13.	"Noisy Man"	3:21
14.	"Moonstruck"	6:37
