= DJ-Kicks: Chromeo =

Compilation album by Chromeo
- Released: September 29, 2009
- Genres: Electroclash, pop
- Label: Studio !K7

DJ-Kicks chronology
| Booka Shade (2007) | Chromeo (2009) | The Juan Maclean (2010) |

Chromeo chronology
| I Can't Tell You Why (2009) | DJ-Kicks: Chromeo (2009) |

Professional ratings
Review scores
| Source | Rating |
|---|---|
| Allmusic | 4/5 stars |
| Altsounds | (6.3/10) |
| Pitchfork Media | (6.5/10) |
| Resident Advisor | 4/5 stars |
| Time Out New York | 3/5 stars |

DJ-Kicks: Chromeo is a DJ mix album, mixed by Canadian duo Chromeo. It was released on September 29, 2009 under the Studio !K7 independent record label as part of their DJ-Kicks series.

== Track listing ==
1. "Ikeya-Seki" - Kano
2. "J'aime danser avec toi" - Pierre Perpall
3. "Moving Up" - Toba
4. "Gonna Get Over You" - France Joli
5. "Serious" - Donna Allen
6. "Maybe Tonight" - Lovelock
7. "Solar Antapex" - Chateau Marmont
8. "Seduction" - Val Young
9. "Larmes de métal" - Soupir
10. "Sequencer" - Lifelike
11. "Time to Move" - Carmen
12. "Don't You Wanna Make Love" - Shotgun
13. "Murphy's Law" - Chéri
14. "Easy to Love" - Leo Sayer
15. "Luckier" - Shazam
16. "I Can't Tell You Why (DJ Kicks)" - Chromeo
17. "Dans tes yeux" - Diane Tell
18. "Pipeline" - The Alan Parsons Project
