= Lee Towndrow =

American visual artist

Lee Towndrow is a visual artist based in New York City. He creates visual effects, and has been a photographer, credited with portraits of Lena Dunham, Martin Amis, Dan Brown, Michael Chabon, and Sheila Heti. He was the cinematographer for the title sequence and reenactments in the film Going Clear: Scientology and the Prison of Belief. His work has appeared in Time Magazine, The Paris Review, Das Magazin. He has worked as a visual effects artist on the feature film Carol, commercial campaigns for BMW, HONOR NYC, Morgan Stanley, TD Bank.

== Biography ==
Towndrow began his career as a designer and photographer at a design firm he founded. The firm was best known for creating the album cover artwork for prominent Canadian bands such as Sloan, The Flashing Lights, The Inbreds and Michelle McAdorey.

Lee Towndrow became a Flame artist at TOPIX Computer Graphics, where he created visual effects and design for television commercials, music videos, and feature films.

From 2004 to 2005 he lived in Buenos Aires, where he worked with Roberto Jacoby, the m7red center, fr:Raumlabor Berlin Kiwi and Cecilia Sainz and Eugenia Herrera on conceptual art installations, such as Proyecto Venus. Darkroom and ArteBA.

== Cinematography ==
Lee Towndrow worked as a cinematographer on three feature films, including Going Clear: Scientology and the Prison of Belief, Margaux Williamson's Teenager Hamlet, starring Sheila Heti and Sholem Krishtalka. In 2010 he collaborated with Gonzales, Peaches, Tiga and Adam Traynor on the 2010 film Ivory Tower, which received special mention at the Locarno International Film Festival in Switzerland. He has also photographed music videos for The National, Born Ruffians, Junior Boys and The Great Lakes.

== Visual Effects ==
Lee Towndrow has worked as a Flame and Smoke artist creating visual effects for the feature film Carol (film), advertising campaigns for BMW, HONOR NYC, Morgan Stanley, TD Bank.
