= DJ-Kicks: Booka Shade =

Compilation album by Booka Shade
- Released: 22 October 2007
- Genre: Electronic
- Label: Studio !K7
- Producer: Booka Shade

DJ-Kicks chronology
Hot Chip (2007)	Booka Shade (2007)	Chromeo (2009)

DJ-Kicks: Booka Shade is a DJ mix album, mixed by German house music duo Booka Shade. It was released in 2007 on the Studio !K7 independent record label as part of the DJ-Kicks series.

== Track listing ==
1. "A Different Kind Of Blue" - Passengers
2. "Slum Girl" - Nôze
3. "In The Smoke" - Cerrone / "Hang Around" (Wahoo Dub) - Ben Westbeech
4. "The Bank Robbery" - John Carpenter
5. "Estoril" - Booka Shade
6. "Situation" (US 12" remix) - Yazoo
7. "The Misida Monarchy" - Akiko Kiyama / "The Things I Saw" - Karel Fialka
8. "2 Fast 4 U" - Lopazz
9. "Play Your Part" - Quarion
10. "Arrival At The Library" - John Carpenter / "Far Away" - Mile Caro & Franck Garcia
11. "Alberto Balsam" - Aphex Twin
12. "Geisha Boys And Temple Girls" - Heaven 17
13. "Drums" - The Tubes
14. "Contact" - Brigitte Bardot
15. "Numbers" - Booka Shade
16. "Karasu" - Quarion
17. "It's Too Late" - The Streets
18. "Virtual Nature" - Amir Ad Fontes
19. "Landcruising" - Carl Craig
20. "Tide" - Matthew Dear
21. "Don & Sherri" (Hot Chip Remix) - Matthew Dear
22. "Last Orders" - Richard Hawley
