= Chicken Lips =

English dance music band and production team

Chicken Lips is a dance music band and production team from Stafford, England, that includes Andy Meecham and Dean Meredith, both formerly of Bizarre Inc, a band they created in the early 1990s.

== Career ==
Meecham and Meredith began working as Chicken Lips in 1999. Their music is more left-field House than the acid house that dominated in their earlier Bizarre Inc. productions. Their music has also been described as "disco-dub". As producers, they have issued in stream of twelve-inch singles released through the Kingsize label. With the addition of Steve Kotey, owner of Bear Funk Records, the Chicken Lips became a trio.

Meecham has also been involved in side-projects such as The Emperor Machine.

== Discography ==
=== Albums ===
- Echoman (2000), Kingsize
- Extended Play (2002), Kingsize
- Body Music – Nite:Life 015 (2003), NRK Nite Life
- DJ-Kicks: Chicken Lips (2003), !K7
- Re-Echoed, Re-Extended and Re-Hashed (2003), Kingsize
- Clicks, Acid 'n' Disco (2005), Trust the DJ
- Making Faces (2006), Adrift
- Show Your Shape (The Best Of Chicken Lips) (2010), Tirk
- Experience Of Malfunction (2010), Lipservice
- "D.R.O.M.P (Remixes)" (2012), Southern Fried Records

=== Singles ===
- "Shoe Beast"
- "Git Back"
- "Jerk Chicken"
- "He Not In"
- "You're Playing Dirty"
- "Blanc Tape"
- "Many Members"
- "Bad Skin"

=== Remixes ===
- 1999 Meat Katie – "Can't Hear Ya"
- 1999 MFA – "Mesmerized"
- 1999 Oshun Flow – "HalfLife"
- 1999 Riptide – "Got2Get2Gether"
- 2000 Bentley Rhythm Ace – "How'd I Do Dat?"
- 2000 Utah Saints – "Power to the Beats"
- 2001 Nigo – "March of the General"
- 2001 Organic Audio – "Nurega"
- 2001 Playgroup – "Number One"
- 2001 Shrinkwrap – "Illegal Entry"
- 2001 Stereo MCs – "We Belong in This World Together"
- 2001 Street Corner Symphony – "Memories of Aphrodite"
- 2001 Suns of Arqa – "Tomorrow Never Knows"
- 2001 The White Rabbit – "Transistor Queen"
- 2002 Maurice Fulton presents Stress – "My Gigolo"
- 2002 Nile – "To Sir with Love"
- 2002 Outcast – "Last Bullet"
- 2002 Justin Robertson Presents Revtone – "The Brightest Thing"
- 2002 Soul Mekanik Invents Ben-E-Lux – "If U Nu"
- 2002 Stylophonic – "Bizarre Mind"
- 2002 Underworld – "Dinosaur Adventure 3D"
- 2003 Chicks on Speed – "We Don't Play Guitars"
- 2003 Will Dawson – "Under the Water"
- 2003 FC Kahuna – "Hayling"
- 2003 Foolish & Sly – "Rainfalls"
- 2003 Jas – "Hitchhiking"
- 2003 Headman – "It Rough"
- 2003 Land Shark – "Tie Me Up"
- 2003 Ennio Morricone – "Teorema"
- 2003 Random Factor – "What I Need"
- 2003 Rocket – "People"
- 2003 Sono – "Heading For"
- 2003 Triangle Orchestra – "@ 137"
- 2004 Woody Braun – "Finding Words Ain't Easy"
- 2004 Nick Holder – "Player 1"
- 2004 Ignition – "Love Is War"
- 2004 Playgroup – "Make It Happen"
- 2004 Wink – "516 Acid"
- 2005 Hard-Fi – "Middle Eastern Holiday"
- 2005 The Kills – "No Wow"
- 2005 Mattafix – "To & Fro"
- 2005 Morcheeba – "Wonders Never Cease"
- 2005 Plant Life – "The Last Song"
- 2006 Alexkid with Liset Alea – "Nightshade"
- 2006 Bell X1 – "Flame"
- 2006 Clearlake – "Good Clean Fun"
- 2006 Sébastien Tellier – "Broadway"
- 2006 Tiga – "(Far From) Home"
- 2006 Robbie Williams – "Rudebox"
- 2007 Chin Chin – "Appetite"
- 2007 Tim Fuller – "The Slightest Touch"
- 2007 Kotey Extra Band feat. Chaz Jankel – "Sooner or Later"
- 2007 Mark Ronson feat. Daniel Merriweather – "Stop Me"
- 2007 Next Door But One – "Art Of The Matter"
- 2007 Wolfmother – "Love Train"
- 2008 Love Is All – "Make Out Fall Out Make Up"
- 2008 Pnau – "Embrace"
