= Àma Gloria =

2023 French film by Marie Amachoukeli

- Directed by: Marie Amachoukeli
- Screenplay by: Marie Amachoukeli, Pauline Guéna
- Produced by: Bénédicte Couvreur
- Starring: Louise Mauroy-Panzani; Ilça Moreno Zego; Arnaud Rebotini
- Cinematography: Inès Tabarin
- Edited by: Suzana Pedro
- Music by: Fanny Martin
- Production company: Lilies Films
- Distributed by: Pyramide Films
- Release date: 17 May 2023 (France)
- Running time: 84
- Country: France
- Languages: French, Cape Verdean Creole
- Box office: $613,627

Àma Gloria is a 2023 French film written and directed by Marie Amachoukeli.

== Plot summary ==
Cléo is six years old, has glasses and a dad - but has lost her mother to cancer. Fortunately, there is Gloria, her nanny, who loves her and whom Cléo adores. However, Gloria's mother has also died, and she must return to her native island of Santiago in Cape Verde to care for own children, the teenage César, who has seldom seen her, and the twenty-year-old Fernanda, who is about to give birth to her own child. Gloria will also supervise the construction of a hotel that she hopes to open for the next tourist season.

Cléo is shocked, and only the promise that she manages to extract from her father cheers her up: the following summer she will be able to join Gloria in her village. Although Cléo harbours a secret hope of bringing "her" Gloria back to Paris, she comes to understand that Gloria now has her own life.

== Cast ==
- Louise Mauroy-Panzani as Cléo
- Ilça Moreno as Gloria
- Arnaud Rebotini as Arnaud
- Abnara Gomes Varela as Fernanda
- Fredy Gomes Tavares as César
- Domingos Borges Almeida as Joachim

== Critical reception ==
On the review aggregator Rotten Tomatoes website, the film has an approval rating of 100% based on 23 reviews.

Jessica Kiang, writing for Variety praised Mauroy-Panzani: "A last summer of nanny-child togetherness is detailed in a debut made dazzling by an astonishingly intricate performance from its six-year-old star."

Charlotte O'Sullivan of The Guardian also had appreations for the film and its young lead actress, writing that "One of the year’s most hypnotic performances nestles inside this seemingly modest French-language coming-of-age drama" calling Mauroy-Panzani a "Gifted six-year-old newcomer."

Allan Hunger of Screen Daily wrote that "Ama Gloria is quite the heartbreaker as writer/director Marie Amachoukeli confidently traces the intense bond between a six year-old girl and her beloved nanny."

Mansel Stimpson of Film Review Daily wrote "Over the years it is impossible not to be amazed by the remarkable achievements of so many child players who have taken leading roles in films. Nevertheless, [...] it is immediately clear that Louise Mauroy-Panzani is not just on that level but that her portrayal of the six-year-old Cléo is one for the ages. [...], she astounds us all over again when, near the close of the film, she rises to the challenge of a big dramatic scene which one would expect to be outside the capability of such a young actor."

== Accolades ==
Critics' Week chose to have Àma Gloria world premiere at its opening gala.
