= DJ-Kicks: Chicken Lips =

Compilation album by Chicken Lips
- Released: 3 November 2003
- Recorded: n/a
- Genre: House / Experimental / Disco
- Label: Studio !K7 !K7155CD (CD)

DJ-Kicks chronology
Tiga (2002)	Chicken Lips (2003)	Erlend Øye (2004)

Professional ratings
Review scores
Source	Rating
Allmusic	3.5/5 stars

DJ-Kicks: Chicken Lips is a DJ mix album, mixed by Chicken Lips. It was released on 3 November 2003 on the Studio !K7 independent record label as part of the DJ-Kicks series.

== Track listing ==
1. "Places of Light" - Brainticket (Bryer, Muir, Joel Vandroogenbroeck) – 3:46
2. "Meaning of Love" - Karin Krog (Jon Christensen, Matthew Herbert, Karin Krog, Steve Kuhn, Steve Swallow) – 3:10
3. "The Bubble Bunch (Original Jellybean 12” mix)" - Jimmy Spicer (Russell Simmons, Lawrence Smith, Jimmy Spicer) – 3:29
4. "Shotgun" - Colourbox (Young) – 2:09
5. "African Reggae" - Nina Hagen (Heil, Bernhard Potschka) – 4:01
6. "Limitations" - Lindstrom (Hans-Peter Lindstrom) – 4:25
7. "Wax The Van (Kenny’s Club Version)" - Lola (Lola Blank, Arthur Russell) – 2:47
8. "Congo Man (Carl Craig Mix)" - The Congos (Roy Johnson, Cedric Myton) – 2:22
9. "You’re Not Ready Yet" - Chicken Lips (Andrew Meecham, Dean Meredith) – 3:33
10. "Seventh Heaven (Larry Levan Mix)" - Gwen Guthrie (Tamy Lester Smith) – 4:35
11. "Treat Me (Dubmental Mix-A Pablovia RaBaN Mix)" - The Paul Simpson Connection (Paul Simpson) – 3:29
12. "Music A Fe Rule" - Rhythm & Sound w/ Paul St. Hilaire (Mark Ernestas, Oswald Moritz, Paul Hilaire) – 0:22
13. "Crisis" - Tik and Tok (Tim Dry) – 2:20
14. Light Years Away (Dub)" - Warp 9 (Lotti Golden, Richard Scher) – 1:14
15. "Beat The Street (Instrumental)" - Sharon Redd (Eric Matthew, Darryl Payne) – 0:18
16. "Wind Ya Neck In" - Chicken Lips (Meecham, Meredith) – 5:26
17. "Suckee" - Big Two Hundred (Meecham, Meredith) – 5:02
18. "Animal Rhapsody (Dennis Bovell Mix)" - The Raincoats (Birch, Raincoats) – 4:42
19. "Brazilian Love Affair" - George Duke (George Duke) – 4:37
20. "Nice and Soft" - Wish & La-Rita Gaskin (Carmichael) – 3:47
21. "Bad Skin (DJ-Kicks)" - Chicken Lips (Meecham, Meredith, Kotey, Crazy Girl) – 4:14

== Personnel ==
- Bob Blank – producer
- Lola Blank – producer
- Greg Carmichael – producer
- Chicken Lips – producer, Compilation, Mixing
- The Congos – producer
- Carl Craig – editing
- Crazy Girl – vocals
- Lotti Golden – producer, mixing
- Matthew Herbert – producer
- Jellybean – producer, mixing
- François Kevorkian – producer
- Hans Peter Lindstrøm – producer
- Stevie Kotey - Producer
- Andy Meecham – producer
- Dean Meredith – producer
- Lee Perry – producer
- Dave Rimmer – Liner Notes
- Paul St. Hilaire – Text
- Richard Scher – producer, mixing
- Paul Simpson – arranger, producer
- Arthur Storey Jr. – producer
- Fred Zarr – producer
