= Nuit Blanche (album) =

Studio album by Vive la Fête
- Released: 2003
- Genre: Electronica, electroclash
- Label: Surprise Records

Vive la Fête chronology
Republique Populaire (2001)	Nuit Blanche (2003)	Grand Prix (2005)

Professional ratings
Review scores
Source	Rating
Allmusic	link

Nuit Blanche is the third album by Belgian electronic group Vive la Fête.

== Track listing ==
No.	Title	Length
1.	"Nuit blanche"	3:27
2.	"Touche pas"	3:28
3.	"Jaloux"	3:54
4.	"Joyeux"	4:14
5.	"Mon dieu"	4:16
6.	"Maladie d'un fou"	3:55
7.	"Assez"	4:33
8.	"Noir désir"	5:56
9.	"KL"	3:25
10.	"Mr. le président"	4:30
11.	"Maquillage"	3:49
12.	"Adieu"	3:23

- On the Brazilian digipak edition, track 2 is "Schwarzkopf". The track "Touche Pas" is only available in Brazil in the best-of collection "10 Ans de Fête".
- There is a hidden track at the end of the "Adieu".
