= Vive la Fête =

Belgian synthpop band

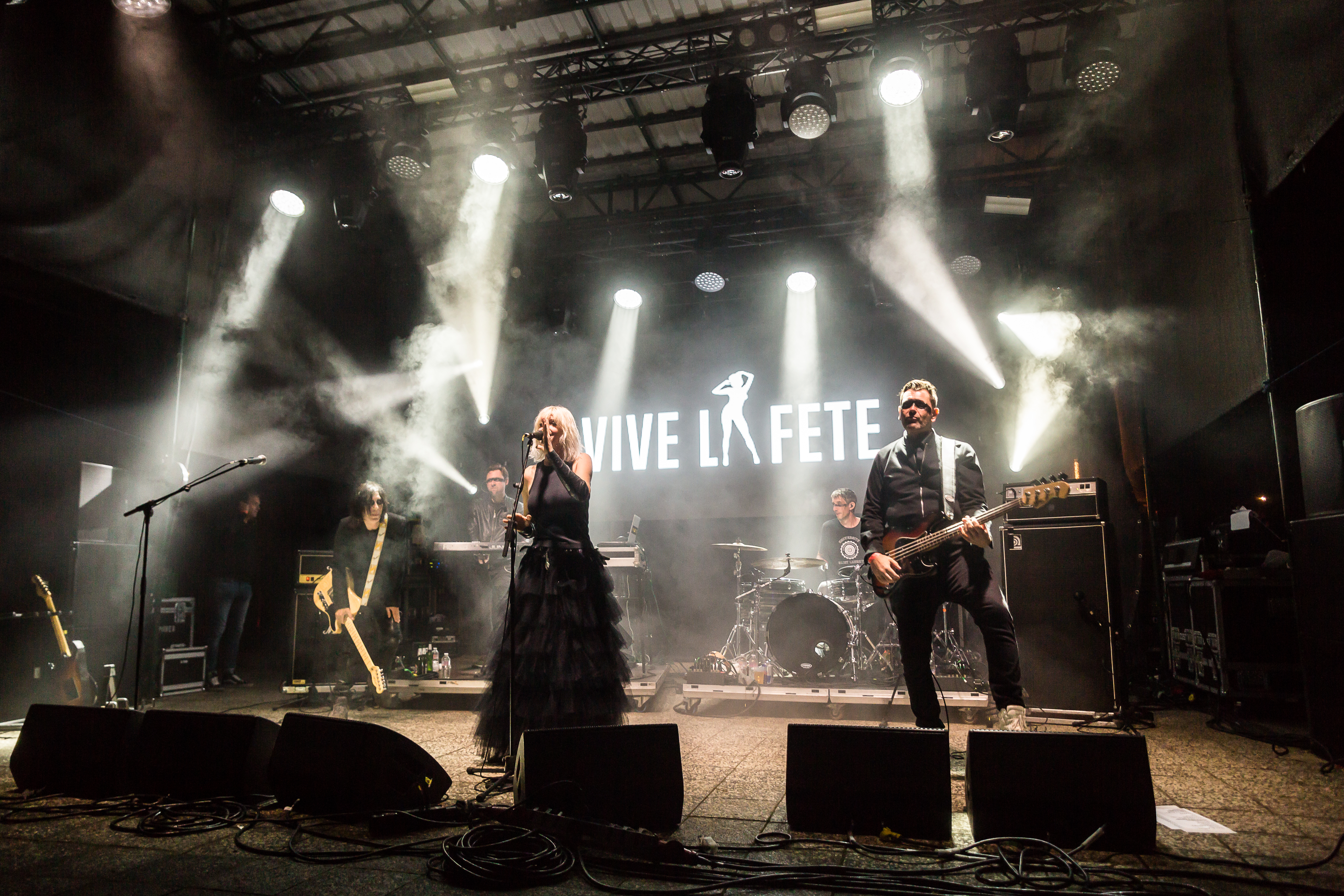
- Vive la Fête performing live in 2023

Background information
- Origin: Ghent, East Flanders, Belgium
- Genres: Synthpop; electroclash; dance-punk; new wave; electronic rock
- Years active: 1997–present
- Labels: Kinky Star, Surprise, UWe, Firme de Disque
- Members: Danny Mommens; Els Pynoo; Dirk Cant; Gilles Balcaen; Maarten de Meyer
- Website: vivelafete.be

Vive la Fête (English: Long live the party) is a Belgian music duo from Ghent, East Flanders, formed in 1997 by Danny Mommens (guitar, vocals) and Els Pynoo (vocals).

== History ==
Vive la Fête was founded in 1997 when Danny Mommens (then still a member of dEUS) met Els Pynoo at a party hosted by or for her sister. Mommens had previously been an acquaintance of Pynoo's sister, who had photographed Els nude and later shown the picture to him.

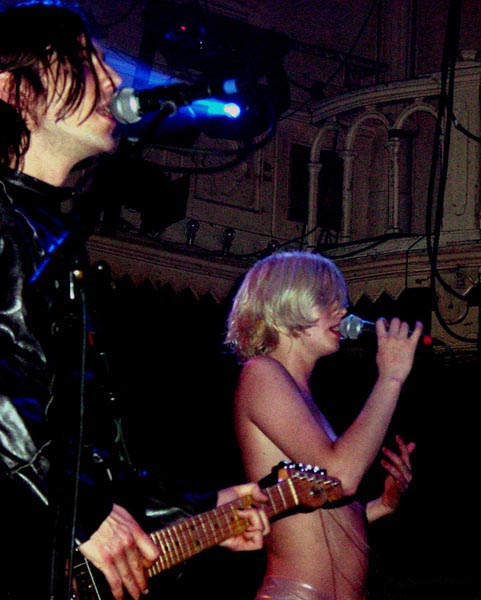
Vive la Fête performing live at the Paradiso in Amsterdam, 2001.

In a 2005 interview, Els recounted that Mommens had approached her in a casual manner and randomly remarked, "Hey I saw you naked!" Mommens recorded a few demos with Pynoo on his 8-track recorder, which were later released as the EP Je ne veux pas (also referred to as Paris). The EP gained attention for its resemblance to '80s new wave music.

Their first major success came with their debut album, Attaque Surprise (2000). Subsequent records such as République Populaire (2001) and Nuit Blanche (2003) increased their popularity, particularly in the fashion world, where Karl Lagerfeld became a fan. Lagerfeld invited them to perform at several of his major shows in New York City, Las Vegas, Tokyo, Berlin, Milan and Paris.

In 2005, they released the album Grand Prix and toured extensively across Europe, while also performing shows in Brazil and Mexico.

By 2007, they released Jour de Chance and continued touring. In 2009, the compilation album Disque d’Or was released, reinforcing their status in the synthpop scene.

In the 2010s, three albums were released Produit de Belgique (2012), 2013 (2013) and Destination Amour (2018).

In 2020, Vive la Fête revisited their back catalogue. They released a Special Edition of Attaque Surprise, originally their 2000 debut album, featuring bonus tracks for streaming and download. This was part of broader archival activity, including digital re-releases and resurrected materials. The band also launched a new album, Viva Alternativa, accompanied by the release of a stylized summer-video of the track Toi Tourne Toi in 2021.

In 2024, after celebrating their 25th anniversary with a sold-out European tour, the electro band announced new work for the first time since 2018. The first single, Sauvage, characterized by the band's typical catchy sound was released on November 5, 2024. The EP Les Sauvages was released in early March 2025.

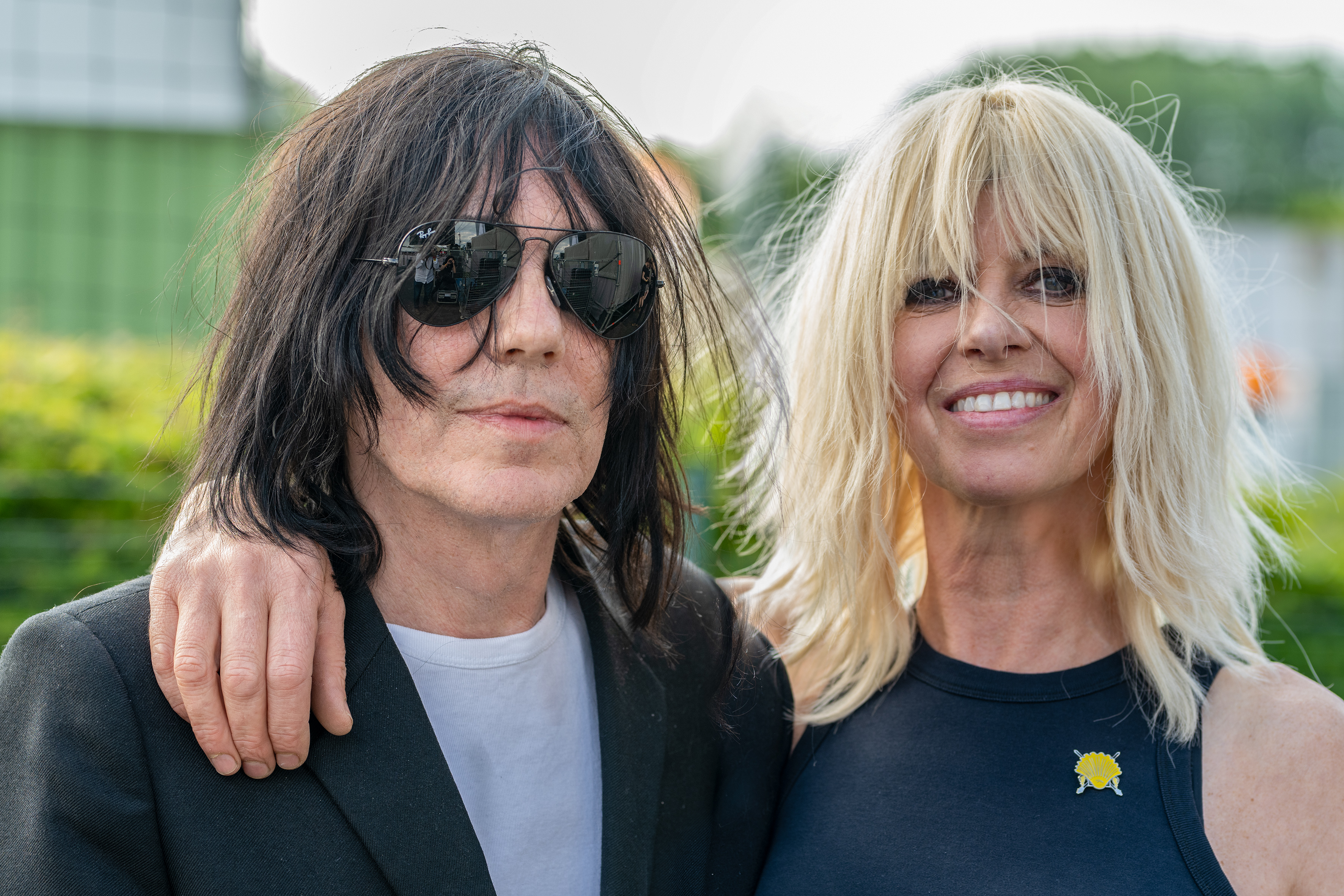
Danny Mommens and Els Pynoo in 2024

== Discography ==
=== Studio albums ===
Title	Details	Peak chart positions		
Title	Details	BEL (FL)	BEL (WA)	NL
Attaque surprise	Released: 2000; Label: Surprise; Format: CD	—	—	—
République populaire	Released: 2001; Label: Surprise; Format: CD	—	—	—
Nuit blanche	Released: 28 April 2003; Label: Surprise; Formats: CD, LP, digital download	10	—	—
Grand Prix	Released: 23 May 2005; Label: Surprise; Formats: CD, LP, digital download	4	71	75
Jour de chance	Released: 8 June 2007; Label: UWe; Format: CD	15	61	—
Disque d'or	Released: 8 June 2009; Label: Firme de Disque; Formats: CD, digital download	27	96	—
Produit de Belgique	Released: 11 May 2012; Label: Firme de Disque; Formats: CD, digital download	48	133	—
2013	Released: 26 April 2013; Label: Firme de Disque; Formats: CD, digital download	70	139	—
Destination amour	Released: 27 March 2018; Label: Firme de Disque; Formats: CD, digital download	—	—	—
"—" denotes a recording that did not chart or was not released in that territory.

=== Compilation albums ===
Title	Details	Peak chart positions
Title	Details	BEL (FL)
Attaque populaire	Released: December 2003; Label: Surprise; Format: LP	—
Vive les remixes	Released: 1 August 2006; Label: Surprise; Formats: CD, digital download	—
10 ans de fête	Released: 8 December 2008; Label: Firme de Disque; Format: CD	83
Viva Alternativa	Released: 26 August 2021; Label: Firme de Disque; Formats: CD, digital download	—
"—" denotes a recording that did not chart or was not released in that territory.

=== Extended plays ===
- Je ne veux pas (Kinky Star, 1998)
- Tokyo (Surprise, 2000)
- Schwarzkopf Remix (Surprise, 2004)
- La vérité (Surprise, 2006)
- Everybody Hates Me **Remix EP** (Firme de Disque, 2010)
- Les Sauvages (Firme de Disque, 2025)
