= Ivan Smagghe =

French DJ and producer

Ivan Smagghe is a French DJ and producer. He was originally known as Ivan Rough Trade, after his job in the Rough Trade record store in Paris.

== Career ==
His musical style has been described as electro house and "minimal electro." Smagghe's Death Disco compilation was a key release in the electroclash genre. He formed Black Strobe in 1997 with Arnaud Rebotini, but left in 2006. Black Strobe describe their dark electronic sound as "frozen balearic gay biker house". Smagghe is also a member of the Volga Select project, with Marc Collin.

== Compilation discography ==
=== As Ivan Rough Trade ===
- French Fried Funk (Slip 'n' Slide Records, 1997).

=== As Ivan Smagghe ===
- How To Kill The DJ (Part One) (Tigersushi Records, 2003)
- Bugged Out! Presents Suck My Deck (React, 2004)
- Death Disco (Eskimo, 2004)
- Fabric 23 (Fabric London, 2005)
- Kill The DJ Introducing The Dysfunctional Family - A Mixed Up Compilation By Chloé Et Ivan Smagghe (Kill The DJ Records, 2006)
- Cocoricò 03 (Mantra Vibes, 2008)
