= Tiga (musician) =

Canadian DJ and musician (born 1974)

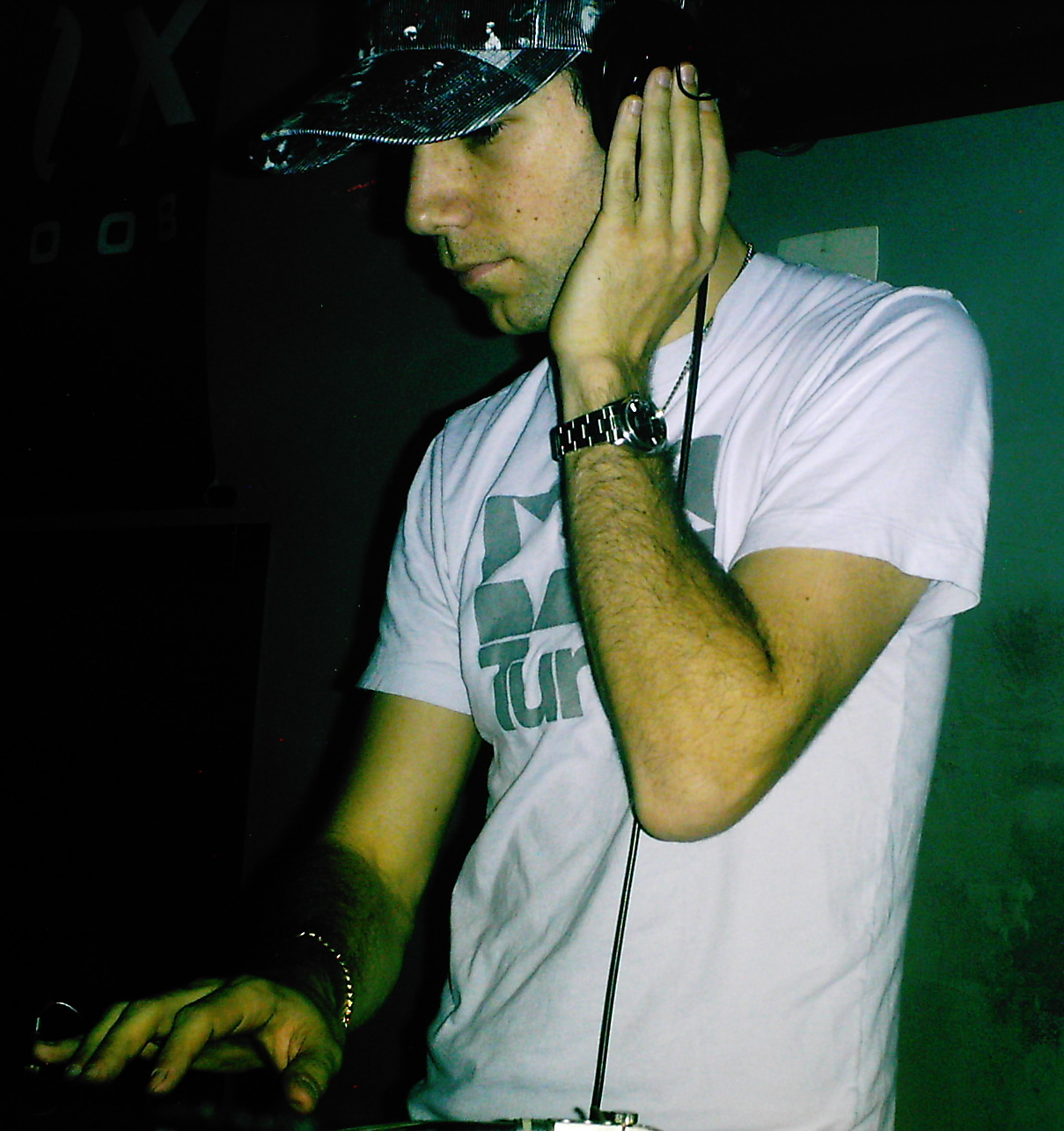
- Tiga in 2007

Background information
- Born: Tiga James Sontag; 18 September 1974 (age 52); Montreal, Quebec, Canada
- Origin: Montreal, Quebec, Canada
- Genres: Electronic; house; electro; hip hop; UK garage
- Occupations: Producer, DJ, singer-songwriter
- Years active: Late 1990s–present
- Labels: Turbo Recordings; PIAS Recordings
- Website: tiga.ca

Tiga James Sontag (born 18 September 1974), known simply as Tiga (/ˈtiːɡə/), is a Canadian musician, DJ, record producer, and music programmer. He has released four albums: Sexor (2006), Ciao! (2009), No Fantasy Required (2016), and Hotlife (2026). With his debut album, Sexor, winning the 2007 Juno Award for Dance Recording of the Year. Tiga released a selection of compilations in the early 2000s, featuring mixes such as American Gigolo, DJ-Kicks: Tiga and, Mixed Emotions. His compilation mix, Tiga Non-Stop, was released in November 2012, and premiered Tiga's latest single "Plush". The mix also features tracks from artists such as Kindness, Duke Dumont and Blawan.

Tiga has remixed songs from The xx, LCD Soundsystem, The Kills, Cabaret Voltaire, Scissor Sisters, Peaches, Moby, Depeche Mode, Justice, Friendly Fires and Mylo. Along with Zombie Nation, Tiga is half of ZZT, and has released material as The Dove, Rainer Werner Bassfinder (with Jesper Dahlbäck), and TGV (with Mateo Murphy). He has also co-produced music with Soulwax, James Murphy, Chilly Gonzales, Jesper Dahlbäck, and Matthew Dear, who he worked with on "Plush".

As a solo artist, Tiga released "Sunglasses at Night" with Finnish producer Jori Hulkkonen. The single reached number 25 in the UK Dance Chart. Other successful chart singles include "Pleasure From the Bass", "You Gonna Want Me" featuring Jake Shears, and his 2009 release "Shoes", co-produced with Soulwax and Chilly Gonzales.

Tiga was the host of the BBC Radio 6 Music show My Name Is Tiga, and made his acting debut in the 2010 film Ivory Tower. The film won special mention at the Locarno International Film Festival.

Tiga hosts a podcast titled Last Party On Earth, Season 1 in 2019 featured guests Annie Mac, Pete Tong, Carl Cox.

== Personal life ==
Tiga was born to hippie parents and spent part of his early life in Goa, India. He also attended Selwyn House School in Montreal, Quebec, Canada.

== Career ==
=== 1990s ===
In 1990 Tiga and a few friends started throwing small parties and street promotions in Montreal that evolved into a cult following. Having bought DNA records in 1994, the nightclub SONA was then conceived in Montreal in 1996, with Tiga having a major role to play in the creation of the dance scene at the time.

=== 2000–2003 ===
In 2001, Tiga entered the studio with producer Zyntherius to record a rendition of Corey Hart's solo song, "Sunglasses at Night." The track also made it to number two on the UK Dance Chart, number 23 on the UK National Singles Chart, number one on the MTV Dance Chart for over six weeks and was in the Top 20 on Germany's National Singles Chart. Tiga also performed "Sunglasses at Night" with Zyntherius on Top of the Pops.

Tiga completed remixes for the likes of Martini Bros, Alpinestars, Linda Lamb, Crossover, FC Kahuna, Cabaret Voltaire, Telepopmusik, Felix da Housecat, Fischerspooner and Dannii Minogue in the years that followed the success of "Sunglasses at Night." In 2003, he commanded the attention of the scene with a mix CD for K7's legendary DJ-Kicks series.

=== 2006–2007 ===
In 2006 Tiga released Sexor, Good As Gold/Flexible Skulls would go on to be featured in EA's Need For Speed: Carbon, released October of that same year.

=== 2008–2009: Ciao! ===
The release of Tiga's second album, Ciao! took place in 2009.

=== 2010: Ivory Tower ===
In 2010, Tiga starred in Adam Traynor's Ivory Tower, along Chilly Gonzales and Peaches.

=== 2011–2012: Party's Over, Earth ===
ZZT released their debut album, Party's Over, Earth on Turbo Recordings in 2011.

Tiga's 2013 song "Plush" (Jacques Lu Cont remix) and "Bugatti" is the radio station Soulwax FM and Los Santos Underground Radio featured in the best-selling video game Grand Theft Auto V.

2016: No Fantasy Required

In 2016, Tiga released his third album No Fantasy Required on Ninja Tune.

=== Turbo Recordings ===
Tiga founded Turbo Recordings in Montreal in 1998. The label helped launch his own career, at the same time as being central in the success of acts such as Chromeo, Proxy and Azari & III. Other names on the label include Jesper Dahlbäck, Gingy & Bordello, Jori Hulkkonen, Duke Dumont, Brodinski, Zdar, D.I.M, Martini Bros, Stu Thousand VI, Boys Noize and Sei A.

== Awards and nominations ==
Antville Music Video Awards

The Antville Music Video Awards are online awards for the best music video and music video directors of the year. They were first awarded in 2005.

Year	Nominee / work	Award	Result
2005	"You Gonna Want Me"	Best Video	Nominated

D&AD Awards

Design and Art Direction (D&AD) is a British educational charity which exists to promote excellence in design and advertising.

Year	Nominee / work	Award	Result
2015	"Bugatti"	Editing	Wood Pencil

DanceStar USA Awards

Year	Nominee / work	Award	Result	Ref.
2004	DJ Kicks	Best Compilation	Nominated	

International Dance Music Awards

The Winter Music Conference (WMC) is a weeklong electronic music conference, held every March since 1985 in Miami Beach, Florida, United States. It is also known as the premiere platform for electronic dance music. The conference brings together professionals such as artists, DJs, record label representatives (A&R), producers, promoters, radio and the media for seminars and panel discussions. Thousands of attendees attend the Winter Music Conference each year.

Year	Nominee / work	Award	Result
2010	"Shoes"	Best Electro Track	Nominated
2014	"Let's Go Dancing"	Best Tech House/Techno Track	Won
2014	"Let's Go Dancing"	Best Underground Dance Track	Nominated
2014	Himself	Best Techno/Tech House DJ	Nominated
2015	"Bugatti"	Best Indie Dance Track	Won
2016	"Dancing Again"	Best Tech House/Techno Track	Nominated

Juno Awards

The Juno Awards are presented annually to Canadian musical artists and bands to acknowledge their artistic and technical achievements in all aspects of music.

Year	Nominee / work	Award	Result
2007	Sexor	Dance Recording of the Year	Won

Music Video Production Awards

The MVPA Awards are annually presented by a Los Angeles-based music trade organization to honor the year's best music videos.

Year	Nominee / work	Award	Result
2006	"You Gonna Want Me" (ft. Jake Shears)	Best Electronic Video	Nominated
2006	"Far From Home"	Best Electronic Video	Nominated

Music Video Festival

Year	Nominee / work	Award	Result	Ref.
2015	"Bugatti"	Best International Video	Nominated	

UK Music Video Awards

The UK Music Video Awards is an annual award ceremony founded in 2008 to recognise creativity, technical excellence and innovation in music videos and moving images for music.

Year	Nominee / work	Award	Result
2009	"Shoes"	Best Dance Video	Nominated
2015	"Bugatti"	Best Dance Video	Won
2015	"Bugatti"	Best Art Direction & Design	Won
2015	"Bugatti"	Best Styling	Nominated
2015	"Bugatti"	Best Editing	Nominated

== My Name Is Tiga ==
“My Name is Tiga" is the name of Tiga's BBC Radio 6 show that features unreleased exclusive music and classic dance tracks. Tiga's broadcasting career began with the 90s CKUT terrestrial radio show "The Tiga and Gnat Show."

== Last Party on Earth ==
Last Party on Earth is the name of Tiga's podcast, which launched in summer 2019 on Apple Music, SoundCloud, and Spotify.

- Episode 1: Kölsch
- Episode 2: Gerd Janson
- Episode 3: Annie Mac
- Episode 4: Pete Tong
- Episode 5: Carl Cox
- Episode 6: Seth Troxler
- Episode 7: Four Tet
- Episode 8: Boys Noize
- Episode 9: Erol Alkan
- Episode 10: Miss Kittin
- Episode 11: Benji B
- Episode 12: Richard Russell
- Episode 13: 2manydjs
- Episode 14: Chilly Gonzales
- Episode 15: Trevor Jackson
- Episode 16: Nick Rhodes
- Episode 17: Charlotte de Witte
- Episode 18: DJ Hell
- Episode 19: Diplo
- Episode 20: Mark Ronson
- Episode 21: The Blessed Madonna
- Episode 22: Dillon Francis
- Episode 23: Danny Tenaglia
- Episode 24: Jeff Mills
- Episode 25: Richie Hawtin

== Discography ==
=== Solo albums ===
- Sexor (2006)
- Ciao! (2009)
- No Fantasy Required (2016)
- Hotlife (2026)

=== with Hudson Mohawke ===
- L'Ecstasy (2023)

=== DJ mix compilations ===
- Montreal Mix Sessions Vol. 1 (1998)
- Mixed Emotions: Montreal Mix Sessions Vol. 5 (2000)
- American Gigolo (2001)
- DJ-Kicks: Tiga (2002)
- INTHEMIX.05 (2005)
- Tiga: Non Stop (2012)

=== Singles ===
- "Sunglasses at Night" (2001), with Jori Hulkkonen, as Tiga & Zyntherius (UK No. 25)
- "TGV EP" (2002), as TGV, with Mateo Murphy
- "DJ-Kicks Promo" (2002), with Mateo Murphy
- "Running out of Time EP" (2003), as TGV, with Mateo Murphy
- "Hot in Herre" (2003), with Mateo Murphy and Jake Shears, (UK No. 46)
- "Burning Down" (2003), with Richard X
- "Pleasure from the Bass" (2004), with Jesper Dahlbäck, (UK No. 57)
- "Louder than a Bomb" (2005), with Jesper Dahlbäck
- "You Gonna Want Me" (2005), with Soulwax and Jake Shears, (UK No. 64, AUS No. 65)
- "Good as Gold" (2005), with Soulwax
- "Far From Home" (2006), (UK No. 65, AUS No. 69)
- "3 Weeks" (2006), with remixes by Jesper Dahlbäck, Booka Shade and Troy Pierce
- "Move My Body" (2006) including the original Only4Erol mix and a Boys Noize remix.
- "Lower State of Consciousness" (2007) as ZZT with Zombie Nation, including Justice remix.
- "Mind Dimension" (2008) (featuring special guest Jori Hulkkonen)
- "The Worm" (2008), as ZZT with Zombie Nation
- "Shoes" (2009) (featuring special guests Soulwax & Gonzales)
- "What You Need" (2009)
- "Beep Beep Beep" (2009)
- "Sex 'O Clock" (2010)
- "ZZafrika" (2010), as ZZT with Zombie Nation
- "Hands Up" (2010), as Massimo Massivi with Jesper Dahlbäck
- "Girl at a Party with Siren" (2011), as The Dove with Jesper Dahlbäck
- "Vulkan Alarm!" (2011), as ZZT with Zombie Nation
- "Partys Over Los Angeles" (2011), as ZZT with Zombie Nation
- "Plush" (2012)
- "Let's Go Dancing" (2013), with Audion
- "Fever" (2014), with Audion
- "Bugatti" (2014)
- "Bugatti" (Remix featuring Pusha T) (2014)
- "Don't Break My Heart" (2015)
- "Planet E" (2016)
- "Woke" (2017)
- 'Stay Cool" (2018)
- "HAL" with Kolsch (2018)
- "Blessed EP Part 1" with The Martinez Brothers plus "Blessed / Cleopatra Remixes" featuring remixes from Virgil Abloh and Ricardo Villalobos (2018/2019)

=== Remixes ===
- Bran Van 3000 – "Drinking in L.A." (Tiga, Mateo and Delage's Sinking in LA Dub)
- Märtini Brös. – "Flash" (Tiga's Acid Flashback mix)
- Komma 8 Komma 1 – "Popmusic" (TGV Vocal mix)
- The Devils – "Come Alive" (Tiga Swears Lies Remix)
- LCD Soundsystem – "Beat Connection" (Tiga Edit)
- FC Kahuna – "Machine Says Yes" (Tiga's Unreleased Mix)
- Felix Da Housecat featuring Miss Kittin – "Madame Hollywood" (Tiga's Mister Hollywood Version)
- FPU – "Ocean Drive" (Tiga's White Linen Vox)
- Cabaret Voltaire – "Nag Nag Nag" (Tiga & Zyntherius Radio mix)
- Alpinestars – "Snow Patrol" (Tiga TGV Disco Patrol dub)
- Dannii Minogue – "Put The Needle On It" (Tiga's Cookies Dub Edit)
- Linda Lamb – "Hot Room" (Tiga remix)
- FPU – "Race Car" (TGV Join The Race Remix) / (TGV Dub)
- Alexkid – "Come With Me" (Tiga vs Etoy Acideathravefuckinglive mix)
- Scissor Sisters – "Comfortably Numb" (Tiga remix) / (Tiga Dub)
- Märtini Brös. – "Flash" (Tiga's Unholy Trinity Mix)
- Télépopmusik – "Breathe" (TGV Remix)
- The Neon Judgement – "TV Treated" (Tiga's Recovered Vox) / (Tiga's Dub for Ivan)
- Crossover – "Phostographt" (Tiga's Revenge)
- Märtini Brös. – "Big and Dirty" (Tiga Remix)
- Peaches – "Shake Yer Dix" (Tiga's Where Were You in '92 Remix) / (Tiga's Where Were You in '92 Instrumental mix)
- Seelenluft – "I Can See Clearly Now" (Tiga Remix)
- Drama Society feat. Turner – "Crying Hero" (Tiga Remix)
- Junior Jack feat. Robert Smith – "Da Hype" (Tiga remix)
- Drinking Electricity – "Breakout" (Tiga edit)
- La Oreja de Van Gogh – "Bonustrack" (Tiga's Vocal Mix)
- Soulwax – "E Talking" (Tiga's Disco Drama remix)
- Tomas Andersson – "Washing Up" (Tiga's Na Na Na Na Na Remix)
- Zdar – "Don't U Want" (Tiga remix)
- LCD Soundsystem – "Tribulations" (Tiga's Out of the Trance Closet mix)
- The Kills – "The Good Ones" (Tiga Remix)
- Mylo – "Muscle Car" (Tiga remix)
- Depeche Mode – "Shake The Disease" (Tiga Remix)
- Moby – "Where You End" (Tiga's All That I Need Is To Be Sampled mix) / (Tiga's All That I Need Is To Be Dubbed mix)
- Depeche Mode – "Suffer Well" (Tiga Remix)
- Pet Shop Boys – "Minimal" (Tiga's M-I-N-I-M-A-L Remix) / (Tiga's M-I-N-I-M-A-L Dub)
- Coldcut ft. Robert Owens – "Walk A Mile In My Shoes" (Tiga Mix)
- The Killers – "Bones" (Tiga Mix)
- Alter Ego – "Gary" (Tiga's Italia 90 Mix)
- Fever Ray – "Triangle Walks" (Tiga's 1-2-3-4 Remix)
- Miike Snow – "Black & Blue" (Tiga Remix)
- The Prodigy – "Thunder" (Tiga Remix)
- Boys Noize – "Transmission" (Tiga Remix)
- Jamie Lidell – "I Wanna Be Your Telephone" (Tiga's Party Like It's 1990 Remix)
- The xx – "Shelter" (Tiga Remix)
- LCD Soundsystem – "I Can Change" (Tiga Remix)
- Friendly Fires – "Blue Cassette" (Tiga Remix)
- Azari & III – "Reckless (With Your Love)" (Tiga Remix)
- Footprintz – "Dangers of the Mouth" (Tiga Remix)
- Justice – "Canon" (Tiga Remix)
- Iggy Azalea – "Black Widow (feat. Rita Ora)" (Tiga Remix)
- Disclosure – "Magnets (feat. Lorde)" (Tiga Remix)

== Filmography ==
Year	Title	Role	Notes
2010	Ivory Tower	Thadeus Graves	Actor, writer
