= Spektrum (band) =

Spektrum is a London-based house act consisting of:

- Gabriel Olegavich (synths, programming and vocals), who was born in South East London and is based in Hackney;
- Lola Olafisoye (vocals), from North London;
- Isaac Tucker (drums) from New Zealand;
- Teia Williams (bass), a Maori also from New Zealand.

The band had a No. 1 song on the UK Dance Chart in 2007, with the Dirty South remix of their 2004 track, "Kinda New". The same track had peaked at No. 70 on the UK Singles Chart in September 2004.
