= Märtini Brös =

German musical duo

Märtini Brös.
- Origin: Berlin, Germany
- Genres: Dance, Indietronic
- Years active: 1998–present
- Labels: Poker Flat Recordings Dessous Recordings; FromWithIn Rec. Mole Listening Pearls BPitch Control
- Members: Clemens Kahlcke; Mike Vamp
- Website: Official Site

Märtini Brös (a.k.a. Maertini Broes) is a German indietronic dance musical duo from Berlin, who have toured extensively throughout Europe and overseas. The project is a collaboration between DJ Clé (born in East Berlin) and Mike Vamp (born in Frankfurt). Both became established on the electronic music scene in Berlin during the 1980s and 1990s as Djs and remixers. The duo first worked together in 1997 at the Berlin nightclub E-Werk as part of an effort to translate the opera Don Giovanni into an electronic version.

Their sound incorporates techno and house combined with lyrics sung in German and English. As a live act the band usually performs with sequencers and electric guitars.

The band's The MB Factor album received a four-star rating from The Skinny.

== Remixes ==
Märtini Brös (a.k.a. Maertini Broes) have provided remixes for numerous artists; the most significant include Missy Queen's Gonna Die by Tok Tok with Soffy O, Bleib Geschmeidig by 2raumwohnung and Filthy and Georgeous by Scissor Sisters. Tiga has used several tracks on his progressive house compilations on Turbo Recordings, including DJ-Kicks.

== Discography ==
=== Singles and EPs ===
| Date | Release |
|---|---|
| 1998 | "Material Love" |
| 1999 | "Babyhaze" |
| 2000 | "Tanzen" |
| 2001 | "Flash" |
| 2002 | "Dance like it's OK" |
| 2002 | "The Biggest Fan" |
| 2003 | "Boy/Girl" |
| 2003 | "HOT" |
| 2004 | "Love The Machines" |
| 2004 | "Big and dirty" |
| 2004 | "She's Heavy Metal" |
| 2005 | "Tracks from the Lab pt1" |
| 2005 | "Tracks from the Lab pt2" |
| 2006 | "Tracks from the Lab pt3" |
| 2007 | "From Buleaux" |

=== Albums ===
| Date | Release |
|---|---|
| 2002 | "Pläy" |
| 2004 | "Love The Machines" |
| 2008 | "The MB Factor" |
| 2011 | "Moved By Mountains" |
| 2012 | "Starshine" |
