= Jesper Dahlbäck =

Swedish techno DJ and producer

- Also known as: ADJD (with Alexi Delano), Lenk, The Persuader, Dahlback, Dick Track, Faxid, Groove Machine, Janne Me' Amazonen, The Pinguin Man oder DK (with Thomas Krome)
- Born: Jesper Erik Mathias Dahlbäck; 14 October 1974 (age 51)
- Origin: Stockholm, Sweden
- Genres: Techno, house, tech house, trance
- Years active: 1997-2007
- Labels: Svek, Blank LTD, DK Records, Harthouse
- Website: www.jesperdahlback.com

Jesper Erik Mathias Dahlbäck (born October 14, 1974) is a Swedish techno DJ and producer. Besides his real name, he has used various stage names and pseudonyms such as Lenk, Dahlback, Dick Track, Faxid, Groove Machine, Janne Me' Amazonen, The Pinguin Man oder DK (with Thomas Krome). Hugg & Pepp / Pepp & Kaliber are names of duos for his common collaborative work with his cousin John Dahlbäck. ADJD is used for his collaborations with Alexi Delano. He also uses the names The Persuader and Sunday Brunch together with Jean-Luis Huhta.

He started producing tracks at 17 influenced by the Detroit techno and artists from UK and Germany. In 1993, he founded the Globe Studios together with Adam Beyer and Peter Benisch. He distributed tracks through Planet Rhythm. Working with Cari Lekebusch and Adam Beyer, he gained notoriety in Sweden and throughout Europe with his versatile house music through the specialized label Svek becoming a prominent producer with them. In 1998 and 2001, the label won Swedish Grammy music prize nominations. In 2004, he had an international hit with Canadian producer Tiga called "Pleasure from the Bass". Jesper also co-produced Tiga's 2005 album Sexor alongside Jori Hulkkonen and Soulwax.

More recently, he has started releasing more classical tracks with Acidsounds. Struggling with tinnitus, he has withdrawn from public performances concentrating on music production work.

== Discography ==
- 1997: "Midnight Express" (12") [Svek]
- 1997: "The Persuader" (12") [Svek]
- 1997: "With Compliments" (12") [Svek]
- 1998: JD's Power Tools Vol. I (12") [Blank LTD]
- 1999: "Nueva York" (12") [Blank LTD]
- 2000: "Sand & Vatten" (12") [Svek]
- 2001: JD's Power Tools Vol. II (12") [Blank LTD]
- 2001: Sommar EP (12") [Svek]
- 2003: Hans EP (12") [Jericho]
- 2003: Summer Jam Madness EP (12") [20:20 Vision]
- 2004: "Finnish Folksong" (12") [Special Needs Recordings]
- 2004: JD's Acid Power (12") [Blank LTD]
- 2004: "Machine Dance" (12") [DK Records]
- 2004: "Number in Between" (12") [Soma Quality Recordings]
- 2005: "Polyhouse" (12") [DK Records]
- 2006: "As If Dubs" (12") [Mad Eye]
- 2007: ADJDs's Chronicle of the Urban Dwellers (album) [Harthouse]
