= Jori Hulkkonen =

Finnish musician and DJ

Jori Hulkkonen (born 28 September 1973) is a Finnish DJ and a producer of house music, originally from Kemi, Finland. Hulkkonen started his career in the early 1990s when he worked with Jukka Hautamäki, Tuomas Salmela and Ari Ruokamo for their own label Lumi Records. In 1996 Hulkkonen signed a record deal with French record label F Communications; his debut album of the same year was called Selkäsaari Tracks. Internationally, Hulkkonen's most popular recording is the single Sunglasses at Night, a version of Corey Hart's 1980s hit, created together with Canadian producer Tiga. His most recent solo full-length Dualizm, released in 2005, featured collaborations with John Foxx, Nick Triani, Tiga, Jerry Valuri, and José González. Following up on the success of the Lo-Fiction single on Dualizm on which they collaborated, Jori began a synth-pop side project with Jerry Valuri called Processory, which released its self-titled debut in February 2007.

Jori Hulkkonen has also released records under such aliases as Zyntherius, Eternal Boyman, Bobby Forrester and Jii Hoo. He has worked on remixes to Telepopmusik's second single Love Can Damage Your Health. He has also featured his own radio shows on Finnish stations Radiomafia and YleX. Starting from January 2012 Jori has had biweekly radioshow on Bassoradio.
