= Get Physical Music =

German electronic music record label

Get Physical Music is a Berlin-based electronic music record label founded in 2002 by M.A.N.D.Y. (Patrick Bodmer & Philipp Jung), DJ T (Thomas Koch) and Booka Shade (Walter Merziger, Arno Kammermeier & Peter Hayo). They were DJ Magazine's "Label of the Year" for 2005. In 2006 Pitchfork Media said that the label "increasingly resembles early Warp in its elevation of club dynamics to a steely art form."
