= Ana Silvera =

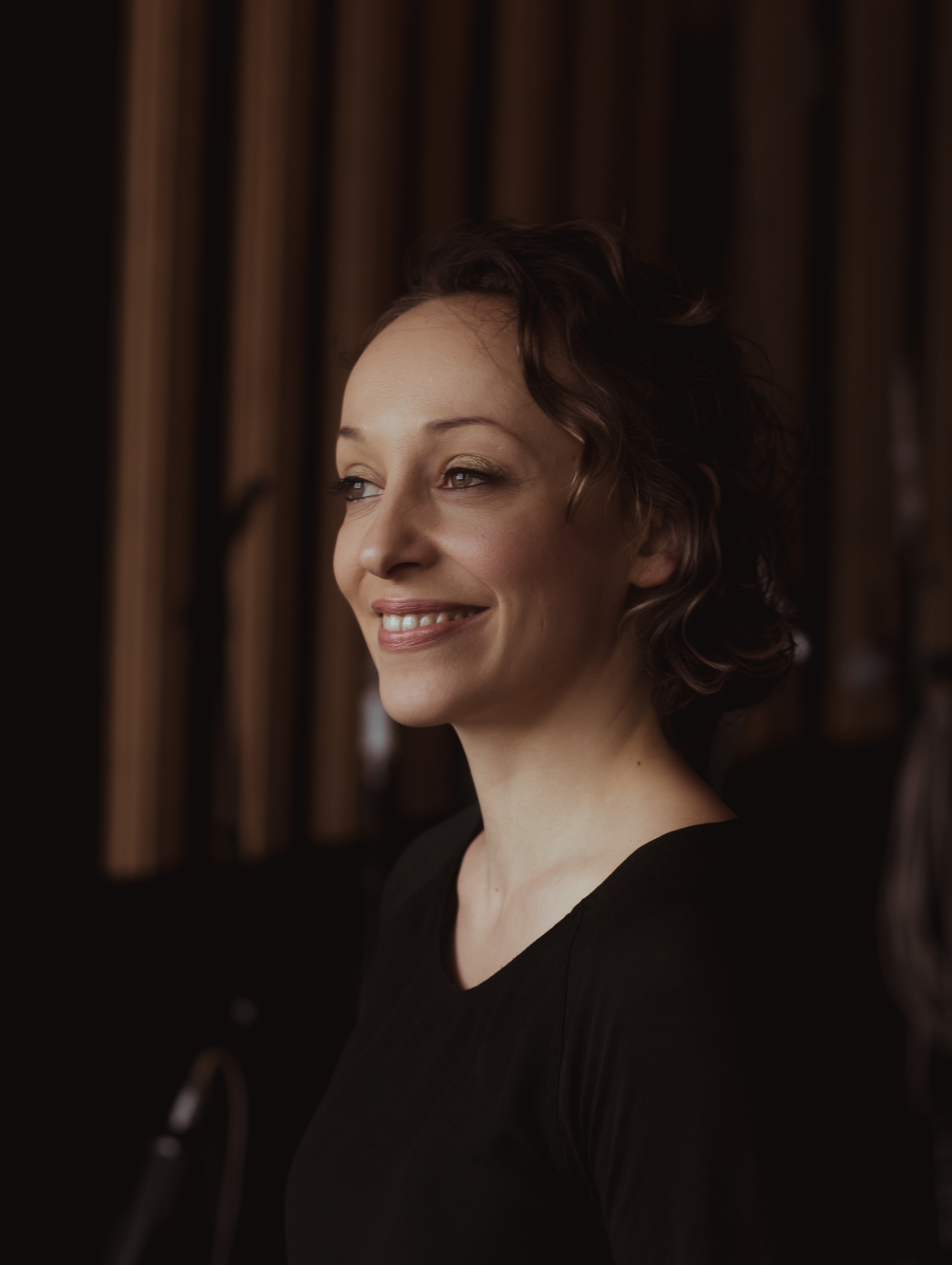
- Ana Silvera. Photo by: Liv Anastasia

Background information
- Born: London, England
- Genres: Alternative, Experimental Songwriting
- Occupations: Singer; songwriter; composer
- Instruments: piano, guitar, harmonium
- Years active: 2007–present
- Website: http://www.anasilvera.com

Ana Silvera is an British songwriter and composer.

Silvera's solo music spans alternative and experimental songwriting, but draws on diverse genres including jazz, pop and contemporary classical music. As a composer, she has been commissioned to write work for ballet, choir, instrumental ensemble and theatre including for Concerto Caledonia, Estonian Television Girls Choir and Royal Ballet.

Her lyrics often draw inspiration from literature, poetry and folklore.

Silvera's recordings have, as of 2018, been added to the Sound Archive at the British Library.

To date, as a solo artist Silvera has released two studio albums, The Aviary (2012), The Fabulist (2022) and a live album, Oracles (2018), which was listed on The Guardian Critics Pick List, and three EPs: Arcana - A Winter EP (2017), Light, Console Me (2020), which features Gambian kora player Sefo Kanuteh, and Gift (2021).

She has performed and recorded with a number of notable artists including Imogen Heap, Olivia Chaney, Jim Moray, Bill Laurance, Jasper Høiby, Alan Hampton, Maya Youssef, Laura Moody, Yo Zushi, Mara Carlyle, Josephine Stephenson, Daughter, Hungarian poet George Szirtes and British composers Emily Hall and Max de Wardener

She is also an interpreter of traditional Ladino song and traces her lineage back to Sephardi Jews who escaped Iberia as refugees during the religious conquests of the 1500s, and later settled in the Ottoman Empire. She has released modern interpretations of Ladino music under the name Yja as part of a duo with cellist Francesca Ter-Berg. and in her duo, Songs We Carry alongside Palestinian oud player Saied Silbak. As of 2020, Silvera holds both British and Portuguese nationality, due to right of return laws.

== Early life ==
Silvera grew up in Crouch End, London. At the age of 12, she successfully auditioned for a solo role in the Engelbert Humperdinck opera Königskinder in an English National Opera production conducted by Mark Elder and directed by David Pountney. The performance of the production was also broadcast on BBC Radio 3. Following this role, she was selected to sing as part of the children's chorus in Richard Strauss' opera, Die Frau ohne Schatten at the Royal Opera House. Silvera was subsequently awarded a scholarship to study voice and piano at Guildhall School of Music where she studied under David Joyner.

She attended South Hampstead High School and is an alumnus of University College London.

== Releases ==
=== Albums ===
==== The Aviary (2012) ====
Ana Silvera's debut album, The Aviary, was in March 2012. The Aviary was produced by Ray Singer (Peter Sarstedt) and Brad Albetta (Martha Wainwright, Teddy Thompson) and violinist/arranger Maxim Moston (Antony & the Johnsons, Rufus Wainwright). The album was well-received: Arwa Haider of METRO wrote, "there's both a lavish, vivid imagination and an intense intimacy at play in the music of Ana Silvera... altogether these are haunting, grown-up fairytales" and The Word described The Aviary as a collection of "dark and delicious torchsongs" and featured track 10, 'Coronation Dance' on their covermount CD. The Aviary was released as a CD and digital download on KMC Records.

==== Oracles - live album (2018) ====
In 2015, Silvera recorded her seven part song-cycle in a series of live recordings over three nights. The performance featuring noted musicians such as pianist Bill Laurance (of Snarky Puppy) double bassist Jasper Høiby of Phronesis and singer/composer Josephine Stephenson. The song cycle was recorded at Roundhouse Studio Theatre and was released as vinyl, CD and digital download in July 2018 on Gearbox Records. The release was listed on The Guardian Critics Pick List (selected by journalist Charlotte Richardson Andrews) the same year, and was praised by writer Alex Preston on BBC Radio 4's Saturday Review as being "some of the most beautiful music I’ve ever heard...intelligent, lyrically complex and interesting".

==== The Fabulist (2022) ====
The Fabulist was recorded with producer and multi-instrumentalist Gerry Diver and features collaborators such as double bassist Jasper Høiby (Phronesis, Planet B) and LA-based singer-songwriter Alan Hampton (Fiona Apple, Andrew Bird) among others. The album title, meaning ‘teller of fables’, speaks to Ana’s love of story-telling, with the songs both drawing on the lives of “imagined others” as well as plumbing the depths of her own emotional experiences. ‘Ghosts’, for instance, describes Ana’s witnessing of her teenage brother’s descent into psychosis over the course of a sweltering London summer: “You were dumbstruck by the ghosts / who waltzed your body down the hall”; ‘Red Balloon’ describes the dizzying, disorienting pull of a forbidden yet magnetic attraction replete with off-kilter drums, soaring violins and the tender swells of Adrian Lever’s guitar pedals; and ‘Early Frost’, a duet with Alan Hampton, tells the story of a couple living a seemingly picture-perfect life – marriage, a house, a perfectly tended garden – but “like a hidden fault on an iced-up lake / it’s the smallest things that can make it break”. The album was released to positive reviews; it was selected as a New and Notable release by Bandcamp Editorial who said: "hushed and riveting, the new LP from Ana Silvera centers her expressive voice against quietly glowing guitars” and Folk Radio UK who described it as '"extraordinary... Silvera has an uncanny ability to combine discomfort with beauty, strangeness with simplicity".

=== Solo EPs ===
==== Arcana - A Winter EP (2017) ====
In 2017, Silvera released a collection of original and traditional winter songs featuring Danish musicians Jasper Høiby (bass), Bjarke Falgren (strings), Jacob Smedegaard (drums), Signe Trylle (vox) and British musician Adrian Lever (Bulgarian tambura). It is available as a digital download and 500 limited edition CDs were also released. The EP was released on Mirabeau Recordings, Silvera's own imprint.

==== Light, Console Me (2020) ====
Silvera was commissioned by arts organisation Arts La'Olam to compose a piece reflecting on the Mourner's Kaddish, as part of a COVID-19 legacy commission funded by Arts Council England. The resulting three-song piece, featuring kora player Sefo Kanuteh, is composed of three movements: 'Departing', 'Awaiting', 'Mourning'. The piece was released on Mirabeau Recordings, Silvera's own imprint.

==== Gift (2021) ====
Gift is a three-song release of songs composed or arranged on harmonium. The EP features a re-recorded version of 'Exile', a song commissioned by BBC Radio 3's The Verb in 2020. This song is inspired by Iranian-American poet Sholeh Wolpé's work, 'The World Grows Blackthorn Walls'. Gift was released on Mirabeau Recordings, Silvera's own imprint.

== Commissions ==
=== Choral work ===
==== Oracles (2012) ====
Oracles was originally commissioned by Marcus Davey, the artistic director of London's Roundhouse venue, as a choral piece to be performed with Roundhouse Experimental Choir. The piece was written as a response to the recent death of Silvera's brother, Daniel, in a psychiatric care home. Silvera says, "I wrote ‘Oracles’ in a state of absolute urgency and emergency – it felt like I had been buried in the ground myself, and writing this music was a small pocket of air, my chance to breathe again". Compositionally, the piece follows the arc of a ‘quest’ – a folk tale that begins with a search for a tangible or symbolic goal and ends with a triumphant return home. Silvera writes, "on reflection, I see my quest was to fathom this experience and - though it no longer existed in the familial sense of the word - to find my own way back home". ‘Skeleton Song’, an Inuit-myth inspired tune about a woman who is sung back to life, is a paean to the female figures surrounding Silvera who "painstakingly pieced me together again". The final song, ‘Catherine Wheels’ celebrates "the kind of earth-bound, steadfast love" that allowed Silvera to finally reckon with her past and come to terms with the present.

==== Step Onto The Ground, Dear Brother (2012) ====
Following the success of "Oracles" at the Roundhouse, Silvera was commissioned as part of the venue's REVERB festival to compose an original work for the Estonian Television Girls Choir, conducted by Aarne Saluveer. The piece, entitled "Step Onto The Ground, Dear Brother" (in Estonian, "Tule Maale, Armas Veli") draws on Estonian folklore and ancient Finno-Ugric texts, and was performed at the Roundhouse and at the Sage Gateshead as a co-headline with Imogen Heap and the Holst Singers. The performance was live streamed by The Guardian. The piece was divided into four parts: 'Mystery', 'War', 'Death' and 'Love' with electronic soundscapes created by composer Max de Wardener. She also duetted with Imogen Heap on her song, Hide and Seek, and Heap duetted on a song of Silvera's, entitled 'Letter from New York'. Critic Igor Toronyi-Lalic of The Arts Desk described the piece (alongside Oracles) as "two stunning folkloric sages" and wrote "Silvera's voice, which has a Björk-like spontaneity - an ability to be gritty and fragile one minute, warm, rich and ripe the next - bounced beautifully off the chamber ensemble (cello, violin, piano and percussion) and the glassy choir".

=== Ballet ===
==== Cassandra - Royal Ballet (2014) ====
Silvera was commissioned in 2013 by the Royal Opera House to create, compose and perform in a new work for Royal Ballet alongside choreographer Ludovic Ondiviela and film maker Kate Church, entitled "Cassandra". It premiered on 30 October 2014 at the Linbury Theatre, Royal Opera House and starred soloist Olivia Cowley as the main character, replacing principal ballerina Lauren Cuthbertson who was injured shortly before the show. It was described as "a haunting and ethereal theatrical experience depicted with beautiful sensitivity the onset of psychotic illness in a young woman" by The BMJ and The Arts Desk wrote: "its through-composed score by Ana Silvera, who also takes a performing role as a singer is attractively varied, constantly engaging". Silvera also spoke about her own direct experiences with the psychiatric system in a Royal Opera House podcast entitled "Can the arts help people better understand mental illness?" alongside psychiatrist Dr Mark Salter.

=== Radio commissions ===
==== Late Junction Sessions - BBC Radio 3 (2014) ====
Silvera was commissioned to compose a new work for herself, qanun player Maya Youssef and cellist/vocalist Laura Moody, to be recorded at the BBC's Maida Vale Studios.The resulting piece was entitled 'Greenwich Pier'. She also performed on Youssef's composition, 'Syrian Dreams' and Moody's composition, 'Dark Days'. All three songs were broadcast on BBC Radio 3's Late Junction with Max Reinhardt. in 2016, 'Greenwich Pier' was selected by curator Nick Luscombe to be included on a compilation of the best of Late Junction sessions. In a review of the release, Richard Foster of The Quietus wrote: "[Ana Silvera's] 'Greenwich Pier' [is] a wonderful piece of modern folk... its deftness and surety of touch means it’s damned pleasing".

==== The Verb - BBC Radio 3 (2020) ====
In February 2020, Silvera was asked to compose a song for BBC Radio 3's spoken word show, The Verb, inspired by the new anthology "The Heart of A Stranger" edited by poet André Nafis-Sahely. She performed the song, "Exile" - whose opening line was inspired by Iranian poet Sholeh Wolpé's 'The World Grows Blackthorn Walls' and also joined the roundtable discussion about the idea of 'exile' alongside presenter Ian McMillan and poets André Nafis-Sahely, Mina Gorji, John McAuliffe and Igor Klikovac. 'Exile' was subsequently selected for play on BBC Radio 4's Pick of the Week.

=== Theatre ===
==== Lost and Found ====
In 2016, Silvera was invited by BAFTA award-winning filmmaker Sheila Hayman to work with six members of the Write to Life group that is part of the UK-wide Freedom from Torture organisation. The mission was to work with the group, alongside dramaturge Christine Bacon to create a musical and spoken word piece about the experiences of the group members, all of whom were torture survivors from different countries including Burundi, Uganda and Iran. Over a period of months, Silvera and the group devised sketches of lyrics and tunes for the show, sometimes drawing on traditional music from their homelands, but most of the time creating original songs which related to different aspects of their past and present lives. Silvera then worked this into a fully composed 35 minute piece entitled "Lost and Found", which the group performed at the Roundhouse Studio Theatre on 2 September 2016. The piece was reprised in 2017 as part of Refugee Week and performed in at the Victoria & Albert Museum.

==== What Do I Know? ====
In 2018, Silvera collaborated again with dramaturge Christine Bacon on her new work, "What Do I Know?", a new performance piece by ice&fire human rights theatre company looking at the effects of the current war in Yemen, taking inspiration from the poetry of Amina Atiq and the reflections and realities of Khaled Ahmed, a young, self-taught English teacher living in Yemen. Silvera created soundscapes and music for the piece. It premiered at Liverpool Arab Arts Festival in the Music Room, Royal Liverpool Philharmonic on 8 July 2018.

==== The Offing ====
In 2021, Silvera was commissioned to compose a score of re-arranged folk and original music for the theatre adaptation of The Times best-selling book of the same name by Ben Myers. The recordings featured violinist Aidan O'Rourke and concertina player Rob Harbron. The show premiered in October 2021 at the Stephen Joseph Theatre, Scarborough before being transferred to Newcastle Live.

== Discography ==
=== Solo albums and EPs ===
- 2022 The Fabulist (Mirabeau Recordings) - CD and digital release
- 2021 Gift (Mirabeau Recordings) - digital release
- 2020 Light, Console Me (Mirabeau Recordings) - digital release
- 2018 Oracles (Gearbox Records) - vinyl, CD and digital release
- 2017 Arcana - A Winter EP (Mirabeau Recordings) - limited edition CD and digital release
- 2012 The Aviary (Karamel Music Collective) - CD and digital release

=== Solo singles ===
- 2020 Jóga (Björk cover) - digital release

=== Other singles ===
- 2020 La Serena (single) - as duo Yja with cellist Francesca Ter-Berg, this traditional Ladino song was also featured Jasper Høiby and Chris Vatalaro.

=== Album collaborations ===
- 2016 Unpopular Music - Late Junction Sessions (album) - Silvera's song, Greenwich Pier, recorded with qanun player Maya Youssef and cellist Laura Moody, appears on this compilation. Released as vinyl (Gearbox Records) and digital download.
- 2015 Purcell's Revenge...Sweeter than Roses? with Concerto Caledonia (Delphian Records) - CD and digital download

=== As featured artist ===
- 2021 Emily Hall Songbook (nearfield) - with Allan Clayton, Olivia Chaney, Hazel Askew and Sarah Nicolls
- 2020 Inside I'll Sing (Erased Tapes) - Shards x Isolation Choir with Douglas Dare, Joe Newman (Alt-J), Jonathan Donahue (Mercury Rev), Anna Meredith, Nico Muhly, Luke Howard, Hatis Noit.
- 2018 All I Wanted (Live at Asylum Chapel) (4AD) - Daughter as part of accompanying vocal quartet with Josephine Stephenson, Kate Huggett, Lucy Parnell
- 2016 Coventry Carol (Bedroom Community) - with Strange Boy and Mara Carylye (released as part of Yuletide Compilation)
