= Now Is Early =

Studio album by Nicolette
- Released: 27 April 1992
- Recorded: 1990–92
- Genre: Breakbeat hardcore; breakbeat; jungle; rave
- Length: 50:31
- Label: Shut Up and Dance
- Producer: Shut Up and Dance

Nicolette chronology
Now Is Early (1992)	Let No-One Live Rent Free in Your Head (1996)

Singles from Now Is Early
- 1. "School of the World" / "Single Minded People" Released: November 1990; 2. "Waking Up" Released: March 1991; 3. "O Si Nene" Released: 1991; 4. "Wicked Mathematics" Released: 1992

Now Is Early is the debut studio album by Scottish singer Nicolette, produced by English electronic duo Shut Up and Dance and released in April 1992 by the duo's label of the same name. It follows a string of popular underground singles in the early 1990s that applied the singer's jazz-styled vocals to Shut Up and Dance's early experiments in breakbeat hardcore, with songs from these singles featuring on the record. Stylistically, the record profiles Shut Up and Dance's spacious, breakbeat-driven sound, contrasted with Nicolette's smooth scat-style singing. For the album, the singer wrote torch songs in a stream of consciousness style and explored universal themes.

An unusually melodic, intimate release for the hard-edged Shut Up and Dance label, Now Is Early drew attention from music critics for its unique sound, but was deemed too unusual for mainstream appeal. Regarded as an early example of a vocal rave album, it has since been regarded by some critics as a "lost" classic and forerunner to jungle music. It was re-released in 1997 by Studio !K7, containing other material from the period as bonus tracks.

== Background and production ==
Born in Scotland, Nicolette was raised on a variety of musical styles by her parents. As an adult, she spent two years in Paris, France, giving her what she described as a "fresh perspective on ballads and mood music", before a move to Wales saw her join her first band, Calliope. Later moving to London, she searched for a record deal and discovered a newspaper advert from electronic duo Shut Up and Dance, consisting of members PJ and Smiley, who were looking for a singer. She auditioned and improvised her jazz-styled vocals over the duo's dance instrumentals; they then signed her to their eponymous label Shut Up and Dance, launched in 1989. Nicolette reflected that she was initially unsure what the duo "were about," but enjoyed their productions without being able to "pinpoint exactly what it was," explaining: "I was looking for some hard-edged production to balance my sound and in the end the two things – their beats and my melodies – have worked closely together. But not too close."

Her debut single, a double A-side of "School of the World" and "Single Minded People", was released in November 1990, becoming one of the label's first two singles. Writer Joe Muggs describes both songs as pivotal for showing breakbeat hardcore being "born out of house, hip hop and techno", but noted that Nicolette's "velvet" jazz harmonies provided an unlikely contrast. Nicolette said that she added her vocals to the backing tracks after months of indecision as to what would fit, and that after the single's release, the duo kept sending her tracks which she wrote lyrics for "in a very casual way". Released in March 1991, her second single "Waking Up" defined the singer's sound most clearly, according to Kodwo Eshun, due to its distinctive "syntactic swerve, instant hooks and sparse backdrop". According to Peter Shapiro, "Single Minded People" and "Waking Up" became "rave standards" and were among the earliest tracks to contain hardcore's "trademark speeded-up breaks."

Having built up underground momentum with her "left-field club cuts", including with the further single "Wicked Mathematics" (1992), Nicolette said that the idea to release an album came naturally to PJ and Smiley and herself. She later explained: "I just thought of myself as a musician doing my own thing, that happened to be within those circumstances. I knew that I wasn't just going to keep [releasing singles] because that's not what being a musician is about as far as I'm concerned. Making an album was the most logical thing." Now Is Early includes songs from all four of Nicolette's previous singles, encapsulating her progression one disc, and was written by Nicolette with Shut Up and Dance, while the latter handled production and arrangement. According to Eshun, the album's low budget and independent label status afforded Nicolette "room to experiment".

== Composition ==
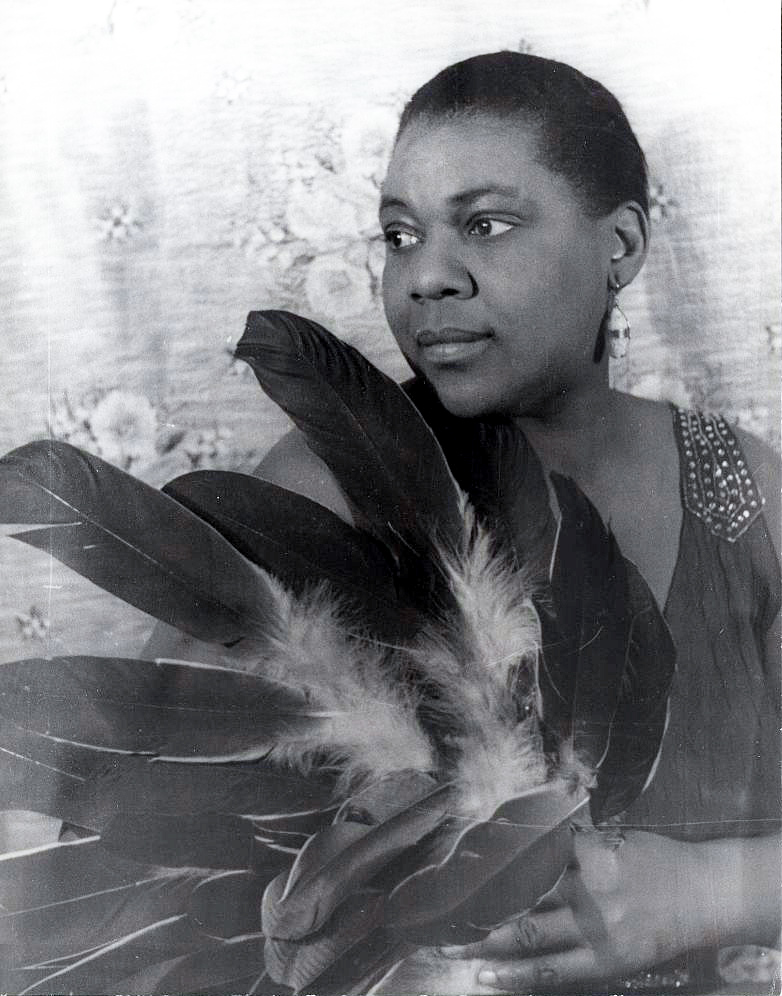
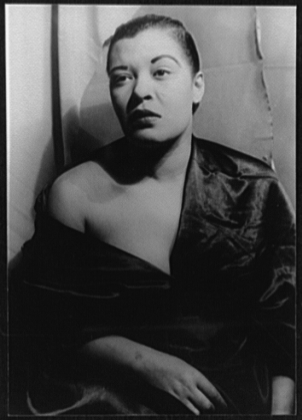
Nicolette's singing drew comparisons to Bessie Smith and Billie Holiday (pictured)

Now Is Early places Nicolette's unique, soulful voice atop Shut Up & Dance's hardcore production. According to Nicolette at the time of release, the album incorporates "every type of music I've ever listened to," including the music her father raised her on, such as classical music, gospel, African music and Broadway musicals. She nonetheless said that she saw herself as "a dance act, among many things." The production is breakbeat-driven; some songs feature broken beats, such as "Dove Song", while others feature minimal beats, including "No Government". By contrast, Nicolette's voice is smooth and gentle, with a scat style compared by music critics to Bessie Smith and "Billie Holiday on acid". Nicolette said of her sound: "Calling it jazz is too obvious. Something about the way I phrase and repeat lyrics, maybe. But I was a hip hop fan before I got into rave which is what I listen to now. I like both musics for their energy and their emotion. I relate to the beats PJ and Smiley use. We work real patterns."

According to critic Martin Pearson, the record owes as much to the singer's jazz vocals as it does to the hardcore production, adding that it "veers between dancefloor destruction and sparkling acappella ambience." According to Eshun, the sharp contrast between the elements in Nicolette's sound were unique for the resultant "distinct lack of dancefloor fusion", with music clattering ahead of the languid vocals. "I like to use a lot of space in my music", Nicolette explained. "It makes people listen and I can tell a story through a mood which leaves you open to hear what you want to hear. I prefer songs which set up an atmosphere rather than songs which tell you about your emotions, like, you've got to be free or peaceful or whatever." Muggs adds that although the singer's tracks were typically tough for the Shut Up and Dance catalogue, her contrasting voice illustrated "how deep the smooth soul-jazz streams in soundsystem culture ran, and how these streams were not antithetical to the rougher, darker sounds around them, but part of the same cultural machine".

The album consists of self-penned torch songs, described by writer Simon Reynolds as "bittersweet" in style. Nicolette's lyrics incorporate a stream-of-consciousness approach, while some of the record's songs engage in political commentary. She rejected autobiographical interpretations of the material, instead considering the album to be what Eshun described as "an exploration of universal situations". Muggs writes that although the album's music had no precedent, Nicolette's "deep jazz undertow", mischief and lyrical philosophy are "absolutely infused" into the British breakbeat rave sound it exemplifies. "Single Minded People" features samples from George Kranz's song "Din Daa Daa", while according to Eshun, the contemporary single "Wicked Mathematics" featured Nicolette's most dramatic "heightened use of space" up to that point, adding: "It seems to breathe between the friction of music and vocals."

== Release and reception ==
Professional ratings
Review scores
Source	Rating
AllMusic	4/5 stars
Encyclopedia of Popular Music	3/5 stars

Now Is Early was released in the United Kingdom on 27 April 1992 by Shut Up and Dance Records, and was commercially unsuccessful. Some critics thought the record was unusually intimate or melodic for the hard-edged label. Shut Up and Dance also released Now Is Early in Germany in conjunction with Rough Trade Records, while PJ and Smiley sent ambient techno producer Carl Craig copies of the album and their own record, Dance Before the Police Come! (1991). According to Muggs, Now Is Early was potentially the first "vocalist album" in rave music, beyond the precedent of Rebel MC and his reliance on guest vocalists for Rebel Music (1990). The release coincided with a Shut Up and Dance showcase where Nicolette performed with an all-female band, working through jazzy acoustic material to rave music.

On release, Now Is Early received some attention in the British music press. In an article for Select, Martin Pearson wrote that although the singer would be suited for dreamy, acoustic guitar-based folk music, her decision to pair with Shut Up and Dance's minimalist, "headbone-kicking beats" resulted in an unusually successful combination, and described the album as possessing a "determinedly different sound." An unspecified writer for the Newcastle Evening Chronicle was more reserved, feeling the jazzy, Porgy and Bess-esque singing and energetic music made for a disappointing combination. Nicolette said upon critics singling out her distinctive style: "No matter how different people think I sound, it wouldn't have occurred to me unless they told me so. To me, everyone sounds unique." In their year-end lists of 1992's best albums, Spex ranked Now Is Early third, while OOR ranked it 11th.

Besides lending her vocals to various collaborations, including on Massive Attack's Protection (1994), Nicolette rarely recorded in the ensuing four years after the release of Now Is Early, only resuming her discography in 1996 after singing to Talkin' Loud. In 1997, Berlin-based !K7 Records released a digitally remastered version of Now Is Early with the bonus tracks "School of the World" and "Udi Egwu", both of which appeared on Nicolette's early single releases. That same year, Nicolette contributed DJ-Kicks: Nicolette to Studio !K7's DJ-Kicks mix album series. According to Muggs, the reissue of Now Is Early was in acknowledgment of the album's status as a "Bohemian gem [...] both timeless and utterly of its time". In a positive retrospective review, John Bush of AllMusic described Now Is Early as charting "an intriguing course between her soulful, house-influenced vocal work and the more hardcore production sound."

== Legacy ==
"[Nicolette] cites the drum 'n' bass movement as one of the most exciting underground musical developments this country has seen in years, a sentiment backed by her first album, the aptly-titled Now Is Early which mashed her angelic voice over hectic beats at a time when the word jungle didn't even exist."

—Jim Byers, The List (1996)

Now Is Early has gone on to be considered an early example of jungle music, released before the genre had been given a name, and some critics have described it as an unjustly overlooked work. Reynolds credits the album for predicting the jazz-tinged directions explored by jungle music in 1995–96, finding this exemplary of Shut Up & Dance's large legacy and citing it among several releases on the label which "anticipated crucial stands of the jungalistic sound system," alongside Rum & Black's "Bogey Man" (1991) and the singles of The Ragga Twins. Eshun described Now Is Early as "a forgotten classic" and included "Waking Up Remix" on the compilation album Routes from the Jungle (1995), which features hardcore techno and jungle music "from the roots to the future".

Vibe wrote that Now Is Early "proved too odd for mainstream appeal" on its release in 1992, but added that "given the eventual success of similarly idiosyncratic vocalists like Björk", the album was perhaps "simply ahead of its time." According to Muggs, Now Is Early joined Carlton's The Call Is Strong (1991) in establishing a blueprint for albums by singer-songwriters that harnessed "the creativity of the rave", resulting in an individual identity in rave's "very British, very grass-roots format." In an article for Fact, he praised both albums for their "individualist urban rave blues". In The Rough Guide to Rock, Al Spicer called Now Is Early Nicolette's "lost treasure of an album" and "a collection of torch songs to tear your heart out," while John Bush of AllMusic reflected that the album showed Nicolette "to be an uncommonly mature talent who wrote her own songs and featured a warm, crystalline voice." Michael Lawson of The Guardian describes Now Is Early as a "majestic, jazz-infused" album that exemplifies PJ and Smiley's continued creation of "innovative music" after their work with the Ragga Twins.

In 1995, OOR ranked the album at number 59 in their list of "The 100 Best Albums of 1991–1995", while in 1999, Spex ranked the album at number 57 in their list of "The 100 Albums of the Century". In 2000, German magazine Zundfunk ranked the album at number 18 in their list of "The Best Albums of the 90s". In 2006, Exclaim! listed the album on their list of "100 Records That Rocked 100 Issues of Exclaim!". The magazine called it exuberant, "quintessentially British" album, highlighting Nicolette's flowing, entrancing voice, and concluding that the album is "[a] must have for drum & bass fans." In 2013, Groove ranked the album at number 40 in their list of "The 100 Best Electronic Albums". In 2006, author Christophe Brault named it the fifteenth best album of 1992. Kirsty Yates of Brighton-based duo Insides listened to Now Is Early during the recording of their album Euphoria (1993).

== Track listing ==
All tracks are written by Nicolette and Shut Up and Dance

No.	Title	Length
1.	"No Government"	2:02
2.	"Dove Song"	4:55
3.	"Single Minded Vocal"	3:09
4.	"I Woke Up"	4:46
5.	"Waking Up Remix"	5:07
6.	"O Si Nene"	5:56
7.	"It's Only to Be Expected"	5:41
8.	"Wicked Mathematics"	4:49
9.	"A Single Ring"	2:09

Bonus tracks (1997 reissue)
No.	Title	Length
10.	"School of the World"	5:28
11.	"Udi Egwu"	6:29

== Personnel ==
Adapted from the liner notes of Now Is Early

- Nicolette – writing
- Shut Up & Dance – writing, production, arranging
- Charlie Fawell – photography
