= Verity Sharp =

British radio presenter

Verity Sharp (born 1970) is an English television and radio presenter.

== Early life ==
Sharp grew up in Somerset. After studying at Dartington College of Arts, she read music at the University of York and studied composition. During these years, she did some acting, performed music, and studied languages, including French.

== Presenting career ==
Sharp moved to London after graduating in 1992, and began working for Radio 3 in 1993, the year she had planned to start a post-graduate degree at the Guildhall School of Music. She trained as a producer, and from 1997 regularly produced and presented Pebble Mill's Music Machine, a 15-minute music programme primarily intended for children. A year later, she was hosting the contemporary music show Hear And Now.

In 2001, the eclectic late-night music programme Late Junction, which she presented at that time in alternation with Fiona Talkington and Max Reinhardt, won her the Silver Sony Radio Academy Award for Music Broadcaster of the Year – a "very proud moment for the team after three years of very hard work". On 21 March 2013, at the end of that evening's edition of programme, she formally announced that she was to cease being one of its regular presenters in order to pursue "a few more musical dreams". She has since become a regular presenter again. Since autumn 2019 when it moved to a single weekly show, she has alternated presentation duties with Jennifer Lucy Allan.

She was also one of the presenters of The Culture Show on BBC2, and also presents Slow Radio on BBC Sounds.

== Music interest ==
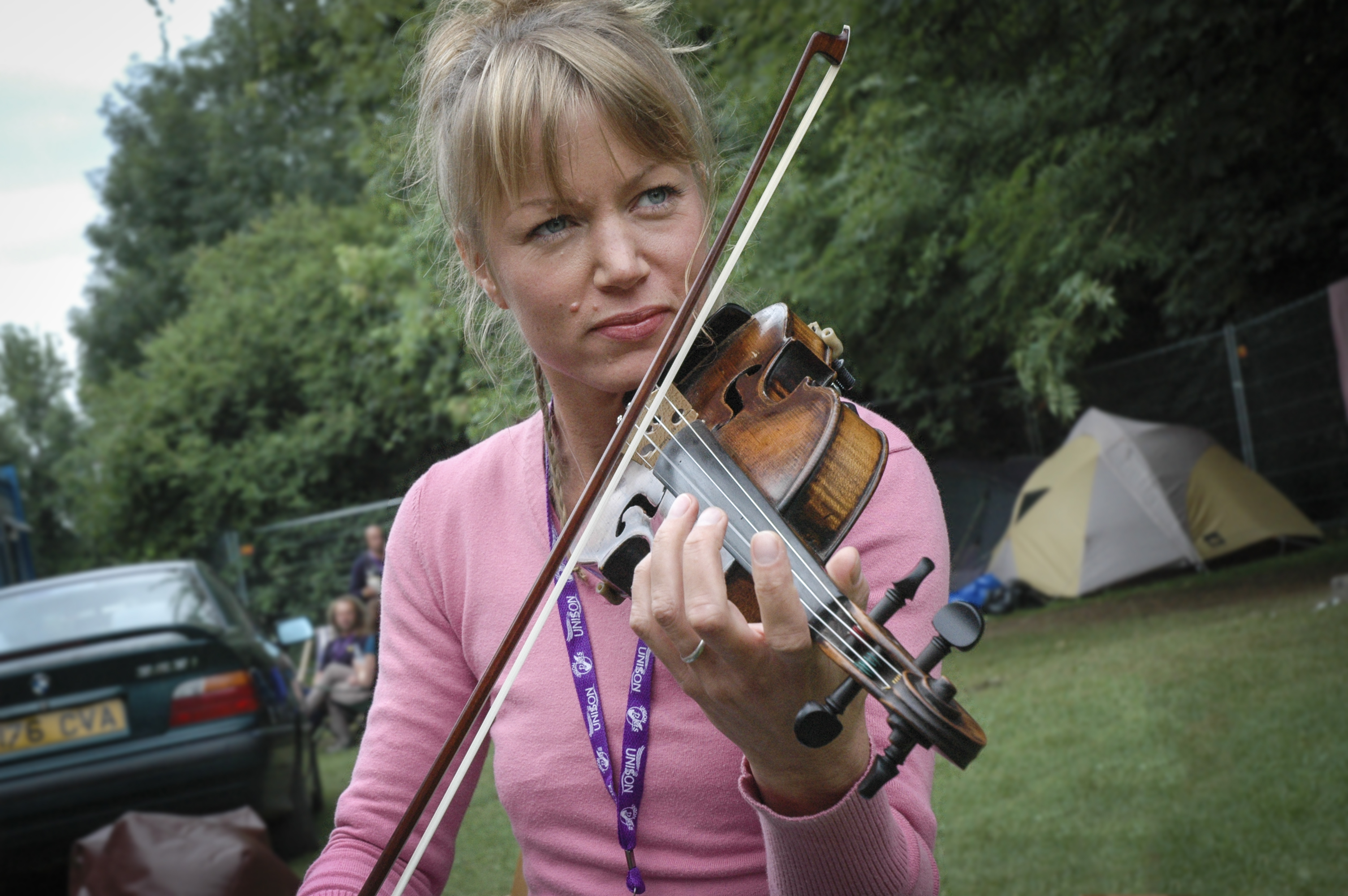
Sharp at the 2005 Cambridge Folk Festival

It was from her student years that she acquired a taste for non-Western music. Although her training was in classical cello she later took up the fiddle and turned to traditional music. In 2013, she narrated the BBC Four documentary How to Be a World Music Star: Buena Vista, Bhundu Boys and Beyond.
