= Mission: Impossible (soundtrack) =

Mission: Impossible: Music from and Inspired by the Motion Picture

Soundtrack album by Various artists and Danny Elfman
- Released: May 14, 1996
- Recorded: 1995 – 1996
- Genre: Soundtrack
- Length: 64:40
- Label: Island Records
- Producers: Various artists and Danny Elfman

Singles from Mission: Impossible: Music from and Inspired by the Motion Picture
- 1. "Theme from Mission: Impossible" Released: June 3, 1996

Professional ratings
Review scores
Source	Rating
AllMusic	3/5 stars
Smash Hits	3/5 stars

Mission: Impossible: Music from and Inspired by the Motion Picture is the official soundtrack for the 1996 film Mission: Impossible. The soundtrack was a success, peaking at No. 16 on the Billboard 200 and spawning the top-10 hit "Theme from Mission: Impossible" by U2 members Adam Clayton and Larry Mullen Jr.

"Theme from Mission: Impossible" was certified gold by the Recording Industry Association of America for sales of 500,000 copies on July 2, 1996, while the soundtrack reached gold status just two weeks later on July 16.

== Track listing ==
No.	Title	Writer(s)	Producer(s)	Length
1.	"Theme from Mission: Impossible" (Larry Mullen and Adam Clayton)	Lalo Schifrin	Larry Mullen; David Beal (co.)	3:27
2.	"Spying Glass" (Massive Attack)	Andrew Vowles; Robert Del Naja; Grantley Marshall; Nellee Hooper; Horace Hinds	Nellee Hooper; Massive Attack	5:20
3.	"I Spy" (Pulp)	Nick Banks; Jarvis Cocker; Candida Doyle; Steve Mackey; Russell Senior; Mark Webber	Chris Thomas	5:56
4.	"Impossible Mission" (Danny Elfman)	Danny Elfman	Danny Elfman	5:35
5.	"Headphones" (Björk)	Björk Guðmundsdóttir; Tricky	Björk; Tricky	5:40
6.	"Weak" (Skunk Anansie)	Skin; Ace; Cass; Robbie France	Sylvia Massy; Skunk Anansie	3:31
7.	"On and On" (Longpigs)	Crispin Hunt	Kevin Bacon; Jonathan Quarmby; Gil Norton (add.)	4:11
8.	"Claire" (Danny Elfman)	Elfman	Elfman	2:55
9.	"Dreams" (The Cranberries)	Dolores O'Riordan; Noel Hogan	Stephen Street	4:13
10.	"You, Me and World War III ('Big' Single Remix)" (Gavin Friday)	Gavin Friday; Maurice Seezer	Tim Simenon; Gavin Friday (co.); Maurice Seezer (co.)	4:28
11.	"So" (Salt)	Salt	Dag Lundquist; Salt	3:33
12.	"Trouble" (Danny Elfman)	Elfman	Elfman	3:32
13.	"No Government" (Nicolette)	Nicolette	Plaid	5:31
14.	"Alright" (Cast)	John Power	John Leckie	3:35
15.	"Mission: Impossible Theme (Mission Accomplished)" (Adam Clayton and Larry Mullen)	Schifrin	Howie B	3:05

Notes and sample credits

- Only tracks 1, 4, 8, 9, and 12 are actually heard in the movie.
- "Theme from Mission: Impossible" contains a sample from the original television soundtrack recording of "Mission: Impossible Theme", conduced and performed by Lalo Schifrin.
- "Impossible Mission" contains an excerpt from "The Plot", written by Lalo Schifrin.
- "Trouble" contains an excerpt from "Mission: Impossible Theme", written by Lalo Schifrin.

== Charts ==
=== Weekly charts ===
Chart (1996)	Peak position
Australian Albums (ARIA)	21
Austrian Albums (Ö3 Austria)	6
Dutch Albums (Album Top 100)	65
German Albums (Offizielle Top 100)	12
Hungarian Albums (MAHASZ)	14
New Zealand Albums (RMNZ)	42
Swiss Albums (Schweizer Hitparade)	16
US Billboard 200	16

=== Year-end charts ===
Chart (1996)	Position
US Billboard 200	192

== Certifications ==
Region	Certification	Certified units/sales
Germany (BVMI)	Gold	250,000^{^}
United States (RIAA)	Gold	500,000^{^}
^{^} Shipments figures based on certification alone.
