= Parts in the Post =

Compilation album of remixes by Plaid
- Released: March 18, 2003
- Genre: IDM, electronic, techno, pop, alternative
- Length: 112:58
- Label: Warp Records
- Producer: Plaid

Professional ratings
Review scores
Source	Rating
Allmusic	link
The Milk Factory	2.6/5 link
Pitchfork Media	8.2/10 link

Parts in the Post is a compilation of remix work done by Plaid. It also contains new and rare tracks by Plaid.

== Disc one ==
1. Björk – "All Is Full of Love" 4:18
2. Tao – "Riot in Lagos" 5:08
3. Ebz – "Malawi Gold" 6:02
4. Sieg Uber Die Sonne – "You'll Never Come Back" 5:41
5. Reflection – "Spiral Bits" 4:08
6. Koolaking – "One Latin" 4:53
7. Gregory Fleckner – "Juicy Jazz Girls" 7:42
8. Studio Pressure – "Relics" 7:10
9. Grandmaster Flash & the Furious Five – "Scorpio" 4:57
10. Nicolette – "No Government" 6:34

== Disc two ==
1. Plaid – "Wrong Ways" 5:48
2. Unkle – "Coffeehouse Conversation" 5:22
3. Nicolette – "Wholesome" 4:40
4. Goldfrapp – "Utopia" 4:42
5. Funki Porcini – "King Ashabanapal" 7:00
6. Dropshadow – "Disease Fototienda" 6:32
7. Sensorama – "Zone 30" 6:58
8. Herbert – "Foreign Bodies" 5:14
9. Jung Collective – "Street Preacher" 5:11
10. Coba – "After Dinner" 4:58
