= DJ-Kicks: Nicolette =

Compilation album by Nicolette
- Released: 10 March 1997
- Genre: Electronic
- Length: 122:23
- Label: Studio !K7
- Producer: Nicolette, Plaid

Nicolette chronology
Let No-One Live Rent Free in Your Head (1996)	DJ-Kicks: Nicolette (1997)	Life Loves Us (2005)

DJ-Kicks chronology
Stacey Pullen (1996)	Nicolette (1997)	Rockers Hi-Fi (1997)

DJ-Kicks: Nicolette is a DJ mix album, mixed by Nicolette. It was released on 10 March 1997 on the Studio !K7 independent record label as part of the DJ-Kicks series.

- CD Cat number: !K7054CD
- Vinyl Cat number: !K7054LP

== Disc one ==
1. "It's Yours" - Doc Scott – 5:00
2. "Never Not" (The Black Dog remix) - Nav Katze – 5:56
3. "Nightbreed" - C. J. Bolland – 5:00
4. "Java Bass" - Shut Up and Dance – 3:17
5. "Suicide" - Alec Empire – 4:08
6. "Migrant" - Palace of Pleasure – 6:46
7. "Phyzical" - Roni Size – 6:09
8. "Ventolin" (Salbutamol Mix) - Aphex Twin – 6:08
9. "Pound Your Ironing Board" - The Mike Flowers Pops & Slang – 3:09
10. "I Woke Up" - Nicolette – 5:46
11. "Lash the 90's" - Alec Empire – 4:34
12. "Original Nuttah" - Shy FX & UK Apache – 2:17
13. "Severe Tramua" - Critical Mass – 2:10

== Disc two ==
1. "Burning" - DJ Krust – 7:46
2. "Pillow" - Ohm Square – 4:44
3. "70 + DF" - Horn – 6:37
4. "Basslines Playin' Loud" - Tag – 2:29
5. "A Single Ring" - Nicolette – 2:23
6. "Sweat" - Shizuo – 4:06
7. "Bastards" - Shut Up and Dance – 5:36
8. "Too Busy to Live" (Pressure Mix) - Oge – 3:51
9. "You, Them and Maybe Us" (Challenge Sonica Mix) - Grammatix – 4:41
10. "Angry Dolphin" - Plaid – 6:04
11. "Walhalla's Gate" - Aquastep – 5:24
12. "Bless to Kill" - Mark N-R-G – 3:46
13. "All Day (DJ Kicks)" - Nicolette – 4:36
