= Not for Threes =

Studio album by Plaid
- Released: 27 October 1997
- Genre: IDM; ambient; drum and bass; trip hop
- Length: 68:48
- Label: Warp
- Producer: Plaid

Plaid chronology
Mbuki Mvuki (1991)	Not for Threes (1997)	Rest Proof Clockwork (1999)

Not for Threes is the second studio album by English electronic music duo Plaid. It was released on 27 October 1997 by Warp. The album was released in the United States on 28 April 1998 by Nothing Records.

== Critical reception ==
Professional ratings
Review scores
Source	Rating
AllMusic	4.5/5 stars
Muzik	7/10
NME	7/10
Pitchfork	7.5/10
Spin	8/10

In 2017, Pitchfork ranked Not for Threes at number 36 on its list of the 50 best IDM albums of all time.

== Track listing ==
All tracks are written by Plaid (Ed Handley and Andy Turner), except where noted

No.	Title	Writer(s)	Length
1.	"Abla Eedio"		7:56
2.	"Kortisin"		5:23
3.	"Headspin"		5:34
4.	"Myopia"		4:32
5.	"Lat"		0:46
6.	"Extork"	Plaid; Nicolette	4:11
7.	"Prague Radio"		4:46
8.	"Fer"		4:35
9.	"Ladyburst"		4:19
10.	"Rakimou"	Plaid; Mara; Benet	6:02
11.	"Ol" (omitted from US edition)		4:55
12.	"Seph"		1:36
13.	"Lilith"	Plaid; Björk	4:38
14.	"Forever"		1:16
15.	"Getting"	Plaid; Leila Arab	2:55
16.	"Milh"		5:24
Total length:			68:48

US edition bonus tracks
No.	Title	Length
16.	"Undoneson"	4:16
17.	"Spudink"	4:43
Total length:		72:52

== Personnel ==
Credits are adapted from the album's liner notes.

Plaid

- Ed Handley – production
- Andy Turner – production, vocals (on "Ladyburst")

Additional musicians

- Benet – guitar (on "Kortisin", "Rakimou" and "Lilith"), violin (on "Rakimou" and "Lilith")
- Björk – vocals (on "Lilith")
- Coba – accordion (on "Rakimou" and "Lilith")
- Mara – vocals (on "Myopia", "Ladyburst" and "Rakimou")
- Nicolette – vocals (on "Extork")

Design

- Robert Clifford – photography
- Think 1 – design

== Charts ==
Chart (1997)	Peak position
UK Independent Albums (OCC)	40
