= Orly Chap =

French singer, songwriter and composer

- Occupations: Musician, singer-songwriter
- Known for: Poetic lyrics and raspy voice; "New Chanson" genre
- Notable work: Albums "Bouille de lune" and "Ma lueur clown"
- Website: https://www.facebook.com/orlychapmusic

Orly Chap (born Aurélie Chapin) is a French singer, songwriter and composer known for having a raspy and expressive voice. Her lyrical approach has been likened to disjointed poetry, while her musical style has been described as a sophisticated mixture of "New Chanson", blues, and acoustic rock.

== Biography ==
Now living in Paris, Chap was born in rural Brittany, where she performed in street theater as a youth. She has attributed her abrupt style of writing to her family members, farmers who spoke very little at home. Music and writing therefore became a way for Chap to express herself while growing up. She later left Brittany and, in 1997, she began studying music at the Manufacture Chanson, a school located in Paris.

Her career as a musician was launched in 2001, with a performance at the Printemps de Bourges music festival in France. At that concert, Paris news magazine L'Express, described Chap as being a small shy woman who exploded on stage. In 2002, she won the award for best singer-songwriter at the "Festival international de la chanson de Granby" in Quebec, Canada, beating out local contenders.

According to TV5 Monde, Chap's emotional style of blues grabs at the listener's throat. Comparing her deep voice to Edith Piaf, Le Devoir describes her poetic lyrics as rich and biting. Her first album, "Bouille de lune" (Moon Face), came out in 2005 on the Polydor label. Chap wrote the lyrics for all twelve songs, which were produced by Julien Ribot. Called "Ma lueur clown" (My Glow Clown), her second Polydor album came out three years later and included a duet with Belgian singer Arno, as well as a cover of Prince's song "Controversy". In 2008, she also wrote the lyrics of "Je me souviens de tout" (I Remember Everything), a song specially created for iconic French singer and actress Juliette Gréco. Chap's third album, with the English title "Valley of Joy", was released in 2013 and was self-produced. It had a lighter and more serene tone, then her earlier compilations, and featured mostly indie pop melodies.

Chap has given numerous concerts over the years, many in France. In 2005, during a performance in Paris, she threw herself backwards onto the drummer in a demonstrative gesture. The following year, Chap played at the "Festival du Schmoul" in Bain-de-Bretagne, Brittany. She was one of the performers at the 2009 music festival held in Rambouillet, France, which also featured Marianne Faithfull. In 2010, Chap gave a concert at Paris's Manufacture Chanson, where she had earlier studied music. She has also been the opening act for various musicians like Brigitte Fontaine, Têtes raides, and Arthur H.

== Discography ==
- Album "Bouille de lune" - 2005
- Album "Ma lueur clown" - 2008
- Song lyrics "Je me souviens de tout" - 2008 (Juliette Gréco album of the same name)
- Album "Valley of Joy" - 2013
