= Jennifer Allan (disambiguation) =

Jennifer Allan may refer to:

- Jennifer Lucy Allan, British musicologist
- Jennifer Allan, 1996 Playboy Playmate

== See also ==
- Jennifer Allen, American author and commentator
