= Polymer (disambiguation) =

A polymer is a large molecule composed of many repeating subunits.

Polymer or Polymers may also refer to:

- Polymer, a 2012 album by American rapper Tonedeff
- Polymer (album), a 2019 album by British electronic duo Plaid
- Polymer (journal), an academic journal published by Elsevier
- Polymers (journal), an academic journal published by MDPI
- Polymer (library), a JavaScript library for building web applications

== See also ==
- Polimer TV, a Tamil-language satellite television channel based in Chennai, India
