= Mara Carlyle =

English singer-songwriter, producer, and arranger

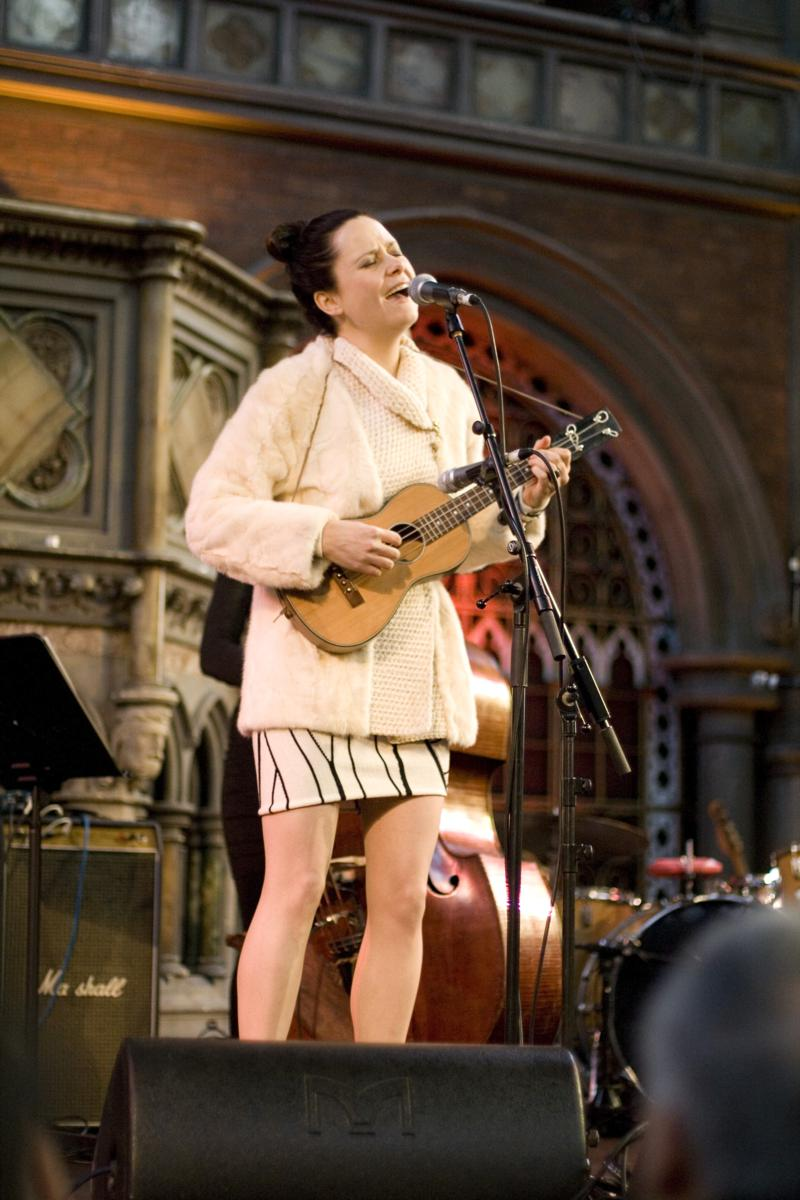
- English singer-songwriter Mara Carlyle at the Union Chapel in London, February 2012

Background information
- Born: 1974 or 1975 (age 51–52)
- Origin: Shropshire, England
- Genres: Singer-songwriter
- Instruments: Vocals, musical saw, ukulele
- Years active: 1997–present
- Labels: Ancient & Modern, Accidental
- Website: maracarlyle.com

Mara Carlyle (born 1974 or 1975) is an English singer-songwriter, producer, and arranger who also plays the musical saw and the ukulele. She was raised in Shropshire, England and now lives in London.

== Career ==
Carlyle's first recorded appearance was on the Plaid album Not For Threes (Warp Records, 1997). She subsequently sang on Plaid's next two albums, Rest Proof Clockwork (1999) and Double Figure (2001). Having sung on Matthew Herbert's big band album Goodbye Swingtime (2003), Carlyle signed to Herbert's label, Accidental Records. Her debut album The Lovely was released in July 2004. It consisted mostly of original compositions, as well as a few reworkings of pieces of classical music, recorded at Carlyle's home. "I Blame You Not" is an English-language version of Schumann's "'Ich grolle nicht". Another track, "Pianni", was featured in the IKEA "Happy Inside" television commercial in which 100 cats are let loose in the retailer's Wembley store. Carlyle's husband was Plaid's Andy Turner, who helped to produce the album.

In May 2005, Carlyle released an EP, I Blame Dido, containing "I Blame You Not" and a version of Henry Purcell's "Dido's Lament".

After receiving critical acclaim for The Lovely, Carlyle signed to EMI in 2007. She recorded her second album in London with producer Dan Carey (who has worked with The Kills and with Kylie Minogue). The album was scheduled for release in June 2008, but was shelved during the restructuring that affected EMI after the label was bought by private equity firm, Terra Firma. Carlyle described this as a period of limbo, in which the album "continues to languish pointlessly, like a pirated ship off the coast of Somalia".

December 2008 saw the release of Classist, a collaboration with composer Max de Wardener under the name "Max de Mara". Carlyle contributed four tracks adapted from Handel, Purcell, Walford Davies and Jacques Offenbach. The album was a limited edition of 333 copies available through Stanley Donwood's Six Inch Records.

After protracted legal negotiations with EMI, Carlyle regained the rights to the album, originally called Nuzzle, and changed the title to Floreat, meaning "Let it flourish". Floreat was released in August 2011 to critical acclaim. The Independent on Sunday declared it "a classic". The album is an eclectic collection across 10 tracks, ranging from the delicate orchestration of "Bowlface en Provence", through the near hip-hop style of "Away with those self loving lads" culminating in the piano led jazz ballard "The Devil and me". The album was written and arranged by Carlyle, with lyrics that, at times, deliberately sit at odds to their polite framing, such as on "Pearl". Hot Chip producer Dan Carey provided an overall pop flourish.

In 2013, she provided vocals, and appeared in the video for the song "She Burns" by the co-founder of Hot Chip, Joe Goddard.

In 2014 she joined the presenting team of the BBC Radio 3 programme Late Junction. Also in late 2014, Carlyle supported Goldfrapp at their concert of 18 November at the Royal Albert Hall, London, England.

In May 2015, Carlyle played her first headline concert for over two years at Rich Mix, Shoreditch, London, and delivered a two-hour setlist of 17 songs, including numbers from "The Lovely" and "Floreat", and covers of "He Makes My Day", originally by Robert Palmer, "It Don't Bother Me" by Bert Jansch and "Ex Factor", originally by Lauryn Hill. She also showcased a new song, tentatively titled 'Murderous Me' from her upcoming, as yet untitled, 3rd album. The band consisted of Mara Carlyle on vocals, ukulele and musical saw, Tom Herbert on double bass, Dan Teper on accordion, Liam Byrne on viola da gamba and James McVinnie on piano. Support artist was cellist Laura Moody.

In December 2015, Carlyle teamed up with KT Tunstall and Max de Wardener, to provide a live soundtrack to Frank Borzage's 1927 romantic silent classic 7th Heaven at the BFI London Southbank.

In 2016, Carlyle collaborated with Gaspard Augé and Xavier de Rosnay, from French Electro House outfit Justice, on their 3rd Album "Woman". Seen as a tribute to femininity, the 10 track album is a romantic, amatory, disco opus on which Carlyle assumed the role of 'Vibe Editor' and produced the choral and orchestral sessions with the London Contemporary Orchestra. She contributed vocals on several tracks, along with musical saw on the album standout track "Chorus", described as a Morricone/Queen mash-up. In 2018, during the Woman Worldwide tour, the duo released a remix version of the album, recording the tracks in a similar way that they are performed during their live stage show. Entitled 'Woman Worldwide' the album went on to win the Grammy Award for Best Dance/Electronic album in 2019

In April 2017, she made a documentary programme to examine the life and vocal magnificence of her beloved Ella Fitzgerald for BBC Radio 4 to mark the centenary of her birth, entitled "Ella Fitzgerald: A Glorious Noise".

As well as singing, and playing the ukulele, Carlyle is an exponent of the musical saw which is a common instrument in Russian folk music and American vaudeville. The instrument features on both of her albums to date, most notably in "Saw Song" from Floreat.

== Discography ==
- The Lovely (Accidental, 2004)
- Floreat (Ancient & Modern, 2011)
