= Oily Cart Theatre Company =

Theatre company in London

Oily Cart
- Formation: 1981; 45 years ago
- Type: Theatre group
- Location: London, England
- Artistic director: Ellie Griffiths
- Website: www.oilycart.org.uk

Oily Cart is a London-based national and international touring theatre company founded in 1981. The company specialises in creating original, immersive, multi-sensory productions for babies and very young children under 5, and for children and young people who have profound and multiple learning disabilities, are on the autism spectrum, or are deafblind/multi-sensory impaired. The emergence of Theatre for Early Years (TEY) has been credited to Oily Cart and Theatre Kit. The company is a registered charity.

== Background ==
Friends Tim Webb MBE, Claire de Loon and Max Reinhardt founded the company in 1981. The first production was Exploding Punch & Judy. Oily Cart has produced and toured over 80 original productions to theatres, arts venues, schools, hospitals and hospices. Performances often take place in unusual settings, such as hydrotherapy pools, trampolines or up in the air. The company's name is a play on the name of the D'Oyly Carte Opera Company.

== Productions ==
- Splish Splash (2018/2019), a co-production with National Theatre Wales performed in hydrotherapy pools for audiences with complex needs
- Light Show (2015/2016/2018), a show for audiences with complex needs which toured schools and arts venues across the UK and as part of Lincoln Center's inaugural Big Umbrella Festival, “the world’s first month-long festival dedicated to programs for children on the autism spectrum and their families”
- Kubla Khan (2017/2018), a multi-sensory adaptation of Samuel Taylor Coleridge's epic poem created in collaboration with charity Sense, and the company's first production with a version for young people who are deafblind/multi-sensory impaired
- In A Pickle (2012, 2015–17), an adaptation of William Shakespeare's The Winter’s Tale for 3 – 5 year olds commissioned by the RSC, which toured the UK and USA
- Baking Time (2003), an early years show in which audiences were given fresh bread baked live on stage
- The Bounce (2014/2015), developed with support from Ockham's Razor, which was performed on trampolines for audiences with complex needs
- Something In The Air (2010/2012), also created in collaboration with Ockham's Razor, which seated audiences with complex needs “in specially created ‘nest’ chairs raised into the air to fly in safety and comfort with the Ockham's Razor aerialists.”

== Company management ==
Head of Design Claire de Loon left Oily Cart at the end of 2016. In January 2018, it was announced that Artistic Director Tim Webb and Musical Director Max Reinhardt would gradually step down over the next two years. In November 2018, the company appointed Ellie Griffiths as its new artistic director, and Zoë Lally as its first-ever Executive Director.
