= Trainer (album) =

Compilation album by Plaid
- Released: 10 July 2000
- Genre: IDM, electronic, techno
- Length: 145:14
- Label: Warp Records
- Producer: Plaid

Professional ratings
Review scores
Source	Rating
AllMusic	5/5 stars
Alternative Press	4/5
Muzik	4/5
NME	8/10
Pitchfork	8.5/10

Trainer is a two-disc compilation released in 2000 by Plaid. It includes the group's rare 1991 debut Mbuki Mvuki, as well as other hard-to-find or unreleased material. Some of the tracks were recorded under Plaid's aliases Atypic, Balil and Tura.

== Track listing ==
=== Disc one ===
1. "Uneasy Listening" – 5:37
2. "Anything" – 5:01
3. "Slice of Cheese" – 6:00
4. "Link" – 6:04
5. "Perplex" – 4:05
6. "Summit" – 4:38
7. "Bouncing Checks" – 5:29
8. "Yak" – 5:51
9. "Scoobs in Columbia" – 5:34
10. "Chirpy" – 4:47
11. "Prig" (as 'Atypic') – 4:52
12. "Eshush" (as 'Balil') – 4:42
13. "Blah" (as 'Atypic') – 4:47
14. "Norte Route" (as 'Balil') – 4:31

=== Disc two ===
1. "Fly Wings" – 4:06
2. "Whirling of Spirits" (as 'Balil') – 5:55
3. "Choke and Fly" (as 'Balil') – 5:51
4. "Small Energies" (as 'Balil') – 6:09
5. "Jolly" (as 'Atypic') – 6:07
6. "Letter" (as 'Tura') – 5:20
7. "Soft Key" (as 'Tura') – 5:18
8. "Reishi" (as 'Tura') – 9:01
9. "Uland" (as 'Balil') – 4:09
10. "Tan Sau" – 6:07
11. "Android" – 7:00
12. "Angry Dolphin" – 8:13
