= Max de Wardener =

British composer

Max de Wardener is a British composer, producer and multi-instrumentalist known for his scores for film and television and his work in jazz, classical, world and electronic music.

== Career ==
Since graduating from York University and the Guildhall School of Music and Drama, he has written music for film and television, including Pawel Pawlikowski's feature films Last Resort (2000) and The Woman in the Fifth (2011), and Jerry Rothwell's 2008 documentary Heavy Load.

As a bass player, he has appeared on albums by Dani Siciliano, Matthew Herbert, Róisín Murphy, Simon Bookish and Plaid and is a member of the Zimbabwean Mbira player Chartwell Dutiro's band.

Inspired by Harry Partch, de Wardener has built some unusual percussion instruments for use in his compositions, including a Bass Marimba and a set of "Cloud Chamber Bowls".

His work as a classical composer includes commissions for the Elysian String Quartet, the London Symphony Orchestra and a multimedia piece for the percussionist Joby Burgess.

In 2008, collaborating with the singer/songwriter Mara Carlyle under the name "Max de Mara", he released an EP on Stanley Donwood's Six Inch Records titled Classist.

To date, his solo discography comprises three albums and two EPs on Mathew Herbert's label, Accidental Records. His first EP, Stops, is a combination of electronic music and recordings of a church organ. His discography also includes remixes for Gabriel Prokofiev, John Richards and Efterklang.

In 2021 he composed the score to the feature film The Power with the electronic music composer Gazelle Twin.

== Solo discography ==
Albums

- Where I Am Today (2004)
- Kolmar (2019)
- Music for Detuned Pianos (2020)
- Detuned Reworks (2020)

EPs

- Stops (2002)
- Classist (2018, with Mara Carlyle)
