= Spokes (album) =

Studio album by Plaid
- Released: 20 October 2003
- Genres: IDM, electronic, techno
- Length: 58:43
- Label: Warp
- Producer: Plaid

Plaid chronology
Double Figure (2001)	Spokes (2003)	Greedy Baby (2006)

Professional ratings
Aggregate scores
Source	Rating
Metacritic	72/100
Review scores
Source	Rating
AllMusic	2.5/5 stars
Pitchfork	6.2/10
Playlouder	3/5 stars
Stylus Magazine	C

Spokes is the fifth studio album by British electronic music duo Plaid. It was released on Warp in 2003.

== Critical reception ==
At Metacritic, which assigns a weighted average score out of 100 to reviews from mainstream critics, the album received an average score of 72% based on 10 reviews, indicating "generally favorable reviews".

Mark Richardson of Pitchfork gave the album a 6.2 out of 10, saying: "A consistent mood is carried through most of these ten tracks, and it can be characterized with words familiar to people who listen to a lot of IDM: reflective and mysterious, with an occasional tension verging on paranoia."

== Track listing ==
No.	Title	Length
1.	"Even Spring"	5:24
2.	"Crumax Rins"	6:00
3.	"Upona"	5:07
4.	"Zeal"	6:01
5.	"Cedar City"	5:47
6.	"B Born Droid"	5:31
7.	"Marry"	6:47
8.	"Get What You Gave"	5:16
9.	"Buns"	6:40
10.	"Quick Emix"	6:10

Japanese edition bonus track
No.	Title	Length
11.	"Miamivice"	3:51
