= Scintilli =

Studio album by Plaid
- Released: 29 September 2011
- Genre: IDM
- Length: 48:14
- Label: Warp
- Producer: Plaid

Plaid chronology
Heaven's Door (2008)	Scintilli (2011)	Reachy Prints (2014)

Professional ratings
Aggregate scores
Source	Rating
Metacritic	67/100
Review scores
Source	Rating
AllMusic	3.5/5 stars
BBC Music	favourable
Pitchfork	5.8/10
The Quietus	unfavourable

Scintilli is the sixth studio album by British electronic music duo Plaid, released 29 September 2011 on Warp Records.

== Track listing ==
All tracks are written by Andy Turner and Ed Handley.

No.	Title	Length
1.	"Missing"	3:50
2.	"Eye Robot"	3:08
3.	"Thank"	4:03
4.	"Unbank"	3:55
5.	"Tender Hooks"	4:32
6.	"Craft Nine"	3:17
7.	"Sömnl"	3:12
8.	"Founded"	3:09
9.	"Talk to Us"	3:30
10.	"35 Summers"	3:28
11.	"African Woods"	3:41
12.	"Upgrade"	3:55
13.	"At Last"	4:34
14.	"Outside Orange" (Japanese bonus track)	4:49
Total length:		48:14

== Charts ==
Chart (2015)	Peak position
UK Albums (OCC)	167
