= Greedy Baby =

Studio album by Plaid & Bob Jaroc
- Released: 26 June 2006 (UK); 11 July 2006 (US)
- Genre: IDM, electronic, techno
- Length: 54:24 (CD version)
- Label: Warp Records
- Producer: Plaid

Plaid chronology
Spokes (2003)	Greedy Baby (2006)	Heaven's Door (2008)

Professional ratings
Review scores
Source	Rating
Allmusic	2.5/5 stars
The Guardian	4/5 stars
Pitchfork Media	(5.8/10)
PopMatters	(7/10)
Tiny Mix Tapes	3/5 stars

Greedy Baby is a CD/DVD with music by Plaid and visuals by Bob Jaroc, released on 26 June 2006 on Warp Records. The release was the culmination of years of work, and was shown in full in a series of very successful IMAX shows. Initial copies ordered directly from Warp included a piece of Super 8 film taken by Jaroc for an upcoming project.

== CD track listing ==
1. "War Dialer" – 3:50
2. "I Citizen The Loathsome" – 5:19
3. "The Launching of Big Face" – 4:14
4. "ZN Zero" – 7:18
5. "The Return of Super Barrio" - Instrumental – 6:51
6. "The Return of Super Barrio" - End Credits – 1:28
7. "E.M.R." – 10:22
8. "Super Positions" – 7:02
9. "To" – 5:10

== DVD segments ==
In addition to videos for each of the songs from Greedy Baby, the DVD has four bonus videos from Jaroc, set to tracks from other Plaid albums and used on tour. Included below are brief descriptions of Jaroc's visuals for each track.

1. "War Dialer"
  - Visual representation of the titular device, using a modem generating random number combinations to find real phone numbers for hacking purposes.
2. "I Citizen The Loathsome"
  - Seamlessly sequenced footage of various streets at night. As the music crescendos, the footage moves increasingly faster and blurs together.
3. "The Launching of Big Face"
  - An animated drawing of a face-like creature.
4. "ZN Zero"
  - Various footage taken in Tokyo, Japan, including elevators, a homeless man, a surgery, and a busy street.
5. "The Return of Super Barrio"
  - A cartoon based on real-life political personality Super Barrio. In the cartoon, Super Barrio faces off against the six enemies of the Mexican people in a wrestling ring: Bud Patriot (representing America), El Official Corrupto (official corruption, represented by a corrupt police officer), Mediatron (a robot representing the spin and hypnotic hold of the media), Las Grandes Corporaciones Unidas (united corporations), Pacheco (a junkie), and, finally, El General (a Mexican general). Additional work on this film was done by Andy Ward
6. "E.M.R."
  - Various footage concerning light.
7. "Super Positions"
  - A morphing, flashing circular object.
8. "To"
  - Scenes of birds in migration patterns.

=== Bonus segments ===
1. "Crumax Rins"
  - Time-lapsed footage of the Iraq War from CNN. The track is from Spokes.
2. "Assault on Precinct Zero"
  - Footage from Plaid and Jaroc's tour together. The track is from Double Figure.
3. "Zala"
  - A surreal setup including a building with a rotating sky, various objects falling in the sky, and an odd-looking man slowly approaching the front of the screen. The track is from Double Figure.
4. "New Family"
  - Footage suggesting American patriotism and militarism is intercut with questions from the Oxford Capacity Analysis, a personality test used by the Church of Scientology to recruit members. The track is from Double Figure.
