= The Digging Remedy =

Studio album by Plaid
- Released: 10 June 2016
- Genre: IDM
- Length: 44:48
- Label: Warp; WARP277
- Producer: Plaid

Plaid chronology
| Reachy Prints (2014) | The Digging Remedy (2016) | Polymer (2019) |

The Digging Remedy is the eighth studio album by British electronic music duo Plaid. It was announced on 28 April 2016, with the lead single of the album, "CLOCK", being released on the same date, along with an interactive website for the album co-created with digital artist Cabbibo. It was released 10 June 2016 on Warp Records.

== Track listing ==
All tracks are written by Andy Turner and Ed Handley.

| No. | Title | Length |
|---|---|---|
| 1. | "Do Matter" | 3:40 |
| 2. | "Dilatone" | 3:40 |
| 3. | "CLOCK" | 4:24 |
| 4. | "The Bee" | 2:50 |
| 5. | "Melifer" | 4:05 |
| 6. | "Baby Step Giant Step" | 4:14 |
| 7. | "Yu Mountain" | 4:04 |
| 8. | "Lambswood" | 4:10 |
| 9. | "Saladore" | 3:51 |
| 10. | "Reeling Spiders" | 3:23 |
| 11. | "Held" | 3:46 |
| 12. | "Wen" | 2:41 |
| Total length: | | 44:48 |

== Personnel ==
- Andy Turner
- Ed Handley
- Benet Walsh – flute, guitar

== Charts ==
| Chart (2016) | Peak position |
|---|---|
| Belgian Albums (Ultratop Flanders) | 110 |
| UK Albums (OCC) | 165 |
| US Top Dance Albums (Billboard) | 14 |
