= Nouvelle Chanson =

Music genre

Nouvelle Chanson (French pronunciation: [nuvɛl ʃɑ̃sɔ̃], meaning "New Song"), derived from the French expression nouvelle scène française, sometimes anglicized as New Chanson, is a musical genre of Chanson which emerged in France in the 1990s and developed in the 2000s. This genre takes inspiration from such forefathers of French Chanson the 1950s-1970s as Jacques Brel, Georges Brassens or Barbara, albeit in a more soft-pop music style. However, the principal influences appear to be rockier artists such as Serge Gainsbourg or Brigitte Fontaine. Principal 21st century French exponents of Nouvelle Chanson include artists such as Benjamin Biolay, Françoiz Breut, Dominique A, Jérôme Minière, Yann Tiersen, Camille, Coralie Clément, Keren Ann, Olivia Ruiz and Émilie Simon. As a developing genre, there is considerable disagreement even in France about who belongs in this genre and how it is to be described.

Well-known contemporary English speaking artists who might also be termed New Chanson in that their musical style is clearly traceable to this same Chanson lineage include artists such as New York-based Rufus Wainwright, his sister Martha Wainwright (who has recorded Barbara's song 'Dis, quand reviendras-tu ?'), Regina Spektor (showing French influence in songs such as 'Après moi' and 'Ne me quitte pas'), CocoRosie (originally American, now Paris-based) and London-based singer-songwriter Ana Silvera.

== Characteristics ==
Nouvelle Chanson, whilst influenced by the forefathers of French Chanson (cited above) has developed through modern influences such as rock and electronica. There is a tendency for theatricality and the adoption of personas, alongside intensely poetic lyrics incorporating surreal and metaphorical elements. Wry, intelligent humour is also often prevalent. However the defining characteristic of Chanson, both old and new, is that it focuses on the French language as vehicle and instrument. There is an emphasis on craftsmanship with many of the artists classically trained and/or having studied music academically (cf. Benjamin Biolay studied at the National Conservatoire, Lyon, Emilie Simon studied musicology at the University of Montpellier, and Ana Silvera has performed with the English National Opera and at the Royal Opera House) giving an intellectual aspect that sets this style of music apart from other genres such as pop, rock and 'anti-folk'.

== Subgenres ==
Nouvelle Chanson artists can be divided into the following genres:

Trip-Hop/Electronica influences
Emilie Simon and Francoiz Breut belong in this group, and Camille, though she uses few electronic effects.

Updated Traditional Chanson
The second group seek to refine traditional Chanson, usually accompanied by a solo guitar or piano. This includes Anais (Croze) and Pauline Croze

Bossa Nova and Samba influenced musicians include
Olivia Ruiz, Coralie Clement, Benjamin Biolay, Emily Loizeau, and Les Blaireux.

Nouvelle Vague
Artists such as Cibelle and Amel Bent are examples of the chanson form with Latin and/or African influences.
Keren Ann, Vanessa Paradis, and Les Blaireaux represent the chanson form mediated through pop/rock sensibilities.

== Literary and artistic influences ==
Nouvelle Chanson takes its inspiration artistically from Dada and Surrealism. Lyrically, inspiration is also drawn from fairy tales, contemporary poetry, and magical realist literature. It is also theatrical, and draws on the adoption of various personas.

== See also ==
- Nueva canción (also known as 'Nueva Trova', 'Nuevo Cancionero' or 'Canto Nuevo')
- Nova Cançó
