= Let No-One Live Rent Free in Your Head =

Studio album by Nicolette
- Released: 1996
- Genre: Big beat; IDM; trip hop; electro-industrial
- Length: 62:04
- Label: Talkin' Loud
- Producer: Nicolette; Plaid; Dego; Alec Empire; Felix

Nicolette chronology
Now Is Early (1992)	Let No-One Live Rent Free in Your Head (1996)	Life Loves Us (2005)

Singles from Let No-One Live Rent Free in Your Head
- 1. "No Government" Released: 1995; 2. "We Never Know" Released: 1996; 3. "Beautiful Day" Released: 1996; 4. "Nightmare" Released: 1996

Let No-One Live Rent Free in Your Head is the second studio album by Scottish musician Nicolette, released in 1996 by Talkin' Loud, peaking at number 36 on the UK Albums Chart. It featured her single "No Government".

== Critical reception ==
Professional ratings
Review scores
Source	Rating
AllMusic	4.5/5 stars
The Guardian	4/5 stars
Muzik	4/5 stars
NME	9/10

John Bush of AllMusic, who gave the album 4.5 stars out of 5, praised the album's production and called it "one of the most glowing moments of mid-'90s vocal electronica". NME named it the 27th best album of 1996.

== Track listing ==
No.	Title	Writer(s)	Producer(s)	Length
1.	"Don't Be Afraid"	Nicolette	Nicolette	1:59
2.	"We Never Know"	Nicolette	Plaid	5:14
3.	"Song for Europe"	Nicolette; Dego	Dego	4:15
4.	"Beautiful Day"	Nicolette	Plaid	5:22
5.	"Always"	Nicolette	Nicolette	5:35
6.	"Nervous"	Nicolette	Alec Empire	3:33
7.	"Where Have All the Flowers Gone?"	Mikhail Sholokhov; Nicolette	Nicolette	4:39
8.	"No Government (As a Way of Life)" (Plaid Remix)	Nicolette	Plaid	6:36
9.	"Nightmare"	Nicolette; Alec Empire	Alec Empire	5:04
10.	"Judgement Day"	Nicolette	Nicolette	3:54
11.	"You Are Heaven Sent"	Nicolette; Felix	Felix	4:08
12.	"Just to Say Peace and Love"	Nicolette	Dego	4:33
13.	"No Government"	Nicolette	Plaid	5:30
14.	"Don't Be Ashamed (Don't Be Afraid Part II)"	Nicolette; Oge	Nicolette	1:52

== Charts ==
Chart (1996)	Peak position
UK Albums (OCC)	36
