= Reachy Prints =

Studio album by Plaid
- Released: 19 May 2014
- Genre: IDM, electronic, techno
- Length: 40:20
- Label: Warp; WARP250
- Producer: Plaid

Plaid chronology
Scintilli (2011)	Reachy Prints (2014)	The Digging Remedy (2016)

Professional ratings
Aggregate scores
Source	Rating
Metacritic	74/100
Review scores
Source	Rating
Allmusic	4/5 stars
Clash	8/10
Exclaim!	6/10
The Guardian	4/5 stars
musicOMH	4/5 stars
Pitchfork Media	6/10
Popmatters	8/10 discs
Resident Advisor	2.5/5
The Skinny	3/5 stars
Sputnikmusic	3.2/5

Reachy Prints is the seventh studio album by British electronic music duo Plaid released 19 May 2014 on Warp Records.

== Release ==
Upon announcement of the album, Plaid released the track "Hawkmoth", and several weeks later revealed the single "Tether". "Tether" was accompanied with an interactive website that acted as a sort of music video that could be mutated by mouse and keyboard input from the user. Plaid continued marketing this track by releasing the stems and initializing a remix contest, the winner of which would receive a package of most of their releases on vinyl records as well as a MIDI instrument that would be used in live performances of the album.

== Track listing ==
No.	Title	Length
1.	"OH"	4:30
2.	"Hawkmoth"	4:49
3.	"Nafovanny"	5:06
4.	"Slam"	5:48
5.	"Wallet"	4:23
6.	"Matin Lunaire"	4:12
7.	"Tether"	4:14
8.	"Ropen"	3:50
9.	"Liverpool St"	3:28
Total length:		40:20

== Charts ==
Chart (2014)	Peak position
Belgian Albums (Ultratop Flanders)	91
Belgian Albums (Ultratop Wallonia)	198
UK Albums (OCC)	95
UK Dance Albums (OCC)	18
UK Independent Albums (OCC)	16
US Dance/Electronic Albums (Billboard)	21
US Top Heatseekers Albums (Billboard)	46
