= Theme from Mission: Impossible =

American television theme music

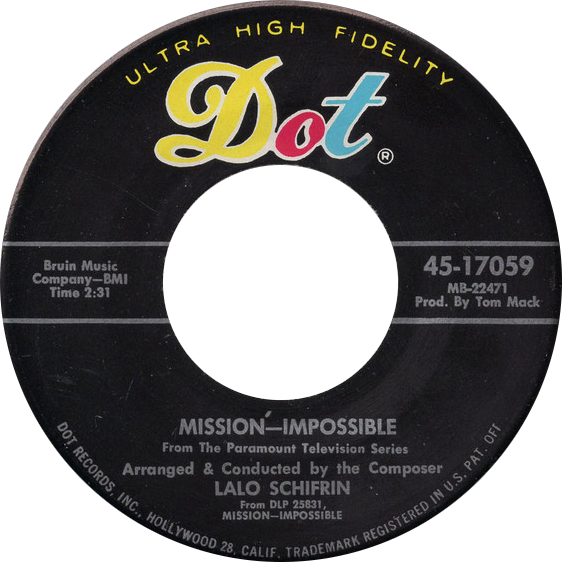
- One of the side-A labels of the US single

Single by Lalo Schifrin

from the album Music from Mission: Impossible
- Released: 1967
- Recorded: 1967
- Genre: Theme music
- Length: 2:31
- Label: Dot
- Songwriter: Lalo Schifrin
- Producer: Tom Mack

Alternative release(s)
- 1987 French 7-inch re-release cover

Official audio
- "Mission: Impossible" on YouTube

"Theme from Mission: Impossible" is the theme tune of the American espionage TV series Mission: Impossible (1966–1973). Written and composed by Argentine composer Lalo Schifrin, the theme later appeared in several other works of the Mission: Impossible franchise, including the 1988 TV series, the film series, and the video game series.

== Overview ==
Theme

The theme is written in quintuple meter (with a 5/4 time signature), which composer Lalo Schifrin jokingly explained as being for mutant people with five legs.

The Morse code for M.I. is two dashes followed by two dots ▄▄▄ ▄▄▄ ▄ ▄ ; if a dot is one beat and a dash is one-and-a-half beats, then this gives a bar of five beats, exactly matching the theme's underlying rhythm. It has been suggested that Schifrin consciously used the Morse code as a starting point for his composition, but this cannot be verified. He did write that he used Morse code as a method for obtaining an unusual rhythmic pattern for his theme to the film The Concorde... Airport '79.

Schifrin's working title for the song was "Burning Fuse". He compared his writing process to writing a letter: "When you write a letter, you don't have to think what grammar or what syntaxes you're going to use, you just write a letter. And that's the way it came." He estimated that he wrote the main theme in 90 seconds and completed the full arrangement in three minutes.

The actor Martin Landau, who played the character Rollin Hand in the show, attended the recording session for the theme song. "Lalo raised his wand to the musicians and I heard 'dun dun, da da, dun dun, da da' for the first time, and it was deafening", Landau recalled. "Lalo interrupted the band and said, 'No, no, it should be like this.' They resumed and before we could say anything, they had recorded it. I was stunned. It was so perfect. I came out humming that tune."

== Reception ==
The original single release, on Dot Records, peaked at number 41 on the US Billboard Hot 100 and 19 on the magazine's Adult Contemporary chart in 1967. Also in that year, two years before Leonard Nimoy began playing the role of Paris in Mission Impossible, the theme appeared on the album Leonard Nimoy Presents Mr. Spock's Music from Outer Space. (Nimoy did not perform on the song.)

== Awards ==
The theme won the Best Instrumental Theme award at the 10th Grammy Awards on February 29, 1968. Schifrin also won the Grammy for Best Original Score Written for a Motion Picture or a Television Show. In 2017, Schifrin's 1967 recording of the "Theme from Mission: Impossible" was inducted into the Grammy Hall of Fame.

Schifrin's version, as performed with the London Philharmonic Orchestra, received a nomination for the Grammy Award for Best Pop Instrumental Performance for the 39th Grammy Awards held in 1997. The Clayton and Mullen version (see below) was also nominated for the same award in the same edition.

== Track listing ==
- 7-inch single
1. "Mission: Impossible" – 2:31
2. "Jim on the Move" – 3:12

== Charts ==
Chart (1967)	Peak position
Canada Top Singles (RPM)	39
US Billboard Hot 100	41
US Easy Listening (Billboard)	7

== Adam Clayton and Larry Mullen Jr. version ==
"Theme from Mission: Impossible"

Single by Adam Clayton and Larry Mullen Jr.

from the album Mission: Impossible: Music from and Inspired by the Motion Picture
- Released: June 3, 1996
- Genre: Theme music; dance-pop; electropop; electronic
- Length: 3:27
- Label: Mother
- Songwriter: Lalo Schifrin
- Producers: David Beal; Larry Mullen

In 1996, the theme was remade by U2 members Adam Clayton and Larry Mullen Jr. for the soundtrack to the film. The duo recorded two versions of the song, the main theme and another subtitled "Mission Accomplished". The main theme was used during the end credits. Unlike the original, the majority of this version is in common time, with the exception of the intro. The single was released on 3 June 1996 by Mother Records. The accompanying music video was directed by English singer, songwriter, musician and music video director Kevin Godley.

=== Critical reception ===
Larry Flick from Billboard magazine wrote that Clayton and Mullen "cover the film's instantly recognizable theme, effectively funking it up for the '90s with a shuffling jeep beat". He complimented Lalo Schifrin's melody as "suspenseful and compelling as ever" and added, "It'll give fans of the TV show a fun jolt while entertaining a whole new generation." Dave Sholin from the Gavin Report commented, "Those not familiar with this piece of music A) are under five years of age, B) have been living with Theodore Kaczynski for the past 25 years, or C) are not aware of television. This interpretation by half of U2 will be heard by millions of moviegoers expected to see what's been anticipated as the film of the summer. Try cranking this up and driving around the hills of San Francisco! Very cool."

Richard Smith from Melody Maker noted that the Mission Impossible theme "has been weirded and danced up with lots of (not desperately imaginative) This tape will self destruct-type samples laid over the top." A reviewer from Music Week gave it a score of four out of five, adding that the song "should be massive". Music Week editor Alan Jones stated, "They have successfully updated it while retaining its more memorable motifs and drafted in mixers including Junior Vasquez, Guru and Goldie to give it a variety of dancefloor flavourings." Jordan Paramor from Smash Hits gave the single three out of five.

=== Chart performance ===
The instrumental became a worldwide hit. In the United States, it peaked at number seven on the Billboard Hot 100 and received a gold certification, selling 500,000 copies there. It additionally peaked at number one in Finland, Hungary and Iceland, number two in Australia and Ireland, and number seven in the United Kingdom.

=== Track listings ===
CD single

MUMTT75 / 576470-2
No.	Title	Length
1.	"Theme from Mission: Impossible"	3:27
2.	"Mission: Impossible Theme (Mission Accomplished)"	3:05
Total length:		6:32

12-inch single

12MUM75 / 576471-1
No.	Title	Length
1.	"Theme from Mission: Impossible"	3:27
2.	"Theme from Mission: Impossible" (Junior's Hard Mix)	8:50
3.	"Mission: Impossible Theme (Mission Accomplished)" (Dave Clarke Remix)	4:30
4.	"Mission: Impossible Theme (Mission Accomplished)"	3:05
5.	"Mission: Impossible Theme (Mission Accomplished)" (Cut The Red Not The Blue)	4:35
6.	"Theme From Mission: Impossible" (Junior's Hard Dub 1)	7:44
Total length:		32:11

MUMCD75 / 576471-2
No.	Title	Length
1.	"Theme from Mission: Impossible"	3:27
2.	"Theme from Mission: Impossible" (Junior's Hard Mix-Edit)	4:10
3.	"Mission: Impossible Theme (Mission Accomplished)"	3:05
4.	"Mission: Impossible Theme (Mission Accomplished)" (Cut the Red Not the Blue)	4:35
5.	"Mission: Impossible Theme (Mission Accomplished)" (Dave Clarke Remix)	4:30
Total length:		19:47

=== Charts ===
==== Weekly charts ====
Chart (1996)	Peak position
Australia (ARIA)	2
Austria (Ö3 Austria Top 40)	4
Belgium (Ultratop 50 Flanders)	15
Belgium (Ultratop 50 Wallonia)	14
Canada Top Singles (RPM)	10
Canada Adult Contemporary (RPM)	15
Canada Dance/Urban (RPM)	8
Denmark (IFPI)	7
Europe (Eurochart Hot 100)	7
Finland (Suomen virallinen lista)	1
France (SNEP)	18
Germany (GfK)	6
Hungary (Mahasz)	1
Iceland (Íslenski Listinn Topp 40)	1
Ireland (IRMA)	2
Israel (Israeli Singles Chart)	11
Netherlands (Dutch Top 40)	15
Netherlands (Single Top 100)	18
New Zealand (Recorded Music NZ)	7
Norway (VG-lista)	4
Scottish Singles Sales (Official Charts)	12
Sweden (Sverigetopplistan)	5
Switzerland (Schweizer Hitparade)	9
Taiwan (IFPI)	1
UK Singles (Official Charts)	7
UK Airplay (Music Week)	13
UK Pop Tip Club Chart (Music Week)	3
US Billboard Hot 100	7
US Adult Pop Airplay (Billboard)	23
US Dance Club Songs (Billboard)	2
US Dance Singles Sales (Billboard)	4
US Pop Airplay (Billboard)	10
US Cash Box Top 100	6

==== Year-end charts ====
Chart (1996)	Position
Australia (ARIA)	21
Austria (Ö3 Austria Top 40)	30
Belgium (Ultratop 50 Flanders)	79
Belgium (Ultratop 50 Wallonia)	69
Canada Top Singles (RPM)	96
Europe (Eurochart Hot 100)	43
France (SNEP)	52
Germany (Media Control)	42
Iceland (Íslenski Listinn Topp 40)	11
Israel (Israeli Singles Chart)	47
Sweden (Topplistan)	21
Switzerland (Schweizer Hitparade)	40
UK Singles (OCC)	64
US Billboard Hot 100	66
US Dance Club Play (Billboard)	38
US Maxi-Singles Sales (Billboard)	37
US Top 40/Mainstream (Billboard)	76

=== Certifications ===
Region	Certification	Certified units/sales
Australia (ARIA)	Gold	35,000^{^}
New Zealand (RMNZ)	Gold	5,000^{*}
United States (RIAA)	Gold	500,000^{^}
^{*} Sales figures based on certification alone.^{^} Shipments figures based on certification alone.

== Other cover versions and renditions ==
Jazz organist Jimmy Smith recorded a cover version for his 1968 album Livin' It Up.

Composer and arranger Alan Copeland in 1968 issued the single, "Mission: Impossible Theme / Norwegian Wood", interpolating "Theme from Mission: Impossible" and the Beatles song "Norwegian Wood". It peaked at number 120 on the Billboard Bubbling Under chart and won a Grammy Award for Best Contemporary Pop Performance by a Chorus. The recording might be termed a proto-mashup. In her 2014 essay, "When Pop Stars Collide: Mashups As Musical Destiny," Assistant Professor of Music Theory Christina Boone of Indiana State University states that this "was probably the earliest example of pop songs being heard at the same time, overlaid on top of one another," while also noting that it cannot literally be termed a mashup since it employed no pre-recorded music but rather Copeland's own newly recorded arrangements of the two compositions.

One cover version was recorded by French No Wave artist Lizzy Mercier Descloux on her 1979 album, Press Color.

A version of the theme was used during the panty raid sequence of the 1984 movie Revenge of the Nerds.

A version of the theme was also used during the electric zap belt donning sequence in the 1992 movie Wayne's World.

An arrangement of the theme was composed by Bruce Broughton for the pound escape sequence in 1993’s Homeward Bound: The Incredible Journey. The song transitions from the theme to original music and was included in the expanded Intrada Records soundtrack release, the track simply being titled “Mission: Impossible”.

Rhythm section and production duo Sly and Robbie recorded a cover version for their 1997 album Mambo Taxi, a reggae and dub reworking of classic film themes.

The theme's melodies form the basis of Limp Bizkit's 2000 single "Take a Look Around", which was recorded for the soundtrack of the second film.

Russian ethnic band Bugotak recorded a Russian-language rap song with ethnic Siberian instruments based on "Take a Look Around", the theme and "Empty Spaces" by Pink Floyd, entitled "Missiya Maadai-kara nevypolnima".

American rapper Kanye West and producer Jon Brion created a remix version at the end credits of the third film.

Brave Combo covered the theme as a "deep groove cumbia" on their 2008 album, The Exotic Rocking Life.

Houston rapper Chamillionaire, remixed the theme song for his cancelled third album Venom in 2010.

In 2010, a fictionalized account of Lalo Schifrin's creation of the Mission: Impossible tune was featured in a Lipton TV commercial aired in a number of countries around the world.

Tiësto created a dance remix version of the theme to promote the fourth film in the series Mission: Impossible – Ghost Protocol (2011).

In January 2013, violinist and dancer Lindsey Stirling and The Piano Guys, Steven Sharp Nelson (cello) and Jon Schmidt (piano), released their interpretation of the "Theme from Mission: Impossible". The arrangement is true to the Schifrin original, but also employs a passage with a liberal use of the Piano Sonata in C by Wolfgang Amadeus Mozart K. 545 first movement and a self-composed passage to end the piece. The arrangement was introduced with a music video having a comedic cloak and dagger theme. Two official copies of the video have garnered nearly 10.7 million views (as of April 2021) on Lindsey Stirling's YouTube channel and over 20 million views on The Piano Guys YouTube channel (as of April 2021).

For the promotion of the fifth film Mission: Impossible – Rogue Nation (2015), Japanese guitarist Miyavi covered the theme.

The theme was used in a series of commercials for Etsy during the 2023 Christmas season.

An arrangement was played during the closing ceremony of the 2024 Summer Olympics during the segment where Tom Cruise retrieves the Olympic Flag from Paris en route to Los Angeles.

The 2024 Indian Tamil film The Greatest of All Time by filmmaker Venkat Prabhu had an Indianized cover version of the theme created by music composer Yuvan Shankar Raja when the main character jumps off a skyscraper in Bangkok after accomplishing a crucial mission. Earlier, a short clip from the same scene was played in the Telugu and Hindi versions of the film's trailer.
