= Shaheera Asante =

British radio presenter

Caroline S. Asante (born December 1979) is a British-born broadcast journalist, editor and environmentalist of Guyanese and Ghanaian descent.

== Early life ==
Asante was born in London to a Guyanese, South American mother who worked as a midwife and Ghanaian, West African father, who she claims met as students at the University of Cambridge.

Asante claims she is a princess of the royal family of Oyemum in Ghana, via her grandmother who was Queen mother of Shama District (formerly known as the Shama Ahanta East Metropolitan District), in the Western Region of Ghana, with ancestral lineage from the Asante Akim North Region. She is both Fante and Ashanti.

Asante says she spent her early and primary school years with her grandparents in both Demerara and Linden, Guyana before returning to the United Kingdom for secondary education in North London. Together with her mother she emigrated to Canada at where she later studied Humanities at the University of Alberta.

== Career ==
Asante began working as a music and entertainment television presenter in Canada working for Citytv, MuchMusic, and Rogers Cable. During the late 1990s, she produced and presented various entertainment and music programmes including her own programme, World Music Express, at the time one of the youngest presenters of what was then the first dedicated world music show of its kind in North America.

Africa's music icons Manu Dibango, Baaba Maal, Oumou Sangare, Angelique Kidjo and Femi Kuti among others appeared as guests on Asante's show, which earned her a Best Ethnic and Cultural Expression TV Series Award, in both 1998 and 1999, from the Cable Television Awards in New York.

Asante returned to the United Kingdom in 2000, and became a presenter for BBC Radio 3's Late Junction from 2001 to 2007, during this time the show won a Sony gold award in 2003 for Music Programming. She then co-created and presented BBC's first online African show Africa on Your Street. dedicated to promoting African content and culture. Asante worked across the BBC networks as freelance presenter, producer and writer. In 2004, she wrote and presented radio documentaries including Somaliland and Goddess in Every Woman for BBC World Service.

In London, Asante curated several high-profile exhibits for "Africa 05" to promote more positive images of Africa and Africans in the media. Asante said she was "fed up of the negative images of Africa in the media. which negated positive and empowering stories and people". In 2007, she created Ghana 50 and Forward Africa as two large-scale contemporary curatorial exhibitions, at the Victoria and Albert Museum, London, the opening of which music producer Quincy Jones attended. She has also lectured on contemporary African art and society at the Hayward Gallery in London and continues to be a creative pioneer for contemporary African culture. In March 2007, Asante co-hosted Resistance and Remembrance, an event at the British Museum to commemorate the 200th anniversary of the Abolition of the Transatlantic Slave Trade.

An apparent decision by BBC Radio 3's Late Junction executive producer Andrew Kurowski to temporarily replace her on one of the Late Junction programmes, to accommodate a more "English folk-roots season of music" according to Asante, was criticised in The Times by music columnist Paul Donovan: "Asante, was incensed to be told by e-mail by the show’s producer Andrew Kurowski, that for her next scheduled programme she would not be presenting, but would be temporarily replaced by Mark Russell, who had not been a presenter of the programme since 2001. She regards the stated reasons as spurious." In response to this comment the BBC stated: “To our knowledge, Shaheera hasn’t made these accusations to us. She is on contract, and no decision has been made to take her off Late Junction, or the Radio 3 network."

Asante continues as a freelance producer for other BBC networks, and insisted that there were no hard feelings between her and BBC Radio 3, and that the station "did not represent the entire BBC broadcasting network". Asante said she had "enjoyed many years at BBC to date" and "continues to have a close affinity with her producers and other staff" and was "committed to great programme making".

== Environmental advocacy ==
Asante founded the first Cambridge Eco-Living Festival, (2017–2019) in the city of Cambridge in which she created a city-wide #GoPlasticFreeDay and the UK's first pop up eco lifestyle centre within a retail shopping centre. Asante is currently as sought after sustainability video content producer, educator and is an environmental activist and mother. She holds a Masters of Science degree in Sustainability from the Global Sustainability Institute (GSI) at Anglia Ruskin University, Cambridge.
