= Polymer (album) =

Studio album by Plaid
- Released: 7 June 2019
- Length: 52:18
- Label: Warp
- Producer: Plaid

Plaid chronology
The Digging Remedy (2016)	Polymer (2019)	Feorm Falorx (2022)

Professional ratings
Review scores
Source	Rating
AllMusic	4/5 stars
Exclaim!	8/10
musicOMH	3.5/5 stars

Polymer is the ninth studio album by British electronic music duo Plaid. It was released on 7 June 2019 by Warp. It is the follow-up to their 2016 album The Digging Remedy. The tracks "Maru", "Recall", "Los", and "Dancers" were made available prior to release, each with a music video.

== Background ==
Plaid said in a press release that the themes of the album are "the problems and benefits of polymers" as well as "the natural versus the synthetic, silk and silicone, the significant effect they have on our lives". Warp stated the album features "energetic bangers, bright melodic visceral rhythms and hypnotic wombic textures".

== Promotion ==
The band set up a microsite that allows users to "explore the component parts" of the track "Maru".

== Track listing ==
All tracks are written by Andy Turner and Ed Handley, except where noted

Polymer track listing
No.	Title	Length
1.	"Meds Fade" (writers: Handley, Turner and Benet Walsh)	3:14
2.	"Los"	4:50
3.	"Maru"	4:49
4.	"Ops"	4:16
5.	"Drowned Sea"	4:48
6.	"The Pale Moth" (writers: Handley, Turner and Benet Walsh)	4:52
7.	"Dancers"	5:00
8.	"Nurula" (writers: Handley, Turner and Benet Walsh)	4:00
9.	"Recall"	3:11
10.	"All to Get Her"	3:13
11.	"Dust"	2:21
12.	"Crown Shy" (writers: Handley, Turner, Benet Walsh, Gabriel Walsh)	3:50
13.	"Praze" (writers: Handley, Turner and Benet Walsh)	3:54
Total length:		52:18

== Personnel ==
Additional musicians

- Benet Walsh – electric guitar (tracks 1, 8, 12); Spanish guitar (tracks 6 and 13); clarinet (tracks 6 and 8); violin (track 6); mandolin (track 13)
- Gabriel Walsh – accordion (track 12)

Technical

- Plaid – production
- John Tejada – mastering

== Charts ==
Chart performance for Polymer
Chart (2019)	Peak position
Scottish Albums (OCC)	100
