= Rest Proof Clockwork =

Studio album by Plaid
- Released: 21 June 1999
- Genre: Trip hop; IDM; ambient; electronica
- Length: 64:29
- Label: Warp; Nothing
- Producer: Plaid

Plaid chronology
| Not for Threes (1997) | Rest Proof Clockwork (1999) | Double Figure (2001) |

Professional ratings
Review scores
| Source | Rating |
|---|---|
| AllMusic | 4/5 stars |
| The Milk Factory | 4/5 |
| Pitchfork | 8.4/10 |

Rest Proof Clockwork is the third studio album by English electronic music duo Plaid, released on 21 June 1999 by Warp.

== Critical reception ==
John Bush of AllMusic gave the album 4 stars out of 5, saying, "Rest Proof Clockwork is yet another production masterpiece to file on the shelf with the rest of Plaid's work." He added: "The element that puts them far, far ahead of every other beatminer out there is a growing sense of spirit that lets the machines do the singing."

== Track listing ==
| No. | Title | Length |
|---|---|---|
| 1. | "Shackbu" | 5:25 |
| 2. | "Ralome" | 4:28 |
| 3. | "Little People" | 4:04 |
| 4. | "3 Recurring" | 0:44 |
| 5. | "Buddy" | 6:33 |
| 6. | "Dead Sea" | 4:18 |
| 7. | "Gel Lab" | 4:14 |
| 8. | "Tearisci" | 0:56 |
| 9. | "Dang Spot" | 3:56 |
| 10. | "Pino Pomo" | 5:07 |
| 11. | "Last Remembered Thing" | 4:19 |
| 12. | "Lambs Eye" | 1:20 |
| 13. | "New Bass Hippo" | 5:41 |
| 14. | "Churn Maiden" | 1:14 |
| 15. | "Air Locked / Face Me" | 12:13 |
