= Double Figure =

Studio album by Plaid
- Released: 28 May 2001
- Genre: IDM, electronic, techno
- Length: 70:00
- Label: Warp
- Producer: Plaid

Plaid chronology
Rest Proof Clockwork (1999)	Double Figure (2001)	Spokes (2003)

Professional ratings
Aggregate scores
Source	Rating
Metacritic	81/100
Review scores
Source	Rating
AllMusic	4/5 stars
NME	8/10
Pitchfork	7.6/10

Double Figure is the fourth studio album by British electronic music duo Plaid. It was released on Warp in 2001. It peaked at number 29 on the UK Independent Albums Chart.

== Critical reception ==
At Metacritic, which assigns a weighted average score out of 100 to reviews from mainstream critics, the album received an average score of 81% based on 11 reviews, indicating "universal acclaim".

John Bush of AllMusic gave the album 4 stars out of 5, saying, "Plaid returned in 2001 with an LP of tough machine music, closer to the melancholy beatbox style of their mid-'90s singles than the rangy, dynamic sound of 1999's Rest Proof Clockwork." Malcolm Seymour III of Pitchfork gave the album a 7.6 out of 10, saying: "This album features some of their best work to date, but also some of their greatest failures."

== Track listing ==
No.	Title	Length
1.	"Eyen"	4:20
2.	"Squance"	5:01
3.	"Assault on Precinct Zero"	4:28
4.	"Zamami"	4:05
5.	"Silversum"	4:14
6.	"Ooh Be Do"	4:27
7.	"Light Rain"	3:49
8.	"Tak 1"	1:02
9.	"New Family"	5:17
10.	"Zala"	4:45
11.	"Twin Home"	5:15
12.	"Tak 2"	1:08
13.	"Sincetta"	5:00
14.	"Tak 3"	0:49
15.	"Porn Coconut Co."	4:52
16.	"Tak 4"	0:59
17.	"Ti Bom"	4:52
18.	"Tak 5"	0:50
19.	"Manyme"	4:48

Japanese edition bonus track
No.	Title	Length
20.	"Fell"	4:24

== Charts ==
Chart	Peak position
UK Independent Albums (OCC)	29
