= Jennifer Lucy Allan =

British writer, researcher and radio presenter

- Other name: Jen
- Education: University of Sheffield; City, University of London
- Occupations: Writer; Researcher; Radio presenter
- Website: jenniferlucyallan.co.uk

Jennifer Lucy Allan, known informally as Jen, is a British writer, researcher and radio presenter.

Allan has written for The Guardian The Quietus, and The Wire, being online editor for the latter. She was a presenter on Resonance FM, and in autumn 2019 became a co-host of BBC Radio 3 programme Late Junction, alternating with Verity Sharp. This followed previous guest slots presenting special editions of the show, starting from 24 July 2018.

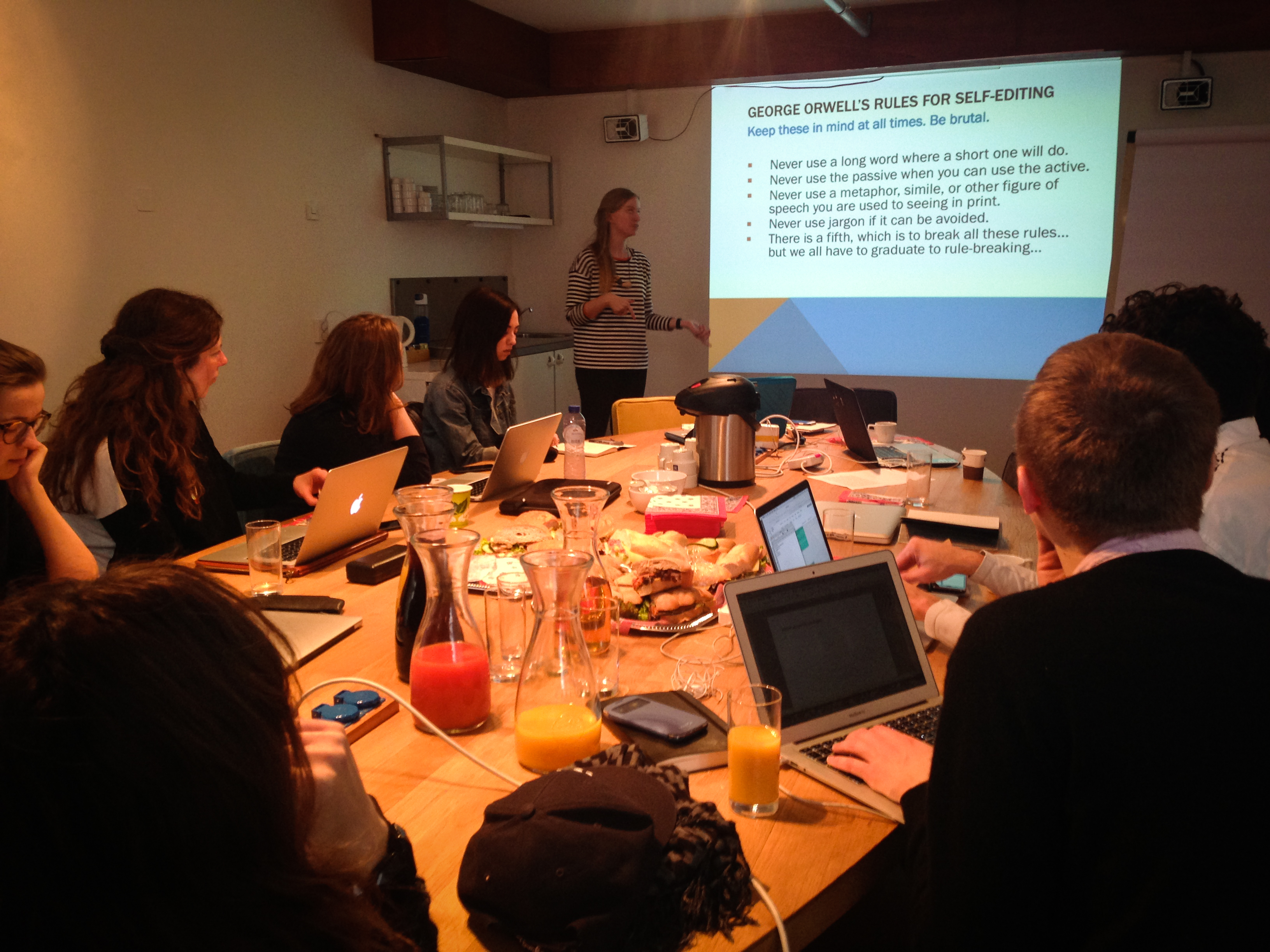
Allan teaching a critical writing workshop at 'Sonic Acts Academy' in February 2016

Allan has a particular interest in foghorns, and following a PhD on the subject at University of the Arts London, her history book The Foghorn’s Lament was published in 2021. She co-led University of the Arts' "Large Objects Moving Air 2018" conference, which featured James Dooley and Chris Watson among its keynote speakers.

In February/ March 2018, she spent a month as writer in residence at Sumburgh Head Lighthouse on the Shetland mainland.

She teaches an eight-week evening course in music journalism.

== Selected publications ==
- Allan, Jennifer Lucy (2021). The Foghorn's Lament : the Disappearing Music of the Coast. London: White Rabbit. ISBN 9781474615037.
- Jennifer Lucy Allan (2018). "Horn Section: John Tyndall's 1873 Foghorn Testing Sessions". In Strang, Veronica; Edensor, Tim; Puckering, Joanna (eds.). From the lighthouse : interdisciplinary reflections on light. Abingdon, Oxon. ISBN 9781472477354. (About John Tyndall)
- Jennifer Lucy Allan (2018). "Disturbing the Peace: The Cloch Foghorn and Changing Coastal Soundscapes in the 19th Century". In Strang, Veronica; Edensor, Tim; Puckering, Joanna (eds.). From the lighthouse : interdisciplinary reflections on light. Abingdon, Oxon. ISBN 9781472477354. (About the lighthouse foghorn at Cloch)
