= Fiona Talkington =

British radio presenter

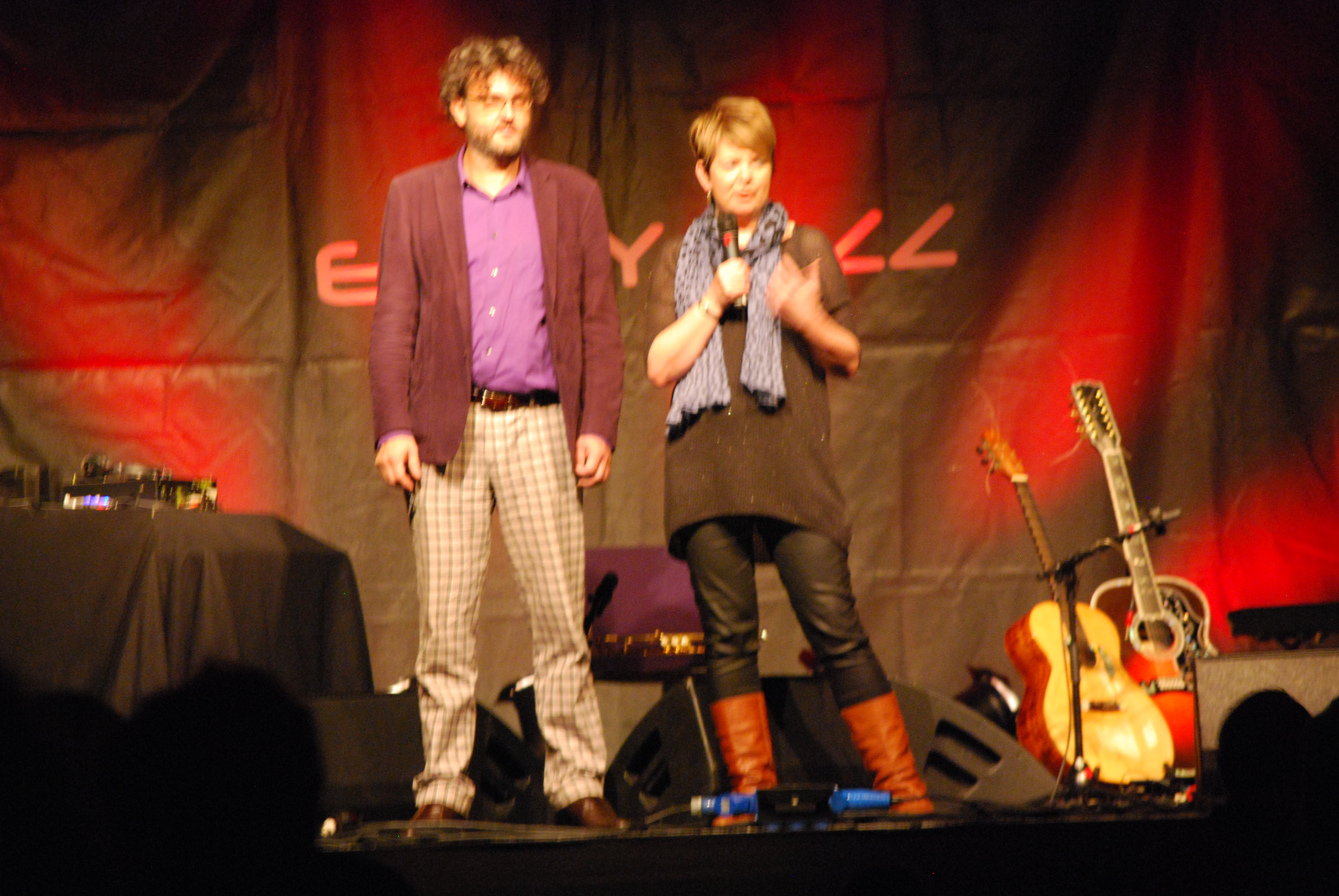
Enjoy Jazz 2013. Fiona Talkington with Festival Director, Rainer Kern

Fiona Talkington is a broadcaster, writer, presenter, and curator. She has been a presenter on BBC Radio 3 since 1989. She was a founding presenter (1999) of the music programme Late Junction.

== BBC ==
For BBC Radio 3, Talkington has presented and produced a wide variety of programmes such as Late Junction, Composer of the Week (working with trumpeter John Wallace on a series on John Philip Sousa and Scott Joplin), Radio 3 Requests, the BBC Proms, Breakfast, Sacred and Profane, Afternoon on 3 and Womad. She also presents live chamber music concerts, broadcast around Europe, from London's Wigmore Hall.

She has also presented for BBC World Service, BBC Radio 4 and for BBC Radio 6 Music, and has produced documentaries and features on music and other topics.

On 24/2/2026 Talkington said farewell to "Classical Live" "The 14th of November 1989, I walked in to Broadcasting House clutching my script for my first programme, Mainly for Pleasure... ...and now I'm hanging up my mike, well, at least for the afternoons.".

== Other work ==
As a curator she has worked extensively with Kings Place in London, curating a 10-day festival of Norwegian arts and music, Scene Norway, in 2008, an Estonian Festival, Eesti Fest, in 2011, and Scene Norway2 in November 2013. For the Royal Opera House, Covent Garden she has curated Voices around the World, and for Nasjonal Jazzscene in Oslo she is curator of the Conexions series which brings together British and Norwegian musicians.

Talkington has been involved in the Norwegian arts world, and has become closely associated with the Punkt Festival in Kristiansand. In 2009 she was awarded the Royal Norwegian Order of Merit for her services to Norwegian Arts, and in 2003 she was presented with the Molde Rose award at the Molde International Jazz Festival.

As a writer she is a regular contributor to Songlines magazine, has written for The Guardian and The Independent newspapers, and has contributed to books in Germany on the ECM record label, and in Norway for a celebration of the 75th anniversary of NOPA.

== Personal ==
Talkington was born in Reading, where she lives, and has two children. From 1985 to 1989 she presented the classical programme Masterworks on Radio 210 (now Heart). She then worked for BBC Wiltshire Sound.

She studied at University of Liverpool, the Open University and University of Reading and has taught for the Open University and University of Reading. She obtained a masters degree in Literature and Visual Arts; in her studies she specialised in the Omega Workshops and the writings of Sir Kenneth Clark. She received an honorary doctorate from University of Reading in December 2023, becoming a Doctor of Letters.

In 2008 Talkington was diagnosed with breast cancer and was treated at the Royal Berkshire Hospital.
