= Nick Luscombe =

British radio DJ

Nick Luscombe (born 30 January 1966) is a British radio DJ, having presented various self-selected new music shows since 1999 for the likes of XFM, BBC 6 Music, BBC World Service, Tokyo FM, InterFM, NME Radio, Samurai FM and Resonance FM.

His Flomotion radio show has been broadcast every week on FM radio since 2000, and hosted on Mixcloud since 2013. He presented BBC Radio 3's Late Junction programme from 2010 to 2019.

During his career Luscombe has worked at London's Institute of Contemporary Arts as Director of Music, at the BBC as a radio producer and at iTunes where he oversaw the editorial for all of Apple's Pan European music stores. He co-founded Musicity in 2010 and is the A&R Consultant at Nonclassical.

He is from Plymouth, south Devon
