= No Government =

Single by Nicolette

from the album Let No-One Live Rent Free in Your Head
- B-side: "You Are Heaven Sent"
- Released: December 1995
- Genre: Dance; hip hop
- Length: 5:34
- Label: Talkin' Loud
- Songwriter: Nicolette
- Producer: Plaid

Nicolette singles chronology
"Sly" (1994)	"No Government" (1995)	"Beautiful Day" (1996)

Music video
- "No Government" on YouTube

"No Government" is a song by Scottish singer-songwriter Nicolette (a.k.a. Nicolette Suwoton), released in December 1995 by Talkin' Loud as the first single from the singer's second album, Let No-One Live Rent Free in Your Head (1995). The song was written by Nicolette and produced by English electronic music duo Plaid, and features a sample from "Shore Leaves" by Tom Waits. It received critical acclaim from music critics and was also featured on the soundtrack to the 1996 film Mission: Impossible, starring Tom Cruise. In the UK, "No Government" reached number 68 on the UK Singles Chart and number 39 on the UK Dance Singles Chart. In 2007, it was re-released and remixed by DJ Tocadisco and Makossa & Megablast, and became a top-20 hit in Belgium.

== Background and release ==
Nicolette performed on two songs on Massive Attack's second album, Protection (1994), "Three" and "Sly", with the latter released as a single. It reached number 24 in the United Kingdom, becoming Massive Attack's fourth top-40 single there. With the wind behind her, Nicolette signed to Gilles Peterson's label, Talkin' Loud, which released her second album, Let No-One Live Rent Free In Your Head. "No Government" was released as the first single from the album in December 1995.

== Critical reception ==
"No Government" was named Single of the Week by publications Melody Maker, Music & Media and NME. Jim Carroll from Irish Times described it as "Ella Fitzgerald slides embellished with an experimental edge". Everett True from Melody Maker wrote, "If everyone lived in their bodies... touching would be such a pastime, sings Nicolette in a voice so smoky and downright licentious I'm surprised it hasn't been impounded at Customs under the Obscene Materials Act. A seductive, slinky, sensuous sweep of a single; dub-wise, we're talking some heavy-duty material here." A reviewer from Music & Media stated, "Although decidedly anarchistic, this is not your run-of-the-mill punk anthem, but a quirky electronic song. If you get past the ultra-exotic intro and Nicolette's deep, eccentric voice, you'll basically find an infectious dance groove, which will go down well with a broader audience than just the alternative crowd." Music Week gave it three out of five, saying, "The squeaky-voiced diva [...] debuts for Talkin' Loud with a masterfully atmospheric double A-side, though her voice remains an acquired taste."

Ben Willmott from NME commented, "You may not be able to get your hands on this little beauty for another week or so, but all the same, there's no other contender in this week's pile of vinyl that comes anywhere near the splendour of this. Nicolette, as the more diligent of us remember, was the uniquely-voiced chanteuse who put the voice to some of pre-junglists Shut Up And Dance's finer moments, as well as hooking up with Massive Attack on occasion. She boasts a voice as unique as Björk or PJ Harvey, high-pitched lullaby lungs that swoop and glide gracefully over this, her first effort since being signed (for shitloads of cash, so the rumour has it) to the much revitalised Talkin' Loud stable. With a mysterious, angular experimental hip-hop style production from Plaid and top-notch junglist mixes from Dilinja and Big Bud added to the arsenal, 'No Government' preaches Utopian, anarchist sentiments in such a seductive manner that Radio 1 will probably have played it to death before they even stop to think what it's about. Which is, let's face it, pretty smart." James Hyman from the Record Mirror Dance Update gave it four out of five and named it "Billie Holiday on acid", writing, "True trainspotters may raise an eyebrow to note Tom Waits (not keen for his music to be used out of context) allowing a sample of 'Shore Leaves' to be used."

== Track listing ==
- 12-inc, UK (1995)

A1. "No Government"
A2. "You Are Heaven Sent"
B1. "No Government in the Jungle" (Bud Brothers Remix)
B2. "No Government As a Way of Life" (Plaid Remix)

- 12-inch vinyl, UK (1995)

A1. "No Government"
A2. "No Government for Partycrashers"
AA3. "No Government in Dillinja's Jungle"
AA4. "No Government in the Biosphere"

- 12-inch vinyl, Germany (2007)

A1. "No Government" (Tocadisco's Lazy Days Remix)
A2. "No Government" (Original Remastered)
B1. "No Government" (Makossa & Megablast Remake)

- CD single, Europe (1995)
1. "No Government" — 5:34
2. "You Are Heaven Sent" — 4:11
3. "No Government in the Jungle" — 5:24
4. "No Government As a Way of Life" — 6:31
- CD maxi-single, Belgium (2007)
1. "No Government" (Tocadisco Radio Edit) — 3:42
2. "No Government" (Tocadisco's Lazy Days Remix) — 6:26
3. "No Government" (Tocadisco Dub) — 6:27
4. "No Government" (Original Remastered) — 5:30
5. "No Government" (Makossa & Megablast Remake) — 9:07
6. "No Government" (Makossa & Megablast Deep Dub) — 7:12

== Charts ==
Chart (1995–1996)	Peak position
Australia (ARIA)	231
Scotland (OCC)	88
UK Singles (OCC)	68
UK Dance (OCC)	39
UK Club Chart (Music Week)	45

Chart (2007)	Peak position
Belgium (Ultratop Flanders)	17
