= Late Junction =

Weekly music programme on BBC Radio 3

- Genre: Experimental music
- Running time: 90 minutes (10:00 pm – 11:30 pm)
- Country of origin: United Kingdom
- Language: English
- Home station: BBC Radio 3
- Hosted by: Verity Sharp; Jennifer Lucy Allan
- Recording studio: Broadcasting House, London
- Original release: 13 September 1999
- Audio format: Stereophonic sound
- Website: www.bbc.co.uk/programmes/b006tp52

Late Junction is a music programme broadcast weekly on Friday nights by BBC Radio 3. Billed as "Journeys in music, ancient to future. The home for adventurous listeners.", the programme has a wide musical scope. It is not uncommon to hear medieval ballads juxtaposed with 21st-century electronica, or jazz followed by international folk music followed by an ambient track. Each edition of the programme runs for 90 minutes.

== History ==
The programme was created soon after Roger Wright took over as controller of BBC Radio 3, as part of changes with which Wright believed that he was addressing "this feeling people had that they didn't want to put Radio 3 on unless they were going to listen carefully". The first programme was broadcast on 13 September 1999 and produced by Antony Pitts.

Late Junction won a Sony gold award in 2003 for Music Programming. The show was described as "A radio jewel. Is there a show like this anywhere else in the radio world? Everyone who hears the show falls in love with it. Surprising, revealing, accessible. Brilliantly programmed - a show where the real star is the music."

The programme's main regular presenters are Verity Sharp and Jennifer Lucy Allan, who alternate as solo presenters. Before the shift from three 90-minute shows per week to a single two-hour broadcast in late 2019, other regular presenters included the show's founding presenter Fiona Talkington, Max Reinhardt, Nick Luscombe, Anne Hilde Neset, and Mara Carlyle. Other former presenters include Shaheera Asante (until 2006), and Robert Sandall, until his death from prostate cancer in 2010.

While the selection of music to be played in any one programme is the result of a collaboration between producer and presenter, some individual preferences can be detected. Fiona Talkington, for instance, tended to play more conventional jazz and Scandinavian music and Verity Sharp more folk music, especially that featuring fiddle-playing. Nick Luscombe's shows often featured music from Japan.

The show features occasional Late Junction Sessions, where two musicians or groups, from different genres, are introduced and record together, exclusively for Late Junction, for the first time. After broadcast, these sessions are available as a podcast for 30 days.

In March 2019, BBC Radio 3 Controller Alan Davey announced that Late Junction was being cut from three episodes a week to a single two-hour slot on Fridays from Autumn 2019. More than 500 people from the world of music, including Brian Eno, Billy Bragg, Jarvis Cocker, Martin Carthy and Eliza Carthy signed an open letter objecting to the cut.

From April 2024, as part of a new schedule introduced by BBC Radio 3 Controller Sam Jackson, Late Junction's weekly running time was cut by a further 30 minutes to 90 minutes and it also moved to the earlier start time of 10pm.

== Presenters ==
=== Current presenters ===
- Verity Sharp
- Jennifer Lucy Allan

=== Former presenters ===
- Max Reinhardt
- Anne Hilde Neset
- Fiona Talkington
- Nick Luscombe
- Mara Carlyle
- Shaheera Asante
- Robert Sandall (died in 2010)
