= Max Reinhardt (radio presenter) =

British radio presenter

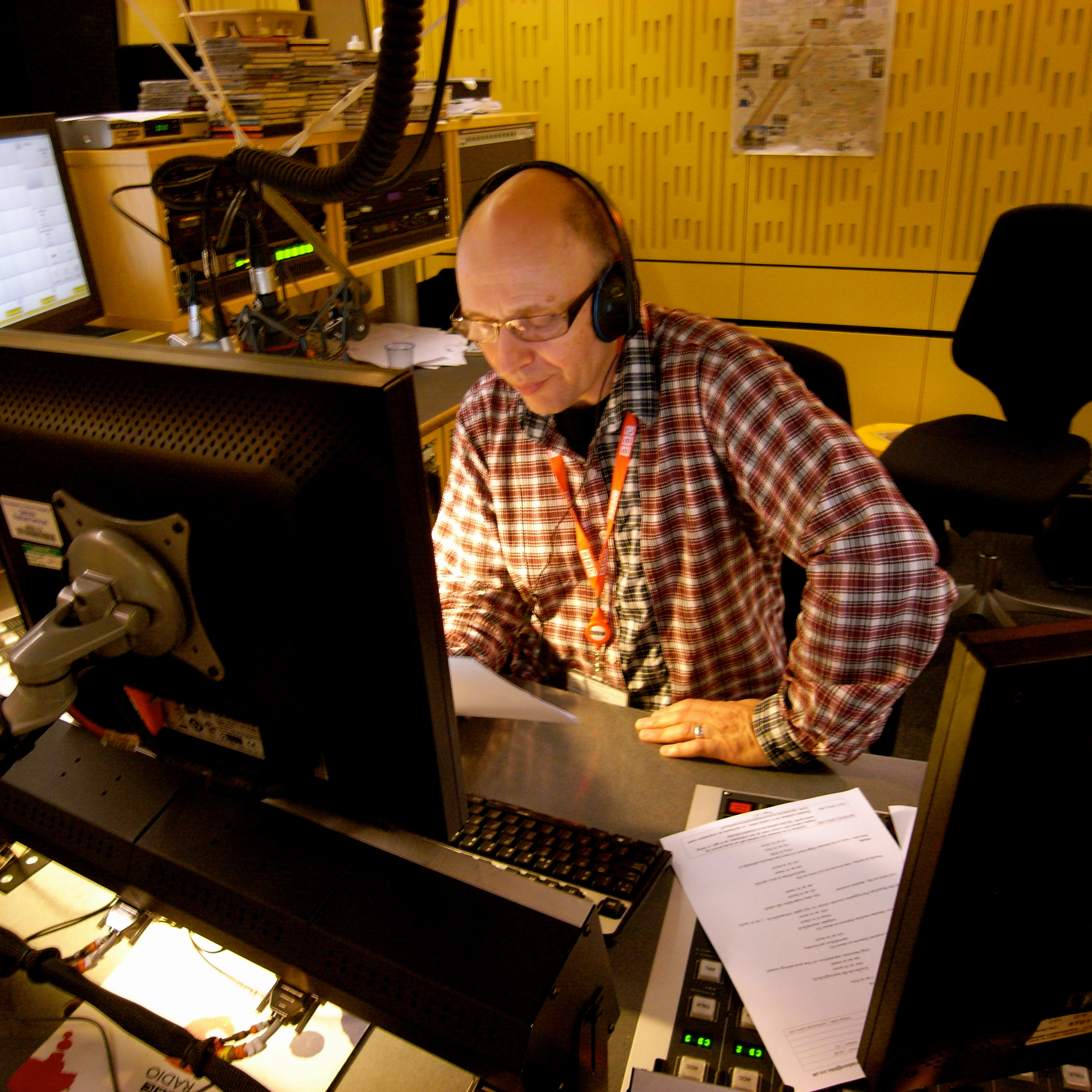
- David Bennett in the BBC Radio 3 studio in June 2012
- Born: 14 May 1951 (age 75); London, England
- Occupations: Broadcaster, musical director and writer
- Employer: Self

Max Reinhardt, birth name David Lewis Bennett (born 14 May 1951) is a radio presenter who presented Late Junction on BBC Radio 3. In 2020, he started to present the Max Reinhardt's Late Late Lunch Show on Soho Radio. In 2026, his show on Morley Radio, the community radio station and podcast production hub of Morley College London, is The Maximum Reinhardt Show.

== Career ==
David using the sobriquet Max presented shows for BBC Radio 3 and BBC World Service for 22 years. For 11 years, David was a presenter for Late Junction, a music programme which used to be broadcast three nights a week on BBC Radio 3. In addition, he was the musical consultant/co-scriptwriter for the South African music series Freedom Sounds on BBC Radio 2, presented a documentary on BBC Radio 4 about his music theatre piece Ketubah and, with Rita Ray was a regular presenter of Global Beats on BBC World Service and they also made a Sunday Feature, nearly 20 years ago, for BBC Radio 3 'In Search of Fela Kuti'. Currently he presents the bi-weekly Late Late Lunch Show on Soho Radio and the monthly Maximum Reinhardt Show on Morley Radio. With Rita Ray he also presents Mwalimu Express Radio Show Soho Radio.

Through the late 80's and onwards, Max and Rita worked together as Dj's in a series of clubs, from the Mambo Inn (with Gerry Lyseight) to The Shrine, mixing Latin and African music with Reggae, Funk, Jazz and Soul, increasingly working with live artists in their internationally touring electro acoustic band The Shrine Synchro System.

As well as his work with the BBC, Max was the co-founder with Tim Webb and musical director at Oily Cart, a theatre company established in 1981 that works with children with complex disabilities. His other musical direction work includes music for shows with Ockham's Razor, Proteus Theatre and for the BBC Children's TV series Playdays. He is an associate artist with Oxford Contemporary Music and the founder of The Instant Orchestra who appear annually as The Instant Scorehestra in the Lavish Lounge at the Latitude Festival in Suffolk, improvising film scores to feature films old and new. More recently he has joined the Oxford Improvisers.

He also edited the memoirs of Jewish-Algerian pianist Maurice El Mediouni, 'A Memoir - From Oran to Marseilles(1938-1992, translated from the French by Jonathan Walton published in 2017 by Repeater Books.

== Personal life ==
Max's parents were Adele Bennett, who worked in the Fashion industry and Morris Bennett, a chartered accountant & antique dealer. They also had a daughter, Deborah, sister to David. He attended Quintin [Kynaston] School in St John's Wood before reading English & American Arts and Letters at Exeter University, UK. David Bennett now lives in Oxford, England and has always enjoyed listening to and playing a wide range of music.
