= Nicolette (musician) =

- Born: Nicolette Love Suwoton; 1964 (age 61–62); Glasgow, Scotland
- Genres: Breakbeat; jungle; trip hop; drum and bass; IDM; ambient; world; industrial
- Occupations: Singer, musician, songwriter, DJ, actor

Nicolette (full name Nicolette Love Suwoton, born 1964) is a Scottish singer-songwriter of Nigerian parentage, residing in London for most of her life, and has also lived in Nigeria, Switzerland, France, and Belgium. Her music, although falling broadly into the field of electronica, is characterised by many influences, including, jazz, classical, blues, folk, and African. Her singles "Sly" (with Massive Attack) and "No Government" received critical acclaim and appeared in the UK chart.

== Career ==
She has released three solo albums, as well as a DJ mix album for the DJ-Kicks series, and featured on "Three" and "Sly", two songs on Massive Attack's 1994 Protection album. She has worked with many other collaborators in the electronic music field, including Plaid, Alec Empire, and 4hero. She released her single "No Government" after signing to the Talkin' Loud label in 1995. In 1999, she set up her own record label, Early Records, upon leaving Talkin’ Loud to release quirky pop anthems. According to Nicolette, Early Records' music policy is: "innovative pop music." Nicolette's 2005 album, Life Loves Us, was released through the label. One single and a six-track EP were released from the album in the following year.

In 2007, Nicolette's "No Government" was re-released and remixed by DJ Tocadisco and Makossa & Megablast. In 2008, Nicolette contributed vocals to John Tejada's album Where, she sang and co-wrote the track "Desire". She released a single called "Love" with DJ Cam in March 2010. More recently she worked with Samuel Yirga on his album and released an EP. She also acted in Solveig Anspach's film Queen of Montreuil.

== Discography ==
=== Albums ===
- Now Is Early (1992)
- Let No-One Live Rent Free in Your Head (1996)
- DJ-Kicks (1997)
- Life Loves Us (2005)
- Modern Stories EP (2012)

=== Singles ===
- "Sly" (with Massive Attack) 1994
- "No Government" 1995

=== Non album tracks ===
- "I'm Raving" (with L.A. Style) 1993
- "Three" (with Massive Attack) 1994
- "Extork" (with Plaid) 1997
- "Contradictions" (with Bang Gang) 2003
- "So Loud" (with Phui) 2007
- "Communication" (with Filewile) 2007
- "Desire" (with John Tejada) 2008
- "Love" (with DJ Cam) 2010
- "Birthday" (with TJ Kong and Nuno dos Santos) 2010
- "Something Happened" (with TJ Kong and Nuno dos Santos) 2010
- "I Am the Black Gold of the Sun" (with Samuel Yirga) 2012
- "African Diaspora" (with Samuel Yirga) 2012
