= Plaid (band) =

English electronic music duo

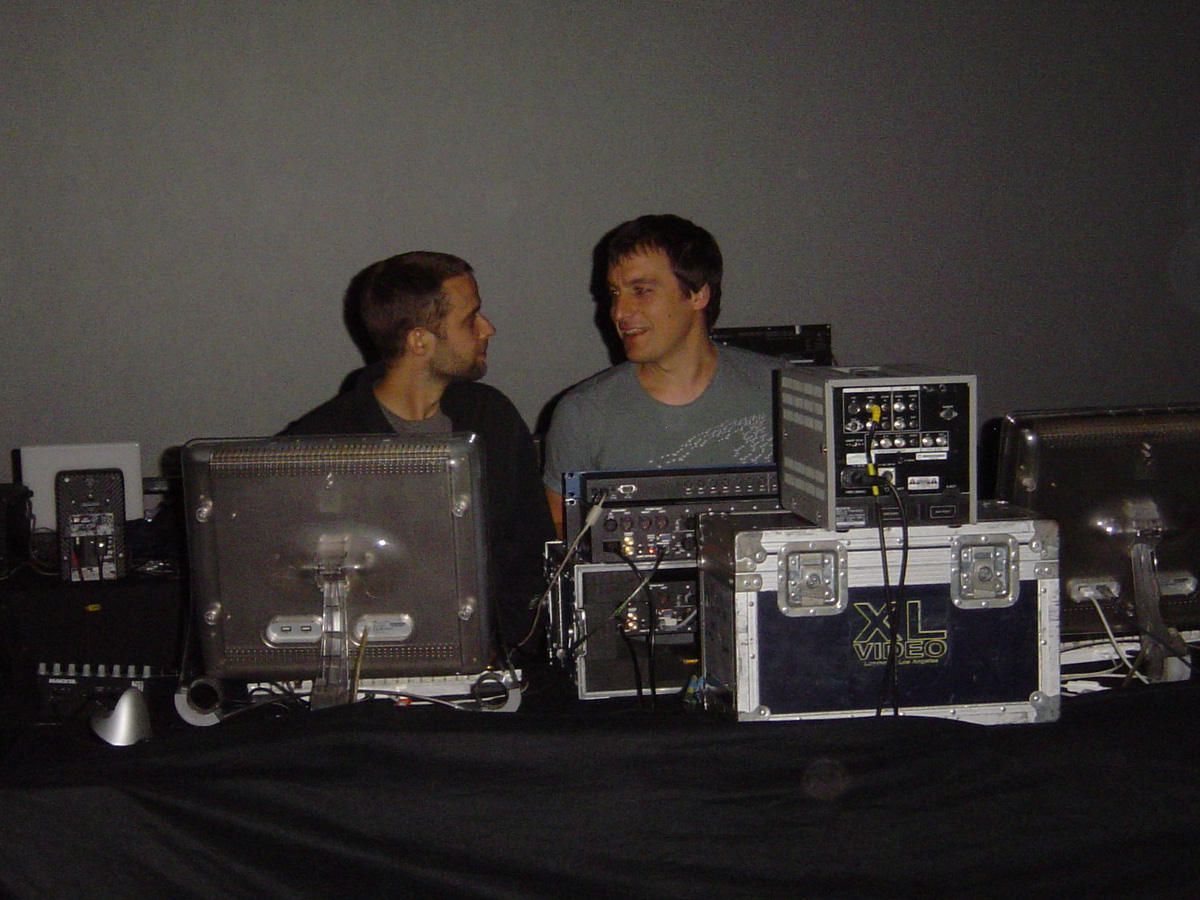
- Plaid at the bfi London IMAX Cinema at Optronica Festival on 20 July 2005

Background information
- Origin: London, England
- Genres: IDM; techno
- Years active: 1991–present
- Labels: Warp; Nothing; Black Dog Productions; General Production Recordings
- Spinoff of: The Black Dog
- Members: Andy Turner; Ed Handley
- Website: plaidmusic.co.uk

Plaid (/plæd/) are an English electronic music duo composed of Andy Turner and Ed Handley. They were founding members of The Black Dog and used many other names, such as Atypic (Andy Turner) and Balil (Ed Handley), before settling on Plaid. They have collaborated with singers Mara Carlyle, Nicolette and Björk, and have released records on the labels Clear, Peacefrog, Black Dog Productions, and Warp (along with Trent Reznor's label Nothing Records).

Aside from their own material, Plaid have done extensive remix work for many other artists, including Red Snapper, Björk, Goldfrapp, and The Irresistible Force. Parts in the Post (2003) and Stem Sell (2021) contains a lot of Plaid's remix work to date.

Plaid collaborated with video artist Bob Jaroc for their live performances and on the 5.1 audio/visual project entitled Greedy Baby. The project was completed on 20 July 2005, and was first shown at the Queen Elizabeth Hall in the South Bank Centre, and subsequently at the BFI Imax cinema in Waterloo, London. Greedy Baby was released on DVD from Warp on 26 June 2006.

In 2006, Plaid composed and performed the original score to Michael Arias' anime film Tekkonkinkreet, and then went on to rejoin Arias for his second feature, Heaven's Door, as well as two of his subsequent short films.

In 2009, they contributed a cover of a Plone song to the Warp20 (Recreated) compilation.

Plaid's music has been used in the LittleBigPlanet series. In 2014, they helped produce some of the soundtrack for LittleBigPlanet 3.

== Musical style ==
Plaid's style crosses a number of genres - electronica, dance, ambient, experimental - and is sometimes to referred to by some critics as "post-techno." They are known to employ a variety of time-signatures in their music and often create syncopated beats and melodies using a variety of real instruments and samples.

== Discography ==
=== Albums ===
- Mbuki Mvuki (1991)
- Not for Threes (1997)
- Rest Proof Clockwork (1999)
- Double Figure (2001)
- Spokes (2003)
- Greedy Baby (2006; CD/DVD with Bob Jaroc)
- Scintilli (2011) – UK chart peak: No. 167
- Reachy Prints (2014) – UK chart peak: No. 95
- The Digging Remedy (2016)
- Polymer (2019)
- Feorm Falorx (2022)

=== EPs ===
- Scoobs in Columbia (1992)
- Android (1995)
- Undoneson (1997)
- Peel Session (1999)
- Booc (2000)
- P-Brane (2002)
- On Other Hands (2016)
- Peel Session 2 TX 08/05/99 (2019)

=== Soundtrack albums ===
- Tekkonkinkreet Original Soundtrack (2006; Soundtrack for Michael Arias's anime Tekkonkinkreet)
- Heaven's Door (2008; Soundtrack for Michael Arias's movie Heaven's Door)

=== Compilations ===
- Bytes (1993; A Black Dog Productions album that includes two Plaid songs, Object Orient and Yamemm)
- Trainer (2000; a collection of early material, including all of the Mbuki Mvuki album)
- Plaid Remixes – Parts in the Post (2003; remix collection)
- Dial P (2003; mix album inserted in deliveries of pre-ordered copies of Spokes)
- Tekkonkinkreet Remix Tekkinkonkreet (2007; remixes of the songs from Tekkonkinkreet by Derrick May, Prefuse 73, Atom, Vex'd and others)
- Induction (2011; an exclusive to Warp, download-only compilation, chosen by Plaid ahead of the new album Scintilli)
- Stem Sell (2021; remix collection)

=== Audiovisual project ===
- Greedy Baby (2005)
