= DJ-Kicks =

Series of DJ mix albums from !K7 Records

DJ-Kicks (styled DJ-KiCKS on all cover artwork) is a series of DJ mix albums, mixed by various artists for the independent record label !K7 Records.

== History ==
DJ-Kicks started out in 1993 as a compilation of electronic DJ-style mixes in the techno or house genres, with the then-novel twist of being targeted to a home listening audience. Soon afterwards, both the choice of compilers and the genres included were expanded: In addition to DJs, more and more producers (like Terranova), remixers (like Kruder & Dorfmeister), bands (like the Stereo MCs) and musicians (like Nicolette) compiled DJ-Kicks albums. The actual music began to vary wildly as well, ranging from Trüby Trio's downbeat jazz sound to Kemistry & Storm's aggressive drum and bass. Still, all contributions remain broadly within the electronic music genre.

The first DJ-Kicks release was C.J. Bolland's in 1995, and the series is still regularly expanded. As of May 2025, there are 85 releases in the series, with a release rate of about three new entries each year. 2016 and 2018 were particularly busy with five new mixes in each year, more than any other year so far. Some of the DJ-Kicks mixes are very popular and counted among the regular albums of the compiler, most notably the one by Kruder & Dorfmeister. The entries by Erlend Øye, Four Tet, James Holden, John Talabot, DJ Koze and Moodymann have also received particular acclaim. The DJ-Kicks series has been called "the most important DJ-mix series ever" by Mixmag. The 26th release was a special celebratory (and unmixed) "best of" compilation, DJ-Kicks: The Exclusives. It consisted of original tracks by the DJs who had mixed the earlier albums in the series.

== DJ-Kicks releases ==
Number	Album	Artist	Released	Catalogue number
1	DJ-Kicks: C.J. Bolland	C.J. Bolland	4 September 1995	!K7038
2	DJ-Kicks: Carl Craig	Carl Craig	25 March 1996	!K7042
3	DJ-Kicks: Claude Young	Claude Young	3 June 1996	!K7045
4	DJ-Kicks: Kruder & Dorfmeister	Kruder & Dorfmeister	19 August 1996	!K7046
5	DJ-Kicks: Stacey Pullen	Stacey Pullen	14 October 1996	!K7049
6	DJ-Kicks: Nicolette	Nicolette	10 March 1997	!K7054
7	DJ-Kicks: The Black Album	Rockers Hi-Fi	19 May 1997	!K7056
8	DJ-Kicks: DJ Cam	DJ Cam	18 November 1997	!K7060
9	DJ-Kicks: Terranova	Terranova	19 January 1998	!K7064
10	DJ-Kicks: Smith & Mighty	Smith & Mighty	9 March 1998	!K7065
11	DJ-Kicks: Andrea Parker	Andrea Parker	31 August 1998	!K7071
12	DJ-Kicks: Kemistry & Storm	Kemistry & Storm	25 January 1999	!K7074
13	DJ-Kicks: Thievery Corporation	Thievery Corporation	10 May 1999	!K7076
14	DJ-Kicks: Kid Loco	Kid Loco	18 October 1999	!K7081
15	DJ-Kicks: Stereo MCs	Stereo MCs	27 March 2000	!K7082
16	DJ-Kicks: Nightmares on Wax	Nightmares on Wax	2 October 2000	!K7093
17	DJ-Kicks: Trüby Trio	Trüby Trio	27 August 2001	!K7104
18	DJ-Kicks: Vikter Duplaix	Vikter Duplaix	28 January 2002	!K7115
19	DJ-Kicks: Playgroup	Playgroup	1 July 2002	!K7127
20	DJ-Kicks: Tiga	Tiga	1 December 2002	!K7142
21	DJ-Kicks: Chicken Lips	Chicken Lips	3 November 2003	!K7155
22	DJ-Kicks: Erlend Øye	Erlend Øye	19 April 2004	!K7161
23	DJ-Kicks: Daddy G	Daddy G (of Massive Attack)	25 October 2004	!K7170
24	DJ-Kicks: The Glimmers	The Glimmers	11 April 2005	!K7178
25	DJ-Kicks: Annie	Annie	17 October 2005	!K7190
—	DJ-Kicks: The Exclusives	unmixed DJ-Kicks artist compilation	27 February 2006	!K7200
26	DJ-Kicks: Four Tet	Four Tet	26 June 2006	!K7203
27	DJ-Kicks: Henrik Schwarz	Henrik Schwarz	16 October 2006	!K7207
28	DJ-Kicks: Hot Chip	Hot Chip	21 May 2007	!K7213
29	DJ-Kicks: Booka Shade	Booka Shade	22 October 2007	!K7222
30	DJ-Kicks: Chromeo	Chromeo	28 September 2009	!K7247
31	DJ-Kicks: Juan Maclean	Juan Maclean	April 2010	!K7255
32	DJ-Kicks: James Holden	James Holden	25 May 2010	!K7261
33	DJ-Kicks: Kode9	Kode9	22 June 2010	!K7262
34	DJ-Kicks: Apparat	Apparat	25 October 2010	!K7270
35	DJ-Kicks: Wolf + Lamb vs Soul Clap	Wolf + Lamb, Soul Clap	15 March 2011	!K7283
36	DJ-Kicks: Motor City Drum Ensemble	Motor City Drum Ensemble	July 2011	!K7285
37	DJ-Kicks: Scuba	Scuba	17 October 2011	!K7291
38	DJ-Kicks: Gold Panda	Gold Panda	7 November 2011	!K7292
—	DJ-Kicks: The Exclusives Vol. II	unmixed DJ-Kicks artist compilation	5 March 2012	!K7300
39	DJ-Kicks: Photek	Photek	26 March 2012	!K7293
40	DJ-Kicks: Maya Jane Coles	Maya Jane Coles	16 April 2012	!K7295
41	DJ-Kicks: Digitalism	Digitalism	16 April 2012	!K7298
42	DJ-Kicks: Hercules and Love Affair	Hercules and Love Affair	26 October 2012	!K7301
43	DJ-Kicks: Maceo Plex	Maceo Plex	29 April 2013	!K7306
44	DJ-Kicks: John Talabot	John Talabot	8 November 2013	!K7312
45	DJ-Kicks: Breach	Breach	15 November 2013	!K7314
46	DJ-Kicks: Brandt Brauer Frick	Brandt Brauer Frick	21 February 2014	!K7311
47	DJ-Kicks: Will Saul	Will Saul	16 June 2014	!K7316
48	DJ-Kicks: Nina Kraviz	Nina Kraviz	January 2015	!K7315
49	DJ-Kicks: Actress	Actress	May 2015	!K7319
50	DJ-Kicks: DJ Koze	DJ Koze	June 2015	!K7325
51	DJ-Kicks: Seth Troxler	Seth Troxler	October 2015	!K7324
52	DJ-Kicks: Moodymann	Moodymann	February 2016	!K7327
53	DJ-Kicks: Dâm-Funk	Dâm-Funk	27 May 2016	!K7332
54	DJ-Kicks: Jackmaster	Jackmaster	8 July 2016	!K7335
55	DJ-Kicks: Marcel Dettmann	Marcel Dettmann	14 October 2016	!K7340
56	DJ-Kicks: Daniel Avery	Daniel Avery	11 November 2016	!K7342
57	DJ-Kicks: Matthew Dear	Matthew Dear	27 January 2017	!K7346
58	DJ-Kicks: Michael Mayer	Michael Mayer	16 May 2017	!K7348
—	DJ-Kicks: The Exclusives Vol. III	unmixed DJ-Kicks artist compilation	2 June 2017	!K7357
59	DJ-Kicks: DJ Tennis	DJ Tennis	14 July 2017	!K7338
60	DJ-Kicks: Lone	Lone	29 September 2017	!K7353
61	DJ-Kicks: Kerri Chandler	Kerri Chandler	20 October 2017	!K7358
62	DJ-Kicks: Deetron	Deetron	9 March 2018	!K7359
63	DJ-Kicks: Forest Swords	Forest Swords	18 May 2018	!K7365
64	DJ-Kicks: DJ Seinfeld	DJ Seinfeld	13 July 2018	!K7370
65	DJ-Kicks: Mount Kimbie	Mount Kimbie	28 September 2018	!K7364
66	DJ-Kicks: Robert Hood	Robert Hood	16 November 2018	!K7376
67	DJ-Kicks: Leon Vynehall	Leon Vynehall	1 February 2019	!K7377
68	DJ-Kicks: Laurel Halo	Laurel Halo	27 March 2019	!K7375
69	DJ-Kicks: Peggy Gou	Peggy Gou	28 June 2019	!K7382
70	DJ-Kicks: Kamaal Williams	Kamaal Williams	8 November 2019	!K7388
71	DJ-Kicks: Mr. Scruff	Mr. Scruff	27 March 2020	!K7387
72	DJ-Kicks: Avalon Emerson	Avalon Emerson	18 September 2020	!K7395
73	DJ-Kicks: Special Request	Special Request	19 March 2021	!K7394
74	DJ-Kicks: Jayda G	Jayda G	14 May 2021	!K7402
75	DJ-Kicks: Disclosure	Disclosure	15 October 2021	!K7398
76	DJ-Kicks: Jessy Lanza	Jessy Lanza	19 November 2021	!K7407
77	DJ-Kicks: Cinthie	Cinthie	1 April 2022	!K7412
78	DJ-Kicks: Theo Parrish	Theo Parrish	28 October 2022	!K7414
79	DJ-Kicks: Elkka	Elkka	26 April 2023	!K7424
—	DJ-Kicks: The Exclusives Vol. 4	unmixed DJ-Kicks artist compilation	8 August 2023	!K7435
80	DJ-Kicks: HAAi	HAAi	10 November 2023	!K7419
81	DJ-Kicks: DJ BORING	DJ BORING	12 July 2024	!K7441
82	DJ-Kicks: Honey Dijon	Honey Dijon	18 October 2024	!K7405
83	DJ-Kicks: Steven Julien	Steven Julien	22 November 2024	!K7432
84	DJ-Kicks: Logic1000	Logic1000	28 March 2025	!K7426
85	DJ-Kicks: Quantic	Quantic	30 May 2025	!K7443D
86	DJ-Kicks: Modeselektor	Modeselektor	12 September 2025	!K7457D
87	DJ-Kicks: Eris Drew	Eris Drew	14 November 2025	!K7459D
88	DJ-Kicks: Sofia Kourtesis	Sofia Kourtesis	27 March 2026	!K7460D
89	DJ-Kicks: TEED	TEED	25 June 2026	!K7452
90	DJ-Kicks: Djrum	Djrum	16 October 2026	!K7454
91	DJ-Kicks: Dam Swindle	Dam Swindle	20 November 2026	!K7465

== Similar DJ series ==
- Back to Mine
- Late Night Tales
- Solid Steel
- Fabric Live
