= DJ-Kicks: The Exclusives =

Compilation album by Various Artists
- Released: 27 February 2006
- Genre: Electronica / House / Downtempo / Hip Hop / Techno
- Length: 77:06
- Label: Studio !K7 !K7200LP (LP) !K7200CD (CD)

DJ-Kicks chronology
Annie (2005)	The Exclusives (2006)	Four Tet (2006)

Professional ratings
Review scores
Source	Rating
Allmusic	3.5/5 stars

DJ-Kicks: The Exclusives is a compilation album released on the Studio !K7 independent record label. Although it commemorates 25 DJ mix album in the popular DJ-Kicks series, this album is unmixed. Instead, it is a "best of" selection of tracks that were produced and performed by the DJs who mixed some of the earlier DJ-Kicks albums. Each of the tracks were exclusive to the DJ Kicks series and are available on those previous mix albums.

The CD includes postcards for each of the mix albums represented.

== Track listing ==
1. "Black Baby" – Kruder & Dorfmeister – 6:19
2. "Bronx Theme" – DJ Cam – 7:47
3. "Contact" – Terranova – 4:49
4. "It Takes a Thief" – Thievery Corporation – 4:09
5. "Flyin' On 747" – Kid Loco – 4:56
6. "High Jazz" – Trüby Trio – 8:12
7. "Sensuality" – Vikter Duplaix – 4:00
8. "Behind The Wheel" (Electroca$h mix) – Playgroup – 4:48
9. "Hot in Here" (featuring Jake Shears) – Tiga – 3:52
10. "Bad Skin" – Chicken Lips – 4:12
11. "The Black Keys Work" – Erlend Øye – 3:37
12. "Cassette" – The Glimmers – 5:56
13. "The Wedding" – Annie – 5:09 Producer – Röyksopp
14. "DJ-Kicks" – Carl Craig – 9:20
