= In Daytona Yellow =

Studio album by Leon Vynehall
- Released: October 3, 2025
- Length: 38:58
- Label: Ooze Inc
- Producer: Leon Vynehall

Leon Vynehall chronology
Rare, Forever (2021)	In Daytona Yellow (2025)

Singles from In Daytona Yellow
- 1. "Mirror's Edge" Released: 11 April 2025

In Daytona Yellow is the third studio album by British musician Leon Vynehall. It was released on 3 October 2025, via Ooze Inc. Vynehall stated about the album, "It's about the rejection of perfection and embracing vulnerability. I wanted to let go of that pressure—to say goodbye to a former version of myself and move forward." "Mirror's Edge" was released as a single on 11 April 2025, featuring vocalist Poison Anna.

== Reception ==
Professional ratings
Review scores
Source	Rating
Clash	8/10
Narc	5/5
Pitchfork	6.7/10

Clash's Amelia Kelly called the album "a bold and vulnerable comeback" and commented, "through In Daytona Yellow, we witness Leon Vynehall's spiritual and musical metamorphosis," giving it a rating of eight. Rating the album 6.7 in their review for Pitchfork, Maxie Younger opined, "In Daytona Yellow strives to position its jack-of-all-trades style as synecdoche for the album's conceptual intent," noting "Stretched to its capacity, Vynehall's versatility turns workmanlike." In a 5/5 review for Narc, Jonathan Coll described the release as "an album that combines all of the most wonderful elements of his previous works."

== Track listing ==
In Daytona Yellow track listing
No.	Title	Lyrics	Music	Length
1.	"Life Is Not Enough"	Leon Vynehall; Harvey Grant	Vynehall; Grant	3:34
2.	"Mirror's Edge" (featuring Poison Anna)	Vynehall	Vynehall	3:57
3.	"A Jagged Promise"	Vynehall; Grant	Vynehall; Grant	1:26
4.	"Scab" (featuring Tyson)	Vynehall; Tyson	Vynehall	4:19
5.	"Whip" (featuring Jeshi)	Vynehall; Grant; Jeshi	Vynehall; Grant	3:48
6.	"Cruel Love" (featuring Beau Nox)	Vynehall	Vynehall	4:39
7.	"Slow Devotion"	Vynehall	Vynehall	4:47
8.	"Romantica" (featuring Kenzie TTH)	Vynehall	Vynehall	4:17
9.	"You Strange Precious Thing" (featuring Chartreuse)	Vynehall; Michael Wagstaff; Harriet Wilson	Vynehall	4:10
10.	"New Skin / Old Body"	Vynehall	Vynehall	3:01
Total length:				38:58
