= DJ-Kicks: Deetron =

Compilation album by Deetron
- Released: March 9, 2018
- Genre: Electronic, Pop
- Length: 1:17:53
- Label: Studio !K7

DJ-Kicks chronology
Kerri Chandler (2017)	Deetron (2018)	Forest Swords (2018)

Deetron chronology
Balance, Vol. 20 (2011)	DJ-Kicks: Deetrong

Professional ratings
Review scores
Source	Rating
Resident Advisor	3.7/5

DJ-Kicks: Deetron is a DJ mix album, mixed by Deetron. It was released in March 2018 under the Studio !K7 independent record label as part of their DJ-Kicks series.

== Track list ==
No.	Title	Length
1.	"Goodbye World/Gifted and Blessed: The Dreamer" (featuring Carl Craig)	2:32
2.	"Love Lost" (featuring Linkwood)	0:47
3.	"Schoolbell/Treehouse" (featuring Indian Ocean)	1:51
4.	"Criticize" (featuring Soulphiction)	2:11
5.	"Waterfall" (featuring Mr. Fingers)	2:34
6.	"Song With Blue" (featuring Roman Flügel)	2:06
7.	"Plastikthai/Voyage" (featuring Dresvn, Burnt Friedman)	2:20
8.	"Swing Fantasy" (featuring Spacetime Continuum)	2:50
9.	"Linking Tunnel/The Plan" (featuring Julie Dexter, Morgan Geist)	1:49
10.	"Komt Goed" (featuring Aardvarck)	2:34
11.	"Sincerely" (featuring Circulation)	2:19
12.	"Let’s Love" (featuring DJ Koze)	1:47
13.	"Morning Factory/Choose Me" (featuring Ani, Chez Damier, Ron Trent)	2:57
14.	"Only" (featuring Nikola Gala)	1:40
15.	"Moon Dance" (featuring Keith Worthy)	1:32
16.	"Thing 1" (featuring Paul W. Teebrooke)	3:45
17.	"Children of the E" (featuring Radio Slave)	2:32
18.	"Cry With the Stars"	1:49
19.	"Rework" (featuring A Made Up Sound)	1:31
20.	"Hotline Riddim" (featuring HNNY, Hotline)	1:03
21.	"Kilode" (featuring Tony Allen)	5:39
22.	"Benzine Electronics" (featuring Pepe)	3:36
23.	"Flux" (featuring Black Dog Productions)	2:47
24.	"Untitled"	1:17
25.	"All My Heart" (featuring DJ Bone)	2:32
26.	"Bissau" (featuring Francis Bebey)	1:59
27.	"Let the Church" (featuring Floorplan)	2:01
28.	"Seventh City" (featuring Terrace)	1:30
29.	"Kaotic Harmony" (featuring Derrick May)	2:11
30.	"Flagged Up" (featuring Equiknoxx)	3:59
31.	"Dreamers 6.1" (featuring DJ Bone)	1:15
32.	"Optical Illusions" (featuring Ukrainian, Stanislav Tolkachev)	2:08
33.	"Old Fashioned" (featuring K-Lone)	2:08
34.	"Strange Emotion" (featuring Jessy Lanza)	2:22
