= Pitchfork Music Festival Paris 2013 =

Music festival

- Dates: 31 October–2 November 2013
- Locations: Grande halle de la Villette, Paris, France
- Website: pitchforkmusicfestival.fr

The Pitchfork Music Festival Paris 2013 was held on 31 October to 2 November 2013 at the Grande halle de la Villette, Paris, France. The festival was headlined by The Knife, Disclosure and Hot Chip.

== Lineup ==
Headline performers are listed in boldface. Artists listed from latest to earliest set times.

Thursday, 31 October	Friday, 1 November	Saturday, 2 November
**The Knife**; The Haxan Cloak; Darkside; Mount Kimbie; Savages; Mac DeMarco; No Age; Blood Orange; Iceage; Only Real	**Disclosure**; Danny Brown; Connan Mockasin; Ariel Pink; Junip; Colin Stetson; Warpaint; Jagwar Ma; Deafheaven; Petit Fantôme	A-Trak; Todd Terje; Glass Candy; **Hot Chip**; Panda Bear; Yo La Tengo; Omar Souleyman; Baths; Youth Lagoon; Sky Ferreira; Majical Cloudz; Pegase; Empress Of

=== Opening Night and After Party lineups ===
The opening night was held on 30 October 2013 at Le Trabendo. The after parties were held in collaboration with Red Bull Music Academy at Le Trabendo on 31 October and 1 November 2013.

Opening Night (Wednesday, 30 October)	Afterparty (Thursday, 31 October)	Afterparty (Friday, 1 November)
Julianna Barwick; The Dodos; Jackson Scott; Forest Swords	John Talabot; Pional; Genius of Time; Evans	Jon Hopkins; Jacques Greene; Evian Christ; Kuage; Sundae
