= DJ-Kicks: Brandt Brauer Frick =

Compilation album

Compilation album by Brandt Brauer Frick
- Released: 25 February 2014
- Genre: Club
- Length: 1:14:59
- Label: Studio !K7

DJ-Kicks chronology
DJ-Kicks: Breach (2013)	DJ-Kicks: Brandt Brauer Frick (2014)

Professional ratings
Aggregate scores
Source	Rating
Metacritic	68/100
Review scores
Source	Rating
AllMusic	3.5/5 stars
Exclaim!	7/10

DJ-Kicks: Brandt Brauer Frick is a DJ mix album by German electronic musician Brandt Brauer Frick. It was released on 25 February 2014 under Studio !K7 independent record label as part of their DJ-Kicks series.

== Track list ==
1. Jan Jelinek - HipBird
2. Inkswel - Australaborialis
3. Theo Parrish - Electric Alleycat
4. Dollkraut - Rollercoaster
5. William Onyeabor - Better Change Your Mind
6. Max Graef - Bummse
7. Brandt Brauer Frick - Bommel
8. Kingdom - Stalker Ha
9. Parental Control - Feel Like / Le K - Abraz
10. Alfabet (Awanto 3 & Tom Trago) - Lap The Music
11. Fantastic Man - Late At Night
12. Brandt Brauer Frick - Out Of Tash
13. Galaxy 2 Galaxy feat. Atlantis - Transition
14. Peverelist - Sun Dance
15. DJ Do Bass - To Catchy
16. French Fries - White Screen
17. Chico Mann - Soul Freedom
18. James Braun & Troels Abrahamsen - Wooden Knuckles
19. Glenn Astro - How I Miss You
20. Philogresz - Edge
21. Bok Bok & Tom Trago - Vector
22. Cosmin TRG - Echolab Disaster
23. MMM - Re-tics
24. Jam City - How We Relate To The Body
25. Brandt Brauer Frick - Hugo (DJ-Kicks)
26. Machinedrum - Now U Know Tha Deal 4 Real
27. Thundercat - Tenfold
28. Dean Blunt - Galice
