= Nothing Is Still =

Studio album by Leon Vynehall
- Released: 15 June 2018
- Length: 40:24
- Label: Ninja Tune
- Producer: Leon Vynehall

Leon Vynehall chronology
Nothing Is Still (2018)	Rare, Forever (2021)

Nothing Is Still is the debut full-length studio album by British DJ and record producer Leon Vynehall. It was released on 15 June 2018 via Ninja Tune.

== Critical reception ==
Professional ratings
Aggregate scores
Source	Rating
AnyDecentMusic?	7.6/10
Metacritic	82/100
Review scores
Source	Rating
AllMusic	3.5/5 stars
Clash	7/10
Exclaim!	8/10
Loud and Quiet	7/10
musicOMH	4/5 stars
NME	4/5 stars
Pitchfork	8.2/10
PopMatters	8/10
The Line of Best Fit	8.5/10
Under the Radar	6/10 stars

Nothing Is Still was met with universal acclaim from music critics. At Metacritic, which assigns a normalized rating out of 100 to reviews from mainstream publications, the album received an average score of 82 based on sixteen reviews. The aggregator AnyDecentMusic? has the critical consensus of the album at a 7.6 out of 10, based on nineteen reviews.

=== Accolades ===
Accolades for Nothing Is Still
Publication	Accolade	Rank	Ref.
Mixmag	The Top 50 Albums of 2018	19	
NME	NME's Albums Of The Year 2018	85	

== Track listing ==
All tracks are written by Leon Vynehall, except track 1 is written with Ralph Vaughan Williams.

No.	Title	Length
1.	"From the Sea/It Looms" (Chapters I & II)	6:20
2.	"Movements" (Chapter III)	3:51
3.	"Birds on the Tarmac" (Footnote III)	1:17
4.	"Julia" (Footnote IV)	2:25
5.	"Drinking It in Again" (Chapter IV)	3:46
6.	"Trouble, Pts. 1-3" (Chapter V)	5:42
7.	"Envelopes" (Chapter VI)	5:29
8.	"English Oak" (Chapter VII)	4:26
9.	"Ice Cream" (Chapter VIII)	4:50
10.	"It Breaks" (Chapter IX)	2:18
Total length:		40:24

Sample credits

- Track 1 contains elements from "The Lark Ascending" composed by Ralph Vaughan Williams.

== Personnel ==
- Leon Vynehall – producer, recording, engineering
- Ellie Stanford – violin (tracks: 1, 7–10)
- Jessie Murphy – violin (tracks: 1, 7–10)
- Marianne Haynes – violin (tracks: 1, 7–10)
- Paloma Deike – violin (tracks: 1, 7–10)
- Rosie Langley – violin (tracks: 1, 7–10)
- Stephanie Benedetti – violin (tracks: 1, 7–10)
- Amy Stanford – viola (tracks: 1, 7–10)
- Josephine Galton – viola (tracks: 1, 7–10)
- The Dirty Pretty Strings – strings (tracks: 1, 7–10)
- Jessica Cox – cello (tracks: 1, 7–10)
- Amy Langley – cello (tracks: 1, 7–9), strings arrangement (tracks: 1, 7–10)
- Finn Peters – saxophone (tracks: 1, 2, 5), flute (track 2)
- Sam Beste – piano (track 2)
- Blue May – mixing
- Josh Green – recording assistant
- Scott Knapper – mixing assistant
- Trevor Jackson – art direction, artwork
- Pol Bury – sleeve image
