= DJ-Kicks: The Black Album =

DJ-Kicks: Rockers Hi-Fi

Compilation album by Rockers Hi-Fi
- Released: 19 May 1997
- Genre: Electronica / Dub
- Length: 71:06
- Label: Studio !K7 !K7056LP (LP) !K7056CD (CD
- Producer: Rockers Hi-Fi

Rockers Hi-Fi chronology
Mish Mash (1997)	DJ-Kicks: Rockers Hi-Fi (1997)	Overproof (1998)

DJ-Kicks chronology
Nicolette (1997)	The Black Album (1997)	DJ Cam (1997)

Professional ratings
Review scores
Source	Rating
Allmusic	3/5 stars
NME	6/10

DJ-Kicks: Rockers Hi-Fi (also known as DJ-Kicks: The Black Album) is a DJ mix album, mixed by Rockers Hi-Fi. It was released on 19 May, 1997 on the Studio !K7 independent record label as part of the DJ-Kicks series.

The album was compiled and mixed by Rockers Hi-Fi, with additional vocals by MC Farda P.

Allmusic described the album as "a smart, thrilling ride into the minds and record collection of Rockers Hi-Fi", with an overall feel of "cinematic dub". M. Tye Comer, reviewing the album for CMJ New Music Monthly, described it as "an adventurous, entertaining, and mesmerizing record".

== Track listing ==
1. "Rockers Intro" - Farda P – 0:05
2. "Theme From Kung Fu" - Jeff Danna – 2:15
3. "He Builds The World" - Small Fish with Spine – 6:20
4. "Feel" - Kid Loops – 5:07
5. "Candles & Versions" - Wraparound Sounds – 4:04
6. "Up Through The Down Pipe" - DJ Grizzly – 4:02
7. "Dub Angel" - Snooze vs DJ Cam – 1:58
8. "Varispeed" - Electric J – 5:40
9. "Callacop" - Deep Space Network – 2:59
10. "Long Life" - Prince Far I And The Arabs – 4:38
11. "Com-unique-ation" - Cee-Mix – 6:34
12. "Never Tell You (featuring Tikiman) - Rhythm & Sound – 5:47
13. "Twisted System" (Ruts D.C. Dub) - Terminalhead & Mr. Spee – 4:42
14. "g13" - T Power – 0:51
15. "Saidisyabruklinmon" - Dr. Israel vs. Loop – 4:51
16. "Bad Head Day" (Subtropic Cut It Up mix) - Lida Husik – 4:55
17. "Dis Ya One" - More Rockers – 6:32
18. "Rockers Outro" - Farda P – 0:30
19. "The Black Single" (DJ-Kicks Rockers Hi-Fi mix) - Farda P – 4:06
