= DJ-Kicks: Playgroup =

Compilation album by Playgroup
- Released: 1 July 2002
- Recorded: ?
- Genre: Electronica
- Length: ?:?
- Labels: Studio !K7 !K7127CD
- Producer: Trevor Jackson

Playgroup chronology
Playgroup (2002)	DJ-Kicks: Playgroup (2002)	Reproduction (2004)

DJ-Kicks chronology
Vikter Duplaix (2002)	Playgroup (2002)	Tiga (2002)

Professional ratings
Review scores
Source	Rating
Allmusic	4/5 stars

DJ-Kicks: Playgroup is a DJ mix album, mixed by Playgroup, also known as Trevor Jackson. It was released on 1 July 2002 on the Studio !K7 independent record label as part of the DJ-Kicks series.

== Track listing ==
1. We (featuring Jimi Tenor) - Maurice Fulton Presents Boof
2. You're God (I:Cube remix) - Ana Rago
3. Ciquri (Discomix) - Material
4. Set It Off - Harlequin 4's / Bunker Kru
5. Tainted Love - Impedance
6. Broken Mirror - Random Factor
7. Ma Boom Bey (Love Chant version) - Cultural Vibe
8. Caught Up - Metro Area
9. The Sky Is Not Crying - Tiny Trendies
10. To Our Disco Friends - Smith N Hack
11. Tunnel Music - Zongamin
12. No Communication, No Love (Devastating) (Salt City Orchestra remix) - Charles Schillings
13. March Of General (Chicken Lips Conquest dub) - Nigo
14. Buggin' Becky (Tim 'Love' Lee Fully Beard mix) - J-Walk
15. Let's Get Jazzy (Dope Dub mix) - KC Flightt
16. Do Or Die (dub) - The Human League
17. Anti Social Tendencies - The Parallax Corporation
18. Behind The Wheel (DJ-Kicks Electroca$h Radio mix) - Playgroup
19. Get Up, Get Out - Ralphi Rosario
20. Still Hott 4 U - Bobby O
21. I Don't Care - Dexter
22. Gonna Make You Sweat (Acapella) - Wanda Dee
23. House Of Jealous Lovers - The Rapture
24. Money B - The Flying Lizards
