= Rockers Hi-Fi =

British band

- Origin: Birmingham, England
- Genres: Electronic
- Years active: 1991–1999
- Labels: The Cake Label, Different Drummer, 4th & Broadway, Gee Street, WEA

Rockers Hi-Fi were an electronic dub/dance group formed in Birmingham, England in 1991 as Original Rockers. In 1994, they changed their name to Rockers Hi-Fi. Their music was quite popular across Europe. The group consisted of MC Farda P, Glyn "Bigga" Bush, and Richard "DJ Dick" Whittingham. The group disbanded in 1999.

== Biography ==
Their first success came with a few tracks on the Beyond Records Ambient Dub series of compilations, and "Push Push" became a dancefloor hit in the beginning of the 1990s.

They released four studio albums and also mixed and compiled an album for Studio !K7's DJ-Kicks series.

In 1992, Whittingham and Glyn Bush founded the label Different Drummer, releasing music from both Original Rockers/Rockers Hi-Fi and others.

Their song "What a Life!" was part of the soundtrack for the 1995 film The Basketball Diaries, and "Going Under (Love & Insanity Dub) (K&D Sessions)" featured in the 2000 film Traffic, as well as in the mid-season finale to the first season of the television series The O.C.

=== After disbanding ===
Whittingham hosts Leftfoot at the Medicine Bar. In the 2000s, Bush produced music as BiggaBush (beats/electronic) and Lightning Head (dub/samba/latin/afrobeat) on his own Lion Head label.

== Style ==
Their urban sound was created by Whittingham who began his DJ career in Duran Duran's Rum Runner nightclub, and Bush. It was seen as an extension and continuation of the dub music.

== Discography ==
=== Original Rockers ===
- "Push Push" (single) (1991), The Cake Label
- Rockers to Rockers (released 1993 on Different Drummer, with four different tracks compared to the 1995 Rockers Hi-Fi re-release)

=== Rockers Hi-Fi ===
- Rockers to Rockers (recorded 1993, released 1995, 4th & Broadway / Gee Street Records)
- "Push Push" (single) (1995), 4th & Broadway
- Mish Mash (25 March 1997, WEA)
- "Going Under" (the Kruder & Dorfmeister Sessions EP) (single) 1997, Different Drummer / WEA
- DJ-Kicks: The Black Album (19 May 1997, Studio !K7)
- Overproof (1998, WEA)
- Times Up (1999, WEA)
