= DJ-Kicks: Annie =

Compilation album by Annie
- Released: 17 October 2005
- Genre: Electronic, house, nu-disco
- Length: 59:55
- Label: Studio !K7
- Producer: Annie, Ercola, Timo Kaukolampi

Annie chronology
Anniemal (2005)	DJ-Kicks: Annie (2005)	iTunes Live: London Festival '08 (2008)

DJ-Kicks chronology
The Glimmers (2005)	Annie (2005)	The Exclusives (2006)

Professional ratings
Review scores
Source	Rating
About.com	3.5/5 stars
Allmusic	3.5/5 stars
Exclaim!	positive
musicOMH	positive
Pitchfork Media	7.5/10
Stylus Magazine	B+

DJ-Kicks: Annie is a DJ mix album, mixed by Norwegian recording artist Annie. It was released on 17 October 2005 on the Studio !K7 independent record label as part of the DJ-Kicks series.

The previously unreleased track "Wedding" was offered as a free download prior to the album's release.

== Track listing ==
=== CD track listing ===
No.	Title	Writer(s)	Artist(s)	Length
1.	"Rabbit Pushing Mower"	Alisdair Stirling, Jørgen Træen	Toy	2:42
2.	"I Wanna Be Your Lover"	Angelo La Bionda, Carmelo La Bionda, R.W. Pamler-James	La Bionda	3:16
3.	"Jukebox Babe"	Alan Vega	Alan Vega	4:19
4.	"Nanny Nanny Boo Boo" (Junior Senior Remix)	JD Samson, Johanna Fateman, Kathleen Hanna	Le Tigre	3:24
5.	"Bongo Song"	S.I. Mukai	Zongamin	5:09
6.	"Flextone" (JD Twitch Optimo Edit)	Dennis Young, Salvatore Principato	Liquid Liquid	3:00
7.	"Wedding"	Anne L. B. Strand, Svein Berge, Torbjørn Brundtland	Annie	2:36
8.	"Black History Month" (Alan Braxe & Fred Falke Remix)	Jesse F. Keeler, Sebastien Grainger	Death from Above 1979	4:33
9.	"1939"	Antti Koivisto, Ercola, Timo Kaukolampi	Motiivi:Tuntematon	2:50
10.	"Geared Up" (featuring Annie)	Strand, Brundtland, Therson	Brundtland and Pehrson	3:47
11.	"Lady Bug (I Just Wanna Be Your)"	Greg Carmichael, Patrick Adams, Carmen Truss	Bumblebee Unlimited	5:12
12.	"Gimme Your Money"	Strand, Kaukolampi	Annie	2:59
13.	"I Want Candy"	Jerry Goldstein, Bob Feldman, Richard Gottehrer, Bert Berns	Bow Wow Wow	2:24
14.	"My Love for You"	Marie Scroggins, Renee Scroggins, Valerie Scroggins, Deborah Scroggins	ESG	2:45
15.	"Sally (That Girl)"	Cleveland Bell, Victor May	Gucci Crew II	2:28
16.	"Paris Hilton"	Mutsumi Kanamori	MU	3:21
17.	"Fa Fa Fa"	Fredrik Saroea, Ketil Mosnes	Datarock	5:10

Notes

- JD Twitch is misspelled as DJ Twitch on the CD inlay.

=== Vinyl track listing ===
Side One
No.	Title	Writer(s)	Artist(s)	Length
1.	"Gimme Your Money"	Strand, Kaukolampi	Annie	2:59
2.	"I Wanna Be Your Lover"	Angelo La Bionda, Carmelo La Bionda, R.W. Pamler-James	La Bionda	3:16
3.	"Jukebox Babe"	Alan Vega	Alan Vega	4:19

Side Two
No.	Title	Writer(s)	Artist(s)	Length
1.	"Bongo Song"	S.I. Mukai	Zongamin	5:09
2.	"Flextone" (JD Twitch Optimo Edit)	Dennis Young, Salvatore Principato	Liquid Liquid

Side Three
No.	Title	Writer(s)	Artist(s)	Length
1.	"Black History Month" (Alan Braxe & Fred Falke Remix)	Jesse F. Keeler, Sebastien Grainger	Death from Above 1979	4:33
2.	"Fa Fa Fa"	Fredrik Saroea, Ketil Mosnes	Datarock	5:10

Side Four
No.	Title	Writer(s)	Artist(s)	Length
1.	"Geared Up" (featuring Annie)	Strand, Brundtland, Therson	Brundtland and Pehrson	3:47
2.	"I Want Candy"	Jerry Goldstein, Bob Feldman, Richard Gottehrer, Bert Berns	Bow Wow Wow	2:24
3.	"Rabbit Pushing Mower"	Alisdair Stirling, Jørgen Træen	Toy	2:42

== Personnel ==
Credits adapted from DJ-Kicks: Annie album liner notes.

- Annie – vocals (7, 10, 12); producer (7, 12); compilation producer, DJ mix, selection
- Patrick Adams – producer (11)
- Svein Berge – producer (7)
- Alan Braxe – remix (8)
- Torbjørn Brundtland – producer (7)
- Jim Butler – notes
- Greg Carmichael – producer (11)
- Klaus Dahmen – art direction
- Lawrence Davis – producer (15)
- Mark Dodson – associate producer (13)
- Ercola – producer (9); DJ mix, editing
- Fred Falke – remix (8)
- Maurice Fulton – producer (16)
- Junior Senior – remix (4)
- Timo Kaukolampi – producer (9, 12); DJ mix, editing
- Paul Klein – producer (15)
- Antti Koivisto – producer (9)
- Kenny Laguna – producer (13)
- Le Tigre – producers (4)
- Steve Leeds – associate producer (13)
- Nicole Naumann – hair, make-up
- Yngve Sætre – producer (17)
- Charlus de la Salle – digital remastering (2)
- Nick Sansano – producer (4)
- Steviant – additional vocals (5)
- Alisdair Stirling – producer (1)
- Joseph Louis Stone – producer (15)
- Valerie Stahl von Stromberg – photography
- Will Sweeney – additional guitar (5)
- Jørgen Træen – producer (1)
- JD Twitch – editing (6)
