= DJ-Kicks: John Talabot =

Compilation album by John Talabot
- Released: November 11, 2013
- Genres: House; Electronic
- Label: Studio !K7
- Producer: John Talabot

John Talabot chronology
Fin (2012)	DJ-Kicks: John Talabot (2013)

Professional ratings
Aggregate scores
Source	Rating
Metacritic	77/100
Review scores
Source	Rating
Spin	8/10 stars
The Line of Best Fit	8/10 stars
Pitchfork	(7.9/10)
Resident Advisor	4.5/5 stars
Mondosonoro	4/5 stars

DJ-Kicks: John Talabot is a DJ mix album released on the Studio !K7 independent record label. Part of the DJ-Kicks series of mix compilations, it is the 46th installment of the series and was compiled and mixed by John Talabot.

== Track listing ==
1. North Lake – "Journey To The Center Of The Sun"
2. Pye Corner Audio – "Underneath The Dancefloor"
3. Maps – "I Heard Them Say (Andy Stott Remix)"
4. Pye Corner Audio – "Zero Centre"
5. Michael Ozone – "Hetrotopia (Young Marco Remix)"
6. Madteo – "We Doubt (You Can Make It)"
7. Harmonious Thelonious – "The Grasshopper Was The Witness (Elmore Judd & Rowan Park Remix)"
8. Tempel Rytmik – "Anagrama"
9. John Talabot – "Without You (DJ-Kicks)"
10. Axel Boman – "Klinsmann"
11. Joaquin Joe Claussell presents Residue Part One – "Eno (Melodic Dub)"
12. Bostro Pesopeo & Pional – "Bonus Beats"
13. Mara TK – "Run (Moodymann Remix)"
14. Alex Burkat – "Shower Scene"
15. Mistakes are Okay – "Night Watcher"
16. Unknown – "#001"
17. Round – "Glass"
18. Max Mohr – "Old Song"
19. Samo DJ – "Tai Po Kau"
20. Motor City Drum Ensemble – "Escape To Nowhere"
21. Paradise's Deep Groove – "Innermind"
22. Abby – "Streets (Wraetlic Remix)"
23. DJ Jus-Ed – "Turn Of The Century"
24. Genius of Time – "Juno Jam"
25. Kron – "Silikron (Jürgen Paape Remix)"
26. Talaboman – "Sideral"
27. Pional – "It's All Over (Locked Groove Rendition)"
