= Soulshine =

Studio album by DJ Cam
- Released: 2002
- Label: Inflammable

DJ Cam chronology
Honeymoon (2001)	Soulshine (2002)	Fillet of Soul (2003)

Soulshine is the fifth studio album by French DJ and recording artist DJ Cam, released in 2002.

Soulshine marks a departure from DJ Cam's regular sound, however the tracks still feature his trademark mix of hip-hop and jazz elements. As a whole, Soulshine is a cohesive collection of relaxed, lounge-type music. The jazzy, vibrant melodies (that incorporate for example flutes) are put on top of hard hitting, steady beats.

Soulshine features appearances from such American rappers as Afu-Ra and Gang Starr's Guru (credited as Baldheaded Slick). Keeping it real came with the help of Cameo. The album features some female vocalists: the light, jazzy opening track "Summer in Paris" features Indonesian singer/songwriter Anggun.

== Track listing ==
1. Summer in Paris (feat. Anggun)
2. Welcome To Soulshine
3. Love Junkie (feat. Cameo)
4. For Aaliyah
5. Condor (feat. Baldheaded Slick)
6. To Be Continued
7. Child's Play (feat. Filet of Soul)
8. The Snow
9. Bounce
10. Soulshine (feat. Inlove)
11. 3/4 Interlude
12. He's Gone (feat. China)
13. Afu Ra Interlude
14. Voodoo Child (feat. Afu Ra)
15. Elevation (feat. Donnie)

== Charts ==
Chart (2002)	Peak position
French Albums (SNEP)	114
