= DJ-Kicks: Daddy G =

Compilation album by Daddy G
- Released: 25 October 2004
- Recorded: n/a
- Genre: Trip hop, ragga
- Length: 71:04
- Label: Studio !K7 !K7170CD (CD) !K7170LP (LP)

DJ-Kicks chronology
| Erlend Øye (2004) | Daddy G (2004) | The Glimmers (2005) |

Professional ratings
Review scores
| Source | Rating |
|---|---|
| AllMusic | 4/5 stars |
| Resident Advisor | 4.0/5 |
| The Village Voice | B+ |

DJ-Kicks: Daddy G is a DJ mix album, mixed by Daddy G of the band Massive Attack. It was released on 25 October 2004 on the Studio !K7 independent record label as part of the DJ-Kicks series.

== Track listing ==
1. "Intro" – Philip Levi & Tippa Irie – 0:16
2. "Armagideon Time" – Willie Williams – 2:22
3. "Rockfort Rock" – Sound Dimension – 0:13
4. "Non Non Non" – Melaaz – 3:47
5. "Aftermath (Version 1)" (featuring Martina Topley-Bird) – Tricky – 5:36
6. "Just Kissed My Baby" – The Meters – 4:42
7. "Mustt Mustt" (Massive Attack remix) – Nusrat Fateh Ali Khan – 3:31
8. "Face A La Mer" (Massive Attack remix) – Les Negresses Vertes – 5:28
9. "Karmacoma" (The Napoli Trip) (featuring Almamegretta, remixed by Ben Young) – Massive Attack – 6:07
10. "Buddy Bye" – Johnny Osbourne – 4:22
11. "Signs" (Dubplate mix) – Badmarsh & Shri – 5:31
12. "Here I Come" (Dubplate version) – Barrington Levy – 3:47
13. "Oh Yeah" – Foxy Brown – 3:59
14. "Inspection (Check One)" – Leftfield – 6:27
15. "I Against I" – Massive Attack & Mos Def – 5:23
16. "Rock Steady" (Danny Krivit edit) – Aretha Franklin – 4:30
17. "Unfinished Sympathy" (Paul Oakenfold Perfecto mix) – Massive Attack – 5:27
