= DJ-Kicks: DJ Cam =

Compilation album by DJ Cam
- Released: 18 November 1997
- Recorded: n/a
- Genre: Trip hop, alternative hip hop, electronica, breakbeat
- Label: Studio !K7 !K7060CD (CD) !K7060LP (LP)

DJ-Kicks chronology
Rockers Hi-Fi (1997)	DJ Cam (1997)	Terranova (1998)

Professional ratings
Review scores
Source	Rating
Allmusic	3/5 stars

DJ-Kicks: DJ Cam is a DJ mix album, mixed by DJ Cam. It was released on 18 November 1997 on the Studio !K7 independent record label as part of the DJ-Kicks series.

== Track listing ==
1. "Dieu Reconnaitra Les Siens" - DJ Cam
2. "Zero G" - Minus 8
3. "Dark Jazz" (DJ Cam Remix) - Daphreephunkateerz
4. "Prelude to Cycle 6" - Part 2
5. "Tell the World" - Sci-Fi Select
6. "Ride Away" - The Mighty Bop
7. "Gettin' Down Again" - Tek 9
8. "Things in Time" - Rodney P
9. "Freestyle 1" - Awesome Two + Channel Live
10. "Unassisted" - Rasco
11. "Freestyle 2" - Awesome Two + Jem
12. "The Visitor" - Grand
13. "Juggling" - The Ragga Twins
14. "Milan" - Tommy Hools
15. "Bronx Theme" (DJ Kicks) - DJ Cam
