= DJ-Kicks: Terranova =

Compilation album by Terranova
- Released: 19 January 1998
- Genre: Electronic / Hip-hop / Breaks / Future Jazz
- Labels: Studio !K7, !K7064CD (CD)

DJ-Kicks chronology
DJ Cam (1997)	Terranova (1998)	DJ-Kicks: Smith & Mighty (1998)

Professional ratings
Review scores
Source	Rating
AllMusic	4/5 stars

DJ-Kicks: Terranova is a DJ mix album, mixed by Terranova. It was released on 19 January 1998 on the Studio !K7 independent record label as part of the DJ-Kicks series.

== Track listing ==
1. "Intro" - Terranova – 0:40
2. "Five Days" - Howie B (B., Bernstein) – 1:43
3. "Disorientation" - Priest (Blaize, Priest) – 3:53
4. "Sex, Sluts and Heaven" (Bordello mix) - Depth Charge (Kane) – 3:26
5. "Galactic Funk" - DJ Spooky (Paul D. Miller) – 4:20
6. "Tried by 12" - East Flatbush Project (Spencer Bellamy, Smith) – 2:41
7. "Run the Line" - Peanut Butter Wolf (Chris Manak) – 3:15
8. "Devil's Claw" - Ultimatum (Birch, Hallam) – 0:43
9. "Please Stand By" - BFC (Carl Craig) – 4:49
10. "City Lights (City of Starsigns)" - Patrick Pulsinger (Richard Dorfmeister, Patrick Pulsinger) – 2:54
11. "Ladies & Gentlemen" - 69 Jazzfunkclassics (Six Nine) – 10:42
12. "Definition of a Track" (The Backroom mix) - Backroom (Jenkins, Richardson) – 5:36
13. "Who Needs to Sleep Tonight" - Silicon Soul (Olgalyn Jolly, K. L. Schafer) – 0:05
14. "Modern Funk Beats" - The Octagon Man (Kane) – 1:16
15. "Tokyo Tower" (Avenue A remix)- Terranova (Göttsching, Terranova) – 5:09
16. "I L.O.V.E. You" - DSL (DJ DSL) – 2:43
17. "Stop It! Stop It! Stop It!" - Ultimatum (Birch, Hallam) – 1:04
18. "Jungle Brother" (Terranova mix) - Jungle Brothers (DJ Sammy B, Mike Gee, Hall, Jungle Brothers) – 4:56
19. "The Word" - Junkyard Band (Baker, Fergenbaum, Steve Harrison, Powell, Smith, Strong, Watkins) – 3:28
20. "Spoonie Rap" (Atmospheric version) - Spoonie Gee (Adams, Brown, Jackson) – 4:27
21. "Contact/DJ Kicks" - Terranova (Fetisch, Kaos, Meister) – 4:47

== Personnel ==
- Howie B – Performer
- BFC – Performer
- Depth Charge – Performer
- DJ Spooky – Performer
- East Flatbush Project – Performer
- Jungle Brothers – Performer
- Junkyard Band – Performer
- Ali Kepenek – Photography
- Octagon Man – Performer
- Patrick Pulsinger – Performer
- Marc Schilkowski – Design
- Silicon Soul – Performer
- Spoonie Gee – Performer
- Stereo MC's – Performer
