= DJ-Kicks: Vikter Duplaix =

Remix album by Various artists
- Released: January 28, 2002
- Label: Studio !K7

DJ-Kicks chronology
Trüby Trio (2001)	Vikter Duplaix (2002)	Playgroup (2002)

Professional ratings
Review scores
Source	Rating
Allmusic	4/5 stars

DJ Kicks: Vikter Duplaix is a DJ mix album, mixed by Vikter Duplaix. It was released on 28 January 2002 on the Studio !K7 independent record label as part of the DJ-Kicks series.

== Track listing ==
1. "The Beginning" - Critical Point - 3:22
2. "Together (Cry Tuff Original)" - Taurus - 1:56
3. "Hold It Down" - 4hero - 3:30
4. "The Crossing (Opaque Mix)" - P'taah - 2:46
5. "Feelin' Me Feelin' You" - Waiwan ft. Loretta Haywood - 4:06
6. "You Saw It All" - Herbert - 4:31
7. "Tree of Life" - Osunlade - 3:24
8. "Sensuality" - Vikter Duplaix - 6:08
9. "The Way" - Neppa Allstars - 3:19
10. "Happiness (Ashley Beedle's West Coast Mix)" - Shawn Lee - 2:53
11. "Berimbau (Bongo Re-Edit)" - Mandrake - 2:45
12. "Free as the Morning Sun" - Mr. Hermano - 4:34
13. "Welcome to the World" - Hopper ft. Carina Andersson - 5:43
14. "Transition" - Critical Point ft. Wadud - 1:08
15. "How Do I Move" - Spacek - 3:57
16. "Copa (Cabanga)" - De La Soul - 3:48
17. "Philadelphia" - Bahamadia - 2:46
18. "Bag Lady" - Erykah Badu - 3:23
19. "Holy Sounds" - Phillin Charles - 5:47
20. "The Sun" - New Sector Movements - 4:09
