= Vanishing Twin =

British psychedelic pop group

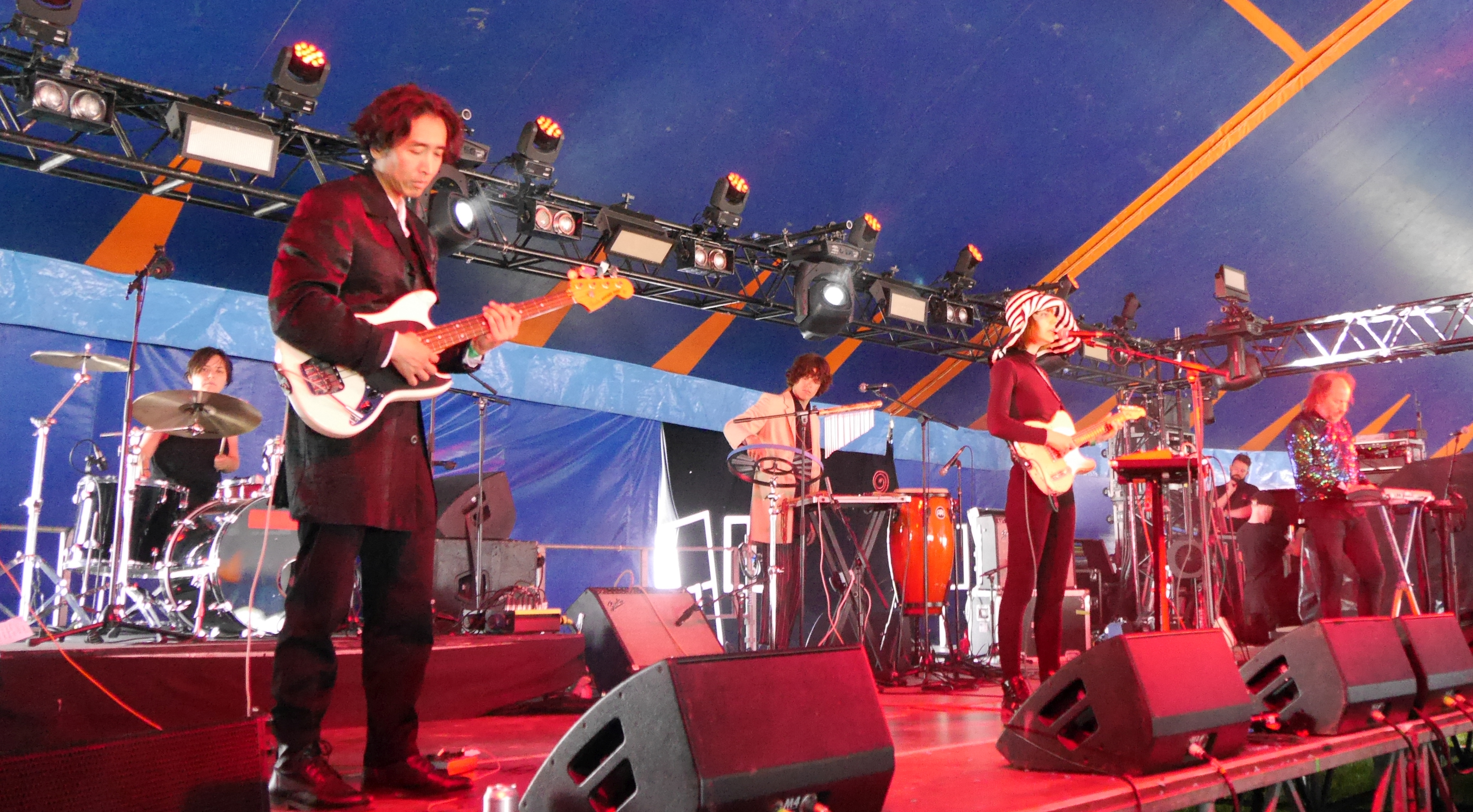
- Vanishing Twin, Glastonbury Festival, 2019

Background information
- Genre: Experimental
- Years active: 2015–present
- Labels: Soundway Records; Fire Records
- Members: Cathy Lucas; Valentina Magaletti; Susumu Mukai; Phil M.F.U.; Tony Blackburn
- Website: www.vanishingtwin.co.uk

Vanishing Twin are a London-based experimental trio, founded in 2015. The group is led by singer and guitarist Cathy Lucas, formerly a member of Fanfarlo, and have released five albums: Choose Your Own Adventure (2016), The Age of Immunology (2019), Ookii Gekkou (2021), Afternoon X (2023), and Archives (2026).

The band consists of Cathy Lucas on vocals, Valentina Magaletti on drums (whose credits include Bat for Lashes and Gruff Rhys’ Neon Neon project), and bassist Susumu Mukai (aka Zongamin). Lucas was previously a member of Fanfarlo. "The group’s cosmopolitan membership initially reflected its mission to synthesize psychedelic traditions around the globe, from tropicalía to kosmische rock." Their sound has been compared to the band Stereolab and is described as Brazilian psych-jazz as well as a psychedelic, experimental pop ensemble.

In 2016 their debut album, Choose Your Own Adventure, was released on Soundway Records. In 2017, they released the EP Dream By Numbers. Their second album, The Age of Immunology, was released in 2019 on Fire Records. Writing for Pitchfork, Stuart Berman gave the album a rating of 8/10, praising Lucas' vocals. On 15 October 2021, they released their third album, Ookii Gekkou, again on Fire Records. It was written and recorded during the COVID-19 lockdown. Their fourth album, Afternoon X, was released 6 October 2023 on Fire Records, receiving "universal acclaim" reviews from critics on Metacritic.. Their fifth album, Archives, was released on 2 October 2026, again on Fire Records.

== Discography ==
Albums

- Choose Your Own Adventure (2016)
- The Age of Immunology (2019)
- Ookii Gekkou (2021)
- Afternoon X (2023)
- Archives (2026)

EPs

- Dream by Numbers (2017)
- Between Magic & Machines (2018)
