= David Morley (musician) =

English actor and musician (born 1965)

David Morley (born 6 August 1965) is an English former child actor, most notably featured in Stanley Kubrick's Barry Lyndon.

David Morley was born in London on 6 August 1965. He now lives in Belgium, where he works as an electronic musician and producer. He was the in-house engineer for R&S Records in the 1980s and 1990s. He worked with DJ Andrea Parker for many years, co-writing and producing her album Kiss My Arp and many of her other releases.

He has released five of his own albums: Tilted, Ghosts, Sanctum, and The Origin of Storms. He has also released a live recording of his concert at the Fuse club in Belgium. He also works as a mastering engineer for electronic and ambient releases.
