= Fin (John Talabot album) =

Studio album by John Talabot
- Released: 14 February 2012
- Genres: House, electronic
- Length: 51:54
- Label: Permanent Vacation
- Producer: John Talabot

John Talabot chronology
Families (2011)	Fin (2012)	DJ-Kicks: John Talabot (2013)

Fin (stylized as ƒIN) is the debut studio album by Spanish electronic music producer John Talabot, released on 14 February 2012.

== Critical reception ==
Professional ratings
Aggregate scores
Source	Rating
AnyDecentMusic?	8.1/10
Metacritic	80/100
Review scores
Source	Rating
AllMusic	3/5 stars
Fact	4/5
Financial Times	4/5 stars
The Guardian	5/5 stars
The Irish Times	4/5 stars
Mojo	4/5 stars
Pitchfork	8.5/10
Q	3/5 stars
Resident Advisor	4.5/5
XLR8R	9/10

Upon its release, Fin received acclaim from music critics. At Metacritic, which assigns a normalized rating out of 100, the album has an average score of 80 out of 100, based on 20 reviews. Pitchfork awarded the album its "Best New Music" title. Fin was named the best album of 2012 on XLR8R's year-end list and placed third on year-end lists by Mixmag and Resident Advisor.

== Track listing ==
No.	Title	Length
1.	"Depak Ine"	7:26
2.	"Destiny" (featuring Pional)	4:53
3.	"El Oeste"	3:01
4.	"Oro Y Sangre"	4:53
5.	"Journeys" (featuring Ekhi)	4:05
6.	"Missing You"	4:02
7.	"Last Land"	4:23
8.	"Estiu"	3:05
9.	"When the Past Was Present"	5:06
10.	"H.O.R.S.E."	4:05
11.	"So Will Be Now..." (featuring Pional)	6:55
