= Music for the Uninvited =

EP by Leon Vynehall
- Released: 17 March 2014
- Recorded: 2013
- Genre: Deep house; downtempo
- Length: 39:20
- Label: 3024
- Producer: Leon Vynehall

Music for the Uninvited is an extended play by Brighton-based house producer Leon Vynehall. The EP is a seven-track set influenced from his experience listening to his mother's cassettes while being driven to school. It was released on the label 3024 in 2014 to a positive critical reception, ending up on numerous year-end lists in publications including Fact, Gorilla vs. Bear, NPR Music, Pitchfork Media, XLR8R and The Washington Post.

== Concept ==
The first music Leon Vynehall ever listened to was cassettes put together by his mother and her friends while he was driven to school. The cassettes consisted of old funk, early dance music and hip-hop, mainly from British musician, DJ and producer Aim. One of the tracks he remembered the most fondly of was called "Demonique", which included a snippet from the 1978 horror film Halloween, as well as many bells: "At the time thinking how the hell he got something from the movie onto a track while making it sound naturally part of the track, it baffled me. I wanted to record it to cassette, hearing the hiss. Tape has a really nice way of rounding off all the frequencies – there's a natural compression that I love, and I wanted to put it as part of a piece of work."

Vynehall discussed the title of Music for the Uninvited in a 2015 interview: "[It's] a nod to disco, as well as voguing and the origin of house music. I love the scene, and the whole idea of it. I'm trying my best to have the same feel as those sonic templates." He also hoped that listeners would not view the main idea of the record as "a by-product of something that's recently come about again" or about "oh, cassettes are cool again," people lazily branding it a hipster thing."

== Production and release ==
Leon Vynehall wrote, produced and engineered Music for the Uninvited. While the EP was released on 17 March 2014 on the label 3024, the EP had been finished long before then, but Vynehall said that he had "been purposefully trying not to tinker with it, just affording it breathing space."

== Track information ==
"Inside the Deku Tree" opens Music for the Uninvited. As implied in the title, the song's contains an atmosphere when someone walks into the Great Deku Tree from the Nintendo 64 The Legend of Zelda: Ocarina of Time. The first song written for Music for the Uninvited was the second track, "Goodthing", which he started in October 2012. "Be Brave, Clench Fists" has muted strings, dub-like synths and restrained percussion in its instrumentation, and Resident Advisor's Stephen Worthy found it similar to Pépé Bradock's song "Deep Burnt".

== Critical reception ==
Professional ratings
Review scores
Source	Rating
Allmusic	4/5 stars
Resident Advisor	4.5/5

=== Release and reviews ===
Music for the Uninvited garnered acclaim from music critics. Resident Advisor's Stephen Worthy scored the EP a 4.5 out of five, calling it "one of the most eclectic and rewarding house records you'll hear all year." Allmusic journalist Paul Simpson described the release as "joyous and exciting", and "undoubtedly one of 2014's most triumphant house records." Felicity Martin of Clash wrote that, "If this is what being uninvited is like, we're totally cool with missing the party", while Chris Richards said in his review for The Washington Post that it "couldn't be much more of a delight."

=== Accolades ===
Halfway into 2014, Music for the Uninvited was included on NPR Music's "25 Favorite Albums Of 2014 (So Far)", with Otis Hart calling it an "old-school labor of love by one of the most promising young minds in dance music, nostalgic and next-level at the same time." It was also on Pitchfork Media's staff list of overlooked records of 2014, with Patric Fallon writing that "it's unlikely that you'll find a more tuneful and invigorating dancefloor album released this year."

Music for the Uninvited was also on several year-end lists. When it was listed number three on XLR8R's best releases of that year, Chris Kokiousis opined that Vynehall bravely made an artistic statement with the record, which is what other producers have failed to do. It was one of The Skinny's "Best Dance 12"s of 2014", with Daniel Jones honoring the track "Inside the Deku Tree" as possibly "the best opener of the year". Pitchfork ranked the release number 41 on their "Top 50 Best Albums of 2014", and the song "Goodthing" was in the 64th place of their "100 Best Tracks" list. The Washington Post and Fact put it at number 31 on their top 50 lists, while on Gorilla vs. Bear's year-end list, it came in at number 15. Regarding genre-specific lists, NPR Music put the EP at number five on their top ten electronic albums of the year.

== Track listing ==
No.	Title	Length
1.	"Inside the Deku Tree"	4:00
2.	"Goodthing"	6:24
3.	"Be Brave, Clench Fists"	6:45
4.	"Pier Children"	6:15
5.	"It's Just (House of Dupree)"	8:45
6.	"Christ Air"	3:19
7.	"St. Sinclair"	3:52
Total length:		39:20
