= DJ-Kicks: Leon Vynehall =

Compilation album by Leon Vynehall
- Released: 8 February 2019
- Length: 1:17:40
- Label: Studio !K7

Leon Vynehall chronology
Envelopes (2018)	DJ-Kicks: Leon Vynehall (2019)

DJ-Kicks chronology
DJ-Kicks: Robert Hood (2018)	DJ-Kicks: Leon Vynehall (2019)	DJ-Kicks: Laurel Halo (2019)

Professional ratings
Aggregate scores
Source	Rating
Metacritic	74/100
Review scores
Source	Rating
AllMusic	4/5 stars
Pitchfork	6.9/10
PopMatters	6/10

DJ-Kicks: Leon Vynehall is a DJ mix album, mixed by British DJ and producer Leon Vynehall. It was released in February 2019 under the Studio !K7 independent record label as part of their DJ-Kicks series.

== Track listing ==
No.	Title	Music	Length
1.	"Who Loved Before"	Leon Vynehall	1:51
2.	"Genie" (featuring Kemikal)	Itumo Carty, Jordan Chung	2:01
3.	"Giant Bitmap" (featuring Tomaga)	Valentina Magaletti, Tom Relleen	2:17
4.	"Loopy" (featuring De Fabriek)	De Fabriek	0:42
5.	"Rose & Beast" (featuring Haruomi Hosono)	Haruomi Hosono	3:01
6.	"Force To" (featuring dgoHn)	John Cunnane	3:04
7.	"Set Me Free" (featuring The Bygraves)	Beverley Bygraves, Trevor Bygraves	4:21
8.	"August Is an Angel" (featuring Martin Chartrand, David Curtis, Degrees of Freedom, Cadman Janet)	David Curtis	3:40
9.	"Over and Under" (featuring Ellen Fullman)	Ellen Fullman	0:41
10.	"Moving Forward" (featuring Bourbonese Qualk)	Simon Crab	4:16
11.	"Nuws" (featuring Shamos)	Shamos	2:37
12.	"Sex & the Married Frog" (featuring Dave Ball, Genesis P-Orridge)	Dave Ball, Genesis P-Orridge	3:04
13.	"Full Slice" (featuring Run Dust)	Luke Calzonetti	1:44
14.	"Mellow Vibe" (featuring DJ Zozi)	DJ Zozi	3:06
15.	"Fushigi" (featuring RAC)	Chris Duckenfield	2:17
16.	"Lapis Lazuli B2" (featuring Primitive)	Richard Brown, Chris Duckenfield	2:32
17.	"Kilimanjaro" (featuring Crinan)	Christian Topac	4:58
18.	"Pressure" (featuring Ploy)	Samuel Smith	2:58
19.	"Ducee's Drawbar (DJ-Kicks)"	Leon Vynehall	2:04
20.	"Happy Track" (tfeaturing Pavilion)	Pavilion	3:02
21.	"Faxing Jupiter" (featuring Peach)	Peach	3:29
22.	"Unsung Hero of Irrelevance" (featuring Etch)	Zak Brashill	4:36
23.	"Deep Rage" (featuring Mirage)	Ginger Baker	4:41
24.	"Children Talking" (featuring Aphex Twin)	Richard D. James	4:03
25.	"Divine" (featuring Jana Rush)	Jana Rush	2:59
26.	"Music for Piano" (featuring Robert Haigh)	Robert Haigh	3:08

== Charts ==
Chart	Peak position
UK Dance Albums (OCC)	18
