= Medicine Bar =

Former bar in Birmingham, England

Coordinates: 52°28′31″N 1°53′3″W

The Medicine Bar was a bar in Birmingham, England. Located in the Custard Factory in Digbeth, it hosted many techno, acid jazz, funk and hip hop events. It started as a collaboration in the 1990s between the London Medicine bar and local hip hop DJ 'Simon Fat Head', who began his career at the Brothers and Sisters at the Coast to Coast club on Broad Street. It ceased to trade by 2012.

Substance (which evolved out of Amplified) was the longest running hip hop night in the bar, with DJs Roc1, Magoo, Chris Reid (also from Scratch in London) and MC Mad Flow. It brought hip hop acts including Afrika Bambaata, De La Soul and Jeru the Damaja to Birmingham.

Leftfoot was the bar's main funk and soul night which was in part run by ex Rockers Hi-Fi DJ Dick and Adam Regan (who now owns the Bull's Head bar in the birmingham suburb of Moseley). Leftfoot hosted many large acid Jazz type events with appearances from Gilles Peterson to Mr Scruff. Both nights featured live acts.

Other events to have take place at the bar included breakdance and graffiti art shows. For a short period in 2006/07, the Medicine Bar hosted the Birmingham leg of Club NME.

Medicine Bar had a Martin Audio modular system installed by Ace Vintage Systems.
