= DJ-Kicks: Andrea Parker =

Compilation album by Andrea Parker
- Released: August 31, 1998
- Label: Studio !K7

DJ-Kicks chronology
Smith & Mighty (1998)	Andrea Parker (1998)	Kemistry & Storm (1999)

Professional ratings
Review scores
Source	Rating
Allmusic	4/5 stars

DJ-Kicks: Andrea Parker is a DJ mix album, mixed by Andrea Parker. Mixing and scratching was also provided by Jamie Bissmire of Space DJ'z. It was released on 31 August 1998 on the Studio !K7 independent record label as part of the DJ-Kicks series.

== Track listing ==
1. "It's No Good (Andrea Parker Mix)" – Depeche Mode – 4:41
2. "Earth People (Earth Planet Mix)" – Dr. Octagon – 4:12
3. "Free Your Mind" – Piece – 3:14
4. "Psycodelico" – Reminiscence Quartet – 4:36
5. "Desire" – 69 – 4:39
6. "Hip Hop Be Bop (Don't Stop)" – Man Parrish – 3:02
7. "Puzl" – Gescom – 3:08
8. "G String Remix (Andrea Parker)" – G-File – 1:57
9. "In the Bottle" – C.O.D. – 4:20
10. "Too Good to Be Strange" – Two Sandwiches Short of a Lunchbox – 4:05
11. "The Phantom (It's In There)" – Renegade Soundwave – 1:34
12. "Renegades Chant" – Afrika Bambaata and the Soulsonic Force – 5:13
13. "Da Tunnelz" – Sons of the Subway – 2:32
14. "Celestial Funk" – Space DJ'z – 4:39
15. "Night Drive" – Model 500 – 3:09
16. "Cellularphone" – Dopplereffekt – 2:50
17. "Vision of Mars" – DJ Panic – 2:40
18. "Asphalt" – Voigt Kampff – 2:48
19. "Hydro Theory" – Drexciya – 3:59
20. "Unconnected" – Andrea Parker – 7:48
