= Percolate (clubbing brand) =

Percolate is a clubbing brand based in London, England. Founded in 2012, it is best known for Electronic Music events, specifically House, Disco and Techno. Founded by Fred Letts and Ed Lo Bianco, and now run by Letts and Simon Denby, Percolate is famously nomadic, utilising different venues across the capital for each edition. Events began at the 250 capacity Brixton venue AIRspace, and have since taken in many of London's premier underground music venues including Village Underground, Shapes, Oval Space, Corsica Studios and the 3000 capacity Studio 338.

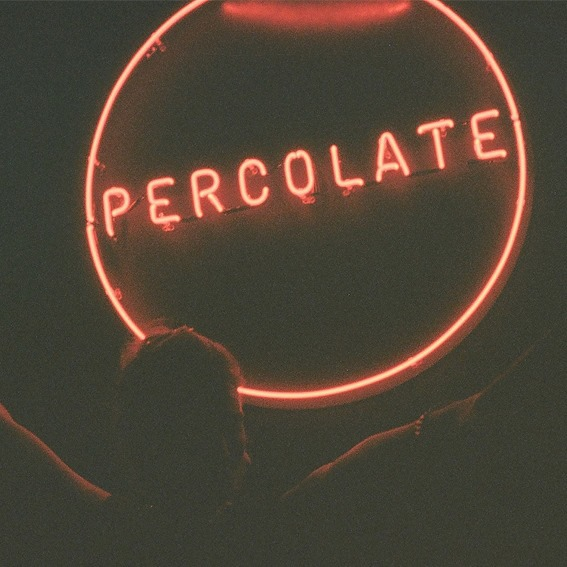
Photograph from an early event

Notable festival appearances include Gottwood, Love International (formerly Garden Festival) & Lovebox Festival. Percolate's 2016 Spring Series also included events in Manchester & Amsterdam. In addition, a collaboration with Ibiza's Zoo Project will see shows in Barcelona during Sonar week and a September Ibiza date.

== Notable Past Acts ==
- Bicep
- Bonobo
- Floating Points
- Gerd Janson
- Jeremy Underground
- Leon Vynehall
- Midland
- Mount Kimbie
- Moodymann
