= DJ-Kicks: Four Tet =

Compilation album by Four Tet
- Released: 26 June 2006
- Genre: Jazz / Electronica
- Label: Studio !K7

Four Tet chronology
The Exchange Session Vol. 2 (2006)	DJ-Kicks: Four Tet (2006)

DJ-Kicks chronology
The Exclusives (2006)	Four Tet (2006)	Henrik Schwarz (2006)

Professional ratings
Review scores
Source	Rating
Allmusic	4/5 stars

DJ-Kicks: Four Tet is a DJ mix album released on the Studio !K7 independent record label. Part of the DJ-Kicks series of mix compilations, it is the 27th installment of the series and was compiled and mixed by Four Tet.

== Track listing ==
1. David Behrman - "Leapday Night (Scene 1)"
2. Syclops - "Mom, the Video Broke"
3. Curtis Mayfield - "If I Were Only a Child Again"
4. Heiner Stadler - "Out-Rock"
5. Gary Davis - "The Professor's Here"
6. Heldon - "Les soucoupes volantes vertes"
7. Stereolab - "Les Yper-Sound"
8. So Solid Crew - "Dilemma"
9. Akufen - "Psychometry 3.2"
10. Animal Collective - "Baby Day"
11. Madvillain - "Figaro (101 Remix)"
12. Julian Priester + Pepo Mtoto - "Love, Love"
13. Four Tet - "Pockets"
14. Model 500 - "Psychosomatic"
15. Shona People of Rhodesia - "Taireva"
16. Quickspace Supersport - "Superspace"
17. Cabaret Voltaire - "Kneel to the Boss"
18. Gong - "Love Is How Y Make It"
19. Showbiz & AG - "Represent"
20. Group Home - "Up Against the Wall (Getaway Car Mix)"
21. Autechre - "Flutter"
