= Afternoon X =

Studio album by Vanishing Twin
- Released: 6 October 2023
- Length: 37:35
- Label: Fire

Vanishing Twin chronology
Ookii Gekkou (2021)	Afternoon X (2023)

Afternoon X is the fourth studio album by English band Vanishing Twin. It was released 6 October 2023 by Fire Records.

== Critical reception ==
Professional ratings
Aggregate scores
Source	Rating
Metacritic	81/100
Review scores
Source	Rating
AllMusic	4/5 stars
Pitchfork	7.2/10
PopMatters	7/10

Afternoon X was met with "universal acclaim" reviews from critics. At Metacritic, which assigns a weighted average rating out of 100 to reviews from mainstream publications, this release received an average score of 81, based on 7 reviews.

At Pitchfork, writer Maria Eberhart said: "Afternoon X embodies a lively sense of exploratory wonder. Drawing from a deep catalog of inspirations, Vanishing Twin have long made music for sharp-eared listeners. But with this album's unpredictable forms, the trio moves confidently beyond its acuity for cultural synthesis."

== Track listing ==
Afternoon X track listing
No.	Title	Length
1.	"Melty"	2:10
2.	"Afternoon X"	4:06
3.	"Brain Weather"	2:53
4.	"Lotus Eater"	4:23
5.	"Marbles"	6:17
6.	"The Down Below"	8:23
7.	"Lazy Garden"	4:56
8.	"Subito"	4:27

== Charts ==
Chart performance for Afternoon X
Chart (2023)	Peak position
Scottish Albums (OCC)	63
UK Independent Albums (OCC)	22
