= DJ-Kicks: The Glimmers =

Compilation album by Various artists
- Released: April 11, 2005
- Label: Studio !K7

DJ-Kicks chronology
Daddy G (2004)	The Glimmers (2005)	Annie (2005)

Professional ratings
Review scores
Source	Rating
Allmusic	3.5/5 stars

DJ Kicks: The Glimmers is a DJ mix album, mixed by The Glimmers (formerly The Glimmer Twins and Mo & Benoelie). It was released on 11 April 2005 on the Studio !K7 independent record label as part of the DJ-Kicks series.

== Track listing ==
1. "Shack Up" – bis – 3:23
2. "Lovertits" – Peaches – 2:52
3. "Approach & Pass With Contact" – Big Two Hundred – 4:16
4. "I Want U (Dub)" – Dirty Mind – 4:06
5. "Heroine (DJ Kicks Mix)" – The Lotterboys – 3:32
6. "Can You Move" – Modern Romance – 3:09
7. "Disko Satisfaction" – Kerri Chandler – 3:25
8. "Get Down" – Connie Case – 3:20
9. "Everybody Get Down" – Deepstate II – 3:50
10. "Fix It Man (Marshall Jefferson Vocal Mix)" – Ragtyme – 2:32
11. "Kosmisk Klubbveld" – Lindstrøm & Prins Thomas – 3:50
12. "Feel Like I Feel (Sing Along)" – Kaos – 6:02
13. "Impi (Dub)" – Impi – 3:16
14. "The Groove Machine / The Boogie Train" – Hamilton Bohannon – 4:27
15. "Cassette (DJ Kicks) – The Glimmers – 5:39
16. "Feast Dub" – Two Lone Swordsmen – 3:48
17. "Kel's Vintage Thought (Out Hud Rmx)" – Magnetophone – 3:10
18. "I'm A Man" – Chicago – 7:49
