= DJ-Kicks: Henrik Schwarz =

Compilation album by Henrik Schwarz
- Released: 27 September 2006
- Genre: Electronic
- Label: Studio !K7
- Producer: Henrik Schwarz

DJ-Kicks chronology
Four Tet (2006)	Henrik Schwarz (2006)	Hot Chip (2007)

Professional ratings
Review scores
Source	Rating
Allmusic	4.5/5 stars
Resident Advisor	4.5/5 stars

DJ-Kicks: Henrik Schwarz is a DJ mix album mixed by German producer Henrik Schwarz. It was released on the !K7 independent record label as part of the DJ-Kicks series.

== Track listing ==
1. "Intro" – Henrik Schwarz – 0:44
2. "Bird's Lament" – Moondog – 2:38
3. "Woman of the World" – Double – 3:09
4. "Claire" – iiO – 3:15
5. "Spanish Joint" – D'Angelo – 4:11
6. "Since You've Been Gone" – James Brown – 2:18
7. "Jon (Live Version)" – Henrik Schwarz – 4:47
8. "Let It Out" – Jae Mason – 2:31
9. "Anthracite" – Cymande – 3:17
10. "Imagination Limitation (DJ-KiCKS)" – Henrik Schwarz – 6:12
11. "Black Sea" – Drexciya – 3:43
12. "Giya Kasiamore" – Amampondo – 2:15
13. "Walk a Mile in My Shoes (Henrik Schwarz Remix)" – Coldcut ft. Robert Owens – 7:50
14. "The Core" – Robert Hood – 0:31
15. "Chant Avec Cithare" – artist unknown – 1:12
16. "Summun Bukmun Umyun" – Pharoah Sanders – 3:30
17. "You Can Be a Star" – Luther Davis Group – 4:30
18. "Get Around to It" – Arthur Russell – 4:05
19. "Conscious of My Conscience" – Womack & Womack – 5:16
20. "Let Jah Love Come" – Rhythm & Sound, Sugar Minott – 3:37
21. "Wake Up Brothers" – Doug Hammond – 3:07
22. "You're the Man (Alternate Version 2)" – Marvin Gaye – 3:55
23. "Outro" – Henrik Schwarz – 1:12

== Audio links ==
- RBMA Radio on Demand – Train Wreck Mix – Henrik Schwarz (Sunday-Music, Berlin)
