= Andrea Parker (musician) =

British electronic music producer

- Origin: Kent, England
- Genres: Electro, trip hop, downtempo
- Occupations: Musician, songwriter, remixer, DJ
- Years active: 1993–present
- Labels: Mo' Wax, Touchin' Bass, Aperture
- Formerly of: Inky Blacknuss

Andrea Parker is a British electronic music producer, record label proprietor and DJ from Pembury, Kent, England.

== Biography ==
Despite having a background in cello playing, Parker was influenced by electronic pioneers such as Art Of Noise and Jean Michel Jarre. She formed the group Inky Blacknuss with producers Alex Knight and Ian Tregoning in 1993 for Andrew Weatherall's Sabrettes label, before signing to hip hop label Mo' Wax for her solo output, releasing her debut album Kiss My Arp (a reference to the vintage ARP synthesisers) in 1999. Kiss My Arp peaked at No. 73 on the CMJ Radio 200 and No. 2 on the CMJ RPM Chart in the U.S. Electronic music producer David Morley was an important part of her musical output as co-writer and almost all her studio work took place in his studio, which was then in Germany.

In 2002, Parker formed the Touchin' Bass imprint after splitting from Mo' Wax, citing problems with the label's management merger, and the subsequent hold up in releasing any of her further projects. With her long-time production partner David Morley, her output became rooted in a darker, less organic sound than her work with Mo' Wax. Her output referenced classic electro music from the 1980s, relying heavily on the use of drum machines such as the Roland TR-808, as well as electro's ghettotech connection by collaborating with DJ Assault and DJ Godfather on her Freaky Bitches 12".

A retrospective called Here's One I Made Earlier… (a reference to the British television show Blue Peter) was released in 2007.

== Discography ==
- Angular Art (Infonet, 1995)
- Melodious Thunk (Mo' Wax, 1996)
- The Rocking Chair (Mo' Wax, 1996)
- Ballbreaker / Some Other Level (Mo' Wax, 1998)
- DJ-Kicks: Andrea Parker (!K7 Records, 1998)
- Kiss My Arp album (Mo' Wax, 1999)
- The Unknown (Mo' Wax, 1999)
- The Dark Ages (Quatermass, 2001)
- Freaky Bitches (Touchin' Bass, 2002)
- Game Over (Touchin' Bass, 2003)
- Here's One I Made Earlier… (Touchin' Bass, 2007)
- Private Dreams and Public Nightmares (Aperture Records, 2011)
