= Brandt Brauer Frick =

German musical group

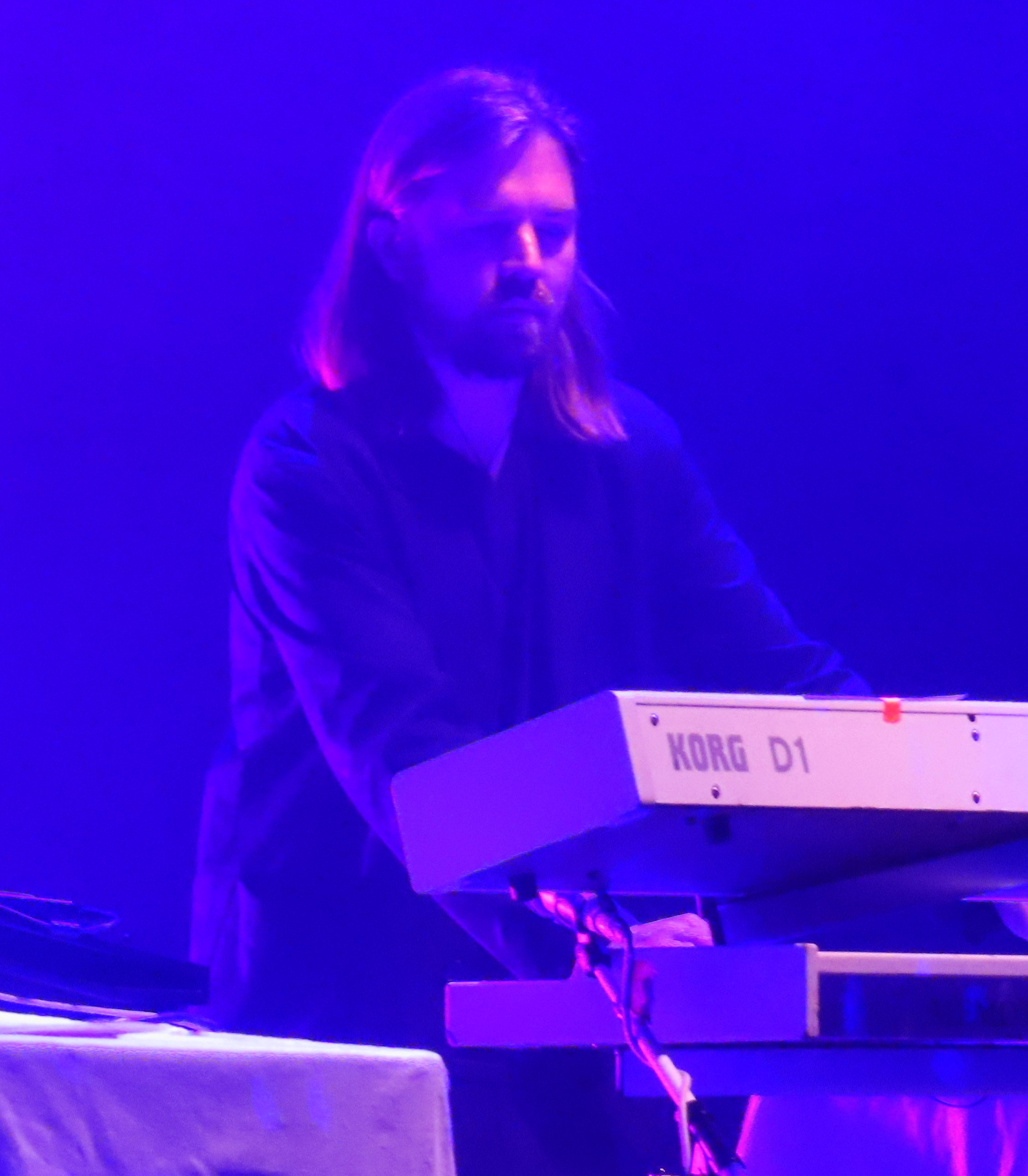
Paul Frick with Tangerine Dream in 2024

Brandt Brauer Frick is a German electronic music ensemble from Berlin. The group's members are Daniel Brandt, Jan Brauer, and Paul Frick.

The group's members are classically trained and began performing together in 2009. The Guardian described them as a group composing "austere sonic experiments, from engineering complex minimalist techno to replicating the DNA of dance music using orchestral instruments." Their 2013 release Miami involved production work and guest vocals from Om'Mas Keith.

The group has made appearances at festivals such as Coachella, Glastonbury, and Haldern Pop.

Paul Frick is now working as an official member of Tangerine Dream as of June 9, 2020.

== History ==
The group was founded in Wiesbaden in 2008. The approach was to unite repetitive and grooving formulas of electronic dance music with the sound world of new classical music. For this purpose, instrumental parts of classical musical instruments were recorded and electronically processed as samples. The band had their first appearance at the C3 Festival in the Berlin techno club Berghain. Electronic drums, keyboard and groovebox served as instruments here. With the change to the music label !K7, new musicians were added and the music was also performed live under the name Brandt Brauer Frick Ensemble.

In 2014 Brandt Brauer Frick collaborated with the 40-piece WDR choir for a one-off performance in Cologne. Their ensemble expanded to a 90-piece orchestra for performances with Filarmónica Mexiquense at Mutek Festival in Mexico City (2018) and with El Sistema Symphony Orchestra in Caracas (2020). In 2016, Brandt Brauer Frick joined British director and choreographer Martin Butler to write and perform the opera "Gianni," which premiered at Deutsche Oper in Berlin the same year.

Brandt Brauer Frick's fifth studio album was released in 2019 on French label Because Music.

The accompanying interactive video "Masse", co-directed by Daniel won the Bloom Award for Best Music Video at Art Dusseldorf 2019.

Their first video "Bop" quickly reached half a million plays after it came out in 2009 after Kanye West posted it on his now defunct blog, the video was also a film festival success, being nominated for best video at London Independent Film Festival 2010, Chicago International Movies And Music Festival 2010, European Media Art Festival, Osnabrück 2010 and won Golden Palm For Best Music Video at Mexico International Film Festival, Rising Star Award For Excellence In Filmmaking at Canada International Film Festival 2010 and the Silver Ace Award at Las Vegas Film Festival 2010.

Daniel released two solo records with London based label Erased Tapes in 2017 and 2018 respectively and toured with a three piece band consisting of Pascal bideau (Akusmi) and Florian Juncker who is also part of the BBF Ensemble playing at venues and festivals like Barbican hall London, Wonderfruit Festival Thailand, Haldern Pop, SXSW

Besides their main output, the band has quite regularly remixed or reinterpreted other artists music, such as José González, Yasmine Hamdan, Hundred Waters, Fink, Rocko Schamoni and many more.

== Discography ==
=== Studio albums ===
- You Make Me Real (!K7, 2010)
- Mr. Machine (!K7, 2011)
- Miami (!K7, 2013)
- Joy (Because Music, 2016)
- Echo (Because Music, 2019)
- Multi Faith Prayer Room (Because Music, 2023)

=== Compilations ===
- DJ-Kicks: Brandt Brauer Frick (!K7, 2014)

=== Singles and EPs ===
- Corky (Tartelet, 2011)
- Bop (Tartelet, 2010)
- Iron Man (Tartelet, 2009)
- Wallah (The Gym, 2009)

== Awards and nominations ==
| Award Ceremony | Year | Category | Work | Result |
|---|---|---|---|---|
| Berlin Music Video Awards | 2023 | Best Experimental | Act One | Nominated |
