= Leftfoot =

Leftfoot is a musical event. It was launched by Adam Regan, collaborating with DJ Dick (Richard Whittingham) in 2000 in Birmingham's Medicine Bar.

Primarily an acid jazz night, many other major music styles such as hip hop, funk and dub are included.

Leftfoot has featured on BBC Radio 1 several times and at other events such as the Cheltenham International Jazz Festival.

Acts that have performed for Leftfoot include Gilles Peterson, Mr Scruff, DJ Patife, Cleveland Watkiss, Keb Darge, Roots Manuva, Bonobo and Ninja Tune records.
