= Henrik Schwarz =

German music producer (born 1972)

- Born: 31 May 1972 (age 54); Bergatreute, West Germany
- Genres: Deep house; classical crossover
- Occupation: Musician
- Website: henrikschwarz.com

Henrik Schwarz (born 31 May 1972) is a German deep house and classical crossover producer and DJ from Bodensee, whose career began in the early 1990s. He has remixed music for numerous musicians, including Coldplay, Mary J. Blige, and Foals. In 2017, he worked with songwriter/producer Jarrah McCleary (Panama).

== Music career ==
Since 2002, Schwarz has worked on over 100 musical projects, and in 2006, he mixed the compilation album DJ-Kicks: Henrik Schwarz. In 2007, he released Henrik Schwarz Live, which documented his shift from DJing to being a live laptop performer. Schwarz has partnered with !K7 to launch a new label, Between Buttons. Focusing on acoustic sounds and contemporary classical music, the label's first release was an EP from Schwarz himself, titled Works Piano, followed by an EP titled Aphorisms, by Syrian artists Khaled Kurbeh & Raman Khalaf Ensemble.

== Selected discography ==
- DJ-Kicks: Henrik Schwarz (2006)
- Henrik Schwarz Live (2007)
- Bugge Wesseltoft & Henrik Schwarz – Duo (2011)
- Bugge Wesseltoft, Henrik Schwarz, Dan Berglund – Trialogue (2014)
- Instruments (2015)
- Works Piano (2017)
- Henrik Schwarz & Metropole Orkest – Scripted Orkestra (7k!, 2018)
- Henrik Schwarz & Alma Quartet – CCMYK (2019)
- Bugge Wesseltoft & Henrik Schwarz – Duo II (2022)
