= Terranova (band) =

German band

Terranova is a German band based between Berlin and Paris made up of current members Fetisch and &me. Terranova are signed to Kompakt records. Terranova was formed in 1996 by Fetisch, Marco Meister and Kaos. They previously went under the moniker Turntable Terranova on the Compost label and sometimes as Edition Terranova. Their music is a fusion of punk rock, electronic, hip-hop and House. They currently reside between Paris and Berlin and perform DJ sets worldwide. They have been constant collaborators with artists in the past, Cath Coffey, Nicolette Krebitz, Tricky, Ari Up, Mike Ladd, Khan, Snax, Billie Ray Martin e.a.

== History ==
Terranova began after previous member Shapemod left Los Angeles from studying guitar to Berlin where he met Fetisch at the Pogo Club when they began producing together. Their first release, in 1996, was a 12" record entitled "Fiasko". The "Antimatter EP" was also released the same year. It wasn't until 1997 when they released the 12" record "Tokyo Tower" that brought Terranova into the British press. On 19 January 1998, Terranova released their take on DJ mix album, DJ-Kicks which gained them further recognition and is regarded as one of the best and most loved in the highly respected series. Remixes for Fanatik, Jungle Brothers and Stereo MCs followed soon after, among many others. In 1999 Terranova released the singles "Turn Around" feat. Cath Coffey and "Just Enough" feat. Nicolette Krebitz. Photographer Juergen Teller made his first foray into film direction for the band's accompanying video for the track "Just Enough". Terranova released their debut LP Close the Door in the same year with Copasetik. Close the Door featured guest vocals from Stereo MCs member, Cath Coffey on tracks "Turn Around", "Midnight Melodic (Chase the Blues)" and "Sweet Bitter Love". From the same label Rasco featured on tracks "X-Files" and "Midnight Melodic". Bristol artist Tricky appeared on "Bombing Bastards". And Nicolette Krebitz sang on "Never," "Plastic Stress," and "Just Enough". She also features on the cover and in the sleeve of the same album.

Terranova left their Copasetik label to join !K7 Records (the same label DJ Kicks albums are released). They remained on this label and released their second LP Hitchhiking Nonstop with no Particular Destination in 2002. Cath Coffey returned for tracks "Out of My Head" and "Breathe." Mike Ladd raps on "Sublime" and "Heroes." And Ari Up of The Slits appears on "Mongril" and "Equal Rights". Soon after they released Peace Is Tough, a companion album for Hitchhiking Nonstop with no Particular Destination by remixing five new tracks with six new versions of previously released tracks which were only available on vinyl or in limited editions.

2004 saw a change of label for Terranova, this time to the popular Ministry of Sound. And a new album, Digital Tenderness. 2005 Terranova produced "the Lotterboys" (featuring Paris the black fu, Fetisch Terranova and shapemod). The Lotterboys album "animalia" was released the same year on Eskimo recs. In 2007 Fetisch teamed up with &me, a producer and dj from Berlin. They produced 'Terranova presents the Lottergirls together with Princess Superstar (Ministry of Sound 2008). 2007 Terranova produced "the Lottergirls" (featuring Princess Superstar, Fetisch Terranova, yoyo, &me). The Lottergirls album "right on" was released in 2008 on ministry of sound. 2008 Terranova produced "Fetisch&me". 2 singles were released the same year on Gigolo recs ("black palms" and "the calling").

Terranova have recently signed to Cologne-based label Kompakt. Their 2011 EP I Want To Go Out/Take My Hand was released on Kompakt. In February 2012, their fifth studio album 'Hotel Amour' was released on Kompakt.

Fetisch has collaborated with the cosmetics brand to create a nail polish as part of their DJ line, and created a special music mix for this collaboration.

== Discography ==
=== Albums ===
Year	Album	Additional information	Label
1997	DJ-Kicks: Terranova	DJ mix album	!K7 Records
1999	Close The Door	Debut album	Copasetik Recording
2002	Hitchhiking Nonstop With No Particular Destination	Second Studio album	!K7 Records
2002	B-Sides & Remix Sessions	A collection of B-Sides of remixes	Copasetik Recording
2003	Peace Is Tough	Third studio album: Companion CD	!K7 Records
2004	Digital Tenderness	Fourth studio album	Ministry of Sound
2012	Hotel Amour	Fifth studio album	Kompakt
2014	Hotel Amour: Nightporter	Remix album	Kompakt
2015	Restless	Sixth studio album	Kompakt

=== Singles and EPs ===
Year	Song	Album
1996	Fiasko	-
1997	Tokyo Tower	B-Sides & Remix Sessions DJ-KiCKS:
1997	Contact	DJ KiCKS:
1999	Just Enough	Close The Door B-Sides & Remix Sessions
1999	Turn Around	Close The Door
2000	Chase the Blues	Close The Door
2001	Pogo EP	-
2002	Running Away	Peace is Tough
2002	Mongril	Hitchhiking Non-Stop With No Particular Destination
2002	Sublime	Hitchhiking Non-Stop With No Particular Destination
2004	Common Grounds EP	-
2004	Common Grounds EP	Digital Tenderness
2004	The Real Thing EP	Digital Tenderness
2004	Das Plan	Digital Tenderness

=== Remixes ===
- Fischerspooner - ("Emerge") (2001)
- Ennio Morricone - ("Per Qualche Dollaro in Più" / "For A Few Dollars More") (2001)

== Collaborating artists ==
- Ari Up (The Slits)
- Cath Coffey
- Manuel Goettsching
- Alexander Hacke
- Jake
- The Beautiful Jewels
- Jayney Klimek
- Nicolette Krebitz
- Mike Ladd
- Rasco
- Tricky
- Xaver Naudascher
- Snax
