= Chartreuse (band) =

English indie rock band

- Genre: Indie rock, folk rock
- Years active: 2014–present
- Label: Communion Records
- Members: Mike Wagstaff; Harriet "Hattie" Wilson; Rory Wagstaff; Perry Lovering
- Website: www.chartreuseband.com

Chartreuse are an English indie rock band from the West Midlands, England. The group features dual lead vocalists Mike Wagstaff and Harriet ("Hattie") Wilson, with Rory Wagstaff on drums and Perry Lovering on bass. Chartreuse have released two studio albums on Communion Records: Morning Ritual (2023) and Bless You & Be Well (2025). Their music has been characterized as blending indie and folk influences with intimate dual vocals.

== Background and formation ==
Songwriters Mike Wagstaff and Harriet Wilson began playing together in 2013. The lineup solidified when Mike's brother Rory (drums) and the pair's friend Perry Lovering (bass) joined soon after. The band are based in the Black Country region of England.

== Career ==
Chartreuse issued early EPs through Communion Records, including Keep Checking Up On Me (2020) and Is It Autumn Already? (2021).

In September 2022 the band released "Satellites", a collaboration with former Maccabees frontman Orlando Weeks. Chartreuse's debut album Morning Ritual followed on 10 November 2023 via Communion. To support the album, the band opened for Local Natives on the North American "Time Will Wait for No One" tour in September 2023.

Chartreuse announced their second album, Bless You & Be Well, in June 2025, alongside the single "Fold". Recorded at the remote Flóki studio in northern Iceland with producer Sam Petts-Davies, the album was released on 29 August 2025 by Communion Records.

== Musical style and influences ==
Writers have described Chartreuse as melding indie-rock with folk elements and a subdued, soulful palette, often centred on the interplay of Wagstaff and Wilson's dual vocals. A 2025 Rolling Stone UK feature emphasised the band's close-knit dynamic and the reflective tone of their second album.

== Critical reception ==
DIY described Morning Ritual as "rich, luscious and well-crafted." Far Out praised Bless You & Be Well for its "searing vulnerability" and strong songwriting.

== Members ==
- Mike Wagstaff – vocals, guitar
- Harriet "Hattie" Wilson – vocals, keyboards
- Rory Wagstaff – drums
- Perry Lovering – bass
