= Philogresz =

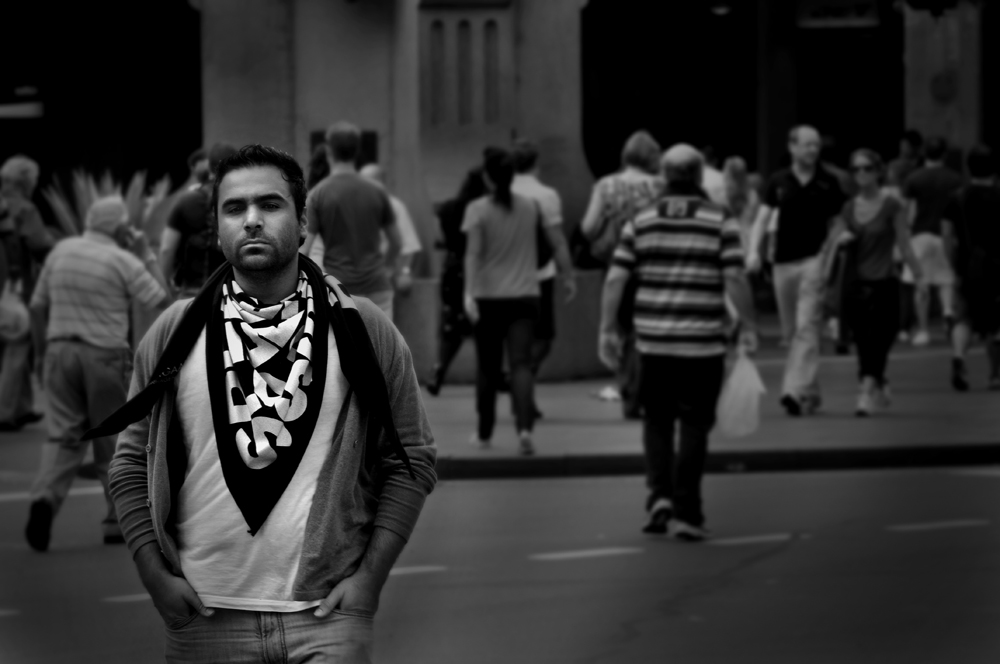
Philogresz in George Street, Sydney, Australia

Ilker Soylu (born April 16, 1984, in Istanbul, Turkey) better known for his stage name of Philogresz is a Turkish and Dutch electronic music record producer, multi-instrumentalist, teacher / lecturer, mastering and mixing engineer, based in Antwerp, Belgium.

== Life and career ==
With a career spanning nearly a decade covering genres from electronica to techno to jazzy minimal, he has released on respected electronic music labels like Ware, Treibstoff, both distributed by German electronic music distribution Kompakt. Philogresz is also known for his 2011 release on British label from Brighton; Bedrock Records. His single 'Move Me' on Progcity Deep Trax has been selected by Swiss DJ, record collector Gilles Peterson for his weekly radio-show on BBC Radio 1. His 2011 single 'Isolated Funk Ensemble' w/ Sarah Goldfarb on Treibstoff recordings has been picked by John Digweed for the prestigious mix / compilations series Structures (album)

2009 included performances at Awakenings Festival in Rotterdam - considered as one of the best techno festivals in Europe.

His Dusty Rides EP on Third Wave Black has been reviewed and tagged as a special and renewing record of 2009 by Debug

He owns record labels TEAM records (Techno, Tech house) and PHIL (electronica, Techno, House music), and has produced over 20 records since 2002.

From 2005 to date, Philogrez is an audio engineering lecturer at SAE Institute; regularly giving lectures in SAE Rotterdam, Amsterdam, Brussels and Istanbul.

== Releases ==
- Mibonsai EP - Digitude Recordings - 2007
- Debut On Blackwarm EP - Team Records - 2008
- Sentiment EP - Sound Architecture - 2009
- Dusty Rides EP - Third Wave Black - 2009
- The Dark Side - Team Records - 2009
- Milestone EP - Ware / Kompakt - 2009
- So Long Sydney - Ware / Kompakt - 2010
- Just When You Think It's Over - Treibstoff / Kompakt - 2010
- Move Me - ProgCity Deep Trax - 2010
- Dependence Of Distant Us - Phil - 2010
- Thick Dean Remixes - Team Records - 2011
- Rebel The Corrupt - Snork Enterprises - 2011
- Peter Horrevorts & Philogresz - Return Of The Titans - Team Records - 2012
- Philogresz - The Lost Movie - Album - 2014
