= DJ Bone =

American DJ and record producer

- Birth name: Eric Dulan
- Genres: Techno
- Labels: Subject Detroit, FURTHER

Eric Dulan, professionally known as DJ Bone, is an American DJ, record producer, and Detroit techno artist. His career as producer started 1999 with the label Metroplex and the maxi Riding the Thin Line. He founded his label Subject Detroit in 1998 and pursued an international career as DJ, at the same time maintaining an underground position similar to Mad Mike.
