= Pional =

- Born: Miguel Barros; Spain
- Genres: House, techno, electronic, pop
- Occupations: Music producer, songwriter, dj
- Instruments: Vocals, guitar, piano, synth, drums, bass
- Years active: 2010–present
- Labels: Hivern Discs, Young, Counter, Permanent Vacation
- Website: https://facebook.com/pional

Miguel Barros better known as Pional is a Spanish producer, remixer and electronic musician from Madrid, Spain. His solo career under the name Pional began in 2010 when he released his first EP, A Moot Point on the Hivern Discs label.

== Career ==
Pional started his career in 2006, when he released numerous singles and remixes on different labels such as Proton, Hivern Discs and Traum under the alias "Alt Fenster". In November 2011, El País noted that Pional and his most recent release—Last House on the Left—had been well received throughout Europe, even though he had yet to play in his native Madrid.

Pional provides the vocals and all the instrumentation on his tracks, and plays drum machine during live shows. He often collaborates with other artists and his more notable works are collaborations with fellow producer John Talabot. They have collaborated in the studio on many occasions, including the singles "Destiny" and "So Will Be Now" on Talabot's 2012 album ƒIN. Throughout 2012, Pional toured with John Talabot through Europe and North America supporting the album, opening for the British band The xx. The live show was charted by Resident Advisor as one of the twenty best live acts of 2012.

The Spanish newspaper El País referred to Pional as a "mainstay" of the national electronic music scene in 2012.

In 2012 Pional and Talabot wrote the song "Brave" for the Divina Pastora Marathon in Valencia. That same year he was ghostwriting for Kylie Minoge

Invisible/Amenaza, his debut EP for Young Turks, was released on November 4, 2013, on vinyl and digital formats.

== Discography ==
=== Singles ===
- A Moot Point (2010) [Hivern Discs HVN007], Vinyl-12" Limited Edition & Digital.
  - In Another Room (Original Mix)
  - In Another Room (Rebolledo Remix)
  - Cocoples de Gana (Original mix)
  - Cocoples de Gana (Basic Soul Unit Remix)
  - Cocoples de Gana Basic Soul Unit Alternative Remix)
- We Have Been Waiting For You (2010) [Hivern Discs HVN008], Vinyl-12" Limited Edition & Digital.
  - We Have Been Waiting For You (Original Mix)
  - We Have Been Waiting For You (Gavin Russom Remix)
  - We Have Been Waiting For You (Blue Daisy Remix)
- Last House on the Left (2011) [Permanent Vacation, PERMVAC 081-1], Vinyl-12" & Digital.
  - Into A Trap (Original Mix)
  - Alabama Dice (Original Mix)
  - Where Eagles Dare (Original Mix)
- Pional & Bostro Pesopeo – Yes (2011) [Permanent Vacation, PERMVAC 088-1], Vinyl-12" & Digital.
  - Yes (Original Mix)
  - Joey Jo Jo´s Temptation (Original Mix)
  - Baby Blue (Original Mix)
  - Bonus Beats (Original Mix)
- Invisible/Amenaza (2013) [Young Turks], 12" & Digital.
  - Invisible/Amenaza (Original Mix)
  - A New Dawn
  - The Shy
  - Invisible/Amenaza (Extended Dub 12" version)
- It's All Over (2014) [Hivern Discs], 12" & Digital.
  - It's All Over (Original Mix)
  - It's All Over (John Talabot's Refix)
  - It's All Over (John Talabot's Stripped Remix)
  - It's All Over (Locked Groove Rendition)
  - It's All Over (Pional's Fosc Version)
- Miracle/Tempest (2018) [Permanent Vacation – PERMVAC 168–1]
  - Miracle
  - Miracle (Pional open up mix)
  - Tempest

=== Other ===
- Pional – "The Onset" (2010) [Hivern a L'Estiu Vol.2 Compilation], Digital.
- Pional & John Talabot – "T.A.M.B" (2011) [Hivern Discs, 7HVN2], Limited Vinyl Edition.
- Pional & Henry Saiz – "Uroboros" (2011) [Balance Compilation 19], Digital.
- Pional – "Just Passing Through" (2011) [If This Is House I Want My Money Back Compilation, Permanent Vacation PERMVAC0842], Vinyl & Digital.
- John Talabot & Pional – "Destiny" (ƒIN album) Permanent Vacation, 2012.
- John Talabot & Pional – "So Will Be Now" (ƒIN album) Permanent Vacation, 2012.
- Pional & John Talabot – "Brave" (2012) Theme Song for the Valencia's Marathon, Spain, 2012.
- Blanc01 aka Pional – "It's All Over" (2013) Hivern Discs HVNBLNC01
- Lost Scripts – "I'll Be Watching You" (2013) YT2013/1
- Lost Scripts – S.O.P/ A.F.K (2016) [Hivern Discs] Vinyl Only
- Pional – "State Of Presence" (2017) [Permanent Vacation Compilation], Vinyl & Digital.
- P – "Pulstar" (2017) [Equation III, Kompakt], Vinyl Only

=== Remixes ===
- Stainboy – Sparks (Hivern Discs)
- Delorean – Real Love (True Panther Sounds/Matador Records)
- Clinic – Bubblegum (Domino Records)
- Cora Novoa – Save Me (Natura Sonoris)
- Space Ranger – Nightmoves (Lovemonk)
- Daniel Solar – A Walk in the Park (Dikso)
- Pollyester – Voices (Permanent Vacation)
- Darkness Falls – Timeline (Hfn Music)
- Nile Delta – Aztec (Cutters Records)
- Debukas – Golden Mind (2020Vision)
- RKC – Kittens Become Cats (Space Ranger Records)
- The Rapture – In The Grace Of Your Love (DFA Records)
- Lemonade – Soft Kiss (True Panther Sounds/Matador Records)
- Chairlift – I Belong in Your Arms (Young Turks)
- The XX – Chained (Young Turks/XL Recordings)
- Empress Of – Tristeza (Terrible Records)
- Pale Blue – Comes Home (2017) (MeMeMe)
