= Rare, Forever =

Studio album by Leon Vynehall
- Released: 30 April 2021
- Genre: Club, dance, electronic, experimental
- Length: 37:31
- Label: Ninja Tune

Rare, Forever is the second album by British electronic musician Leon Vynehall, released on 30 April 2021 by Ninja Tune.

== Reception ==
Rare, Forever ratings
Aggregate scores
Source	Rating
AnyDecentMusic?	7.9/10
Metacritic	84/100
Review scores
Source	Rating
AllMusic	4/5 stars
Clash	8/10
Exclaim!	7/10
The Guardian	4/5 stars
Loud and Quiet	8/10
MusicOMH	4.5/5 stars
NME	4/5 stars
Pitchfork	7.8/10
PopMatters	9/10
Resident Advisor	4/5

According to the review aggregator Metacritic, Rare, Forever received "universal acclaim" based on a weighted average score of 84 out of 100 from 11 critic scores.

AllMusic's Paul Simpson wrote, "Even at its most experimental, Vynehall's music radiates with energy and spirit, and Rare, Forever brims with a different type of excitement than his past work." Clash said "Rare, Forever adds to his intoxicating discography, unlimited in scope and undoubtedly Vynehall's most ambitious yet, resulting in one of the year's most fascinating records." Exclaim!'s Dylan Barnabe said Vynehall's "plunge into the more abstract and conceptual is a bold choice, and one that pays off." MusicOMH's Ben Devlin wrote "Vynehall's potential has always been apparent, but Rare, Forever is a truly beguiling record - equal parts poignant and hedonistic - which allows his vast array of talents to shine." NME's Thomas Smith called the album "a slippery, intoxicating listen."

Pitchfork's Shawn Reynaldo wrote "Even without any overarching narrative, Rare, Forever still feels like a triumph. At its core, the LP is a straight-up flex, the work of an artist who has learned to distill his many influences and experiments into a coherent, singular vision, and Vynehall himself is the protagonist of this particular tale", and that "There are few producers in the electronic music realm who can capably translate the 'here's some tracks I made' approach into a compelling album—folks like Floating Points and Four Tet come to mind—and it appears that Vynehall is ready to be welcomed into that cohort." Resident Advisor's Andrew Ryce wrote that "Rare, Forever has all the hallmarks of a big, crossover dance music record, but no one's doing it quite like this."

On MusicOMH's Top 50 Albums of 2021 list, Rare, Forever was ranked 37. On Stereogum's top 50 albums list for the first half of 2021, the album was ranked 36.

== Track listing ==
Rare, Forever track listing
No.	Title	Length
1.	"Ecce! Ego!"	3:33
2.	"In>Pin"	0:58
3.	"Mothra"	5:39
4.	"Alichea Vella Amor"	3:43
5.	"Snakeskin ∞ Has-Been"	4:36
6.	"Worm (& Closer & Closer)"	2:19
7.	"An Exhale"	4:22
8.	"Dumbo"	5:10
9.	"Farewell! Magnus Gabbro"	4:32
10.	"All I See Is You, Velvet Brown"	2:39
Total length:		37:31
