= Zongamin =

Japanese-born musician and producer

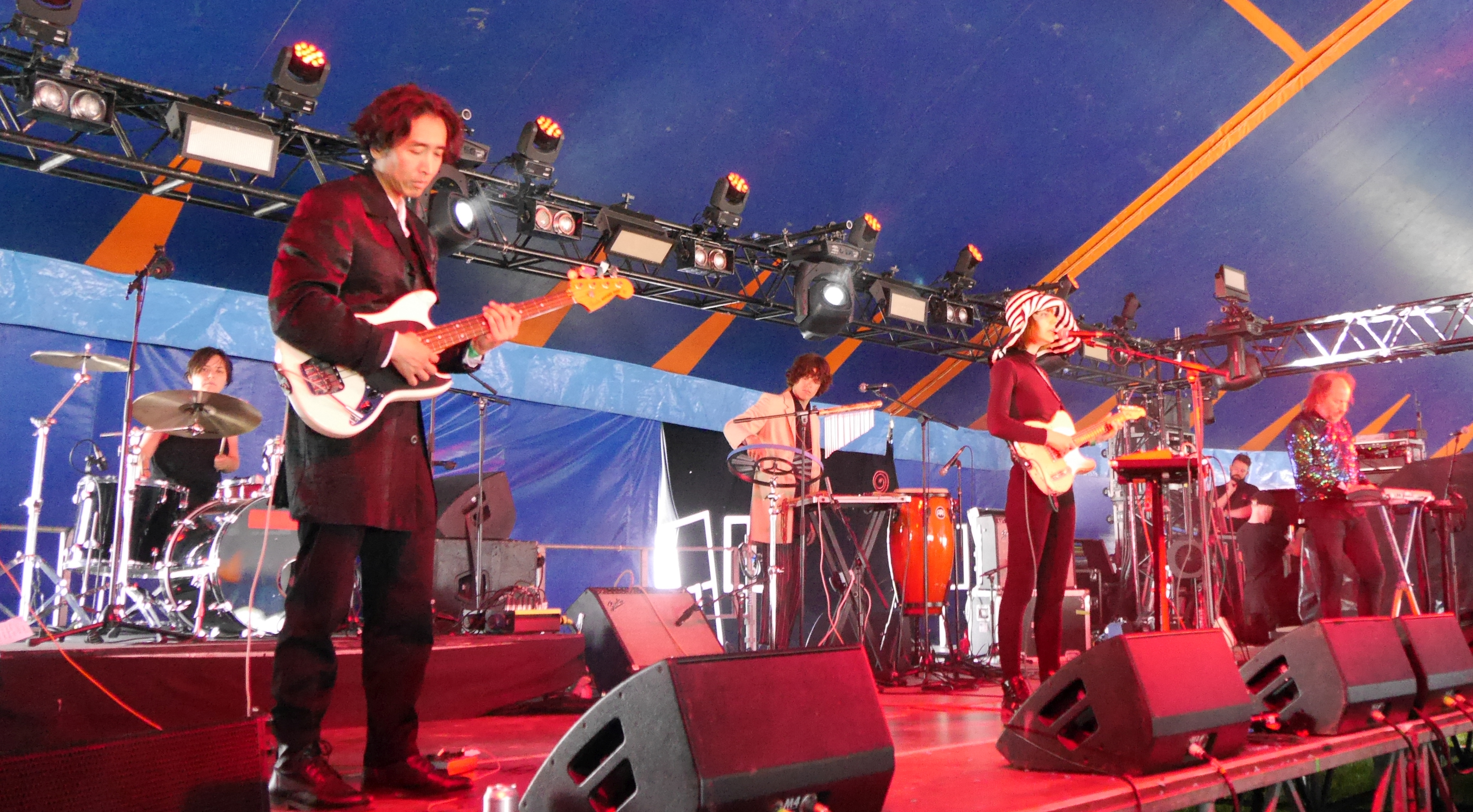
- Zongamin (2nd from left) in Vanishing Twin, Glastonbury Festival, 2019

Background information
- Birth name: Susumu Mukai
- Born: 1974 (age 50–51); Osaka, Japan
- Member of: Vanishing Twin

Susumu Mukai (born c.1974, Osaka, Japan), better known as Zongamin, is a UK-based Japanese-born musician and producer.

== Biography ==
Mukai was born in Japan and moved to East Anglia at the age of eleven. He attended Summerhill School where he started playing bass guitar and other instruments. He went on to study at the Royal College of Art, and was signed to Mike Silver's Flesh Records label.

Mukai explained his stage name: "When I started this imaginary band I wanted to name it with a new word."

Zongamin live band was formed in 2000. Past and current members : Nathalie Fowler. Mao Yamada. Leon Harris. Leo Taylor. Will Sweeney. Robert Green.

His self-titled debut album was released in 2003 by XL Recordings, and met with a positive critical response; Allmusic gave it a three-star rating, commenting on the "wealth of ideas" and an "endearing 'anything goes' playfulness" on the album. Pitchfork Media gave it 7.3/10, Gigwise.com also gave the album an enthusiastic review, calling it "a lo-tech electro-fuzz monster".

He has also acted as a remixer for Air, Playgroup, Graffiti, John Cale, Mickey Moonlight, Headman, Sandro Perri, Alexis Taylor and Seelenluft.

Since 2015, he has been a member of Vanishing Twin.

Mukai is currently also a member of Becker & Mukai, Off World, Stalactite and School Of Hypnosis.

== Musical style ==
His music has been described as "incorporating left-field disco, funk, hip-hop, and house, along with good old sloppy garage rock and spaghetti Western soundtracks", and "post punk, somewhat cheesy funkdom interspersed with droning catchy dance hooks". Gigwise.com described his debut album as "a schizophrenic shot of spaghetti western mayhem, angular foot-stamping menace, and made-in-the-kitchen-sink funk".

== Discography ==
=== Albums ===
- Zongamin (Vinyl LP; 12" album; 33 rpm). XL Recordings. 2003. ASIN B000088EGG.
- Flesh Tapes (Audio CD; imported; total 11 tracks). Flesh Records. 2004. ASIN B0002MOLL0.
- Zongamin (Audio CD; imported; total 12 tracks). Flesh Records. 2007-08-28. ASIN B000088EGH.
- "O!" (Vinyl EP; 12"; total 4 tracks). Multi Culti. 2018.

=== Singles ===
- "Serious Trouble" (2000), Flesh
- "Tunnel Music" (2001), Flesh
- "Spiral" (2002), XL
- "Serious Trouble" (2003), XL
- "Hotel 17" (2004), Kitsuné
- "Bongo Song" (2005), Ed Banger
