= Vikter Duplaix =

American singer-songwriter

- Born: October 14, 1969 (age 57); Philadelphia, Pennsylvania, United States
- Genres: R&B; neo soul; nu jazz
- Occupations: Singer-songwriter; producer; instrumentalist; DJ
- Website: www.vikterduplaix.com

Vikter Duplaix (born October 14, 1969), is an American singer-songwriter, producer, multi-instrumentalist, and DJ. Duplaix has traditional soul singer's beginnings – being raised in both Philadelphia and Augusta, Georgia singing in church choirs, and later took work programming drum tracks while working at a Philadelphia studio.

== Career ==
He has released several solo records as well as appearing on the releases of Erykah Badu, Jazzanova, King Britt's Sylk 130, Jamiroquai, Me'Shell Ndegeocello, Incognito, Esthero, Clara Hill, Jaguar Wright, Eric Benet and Dynamite MC, often with fellow studio rat James Poyser. Associations with DJ Jazzy Jeff and Kenny Gamble proved to be instrumental to his growth and stature. His relationship with King Britt led to immersion in dance music. He contributed vocals to Britt's Scuba project 'Swell,' and before long, Duplaix was producing his own material. Remixes and collaborations with the likes of Jazzanova and an installment in !K7's DJ Kicks series all led up to International Affairs, Duplaix's full-length debut as a solo artist. The album was released in Europe in late 2002; it came out in the United States early the following year on Hollywood Records.

His second album release, Bold and Beautiful, followed in 2006 on BBE records. "Make A Baby," a single from "Bold and Beautiful," was nominated for a 2008 Grammy Awards in the Grammy Award for Best Urban/Alternative Performance. On August 31, 2009 Vikter released a new single, "Electric Love." The single is available as a free download from his website. In 2012, Duplaix curated the singer Bilal's career-spanning mixtape, The Retrospection, featuring songs from his unreleased album Love for Sale.

== Selected discography ==
=== Albums ===
- International Affairs (Hollywood Records, 2002)
- Bold and Beautiful (BBE, 2006)

=== Compilation albums ===
- Singles (Prelude to the Future) (Studio !K7, 2004)

=== Mix albums ===
- DJ-Kicks (Studio !K7, 2002)
