= Leon Vynehall =

British producer and DJ

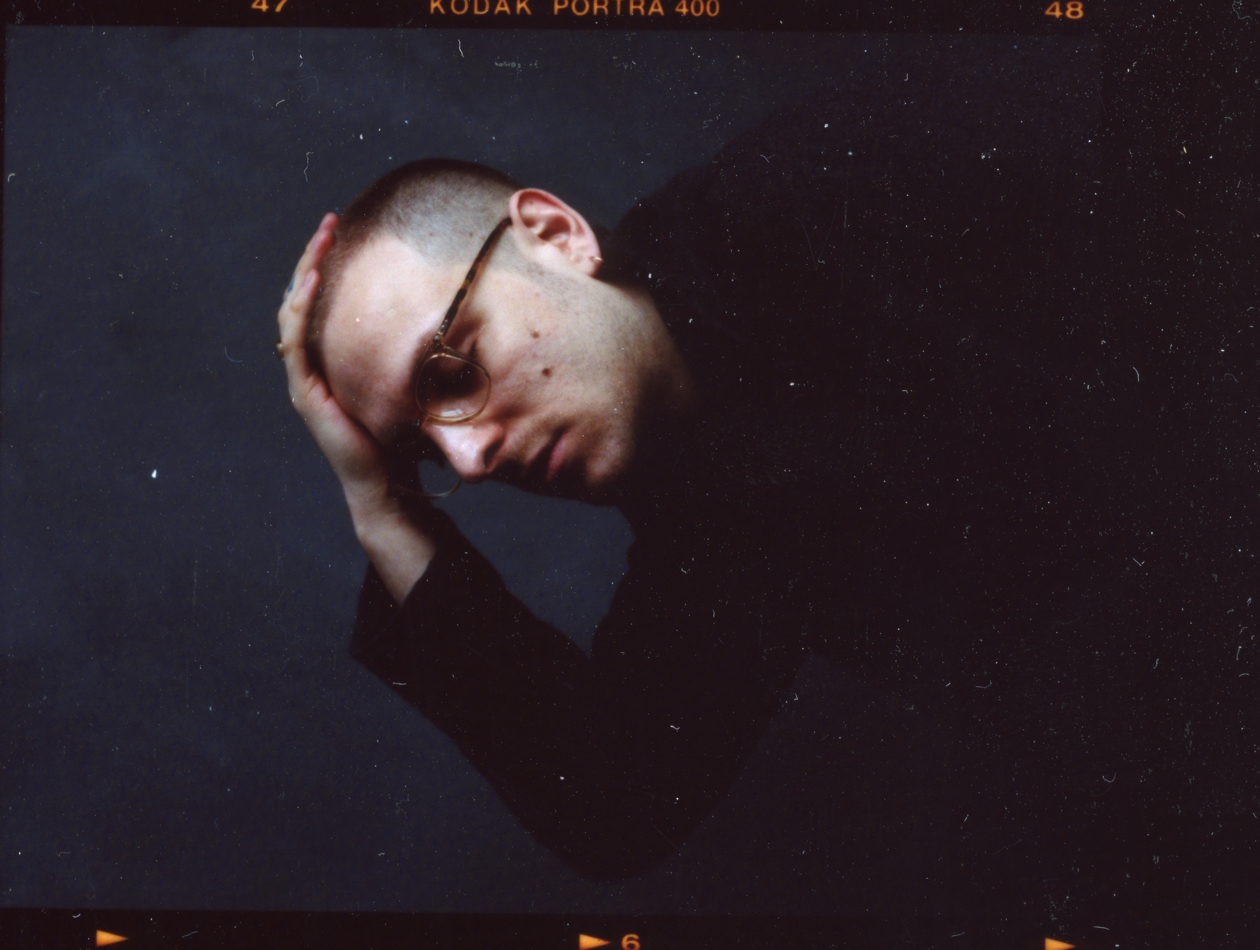
- Leon Vynehall in 2018

Background information
- Born: Pembury
- Genres: House, deep house, UK Bass
- Occupations: Electronic musician Artist
- Instruments: Synthesizer, piano, drums
- Years active: 2012 - present
- Labels: Ninja Tune; Running Back; Rush Hour; 3024; Royal Oak; Aus Music; Well Rounded Housing Project; ManMakeMusic
- Website: https://vynehall.com/

Leon Vynehall is a British artist and producer. He released his second album Rare, Forever on 30 April 2021 via Ninja Tune.

== Biography ==
After becoming a resident DJ at Akaakaroar, a Brighton club, Vynehall released several EPs on labels such as Well Rounded Housing Project and Aus. As a result of his productions, he quickly became an in-demand DJ.

His debut EP, Music for the Uninvited, was released on the label 3024 in 2014 to a positive critical reception, landing on numerous year-end lists in publications including Fact, Gorilla vs. Bear, NPR Music, Pitchfork, XLR8R and The Washington Post.

His second EP, Rojus, released on 1 April 2016, also received positive reviews. During this time Vynehall moved to the outskirts of Leicester.

On 10 April 2018 Vynehall announced his signing to UK independent label Ninja Tune. This coincided with the announcement of his debut full-length album Nothing Is Still, which was due for release on 15 June 2018. The inspiration for the album came from Vynehall's grandparents. Their emigration from the south-east of the United Kingdom to New York City in the 1960s, their seven-day journey via boat from Southampton to Brooklyn and other stories, only came to light upon the passing of his grandfather four years previous. The album also included a novella and set of short films. The first single from the album was "Envelopes (Chapter VI)", described by Pitchfork as "heart-rending experimental electronica", received coverage in a large number of notable online and print publications including NME, Pitchfork, Resident Advisor, Mixmag, Fact, XLR8R, DIY, Clash, Mojo, The Vinyl Factory and more. The track received widespread radio play on stations such as BBC Radio 1, BBC Radio 1Xtra, BBC 6 Music and Gilles Peterson's WorldWide FM.

According to Pitchfork, Vynehall's music combines the "percussive energy of contemporary House music" with "rich harmonies of sample-centric producers". Vynehall lists Aphex Twin, Afrika Bambaataa, Man Parrish and DJ Shadow as some of his major influences.

Rare, Forever, Vynehall's second studio album, was released on 30 April 2021 and received widespread critical acclaim from Pitchfork, The Guardian, Clash, Loud and Quiet, Resident Advisor, NME, AllMusic, and many other publications.

== Personal life ==
Leon Vynehall is married to Moxie (DJ) who he married in April 2023.

== Discography ==
=== Studio albums ===
- Nothing Is Still (Ninja Tune, 2018)
- Rare, Forever (Ninja Tune, 2021)
- In Daytona Yellow (Studio Ooze, 2025)

=== EPs ===
- Gold Language EP (ManMakeMusic, 2012)
- Brother / Sister EP (Aus Music, 2013)
- Open EP (3024, 2013)
- Rosalind (Well Rounded Housing Project, 2013)
- Butterflies (Royal Oak, 2014)
- Music for the Uninvited (3024, 2014)
- Rojus (Designed To Dance) (Running Back, 2016)
- I, Cavallo (Ninja Tune, 2019)
- Endless (I&II) (Studio Ooze, 2022)
- Sugar Slip (The Lick) [Remixes] (fabric Records, 2022)
- Music for the Uninvited (10 Year Anniversary) (Studio Ooze, 2024)

=== Singles ===
- "Mauve" (Well Rounded Housing Project, 2012)
- "Midnight On Rainbow Road" (Rush Hour, 2016)
- "Envelopes (Chapter VI)" (Ninja Tune, 2018)
- "Sugar Slip (The Lick)" (fabric, 2022)
- "Rosebud - Single" (Studio Ooze, 2023)
- "Rosebud / Black Dove - Single" (Studio Ooze, 2023)
- "Duofade" (Studio Ooze, 2023)
- "SHELLAC" (Studio Ooze, 2024)
- "TEARS4ALOVER" (Studio Ooze, 2025)
- "Mirror's Edge" (featuring POiSON ANNA) (Studio Ooze, 2025)
- "Cruel Love" (featuring Beau Nox) (Studio Ooze, 2025)
- "Scab" (featuring TYSON) (Studio Ooze, 2025)
- "Undo (Your Body)" (Studio Ooze, 2025)

=== DJ mixes ===
- Podcast 281 (XLR8R, 2013)
- FactMix 028 (Fact, 2014)
- Essential Mix (BBC Radio 1, 2016)
- .644 Leon Vynehall - 2018.10.01 (Resident Advisor, 2018)
- DJ-Kicks: Leon Vynehall (2019)
- fabric presents Leon Vynehall (2022)
- Beats in Space 076: Leon Vynehall (2023)

=== Remixes ===
- "Acid Splash (Leon Vynehall Translation)" on Twenty Mids by Kevin Griffiths (2012)
- "Feel Like Movin' (Leon Vynehall Remix)" on Feel Like Movin' (Remixes) by The Juan MacLean (2013)
- "We Continue (Vynehall's Basement Dub)" on We Continue by Severn Beach (2013)
- "For (Yacht) Club Use Only (Vynehall's Port Side Manoeuver, 130 Knots Mix)" on Trace / For (Yacht) Club Use Only Remixes by Midland (2014)
- "Somehow (Leon Vynehall Translation)" on Somehow / Motion by Ratcatcher (2014)
- "Love & Hate (Leon Vynehall Love Rework)" by Michael Kiwanuka (2016)
- "Tonight May Have To Last Me All My Life (Dragged By Leon Vynehall)" on Since I Left You (20th Anniversary Deluxe Edition) by The Avalanches (2021)
