= John Talabot =

Spanish DJ (born 1982)

- Born: Oriol Riverola; 8 January 1982 (age 44)
- Origin: Barcelona
- Genres: House; electronic
- Occupations: DJ; musician
- Labels: Hivern Discs; Permanent Vacation; Young

Oriol Riverola (born 8 January 1982), better known by his stage name John Talabot, is a Spanish DJ, record label owner, producer, and electronic musician from Barcelona, Spain.

== Musical career ==
After initially producing tracks under the name d.a.r.y.l, Riverola began releasing music as John Talabot in 2009 (a name taken from the school he attended in Barcelona). His 2010 release "Sunshine" was followed by his debut EP, Families in 2011 on the Young Turks label.

Talabot released his debut album ƒIN in January 2012 on Permanent Vacation. The record was generally well received with critics, receiving a 5 star review from The Guardian.

Despite not releasing a solo album since ƒIN, Talabot has released music consistently including remixes of artists from The XX to Sfire to Shit Robot. In social media posts Talabot has hinted that work is ongoing for his second LP.

The Hivern label was founded by Riverola in 2008, the name coming from the Catalan word for "winter". The label has released work from artists including Pional, Marvin & Guy, Margot and John Talabot himself. Consistent releases on the label as well as showcase events around Europe have helped establish Hivern as an influential body on the European electronic music scene.

Talabot's 2016 release "Voices" was used as part of Chanel's promotional content for the fashion house's Spring-Summer 2017 Haute Couture collection.

=== Live Performances ===
Following the success of the ƒIN album Riverola established himself on the international DJ circuit. This was helped by a 2012 tour with The xx in North America which allowed him to reach a wider audience. In 2017 Talabot performed several shows with Axel Boman as Talaboman including a headline show at the Primavera festival in Barcelona.

=== Side projects ===
Talabot has been involved in a number of side projects teaming up with Mark Piñol under the name "Quentin", with long time collaborator Pional as "Lost Scripts", with other members of the Hivern Label as "Parple" and most notably with Swedish producer Axel Boman for "Talaboman". The latter originating from a track, "Sideral" the two produced for Talabot's 2014 DJ Kicks mix. This was followed with a double EP/LP "The Night Land" which was released in March 2017.

In January 2018, Talabot began a monthly show "Music for Days Like This" on online station NTS Radio.

== Discography ==
=== Mix albums ===
- DJ-Kicks: John Talabot (!K7, 2013)

=== Studio albums ===
- ƒIN (Permanent Vacation, 2012)
- The Night Land (R&S, 2017) (as Talaboman)

=== Singles & EPs ===
- "My Old School" (Permanent Vacation, 2009)
- "Sunshine" (Hivern Discs, 2009)
- "Mathilda's Dream" (Permanent Vacation, 2010)
- "Families" (Young Turks, 2011)
- "Lamento" (Young Turks, 2009)
- "So Will Be Now" (Permanent Vacation, 2013)
- "Without You" (!K7 Records, 2015)
- "Machine - (John Talabot's Synthedit) / Peter (The Drifter Edit)" (Philomena, 2015)
- "Master - DreadMan" (John Talabot's Dusty Edit), (Hivern Discs, 2015)
- Sfire 3 (John Talabot Remixes) (CockTail d'Amore Music, Muting the Noise, 2016)
- "Voices" (Permanent Vacation, 2016)
- "The Strange Silence" (Permanent Vacation, 2017)
- "Melbourne Bolero / Madhouse Dub" (The Night Land, 2023) (as Talaboman)
- "Bosca Bosca / Bosco Bosco" (The Night Land, 2023) (as Talaboman)
