= DJ Cam =

French record producer (born 1973)

- Born: Laurent Daumail; 1973 (age 52–53); Paris, France
- Genres: Hip hop; instrumental hip hop; trip hop; ambient; chill-out
- Years active: 1990–present
- Labels: Inflamable; Columbia
- Website: inflamable.com

Laurent Daumail (born 1973), better known by his stage name DJ Cam, is a French record producer and a disc jockey. Daumail's music is largely rooted in hip hop, combined with elements of jazz, dub, and ambient and composed using samples. Daumail first rose to prominence in the 1990s with records such as Underground Vibes and Underground Live, which have been credited as early examples of trip hop, and he emerged as a leading figure in the decade's "ambient hip-hop" scene. He founded the record label Inflamable. In addition to his own musical output, Daumail has produced several compilations and albums for other artists.

Underground Vibes is frequently cited as one of the first complete instrumental hip hop albums, credited with laying the foundations for the French trip hop movement and the subsequent evolution of lo-fi and chill-out music.

Fact named his 1996 release Abstract Manifesto the ninth best trip hop album of all time.

== Discography ==
=== Studio albums ===
- Underground Vibes (1995)
- Substances (1996)
- Abstract Manifesto (1996)
- The Beat Assassinated (1998)
- Loa Project (Volume II) (2000)
- Soulshine (2002)
- Liquid Hip Hop (2004)
- Seven (2011)
- Miami Vice (2015)
- Beats (with Moar) (2016)
- Thug Love (2017)
- 90s (2019)

With DJ Cam Quartet

- Rebirth of Cool (2008)
- Diggin' (2009)
- Stay (2009)
- The Soulshine Session (2016)

=== Live albums ===
- Underground Live (1996)
- Live in Paris (2017)

=== Mix albums ===
- Mad Blunted Jazz (1996)
- DJ-Kicks: DJ Cam (1997)
