= Peter Kruder =

Austrian musician and artist

Peter Kruder (born 1967 in Vienna, Austria) is a Viennese artist, producer and DJ. Together with his partner Richard Dorfmeister he is the founder of the duo Kruder & Dorfmeister and the record label G-Stone Recordings. Since the release of the G-Stoned EP (G-Stone, 1994), Peter Kruder has produced a broad range of work.

== Career ==
The Kruder & Dorfmeister releases DJ-Kicks: Kruder & Dorfmeister (!K7, 1996) and The K&D Sessions (!K7, 1998) are considered pioneering in electronic music. The sound that was formulated became known as downtempo, showing that electronic music need not be confined to cold sounds and metallic beats but could embody sensuality and a deep soulfulness. Both releases have been global bestsellers, with K&D Sessions having sold more than one million copies worldwide and being considered one of the most influential albums of the 1990s.

In parallel to his partnership with Dorfmeister, Peter Kruder has also followed his solo projects. In 1999, Kruder released his highly acclaimed debut album Peace Orchestra, combining soul, hip hop, jazz and dub music. He also remixed numerous artists including Bebel Gilberto, Fauna Flash and more. With Fauna Flash – Munich DJs and producers Christian Prommer and Roland Appel – Kruder kicked off the Voom:Voom project in 2001, which focused on a new interpretation of the vast legacy of Detroit techno and deep house.

Throughout the last decade, Peter Kruder produced various artists, such as Marsmobil, Urbs, Christian Prommer's Drumlesson as well as DJ Hell's highly acclaimed Teufelswerk album. Additionally, he has released various singles under his own name on labels such as International DeeJay Gigolo Records, Macro, 2DIY4 and the Compost Black Label.

2010 saw the 16th anniversary of Kruder & Dorfmeister and G-Stone which resulted in the Sixteen F**kin Years of G-Stone Recordings compilation and the development of the K&D Sessions Live show with Richard Dorfmeister. The show included visuals by longtime G-Stone VJ collaborator Fritz Fitzke and MC performances by Earl Zinger and MC Ras T-Weed. With performances at The Big Chill, Berlin Festival and numerous other high-profile festivals, the K&D Sessions Live show became an instant success and a world tour ensued.

== Discography ==
=== Album Productions ===
- Christian Prommer – Drumlesson Zwei (Studio !K7, 2010)
- Marsmobil – (Why Don't You Take) The Other Side? (G-Stone Recordings, Compost Records, 2010)
- DJ Hell – Teufelswerk (International Deejay Gigolo Records, 2009)
- Voom:Voom – Mixes (G-Stone, 2009)
- Marsmobil – Une affaire de mode et de musique (Compost, 2007)
- Marsmobil – Minx (Compost, 2006)
- Voom:Voom – PengPeng (!K7, 2006)
- Peace Orchestra – Reset (G-Stone, !K7, 2002)
- Peace Orchestra – Peace Orchestra (G-Stone, 1999)

=== Singles & EPs ===
- Peter Kruder – Boxer 100 (Boxer Recordings, 2016)
- Peter Kruder – “Xenomorph / Vespertilio” (Macro, 2012)
- Various – “Young Girl” (2DIY4, 2011)
- Peter Kruder – “Chordal / Law of Return” (Macro, 2009)
- Peter Kruder – “After the Dawn / Before Night Falls” (Compost Black Label, 2009)
- Peter Kruder – “Hard to Find” (International Deejay Gigolo, 2009)
- Peter Kruder – “Visions Ltd.” (International Deejay Gigolo, 2009)
- DJ Hell – “U Can Dance” (International Deejay Gigolo, 2009)
- Peter Kruder – “Coste” (G-Stone, 2008)
- Kruder & Dorfmeister – “Shakatakadoodub” (G-Stone, 2008)
- Voom:Voom – “Remixes Part 2” (G-Stone, 2007)
- Voom:Voom – “Remixes Part 1” (G-Stone, 2007)
- Voom:Voom – “PengPeng 01-04” (!K7, 2006)
- Voom:Voom – “Baby 3” (Compost, 2003)
- Kruder & Dorfmeister – “G-Stoned” (G-Stone, 2003)
- Voom:Voom – “Ginger & Fred / Influenza Forte” (Compost, 2001)
- Voom:Voom – “Poppen / Influenza” (Compost, 2000)
- Peace Orchestra – “Shining Repolished Versions” (G-Stone, 2000)
- Peter Kruder – “Root Down” (Compost, 2000)
- Rockers Hi-Fi Meets Kruder & Dorfmeister – “Going Under” (WEA, 1997)
- Waldeck – “Northern Lights” (Spray Records, 1996)

=== Compilations & Mixes ===
- Peter Kruder – G-Stone Master Series No.1 – Peter Kruder Private Collection (G-Stone, 2009)
- Kruder & Dorfmeister – The K&D Sessions (!K7, 1998)
- Kruder & Dorfmeister – Conversions: A K&D Selection (Spray Records/Shadow Records, 1996)
- DJ-Kicks: Kruder & Dorfmeister (!K7, 1996)

=== Remixes ===
- Hell – “Germania (Peter Kruder Remix)” (International Deejay Gigolo, 2011)
- Prommer & Barck – “Dr. Jeckyl and Mr. Hyde (Peter Kruder Remix)” (Derwin Recordings, 2011)
- Stereotyp – “Take the Weight (Peter Kruder Mix)” (G-Stone, 2009)
- Zero db – “Te quiero (Peter Kruder Remix)” (Ninja Tune, 2008)
- Mike Monday – “Zum Zum (Peter Kruder Mix)” (Great Stuff, 2008)
- Christian Prommer Drumlesson – “Rej (Peter Kruder Remix)” (Sonar Kollektiv, 2008)
- Hell – “Listen to the Hiss (Peter Kruder's Nu Groove Mix)” (International Deejay Gigolo, 2004)
- Shaun Escoffery – “Space Rider (Peter Kruder Remix)” (Oyster Music, 2003)
- Fauna Flash – “Tel Aviv (Peter Kruder's Bum Rush the Discothèque Remix)” (Compost, 2002)
- Bebel Gilberto – “Tanto Tempo (Peter Kruder Remix)” (Six Degrees Records, 2001)
- Gotan Project – “Triptico (Peter Kruder Trip de luxe)” (¡Ya basta!, 2001)
- Chateau Flight – “Auto Power (Peter Kruder Auto Mix)” (Versatile Records, 2001)
- Kosma – “Odessa (Peter Kruders Broadcast from the Inside)” (INFRACom!, 2000)
- Trüby Trio – “Donaueschingen (Peter Kruder's Donaudampfschifffahrtsgesellschaftskapitänskajütenremix)” (Compost, 1998)
- Roni Size / Reprazent – “Heroes (Kruder Long Loose Bossa)” (Talkin' Loud, 1997)
