= No Hassle =

Studio album by Tosca
- Released: April 21, 2009
- Genre: Ambient dub, downtempo, trip hop
- Label: Studio !K7

Tosca chronology
| J.A.C. (2005) | No Hassle (2009) | Odeon (2013) |

Professional ratings
Review scores
| Source | Rating |
|---|---|
| PopMatters | 7/10 link |

No Hassle is the fifth studio album by Austrian downtempo / trip-hop duo Tosca, released by Studio !K7 in 2009. The album was "conceived as a single seamless sea of sound." No Hassle includes no featured vocal tracks, and instead marks Tosca's return to vocal samples and the "use of the voice as an instrument" last heard on the 2000 album Suzuki.

The cover contains a picture of Manhattan viewed from Long Island City, Queens.

== Track listing ==
=== Studio ===
1. "My First" – 5:42
2. "Elitsa" – 4:55
3. "Springer" – 5:12
4. "Birthday" – 4:49
5. "Oysters in May" – 4:36
6. "Joe Si Ha" – 4:09
7. "Elektra Bregenz" – 4:08
8. "Fondue" – 3:33
9. "Rosa" – 5:07
10. "Raymondo" – 5:16
11. "Mrs Bongo" – 5:34
12. "No Hassle" - 6:24

=== Live ===
1. "Piano Intro" - 4:14
2. "No Hassle" - 5:49
3. "Oysters In May" - 4:55
4. "My First Ambient" - 1:10
5. "My First" - 5:29
6. "Springer Ambient" - 2:00
7. "Springer" - 5:22
8. "Knoll" - 4:32
9. "Joe Si Ha" - 3:51
10. "Elektra Bregenz" - 4:36
11. "Birthday" - 4:31
12. "Utrecht Spa" - 4:24
13. "Mrs. Bongo" - 5:33
14. "Rosa" - 6:24

== Personnel ==
- Richard Dorfmeister
- Rupert Huber
