= The K&D Sessions =

Compilation album (Mix album) by Kruder & Dorfmeister
- Released: 5 October 1998
- Genre: Trip hop, jazzstep, downtempo, breakbeat
- Length: 126:43
- Label: Studio !K7

Kruder & Dorfmeister chronology
DJ-Kicks (1996)	The K&D Sessions (1998)

The K&D Sessions is the second DJ mix compilation album by the Vienna-based duo Kruder & Dorfmeister. Released by Studio !K7 in 1998 to glowing reviews, the album features two original songs among the remixes.

== Style ==
The compilation album is a selection of remixes produced in the previous five years by either Richard Dorfmeister, Peter Kruder or the two together. The album also contains two original productions. Dorfmeister stated that they worked about two weeks on each remix. John Bush of AllMusic described the album's sound as "earthy, downtempo and acid-based, even more so than previous mix albums by the pair."

== Release ==
The K&D Sessions was released on 5 October 1998 in both a two-disc CD set and a four-disc vinyl set by Studio !K7. On 28 February 1999, Kruder & Dorfmeister started on a ten city tour of North America to promote the album.

After the release and success of the album, the group received several requests from artists for remixes, all of which they turned down. Dorfmeister stated that they had felt like they had "already done it," adding: "I'd rather release nothing than something that is half and half. ... Perhaps we don't have so much output, but at least then we don't release some bullshit."

== Reviews ==
Professional ratings
Review scores
Source	Rating
AllMusic	5/5 stars
Encyclopedia of Popular Music	4/5 stars
The Independent	4/5 stars
Muzik	4/5 stars
NME	6/10
Pitchfork	7.4/10
The Rolling Stone Album Guide	3/5 stars
Spin	8/10

The K&D Sessions received acclaim on its release. Spike Magazine gave the album a positive review, stating that it is "one of those albums that comes out of the blue, providing a whole bunch of surprises to make even the most jaded get excited about music again." Spin felt that The K&D Sessions has "less scope and vibrancy" than the duo's DJ Kicks album, but nonetheless praised it as a more consistent release. Spin later placed the album at number 19 on their list of top 20 albums of 1999. Music database AllMusic gave the album five stars out of five, opining that "the impossibly deep beats on almost every track simply couldn't have been recorded by any other act" and referring to the music as "the most blissfully blunted music the world has ever heard."

Feeling that the album was overlong, the NME gave the album a mixed review, asking "does the world really need to own both their reappraisals of Bomb the Bass' 'Bug Powder Dust', even if the first one is a corker?" Pitchfork also noted the length of the album referring to the second disc as "thoroughly boring", but praising the album stating "a handful of the tracks on this sprawling two-CD set demonstrate a mastery of rhythm unseen in DJ'd music since DJ Shadow bestowed upon us the gift of Endtroducing...... Out of the depths of their remix material's musical void, Kruder and Dorfmeister assemble organic downtempo triumphs which may alone be sufficient to perpetuate the otherwise trite brand of music currently labeled 'trip-hop.'"

== Track listing ==
CD one
No.	Title	Artist(s)	Length
1.	"Heroes" (Kruder's Long Loose Bossa remixed by Peter Kruder)	Roni Size	6:30
2.	"Jazz Master" (K&D Session)	Alex Reece	8:20
3.	"Speechless" (Drum 'n' Bass remixed by Peter Kruder)	Count Basic	6:37
4.	"Going Under" (K&D Session)	Rockers Hi-Fi	8:37
5.	"Bug Powder Dust" (K&D Session)	Bomb the Bass	7:20
6.	"Rollin' on Chrome" (Wild Motherfucker Dub remixed by Richard Dorfmeister)	Aphrodelics	5:39
7.	"Useless" (K&D Session)	Depeche Mode	6:13
8.	"Gotta Jazz" (remixed by Richard Dorfmeister)	Count Basic	5:32
9.	"Donaueschingen" (Peter Kruder's Donaudampfschifffahrtsgesellschaftskapitänskajütenremix)	Rainer Trüby Trio	6:55
10.	"Trans Fatty Acid" (K&D Session)	Lamb	8:33

CD two
No.	Title	Artist(s)	Length
1.	"Gone" (K&D Session)	David Holmes	8:29
2.	"Sofa Rockers" (Richard Dorfmeister Remix)	Sofa Surfers	4:30
3.	"Eastwest" (Stoned Together resmoked by Richard Dorfmeister)	Mama Oliver	5:11
4.	"Bug Powder Dust" (Dub remixed by Kruder & Dorfmeister)	Bomb the Bass	6:20
5.	"Boogie Woogie"	Kruder & Dorfmeister	3:20
6.	"Where Shall I Turn" (K&D Session Vol. 2)	Sin	5:53
7.	"1st of tha Month" (K&D Session)	Bone Thugs-n-Harmony	5:49
8.	"Lexicon"	Kruder & Dorfmeister	1:06
9.	"Bomberclaad Joint" (K&D Session)	Knowtoryous	3:47
10.	"Going Under" (Evil Love and Insanity Dub remixed by Kruder & Dorfmeister)	Rockers Hi-Fi	4:30
11.	"Million Town" (K&D Session)	Strange Cargo	7:32

== Personnel ==
- Oliver Kartak – photography
- Peter Kruder – remixing
- Richard Dorfmeister – remixing

== Certifications ==
Region	Certification	Certified units/sales
Austria (IFPI Austria)	Gold	25,000^{*}
United Kingdom (BPI)	Gold	100,000^{^}
Summaries
Europe	—	500,000
Worldwide	—	1,000,000
^{*} Sales figures based on certification alone.^{^} Shipments figures based on certification alone.

== See also ==
- 1998 in music
