= Odeon (album) =

Studio album by Tosca
- Released: February 5, 2013
- Length: 51:25
- Label: Studio !K7

Tosca chronology
No Hassle (2009)	Odeon (2013)	Going, Going, Going (2017)

Professional ratings
Review scores
Source	Rating
AllMusic	3.5/5 stars

Odeon is the sixth studio album and second concept album by Tosca released under Studio !K7.

== Track listing ==
1. Zur Guten Ambience - 3:01
2. What If - 4:55
3. Heatwave - 5:39
4. JayJay - 6:18
5. Soda - 2:33
6. Meixner - 6:04
7. Stuttgart - 5:46
8. In My Brain Prinz Eugen - 5:06
9. Cavallo - 6:39
10. Bonjour - 5:24

== Personnel ==
=== Tosca ===
- Richard Dorfmeister - composer, primary artist, producer
- Rupert Huber - composer, primary artist, producer

=== Other musicians on the album ===
- Sarah Carlier - composer, lyricist, vocals
- Chris Eckman - composer, lyricist, vocals
- Rodney Hunter - vocals
- J.J.Jones - composer, lyricist, vocals
- Lucas Santtana - composer, lyricist, vocals
- Roland Neuwirth - composer, lyricist, vocals
- Calyx Berlin - mastering
- Stefan Beyer - design
- Markus Rössle - photography
- Colin Snapp - visual arts
