= Opera (Tosca album) =

Studio album by Tosca
- Released: 1997
- Genre: Trip hop
- Length: 50:12
- Labels: G-Stone Recordings, Studio !K7
- Producers: Richard Dorfmeister, Rupert Huber

Tosca chronology
Opera (1997)	Suzuki (2000)

Professional ratings
Review scores
Source	Rating
Allmusic	4/5 stars

Opera is the debut studio album by Austrian duo Tosca. It combines new material and previously released singles, including "Chocolate Elvis". "Irresistibly funky" (BBC), "the blues, and the thick sultry bass, makes it as sexy and melancholy as cigarette smoke after a one-night stand in a strange city" (Mixmag). It is "one of the few sure things in a modest genre" (Sasha Frere-Jones, LA Weekly).

== Track list ==
1. Fuck Dub, Pts. 1 & 2 – 8:55
2. Amalienbad – 1:28
3. Worksong – 6:00
4. Gimmi Gimmi – 4:45
5. Ladies + Gentlemen – 0:20
6. Chocolate Elvis – 5:00
7. Ambient Emely – 8:05
8. Postgirl – 4:25
9. Listen My Friend – 1:04
10. Buona Sarah – 10:10

All tracks written by Richard Dorfmeister and Rupert Huber.
