= Grain (disambiguation) =

Grains are the seeds of arable crops or the crops bearing them.

Grain or grains may also refer to:

== Material structures ==
- Grain (textile), the orientation of a woven textile used in a garment
- Grain, a solid-fuel rocket's propellant charge; roughly a hollow cylinder, sometimes textured, and possibly very large
- Crystallite or "grain" in metallurgy, a single crystal inside solid-state matter
- Film grain, the gritty texture sometimes apparent on images produced using photographic film or paper (grainy)
- Grain size (or particle size), for particles of rock in geology
- Paper grain, the texture and structure of paper
- Wood grain, the alignment and texture of the fibres in wood

== Places ==
- Isle of Grain in Kent, England
  - Grain Power Station, a power station on the Isle of Grain
- Grain Valley, Missouri, a city in the US

== Arts, entertainment, and media ==
- Grain (film), 2015 European film by Semih Kaplanoğlu
- Grain (magazine), a Canadian literary magazine
- Grains (Boozoo Bajou album), 2009 album
- "The Grain", an 1886 short story by Leo Tolstoy

== Other uses ==
- Grain (unit), a unit of mass equal to 64.79891 milligrams, 1/7,000 of an avoirdupois pound
  - Grains per gallon, a unit of water hardness
- Grain (cipher), a stream cipher designed for restricted hardware environments
  - Grain 128a, successor of Grain cipher
- Grain (surfboard company), a company that manufactures hollow wooden surfboards
- Grain (company), a Series B Singaporean food-delivery startup
- GRAIN, an international non-governmental organization for sustainable agriculture
- Grain of salt, an idiom

== See also ==
- Granule (disambiguation)
- Peter Grain (disambiguation)
