= Suzuki (album) =

Studio album by Tosca
- Released: February 22, 2000
- Genre: Downtempo, electronica, trip hop, chill out, nu jazz
- Length: 59:32
- Label: G-Stone Recordings, Studio !K7
- Producer: Richard Dorfmeister, Rupert Huber

Tosca chronology
Opera (1997)	Suzuki (2000)	Dehli9 (2003)

Professional ratings
Review scores
Source	Rating
Allmusic	4/5 stars

Suzuki is the second studio album by Austrian duo Tosca, released by Studio !K7 and G-Stone Recordings in 2000. Unlike many of Tosca's subsequent releases, Suzuki is essentially an instrumental album, with vocal samples integrated throughout, but in such a way that they "become a part of the instrumentation."

The album is dedicated to the Zen master Shunryu Suzuki. The dedication can be found on the inside of the front cover.

A dub remix album, Suzuki In Dub, was released in October of the same year, and the compilation of remixes of "Honey", Different Tastes of Honey, was released in 2002.

The song "Doris Dub" is a remix of the song "To Ulrike M." by Doris Days, and appears as the second half of the original remix by the group in 1998.

It was awarded a gold certification from the Independent Music Companies Association which indicated sales of at least 100,000 copies throughout Europe.

== Track listing ==
1. "Pearl In"
2. "Suzuki"
3. "Annanas"
4. "Orozco"
5. "Busenfreund"
6. "Honey"
7. "Boss On the Boat"
8. "John Tomes"
9. "Ocean Beat"
10. "The Key"
11. "Doris Dub"
12. "Pearl Off"

== Personnel ==
- Richard Dorfmeister
- Rupert Huber
- Anna Clementi, Mike Daliot - Vocals
- Bo Kondren - Mastering
