= Boozoo Bajou =

German musical duo

- Origin: Nuremberg, Germany
- Genres: Downtempo, dub, dubtronica
- Years active: 1997–present
- Labels: Studio !K7; Stereo Deluxe; Apollo; Pilotton
- Members: Peter Heider; Florian Seyberth
- Website: www.boozoobajou.com www.boozoobajou-grains.com

Boozoo Bajou is a German musical duo composed of Florian Seyberth and Peter Heider. They are noted for their distinct blend of Cajun sounds with island rhythms. Their first album, Satta, was released in 2001. In 2005 they released Dust My Broom. The list of Boozoo Bajou remixes for other artists includes Common, Tosca, Trüby Trio, and Tony Joe White.

== Discography ==
=== Studio albums ===
- Satta (2001)
- Dust My Broom (2005)
- Grains (2009)
- 4 (2014)
- Finistère (2023)
- Aurelia (2025)

=== EP's ===
- Jan Mayen (2013)
- Lambique (2021)

=== Compilations ===
- Juke Joint (2003)
- Remixes (2003)
- Juke Joint Vol. II (2006)

=== Compilation appearances ===
- 1999: Glücklich III
- 2000: Om Lounge Volume 3
- 2001: Coffeeshop Volume 4
- 2001: Bar Lounge Classics Volume 01
- 2002: Bar Lounge Classics Volume 02
- 2003: Later - The Bee
- 2004: The Outernational Sound / Thievery Corporation
- 2004: Bar Lounge Classics Weekend Edition
- 2005: Impulsive! Revolutionary Jazz Reworked
- 2006: Brazilectro Session 8
- 2006: Hed Kandi - Serve Chilled
- 2007: The Bria Project - Poolside Affair Vol. 1
- 2009: Bar Lounge Classics Deluxe Edition
- 2010: Coming Home
