= DJ-Kicks: Trüby Trio =

Mixtape by Various artists
- Released: August 27, 2001
- Label: Studio !K7

DJ-Kicks chronology
Nightmares on Wax (2000)	Trüby Trio (2001)	Vikter Duplaix (2002)

Professional ratings
Review scores
Source	Rating
Allmusic	4/5 stars

DJ Kicks: Trüby Trio is a DJ mix album, mixed by Trüby Trio. It was released on 27 August 2001 on the Studio !K7 independent record label as part of the DJ-Kicks series.

== Track listing ==
1. "Medley: General Science/Ish/PapaLaBas" - Conjure - 4:40
2. "High Jazz" - Trüby Trio - 7:01
3. "Find an Oasis" - Block 16 - 5:14
4. "Edony 'Clap Your Hands'" - Africanism ft. Hassam Ramzy - 4:07
5. "Scat Box" - Matthaus - 2:10
6. "Granada" - Slow Supreme - 4:37
7. "Upsolid" - Sequel - 6:03
8. "Transcend Me" - Afronaught - 7:13
9. "Some People (Waiwan Remix)" - Korova - 5:06
10. "One and the Same (Jazztronik Brushed Up Mix)" - Modaji - 5:45
11. "Colours (Freeform Five Remix)" - Tim Hutton - 7:06
12. "Ginger & Fred" - Voom:Voom - 6:25
13. "Galicia (Zero Db Remix)" - Trüby Trio - 5:18
14. "Toronto" - Lehner & Biebl - 3:45
15. "Tel Aviv" - Fauna Flash - 4:05
