= Dehli9 =

Studio album by Tosca
- Released: 2003
- Genre: Electronica, downtempo, ambient
- Label: G-Stone Recordings, Studio !K7
- Producer: Richard Dorfmeister, Rupert Huber

Tosca chronology
Suzuki (2000)	Dehli9 (2003)	J.A.C. (2005)

Professional ratings
Review scores
Source	Rating
Allmusic	4/5 stars
BBC	(positive)
Slant Magazine	4/5 stars

Dehli9 is the third studio album released by Austrian duo Tosca in 2003. Disc 1 contains relatively straightforward downtempo, while Disc 2 contains sparse, mostly piano music. The liner notes state "CD2 based on '12 easy to play piano pieces' by Rupert Huber."

When Richard Dorfmeister and Rupert Huber began making music together, Indian music was one of their influences, and they called themselves Dehli9. Dehli is a common alternative Hindustani pronunciation for Delhi.

== Track listing ==
=== Disc 1 ===
1. "Oscar" (vocals by Anna Clementi)
2. "Me & Yoko Ono" (vocals by Anna Clementi)
3. "Gute Laune" (vocals by Tweed)
4. "Mango di Bango"
5. "Wonderful" (vocals by Earl Zinger)
6. "Every Day & Every Night" (vocals by Sugar B.)
7. "Dave Dudley"
8. "Rolf Royce" (vocals by Stephan Graf Hadik Wildner)
9. "Sperl"
10. "La Vendeuse des Chaussures des Femmes part 1

=== Disc 2 ===
1. "d-moll"
2. "einschlaf"
3. "wien in E"
4. "schwimmer"
5. "1504 / 7"
6. "slow hell"
7. "song"
8. "romanze in es"
9. "fluß"
10. "ping"
11. "2504 / 1"
12. "piano 1"
