= Shibuya Crossing =

Scramble crossing in Tokyo

- Pedestrian scramble crossing
- World's busiest crossing World's busiest crosswalk
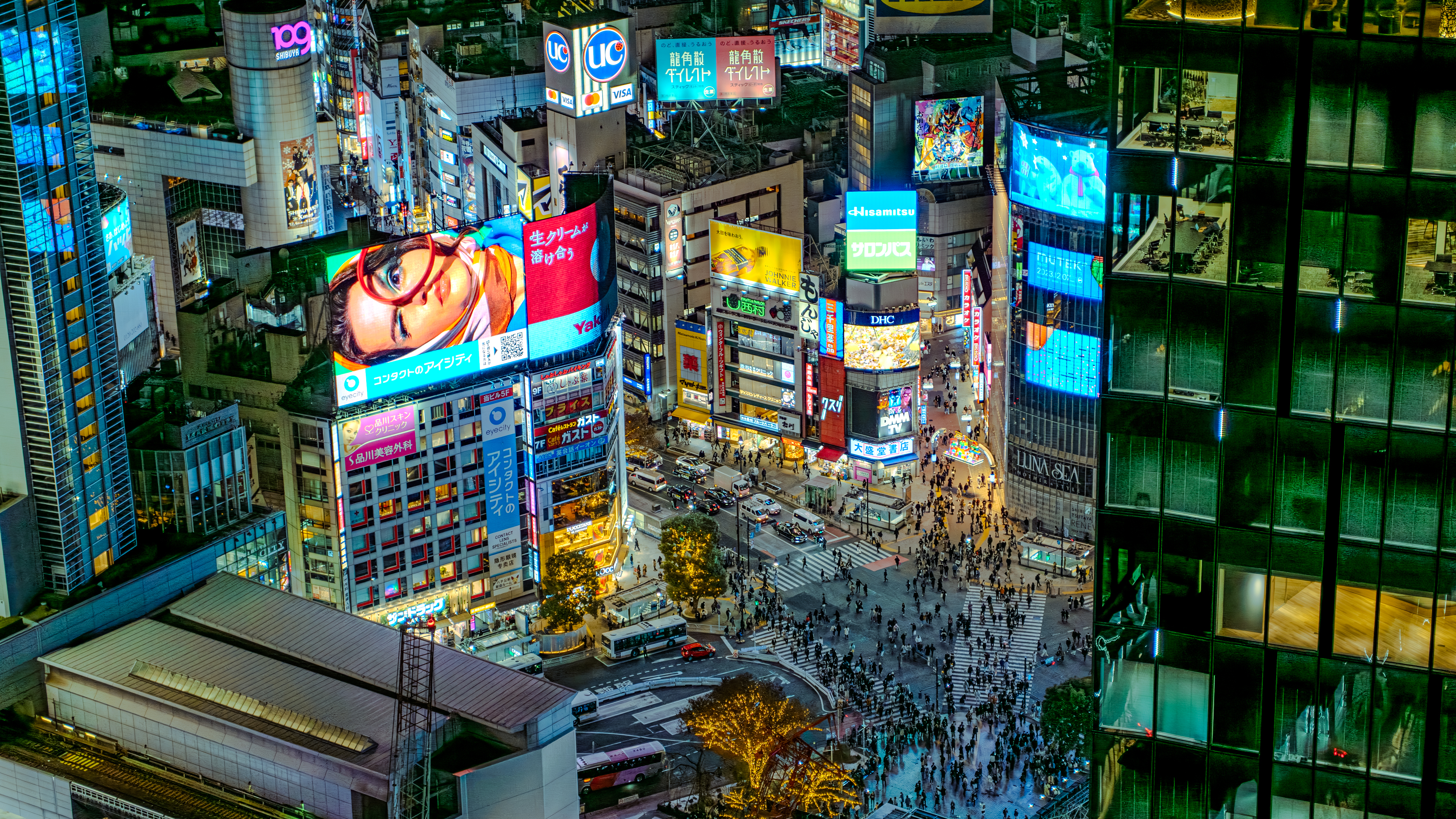
- The crossing in 2023
- Location: Shibuya, Tokyo, Japan
- Location within Japan
- Coordinates: 35°39′34″N 139°42′02″E

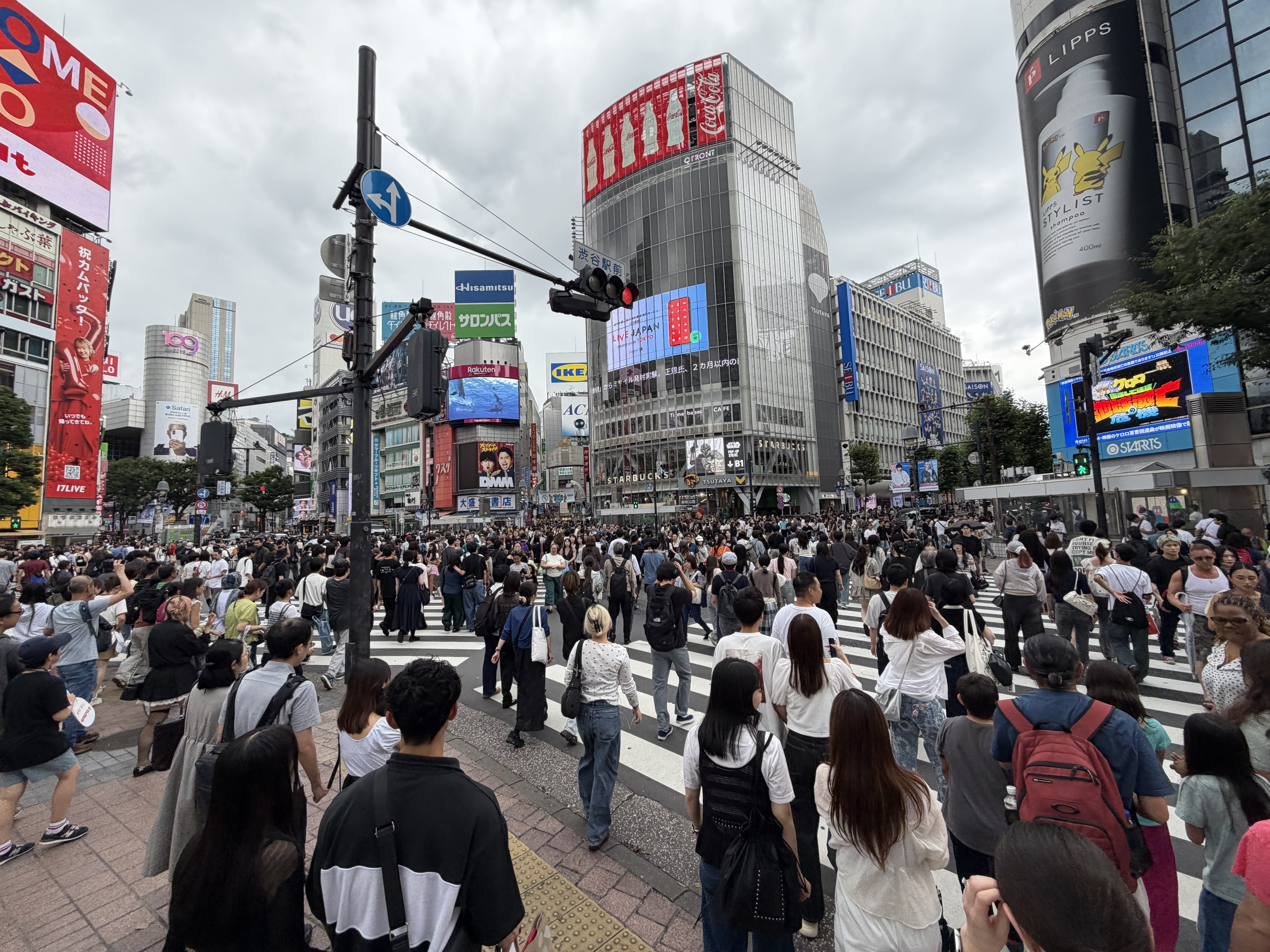
Shibuya Crossing in July 2026

Shibuya Scramble Crossing (渋谷スクランブル交差点, Shibuya sukuranburu kōsaten), commonly known as Shibuya Crossing, is a scramble crossing in Shibuya, Tokyo, Japan. It is located near Shibuya Station in Shibuya, a major commercial and entertainment district in Tokyo. It has been described as the world's busiest pedestrian crossing, with 1,000–2,000 people crossing during a single green light cycle. Inaugurated in 1973, the intersection is a popular tourist destination and a widely recognized symbol of the city of Tokyo through its frequent appearances in television, film, and other media.

== Usage ==
This intersection is frequently recognized as "the busiest pedestrian intersection in the world" with almost no loss of foot traffic at midnight or early morning. Road traffic jams rarely occur, even during rush hours. According to the Shibuya Center Street in 2016, the number of pedestrians crossing the intersection was as much as 3,000 per green light (every 2 minutes). A 2014 flow measurement survey by the Shibuya Redevelopment Association estimated around 260,000 pedestrians crossing per day on weekdays, and 390,000 pedestrians crossing on non-working days. Others estimate as many as 500,000 people on the busiest days. The 2012 SOTO Outdoor Media Survey estimated 1.5 million pedestrians per week.

== History ==
Pedestrians using the crossing in 2008

The crossing was inaugurated in 1973. It was featured in the 2016 Summer Olympics closing ceremony to promote the 2020 Summer Olympics in Tokyo.

Since the late 2010s, it has become a popular place for young people to gather at Halloween, some dressed in cosplay. Increasingly large and chaotic crowds led to Shibuya Ward adopting an ordinance in 2019 banning public alcohol consumption in the area around the end of October (Halloween) and December (New Year's Eve).

In 2023, citing issues with litter, altercations, and property damage caused by overtourism and large, unruly crowds (especially after the lifting of COVID-19 pandemic restrictions, and in the wake of the Seoul Halloween crowd crush in 2022), Shibuya Ward officials announced that it would strongly enforce measures to discourage parties on the crossing during the Halloween period, including asking residents and tourists to not gather for Halloween, traffic restrictions, and enhanced security measures to enforce the alcohol ban. Stores in the area were also requested to not sell alcohol, and some businesses closed sooner than usual.

Shibuya Crossing has also suspended New Year's Eve celebrations since 2020–21 due to safety and security issues; in 2023, alcohol consumption was restricted from 6 p.m. on 31 December to 5 a.m. on 1 January, and stores were requested to not sell alcohol during this timeframe. In addition, all video billboards were turned off at 11 p.m. rather than 12 a.m. as usual. In June 2024, an ordinance was passed to extend the public drinking ban year-round from 6 p.m. to 5 a.m. nightly.

== In popular culture ==
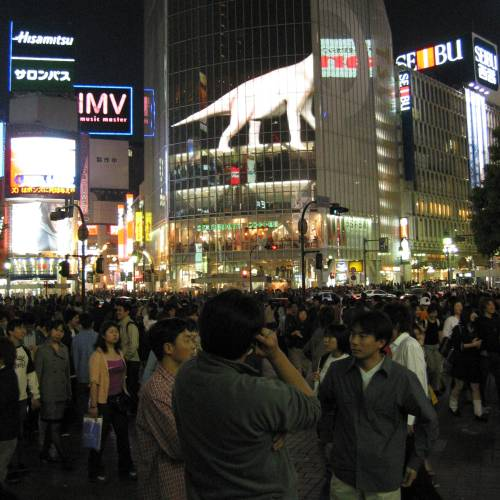
The walking dinosaur advertisement visible on the QFRONT (Tsutaya) building seen in the 2003 film Lost in Translation

Shibuya Crossing is often featured in films and television shows which take place in Tokyo, such as Lost in Translation, The Fast and the Furious: Tokyo Drift, Alice in Borderland, Jujutsu Kaisen, Resident Evil: Retribution, Sonic the Hedgehog 3, as well as on domestic and international news broadcasts. The iconic video screen featured in the above films, in particular Lost in Translation with its 'walking dinosaur' scene, was taken down for a period of time and replaced with static advertising, although it resumed operation in July 2013.

Shibuya Crossing has also been featured in many video games like Persona 5, The World Ends with You, Chaos;Head, and Forza Horizon 6.

Welsh rock band Manic Street Preachers featured the area prominently in the music video for the song "Motorcycle Emptiness" from the album Generation Terrorists in 1992. The single peaked at number 17 in the UK singles chart and was later certified silver by the British Phonographic Industry for sales of 200,000 copies.

Contemporary British painter Carl Randall (who spent 10 years living in Tokyo as an artist) depicted the area in his large artwork Shibuya, exhibited at the National Portrait Gallery in London 2013.

== See also ==
- Statue of Hachikō, located at Hachiko Square adjacent to Shibuya Crossing
