= Zabelka =

Zabelka is a surname. Notable people with the surname include:

- George Benedict Zabelka, Chaplain of the U.S. Army Air Force
- Mia Zabelka (born 1963), Austrian experimental violinist and composer
