= DJ-Kicks: Carl Craig =

Compilation album by Carl Craig
- Released: 25 March 1996
- Genre: Electronica, Detroit techno
- Length: 72:17
- Label: Studio !K7 !K7042CD (CD) !K7042LP (LP)

Carl Craig chronology
Landcruising (1995)	DJ-Kicks: Carl Craig (1996)	More Songs About Food and Revolutionary Art (1997)

DJ-Kicks chronology
C.J. Bolland (1995)	Carl Craig (1996)	Claude Young (1996)

Professional ratings
Review scores
Source	Rating
Allmusic	4/5 stars

DJ-Kicks: Carl Craig is a DJ album mixed by Carl Craig. It was released on 1996 on the Studio !K7 independent record label as part of the DJ-Kicks series.

== Track listing ==
1. Hot Lizard - The Theme (Carl Craig rmx)
2. Octagon Man - Teasing the Dragons Tail
3. Nav Katze - Crazy Dream (Réload rmx)
4. Cosmic Messenger - I2I
5. Clark - Jak to Basics
6. Designer Music - Good Girls
7. Claude Young - Changing Factors
8. Tan-Ru - Changeling
9. Auto Repeat - You Can't Stop
10. Random Generator - Zonepaging
11. Gemini - Crossing Mars
12. Neuropolitique - Switch Black
13. P.A. Presents - Res*lute
14. The 4th Wave - Electroluv
15. Dimitri & Eric Nouhan - Folkloric Acid
16. Carl Craig - DJ-KiCKS (the track)
