= J.A.C. =

Studio album by Tosca
- Released: 31 May 2005
- Label: Studio !K7

Tosca chronology
Dehli 9 (2003)	J.A.C. (2005)	No Hassle (2009)

Professional ratings
Review scores
Source	Rating
Exclaim!	(positive)
Manchester Evening News	(positive)
Metro Times	(positive)
Pitchfork	(7.0/10)
PopMatters	6/10 stars

J.A.C. is the fourth studio album by the Austrian band Tosca, which was released in 2005 on Studio !K7.

The album is named after Joshua, Arthur, and Conrad, the sons of Richard Dorfmeister and Rupert Huber, respectively.

== Track listing ==
1. "Rondo Acapricio" – 6:12
2. "Heidi Bruehl" – 4:44
3. "Superrob" – 4:18
4. "John Lee Huber" – 4:17
5. "Pyjama" – 3:52
6. "The Big Sleep" – 6:06
7. "Damentag" – 4:42
8. "Naschkatze" – 4:18
9. "Zuri" – 5:30
10. "Sala" – 8:18
11. "Forte" – 3:55
12. "No More Olives" – 5:47

== Additional personnel ==
- "Superrob" – vocals: Earl Zinger; backing vocals: Valerie Etienne
- "John Lee Huber" – vocals: Chris Eckman; backing vocals: Diana Lueger
- "The Big Sleep" – vocals: Stephan Graf Hadik Wildner
- "Damentag" – vocals: Stephan Graf Hadik Wildner
- "Naschkatze" – vocals: Farda P.
