= Kyoto Jazz Massive =

Japanese musical project

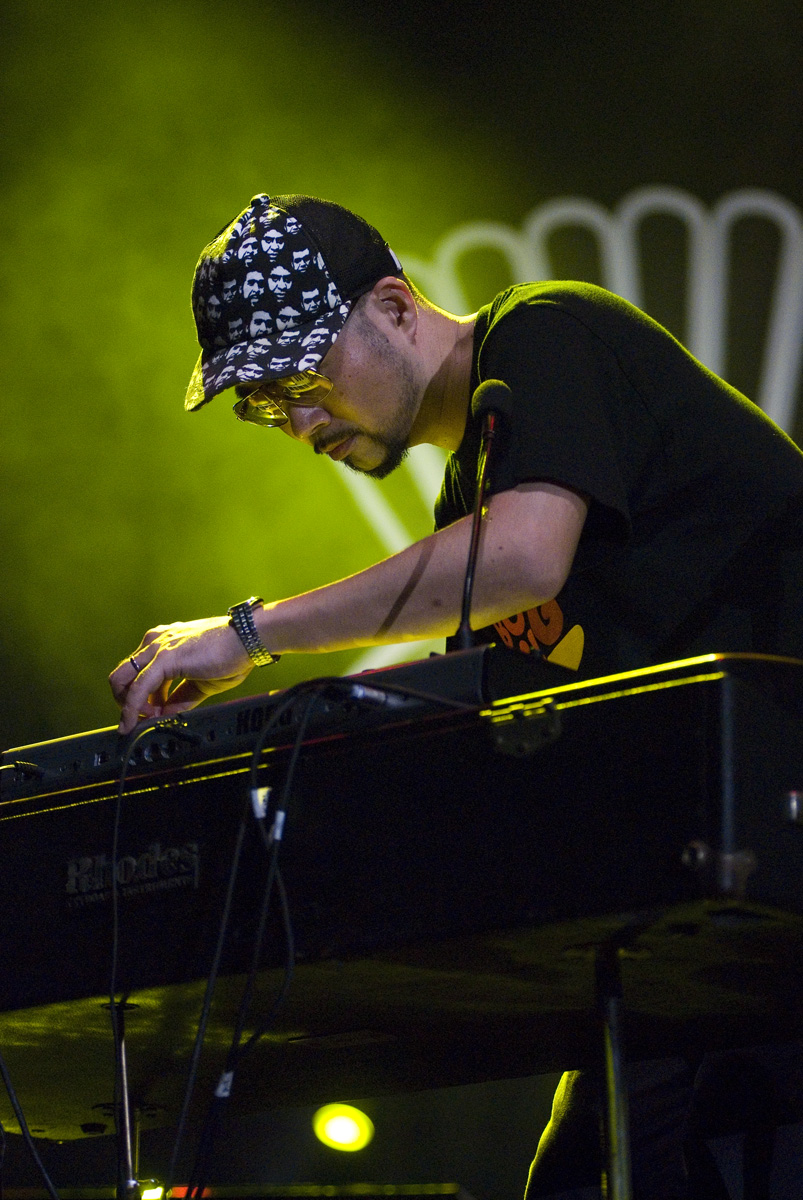
- Shuya Okino of Kyoto Jazz Massive, 2008

Background information
- Genres: Crossover jazz
- Years active: 1992–present
- Label: Compost
- Members: Shuya Okino; Yoshihiro Okino
- Website: kyotojazzmassive.com

Kyoto Jazz Massive is a Japanese musical project specialising in crossover jazz and electronic styles. The group was formed in 1992 and consists of brothers Shuya and Yoshihiro Okino. They have also included Hajime Yoshizawa, a piano producer, on a number of works. Although the brothers DJed in the late 1980s and were remixing and composing as far back as the early 1990s, they were largely popularised by the British Radio 1 DJ Gilles Peterson around 2001.

== Background ==
Brothers Shuya and Yoshihiro Okino, both DJs and remixers in Kyoto, formed the project in 1994. They released their debut, self-titled album, the same year. In 2015, to celebrate their 20-year anniversary, the duo put together a full jazz band, titled Kyoto Jazz Sextet. Their debut album, Mission, came out the same year.

Shuya Okino also runs a music venue in Shibuya, Tokyo, called the Room.

== Discography ==
=== Kyoto Jazz Massive ===
Studio albums

- Kyoto Jazz Massive (1994)
- Spirit of the Sun (2002)
- Message from a New Dawn (2021)

EPs

- Eclipse / Silent Messenger (2000)
- Kyoto Jazz Massive (2001)
- Substream (2001)
- Mind Expansions (Maxi single, 2002)

Compilations

- Spellbinder – Compiled by Kyoto Jazz Massive (1992)
- Fueled for the Future – Mixed by Kyoto Jazz Massive (2000)
- Crossbreed – A Collection of Futuristic Fusion (2000)
- Crossbreed 2 – A Collection of Futuristic Fusion (2001)
- Shibuya Jazz Classics by Kyoto Jazz Massive (2002)
- Re KJM (2004)
- For KJM (2004)
- By KJM (2005)
- 10th Anniversary (2006)
- Essence of Especial (2006)
- Quiet Wave (2006)
- So Especial (2009)
- Urbanrhythm (2012)
- Abstract Jazz Journey (2013)
- KJM Plays – Contemporary Classics (2014)
- KJM Works – Remixes & Re-edits (2014)

=== Kyoto Jazz Sextet ===
- Mission (2015)
- Unity (2017)
- Succession (2022)

== See also ==
- Japanese jazz
