= DJ-Kicks: Claude Young =

Compilation album by Claude Young
- Released: 3 June 1996
- Recorded: n/a
- Genre: Techno / Electronica
- Length: 72:40
- Label: Studio !K7 !K7045CD (CD) !K7045LP (LP)

Claude Young chronology
DJ-Kicks: Claude Young (1996)	Soft Thru (1997)

DJ-Kicks chronology
Carl Craig (1996)	Claude Young (1996)	Kruder & Dorfmeister (1996)

Professional ratings
Review scores
Source	Rating
Allmusic	4.5/5 stars

DJ-Kicks: Claude Young is a DJ mix album, mixed by Claude Young. It was released on 3 June 1996 on the Studio !K7 independent record label as part of the DJ-Kicks series.

== Track listing ==
1. Claude Young & Ian O'Brien - Joe 90
2. Maurizio - M5
3. Various Artists - *
4. Akio Milan Paak - Countach
5. Counterpoint - Jigsaw
6. Skinless Brothers - Backyard
7. Clark - Lofthouse
8. Da Sampla - With A Piece Of Ice
9. Dirty House Crew - Internal Affairs
10. Surgeon - Badger Bite
11. Random XS - Frantic Formula
12. Claude Young - Acid Wash Conflict
13. Man Made - Space Wreak
14. Ratio - Gastrek
15. Skinless Brothers - Zwung
16. Man Made - Industry
17. Dopplereffekt - Speak & Spell
18. Clark - Dial
19. Clark - Jak To Basics
20. Claude Young - DJ KiCKS (The Track)
