= DJ-Kicks: C. J. Bolland =

DJ-Kicks: C.J. Bolland

Compilation album by C.J. Bolland
- Released: 4 September 1995
- Genre: Electronic
- Label: Studio !K7 !K7038CD (CD) !K7038LP (LP)

C.J. Bolland chronology
Electronic Highway (1995)	DJ-Kicks: C.J. Bolland (1995)	The Analogue Theatre (1996)

DJ-Kicks chronology
C.J. Bolland (1995)	Carl Craig (1996)

Professional ratings
Review scores
Source	Rating
AllMusic	3/5 stars

DJ-Kicks: C.J. Bolland is a DJ mix album mixed by C.J. Bolland. It was the first album in the DJ-Kicks series, and was released on 4 September 1995 on the Studio !K7 independent record label.

== Track listing ==
1. Patrick Pulsinger - "Construction Tool"
2. Damon Wild & Tim Taylor - "Bang the Acid"
3. Joey Beltram - "Drome"
4. Magenta - "Memory Panic"
5. Bandulu - "Presence"
6. Nexus 6 - "AB-Chic"
7. B.C. - "Stronghold"
8. Manuel & Clive - "Recognised"
9. Planetary Assault Systems - "In from the Night"
10. Rotor Type - "Be Yourself"
11. Clementine - "Syn Son"
12. Sound Enforcer - "Re-Enforcement"
13. Paramatrix - "Transverse Waves"
14. Planetary Assault Systems - "Starway Ritual"
15. Phrenetic System - "Wayfarer"
