= Eddington Again =

American electronic musician

- Origin: Los Angeles, California, United States
- Genres: Electronic music; experimental pop; R&B
- Occupations: Musician, recording artist, songwriter, record producer

Eddington Again is an American electronic musician, recording artist, songwriter, and producer. Originally from Los Angeles, he was formerly based in Berlin and has now relocated back to his home city. His music incorporates elements of electronic music, experimental pop, and alternative R&B.

== Contract dispute and independent transition ==
In 2020, Eddington Again’s relationship with R&S Records ended following a contractual dispute reported by multiple music publications. Following the dispute, Eddington Again began releasing music independently, culminating in the album Naomi9 in 2023.

== Career ==
In 2023, Eddington Again released the album Naomi9 on the independent label !K7. The album was named Album of the Month by DJ Mag and received reviews from Resident Advisor and KEXP.

Naomi9 received radio airplay, including selection as Today's Top Tune on KCRW, and charted on KCRW's Top 30 Albums chart for four consecutive months.

== Reception ==
DJ Mag highlighted Naomi9 for its stylistic range, while Resident Advisor noted its blending of electronic production with pop and experimental elements.

== Discography ==
=== Studio albums ===
- Naomi9 (2023)

=== Mixtapes ===
- Masturgrape (2015)

=== Extended plays ===
- Damani3 (2020)
- Damani6 (2020)

=== Selected singles ===
- Lyft (2015)
- Sweet (2019)
- Petrify (2020)
- Blindsided (2021)
- Core 22 (2022)
- Cake Code (2023)
- Freaq (2024)
- Libra (2025)
- Instill (feat. Wandl) (2025)
- Central (2025)
