= Satta (album) =

Studio album by Boozoo Bajou
- Released: July 2001
- Genre: Downtempo, dub
- Length: 56:55
- Label: Stereo Deluxe

Boozoo Bajou album chronology
Satta (2001)	Dust My Broom (2005)

Satta is the debut album by Boozoo Bajou, the dub musical duo from Germany noted for their distinct blend of Louisiana Creole sounds with island rhythms.

== Track listing ==
All tracks are written by Florian Seyberth.

No.	Title	Length
1.	"YMA"	6:30
2.	"Camioux"	5:32
3.	"Night Over Manaus"	6:19
4.	"Divers"	5:02
5.	"Bakar"	5:14
6.	"Down & Out"	6:06
7.	"Yoruba Road" (Written by Peter Heider and Tony Allen)	5:40
8.	"Under My Sensi"	6:01
9.	"Lava"	4:51
10.	"Satta"	5:42
Total length:		57:09
