= Peace Orchestra: Reset =

Remix album by Peter Kruder
- Released: 17 June 2002
- Genre: Electronic, trip hop, downtempo
- Length: 1:13:22
- Label: G-Stone Recordings; Studio !K7 (!K7125CD)
- Producer: Peter Kruder

Peter Kruder chronology
Peace Orchestra (1999)	Peace Orchestra: Reset (2002)

Professional ratings
Review scores
Source	Rating
AllMusic	4/5 stars

Peace Orchestra: Reset is a remix album of the Peace Orchestra, featuring remixes by artists such as Gotan Project and Trüby Trio, released by Studio !K7 in 2002.

== Track listing ==
1. "The Man (Gotan Project El hombre de la pampa Mix)" – 7:17
2. "Meister Petz (Beanfield Remix)" – 6:35
3. "Double Drums (DJ DSL Remix)" – 5:29
4. "Domination (Raw Deal Remix)" – 6:53
5. "Marakesch (Meitz Remix)" – 6:29
6. "Henry (Zero db Remix)" – 7:45
7. "Domination (Guillaume Boulard Remix)" – 5:26
8. "Who Am I (Château Flight Remix)" – 4:50
9. "Henry (Soulpatrol Remix)" – 6:36
10. "Shining (Trüby Trio Treatment)" – 6:47
11. "The Man (Kosma Deep Gratitude Interpretation)" – 9:24
