= Impulsive! Revolutionary Jazz Reworked =

Compilation album by various artists
- Released: 25 October 2005
- Genre: Jazz
- Length: 51:52
- Label: Impulse!

Impulsive! Revolutionary Jazz Reworked ratings
Review scores
Source	Rating
All About Jazz (John Kelman)	4/5 stars
All About Jazz (Troy Collins)	3/5 stars
AllMusic	3.5/5 stars
Now	4/5
PopMatters	7/10

Impulsive! Revolutionary Jazz Reworked is a compilation of music originally released on Impulse! Records, remixed by contemporary hip-hop and electronic musicians and released in 2005 on CD and LP for the same label.

== Track listing ==
#	Song	Artist	Remixed version	Time
1	"A Helluva Town"	George Russell	Sa-Ra "Go" Remix	4:18
2	"II BS"	Charles Mingus	RZA's Mingus Bounce Mix	3:22
3	"El Toro"	Chico Hamilton	Mark De Clive-Lowe Remix	5:29
4	"Mizrab"	Gabor Szabo	Prefuse 73	4:17
5	"Swing Low, Sweet Cadillac"	Dizzy Gillespie	Gerardo Frisina Extended Remix	6:17
6	"Spanish Rice"	Clark Terry & Chico O'Farrill	DJ Dolores Extended Remix	4:50
7	"Attica Blues"	Archie Shepp	Chief Xcel (Of Blackalicious) Remix	3:51
8	"Astral Traveling"	Pharoah Sanders	Boozoo Bajou Remix	3:22
9	"Bamboo Flute Blues"	Yusef Lateef	Kid Koala Remix	5:46
10	"Stolen Moments"	Oliver Nelson	Telefon Tel Aviv Remix	5:29
11	"At Night (A Poem)"	John Coltrane	Ravi Coltrane w/Julie Patton	4:51
