= DJ-Kicks: Kruder & Dorfmeister =

Compilation album by Kruder & Dorfmeister
- Released: 19 August 1996
- Genre: Jazzstep; downtempo; trip hop; drum and bass; jungle; electronica; breakbeat
- Length: 1:12:45
- Label: G-Stone Recordings; Studio !K7 !K7046CD (CD) !K7046LP (LP)
- Producer: Kruder & Dorfmeister

Kruder & Dorfmeister chronology
G-Stoned (1996)	DJ-Kicks: Kruder & Dorfmeister (1996)	The K & D Sessions (1998)

DJ-Kicks chronology
Claude Young (1996)	Kruder & Dorfmeister (1996)	Stacey Pullen (1996)

Professional ratings
Review scores
Source	Rating
AllMusic	4.5/5 stars

DJ-Kicks: Kruder & Dorfmeister is a DJ mix album, mixed by Kruder & Dorfmeister. It was released on 19 August 1996 on the Studio !K7 independent record label as part of the DJ-Kicks series. It features a mix of trip hop and jazzstep tracks.

== Track listing ==
1. The Herbaliser - A Mother
2. Small World - Livin' Free
3. Tango - Spellbound
4. The Lab Rats - Give My Soul
5. Statik Sound System - Revolutionary Pilot
6. JMJ & Flytronix - In Too Deep
7. Aquasky - Kauna
8. James Bong - Never Say?
9. Hardfloor pres. Dadamnphreaknoizphunk? - Dubdope
10. Thievery Corporation - Shaolin Satellite
11. Kruder & Dorfmeister - High Noon
12. Beanfield - Keep On Believing
13. Sapien - Que Dolor
14. Shantel - Bass and Several Cars
15. Karma - Look Up Dere
16. Showroom Recordings - Radio Burning Chrome
17. Kruder & Dorfmeister - Black Baby (DJ-Kicks)

== Charts ==
Chart performance for DJ-Kicks: Kruder & Dorfmeister
Chart (2000–2026)	Peak position
UK Compilation Albums (OCC)	49
UK Dance Albums (OCC)	2
UK Independent Albums (OCC)	38

== Sales ==
Region	Certification	Certified units/sales
United States	—	6,000
Summaries
Europe	—	250,000
