= Kruder & Dorfmeister =

Austrian electronic music duo

- Origin: Vienna, Austria
- Genres: Electronic, trip hop, electronica, jazzstep, downtempo, nu jazz, breakbeat,
- Years active: 1993–2013, 2020–present
- Label: G Stone Recordings
- Members: Peter Kruder; Richard Dorfmeister

Kruder & Dorfmeister, named after members Peter Kruder and Richard Dorfmeister, is an Austrian duo, known for their trip hop/downtempo remixes of pop, hip hop and drum and bass songs.

== Career ==
In 1993, they released their first EP G-Stoned featuring the hypnotic "High Noon" and a cover resembling Simon & Garfunkel's Bookends to critical acclaim especially from the UK. Gilles Peterson played the track at first on his BBC show Worldwide.

In 2007, the duo were commissioned by Nokia to create a set of ringtones and sounds for its luxury Nokia 8800 Arte and Nokia 8800 Sapphire Arte phones.

2010 marked the 16th anniversary of Kruder & Dorfmeister and their record label G-Stone Recordings which resulted in the release of the Sixteen F**king Years Of G-Stone Recordings compilation and the development of the K&D Sessions Live show. The show included visuals by longtime G-Stone VJ collaborator Fritz Fitzke and MC performances by Earl Zinger and MC Ras T-Weed. With performances at The Big Chill, Berlin Festival and other large festivals, the K&D Sessions Live show became successful and a world tour ensued.

== Discography ==
- 1993 – G-Stoned (EP, G-Stone Recordings)
- 1996 – Conversions: A K&D Selection (DJ mix, Spray Records/Shadow Records)
- 1996 – DJ-Kicks: Kruder & Dorfmeister (DJ mix, Studio !K7)
- 1996 – Black Baby (EP, !K7)
- 1998 – The K&D Sessions (DJ mix, !K7)
- 2002 – G-Stone Book (Label compilation)
- 2008 – Shakatakadoodub (EP, G-Stone, online only)
- 2010 – Sixteen F**king Years Of G-Stone Recordings (Label compilation)
- 2013 – Akte Grüninger, sound by Richard Dorfmeister
- 2020 – Johnson
- 2020 – 1995

== Aliases ==
- Tosca (Dorfmeister with Rupert Huber)

- Discography

- Peace Orchestra (Kruder)

- 1999 – Peace Orchestra (G-Stone)
- 2002 – Reset (G-Stone/Studio !K7)

- Richard Dorfmeister vs. Madrid de los Austrias (Heinz Tronigger & Michael "Pogo" Kreiner)

- 2004 – Valldemossa (Sunshine Enterprises)
- 2006 – "Boogie No More" (EP, Net's Work International)
- 2006 – Grand Slam (G-Stone)
- 2006 – "Valldemossa Remixed" (EP, Sunshine Enterprises)

- Voom:Voom (Kruder with Christian Prommer and Roland Appel)

- 2000 – "Poppen / Influenza" (EP, Compost Records)
- 2001 – "Ginger & Fred / Influenza Forte" (EP, Compost)
- 2003 – "Baby 3" (EP, Compost)
- 2006 – PengPeng (Studio !K7)

== See also ==
- List of Austrians in music
