= Conversions: A K&D Selection =

Compilation album by Kruder & Dorfmeister
- Released: 17 February 1996
- Genre: Drum and bass
- Label: BMG Records; Spray Records; Shadow Records
- Producer: Kruder & Dorfmeister

Kruder & Dorfmeister chronology
Conversions: A K&D Selection (1996)	G-Stoned (1996)

Professional ratings
Review scores
Source	Rating
AllMusic	3/5 stars
The New Rolling Stone Album Guide	2/5 stars

Conversions: A K&D Selection is a DJ mix album, mixed by Kruder & Dorfmeister. It was released on 16 February 1996 on Shadow Records.

== Track listing ==
1. "Dat's Cool" - DJ Unknown Face – 6:15
2. "Searchin'" - Dead Calm – 7:44
3. "Come On (Simon Templar Remix)" - The Ballistic Brothers – 4:58
4. "Nu Birth of Cool" - Omni Trio – 5:45
5. "One and Only" - PFM – 9:20
6. "Find Me" - Skanna – 4:49
7. "Speechless Drum & Bass" - Count Basic – 6:50
8. "Visible From Space (Aquasky Remix)" - Hunch – 5:53
9. "Time Zone" - Space Link – 5:29
10. "The Lick" - Earl Grey – 6:33
