= Grains (Boozoo Bajou album) =

Studio album by Boozoo Bajou
- Released: February 24, 2009
- Studio: Purecuts
- Genre: Downtempo, lounge
- Length: 59:33
- Language: English
- Label: !K7

Boozoo Bajou album chronology
Dust My Broom (2005)	Grains (2009)	4 (2014)

Professional ratings
Review scores
Source	Rating
AllMusic	3.5/5 stars
PopMatters	6/10

Grains is the third studio album by German musical duo Boozoo Bajou, released on February 24, 2009, under the !K7 record label. Members Florian and Peter were inspired by the resurgence in acoustic singer-songwriters, and a visit to the contemporary folk festival Green Man. They made ‘Grains’ after falling in love with the Laurel Canyon generation of early 1970s Los Angeles. This was a time of unplugged introspection for rock superstars like Neil Young, Joni Mitchell and Jackson Browne.

== Track listing ==
No.	Title	Length
1.	"Flickers"	4:12
2.	"Sign"	4:38
3.	"Big Nick's"	5:04
4.	"Same Sun"	5:47
5.	"Grains"	6:17
6.	"Fuersattel"	5:13
7.	"Heavy On Me"	6:45
8.	"Kinder Ohne Strom"	5:37
9.	"Tonschraube"	5:46
10.	"Messengers"	4:55
11.	"Nebelkloster"	5:19
Total length:		59:33
