= Peace Orchestra (album) =

Studio album by Peace Orchestra
- Released: 24 August 1999
- Genre: Electronic, trip hop, downtempo
- Length: 57:17
- Label: G-Stone Recordings (G-CD 004)
- Producer: Peter Kruder

Peace Orchestra chronology
Peace Orchestra (1999)	Peace Orchestra: Reset (2002)

Professional ratings
Review scores
Source	Rating
AllMusic	4.5/5 stars
Pitchfork Media	(8.1/10)

Peace Orchestra is an album recorded by Peter Kruder under the Peace Orchestra banner. The album's most well-known track "Who Am I" received a great deal of exposure through its use throughout The Wachowskis' project The Animatrix. It was later featured on the soundtrack album to the 2001 Christopher Nolan film Memento and in the film Stay by Marc Forster.

== Track listing ==
1. "The Man (Part One)" – 4:45
2. "Meister Petz" – 6:16
3. "Double Drums" – 9:22
4. "Domination" – 8:35
5. "Marakesh" – 6:55
6. "Henry" – 6:05
7. "Who Am I" – 5:57
  - also appears on The Animatrix soundtrack, as "Who Am I (Animatrix Edit)"
8. "Shining (Featuring Chilli Bukasa)" – 5:01
9. "The Man (Part Two)" – 4:21
