= Mia Zabelka =

Austrian experimental violinist and composer (born 1963)

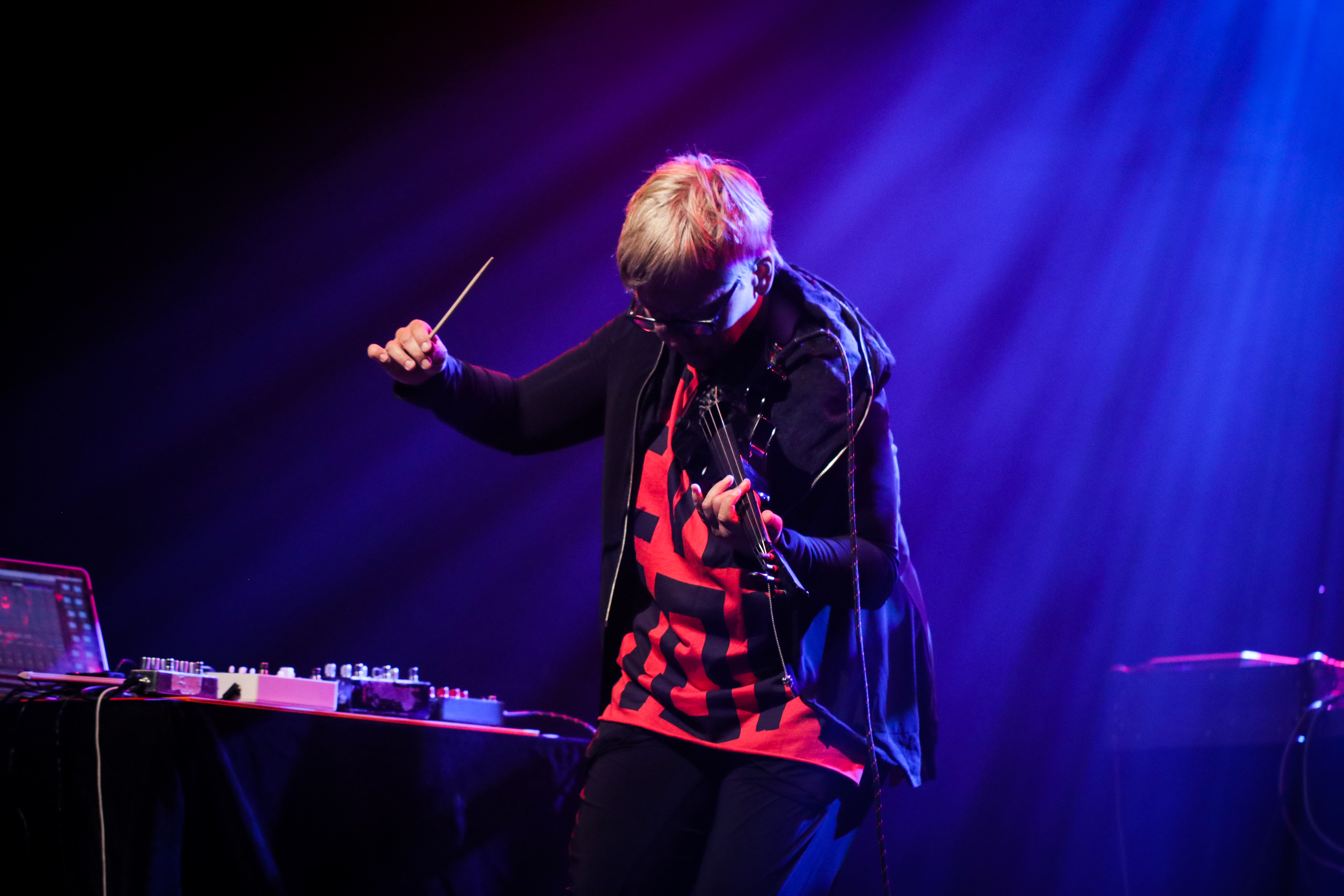
Mia Zabelka performing with electric violin and live electronics in 2018

Mia Zabelka (born 1963 in Vienna) is an Austrian violinist, composer, improviser and sound artist. Her work encompasses experimental music, free improvisation and electroacoustic music, incorporating extended violin techniques and live electronics. She studied violin at the Vienna Conservatory and composition and electroacoustic music at the University of Music and Performing Arts Vienna. Her performances explore the relationship between the body, gesture, sound and space.

Zabelka has collaborated with musicians including Pauline Oliveros and Alvin Curran. Alongside her work as a performer and composer, she co-founded the Klanghaus sound art centre in southern Styria and has served as artistic director of the Vienna-based experimental music festival phonofemme since 2009. In 2021, she received the Austrian Art Prize in the music category.

== Collaborations ==
Mia Zabelka played a.o. with John Zorn, Ensemble Zeitkratzer, Pauline Oliveros and Alvin Curran.

In December 2005, Zabelka collaborated with Rupert Huber on Happy Birthday Ars Sonora, a live multichannel radio performance marking the twentieth anniversary of the Spanish radio programme Ars Sonora. Performed at the ORF Funkhaus in Vienna, the work featured Zabelka on electric violin and Huber on synthesizer and samples, and was broadcast as part of the programme's anniversary celebrations.

== Compositions ==
Compositions of her got commissioned by a.o. Foundation Academy of Arts in Berlin, Ars Electronica, Wien Modern, Steirischer Herbst, New Music America, The Kitchen, and "Wiener Festwochen".

== Cultural work ==
Additional she workes as curator and artistic director for contemporary music and art festivals besides her own artistic work and concert travels.In 2007 she founded Klanghaus, a center for sound art and interdisciplinary art in Southern Styria, which organizes the Klangzeit festival four times a year. Since 2009 she has been the artistic director of phonofemme Vienna, an international festival in the field of experimental music and sound art by women. In 2015 she became President of SFIEMA. Mia Zabelka has been Vice President of the Austrian Composers' Association (ACOM) since 2019.

== Awards ==
After scholarships from a.o. DAAD (Germany) and the Fulbright commission (USA) she received a.o. the Ars Electronica (Austria) recognition award. In 2021, Mia Zabelka was awarded the Austrian Art Prize in the category ‘Music’ by the Federal Ministry for Arts, Culture, Civil Service and Sport.

== Discography ==
=== Selected releases ===
- 2024: The Confidence of One Swimming Against the Current – with Tungu and Stefan Strasser (FMR Records).
- 2021: The Quantum Violin – with Glen Hall (FMR Records).
- 2021: Aftershock Vol. 1 – with Icostech (Subcontinental Records).
- 2020: Myasmo (Setola di Maiale).
- 2020: Thinking Light – with Kai Niggemann as Redshift Orchestra (digital EP, WAF80 music; originally released in 2016).
- 2019: Pleasure-Voltage – with Benjamin Finger and James Plotkin (Karlrecords).
- 2019: Live at Rewire 2018 – with Benjamin Finger and John Hegre (Never Anything Records).
- 2019: From Invisible Landscapes – with Zahra Mani (EP, Small Forms).
- 2018: W – with Maggie Nicols and John Russell as Trio Blurb (Evil Rabbit Records).
- 2017: Cellular Resonance (Little Crackd Rabbit).
- 2016: Dans les tiroirs – with Carlos Zingaro and Jean-Marc Foussat (Small Forms).
- 2016: The Honey Pump – with Nicola L. Hein (FMR Records).
- 2015: Monday Sessions (Creative Sources Recordings).
- 2013: Trio Blurb – with Maggie Nicols and John Russell (Extraplatte).
- 2012: Weird Tales & Elegant Motion – Mia Zabelka Trio with Johannes Frisch and Pavel Fajt (Monotype Records).
- 2011: M (Monotype Records).

=== Guest appearances ===
- 2014: It Doesn't Belong Here – Micromelancolié (Zoharum); violin on the title track.
