= Tosca (band) =

Austrian music group

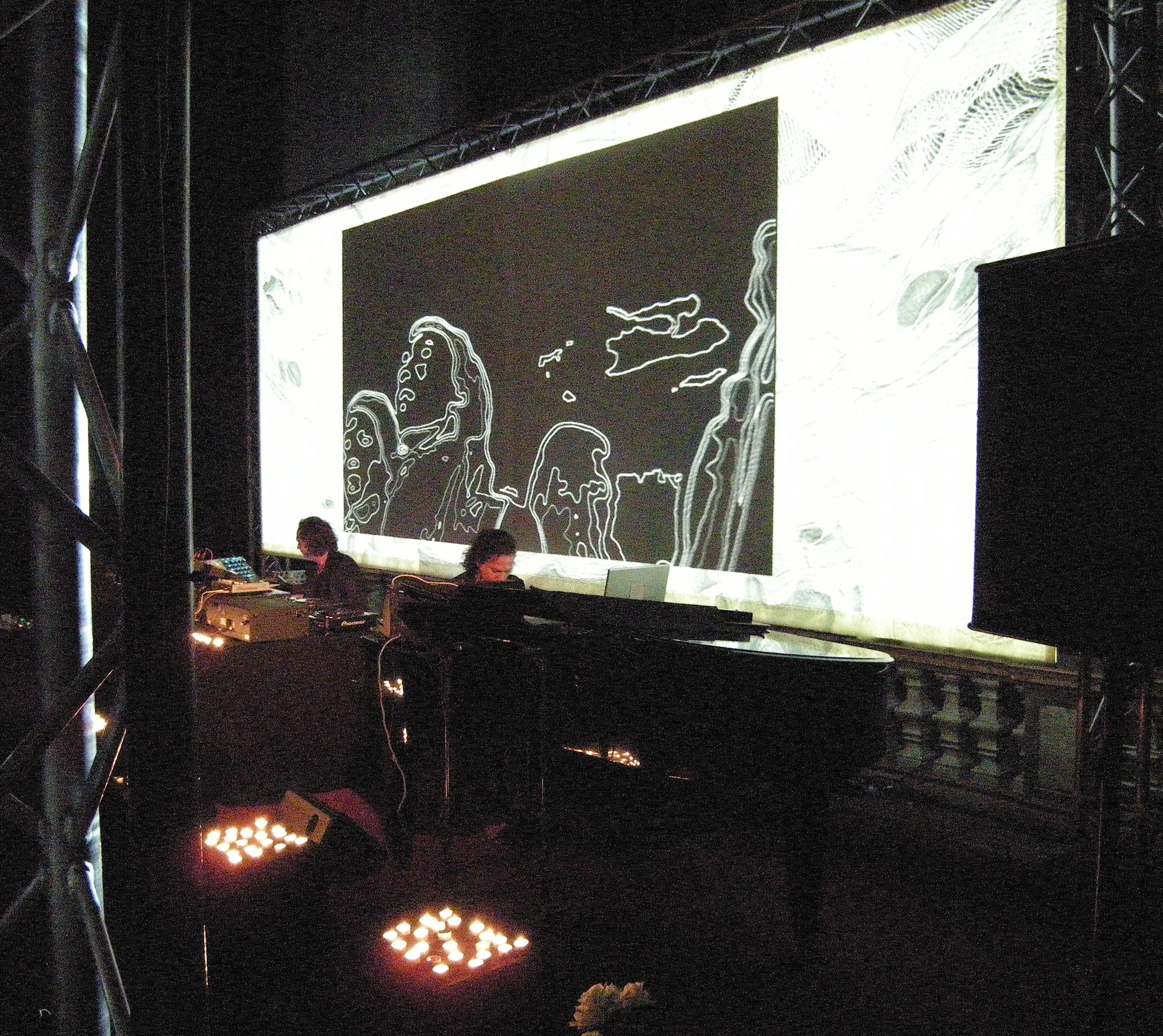
- Tosca (band) - Performing 'No Hassle' at Minoritenkirche, Vienna. 2009

Background information
- Origin: Vienna, Austria
- Genres: Electronica, downtempo, chillout, experimental music, ambient techno, trip hop
- Years active: 1994–present
- Labels: Studio !K7, G Stone Recordings
- Members: Richard Dorfmeister; Rupert Huber
- Website: www.toscamusic.com

Tosca are an Austrian music group consisting of Richard Dorfmeister and Rupert Huber. This is Dorfmeister's second such project, the first being Kruder & Dorfmeister. Tosca's first album, Opera, was released in 1997 by G-Stone Recordings.

== History ==
Richard Dorfmeister and Rupert Huber first met in school, and began experimenting with tape machines, Indian music, and poetry lyrics, under the name of Dehli9. After school, Dorfmeister and Huber went their separate ways: Dorfmeister began producing and DJing with Peter Kruder, and Huber worked in the experimental music scene. His compositions were featured by Wiener Festwochen (Private Exile, 2004), Centre Pompidou (Sonic Process, 2002) and Ars Electronica (Radiotopia, 2002) as well as in TV series (C.S.I.: Miami, Sex and the City) and radio (signations for the ORF – Austrian Broadcasting Company).

In 1994, Dorfmeister and Huber released their first 12", entitled "Chocolate Elvis", on Kruder and Dorfmeister's G-Stone label. A string of critically acclaimed albums and remix collections followed – Opera (1996), Suzuki (2000), Dehli9 (2003) J.A.C. (2005) and No Hassle (2009) are considered milestones of the downtempo genre. The musical trademark of Tosca is a cheerful laid-back feel that emanates a warm, sexy, and occasionally melancholic atmosphere.

Their singles and its remixes were released as remix albums – i.e. Souvenirs – The J.A.C. Remixes, Suzuki in Dub, Chocolate Elvis Dubs or the Fuck Dub remix collection – and featured on countless compilations. Tosca has performed in live shows in the US, South America and Europe, including such prominent festivals as Coachella (Palm Springs, USA) and the Ars Electronica Festival (Linz, Austria). In 2001, Tosca was honored with Austria's Amadeus Music Award as best Pop/Rock group. In 2009 the release of No Hassle saw Tosca move into more ambient soundscapes and the world of live instrumentation. In 2013 their sixth studio album Odeon featuring vocalists Sarah Callier, Rodney Hunter and JJ Jones was released on their longtime home of !K7 Records.

== Discography ==
=== Studio albums ===
- Opera (1997)
- Suzuki (2000)
- Dehli9 (2003)
- J.A.C. (2005)
- No Hassle (2009)
- Odeon (2013)
- Outta Here (2014)
- Going Going Going (2017)
- Osam (2022)

=== Remix albums ===
- Fuck Dub Remixes (1997)
- Chocolate Elvis Dubs (1999)
- Suzuki in Dub (2000)
- Different Tastes of Honey (2001)
- Souvenirs (2006)
- Pony (No Hassle Versions) (2010)
- Tlapa: The Odeon Remixes (2013)
- Shopsca: The Outta Here versions (2015)
- Boom Boom Boom: The Going Going Going Remixes (2018)
- Mirage (The Osam Remixes) (2023)

=== Singles and EPs ===
- 1994 – Chocolate Elvis (G-Stone Recordings)
- 1995 – Favourite Chocolate (G-Stone Recordings)
- 1996 – Fuck Dub (G-Stone Recordings)
- 1997 – Buona Sarah (G-Stone Recordings)
- 1997 – Fuck Dub Remixes Vol. 1–3 (G-Stone Recordings)
- 1999 – Chicken Chiefly / Chocolate Elvis Dub (Pork Recordings)
- 1999 – Chocolate Elvis (G-Stone Recordings)
- 1999 – Suzuki EP (G-Stone Recordings)
- 2003 – Wonderful (Studio !K7)
- 2005 – Damentag (Studio !K7)
- 2005 – Heidi Bruehl (Studio !K7)
- 2006 – Souvenirs EP (G-Stone Recordings)

== Chart positions ==
Year	Title	Chart positions						
Year	Title	AUT	FRA	GER	NL	NZ	SWI	US
2000	Suzuki	24	–	48	–	29	–	–
2002	Different Tastes of Honey	47	–	–	–	–	–	–
2003	Dehli 9	14	64	59	78	–	97	8
2005	J.A.C.	28	130	92	–	–	–	12
2009	No Hassle	27	–	81	–	–	–	–
2013	Odeon	38	–	–	–	–	–	–
2017	Going Going Going	68	–	–	–	–	91	–

== Music awards ==
- 2004: Amadeus Austrian Music Award-Nominating National Rock/Pop Group
- 2001: Amadeus Austrian Music Award-Nominating National Rock/Pop Group
