= Peter Grain =

Peter Grain may refer to:

- Peter Grain (artist) (1785–1857), French-American artist
- Sir Peter Grain (judge) (1864–1947), British extraterritorial judge
