= G-Stoned =

Extended play by Kruder & Dorfmeister

EP by Kruder & Dorfmeister
- Released: 1993 (Austria); 1994 (US); 1995 (UK)
- Recorded: September – October 1993
- Genre: Trip hop, electronica, downtempo
- Length: 24:05
- Label: Quango
- Producer: Peter Kruder, Richard Dorfmeister

Kruder & Dorfmeister chronology
Conversions: A K&D Selection (1996)	G-Stoned (1993)	DJ-Kicks: Kruder & Dorfmeister (1996)

Professional ratings
Review scores
Source	Rating
Allmusic	4/5 stars

G-Stoned is an EP released by Austrian duo Kruder & Dorfmeister.

== Album cover ==
The cover of G-Stoned features a black and white photograph of the duo in specific poses and arrangement and sans-serif title lettering – in a manner that reenacts the cover of Simon & Garfunkel's Bookends.

== Track listing ==
1. "Definition" – 5:09
2. "Deep Shit (Pt. 1 and 2)" – 6:22
3. "High Noon" – 6:26
4. "Original Bedroom Rockers" – 6:07

== Liner notes ==
- All instruments, writing, production – Kruder & Dorfmeister
- Artwork by – Oka
- Other (Musical Doping) – Kloss, Schatzl, Weber
- Photography – Heller

Cut 1: Recorded at TIC Music Studios || Cut 2: Recorded at GStone Studio One || Cuts 3 & 4: Recorded at GStone Studio One & Two.
