= Count Basic =

Austrian band

Count Basic is an Austrian band who play a variety of R&B, trip hop, acid jazz and smooth jazz music. The band's principal members were guitarist Peter Legat and the two vocalists Kelli Sae and Valerie Etienne but the band decided to go on only with Kelli Sae after their first album.

== Discography ==
- 1995: Life Think It Over (Instinct Records EX-310)
- 1996: Movin' In The Right Direction (Instinct EX-328)
- 1996: The Remix Hit Collection (Spray Records [EU] 743213970622)
- 1997: Count Basic Live (Instinct EX-363)
- 1999: Trust Your Instincts (Instinct INS-511)
- 2001: More Than The Best (Instinct INS-555)
- 2002: Bigger & Brighter (Spray [EU] 743219376121)
- 2004: First Decade 1994–2004 (BMG [EU] 828766077421)
- 2007: Love & Light (EmArcy/Universal [EU] 602517404885)
- 2014: Sweet Spot (Universal [EU] 6025 37905386)
- 2022: Studio Live Session (LoEnd Records [EU] V132) Limited Edition LP release only
