= Voom:Voom =

Austrian electronic music group

- Origin: Austria
- Genres: Electronic music
- Years active: 2006–present
- Labels: Compost Records, Studio !K7, G-Stone Recordings
- Members: Peter Kruder; Christian Prommer; Roland Appel

Voom:Voom was an Austrian electronic music project by Ronald Appel, Christian Prommer, and Peter Kruder.

Their only full-length album, PengPeng, was released on April 24, 2006, on Studio !K7 records. They had previously released four EPs.
