= Shibuya (district) =

District in Tokyo, Japan

Shibuya 渋谷
- District
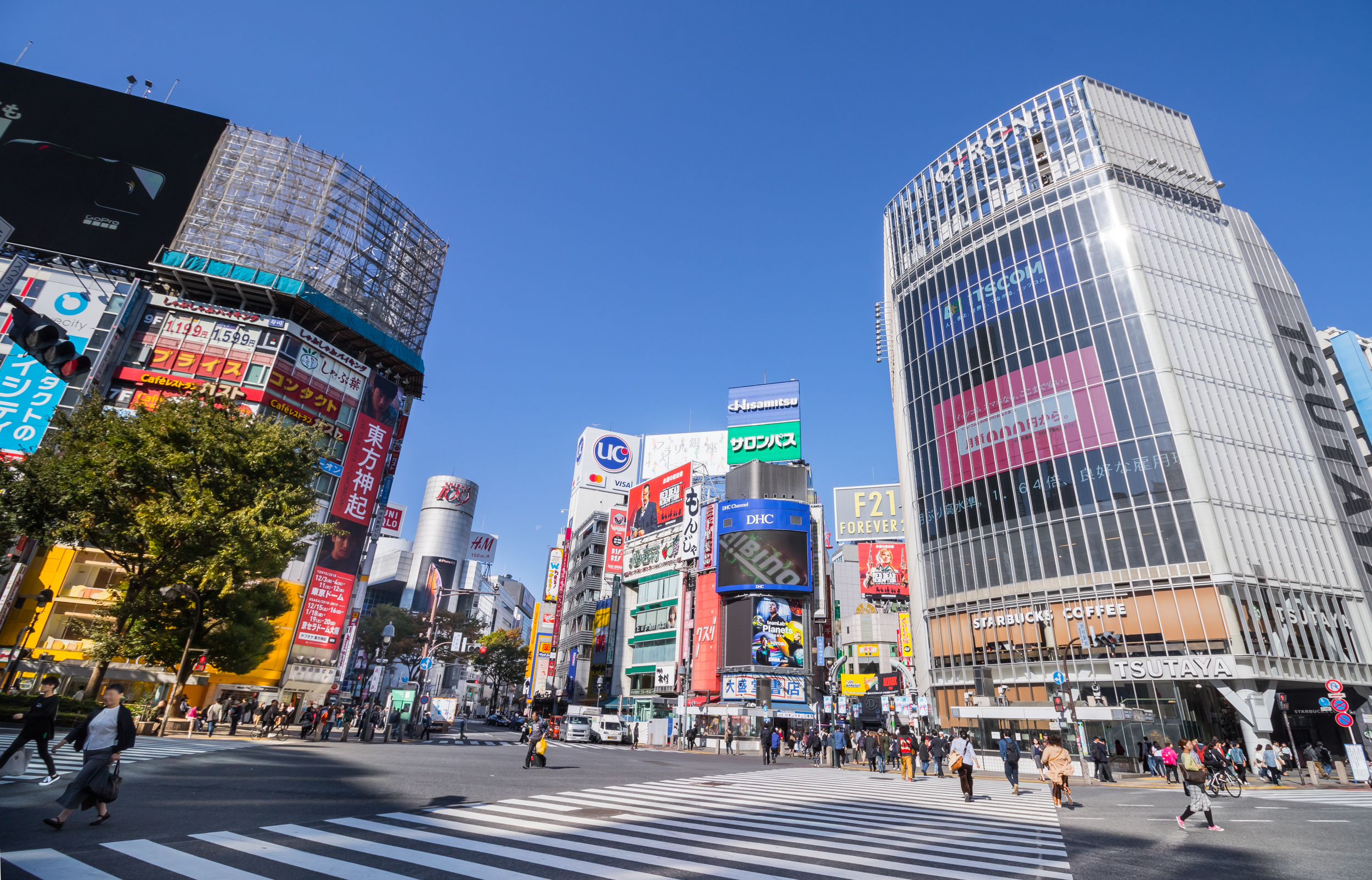

- Location within Tokyo
- Coordinates: 35°39′35.46″N 139°42′10.52″E
- Country: Japan
- City: Tokyo
- Ward: Shibuya

Population (December 1, 2017)
  - Total: 4,160
- Time zone: UTC+9 (JST)
- Postal code: 150-0002
- Area code: 03

Shibuya (渋谷) is the namesake district of the ward of Shibuya, Tokyo, Japan. It is located in the southwest of central Tokyo on the east side of Shibuya Station. With numerous shops, offices and public facilities, it is one of the three large sub-centers (fuku-toshin) in western Tokyo alongside Shinjuku and Ikebukuro. It is divided into four numbered quarters, chôme, in which had total of 4,160 inhabitants in 2017. Colloquially, the districts to the west of the train station (Sakuragaokachō, Dōgenzaka, Udagawachō) known as the nightlife district are also counted as Shibuya.

== Education ==
Shibuya Board of Education operates public elementary and junior high schools.

Shibuya 1-chōme, 2-chōme 13-24 ban, and 3-chōme 4-11, 16-23, and 27-29 ban are zoned to Jinnan Elementary School (神南小学校) and Shoto Junior High School (松濤中学校). Shibuya 2-chōme 1-12 ban, Shibuya 3-chōme 1-3, 12-15, and 24-26 ban, and Shibuya 4-chōme are zoned to Tokiwamatsu Elementary School (常磐松小学校) and Hachiyama Junior High School (鉢山中学校).
