= Compost Records =

German record label

- Founded: 1993
- Founder: Michael Reinboth
- Distributor(s): Shelter Music Group
- Genre: Downtempo; nu jazz; bossa nova; drum and bass
- Country of origin: Germany
- Location: Munich
- Official website: compost-rec.com

Compost Records is a German record label based in Munich and established by Michael Reinboth in 1993. The label is known for progressive downbeat dance and nu jazz releases incorporating influences of bossa nova, techno, and drum and bass. The Future Sounds of Jazz compilation series helped establish the label early in its history. The majority of artists signed to Compost Records are those known to Reinboth personally, from connections in the German downbeat club scene. The company has resisted licensing its catalog to larger labels, seeking instead to develop roster reputations in-house. Reinboth selected the name Compost for his label because it translates well among many languages, and felt it denoted a "catalyst for constitution and reactions".

In the United States, Compost was initially distributed by K7! Distribution and then by Studio Distribution, until 2002, when it switched to Shelter Music Group.

The book Soul Love: 20 Years Compost Records was released in 2015, featuring text in both English and German, over 450 photographs from the history of the label, and a download code for a forty-track compilation.

== Artist roster ==
- Jazzanova
- Koop
- Kyoto Jazz Massive
- Trüby Trio
