= Rupert Huber (composer) =

Austrian composer and musician (born 1967)

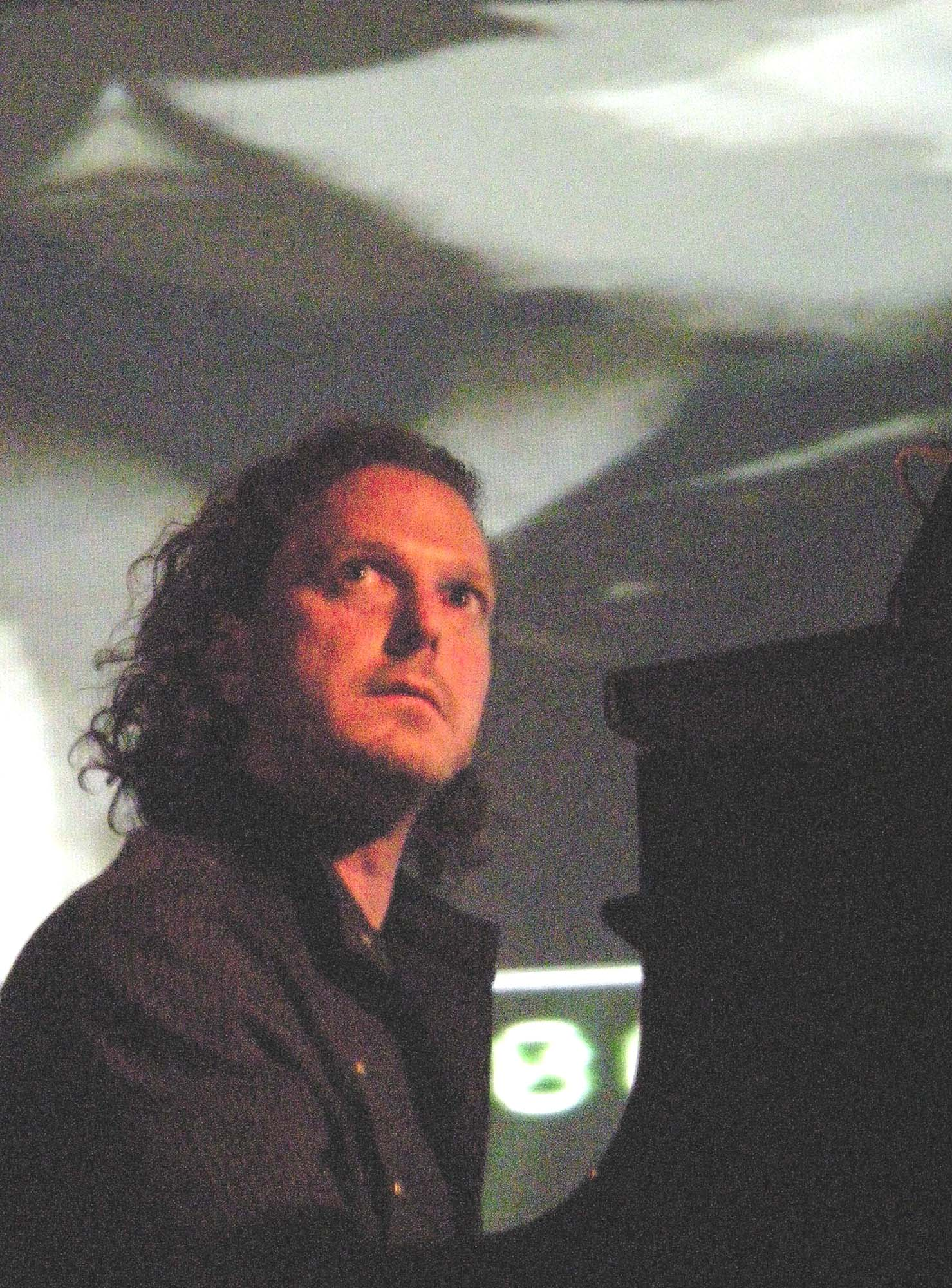
- Huber at Tosca's "No Hassle's" performance, Vienna, Austria, 2009.

Background information
- Born: 1967 (age 58–59); Mödling, Austria
- Genres: Electronica, downtempo, trip hop
- Years active: 1994–present

Rupert W.M. Huber (born 1967 in Mödling, Austria) is an Austrian composer and musician.

In 1994, Huber founded Huber Musik to publish his own music, and in the same year, founded Tosca with Richard Dorfmeister. Huber's 2006 release of Fuck Dub Remixes CD was also created in collaboration with Dorfmeister.

Huber's works have been commissioned, amongst others, by Centre Pompidou, Wiener Festwochen, and Ars Electronica. He lives in Vienna and Berlin.

In 2005, Huber collaborated with violinist Mia Zabelka on Happy Birthday Ars Sonora, a live 5.1 surround-sound radio performance produced by ORF Kunstradio for the twentieth anniversary of the Spanish radio programme Ars Sonora.
