= Trüby Trio =

- Origin: Germany
- Genres: Nu jazz, broken beat
- Years active: 1997-present
- Labels: Studio !K7, Compost Records
- Members: Rainer Trüby; Christian Prommer; Roland Appel

Trüby Trio are a German music group specialising in nu jazz and broken beat. Founded in 1997 by Rainer Trüby, Roland Appel and Christian Prommer, their Latin-influenced sound, integrating bossa nova and flamenco styles, saw the band become pioneers of the nu jazz sound. Their early remixes of artists such as Nitin Sawhney led to the band's own releases on the Compost Records label, with their own work being subject to remixes by artists including Tiefschwarz, Louie Vega and Señor Coconut. The band were asked to compile the DJ-Kicks: Trüby Trio album in 2001, and their debut studio album, Elevator Music, followed in 2003.

== Discography ==
=== Albums ===
- DJ-Kicks: Trüby Trio (Studio !K7, 2001)
- Elevator Music (Compost Records, 2003)
- Retreated (Compost Records, 2004)
