= !K7 Music =

German independent record label

- Parent company: Create Music Group
- Founded: 1984
- Founder: Reiner Bumke; Stephan Guntli; Michael F. Huse; Horst Weidenmüller
- Genre: Electronic
- Country of origin: Germany
- Location: Berlin
- Official website: www.k7.com

!K7 Music is a music company based in Berlin, Germany that focuses mostly on electronic music. The name is an abbreviation of the company's original Berlin address, Kaiserdamm 7 (it has since relocated, first to Heidestrasse 52, and currently headquartered at Gerichtstrasse 35). !K7 has since opened branch offices in New York City and London. It has five independent imprints as part of the K7 Label Group: !K7 Records, 7K!, Strut, Soul Bank and Eternal Source Of Light. K7 also runs successful Label Services and Synch and Licensing departments.

K7 had a licensing deal with the New York–based indie label Frenchkiss Records. It has distributed the labels AGOGO, District 6, Environ, Get Physical, Ghostly International, Lo Recordings, Moshi Moshi Records, Piranha, R2, Skint, Salt Records and Muthas of Invention. It also has a music publishing company. It currently distributes Turbo Recordings, Sonar Kollektiv, Luaka Bop, and Rushhour, among others. The company was acquired by Create Music Group in April 2025.

== History ==
Studio !K7 has produced electronic music artists, especially for the DJ-Kicks compilations. It began in 1985 with the idea of releasing digital video clips. In 1991, the first of the 3LUX series (three volumes) was released, followed by the X-Mix series (from 1993 to 1998). In 1995, the DJ-Kicks series was released. At that time it was unconventional to play complete albums with DJ cuts on home stereos. Artists such as Kruder & Dorfmeister, Nightmares On Wax, Thievery Corporation and Stereo MC's Chromeo, Booka Shade contributed to its release. The compilation series has since included mixes from Jackmaster, Seth Troxler, Marcel Dettmann, Michael Mayer, DJ Koze, Nina Kraviz, Daniel Avery and John Talabot.

In 1996, !K7 started launching artist albums. As of 2014 the !K7 discography features albums from artists such as Kruder & Dorfmeister, Matthew Herbert, Dani Siciliano, Ursula Rucker, Swayzak, and Boozoo Bajou. In 2001, Rapster Records, a new subsidiary of !K7, started focusing on urban, soul and hip-hop music. Since then, Rapster has released records by DJ Jazzy Jeff, Pete Rock, and Roy Ayers, among others. Rapster also forged an alliance with UK-based soul aficionado Peter Adarkwah, head of BBE Records. !K7 founded another subsidiary, Ever Records, in 2006, for indie bands and singer-songwriters such as Cortney Tidwell, Cyann & Ben, and Howie Beck. In 2008 Strut Records & Gold Dust Media joined the !K7 label group. Between 1999 and 2003 Strut released Nigerian Afrobeats, Leftfield Discos, Rare Groove and Grandmaster Flash's latest album. Strut's founder, Quinton Scott, is responsible for A&R. In 2013 !K7 started a cooperation with Tricky for releases on his label, including his 2013 album False Idols.

In May 2017, !K7 created a subsidiary focused on contemporary music, producing artists such as Niklas Paschburg, Hior Chronik, Echo Collective, Henrik Schwarz, Luca D'Alberto, Maike Zazie and Martyn Heyne.

In October 2017, !K7 acquired the catalogues of Patrice Rushen, Miriam Makeba and The Beginning of the End from Warner Music Group, as part of the major's divestments after acquiring Parlophone as a result of the sale and break-up of EMI.

Create Music Group acquired the company in April 2025.

== Artists ==
- John Acquaviva
- The Beginning of the End
- Mykki Blanco
- Bomb The Bass
- Boozoo Bajou
- Brandt Brauer Frick
- da damn phreak noize phunk
- Erol Alkan
- Digitalism
- Chris de Luca
- Sean Deason
- Benjamin Diamond
- Vikter Duplaix
- Eddington Again
- Michael Fakesch
- Fehlfarben
- Five Deez
- Funkstörung
- A Guy Called Gerald
- The Herbaliser
- Herbert
- Beth Hirsch
- Nick Holder
- Interstellar
- K-Hand
- Koop
- Kruder & Dorfmeister
- Mike Ladd
- Ladytron
- Miriam Makeba
- Milosh
- Nicolette
- Out Hud
- Erlend Øye
- Terrence Parker
- Peace Orchestra
- Playgroup
- Princess Superstar
- Stacey Pullen
- Quiet Village
- Rae & Christian
- Ursula Rucker
- Patrice Rushen
- Henrik Schwarz
- Ian Simmonds
- Shantel
- Dani Siciliano
- Smith & Mighty
- Spacek
- Stateless
- Stereotyp
- Swayzak
- Terranova
- Tosca
- Tricky
- Trüby Trio
- Gez Varley
- Goose
- Voom:Voom
- Wamdue Kids
- When Saints Go Machine
- Bjarki
- Red Axes
- Bochum Welt
- Hundred Waters
- Michael Mayer
- Modeselektor

== See also ==
- List of record labels
- List of electronic music record labels
